= History of Francavilla Fontana =

History of the municipality of Francavilla Fontana, Italy

The history of Francavilla Fontana, a town in the Province of Brindisi, begins with the appearance in the Neolithic period of a village inhabited mainly by shepherds. Later, with the settlement first of the Messapians and later of the Romans, a medium-sized center arose. The present town of Francavilla was officially founded in 1310 by Philip I of Anjou, prince of Taranto, after the discovery of a Byzantine icon depicting a Madonna and Child. Due to the extensive concessions granted by Philip, the village developed rapidly, was surrounded by walls, towers and, in the 15th century, was also provided with a castle. From the second half of the 16th century to the middle of the 18th Francavilla was ruled by the Imperiali, considered the best feudal lords the fiefdom had: thanks to their patronage, nobles and artists arrived who, in keeping with the times, gave the town a Baroque appearance.

== Origins ==
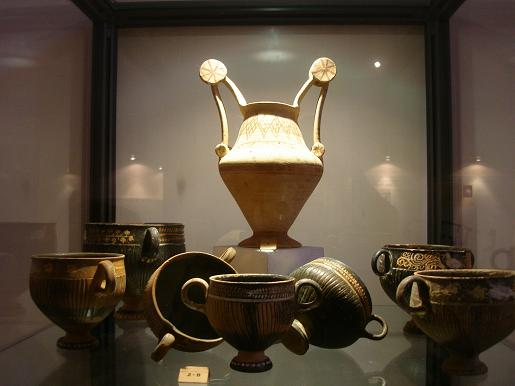
Messapian pottery in the Messapian Documentation Center in Oria

Archaeological excavations carried out in 1950 on an embankment of the Canale Reale, about two kilometers from the town, demonstrated the existence of a Neolithic village, not older than 3000 B.C., inhabited by Mediterranean Siculian people before the invasion of the Ausones. In all likelihood the village must have been at the center of an impressive defensive system formed by rows of stones and megaliths. Excavations have shown that this village had a high degree of social life and an even higher degree of technical and industrial activity. Moreover, given the rarity of knives, arrowheads and agricultural implements uncovered, it was assumed that life must have passed fairly quietly and that the economy was based mainly on pastoralism.

Caves dedicated to worship were also discovered in other areas of the town, in which fragments of vessels from the same period as the village were found, which are now kept in Ostuni at the Museum of Preclassic Civilizations of the Southern Murgia.

Other discoveries in various parts of the city are attributed to the Messapians, who came from Illyria between the 8th and 7th centuries B.C.; in 1978, for example, fourteen tombs, fifteen pits, six wells and remains of dwellings, trozzelle and Egnatia-style vases were discovered in the San Lorenzo district. Of the Messapians themselves are the remains of the territory's impressive defensive system: the specchie.

Of the Roman age, on the other hand, remain basalt paving stones of the Appian Way and a rustic villa discovered in Contrada San Lorenzo, along the banks of the Canale Reale, having an area of about 290 square meters and datable between the first century B.C. and the middle of the second century A.D. The lack of plasterwork, mosaic floors and other finishing touches led to the assumption that the villa in question had not been used as a dwelling, but, indeed, as a rustic villa, forming the epicenter of a fundus. From the numerous archaeological finds from the Roman and Messapic periods, it has been assumed that a large city, razed to the ground in 845 by the Saracens, stretched near the Santa Cecilia and Guardiola districts in ancient times.

=== Hypotheses about the pre-Roman foundation ===
As early as the 16th century, some historians (including, later, Cosimo De Giorgi) asserted that the Messapian and Roman remains found around the present town belonged to ancient Thyrea, a city that belonged first to the Lucanians, then to the Tarantines, destroyed by the Carthaginians, rebuilt and finally destroyed for good during the barbarian invasions of the 6th century. Also according to many local historians, this ancient city would have been as important as Taranto and Oria. Other scholars (including also Francesco Ribezzo) believe or have argued instead that the archaeological remains found in the various districts around Francavilla belong to Rudiae, a city of Greek origin that later became a Roman colony and the home of Quintus Ennius. The area of archaeological research extends from the Masseria dell'Aglio to a few hundred meters from the city of Oria. As early as the 17th century, in fact, it is stated that statues, vases and burials were discovered in the area in question and that, in particular, a marble plaque was discovered bearing the inscription "RUDIAE MINERVAE DICAT..." which was later given to the bishop of Oria Alessandro Maria Kalefati and is still preserved by some of his descendants. Also corroborating the thesis of the existence of a Rudiae in the Francavilla territory are the toponyms of two districts that already existed in the seventeenth century: Rodia grande and Rodia piccola.

== Middle Ages ==
Arms of Philip of Anjou, prince of Taranto. Philip's arms are those of his father Charles II of Anjou debruised with a band of silver.

The year of destruction of Rudiae or another populated center that stood near the present city is difficult to date: it thus ranges from 230 B.C. until 845 (by the Saracens). The surviving people took refuge in a scattered manner throughout the Ager Uritanus (Oritanian Forest), a territory that extended north to the city of Martina Franca, south to the gates of Lecce and is characterized by the presence of forests, abundant fauna, springs, hills and caves.

=== The hamlets ===
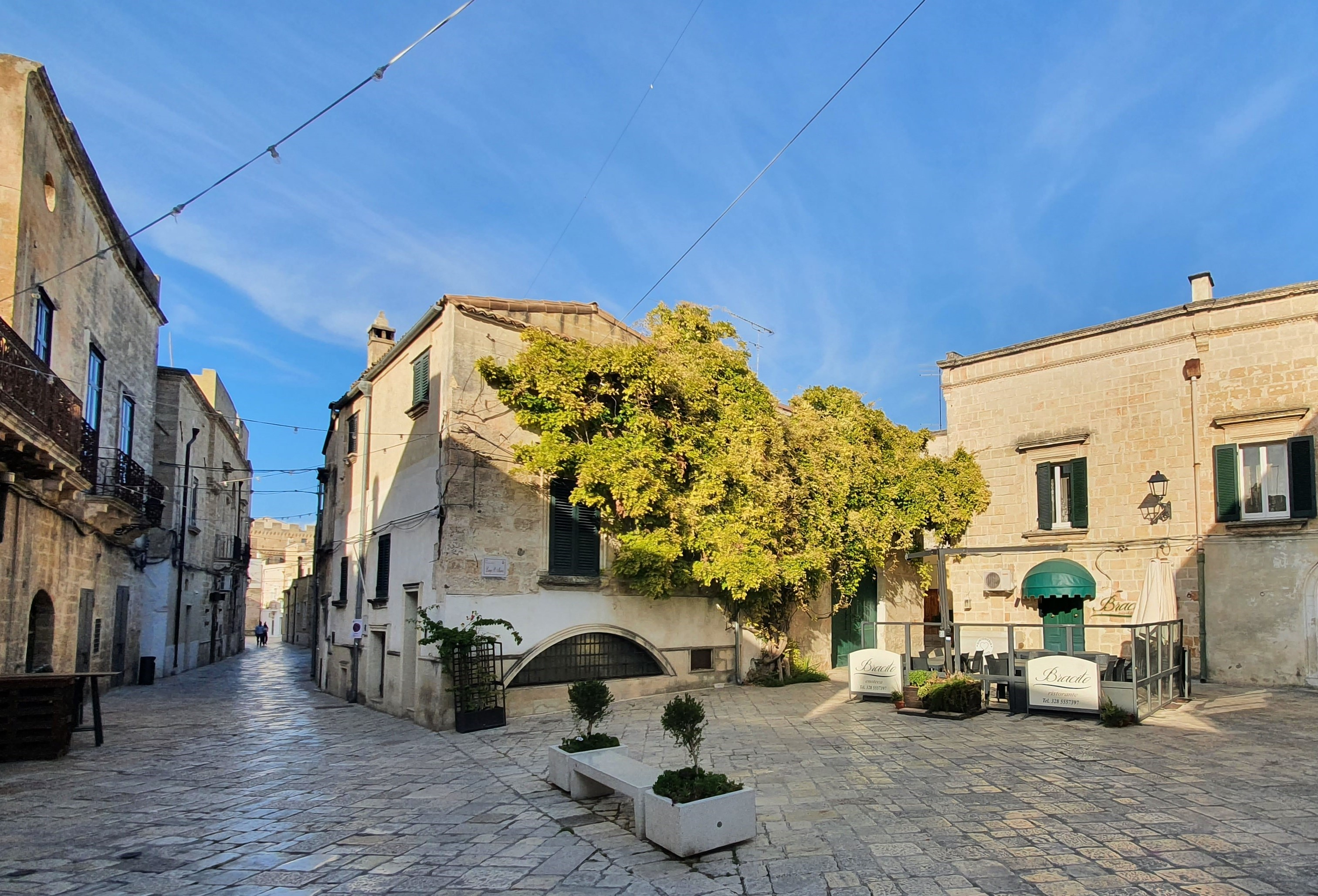
Glimpse of Via San Giovanni and Largo San Marco, places around which the hamlet developed

Within the Oritanian forest, numerous hamlets were created (or in some cases enlarged) near the present town. Among the most important are San Giovanni Gerosolimitano, Pazzano, Caselle, Casalvetere, Casalino and Villa di San Salvatore (believed to be the first nucleus of Francavilla).

Probably, in 866, some Franks who had descended as far as Bari and Oria with Emperor Louis II settled in one of the villages inhabited by the surviving citizens of the destroyed Messapian city, and formed the first nucleus of the town, which in 1155 later became a fief of the Norman baron Goffredo, who, for the occasion, was given the appellation "da Francavilla." However, from various documents, it is believed that in reality Goffredo was a feudal lord of a hamlet of the same name located in the lower Salento region. The hamlet that would later form Francavilla, despite being a military garrison, during those years, was open to trade and never closed by walls.

From the ninth century onward a process of fusion between the hamlets began, to form a single center of medium size. There were several causes for the decline of the hamlets: insecurity, a widespread feeling among the population, and the beginning of fighting between the Normans and Byzantines.

As early as 1200 Francavilla, or the hamlet that would later be thus called, was a fief of Walter III of Brienne; later, in 1291, Pietro de Noha took possession of it, who between 1304 and 1305 left it in the hands of Guglielmo de Noha.

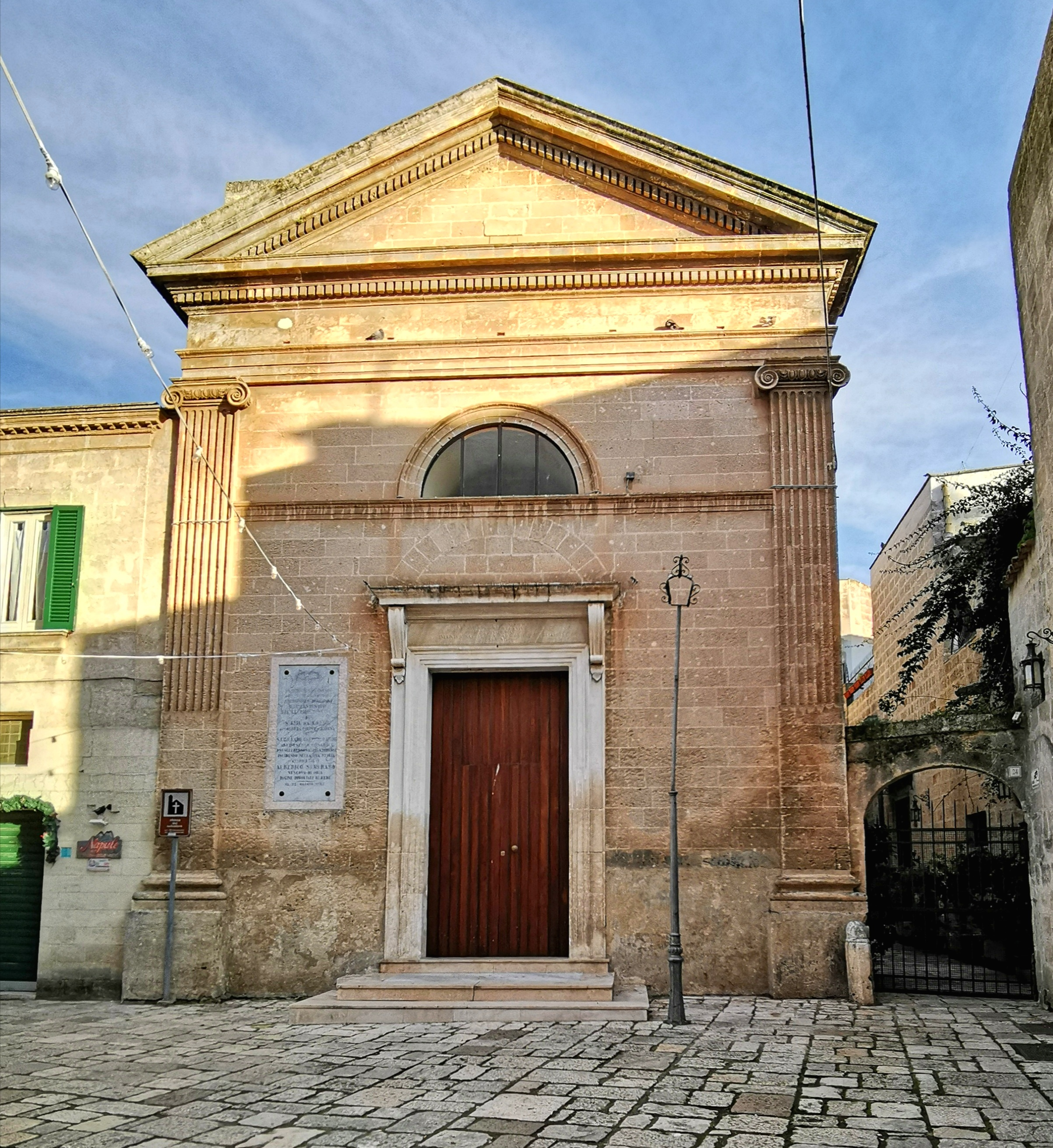
View of the church of San Salvatore

==== Villa del Salvatore ====
The Hamlet of San Salvatore (also called Villa del Salvatore) is believed by many to be the original nucleus of the present-day town of Francavilla. Most likely founded by Greeks, it possessed a temple dedicated to the Goddess Flora (the present Church of the Savior, from which the hamlet took its name). A very ancient legend, though lacking historical basis, says that from this hamlet St. Peter passed on his way to Rome. The fact may be probable, because, following the Brindisi-Taranto and Otranto-Taranto routes (it is not known in which of the two Adriatic cities the saint landed) he passed through Oria and the hamlet of San Salvatore. Also according to legend, after preaching Christian principles, the people converted to Christianity, tore down the old temple, and built a church dedicated to San Salvatore on its foundations.

Many years after the event, a convent was built a short distance from the hamlet, which remained standing until the 14th century.

=== From the Angevin foundation to the Antoglietta ===
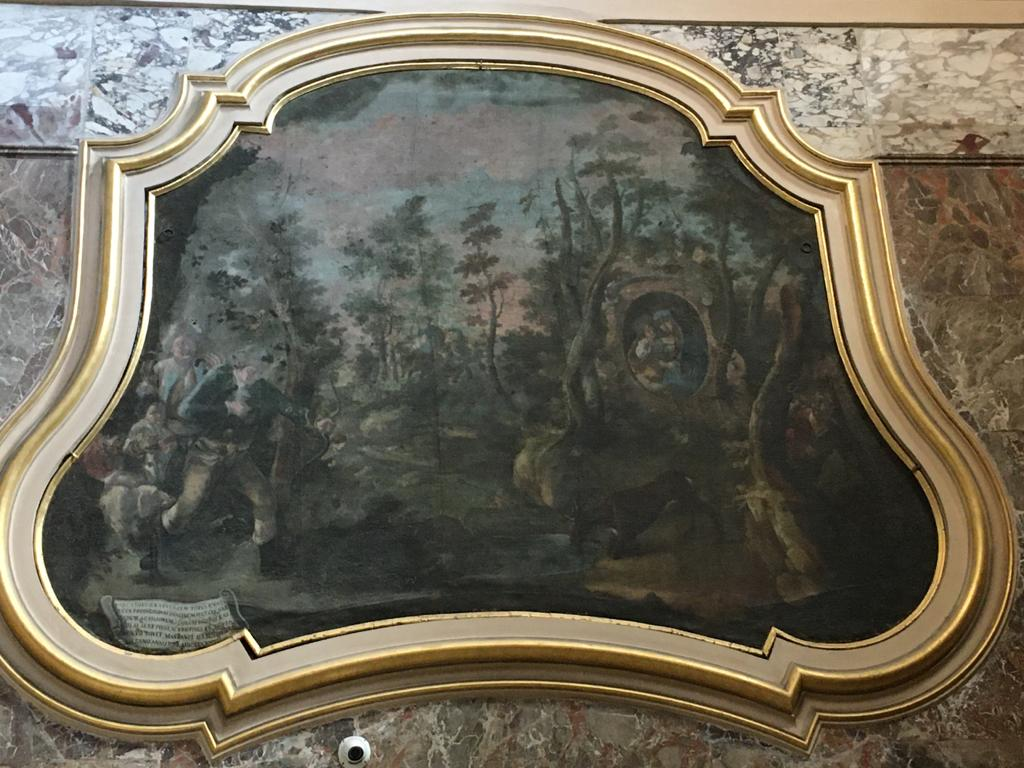
Painting by Domenico Antonio Carella depicting the discovery of the icon located on the altar of the Madonna in the Matrix Church

According to tradition, on the morning of September 14, 1310, Prince Philip I of Taranto decided to go on a hunting trip, together with some nobles, in the part of the forest included just north of Hamlet of Salvatore. Elia Marrese caught a glimpse of a deer in the bush and decided to follow it, looking for the best spot to kill it; when the deer stopped to water at a spring, Marrese shot an arrow at it. However, the dart, instead of hitting the deer, came back toward the nobleman. Stunned by what had happened, he blew his horn to get Philip of Anjou and the other men to rush over and show what had happened. The prince of Taranto decided to clear the thicket to find the cause of that miracle, and soon after a ruined wall (according to others, a Basilian cave) was discovered where a Byzantine icon depicting the Madonna and Child was resting.

The prince of Taranto ordered that a church be built on that site, and in a short time visitors increased dramatically, depopulating the surrounding hamlets and overcrowding the Hamlet of Salvatore. Shortly afterwards Philip of Anjou issued an edict, written on parchment with gold letters (kept until 1623, then disappeared) saying that those who came to live in the Hamlet of Salvatore would have free land, asylum and broad allowances.

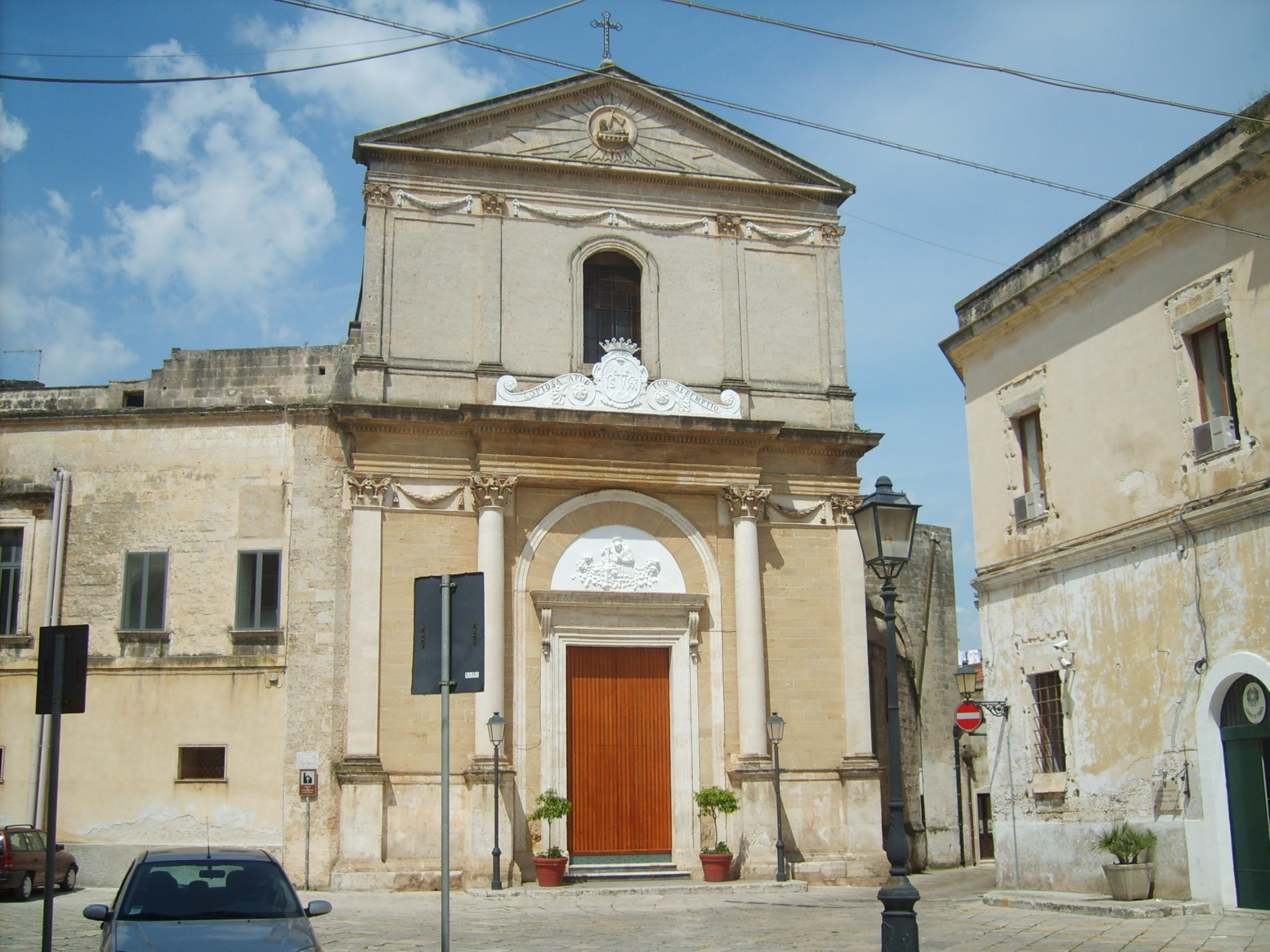
Church of the Liguorini Fathers, located on the site of the medieval church commissioned by Philip

In 1322 Philip I granted the construction of a Franciscan convent "to decorate the new land," built on the site of the present Church of the Liguorini Fathers. On August 28 of the same year, Pope John XXII, by bull, granted plenary indulgence to all those who visited the Byzantine icon every September 14, allowed the sacred image to be transported to the church built by Philip of Anjou, granted the new church to assume all the functions of a parish, and ordered that all the churches in the neighboring hamlets should depend on it.

The first master of the new hamlet was Giacomo Noha, although it is not known whether he really had the rights to the hamlets he owned. Between 1322 and 1335 the hamlet changed its name to Villa Franca (which later changed to Franca Villa). On May 5, 1336 the donation of Francavilla was confirmed to Data d'Adimari and his son Guglielmo. Later, in 1364 Philip II granted the Antoglietta family, the new feudal lords of the town, the construction of the walls. Once the walls were built, the hamlet assumed the title of Terra. During their reign, the Antogliettas increased taxation by introducing a tax to be charged even to priests, being hated by the people for that reason. In 1336, moreover, the hamlet was declared a Royal City.

=== Miracle of the greening of olive trees ===
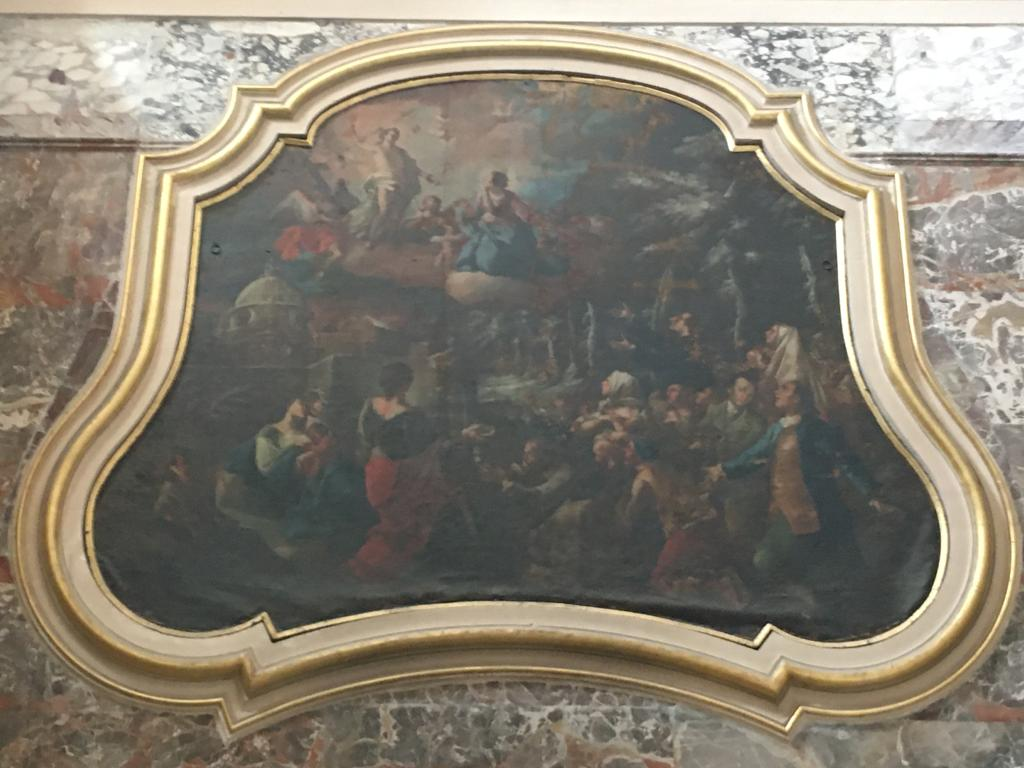
Miracle of the olive trees depicted in a painting by Domenico Antonio Carella, located on the altar of Our Lady in the Matrix Church

The miracle of the greening of the olive trees is dated in the 15th century, but whether in 1420 or 1458 is not known more precisely, depending on the sources. At that time Francavilla's economy was almost exclusively agricultural, and in that year there was a rather harsh winter for crops. The snowfall on January 23 deeply ruined the olive trees, thus causing the citizens to despair, who had no choice but to gather in the mother church and celebrate a solemn mass to ask Our Lady of the Fountain for help. The next morning the peasants noticed that the snow had melted and the olive trees miraculously greened up. The joy was such that it was decided to solemnize the event by instituting a proper festival, still celebrated today on January 24. With the miracle event, the Virgin of the Fountain was also named special patroness of the diocese of Oria.

=== The Orsini government and the promulgation of the Chapters ===
In 1447 one of the first censuses of the families in the Kingdom was carried out; in Francavilla there were 500 of them.

In 1455 Giacomo dell'Antoglietta ceded the hamlet to Giovanni Antonio del Balzo Orsini in exchange for some possessions. The new owner had numerous interests in Francavilla because it was a strategic point between Taranto and Brindisi. He therefore enlarged and reinforced the Angevin walls and built in the northwest corner of the hamlet a fortified square tower surrounded by a moat. To the taxes already in place, he added the tax for the maintenance of a Justicer (four ounces), the tax for a tavern for the Court (four ounces) and the salt tax (two tarì per roll).

As the city grew, the inhabitants of the "Land of Francavilla" wished to be totally independent from Oria, which was in the process of decay at this time. When the town was still a hamlet, since it could not constitute an independent fief, it was coupled with the city of Oria, with the obligation to contribute to the payment of Oritanian collections. The issue led to clashes and killings between the different factions, and on August 24, 1464, the university and men of Francavilla appealed directly to the king, asking to be dispensed from the payment of Oria's collections. The king ordered an end to the fighting (under penalty of a fine of 1,000 ducats), and referred the matter to the Sacred Royal Council. After seven months King Ferrante confirmed the split from Oria, and on November 26, 1464, the Chapters and Graces of Francavilla were remitted, documents written in the vernacular and common Latin, also later confirmed by King Alfonso and the Prince of Taranto.

The documents established that Francavilla was to be bound only to the Principality of Taranto, that princely taxes, the stallio, the maintenance of the Justicer and the double tax on salt were abolished; the Land was never again to be a possession of the Antoglietta, all crimes were to be pardoned, taxes were to be suspended, the feast of San Salvatore was to be held every August 26, if crimes were also committed outside the Land the citizens were to be tried in Francavilla, the citizens themselves could have three days to defend themselves against the charges and could only be reported to civil and criminal officials, no Justicer could rule in the Land, and those who had to pay huge taxes could not be "dispossessed" altogether (they would be able to go directly to the prince of Taranto to take back their belongings). The Chapters were validated on December 29, 1469 in Taranto Castle by the king and Antonello Petrucci, who was later tried for the Conspiracy of the Barons.

On Oct. 20, 1485, King Frederick of Aragon stayed in the castle of Francavilla with the soldiers after the expulsion of the Turks from Otranto.

Chronicles from the last years of the fifteenth century recount that a battle took place in the Grani district between the French and the Aragonese, who were at that time contending in southern Italy.

== Modern Age ==
=== The Bonifacios and the issue of taxes ===
On September 7, 1500, Frederick of Aragon himself granted possession of the marquisate of Oria to Roberto Bonifacio, who added with his subsequent purchase in 1517 Francavilla and Casalnuovo (Manduria).

On March 16, 1517, the graces for the university were signed in Naples, containing for the most part measures of a rural nature and others already granted by Ferdinand I and, among others, one that granted the construction of a new village outside the Land, since the population had increased considerably in recent years. The same year the Land saw the arrival of the Carmelites, who built a convent.

In 1520 Giovanni Bernardino Bonifacio, son of Roberto, bought Francavilla (along with Casalnuovo), reconfirmed its privileges and annulled all the trials.

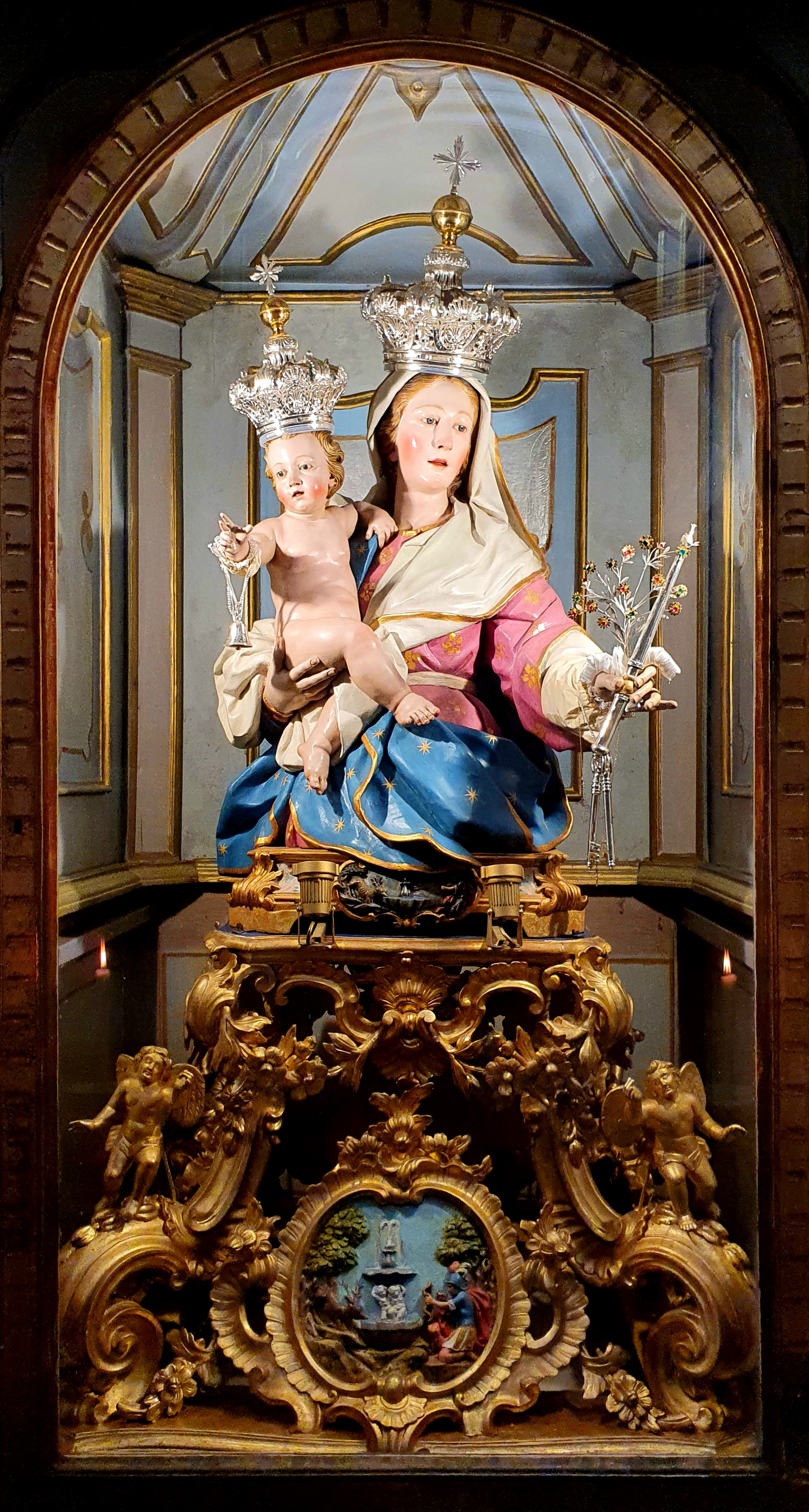
Wooden simulacrum of Our Lady of the Fountain with Child, patroness of the City

In the same year, a miracle happened that greatly increased devotion to Our Lady of the Fountain: at the end of winter, the area was enveloped by a wave of great cold; on January 23, it snowed so intensely that the snow broke almost all the olive trees. As a result, the entire population, in despair, rushed to the church to ask Our Lady for help. By Jan. 24, when mass was over, the snow had melted in several places and the olive trees were back intact. For more than a week the festivities in honor of Our Lady went on, and the collegiate church was decorated with numerous flashlights and candles.

A few years later the clergy of Francavilla began to fight to defend their rights against the interference of the bishops of Oria: in 1528 the Francavilla clergy was taxed one thousand scudi for the construction of the seminary in the city of Oria; shortly afterwards the Chapter decided to send the archpriest Claudio Vinciguerra to Rome to denounce this taxation, and Rome, agreeing with the Francavilla Chapter, reduced the tax from one thousand to two hundred scudi.

Later, with the invasion of the French and Venetians, the Cappelletti, mercenaries who plundered every town on their way, also arrived in the Kingdom of Naples. After destroying several Apulian towns, they also arrived near Francavilla in late June 1529, but, fearing an ambush, postponed the siege until the next day; they thus camped in Contrada Grani. Inside the walls, the citizens, having seen the arrival of the Cappelletti, instead of preparing to face them, took refuge in the churches, hoping for a miracle; they even offered the Keys of the Land to the patroness of the city, to have her help in return. At dawn, the Cappelletti noticed that a huge swamp had been formed around their camp, which was impossible to cross: they thus refused to attack the city and took to Mesagne, which had already been severely sacked. In memory of the miraculous event in the same year a chapel was erected, which still exists today.

In 1532, after another census, 723 families were counted in the city.

In 1531 the Oritanian clergy again came under the burden of the Francavillese clergy, so that on October 2, 1531 the people of Francavilla established the Procurator ad lites in Rome, who had the task of defending the cause over the Seminary. In 1532 another procurator was sent to Rome so that the Francavillese chapter would no longer be bothered by the Oritanian chapter for the payment of the Seminary, and Don Francesco Antonio Caniglia, stationed in Rome, was ordered to give a memorial on the facts directly to the Pope. The Oritanian Curia, however, would not relent and in 1534 had the archpriest Vinciguerra arrested and taken to Oria, later released at the insistence of all the clergy, who were obliged to keep, again in Rome, yet another special procurator.

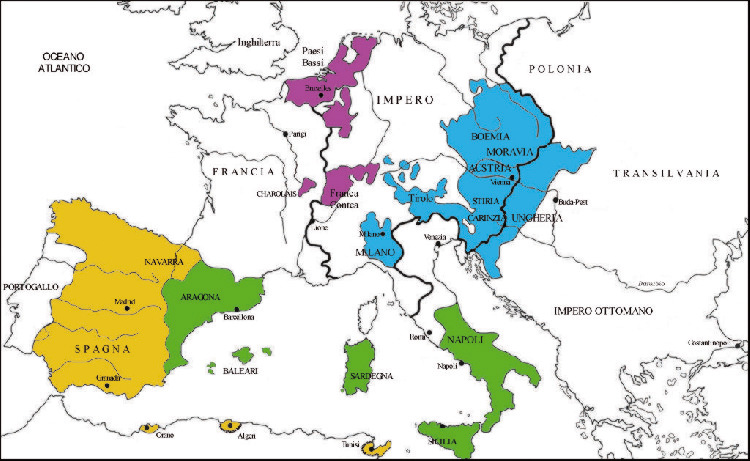
Dominions of Charles V

With the French driven away, for a short time the marquisate of Oria, like many others in the Kingdom of Naples, was ruled by army officers. Shortly thereafter, Roberto Bonifacio bought back the marquisate for twenty-five thousand ducats. On April 5, 1536 Charles V reconfirmed all the privileges to the Land of Francavilla previously signed by King Ferrante, Giovanna IV and Bonifacio, who died in Naples in the same year.

After him, according to some writers, the marquisate was ruled by Dragonetto, his brother, until 1554, the year of his death.

Soon after, Roberto's son, Giovanni Bernardino Bonifacio, then 19 years old, became to all intents and purposes the new governor. After traveling extensively, in 1537, suspected of heresy and then persecuted, he took refuge in Oria, buying back Casalnuovo. On November 25, 1538, he signed the Chapters of Francavilla, most of which contained rural, economic, and public administration reorganization measures and retouches of older measures. In 1546 he moved from Oria to the castle of Francavilla: in these years the castle, which had not undergone substantial changes since 1450, was enlarged and the moat widened.

Meanwhile, the population in the Land increased: in 1545 there were 768 families.

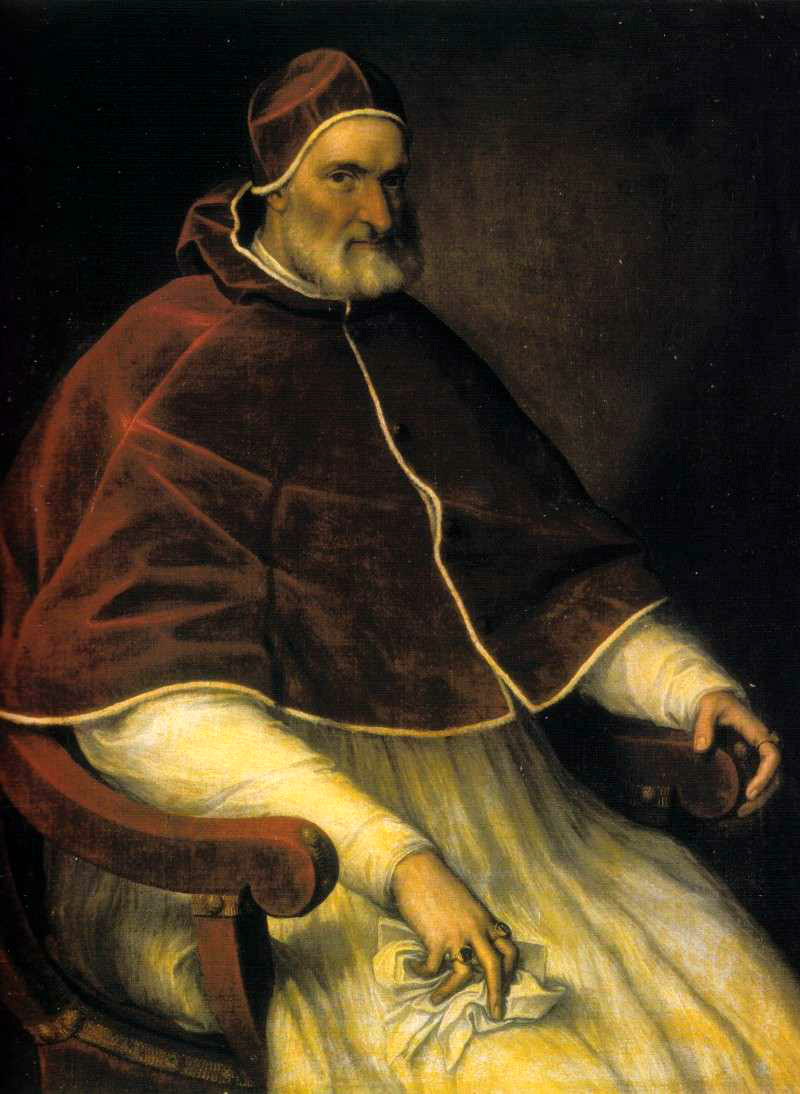
Portrait of Pope Pius IV, who bought the fief of Francavilla in 1560

=== Giacomo Paniscotti and the escape of Bernardino Bonifacio ===
Also during the same period, Giacomo Biancolino Paniscotti, a Capuchin friar who had the reputation of being an excellent preacher against the Reformation, was going around the province. Having heard the story of Giovan Bernardino, he went to the castle of Francavilla to convert him to the ideals of the Catholic Church; after numerous sermons, he failed to convert the marquis, but offended him even more, so much so that Bonifacio was forced to kill him. A few days after the first meeting, the marquis sent someone to tell him that he had converted and wanted him to join him at once at the castle. To the guards guarding the gate of the fortress, meanwhile, Bonifacio ordered them to throw the friar into the moat as soon as they saw him. However, the Capuchin, not suspecting the trap, went to the castle, crossed the bridge over the moat and the guards. He thus came to the marquis and, when he found that he had not been converted at all, began again with the heavy preaching. When he finished, he left the castle and returned unharmed to his quarters. Bonifacio then went to the guards and asked why they had not thrown him into the ditch as ordered; the soldiers replied that they had not seen him arrive or leave.

This fact increased his reputation as a heretic, and since he could no longer stay in the Kingdom, in 1557, having passed from Naples so as not to arouse suspicion, he fled to Venice and then to Germany, leaving the marquisate abandoned.

Bonifacio's predilection of Francavilla was not pleasing to the Oritanians. The ancient question of collections, in those very years, had become heated again because of a measure issued by Giovan Bernardino by which it was said that no Oritanian could become Captain of the Land of Francavilla. The Oritanians' hostility toward the marquis increased even more when he preferred to move to the castle of Francavilla instead of remaining in Oria.

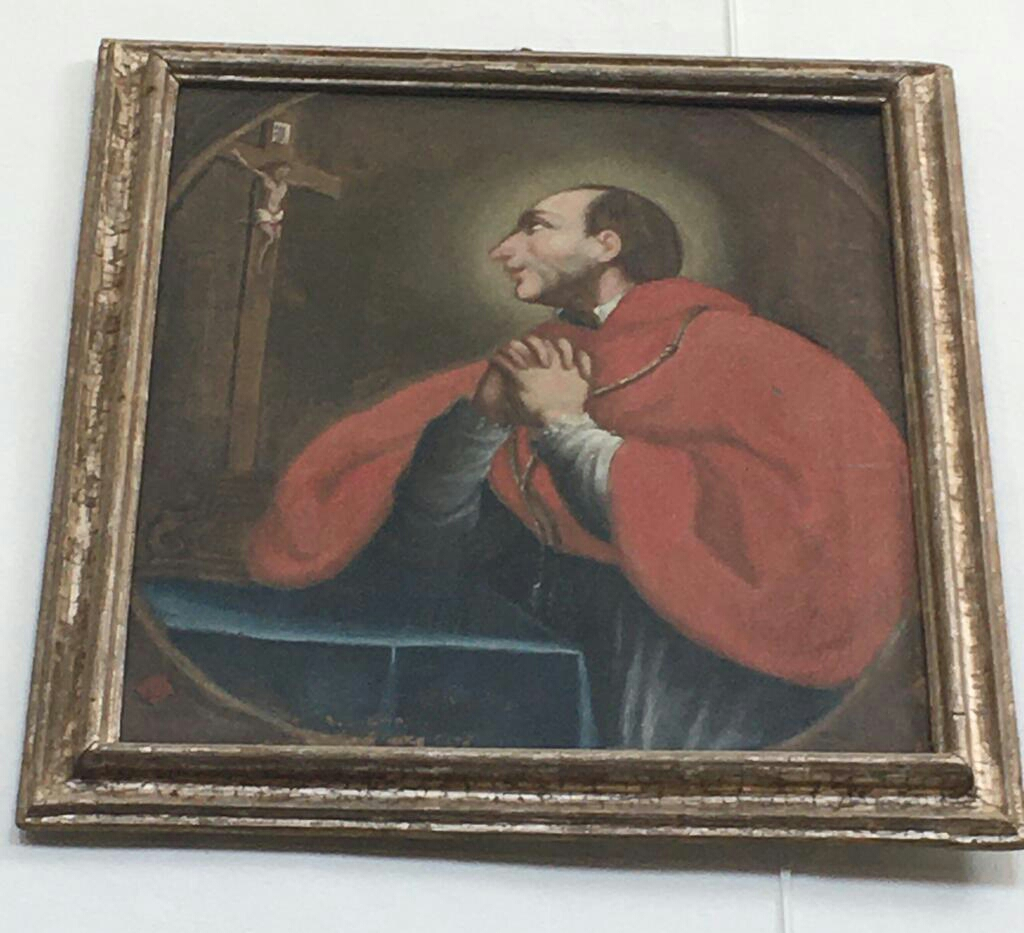
Saint Charles Borromeo, who became lord of the marquisate of Oria for a few years. (Portrait preserved in the Matrix Church)

=== After the Bonifacios ===
On Oct. 12, 1557, the Royal Court took possession of the fief, sending the governor Francesco de Bolea to Oria. On the 29th of the same month, however, the fief was bought by Ferdinando Loffredo, marquis of Trevico and governor of Terra d'Otranto, who sold it in 1558 for 11.250 ducats, to buy the fiefdom of Ostuni. After Loffredo, the fiefdom was devolved to the Royal Court, and bought in 1560 by Pope Pius IV for his nephew Count Federico Borromeo. In 1561 there were 836 families in the town. On Federico's death, the fief was ceded in 1563 to Charles Borromeo (who became St. Charles from 1610); meanwhile, the deputy prince and general governor of the marquisate of Oria was Geronimo Maggiolino, who resided in Francavilla and held the office until 1568. On September 30, 1566, Charles Borromeo signed the renewal of privileges, chapters and graces. Borromeo never came to the fief, nor did he make any major changes in his possessions: during the time he had the marquisate, a seminary was founded and some popular customs were forbidden. He appointed Ortensio Pagano as his advisor and treasurer. In early 1568, Charles Borromeo sold the fiefdom to Giovan Battista Castaneo, Archbishop of Cassano, for forty thousand scudi; writers of the time relate that the cardinal distributed all the proceeds of the sale to the poor of Milan in a single day.

When the rule of the Borromeo family ended, the town in 1569 was sold to Melchiorre de Herrera and later, in 1571, to Filippo Spinola.

In 1582 the Sacred Congregation renewed the reduction of the payment for the construction of the Seminary of Oria from one thousand to two hundred scudi.

During approximately two hundred and fifty years since its founding, the Land had grown almost like a City, with the construction of new districts and the reorganization of the Red Book, in which were contained all the municipal statutes independent of those of Oria, already granted by King Alfonso, enlarged and perfected by successive lords. The population also continued to increase: in 1586 there were 856 families, and in 1595 it rose to 994. However, it is assumed that this number was not exact, since, according to the number of families present in the fief, the taxes increased or decreased: it is therefore thought that in reality the number of families present in the Land of Francavilla was much higher.

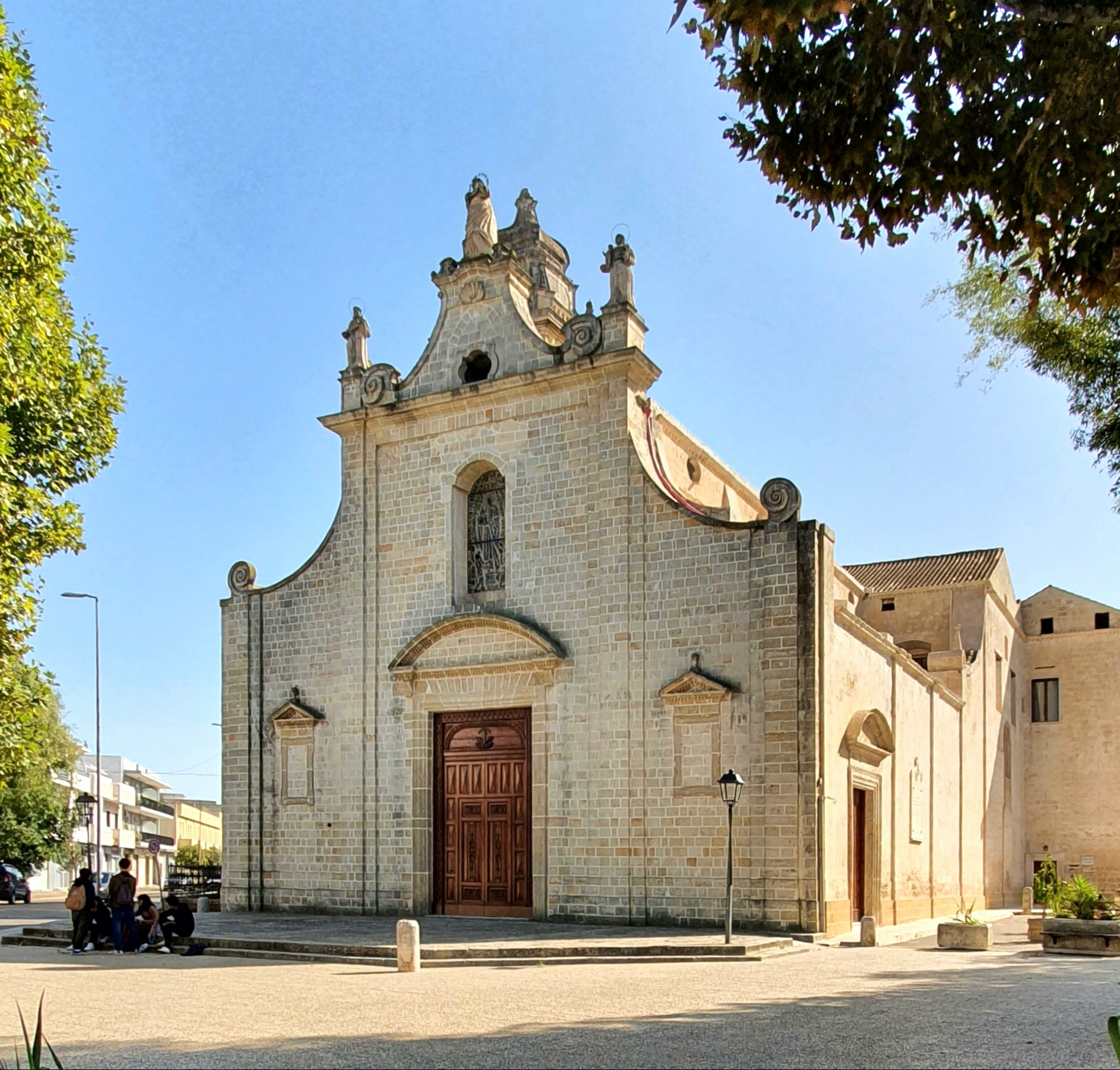
Glimpse of the convent of the Friars Minor Observant

The hamlets were gradually becoming more populous, and the one granted by Giovanna IV grew so large that it was called Lo Burgo. The Land also attracted many families from outside Apulia and the Kingdom of Naples, such as the Argentina family from France, the Bottari family from Genoa, the Benanduci family from Tolentino, the Casalino family from Rovigo, and others. The average level of culture of the inhabitants was quite high. During the span of the sixteenth century, the Matrix Church was enlarged in various stages and, especially after the Council of Trent, new religious orders were established: after the Carmelites, the Capuchins arrived in 1570, well-liked by the population after the clash between Bonifacio and Paniscotti, and also supported by the Borromeos; in 1573 it was the turn of the Friars Minor Observant, also well-liked by the population, and finally, there was the arrival of the Priests of the Oratory, part of the order of St. Philip Neri: in the Land they opened some stores and in some buildings they cared for the dying and founded the first public school in the fief, in which children learned to read.

=== The arrival of the Imperiali ===
A year before the arrival of the Order of St. Philip Neri in the city, in 1572, Davide Imperiale, a member of the Genoese family of the Imperiali and progenitor of the Imperiali branch of Francavilla, bought the fief for 140,000 ducats, to which another 132,000 ducats were later added. Some historians believe that, due to various disagreements that arose after the reading of the sales contract, the Genoese was no longer very keen on buying the marquisate and perhaps did not even sign the contract. From this time began the phase of greatest splendor for the Land of Francavilla; the Imperiali, the best feudal lords the fiefdom had ever had, made numerous improvements in the city and, especially under the last princes Michele Senior and Michele Junior, new districts sprang up, the city walls were enlarged and new gates were opened. In addition, with their patronage, numerous academies of scholars and artists were opened.

Heraldic symbol of the Imperiali

In the same years, the archbishopric of Brindisi and the bishopric of Oria separated: Mesagne, Cellino San Marco, Guagnano, Salice Salentino, Veglie, Leverano, Tuturano, San Donaci and San Pancrazio Salentino went to Brindisi; Manduria, Erchie, Torre Santa Susanna, Ceglie Messapica, Sava and, after a bitter dispute between the two jurisdictions that led to numerous quarrels, Francavilla as well (the inhabitants of the Land were also opposed to entering the Oritanian jurisdiction) went to Oria.

In 1586, at the age of thirty-three, Davide Imperiali died in Genoa, probably poisoned. The marquisate was inherited by his son Michele, who married Maddalena Spinola and resided in Genoa until 1593. He was the first of the Imperiali family to reside in Francavilla, sumptuously furnishing the castle.

=== The return of conflicts between Francavilla and Oria ===
Meanwhile, fueling the rivalries between Francavilla and Oria, in addition to the issue of collections, for a few years the issue of Francavilla properties in the Oritanian territory had been added, whose owners did not want to pay Oria's collections, but those of the city to which they belonged; the fines previously issued by King Alfonso worked only temporarily: the people of Oria showed the University of Francavilla a copy of an arrangement made in 1498 in which it was stipulated that, by drawing a dividing line from the walls of Oria to Francavilla, Oritanian collections were to be paid on the one hand and Francavilla collections on the other. The line of separation was also drawn from Oria to Montecalvo (in Grottaglie territory) and from Oria to Ostuni. This treaty was seriously questioned by the University of Francavilla, which did not understand why it had not come out in the open earlier and why the original was not shown; however, it agreed to go to the partition sites to verify its accuracy and later resorted to the Royal Chamber to denounce the fact that many people from Francavilla, having bought houses and land in Oritanian territory, would have to pay the tax. The Sacred Royal Council ordered that the taxes on the property in question be suspended, but on October 17, 1582, Oria demanded that all persons registered in the city's land register be forced to pay; this demand, however, proved futile, since shortly afterwards it was ordered that the people of Francavilla should pay in Francavilla, while, on November 18, 1597, Royal Councillor Giovanni Demestaneza decreed that the possessors of Francavilla should pay in Oria.

=== From the early seventeenth century to the death of Michele Imperiali ===
The decree was sanctioned on April 7, 1603, but it was not enforced in 1605, 1607, or 1663.

In the early 1600s Francavilla was the only town in Apulia to have two hospitals: the Fatebenefratelli and the Camberlingo.

In 1604 the cadastre was begun, from which it appears that there were 1100 families and 3707 inhabitants, divided mainly into 45 men-at-arms, 87 priests, 60 nobles, 163 foreigners, 353 farmers, 15 carpenters, 10 cartwrights, 9 bailiffs, 16 masons, 6 millers, 8 quarriers, 9 tailors, 12 cloth makers, 11 tanners, 7 haberdashers, 20 haulers, a saddler, a cook, a silk stocking maker, 7 doctors, 3 physicians, and a judge, although, because of the tax issue, the figures were presumably not exact.

From 1613 to 1615 the collegiate church underwent further interventions: in 1613 a chapel was built to house the Byzantine image of the Madonna and Child, which until that time had remained on a wooden altar encircled by iron gates; two years later further extensions were made, thanks in part to Michele Imperiali, who had donated an altar to Our Lady of the Fountain in 1604 and participated at his own expense in the restoration of the church roof. Michele Imperiali died in Galatina on August 17, 1616, and on the same day he was transported and buried temporarily in the collegiate church of Francavilla, and then brought back to Genoa.

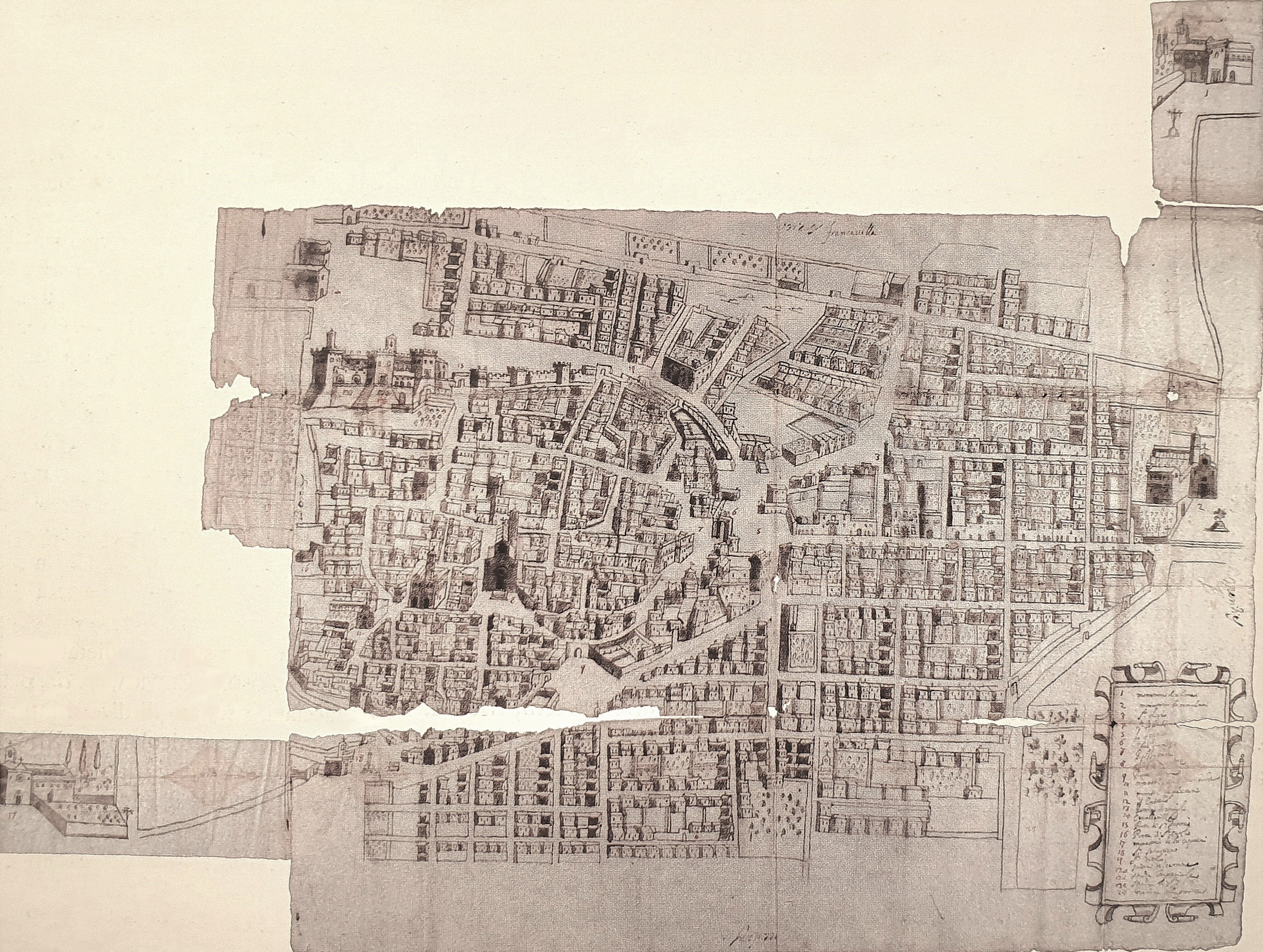
View of Francavilla in 1643. Drawing by C. F. Centonze

=== From Davide to Michele I Imperiali ===
The third marquis was his son Davide Imperiali, who in 1622 married his cousin Veronica Spinola. He too died young, in 1623, as a result of a bitter dispute that broke out in Naples between him and the marquis of Pescara and Vasto. Davide's son Michele was cared for by Maddalena Spinola, who remained in Francavilla until February 1626, and then returned to Genoa. In this way the child was under the care of Marc'Antonio Imperiali, who died in 1628 and was buried in the church of Santa Maria della Croce. In the same year the university settled some debts contracted with the Imperiali Court, also selling some mills near the castle.

In 1627 Monsignor Ridolfo obliged the Francavillese priests to pay one tarì each for the construction of the new prison in Oria; the Francavillese clergy, therefore, was forced in 1630 to send another procurator to Rome to be defended against the injustices of the Oritanian bishops.

On February 9, 1631, Oria's mayor Filippo Papatodero and Francavilla's mayor Orazio Mucciolo came to an agreement on the issue of collections: they stipulated that the University of Francavilla would pay, once only, 460 ducats per tax and 60 ducats per year on the condition that the rights that Oria had over the funds in question should pass to the University itself.

One of Michele Imperiali's uncles on March 6, 1626 presented the Viceroy of Toledo with a plan for the creation, at his own expense, of a Mount of Pious Works, with the aim of helping the poor economically and properly educating children. The plan for the Mount has twenty-seven articles outlining the organizational structure.

With the ever-increasing population, there was a need to finish already developed hamlets and build new ones: therefore, numerous requests were granted for land belonging to convents, the chapter or the university.

In 1643 another memorial was presented to the Pope to inform him about the continuing abuses of the bishop of Oria. Subsequently, in 1644 recourse was again made to the Pope to denounce the edict issued by the bishop of Oria imposing taxation on the clergy of Francavilla of 116 ducats annually for the construction of the seminary (a matter apparently closed in 1582).

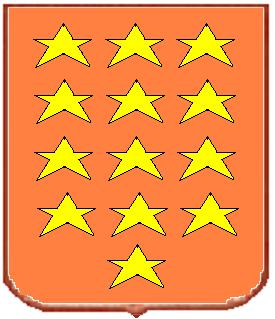
Coat of arms of Salazar

Michele Imperiali, having come of age, was given the title of fourth marquis of Oria and also assumed the title of first prince of Francavilla. In order to worthily develop the level of civilization and commerce in the fiefdom, he called in laborers and masters from many parts of Italy so that they could introduce arts and crafts.

=== The anti-feudal revolutions of 1646-1648 ===
Meanwhile, revolutions against feudal oppression were growing throughout the Kingdom of Naples, which also broke out in many towns in Apulia such as Ostuni, Massafra, Lecce, Nardò and Brindisi. In Francavilla, however, Michelino was able to quell any revolutionary ferment. Having declared the republic in the Kingdom of Naples, in 1648 Francesco Salazar, count of Vaglio, and Matteo Cristiano, leader of the people, descended on the provinces. After being in Matera, Altamura, Gravina and Castellaneta, they headed for Taranto. The nobles, in order to counterattack, chose Francavilla as a parade ground, both because the village was capable of housing the army and because it was strategically located. Within a short time, 700 infantrymen and 300 horses were gathered from Massafra and Ostuni; on February 10, 1648, a council was held in the castle of Francavilla through which it was decided to first recapture Grottaglie and then head for Taranto. Like so many other cities, these also surrendered and around mid-June the persecutions began.

=== Death of Michele II and Ambrogio Imperiali ===
On May 7, 1651, Spain, suspecting that Genoa had supported the French in the whole affair, issued an order to seize all Genoese (i.e., Imperiali's) property in the Terra d'Otranto. Michele Imperiali, with the help of Friar Giovanni Battista Brancaccio, marquis of Rinello, general of artillery and Baglivo da Santo Stefano in Apulia, who had been given orders to go to Otranto to guard the coast against possible landings and who, having arrived in Terra d'Otranto established his headquarters precisely in Francavilla, demonstrated his loyalty to Spain with various proofs, listing all the aid given to the Viceroy during past revolutions. The seizure, therefore, was suspended and forgotten.

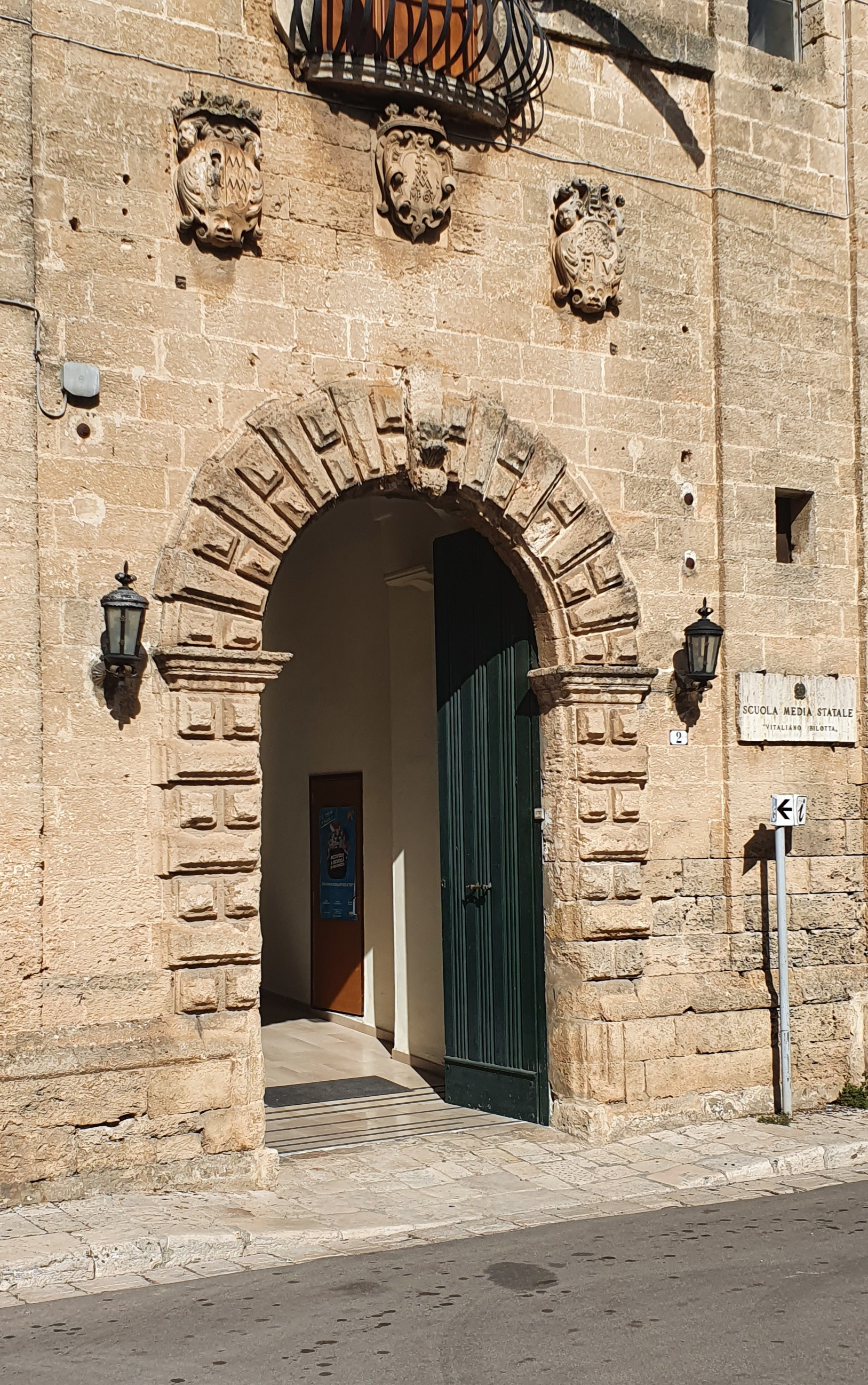
Front door of the former Royal Ferdinandean College

In 1654 Michele married Brigida Grimaldi in Genoa, by whom he had 12 children. On December 6, 1664, at the age of 41, Michele Imperiali died. Succeeding him in the principality was Andrea, one of his sons, who remained in Genoa until 1677, where he married Pellina Grimaldi, sister to the then prince of Monaco. After living a few years in Naples, he went to live in Francavilla; there he poured much of his wealth into charitable works, seeking to provide especially for starving children and their education. Stricken by illness, on November 25, 1678, he dictated his will to the notary: among them, he donated 2,000 ducats for the introduction of the Fathers of the Pious Schools in the city, with the obligation of free education and assistance to the dying. Andrea Imperiali died that same day.

His brother Ambrogio also died on November 26, who behaved in the same way as Andrea: feeling on the verge of death, he called the archpriest Domenico Fanelli and, in the presence of the Capuchin friar Domenico da Francavilla, declared that he was donating five hundred ducats so that he could marry a poor spinster every year; he also added that if a conservatory of virgins or a refuge for "repentant women" was founded in Francavilla, that money should be used for such an institution.

Michele Imperiali, son of Andrea and Pellina, inherited the principality. In 1696, at the age of nineteen, he married Irene Delfina di Simiana, a member of a noble family from Turin.

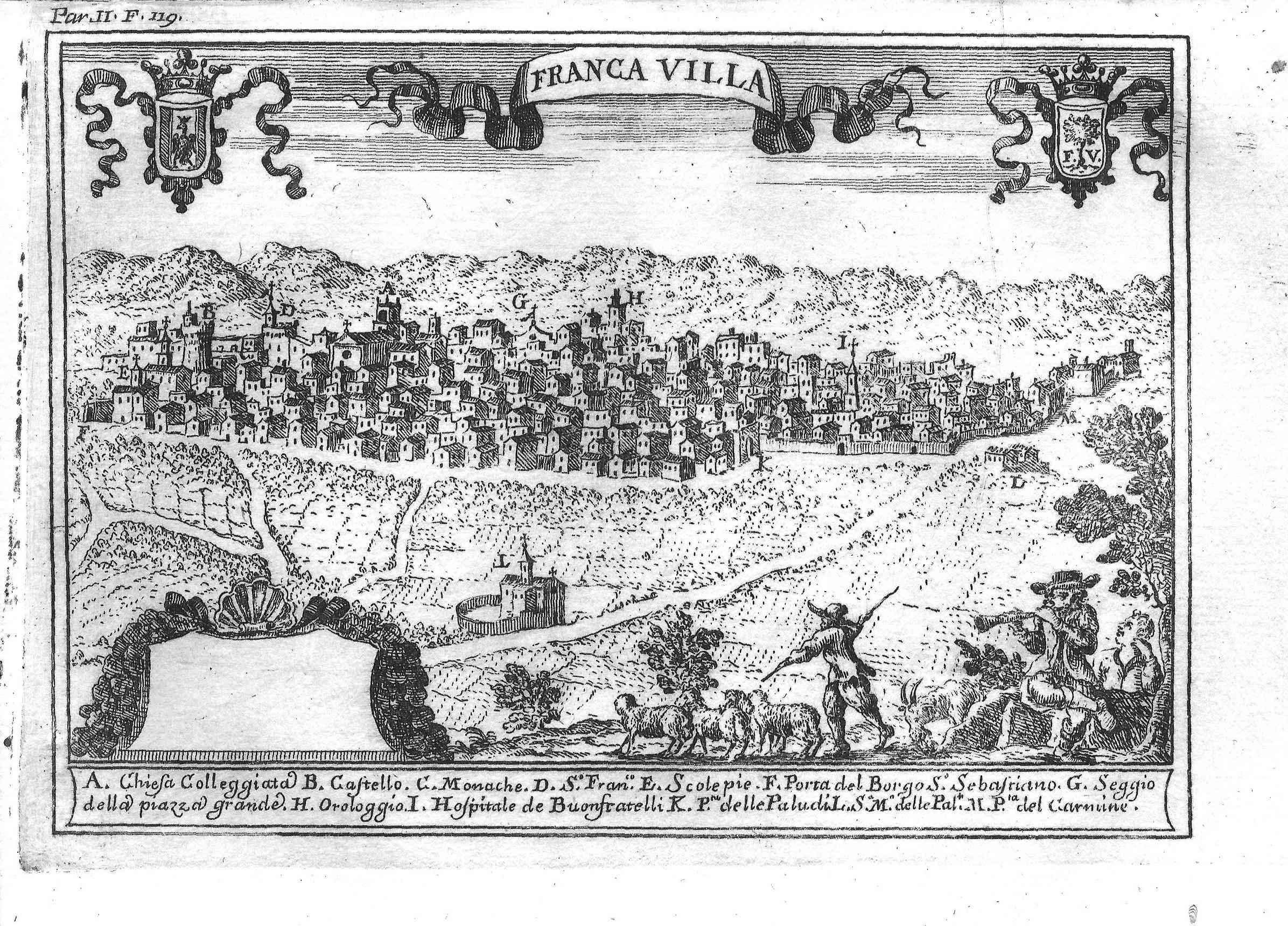
Drawing from "The Kingdom of Naples in Perspective" (1702) by Giovanni Battista Pacichelli

=== From the transformation of the castle to Michele Junior ===
Michele Imperiali, though accused by some Oritanians of stealing 700,000 ducats and salt from the salt pans of Avetrana, imprisoned and politically persecuted, sought to improve his fiefdom: among the largest works he commissioned were the construction of the new feudal palace in Manduria and the transformation, from 1701 to 1730, of the one in Francavilla. Towers were incorporated into the corners of the castle, and dungeons were left in the basement, equipped with some torture instruments used by the prince himself against his enemies. He also built a chapel and, just beyond the moat, a theater. Outside the city he ordered the creation of the garden of delights, full of trees, plants, ponds and some horses. He was a lover of art, letters and antiquities: he had many artists and men of letters gathered in the castle and arranged a large library in one room, also collecting the books that Cardinal Giuseppe Renato Imperiali had donated to the city. The walls were adorned with paintings of fine workmanship. Also being a patron, Imperiali offered favors and protection to the most renowned masters.

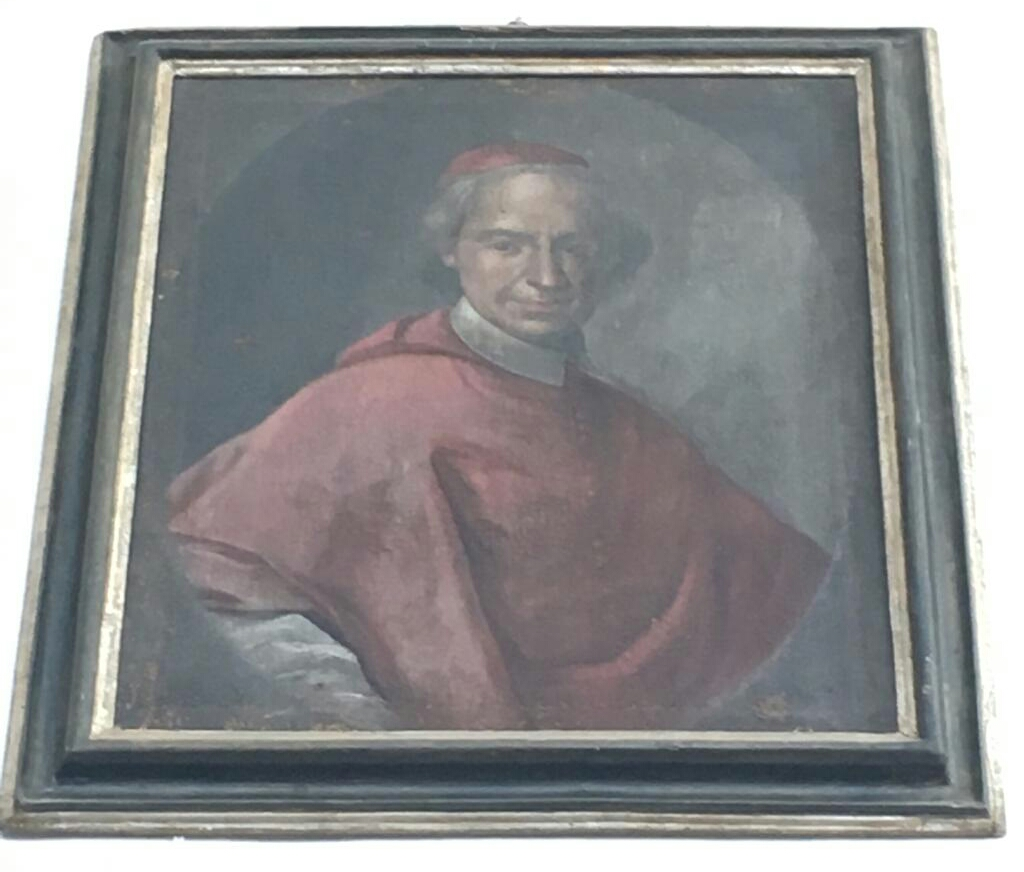
Portrait of Giuseppe Renato Imperiali kept in the Matrix Church

The prince died on June 23, 1738. A year later, according to his wishes, he was transported to Francavilla; the funeral was long and lavish, at the end of which he was laid to rest in the then Franciscan church.

In the same month his young nephew Michele Imperiali, his father Andrea, son of Michele III, having already died, assumed by succession the titles of his predecessor of the same name. In November Michele IV went to Francavilla, where he stayed for several months; in 1739 he went to Naples where, in 1740, he married Eleonora Borghese; later he moved to Turin and finally returned to Francavilla. Upon his return, as his first act of government, he decreased all impositions by a third. He also made significant improvements to the Land: in 1739 he had the castle completely insulated and demolished arches and columns that supported an arbor over the entrance gate; in 1740 he flattened the trees of the Amendolito to create a forest; in 1742 he improved the Peschiera and the square.

=== The earthquake of 1743 ===
On February 20, 1743, at night, an earthquake of the ninth degree of the Mercalli scale struck the city hard, destroying it in part and causing 11 casualties. The same night Princess Eleonora Borghese together with her ladies rendered first aid to the population. With the light of day, the chronicles described a bleak spectacle: almost all the churches had partially collapsed, many houses were totally destroyed; people did not work until 11 March. During those days Mayor Giuseppe Lupoli opened the warehouses that contained the food reserves and offered much of his money. A few weeks later, the entire population began the reconstruction of the city; the Imperiali offered almost half of their assets to help the reconstruction work, and the officers of the university gave up their salaries. In many cases it was preferred to tear down what remained of the building and rebuild following the style of the time as well: this was done for almost all of the city's churches. On August 15, 1743, the foundation stone of the new mother church was laid by Michele Imperiali and his wife, which, having suffered great damage, was torn down and rebuilt. As a symbolic gesture, the brick was pierced in its center, into which was then inserted a lead box containing a coin of Benedict XII, a medal of Our Lady of the Fountain and a jar of oil.

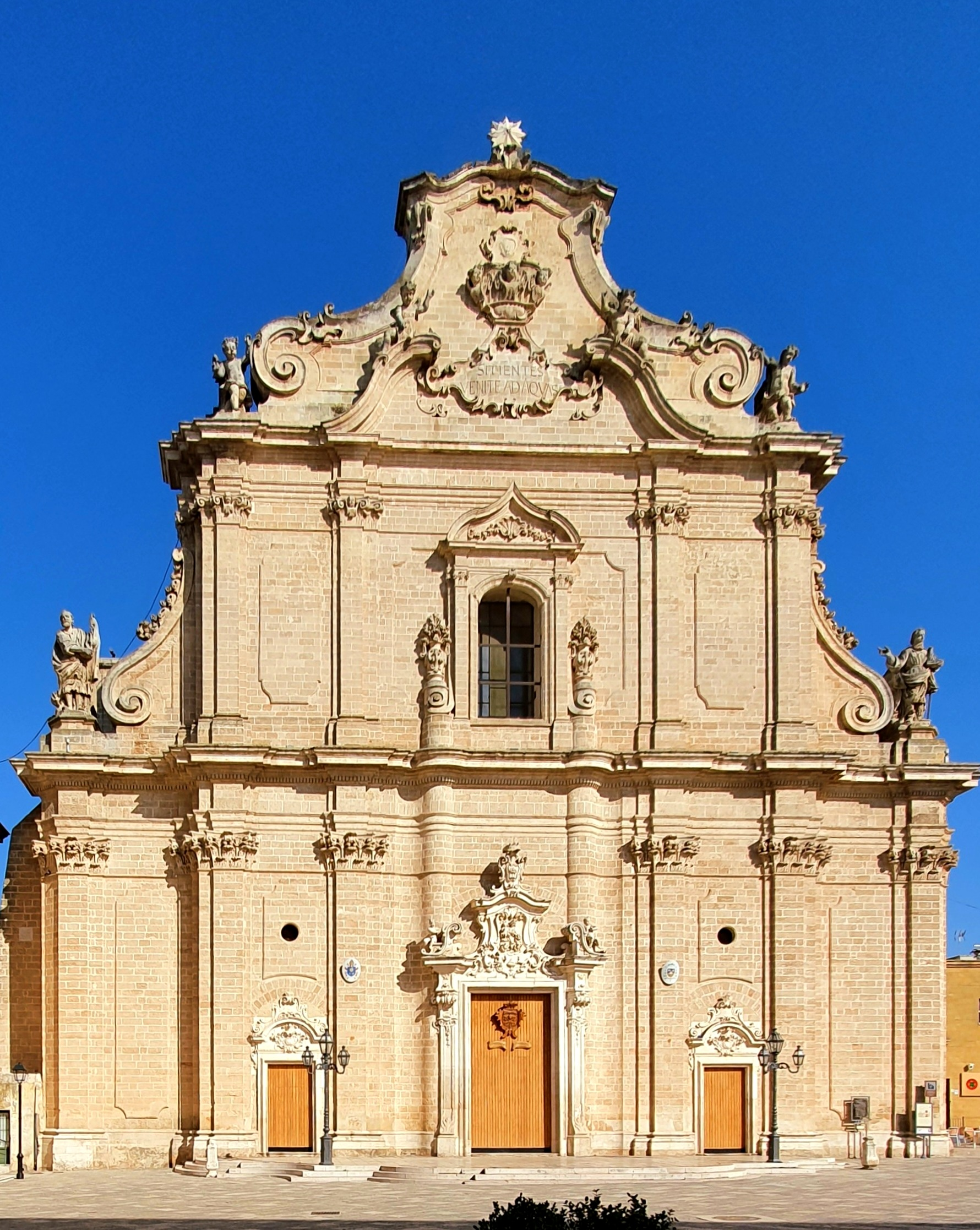
The baroque appearance of the new church built after the 1743 earthquake

According to some historians, after 1743, Prince Imperiali never returned to Francavilla.

=== The famine of 1753 ===
In 1753 news came from Rome and Naples of an impending famine. In that year Onorio Forleo had been made mayor, who had decided to fill the entire warehouse with reserves and foodstuffs. In 1764, as expected, the hardest period of the year began due to the famine, yet food was never completely lacking in Francavilla, nor did it sell at high prices. In the markets, wheat, broad beans, oats, and barley underwent considerable price increases; chickpeas and beans were completely lacking. At night, the mayor had all the gates patrolled by guards to prevent from bread being sold to outsiders. A few days later the peasants went on strike and started begging; Neapolitan merchants came to Francavilla and Manduria buying thousands of barrels full of wine, which they shipped by sea to their town, and to stem this phenomenon, which would have impoverished the town even more in provisions, and to avoid popular uprisings, Francavilla mayor Onorio Forleo ordered that bread be sold in only four stores, guarded by soldiers. In 1764 Forleo was succeeded by Giovanni Felice Basile.

=== Lightning strike ===
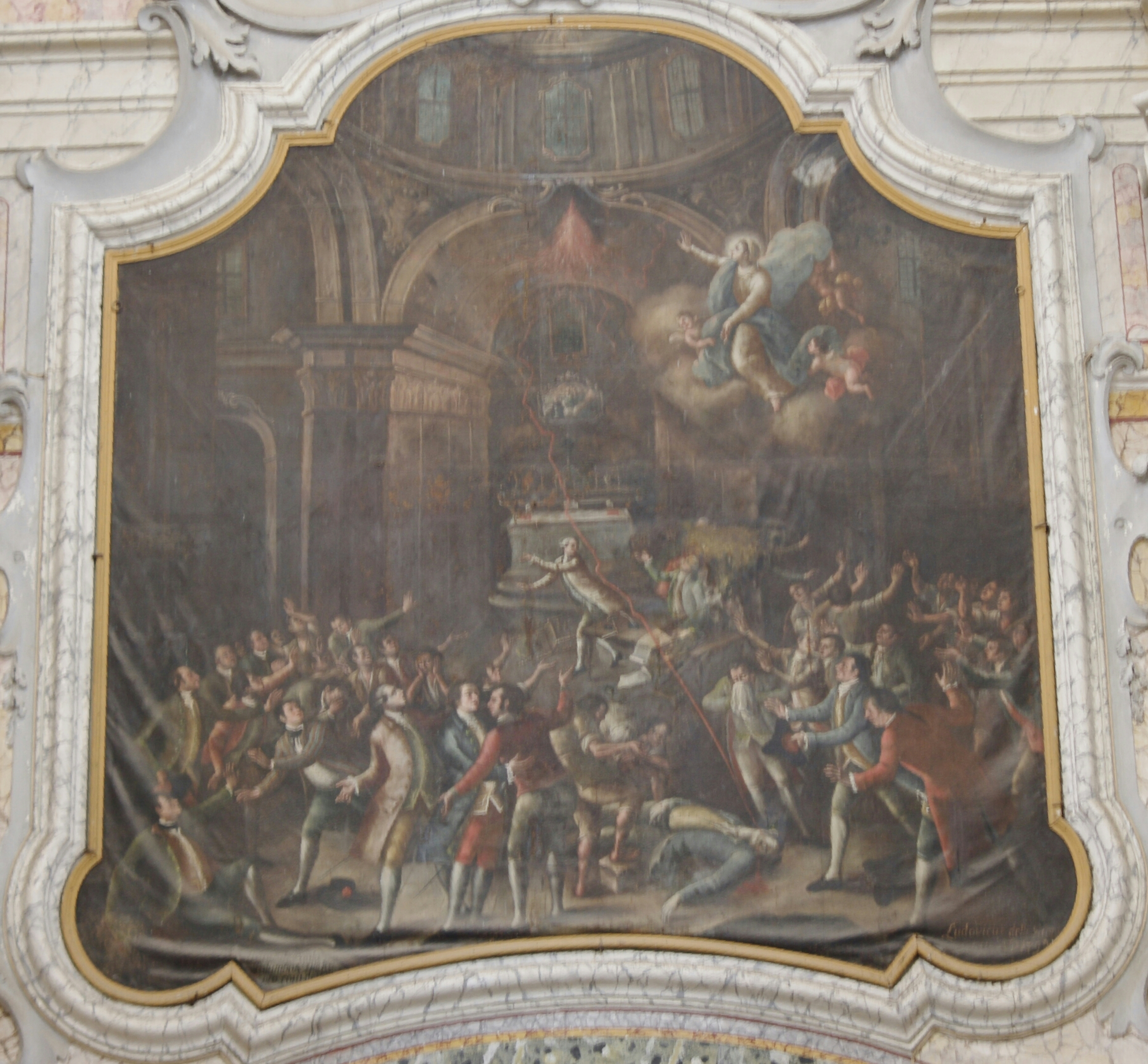
Painting by Ludovico Delli Guanti depicting the fall of lightning on Candita located in the Matrix Church (1799)

In 1777 Rocco Clavica became mayor supported by the squires, who went on to enrich them by squandering Francavilla's treasury, to the point that the Royal Chamber of Naples had to intervene. To avoid accountability for his stealing he managed to sabotage three councils, called Universities, held in the Mother Church, until it was decided to elect three rationals (officials fit to account) for March 28, 1779. Clavica's intentions, then, were to have only one rational elected, more specifically Giuseppe Gatti, to falsify the accounts. So on the evening of Sunday, March 28, he showed up with a crowd of gentlemen in his favor to try to convince them to vote for a single rational. The council soon became stormy, full of insults, accusations, and profanity, while outside the church stood the hungry people, mixed with other partisans of Clavica. As the vulgarities began to bend the will of even the most honest voters, the sky opened, bringing down two bolts of lightning. The first pierced the dome and struck one of the youngest and most turbulent of the Clavica faction, named Candita, and the second whirled around the Mother Church taking the right hand of twelve of the same faction. Later the council was dissolved because of threats to remove voters from their posts if they did not vote for Giuseppe Gatti, and a few days later Rocco Clavica was ousted from public office.

=== The end of the rule of the Imperiali ===
When the famine was over, the last prince of Francavilla died on February 10, 1782. Having had no children, he declared the marquis of Latiano, his relative, to be his universal heir; as he had no natural heir, the Royal Treasury began the process of devolving the fiefdom, noting and seizing all the prince's property and possessions; the marquis of Latiano, however, as heir, objected: a trial was opened and, in 1785, it was decided that all of the Imperiali's property would pass to the Revenue Agency, paying Vincenzo Imperiali, marquis of Latiano, 375,000 ducats (15,000 ducats per year). Thus to the marquis went the jewels, silverware, library, theater equipment, furniture, the Granatello villa and the title of marquis of Oria and prince of Francavilla.

During the 207 years of the Imperiali's rule, the city had been greatly enlarged, the neighborhoods and streets had become orderly; in addition, the conditions of the people and the level of culture had greatly improved.

=== The plague of 1783 and the invasion of the caterpillars ===
In 1783 the plague arrived in the Kingdom of Naples; in October the Francavilla authorities prohibited the introduction into the city of wood from Corsica, and later also from Dalmatia, Ragusa, and Castelnuovo. On April 28, 1784, the danger seemed averted, but in May the import of wood was again prohibited. In the same years as the plague there was an extraordinary invasion of caterpillars (already present in the province for centuries but never completely eliminated), which in a short time multiplied and almost entirely covered the fields; in May 1784, not knowing how to cope with such an attack, a procession was organized from the city to the chapel of St. Vitus, but the hoped-for miracle was not achieved. Thus, in Lecce, people asked what to do, and later people were sent to various quarters of Francavilla, who had the task of collecting the caterpillars in large sheets or burying them, but even this operation did not bring any results. Meanwhile, towards the end of May, the caterpillars had also spread to the interior of the city, in which wells were closed. The population, using all means to collect them, threw them back into the quarters or outside the walls: it continued in this way until the end of 1784. Later, in 1785 and 1786, clear and effective instructions were given on how to eliminate them.

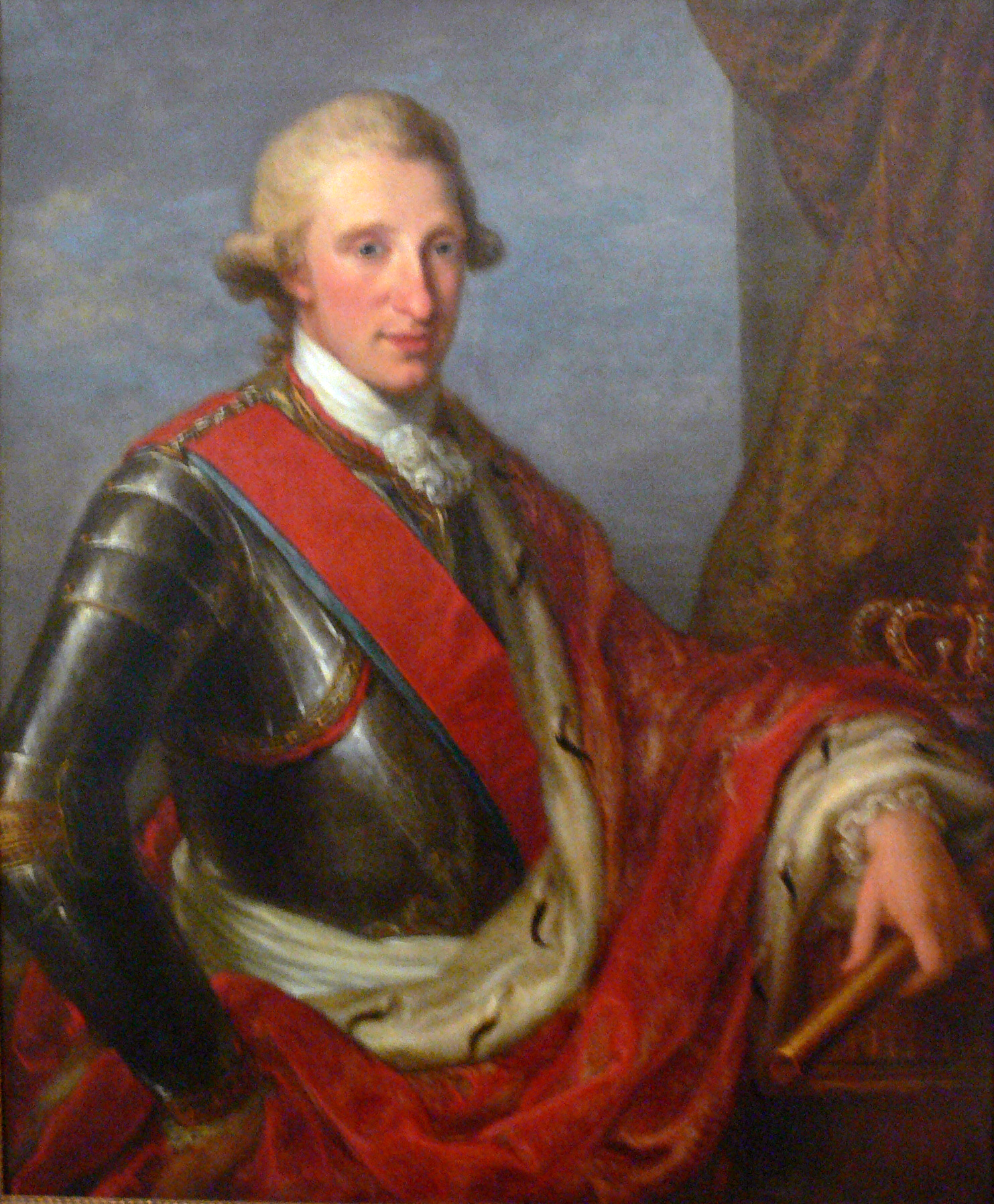
Portrait of Ferdinand I of the Two Sicilies, who declared the Land of Francavilla a "City"

=== From elevation to city status to revolutions against the Bourbons ===
On April 19, 1788, King Ferdinand I of the Two Sicilies declared the Land of Francavilla a City, and in 1797 the government allowed the new town to place three fleurs-de-lis on the city gates.

The effects of the French Revolution and libertarian ideas caused a real rift in the social fabric of the town, which saw numerous demonstrations, strikes and clashes. On February 11, 1799, in protest, a large number of peasants and workers did not go to work; in the square Giovanni Francesco del Re, Reader of the Pious Schools preached, from early morning until late evening, for freedom and the republic, calling it an institution willed by God. In the meantime, the Sanfedists prepared Bourbon cockades and weapons, although the chief of the guards told the population that there would be no fighting. At dawn on February 12, the Sanfedists went out into the streets with red cockades, rifles and sabers and arrived in the square, where the Tree of Liberty, hoisted by Jacobin Nicola Semeraro a few days earlier, had been affixed. The head of the guards ordered the square cleared, but just then a rifle shot went off, which, hitting the belt, hit his arm without killing him. This was the beginning of the revolt; Scazzeri, the leader of the guards, had to take refuge in a store, while in the square the Sanfedists clashed against the Republicans. Suddenly the clashes moved from the square and spread throughout the town.

A short time later, the Sanfedists found Nicola Semeraro, who, having fallen from the roof of his house to escape, had broken his leg and dislocated his shoulder; unable to move, he was stabbed and exposed in the square until evening. Seeing the critical situation, the mayor and the men of the University met in the Royal Court, finally deciding to have a squad of twelve armed soldiers, later increased to forty, guard the town throughout the night. Four people died in the clashes that day.

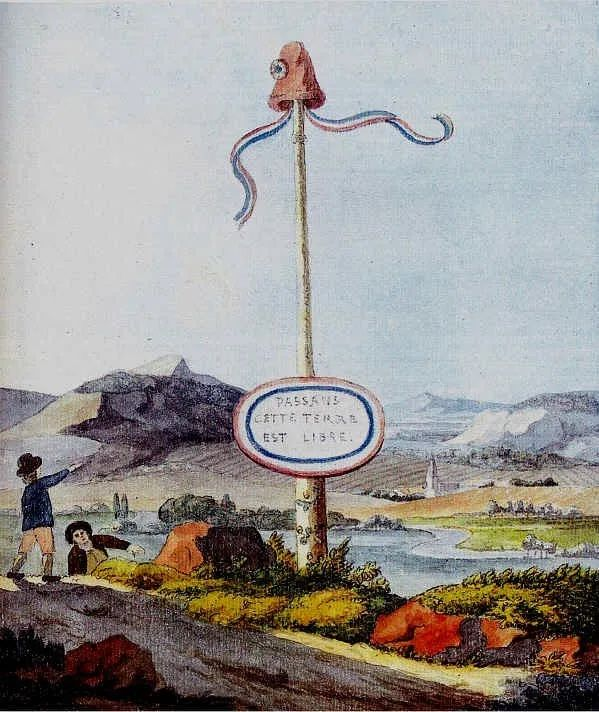
An example of the Tree of Liberty

=== The counteroffensive of the Bourbon army ===
On February 13, a procession with the statue of Our Lady was organized. Upon returning to the church, the priest Vito Nicola Alemanni, with a red cockade on his chest, shouted from the pulpit his loyalty to the king and affirmed that, thanks to a miracle of Our Lady, Francavilla had not been sacked by the Jacobins, and then urged calm and observance of the laws. Throughout the town, which was deserted by Jacobins, the population tried to organize to go around the districts and assault the farms where the republicans were taking refuge, only to be blocked by the soldiers, who intimated shooting on sight. On the same day Judge De Vincentiis sent a letter to Brindisi to ascertain the arrival of the crown prince and, after receiving an affirmative reply, he immediately set out to lead the Sanfedists. In the meantime the city was in complete disarray: the university was being manipulated by the shouters and, preparing against the French, had two cannons placed in the square. On February 24 the Bourbon envoys arrived, greeted by a jubilant crowd and numerous tapestries and trophies hung on the landmarks of the city. Immediately the plan for the defense of the city was presented, which called for the formation of a squad of forty-five soldiers by day and night, charged with guarding the city, the gates, the square, the prisons, and up to a mile outside the town. Soon after, calm returned, businesses and stores were reopened and processions were organized through the streets of the city. The festive reception and the town's central location made Francavilla the headquarters of the Bourbon counterattack; more cannons were therefore brought in and defense points were requested from the governors.

To prepare for the invasion of Bari, on March 25 of the same year the commanders of the Bourbon counterattack returned to Francavilla, where they were again greeted festively. The town proved very loyal; it gave guns, soldiers, wagons, couriers, clothing and workers; cannons were transported to Taranto, Martina Franca and Matera.

When Naples, too, was taken, Francavilla's landmarks were adorned with oil lamps, lanterns with festoons and portraits of the sovereigns. Later, on June 30, a long procession with the statue of Our Lady was held, also followed by the city's leading politicians; 2000 mortars and a cannon were also prepared.

== Contemporary age ==
=== French occupation ===
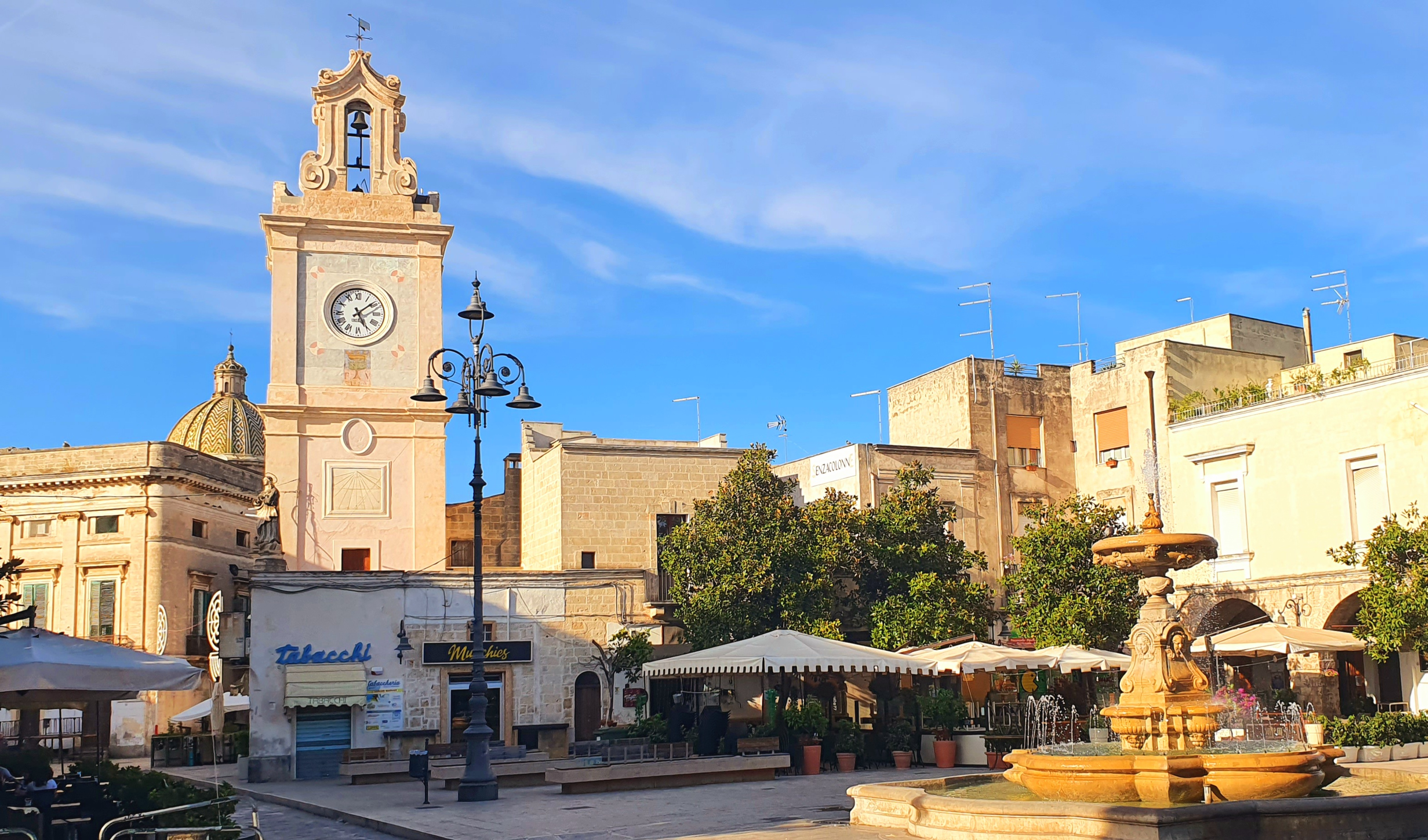
Umberto I Square, scene of numerous clashes

The Bourbons, fearing the entry of the French into the Kingdom of Naples, hastened to conclude with the transalpines the armistice of Foligno, on February 18, 1801, which, a month later, in Florence, was transformed into a definitive peace. In a secret article of the treaty, the Bourbons undertook to receive on the Adriatic coast, at Otranto, Brindisi and Taranto a corps of fifteen thousand Frenchmen, until peace was made with England, paying 120000 ducats per month. Thus Gouvion de Saint Cyr occupied Terra d'Otranto, stationing at Brindisi three battalions led by Miguel and between Taranto and Francavilla the commanding officer Roth. The University of Francavilla welcomed the French jubilantly and offered 326 ducats as a token of their appreciation. In this circumstance, too, the town became a center of soldiers since, under the pretext that the British had not yet left Malta, on March 23, 1802 Joseph Bonaparte ordered Saint Cyr to reoccupy Naples, placing garrisons in Pescara, Otranto, Brindisi and Taranto at Ferdinand's expense; in this way the university sent money, beds and carriages to Ostuni and Lecce.

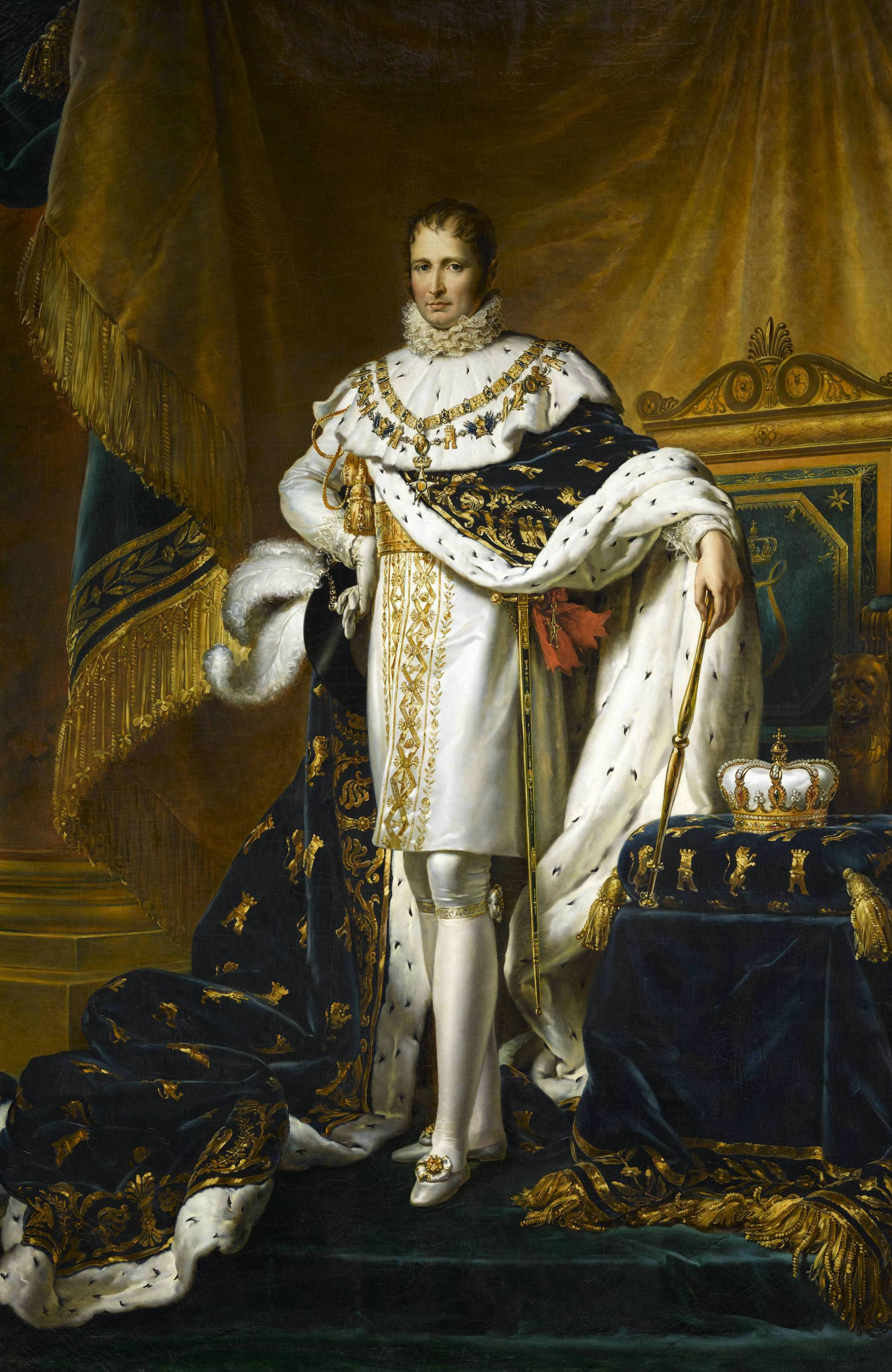
Portrait of Joseph Bonaparte by François Gérard, 1808

In 1803 the loyalty of the university, an exponent of a largely Sanfedist population, was questioned. For this reason, it had to send documents to Naples testifying to all the payments and festivities made in honor of the Royal Crown. In the same year, however, relations between France and the Kingdom of Naples were weakening considerably, until, in 1805, Napoleon Bonaparte won at Austerlitz and forced Ferdinand IV to flee to Sicily. On February 15, 1806, Joseph Bonaparte, Napoleon's brother, entered the royal palace, and plans were made to send troops throughout the kingdom to secure the new order of things: in July two hundred grenadiers passed through Taranto; from Francavilla Marcello Scazzeri and Achille Del Prete went to pay their respects to the commander, who nevertheless received them coldly, until Scazzeri showed the wound in his arm caused by a Sanfedist weapon. In light of this Scazzeri was appointed general of the Legionaries and Del Prete captain.

=== The sack attempt in Francavilla ===
One night in April 1809 a group of Oritanians, driven by hatred of the Francavilla people, planned to make a sack in Francavilla. The plan was foiled by a well-to-do man from Oria, who, wishing to avoid a massacre, escaped from Oria and entered Francavilla to warn the soldiers: stopped by a guard, the Oritanian citizen told all about the sack plan, and the frightened guard ran to the officer, who had arrived the night before with fifty French soldiers on horseback. Hearing riots coming from the road leading to Oria, the officer ordered the Carmine gate to be opened and the town guard to remain inside the town. In this way the rioters ran toward the open gates but were surprised by the cavalry: the invaders retreated by firing and were followed for a long time; most of them were killed. Two months later the one who had organized the attempted sack of the city was imprisoned in Francavilla and transported to Taranto Castle for interrogation. After revealing the names of the accomplices, under the orders of General Manhès, many people were arrested and killed in various nearby towns. In Oria, for example, twenty-one people were hanged in a single day.

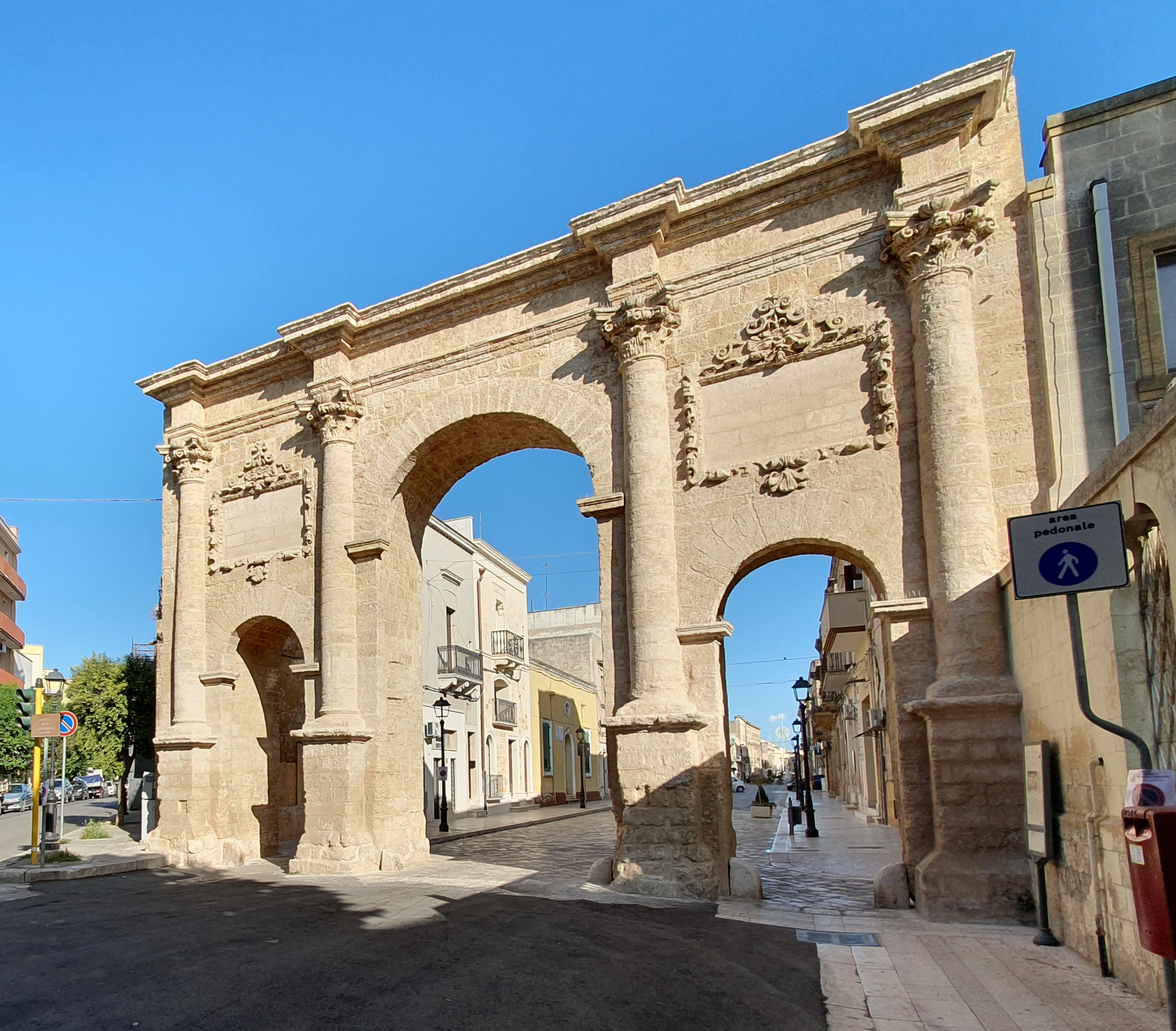
Carmine Gate

=== Freemasonry and Brigandage ===
In 1816 Francavilla, given its importance in the Terra d'Otranto (it is the fourth city in the district in order of population) was elevated to district capital, within the district of Brindisi.

In these years Freemasonry was well represented: the first Carbonari cell Nuova Rudiae was followed by the Villafranca and in their midst various sects among which those of the Calderari and the Decisi were important, the latter ruling over Francavilla. Meanwhile, the Kingdom of the Two Sicilies, unable to tolerate this situation, organized to eliminate all the sects: Richard Church, recently appointed Major General, left Naples in 1817 and went to Barletta to oppose the Vardarelli. After traveling to many other areas in Apulia, he also arrived in Francavilla on October 25. At the same time, the sects were also organizing. Ciro Annunchiarico, one of the leading local exponents of brigandage, tried to bring all the sects together so that they could put up more resistance to the army; in a short time he was able to find money, weapons, men and horses. In early January 1818, the Decisi sect instructed Annunchiarico to kill Church. The brigand, gathering in San Marzano di San Giuseppe all his followers, studied how to get out of the Francavilla-Grottaglie-San Marzano triangle; however, Church was informed of the plan and sent soldiers to attack the village. After a bitter battle, many brigands were killed, others taken to Francavilla, but Don Ciro had managed to escape. On January 27 Church, after being informed about yet another meeting of the Decisi in Grottaglie that night, sent soldiers. The sectarians were all bound and the items found there were sent to Francavilla.

After issuing a five-day ultimatum within which the inhabitants of San Marzano and Grottaglie were to surrender the brigand and at the end of which, without answers, he would destroy all the houses, it was discovered that Annunchiarico had taken refuge at the Scasserba tower. After a long siege, the brigands surrendered and were captured by soldiers. Ciro Annunchiarico, soon after his arrest, was taken to Francavilla. The military commission, placed in Francavilla, resolved to shoot the leader of the brigands. On February 8, Ciro Annunchiarico was led to the square and shot. He was later beheaded and his head, locked in a cage, was hung on the clock tower in the square. During the course of the year, a total of 227 people were put on trial, many of whom were shot. Some time later, a government official sent by the king, after discussions with representatives of the city, resolved that Church should leave Francavilla and take up his position in Lecce.

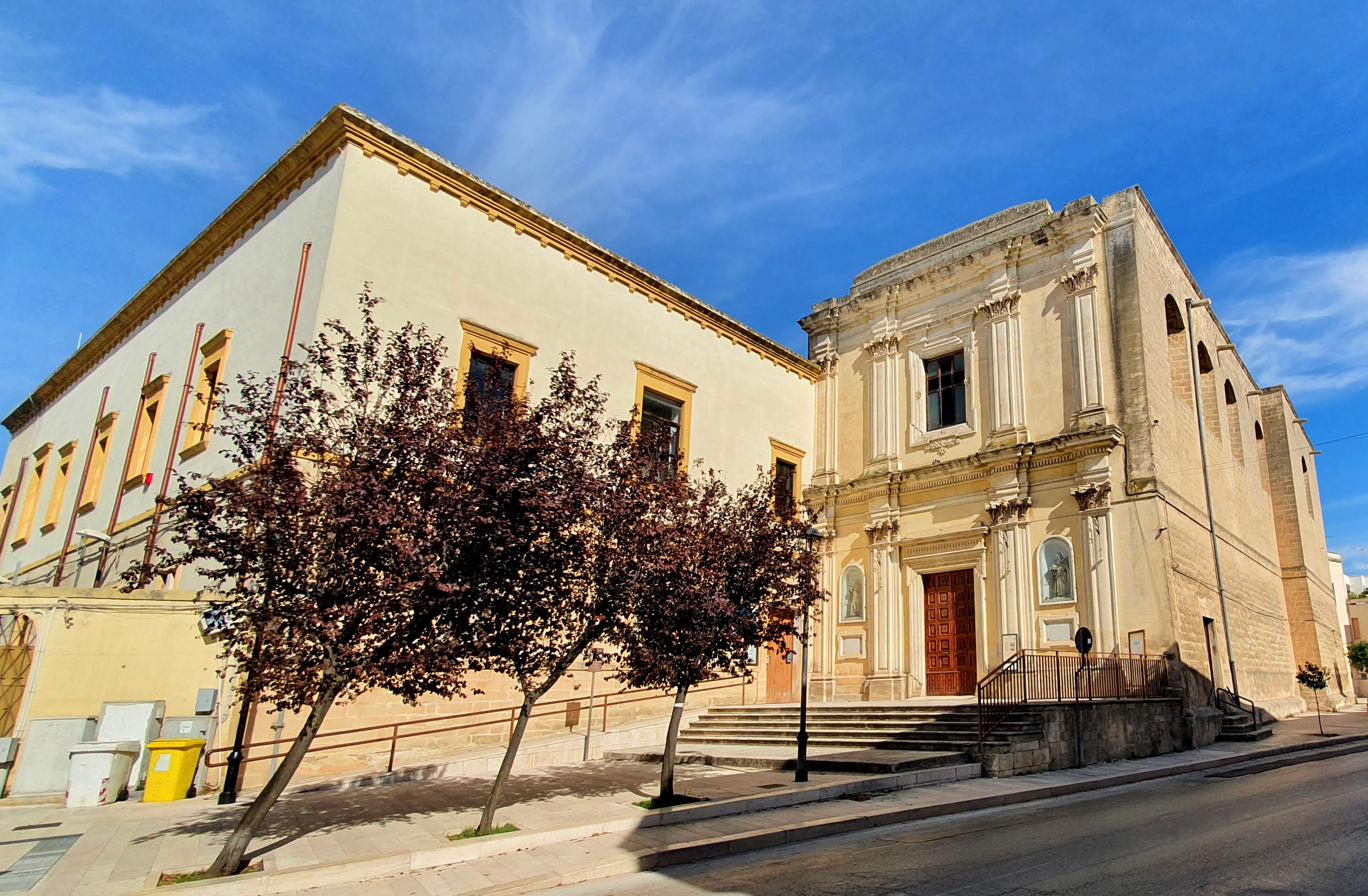
Church and former convent of the Carmelites

=== The closure of the convents and the project for the municipal cemetery ===
Shortly after the enactment of the new laws on the suppression of convents and the abolition of feudalism, the Convents of Carmine, Pious Schools, San Biagio and the Black Franciscans, all very wealthy and popular institutions, were closed in Francavilla. However, in 1818 a contract was made with the church in which a commitment was made to reorganize the dioceses, sales of church property were ratified, and the Convents were also reestablished; therefore, almost all the previously suppressed convents were reoccupied by religious orders. During this period, Liguorini Fathers, who had already arrived in 1718 and 1793, also arrived in Francavilla.

In 1821 the castle returned to the ownership of the municipality, which until then had been occupied by the governor, the gendarmes and some stores. At the same time a law was enacted obliging all municipalities to build a cemetery outside the town; this was not viewed well by the population, which considered it a desecration. However, after much vain resistance, the Francavilla mayor commissioned the project.

=== The cholera of 1836 and the start of public works ===
In 1836 cholera arrived, at first undetected and mistaken for plague or high fever; a cordon sanitaire was put in place in Francavilla and all exits from the town were closed. The average death toll during the peak of the epidemic was 20-25 people a day. Churches were filled with corpses, and the feast of Our Lady of the Fountain was celebrated in October. Due to the high number of deaths, it was decided to transfer all the corpses to the new cemetery and leave only those belonging to wealthy families in the church, incurring the wrath of the population.

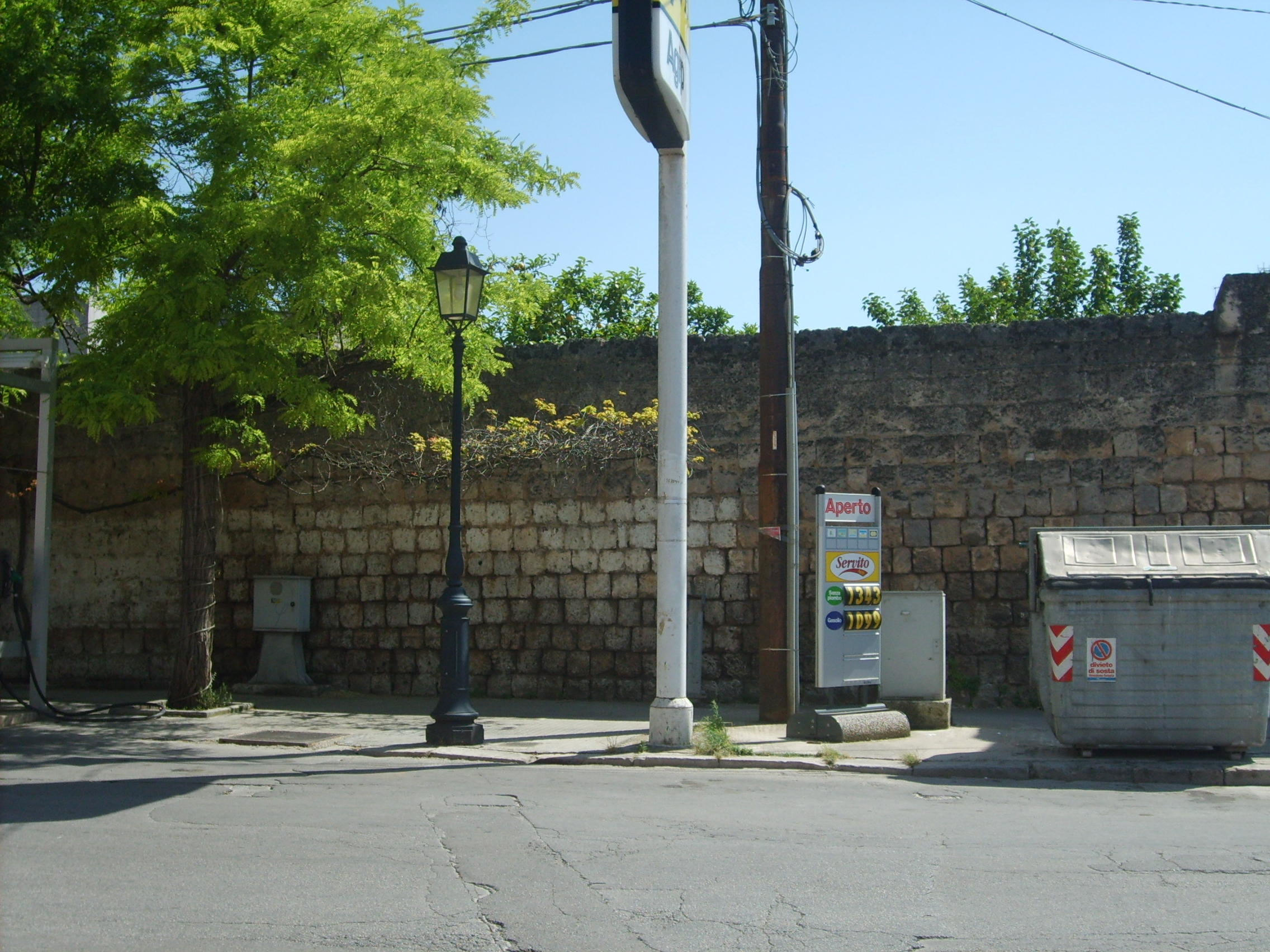
Part of the remains of the eighteenth-century wall

Once the epidemic was over, numerous public works began, such as the completion of the city's main arteries and the construction of roads connecting neighboring towns. New buildings and churches were erected in the city, and in 1838 construction began on the Borgo della Croce, the first to climb over the 18th-century walls, with a row of houses that stretched as far as the Convent of the Friars Minor; the wide space in front of the collegiate church was further enlarged in 1845, with the demolition of some stores.

With the promulgation of the Albertine Statute in 1848, great celebrations were held throughout Italy: even in Francavilla, where there was Young Italy, a large demonstration was organized with the participation of all classes of citizens. Tricolor flags and cockades were hoisted and numerous liberal cafes decorated with tents and tricolor flags were opened. A short time later, in 1852, the idea of establishing a "Monte Frumentario" in Francavilla as well was discussed, with the 477 ducats obtained that year from the Macinato, so that they could be used for works of public utility; the proposal was accepted, but since the sum was not enough, alms from citizens had to be used as well. In 1854 cholera returned and cordon sanitaires and lazarettos were reinstalled in all municipalities. In Francavilla the efforts of the Daughters of Charity, who, since 1847, had lived in the Castle and taught more than two hundred girls, caused great admiration. In the same years, meanwhile, the construction of a new hospital was being accomplished.

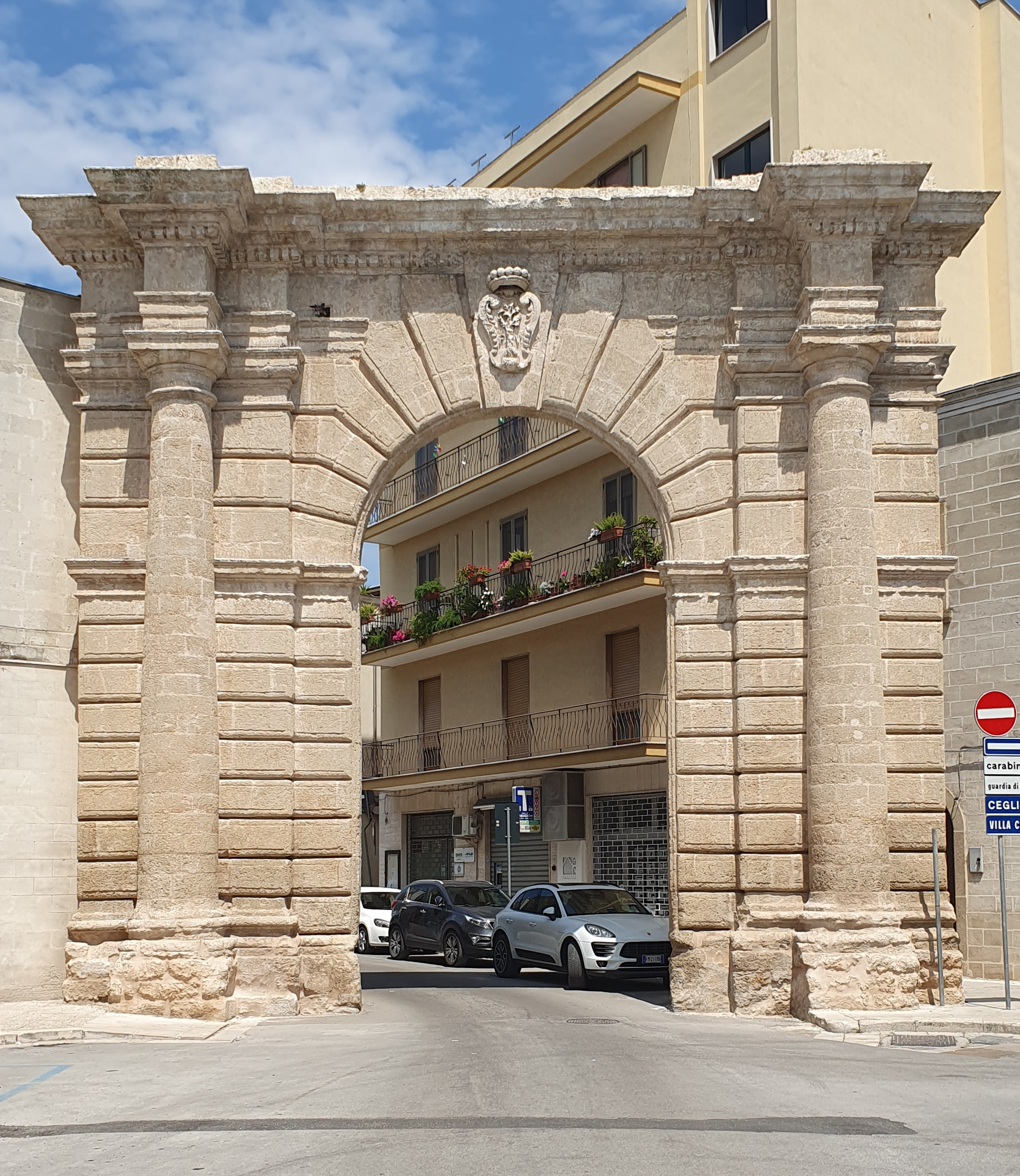
The Gate of the Cross was the first to be bypassed by the settlement

At that time there were also works of modernization and enlargement of the town, which had about 20,000 inhabitants in the years of Italian Unification.

In sixty years, Francavilla increased by eight thousand inhabitants: from 1776 to 1848 the population went from eleven thousand to nineteen thousand. The bourgeoisie became more and more cultured, attending the town's numerous schools. Meanwhile, the fringes of the square, which used to be filled with grain, began to be abandoned.

=== The arrival of the Thousand ===
Shortly afterwards, news of the landing in Sicily of Garibaldi and the Thousand also reached Francavilla, and in the meantime insurrections began, such as the one on July 26, in which some of the Bourbon members were attacked. After the resignation of Mayor Longo and the removal of the Elected finally fell the Bourbon government in the city and a Provisional Government was created.

On October 21 of the same year there was a plebiscite on whether or not to choose a united and indivisible Italy with Victor Emmanuel as constitutional king and his legitimate heirs. In Francavilla the political event was greatly felt by the people: houses were decorated with flags, large placards with the words YES were displayed in the streets, and a stage was built in the square on which voters climbed up and down. The office was presided over by the mayor together with the Captains of the National Guard. In the Terra d'Otranto the registered voters were 111951, the abstainers 16452, the voters in favor were 94570 and those against 929. In all the cities great celebrations were prepared: in the square of Francavilla a large papier-mâché statue depicting the king was displayed and great patriotic speeches were made (even in the church).

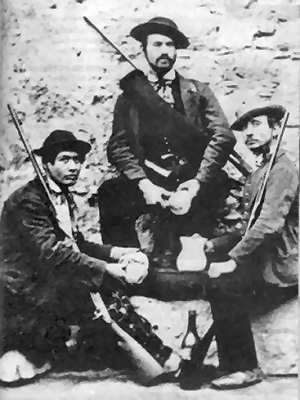
A group of brigands

=== The return of brigandage ===
Meanwhile, the issue of brigandage increased in importance: in 1861 a state of siege and disarmament was proclaimed in the city; the Cavalrymen of Aosta also arrived, and on October 23 of that year Prefect Gemelli had an edict posted ordering the mayors to create two lists: one on brigand advocates and the other on those absent from the municipality without justification. It was also ordered that accomplices, receivers and supporters of the brigands, thieves, idlers and vagabonds, rascals, stragglers, unlicensed bearers or holders of weapons and propagators of false alarms be arrested or searched. Later it was ordered that citizens retire to the countryside and that farms be closed, taking livestock to safe places, while causing serious damage to the agricultural sector. In February 1863 the first Delegate of Public Safety arrived in the municipality.

Francavilla, until 1863, was distinguished from the other nine namesake towns by the attribute of Otranto, but a decree of February 18, 1864 sanctioned the new attribute of Fontana, in memory of the famous finding of the icon at a spring.

From 1848 to 1866 the population of Francavilla increased (although the figures reported in the documents are not considered exact): in 1848 it was written 19,000 (according to many an exaggerated figure); in 1863 the municipality reported the presence of 17,869 inhabitants; the following year the government recorded 17609 people.

=== The new healthcare, education and infrastructure works ===
With the arrival of funds from the central government, many public works began both inside and outside the city: they began with the construction of a road that ran all around the walls, which at that time were in a state of disrepair. Later, efforts were also made to reclaim the districts, which were very unsafe places. In this period almost all the work of urban reorganization and reconstruction of streets, palaces and churches was entrusted to Luigi Fumagalli; many streets and sidewalks were rearranged, and in 1865, on the occasion of the visit of the crown prince, the elevation of the prisons was redone, the police office was improved by adding iron gates and painting, and some rooms in the castle were decorated. In these years the question of the Taranto-Brindisi railway also arose: already during the Bourbons a project for a railway that would reach Brindisi, but without reaching Francavilla, was discussed; after numerous negotiations, on April 10, 1865 it was concluded that the railway would pass through Taranto and all the towns located on the line to Brindisi.

In 1867 the city was invaded for the third time by a new cholera epidemic: all roads leading out of the city were closed again. The epidemic, which lasted from June 17 to August 30, caused eleven to nineteen deaths a day.

Once the epidemic was over, hygienic and educational improvements were continued, eliminating the open emanation of fumes from the workshops and opening new elementary schools, a Gymnasium and a kindergarten. In addition, in 1875, the Electric Telegraph was opened on the first floor of the castle.

=== Villa Castelli's independence and clashes with Oria ===
Meanwhile, the question of Villa Castelli's independence was also growing in importance: having arrived in 1871 with 1,900 inhabitants, it was tending more and more toward independence from Francavilla; several years earlier a request was made for separation from the capital and annexation to Ceglie Messapica, but this was immediately rejected. In 1862 they turned to the Provincial Council, which on November 3, 1863 declared that the village was not in a suitable condition to self-govern itself. In 1871 a Capuchin friar, parish priest of the church of the Santissimo Crocefisso in Villa Castelli, filed a request with the province of Terra d'Otranto for the unification of the Francavilla hamlet with the town of Grottaglie, denouncing the neglect and abandonment in which it was kept by the town of Francavilla Fontana. In 1891, with the formation of a committee, the call for the formation of an independent municipality was made official; thus two opposing factions were formed: the Whites (Democrats, Liberals and Catholics), who placed themselves at the head of the struggles for independence, and the Blacks (Reactionaries and Conservatives) backed by the parish priest Caliandro, who turned out to be fence sitters and colluded with the Francavilla misrule: a letter sent by Caliandro to the Duce highlights a collusion between the archpriest and the fascist regime. The verbal clashes became increasingly heated during Francavilla's City Council meetings and saw the pressing demands of the Castellan councilors. It was only after the resolution of the Chamber of Deputies on May 25, 1923 that the process for independence officially began. The consequence was the accentuation of neglect and prevarication on the part of the capital city.

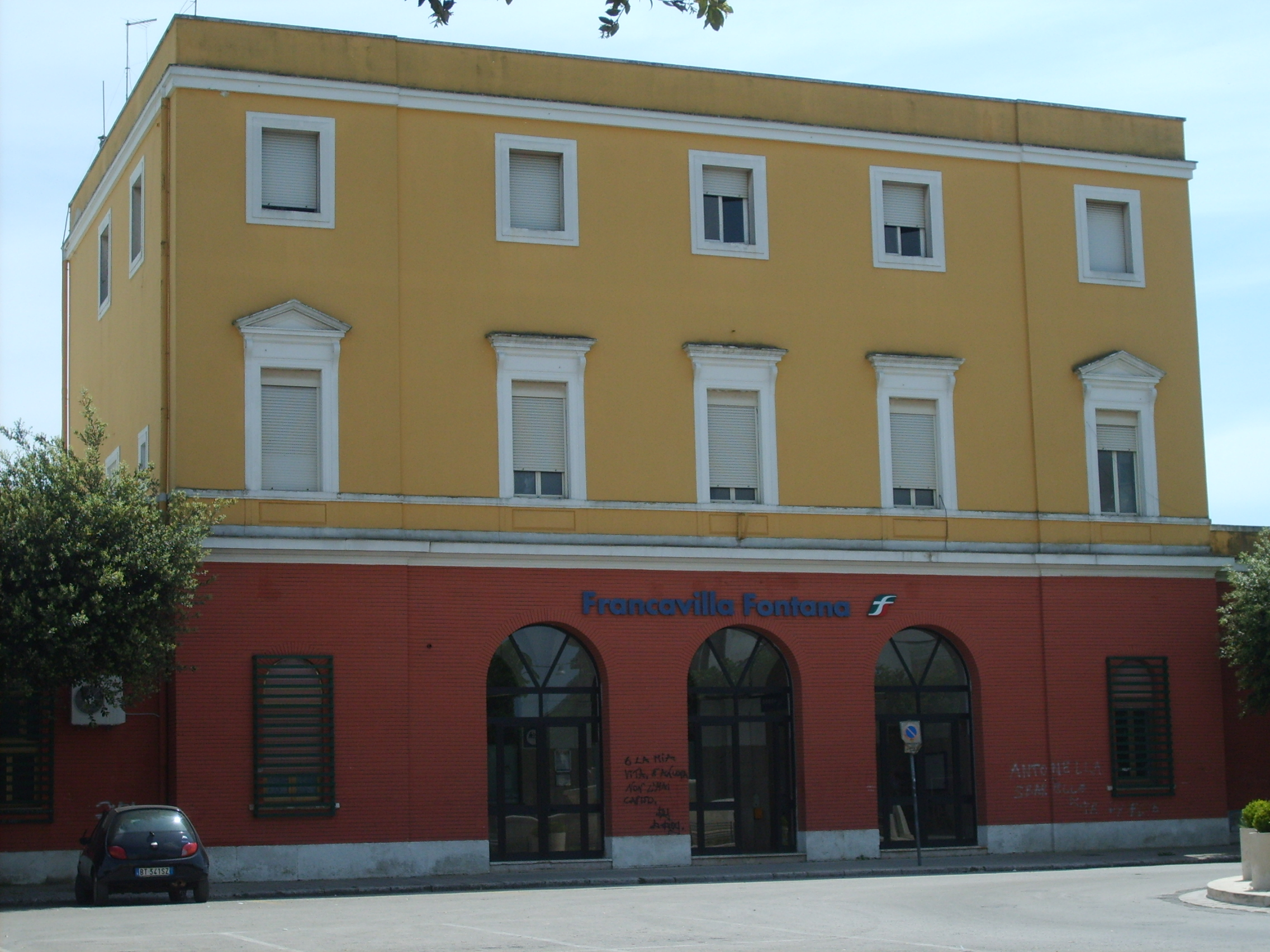
Francavilla station

In 1880 the riots between Oritanians and Francavillans returned; after numerous clashes and arrests by the Carabinieri, more than five thousand Francavillese peasants made their way to the jails and destroyed them, freeing those arrested. The clashes, thus, continued and escalated, so much so that soldiers from Brindisi, Taranto, Bari and Lecce arrived to keep the situation under control.

=== The railroad project and construction ===
Even with the dangers of revolt and clashes, public works continued: a few years earlier work had begun on the roads leading to San Marzano, Carosino and Sava; the cemetery was enlarged and one was planned in Villa Castelli as well; work was done to renovate the prisons, the Convent of San Biagio and the first floor and basement of the castle, where some skeletons and a few inscriptions were found in 1880. Meanwhile, work on the railroad also continued. On February 27, 1883, the then Minister of Public Works Alfredo Baccarini came to Francavilla from Lecce and was welcomed at the Porta del Carmine by councilors and the Workers' Society.

In addition to the Taranto-Brindisi railway project, thought was also given to the construction of a railway that, starting from the center of the Taranto-Brindisi, would join the Zollino-Gallipoli, connecting the districts of Taranto, Brindisi and Gallipoli. In addition, on October 20, 1885, a consortium was formed between the municipalities of Martina Franca, Locorotondo, Alberobello, Ceglie Messapica, Gioia del Colle, and Francavilla Fontana for the construction of the Gioia-Francavilla line, which, in addition to being connected to the other railway lines, would join the ports of Taranto and Brindisi, thus increasing its strategic importance especially in times of war. On January 4, 1886, the Minister of Public Works arrived in Bari for the inauguration of the railway, and in all the towns reached by the Taranto-Brindisi line there were great celebrations.

=== The arrival of the Seventh Disciplinary Unit and the Red Cross ===
After the outbreak of another cholera epidemic, the mayor decided that the hygienic issue in the city had become too important to continue to be ignored: therefore, after making numerous profits from the sale of land and receiving loans from the state, the resurfacing of the main roads began.

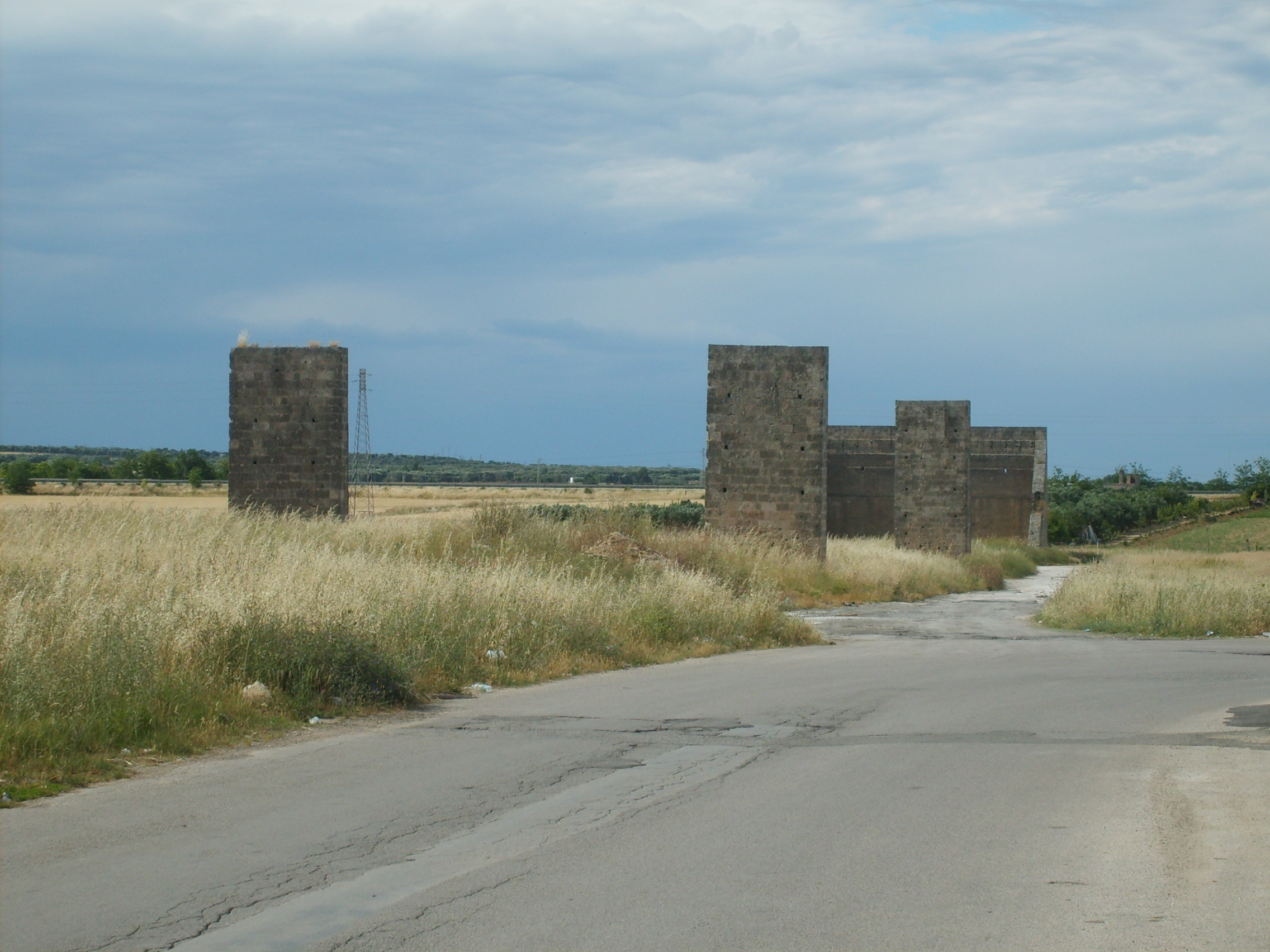
Former shooting range

In 1896 the Bari Command requested to the mayor whether it would be possible to install in the town the Seventh Disciplinary Unit, which had been wanted by the population for some time. Thus began the construction of barracks adequate to the required needs and, in September, the first sixty soldiers arrived. Meanwhile, the shooting range, still visible today a short distance from the hospital, was also built in the town, and the Red Cross was established, which became very popular during the frequent cholera epidemics.

On June 24, 1899, the installation of electric light was proposed, thus eliminating the old oil lighting, but although the proposal was approved, it was not implemented immediately.

=== From the 20-year fascist period to the present ===
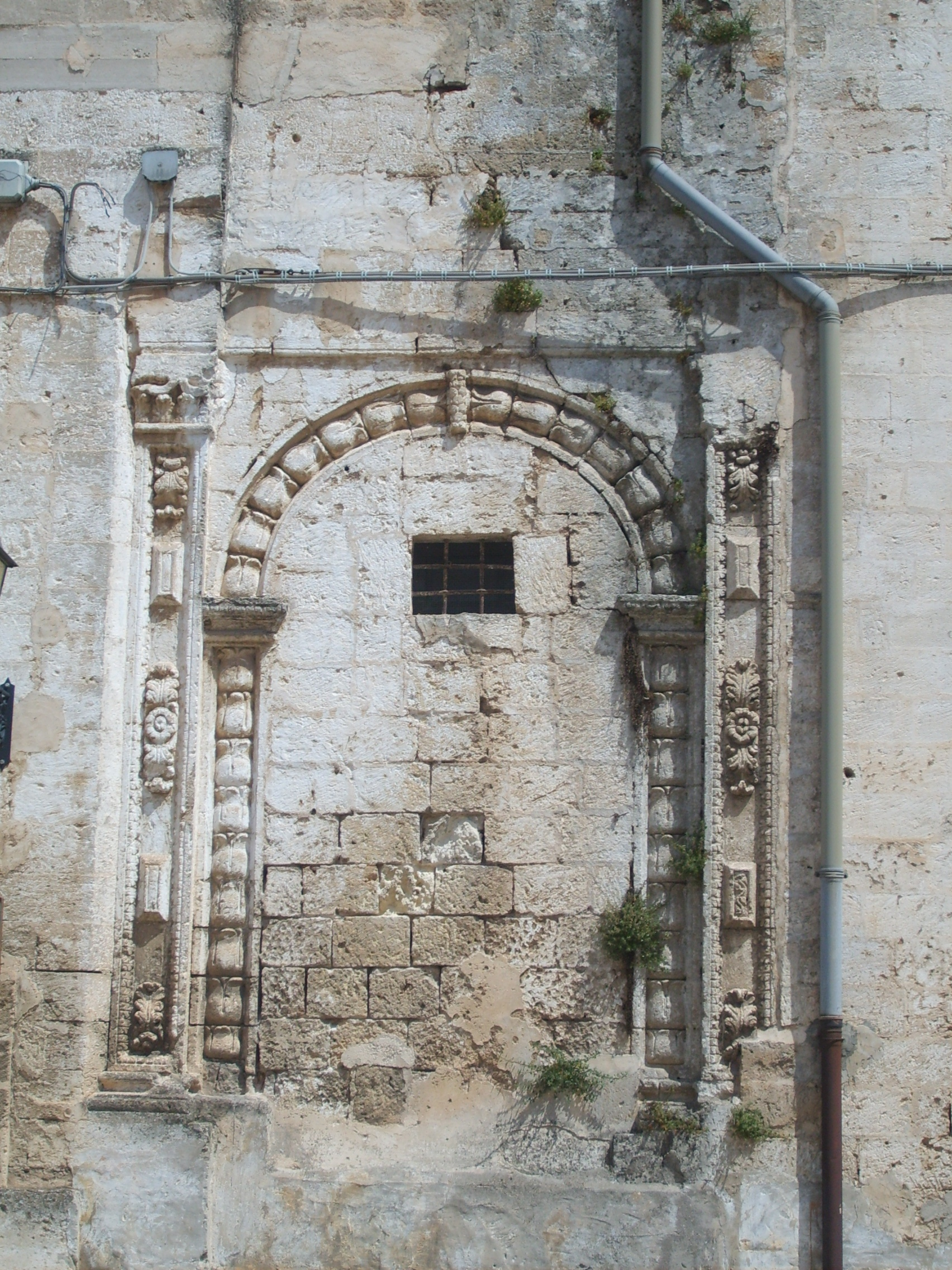
17th century walled portal of the former Poor Clares convent, destroyed during fascism

During the Fascist twenty-year period, the city underwent numerous urban redevelopment interventions, which brought benefits, such as the construction of new wards, the municipal stadium or the enlargement of Piazza Umberto I, all of which, however, also caused problems, as in the case of the urban reconfiguration of the nineteenth-century Liguorini ward, which was modified to make room for a school complex.

In 1923 Francavilla became part of the newly formed Province of Taranto.

In 1926, after numerous clashes and street demonstrations, during which the then mayor of Francavilla Luigi Andriani was lynched on Easter Monday 1925, Villa Castelli, thanks to the votes of Specchia Tarantina, Monte Fellone (hamlets of Martina Franca) and Mannara (hamlet of Grottaglie), reached the sum of 4,000 voters and was definitively constituted as a new municipality with the delivery of the municipal heraldic coat of arms. Cavalier Ostillio of Taranto was appointed first administrator.

In 1927, Francavilla entered the newly established province of Brindisi.

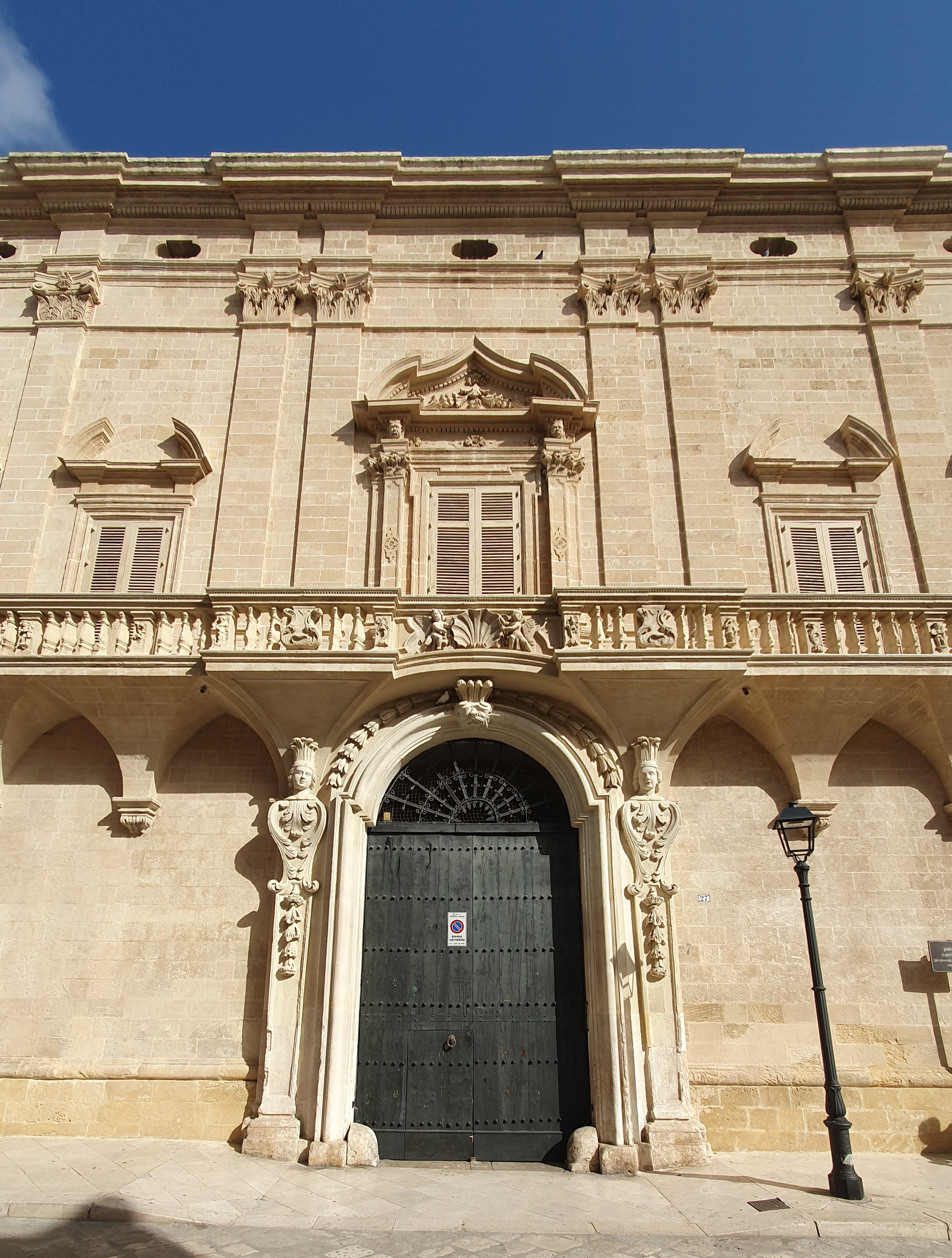
View of the portal of Palazzo Carissimo

During World War II in Francavilla, several generals and commanders were housed in the Palazzo Carissimo, including Francesco Pricolo, Undersecretary of State and Chief of Staff of the Air Force and Army General. In conjunction with the temporary relocation of the Supreme Military Command at the railway station, Benito Mussolini, housed in General Perrucci's villa located near Grottaglie, and other heads of military ministries also stayed in the city for three days. They awaited the arrival in Taranto of Galeazzo Ciano, who was returning from Albania. Already since 1940 the Naval Hospital had been operating in the city, housing wounded and military personnel mainly from Greece.

After the Armistice of Cassibile on September 8, 1943, the British advanced on Italian territory and clashed with the Germans, especially in central Italy. In this way, numerous refugees from Abruzzo arrived in Francavilla, who had fled their land because of the violent clashes and were settled in municipal and private premises. During this period, the commands of the VIII Army and the LI Army Corps also arrived in the town. At the end of the conflict, the fallen Francavilla residents numbered 157, including civilians and soldiers.

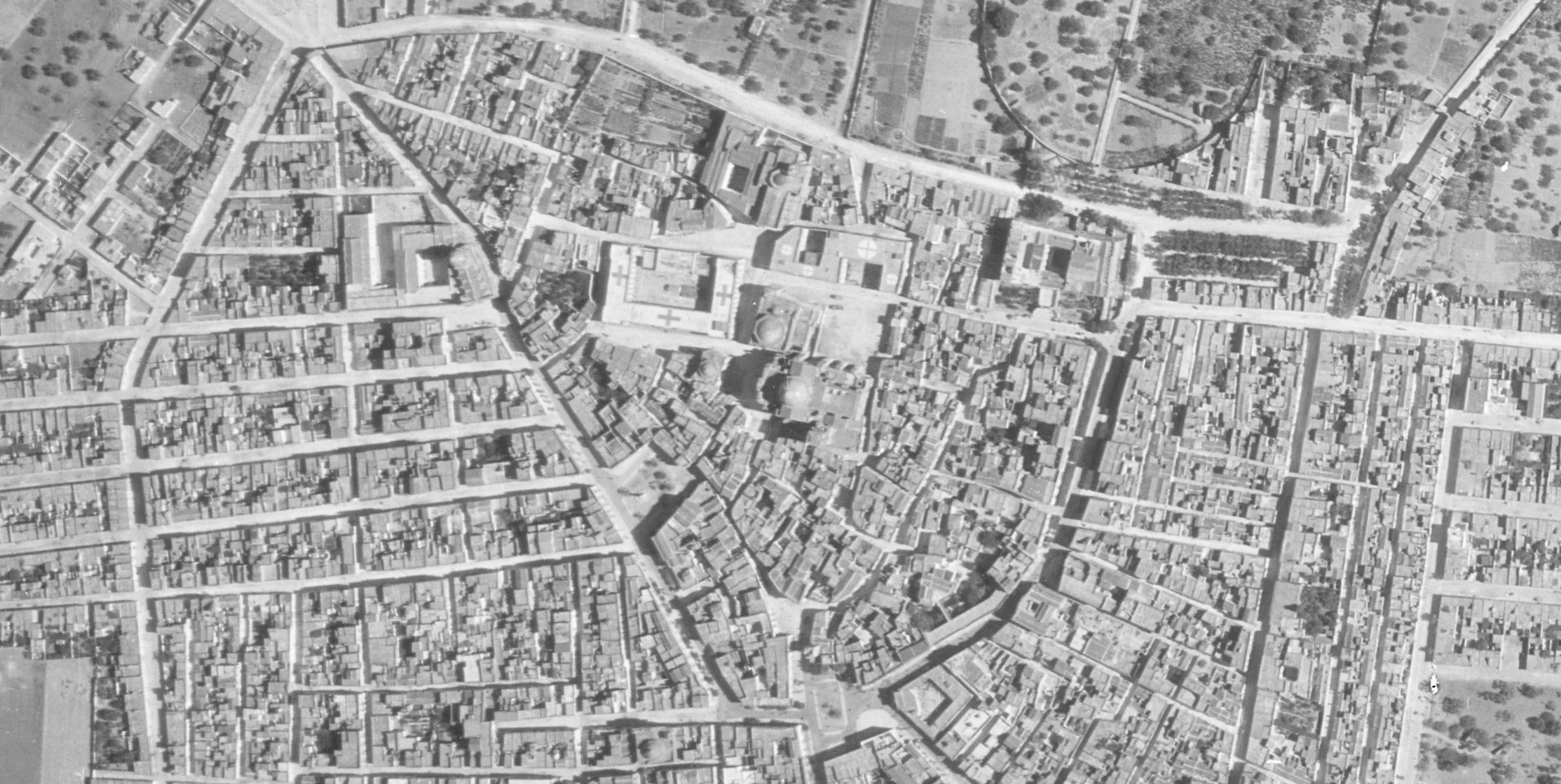
View of the historic center in 1943

On the night of May 8-9, 1945, the city experienced one of its darkest moments: a mob of communists, due to heavy arguments, went to the home of fascists Francesco and Salvatore Chionna, who defended themselves by shooting and killing communists Cosimo Carrieri and Cosimo Pesce. After setting fire to the house, the crowd forced the two men out of their home and exposed them to the shooting. The following day, the bodies of the two fascists were hung in Umberto I Square, doused with gasoline and burned.

As for the referendum of June 2, 1946, in Francavilla there were 8337 votes in favor of the monarchy and 3342 in favor of the republic. In the fall of that year, following the local elections, Vincenzo Barbaro, a member of the Democratic Citizen's Union, was elected mayor.

After the end of the war, reconstruction was slow, partly because the cities of Brindisi and Taranto had been hard hit during the conflict. It was only after the 1960s that the city began to make significant progress, aided by the construction of large industrial plants in the two adjacent capitals, which in turn allowed for the creation of a fair amount of allied industries and the construction of infrastructure works.

== See also ==
- Francavilla Fontana

== Bibliography ==
- Argentina, Alessandro (1994). Francavilla Fontana. Ricordi. Levante. ISBN 88-7949-070-2.
- Fulgenzio Clavica e Rosario Jurlaro, ed. (2007). Francavilla Fontana. Milano: Mondadori Electa.
- Fulgenzio Clavica e Regina Poso, ed. (1990). Francavilla Fontana. Architettura e immagine. Galatina: Congedo.
- Coco, Primaldo (1988). Francavilla Fontana nella luce della storia. Galatina: Congedo Editore. ISBN 88-7786-088-X.
- Angela Marinazzo, Viaggio in terra di Brindisi. Turismo, storia, arte, folklore, Mario Adda Editore, 2000, ISBN 88-8082-408-2.
- Palumbo, Pietro (1901). Storia di Francavilla Fontana. Arnaldo Forni.
- Vittoria Ribezzi Petrosillo, Fulgenzio Clavica e Mario Cazzato (a cura di), Guida di Francavilla Fontana. La città degli Imperiali, Galatina, Congedo, 1995, ISBN 88-8086-102-6.
