= List of municipalities of the Province of Brindisi =

The following is a list of the 20 municipalities (comuni) of the Province of Brindisi in the region of Apulia in Italy.

== List ==
Municipality	Population (2026)	Area (km^{2})	Density
Brindisi	81,181	332.98	243.8
Carovigno	17,093	106.62	160.3
Ceglie Messapica	18,363	132.02	139.1
Cellino San Marco	5,889	37.84	155.6
Cisternino	10,954	54.17	202.2
Erchie	8,041	44.63	180.2
Fasano	38,747	131.72	294.2
Francavilla Fontana	34,352	177.94	193.1
Latiano	13,222	55.38	238.8
Mesagne	25,738	124.05	207.5
Oria	14,364	83.67	171.7
Ostuni	29,803	225.56	132.1
San Donaci	6,050	34.04	177.7
San Michele Salentino	6,006	26.53	226.4
San Pancrazio Salentino	8,958	56.68	158.0
San Pietro Vernotico	12,807	46.94	272.8
San Vito dei Normanni	17,793	67.08	265.3
Torchiarolo	5,286	32.34	163.5
Torre Santa Susanna	10,045	55.77	180.1
Villa Castelli	8,939	35.15	254.3

== See also ==
- List of municipalities of Apulia
- List of municipalities of Italy
