= Terra d'Otranto (extra-virgin olive oil) =

Protected origin extra-virgin olive oil

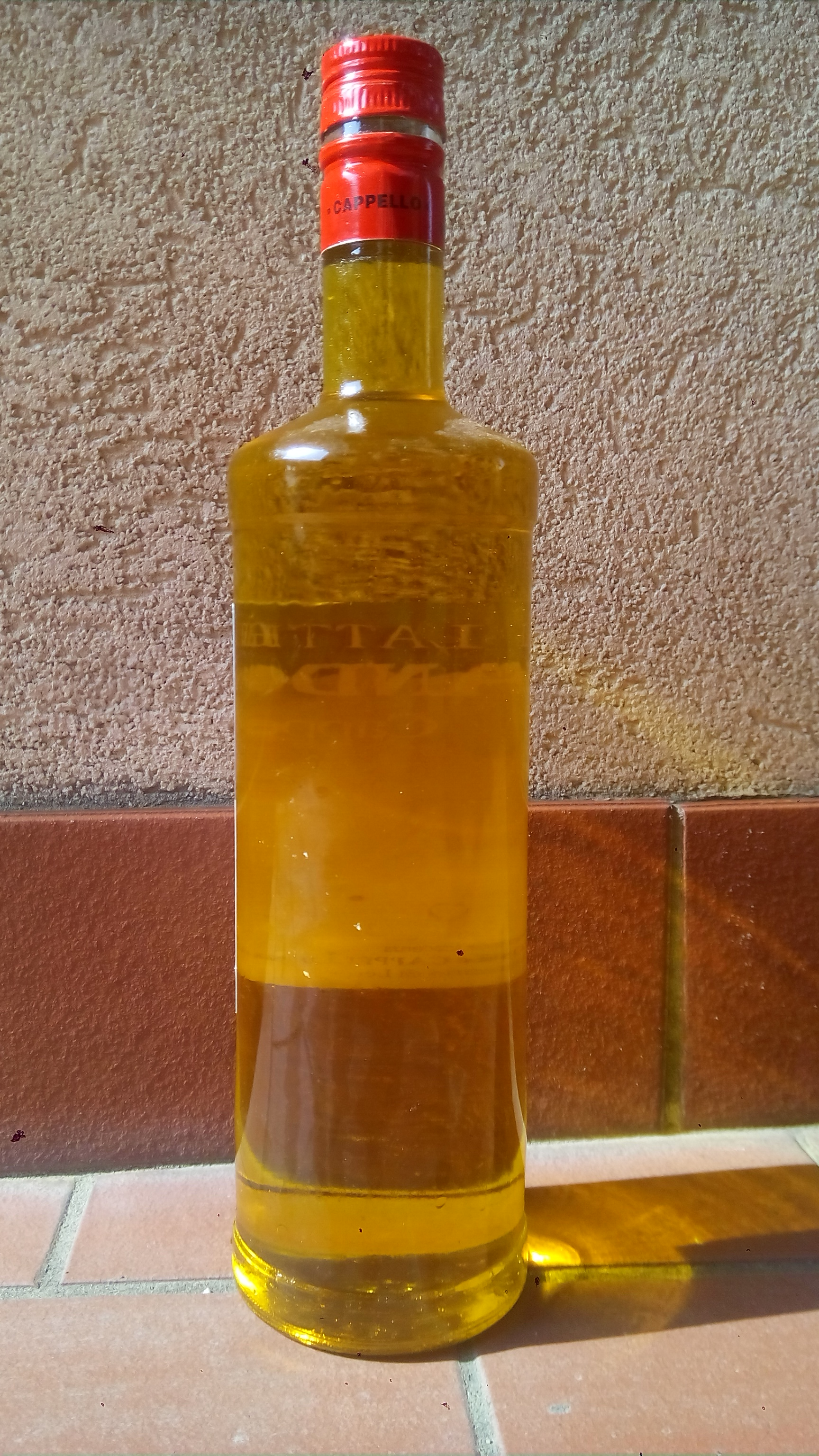

Terra d'Otranto is an extra-virgin olive oil produced primarily with the olive cultivars Cellina di Nardò and Ogliarola which is recognised as a PDO product. Its name is linked with the historical region of Terra d'Otranto which included almost all the municipalities of the current provinces of Taranto, Brindisi and Lecce.

== Origins ==
The cultivation of the olive tree in Terra d'Otranto has been introduced by the Greeks and by Phoenicians. Nevertheless, after the cessation of this activity during the Middle Ages, the Basilian monks started the first booming market of olive oil of this territory.

== Geography ==
The extra-virgin olive oil Terra d'Otranto is produced in the area between the Ionian and the Adriatic Sea, between the Murge in the province of Taranto and the Serre next to Lecce. This territory includes all the cities and villages of the province of Lecce, in the eastern part of the province of Taranto and in the municipalities of Brindisi, Cellino San Marco, Erchie, Francavilla Fontana, Latiano, Mesagne, Oria, San Donaci, San Pancrazio Salentino, San Pietro Vernotico, Torchiarolo and Torre Santa Susanna in the northern part of Salento. The limit of the altitudinal range is 517 m. above sea level. The soil is mainly made of limestone.

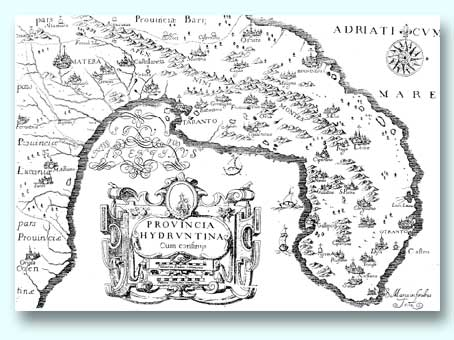
Terra d'Otranto

== Characteristics ==
The extra-virgin olive oil Terra d'Otranto is light yellow with green shades. It has a fruity taste with some light bitter and spicy aroma. It is perfect for pasta, vegetables and legumes, but it can be used also with secondo courses.

== Consortium ==
Member producers are organized in the Consorzio tutela olio DOP Terra d'Otranto, Lecce.

== See also ==
- Terra d'Otranto
- Olive oil
- Salento
- Apulia
- Terre Tarentine
