= Salento =

Peninsula that forms the "heel" of Italy

Coordinates: 40°20′00″N 18°00′00″E

Salento Salentu (Salentino) Σαλέντο (Salento Griko)
- historical and geographic region
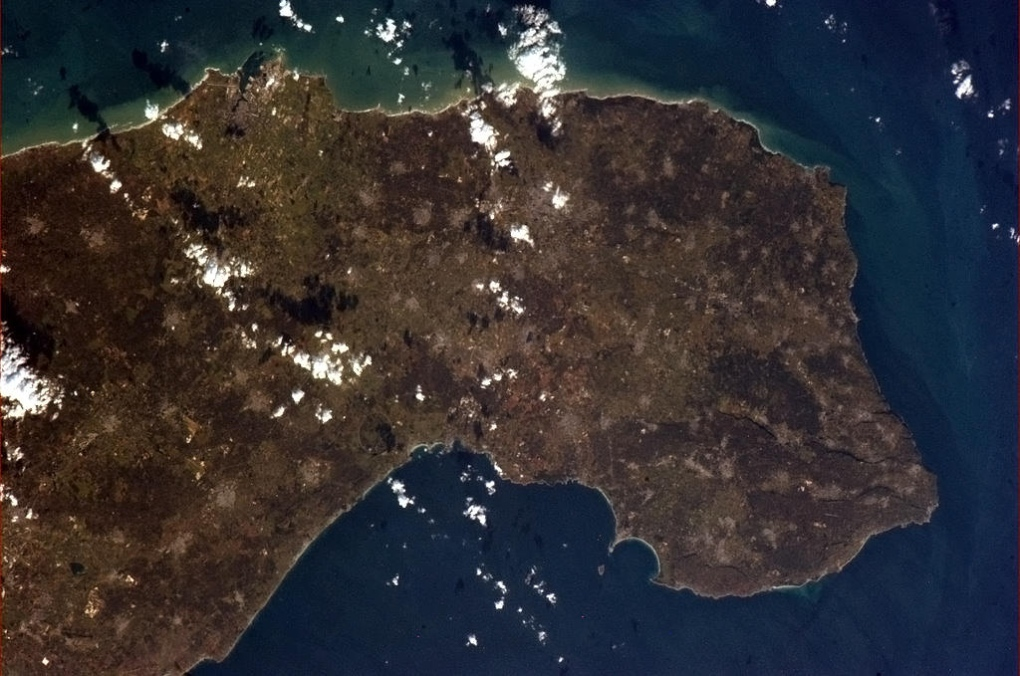
- A view of Salento from satellite

- Geographical borders of Salento (the so called "Messapic threshold")
- Country: Italy
- Regions: Apulia
- Provinces: Taranto, Brindisi, Lecce

Area
  - Land: 5,856.57 km^{2} (2,261.23 sq mi)

Population
  - Estimate (2017): 1,785,500
- Demonym: Salentini
- Time zone: UTC+1
  - Summer (DST): UTC+2
- Postal codes: 73001-73100, 72012-72015, 72017-72018, 72020-72027, 72029, 74100

Salento (Italian: [saˈlɛnto]; Salentino: Salentu; Salento Griko: Σαλέντο) is a cultural, historical, and geographic region at the southern end of the administrative region of Apulia, in southern Italy. It is a sub-peninsula of the Italian Peninsula, sometimes described as the "heel" of the Italian "boot". It encompasses the entire administrative area of the Province of Lecce, most of the Province of Brindisi (all of it except Fasano, Ostuni and Cisternino), and the south-eastern part of the Province of Taranto (like Grottaglie and Avetrana, but not Taranto itself).

== Etymology ==
In ancient times the peninsula was named Sallentina, or Messapia. To this peninsula the term Calabria was originally applied during the ancient Roman and early Byzantine era, but since 580 the administrative scope of Calabrian province was gradually expanded towards western regions, encompassing ancient Bruttium, and thus by the 10th century the term Calabria was shifted to that region, known since then as modern Calabria.

== History ==
Ancient Roman region, and later province Regio II Apulia et Calabria, encompassing modern Apulia, with Salento (known then as Calabria)

In the eleventh century BC, Iapygians migrated to Apulia from the Illyrian coast, to what was Messapia (Greek: Μεσσαπία) which was the ancient name of a region of Italy largely corresponding to modern Salento. Following the migration, the Greeks arrived in Messapia from Sparta, and giving Salento the name Magna Grecia.

In the fourth century BC, the Roman Empire built the Appian Way or Via Appia, connecting the capital Rome to Apulia. The Romans expelled the Greeks and took control of the region in 272 BC. Under Roman rule, the region of Salento was known as Calabria, and it developed a flourishing agricultural economy growing wheat, and producing olive oil. Around 7 BC, emperor Augustus divided Roman Italy into regions, one of them being Regio II Apulia et Calabria. Emperor Diocletian (284-305) reorganized Italian regions into provinces, and the newly created province of Apulia and Calabria was placed under the jurisdiction of the Diocese of Suburbicarian Italy. The Roman Empire collapsed in 476 AD, but the province continued to function under the Ostrogothic rule.

=== Byzantine and medieval era to 1480 ===
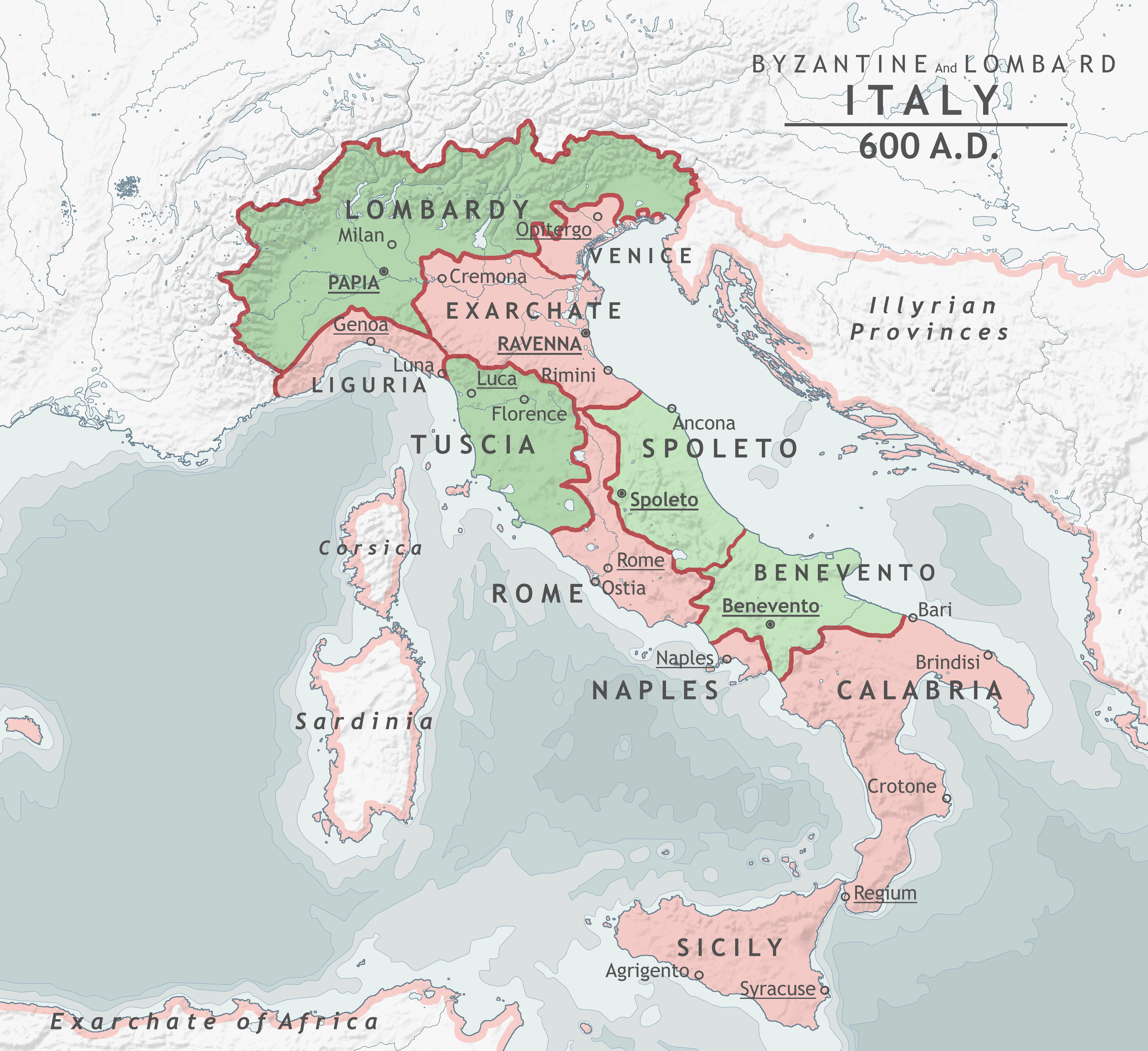
Byzantine and Lombard possessions in Italy, around 600

Byzantine Emperor Justinian I (527-565) launched the re-conquest of Italy, thus initiating the Gothic War (535–554), that ended with Byzantine victory. Under imperial rule, the Praetorian prefecture of Italy included the province of Apulia and Calabria (modern Apulia with Salento). During the Byzantine era, Greek influence was strengthened in Salento, as attested by the use of Greek language, and the Byzantine rite, followed by other cultural and artistic influences. Greek is still spoken in parts of Salento as Salentino Griko.

Since 569, the invading Lombards tried to conquer the region, but were pushed back by the Byzantines. Responding to those threats, remaining Byzantine territories in Italy were regrouped into several regions, or eparchies in 580, one of them being Calabria, that was encompassing not only ancient Roman Calabria (Salento), but also Lucania and Bruttium, thus laying foundation for the expansion of the term. Already by 584, the entire Italian Prefecture was reorganized into the Exarchate of Ravenna, that was encompassing the enlarged Calabria, but in time much of southern Italy fell under the rule of Lombard Duchy of Benevento.

Salento within the Byzantine theme (province) of Langobardia, around 1000

The Saracens occupied Bari, Ugento, and Taranto in 847 AD, but the Byzantines still remained in the un-occupied regions of Salento. Following this occupation, the Saracens in 870 AD destroyed Ugento, and deported all the inhabitants of Ugento to Africa, which after the destruction of Ugento, Taranto was also destroyed by the Saracens. Byzantines succeeded in recapturing Bari, and also much of Apulia from the Lombards, and thus by the 10th century created a new theme (province) of Langobardia, that was encompassing Apulia with Salento, while the theme of Calabria was encompassing ancient Bruttium, and thus from that time the term Calabria gained its modern meaning, detached from Salento.

In 1016, the Normans arrived in Southern Italy, landing in Salerno. Apulia became governed in 1059 by the Norman Robert Guiscard, Duke of Apulia and Calabria, and this was the beginning of a period of prosperity for the region of Salento. Apulia became a part of the Holy Roman Empire under Henri VI von Hohenstaufen, followed by his son, the Holy Roman Emperor, Frederick II. Between 1266-1442, the French Angevins came to power and Apulia became part of the Kingdom of Naples, taken from the Kingdom of Sicily. Following the merger with Naples, the Kingdom of Naples became a part of the Crown of Aragon until 1458.

=== 1480-1815 ===
In 1480, the Ottomans under Gedik Ahmed Pasha lay siege to and ransacked Otranto. Hundreds to almost a thousand men were slaughtered over the age of 15 by the Ottomans when they refused to convert to Islam, causing them to be beheaded. Neighboring towns to Otranto were fortified in an attempt to protect themselves from the Ottomans and further onslaughts. During this period, between the years of 1482 and 1484, the Venetians briefly gained control of Salento. In 1534, Emperor Charles V realises the strategic importance of Salento as a base to fight against the Turks. Charles V restores several castles, among them the castle of Lecce.

In 1713, Austria was granted Salento in the Treaty of Utrecht, although the Venetians and Ottoman Turks continued to attack the region. Following Austria being granted access, in 1734, the Battle of Bitonto, Spain defeated Austria and took control of Apulia once more. In 1806, the abolition of feudal society within the Kingdom of Naples under the French, near the start of the Napoleonic Kingdom of Naples.

=== Risorgimento to 1900s ===
Following the abolition of feudal society in 1816, the Kingdom of Naples and the Kingdom of Sicily went through a state merger, becoming the Kingdom of the Two Sicilies.

In 1861, during the Risorgimento, Apulia joined the new Kingdom of Italy, after which the Catholic Church was forced to sell the majority of its land by the Kingdom.

=== Modern history ===
In 1922, under Mussolini the production of grain, olives and wine was increased in Apulia to try to make Italy a self-sufficient nation. In 1939, the Second World War had started, and German troops were placed in Salento and Italy. In 1943 in the ongoing the Second World War, Italy joined the Axis powers, causing the ports of Bari, Brindisi and Taranto to suffer heavy bombing as Allied troops attempted to remove German forces from Apulia.

== Geography ==
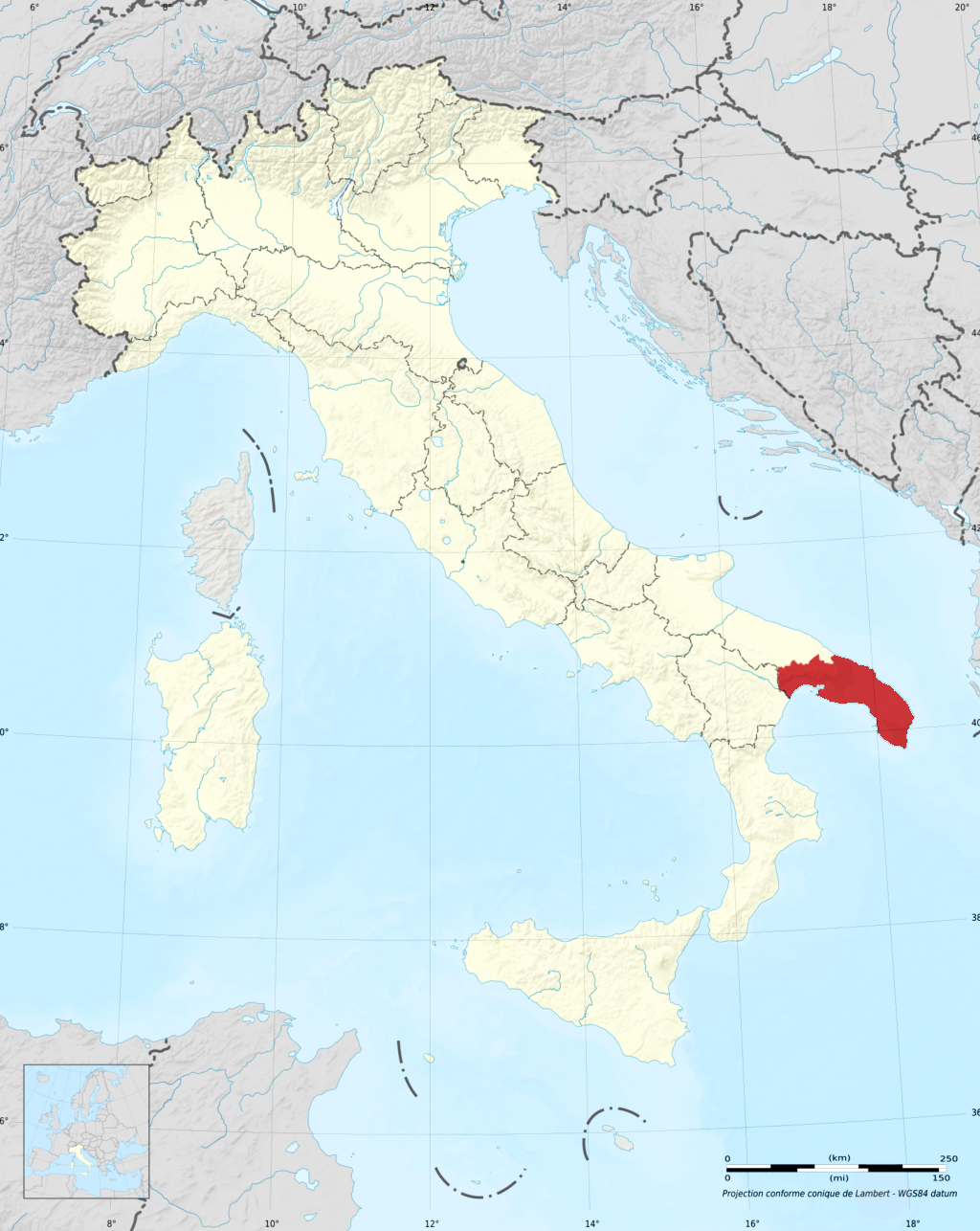
Locator map of Salento, displayed in red.

The Salento peninsula is composed of limestone, dividing the Gulf of Taranto to the west from the Strait of Otranto on the east, with the Adriatic Sea to the north and the Ionian Sea to the south. Known also as "peninsula salentina", from a geo-morphologic point of view it encompasses the land borders between Ionian and the Adriatic Seas, to the "Messapic threshold", a depression that runs along the Taranto-Ostuni line and separates it from the Murge.

The climate is typically Mediterranean with hot, dry summers and mild, rainy winters which provides suitable conditions for the cultivation of olives, citrus fruits and palm trees. The generally flat topography and surrounding seas can make Salento prone to windy weather year round.

Winters are mild and rainy with temperatures generally hovering in the teens °C during the day. Occasional bora winds from the northeast can bring colder temperatures to the east of the Italian Peninsula. Snowfall has been recorded as recently as 2017 but is generally very rare in coastal Salento. In contrast, southerly sirocco winds can bring warm temperatures of 20°C+ even during the midwinter months.

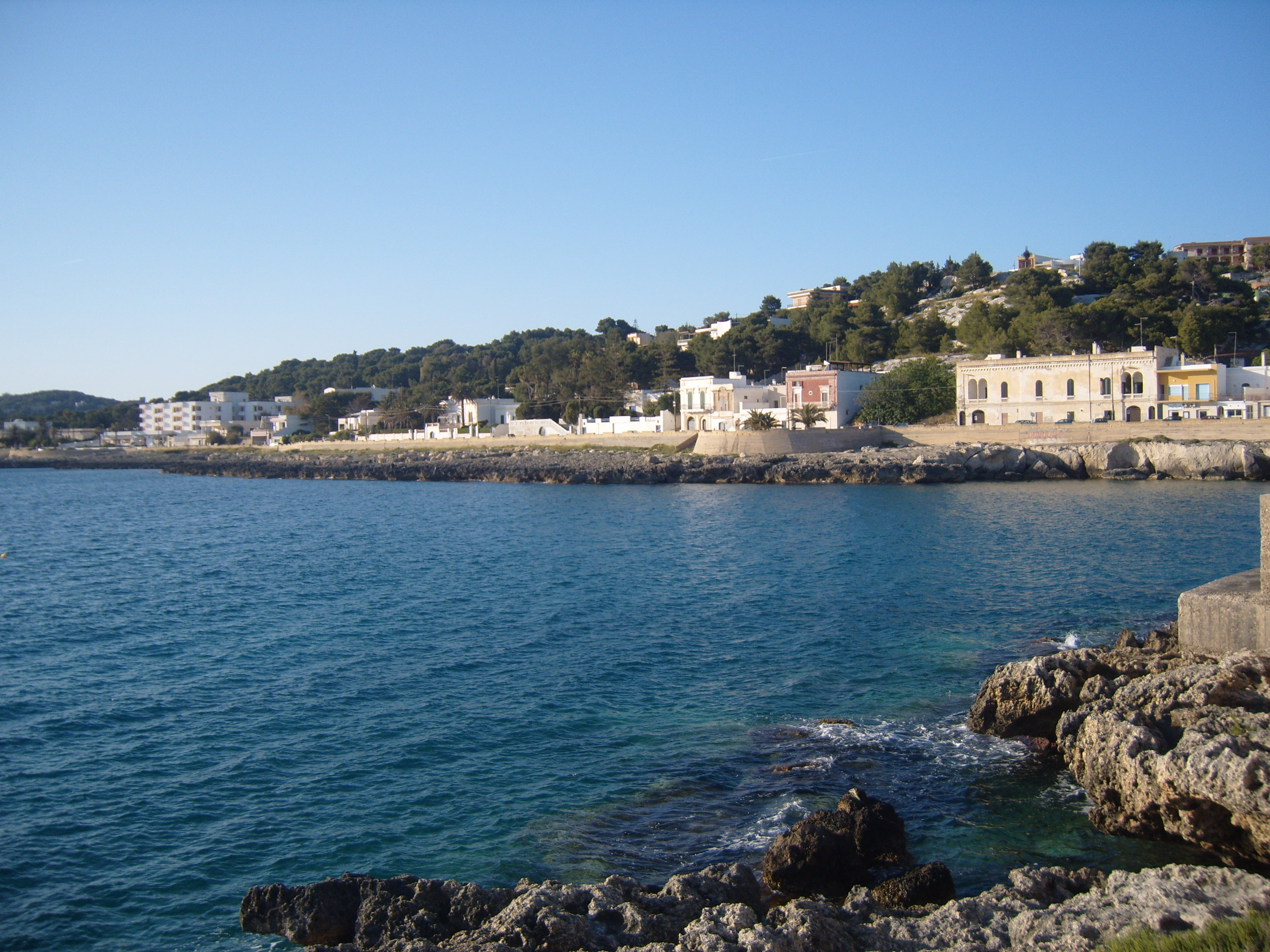
Santa Maria al Bagno seaside

Alongside much of southern Italy, summers are hot, dry and sunny. While the seas which surround Salento moderate it from the extreme heat seen in Foggia and Basilicata, summer temperatures are still high with temperatures occasionally reaching 40°C or higher during heatwaves. Sirocco winds from the south occasionally deposit dust and sand from the Sahara in the coastal towns of Salento during such heatwaves. Humidity levels can be high and summer thunderstorms are not unknown.

Its borders are:

- Taranto, in the Province of Taranto
- Pilone, in the territory of Ostuni, in the Province of Brindisi
- Santa Maria di Leuca, in the Province of Lecce.

=== Cities and towns in Salento ===
Provinces	Comunes
Lecce	Acquarica del Capo, Alessano, Alezio, Alliste, Andrano, Aradeo, Arnesano, Bagnolo del Salento, Botrugno, Calimera, Campi Salentina, Cannole, Caprarica di Lecce, Carmiano, Carpignano Salentino, Casarano, Castri di Lecce, Castrignano de' Greci, Castrignano del Capo, Castro, Cavallino, Collepasso, Copertino, Corigliano d'Otranto, Corsano, Cursi, Cutrofiano, Diso, Gagliano del Capo, Galatina, Galatone, Gallipoli, Giuggianello, Giurdignano, Guagnano, Lecce, Lequile, Leverano, Lizzanello, Maglie, Martano, Martignano, Matino, Melendugno, Melissano, Melpignano, Miggiano, Minervino di Lecce, Monteroni di Lecce, Montesano Salentino, Morciano di Leuca, Muro Leccese, Nardò, Neviano, Nociglia, Novoli, Ortelle, Otranto, Palmariggi, Parabita, Patù, Poggiardo, Porto Cesareo, Presicce, Racale, Ruffano, Salice Salentino, Salve, San Cassiano, San Cesario di Lecce, San Donato di Lecce, San Pietro in Lama, Sanarica, Sannicola, Santa Cesarea Terme, Scorrano, Seclì, Sogliano Cavour, Soleto, Specchia, Spongano, Squinzano, Sternatia, Supersano, Surano, Surbo, Taurisano, Taviano, Tiggiano, Trepuzzi, Tricase, Tuglie, Ugento, Uggiano la Chiesa, Veglie, Vernole, Zollino.
Brindisi	Brindisi, Carovigno, Cellino San Marco, Erchie, Francavilla Fontana, Latiano, Mesagne, Oria, Ostuni, San Donaci, San Michele Salentino, San Pancrazio Salentino, San Pietro Vernotico, San Vito dei Normanni, Torchiarolo, Torre Santa Susanna, Villa Castelli.
Taranto	Avetrana, Carosino, Faggiano, Fragagnano, Grottaglie, Leporano, Lizzano, Manduria, Maruggio, Monteiasi, Monteparano, Pulsano, Roccaforzata, San Giorgio Ionico, San Marzano di San Giuseppe, Sava, Taranto, Torricella.

== Culture ==
=== Language ===
In Salentino, the Salentino dialect of Extreme Southern Italian is predominantly spoken, although an old Hellenic dialect (known as Griko) is also spoken in a few inland towns.

=== Food and gastronomy ===
Some of the popular dishes from the Salento area include:

- Orecchiette, 'ear-shaped' pasta, often cooked with tomato sauce and a strong creamy cheese called ricotta schianta, or with rapini
- Parmigiana di melanzane, made with aubergines, tomato sauce and cheese like mozzarella and Parmigiano Reggiano cheese.
- Pitta di patate, a savoury pie made with mashed potatoes.
- Turcinieddhri, also known as gnummareddi, grilled lamb offal.
- Purciaddruzzi, fried hand-made small cookies with honey, eaten at Christmastime.

== Transportation ==
The nearest international airports are those of Brindisi and Bari (the latter is out of Salento but not far).

A 2-lane freeway connects Salento to Bari. The main railway line ends at Lecce. Other locations are served by regional railroads.

Leisure ports are those of: Taranto, Brindisi, Campomarino di Maruggio's tourist and leisure Marina, Gallipoli, Santa Maria di Leuca, Otranto.

== Tourism ==
In the province of Lecce, the Ciolo cave is one of the main tourist destinations.

=== Festivals ===
Salento's sagre food festivals show off local cuisine, cooking traditions and local culture. These communal feasts provide an introduction to Salento's cuisine.

Salento is a major holiday destination for the Italian gay population, developing around the southern town of Gallipoli, the lidos at Baia Verde and nearby naturist beaches. Salento Pride is celebrated annually.

=== Coastal towers ===
The coastal towers in Salento are coastal watchtowers, as the peninsula's coast was long subject to maritime attacks by the Saracens. The first towers may have been built by Normans. The remaining historic towers are mostly from the 15th and 16th centuries. Many are now in ruins.

== See also ==
Media related to Salento at Wikimedia Commons Salento (Italy) travel guide from Wikivoyage

- Grecìa Salentina
- Salentino dialect
- Magna Grecia
- Catepanate of Italy

== Sources ==
- Cosentino, Salvatore, ed. (2021). A Companion to Byzantine Italy. Boston-Leiden: Brill.
- Kreutz, Barbara M. (1996). Before the Normans: Southern Italy in the Ninth and Tenth Centuries. Philadelphia: University of Pennsylvania Press.
- Peters, Edward; Foulke, William D., eds. (2003) [1907]. Paul the Deacon: History of the Lombards. Philadelphia: University of Pennsylvania Press.
- Wickham, Chris (1981). Early Medieval Italy: Central Power and Local Society, 400-1000. Totowa, NJ: Barnes & Noble.
