= Strada statale 7 Via Appia =

State highway in Italy

State Highway 7
- Strada statale 7
- Via Appia

Route information
- Part of E90
- Maintained by ANAS
- Length: 713.45 km (443.32 mi)
- Existed: 1928–present

Major junctions
- From: Rome
- To: Brindisi

Location
- Country: Italy
- Regions: Lazio; Campania; Basilicata; Apulia

Highway system
- Roads in Italy; Autostrade; State; Regional; Provincial; Municipal

Strada statale 7 Via Appia (SS 7) is an Italian state highway. It is 713.45 kilometres (443.32 mi) long in Italy located in the regions of Lazio, Campania, Basilicata and Apulia that follows the path of the ancient Appian Way, connecting Rome to Brindisi. In the stretch between Cisterna di Latina and Terracina, the SS 7 is called "fettuccia di Terracina" ("the Terracina Ribbon") due to its straight line. It constitutes a section of the European route E90 from Taranto to Brindisi.

== History ==
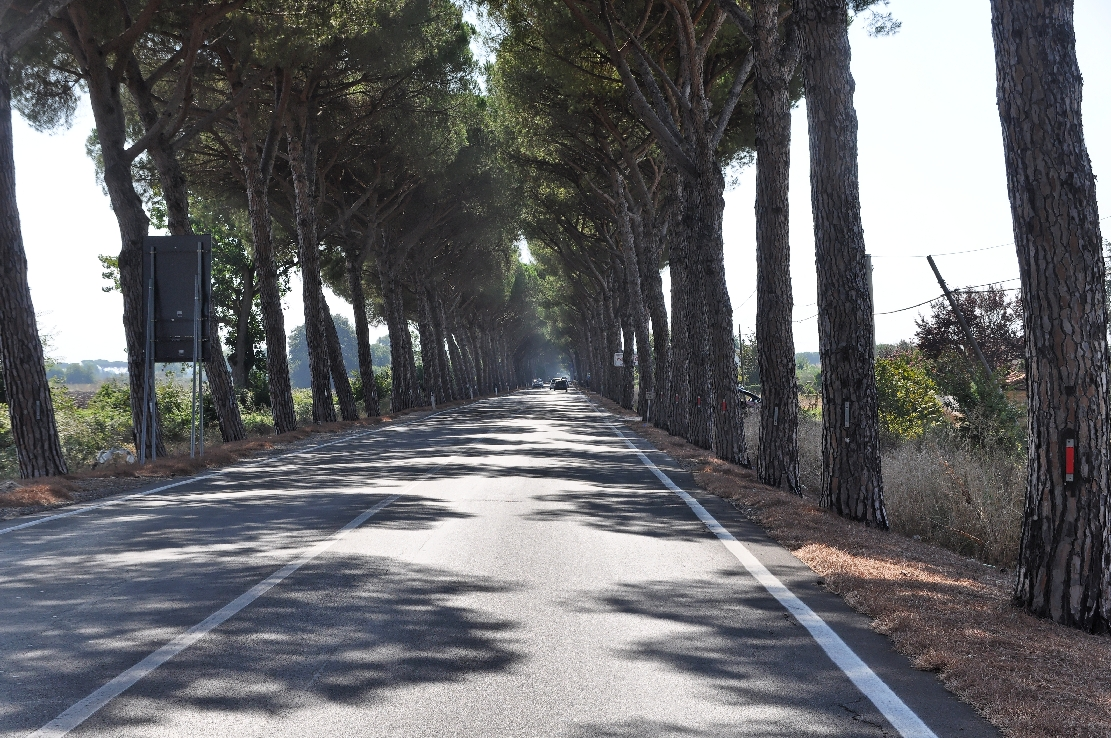
Strada statale 7 Via Appia

The modern SS 7 was established in 1928 with the following route: Rome – Velletri – Terracina - Formia–Minturno- Sessa Aurunca-Capua – Naples – Marigliano – Avellino – Atripalda – Sant'Angelo dei Lombardi Junction – Lioni – Ruoti – Potenza – Laterza – Castellaneta – Taranto – Francavilla – Brindisi.

The motorway's route was changed in 1935, abandoning the original section from Capua to Avellino passing through Naples and Marigliano in favor of a more northern route passing through Caserta and Benevento. The abandoned route was reused as the new Strada statale 7 bis di Terra di Lavoro.

In 1937 the route was changed again, abandoning the original section from Pozzo Grillo in Laterza through Ginosa in favor of a more northern route passing through Matera. The new route included a section that had previously been part of Strada statale 99 di Matera.

In 1951, the branch from Formia to Gaeta was classified as a state road.

In 1952, the branch connecting the SS 7 to the Rome-Ciampino airport was classified as a state road.

== Route ==
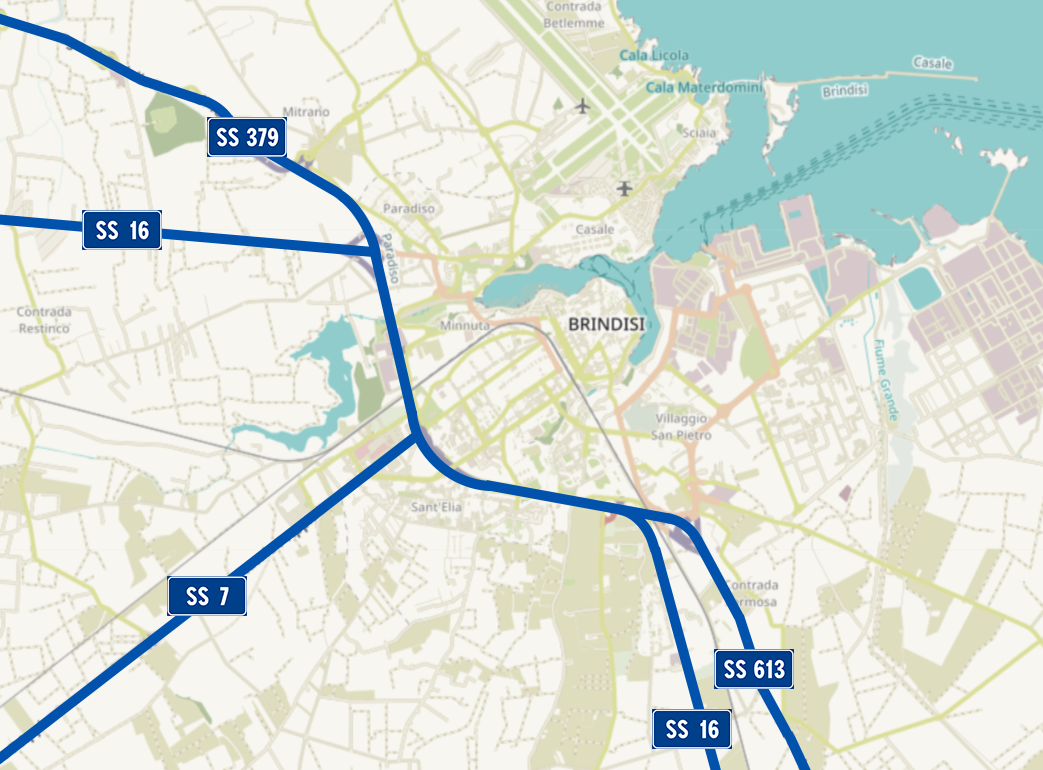
Map of State highways system in Brindisi

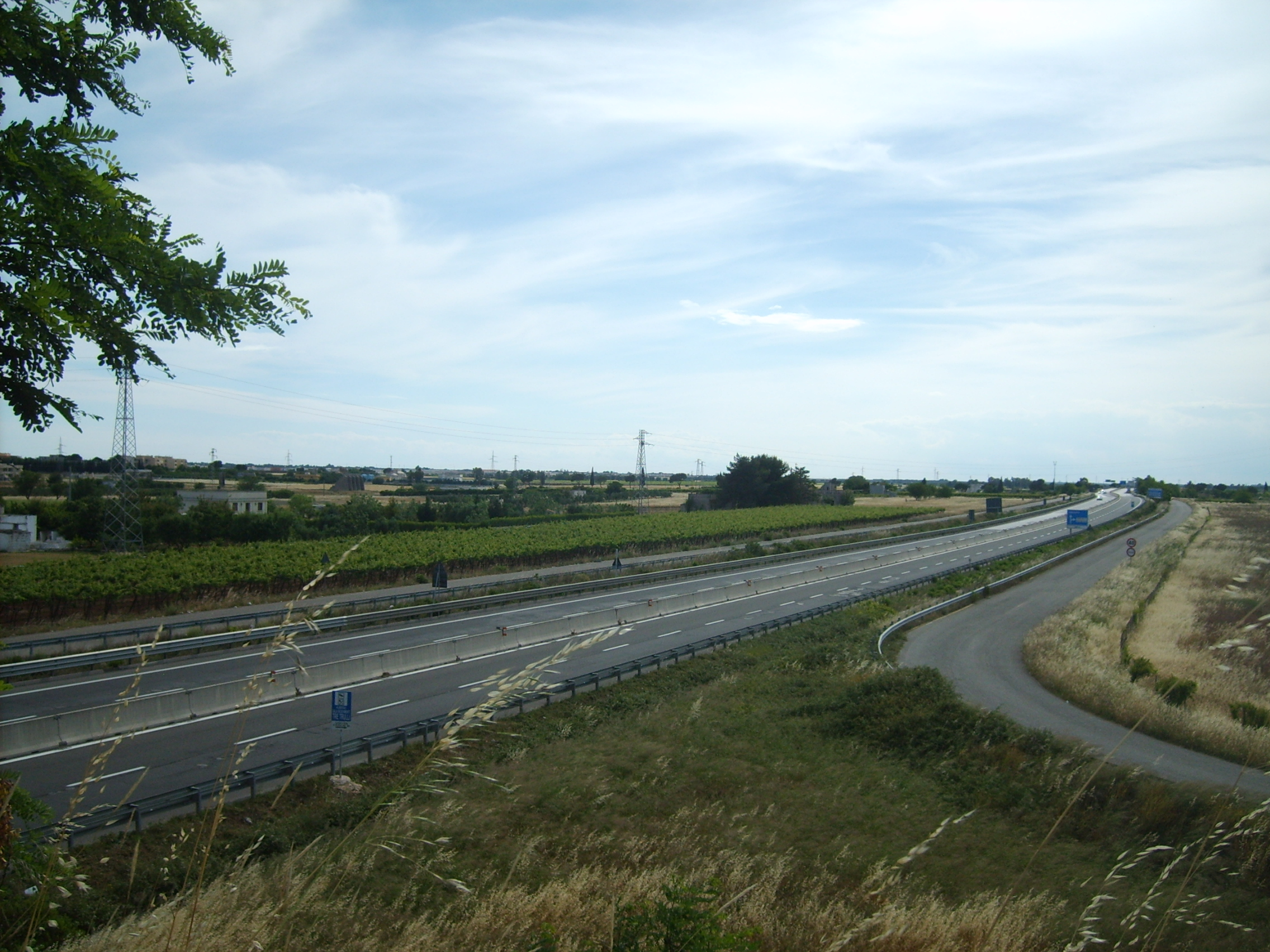
Strada statale 7 Via Appia in Francavilla Fontana

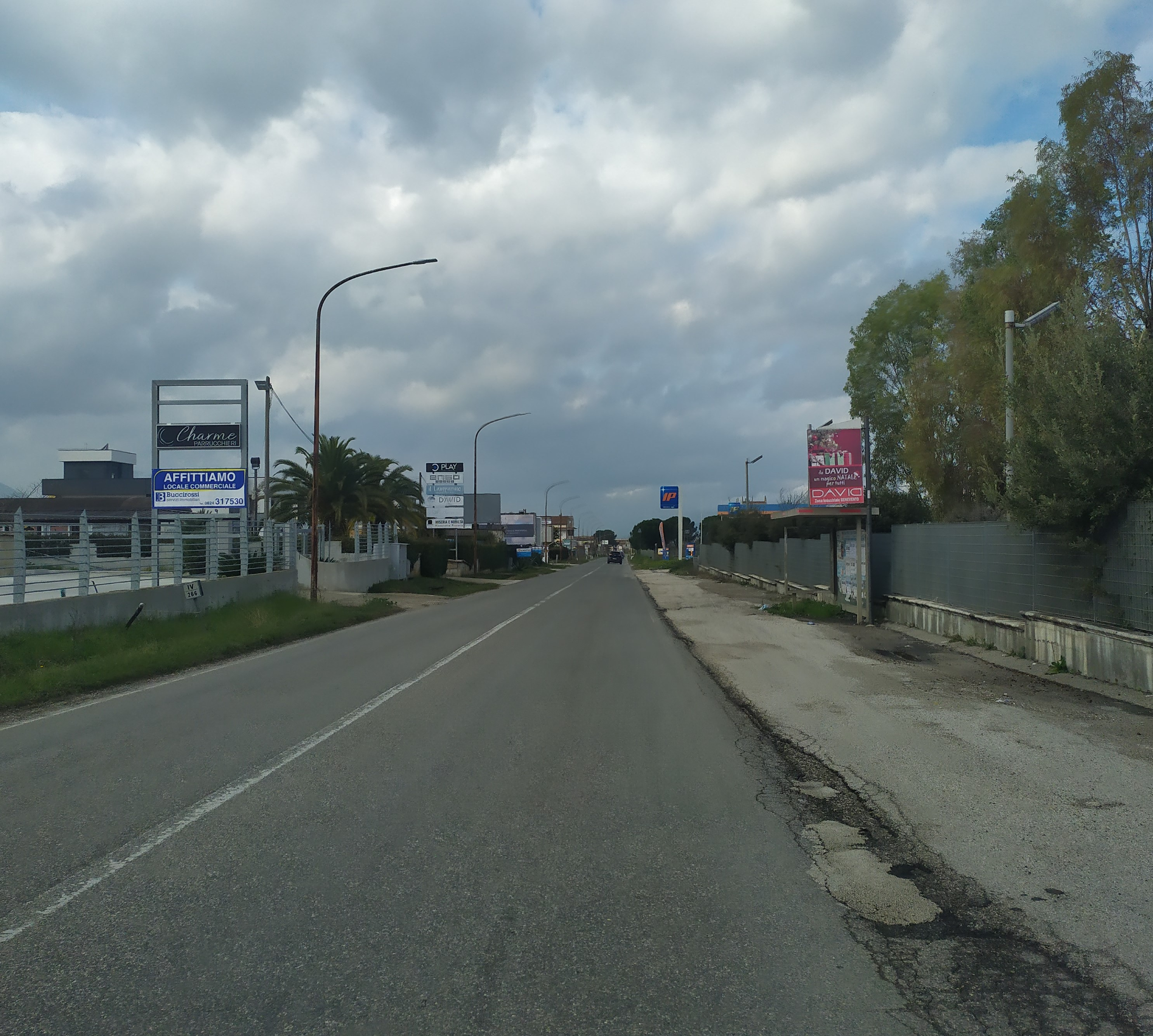
Strada statale 7 Via Appia in Benevento

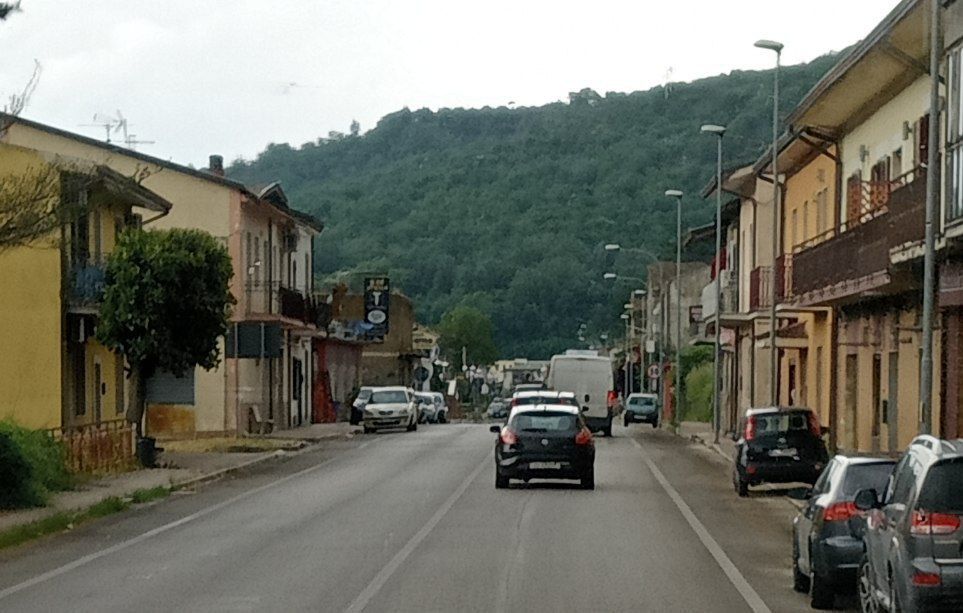
Strada statale 7 Via Appia in Tufara

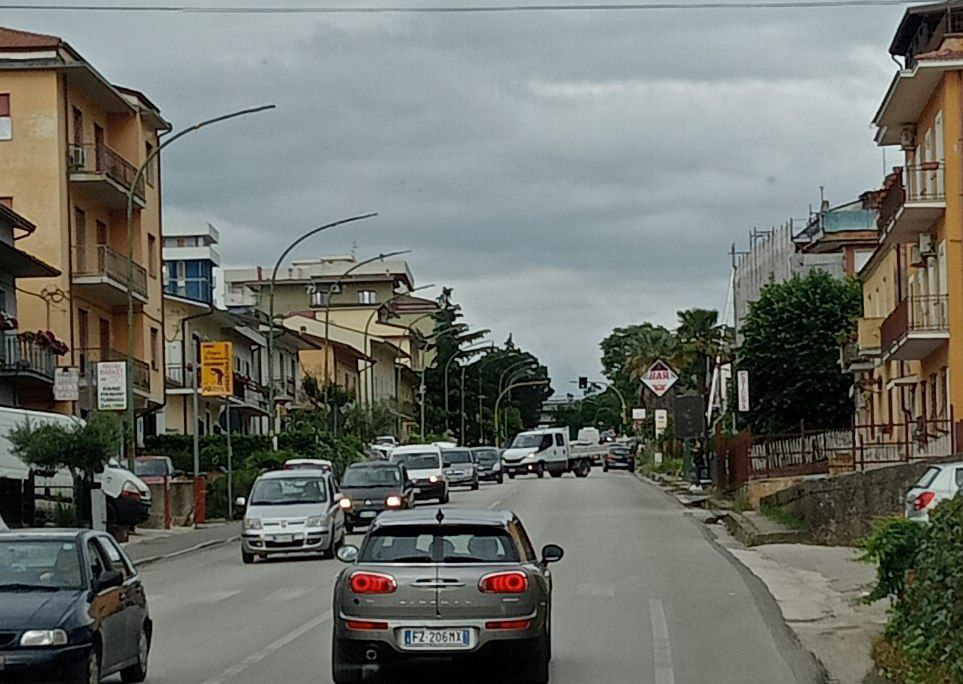
Strada statale 7 Via Appia in Benevento

=== From Rome to Velletri ===
Via Appia; Rome-Velletri section
Exit	↓km↓	Province	European route
Rome	0.0 km (0 mi)	RM	-
Grande Raccordo Anulare di Roma; Uscita	13.6 km (8.5 mi)	RM	-
ex Via Appia	15 km (9.3 mi)	RM	-
Aeroporto di Roma-Ciampino	15 km (9.3 mi)	RM	-
ex Via dei Laghi; Santa Maria delle Mole	17 km (11 mi)	RM	-
Frattocchie ex Nettunense	20 km (12 mi)	RM	-
Del Lago Albano	22 km (14 mi)	RM	-
Albano Laziale ex Maremmana III	25 km (16 mi)	RM	-
Ariccia ex Via Rocca Di Papa	26.5 km (16.5 mi)	RM	-
Genzano di Roma per Nemi	28.5 km (17.7 mi)	RM	-
Velletri-Tangenziale di Ponente	38.5 km (23.9 mi)	RM	-
ex Via Dei Laghi	39 km (24 mi)	RM	-
Velletri Ariana	39.2 km (24.4 mi)	RM	-

=== From Velletri to Terracina ===
Via Appia; Velletri-Terracina connection
Exit	↓km↓	Province	European route
Velletri Ariana	39.2 km (24.4 mi)	RM	-
to Nettuno; Velletri-Fienili	42.7 km (26.5 mi)	RM	-
Variante di Cisterna di Latina	49.5 km (30.8 mi)	LT	-
Cisterna di Latina	52.2 km (32.4 mi)	LT	-
Variante di Cisterna di Latina	54.7 km (34.0 mi)	LT	-
per Chiesuola, Latina Scalo	63.4 km (39.4 mi)	LT	-
to Latina, Latina Scalo	65,4	LT	-
Tor Tre Ponti	66.6 km (41.4 mi)	LT	-
Borgo Faiti	72.4 km (45.0 mi)	LT	-
dei Monti Lepini	73.4 km (45.6 mi)	LT	-
to Pontinia	79.0 km (49.1 mi)	LT	-
to Priverno to Sabaudia	86.8 km (53.9 mi)	LT	-
dell'Abbazia di Fossanova	95.1 km (59.1 mi)	LT	-
di Porto Badino; Terracina	99.5 km (61.8 mi)	LT	-

=== From Potenza to Matera ===
Via Appia; Potenza-Matera section
Exit	↓km↓	Province	European route
Variante di Potenza	468.3 km (291.0 mi)	PZ	-
Bivio di Tricarico Barese	481.7 km (299.3 mi)	PZ	-
Valico Tre Cancelli	499.0 km (310.1 mi)	MT/PZ	-
Tricarico	508.5 km (316.0 mi)	MT	-
di Calle	519.7 km (322.9 mi)	MT	-
	520.2 km (323.2 mi)	MT	-
Grassano	525.8 km (326.7 mi)	MT	-
Grottole	538.3 km (334.5 mi)	MT	-
Miglionico	550.9 km (342.3 mi)	MT	-
Via Appia	554.1 km (344.3 mi)	MT	-
to Pomarico	558.0 km (346.7 mi)	MT	-
to Grassano	558.5 km (347.0 mi)	MT	-
Lago di San Giuliano	560.2 km (348.1 mi)	MT	-
dei Tre Confini	562.4 km (349.5 mi)	MT	-
Torrente Gravina	564.4 km (350.7 mi)	MT	-
Matera sud Matera Hospital	569.7 km (354.0 mi)	MT	-
Matera centro 'Bradanica	570.2 km (354.3 mi)	MT	-
Matera Via La Martella - Zona PAIP 1-2	572.3 km (355.6 mi)	MT	-
Matera Via Dante - Sassi di Matera	573.4 km (356.3 mi)	MT	-
Matera Via Gravina - Tensostruttura	573.7 km (356.5 mi)	MT	-
di Matera	574.2 km (356.8 mi)	MT	-
Matera; Via Nazionale	574.2 km (356.8 mi)	MT	-

=== From Taranto to Brindisi ===
Via Appia; Taranto-Brindisi connection
Exit	↓km↓	Province	European route
del Porto di Taranto	647.4 km (402.3 mi)	TA	E90
Via Appia (direction Matera); Taranto - Croce	647.4 km (402.3 mi)	TA	E90
Taranto - Rione Tamburi; Cimitero San Brunone	647.9 km (402.6 mi)	TA	E90
Taranto - Rione Tamburi per Statte	648.9 km (403.2 mi)	TA	E90
Industrial area	649.5 km (403.6 mi)	TA	E90
Taranto - Rione Tamburi dei Trulli	649.9 km (403.8 mi)	TA	E90
Taranto centro Salentina	652.1 km (405.2 mi)	TA	E90
Taranto - Paolo VI; Circummarpiccolo	654.7 km (406.8 mi)	TA	E90
to Monteiasi, Montemesola	661.2 km (410.9 mi)	TA	E90
Grottaglie; Taranto-Grottaglie Airport ex to San Giorgio Jonico	666.3 km (414.0 mi)	TA	E90
Grottaglie; Strada comunale Paparazio	668.5 km (415.4 mi)	TA	E90
Grottaglie centro	669.9 km (416.3 mi)	TA	E90
Villa Castelli	673.3 km (418.4 mi)	BR	E90
Francavilla Fontana	675.7 km (419.9 mi)	BR	E90
Industrial area	676.3 km (420.2 mi)	BR	E90
to Villa Castelli	677.3 km (420.9 mi)	BR	E90
Francavilla Fontana ovest to Villa Castelli	678.7 km (421.7 mi)	BR	E90
Francavilla Fontana nord to Ceglie Messapica	680.3 km (422.7 mi)	BR	E90
Francavilla Fontana centro to Ostuni to San Michele Salentino	681.7 km (423.6 mi)	BR	E90
Francavilla Fontana est ex di San Giorgio Jonico	684.7 km (425.5 mi)	BR	E90
Oria	687.7 km (427.3 mi)	BR	E90
Latiano	691.8 km (429.9 mi)	BR	E90
Artisan area	693.1 km (430.7 mi)	BR	E90
Latiano to San Vito dei Normanni to San Michele Salentino	693.7 km (431.0 mi)	BR	E90
Latiano est	694.5 km (431.5 mi)	BR	E90
Latiano est	695.5 km (432.2 mi)	BR	E90
Mesagne ovest	699.5 km (434.6 mi)	BR	E90
Mesagne ex di Mesagne	700.5 km (435.3 mi)	BR	E90
Mesagne centro	701.9 km (436.1 mi)	BR	E90
Mesagne est	702.4 km (436.5 mi)	BR	E90
Mesagne Industrial area	703.9 km (437.4 mi)	BR	E90
San Donaci; University of Salento	706.6 km (439.1 mi)	BR	E90
Restinco	709.1 km (440.6 mi)	BR	E90
Shopping center	711.6 km (442.2 mi)	BR	E90
Brindisi - Sant'Elia	712.4 km (442.7 mi)	BR	E90
Brindisi Hospital	713.2 km (443.2 mi)	BR	E90
Adriatica; Tangenziale di Brindisi	713.3 km (443.2 mi)	BR	E90
Brindisi	713.5 km (443.3 mi)	BR	

== See also ==
- State highways (Italy)
- Roads in Italy
- Transport in Italy

=== Other Italian roads ===
- Autostrade of Italy
- Regional road (Italy)
- Provincial road (Italy)
- Municipal road (Italy)
