= Guagnano =

- Comune
- Comune di Guagnano
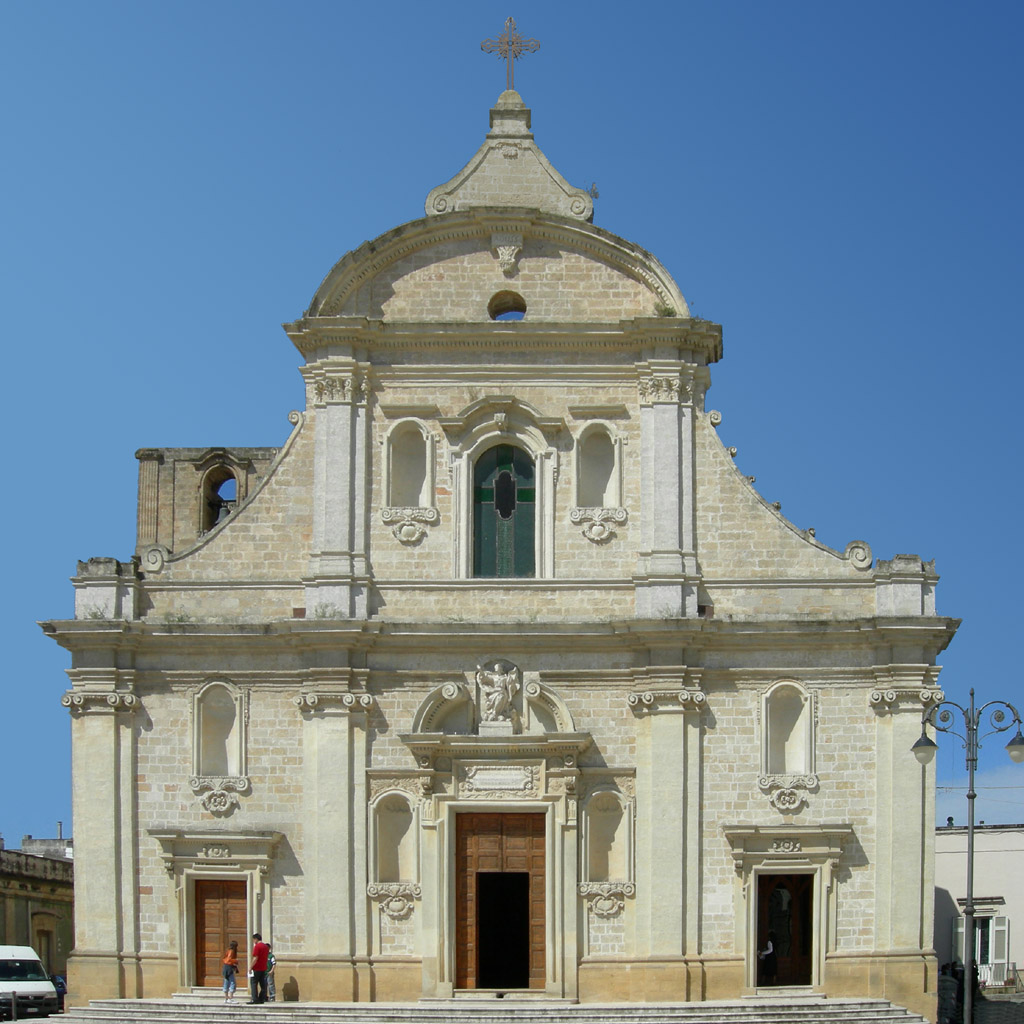
- Mother Church of Guagnano

- Coat of arms

- Location of Guagnano in Italy Guagnano (Apulia)
- Coordinates: 40°24′N 17°57′E
- Country: Italy
- Region: Apulia
- Province: Lecce (LE)
- Frazioni: Villa Baldassarri

Government
  - Mayor: Francois Imperiale

Area
  - Total: 38.03 km^{2} (14.68 sq mi)
- Elevation: 44 m (144 ft)

Population (31 August 2017)
  - Total: 5,699
  - Density: 149.9/km^{2} (388.1/sq mi)
- Demonym: Guagnanesi
- Time zone: UTC+1 (CET)
  - Summer (DST): UTC+2 (CEST)
- Postal code: 73010
- Dialing code: 0832
- ISTAT code: 075034
- Patron saint: Madonna of the Rosary
- Saint day: 7 October
- Website: Official website

eeGuagnano (Salentino: Uagnanu) is a town and comune in the province of Lecce, Apulia, south-eastern Italy. Situated in northern Salento, it also includes the fraction of Villa Baldassarri.

== History ==
Guagnano was originally part of a group of villages, and at the end of the 13th century the region belonged to the feud of the count of Lecce. It became the possession of the Orsini del Balzo, princes of Taranto, then passed into the hands of Baron Matteo de Admiaris, before becoming the possession of a series of families (the Sambiasi, the Zurlo, the Paladini, the Galateo, the Lopez, the Santoro and the Mattehei, the Albrigi, then finally the Filomarini, Dukes of Cutrofiano). In 1811 a large village, Villa Baldassarri, was added to the principality of Guagnano and remains part of it today.

=== Origin of name ===
The etymologia of Guagnano possibly derives from a word referring to marshes that are rich in water. It could also derive from a Latin name of an unidentified person, maybe Covanius or Aequanius, with the suffix "-ano" added to indicate possession of a property. According to historian Giacomo Arditi, however, the name comes from the word guadagno which refers to the fertility of the land and the meadows and to lucrative activities of the region.

== Geography ==
=== Territory ===
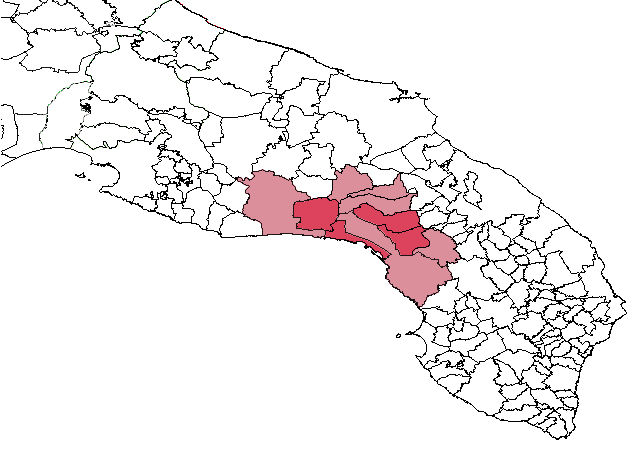
Terra d'Arneo

The territory of Guagnano, 24 km northwest of Lecce and bordering on the Province of Brindisi, sits 44 m above sea level and covers 37 km². The western part of the territory falls in the zone of the Terra d'Arneo, the area of Salento on the Ionian coast between San Pietro in Bevagna and Torre dell'Inserraglio. Guagnano is bordered by: San Donaci and Cellino San Marco to the north, Campi Salentina to the east, Salice Salentino to the south, and San Pancrazio Salentino to the west.

=== Climate ===
Guagnano has a Mediterranean climate with mild winters and hot humid summers. The average temperature in January, its coldest month, is 9 °C, while in its hottest month, August, the average temperature is 24.7 °C. Yearly average precipitation, which is frequent in autumn and winter, reaches 626 mm. Spring and summer are characterized by long periods of drought. Eastern Salento is subject to cold winds from the Balkans and hot winds from North Africa.

Climate data for Guagnano
Month	Jan	Feb	Mar	Apr	May	Jun	Jul	Aug	Sep	Oct	Nov	Dec	Year
Mean daily maximum °F	54.7	55.8	59.0	64.9	72.7	80.2	84.6	85.3	79.2	71.2	63.7	57.6	69.1
Mean daily minimum °F	42.1	42.4	45.0	49.1	55.6	62.6	67.1	67.8	63.1	56.7	49.8	44.8	53.8
Average precipitation inches	2.8	2.4	2.6	1.6	1.3	0.8	0.6	0.9	1.9	3.1	3.8	2.9	24.7
Mean daily maximum °C	12.6	13.2	15.0	18.3	22.6	26.8	29.2	29.6	26.2	21.8	17.6	14.2	20.6
Mean daily minimum °C	5.6	5.8	7.2	9.5	13.1	17.0	19.5	19.9	17.3	13.7	9.9	7.1	12.1
Average precipitation mm	71	60	65	40	33	20	16	22	49	80	97	74	627
Average relative humidity (%)	78.7	78.2	77.8	77.3	76.2	72.9	70.9	72.4	76.5	79.2	80.5	80.3	76.7

== Main sights ==
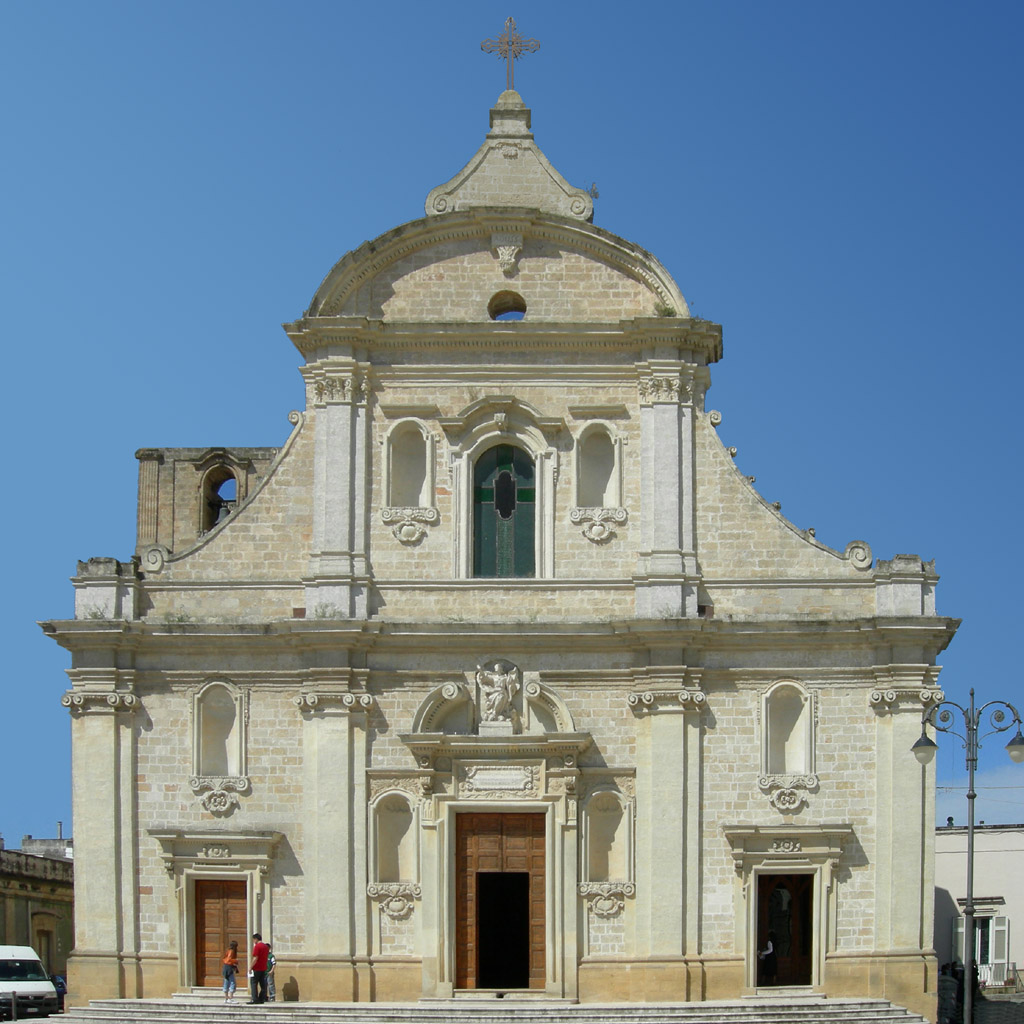
Chiesa Madre

=== Chiesa Madre ===
Construction on the Chiesa Madre (Mother Church), dedicated to the Madonna Assunta, began in the 18th century. It was built over a 15th-century structure made on the spot where an image of Our Lady of the Rosary was found.

It has a large Baroque facade divided into two orders, characterized by an entrance above which is located a sculpture of the Assumption, and flanked by two smaller doors with refined decoration. The interior, with the shape of a Latin cross with three naves, is decorated with opulent gold-plated stucco. The naves, with starred ceilings, house several Baroque altars dedicated to: the Crucifixion; St Francis Xavier; St Oronzo; the Madonna del Carmine; Sts Cosmas and Damian; St Francis of Assisi; and St Joseph. In the right transept is an important altar dedicated to the Madonna of the Rosary containing an image of the Virgin from the 14th century. The Renaissance baptistery is recently restored.

=== Church of the Madonna of the Rosario ===
The church of the Madonna of the Rosario, was constructed in the middle of the 18th century. It contains relics of the four martyrs; of particular interest is the statue of the Virgin.

==== Manors ====
- Bosco Manor (19th century)
- Camarda Manor (17th century)
- Marina Manor (13th century)
- Monte Calabrese Manor (18th century)
- Nardo di Prato Fortified Manor (15th – 16th century)
- Patriglione Manor (18th century)
- Poggi Manor (19th century)
- Pucciano Manor (17th-18th century)
- San Gaetano Fortified Manor (15th-16th century)

== Language ==
The Salentino dialect is spoken in Guagnano in a variant that is much influenced by the dialect of Lecce. The Salentino dialect was influenced by the various linguistic groups that established themselves in this area including: Messapi, Greeks, Romans, Byzantines, Lombards, Normans, Albanians, French, and Spaniards.

== Culture ==
Events in the town include:

- The Feast of St Anthony the Abbot, with the traditional bonfire on the last Sunday of January
- The Feast of St Joseph (March 19)
- The festival of the grapes and wine ("dell'Uva Cardinal e del Vino") during the last ten days of July
- The "Terre del Negroamaro" Prize on the first Friday after August 15
- The Feast of the Madonna of Mount Carmel, with a traditional festival during the first ten days of September
- Feast of the Madonna of the Rosary, with a traditional market during the first ten days of October

== Economy ==
The cultivation of grapes is the most important economic activity of Guagnano. Grapes are grown for use in both table wines as well as wines for selling and export. It is at the center of the production DOC of the wine known as Salice Salentino and numerous cantinas have been established in this sector by various consortiums. Furniture making is also a significant economic factor of the area.

== Transportation ==
State road 7, stretching from Taranto to Lecce, runs through the city center of Guagnano and is its main road. The city center can also be reached by local roads SP104, SP105, SP106, and SP327.

Guagnano sits on the railway line Martina Franca-Lecce.
