= Coastal towers in Salento =

Salento, in southern Italy, is dotted with watchtowers which were constructed to sight seaborne invaders, including those coming from Turkey. Many of the towers were built in the 16th century. The towers come in a variety of designs, including a truncated cone, a truncated pyramid, a fortified masserie, a tower masserie, and a closed-courtyard Masseria. After their initial function as lookout posts for sighting seaborne threats became redundant, many of the towers were either "abandoned or used as a place to store agricultural tools". Subsidence has affected the tower structures.

This is the list in a clockwise direction from the province of Brindisi and culminating in the province of Taranto.

== Province of Brindisi ==
Image	Tower Name	City	Base Section	Build Year
	Torre Egnazia	Fasano		
	Torre Canne	Fasano		
	Torre San Leonardo	village Pilone, Ostuni		
	Torre Villanova	Ostuni		
	Torre Pozzelle	Ostuni		
	Torre Santa Sabina	Carovigno	four-pointed star	
	Torre Guaceto	Carovigno	square	
	Torre Testa	Brindisi		
	Torre Penna	Brindisi		
	Torre Cavallo	Brindisi		
	Torre Mattarelle	Brindisi		
	Torre San Gennaro	Torchiarolo		

== Province of Lecce ==
Image	Tower Name	City	Base Section	Build Year
	Torre Specchiolla	Lecce, fraz. Casalabate; 40°30′22″N 18°06′56″E	square	16th century
	Torre Rinalda	Lecce; 40°28′55″N 18°09′30″E	square	16th century
	Torre Chianca	Leccev; 40°27′34″N 18°12′51″E	square	16th century
	Torre Veneri	Lecce; 40°25′07″N 18°16′09″E		16th century
	Torre San Cataldo	Lecce		
	Torre Specchia Ruggeri	Vernole		
	Torre San Foca	Melendugno; 40°18′08″N 18°24′18″E	square	1568
	Torre Roca Vecchia	Melendugno; 40°17′18″N 18°25′40″E	square	1568
	Torre dell'Orso	Melendugno; 40°30′22″N 18°06′56″E	square	1568
	Torre Sant'Andrea	Melendugno		
	Torre Fiumicelli	Otranto; 40°13′30″N 18°27′52″E		
	Torre Santo Stefano	Otranto; 40°10′59″N 18°28′23″E	square	1567
	Torre del Serpe	Otranto; 40°08′31″N 18°30′19″E		
	Torre dell'Orte or dell'Orto	Otranto		1565
	Torre Palascia	Otranto; 40°06′27″N 18°31′12″E		
	Torre Sant'Emiliano	Otranto; 40°05′27″N 18°29′47″E	circle	16th century
	Torre Badisco	Otranto		
	Torre Minervino	Santa Cesarea Terme; 40°03′58″N 18°28′48″E	circle	
	Torre Specchia di Guardia	Santa Cesarea Terme; 40°02′41″N 18°28′14″E		
	Torre Santa Cesarea	Santa Cesarea Terme; 40°02′41″N 18°28′14″E	circle	
	Torre Miggiano	Santa Cesarea Terme; 40°01′50″N 18°27′00″E	circle	16th century
	Torre Diso	Castro; 39°59′50″N 18°25′04″E		16th century
	Torre Capo Lupo	Diso	circle	15th century
	Torre Andrano or Porto di Ripa	Andrano	circle	16th century
	Torre del Sasso	Tricase		
	Torre di Porto Tricase	Tricase		
	Torre Palane or Plane	Tricase	square	
	Torre Nasparo or Naspre or de Lissano	Tiggiano		1565
	Torre Specchia Grande	Corsano	circle	
	Torre del Ricco	Corsano; 39°52′03″N 18°23′38″E		
	Torre di Porto Novaglie	Gagliano del Capo		
	Torre Montelungo	Gagliano del Capo		
	Torre Santa Maria di Leuca	Gagliano del Capo		
	Torre dell'Omomorto or Uomini Morti	Castrignano del Capo		1555
	Torre Marchiello	Castrignano del Capo; 39°47′56″N 18°19′55″E		16th century
	Torre San Gregorio	Patu		
	Torre Vado	Morciano di Leuca	circle	16th century
	Torre Pali	Salve	circle	16th century
	Torre Fiumicelli or Torre Mozza	Ugento	circle	16th century
	Torre San Giovanni	Ugento; 39°53′10″N 18°06′50″E	octagon	1563
	Torre Sinforo or Sinfono	Alliste		16th century
	Torre Suda	Racale		16th century
	Torre del Pizzo	Gallipoli		16th century
	Torre San Giovanni la Pedata	Gallipoli		
	Torre Sabea	Gallipoli		16th century
	Torre Alto Lido	Gallipoli		1565
	Torre del Fiume di Galatena (also called delle quattro colonne)	Nardò	square	17th century
	Torre Santa Caterina	Nardò		16th century
	Torre Santa Maria dell'Alto	Nardò		1569
	Torre Uluzzo or Crustano	Nardò		16th century
	Torre dell'Inserraglio or Critò	Nardò		1568
	Torre Sant'Isidoro	Nardò	square	1565
	Torre Squillace	Nardò	square	16th century
	Torre Cesarea	Porto Cesareo; 40°15′25″N 17°53′31″E	square	1569
	Torre Chianca	Porto Cesareo; 40°16′18″N 17°52′14″E	square	16th century
	Torre Lapillo	Porto Cesareo; 40°16′51″N 17°50′25″E	square	1550
	Torre Castiglione	Porto Cesareo; 40°17′13″N 17°49′10″E		

== Province of Taranto ==
Image	Tower Name	City	Base Section	Build Year
	Torre Colimena	Manduria	square	
	Torre Saline	Manduria		
	Torre San Pietro in Bevagna	Manduria	four-pointed star	
	Torre Borraco	Manduria		
	Torre Moline	Maruggio		
	Torre Ovo	Torricella		
	Torre Canneto	Lizzano		
	Torre Zozzoli or Sgarrata	administrative island of Taranto, between Pulsano and Lizzano		
	Torre Rossa or Sasso	Taranto (destroyed)		
	Torre Castelluccia	Pulsano		
	Torre Saturo	Leporano		
	Torre Lama	Taranto		
	Torre Capo San Vito	Taranto; 40°24′45″N 17°12′11″E		
	Torre Rondinella	Taranto		
	Torre Tara	Taranto		
	Torre Saline or Lo Lato	Castellaneta		
	Torre Mattoni	Ginosa		

== See also ==
- List of lighthouses in Italy
