= Elio Ciccarese =

Italian politician (born 1965)

President of the Province of Brindisi
- Incumbent
- Assumed office 28 September 2026
- Preceded by: Angelo Pomes

Mayor of Torchiarolo
- Incumbent
- Assumed office 22 September 2020
- Preceded by: Flavio Caretto

Personal details
- Born: 28 October 1965 (age 60) Torchiarolo, Province of Brindisi, Italy

Elio Ciccarese (born 28 October 1965) is an Italian politician serving as president of the Province of Brindisi since 2026. He has also served as mayor of Torchiarolo since 2020.

== Life and career ==
Ciccarese was born in 1965 in Torchiarolo, in the province of Brindisi. He worked as a real estate agent before becoming an entrepreneur in the construction sector.

Ciccarese was elected mayor of his hometown in the 2020 municipal elections, receiving 42.4% of the vote with the civic list Svolta Insieme a Noi. He took office on 22 September 2020. He was re-elected in the 2026 municipal elections, receiving 72.78% of the vote.

Ciccarese served as vice president of the Province of Brindisi and became acting president in April 2026 following the fall of the administration headed by Angelo Pomes.

In the 2026 provincial election, held on 27 September, Ciccarese was elected president of the Province of Brindisi, supported by civic groups, the Democratic Party and the Five Star Movement. He received 49,854 weighted votes, defeating Angelo Caforio, mayor of Latiano. He was formally proclaimed president on 28 September 2026.
