= Espedito Chionna =

Italian footballer

Personal information
- Date of birth: 29 August 1969 (age 57)
- Place of birth: Latiano, Italy
- Height: 1.83 m (6 ft 0 in)
- Position: Defender

Youth career
- –1985: Mesagne

Senior career*
Years	Team	Apps	(Gls)
1985–1987	Mesagne	28	(0)
1987–1989	Casarano	27	(1)
1989	Catanzaro	0	(0)
1989–1990	Campobasso	19	(0)
1990–1995	Molfetta	141	(7)
1995–1996	Giulianova	28	(2)
1996–2000	Pescara	91	(1)
2000–2002	Palermo	54	(1)
2003	Martina	2	(0)
2003–2004	L'Aquila	12	(0)
2004–2005	Todi	17	(3)
2005–2006	Montalbano		
2006–2007	Casarano		
Total		419	(15)

Managerial career
- 2010–2011: Latiano
- 2011–2012: Boys Mesagne
- * Club domestic league appearances and goals

Espedito Chionna (born 29 August 1969) is an Italian former professional footballer who played as a defender.

== Career ==
Chionna stood out in his career, especially defending the teams Molfetta in Serie C2, Pescara in Serie B and Palermo, where he was champion of Serie C1 in the 2000–01 season. He ended his career playing for Casarano.

As a coach, he had brief experience leading his city's team, Latiano, and Boys Mesagne in the Prima Categoria.

== Honours ==
Palermo

- Serie C1: 2000–01 (group B)
