= Salve, Apulia =

Salve
- Comune
- Comune di Salve
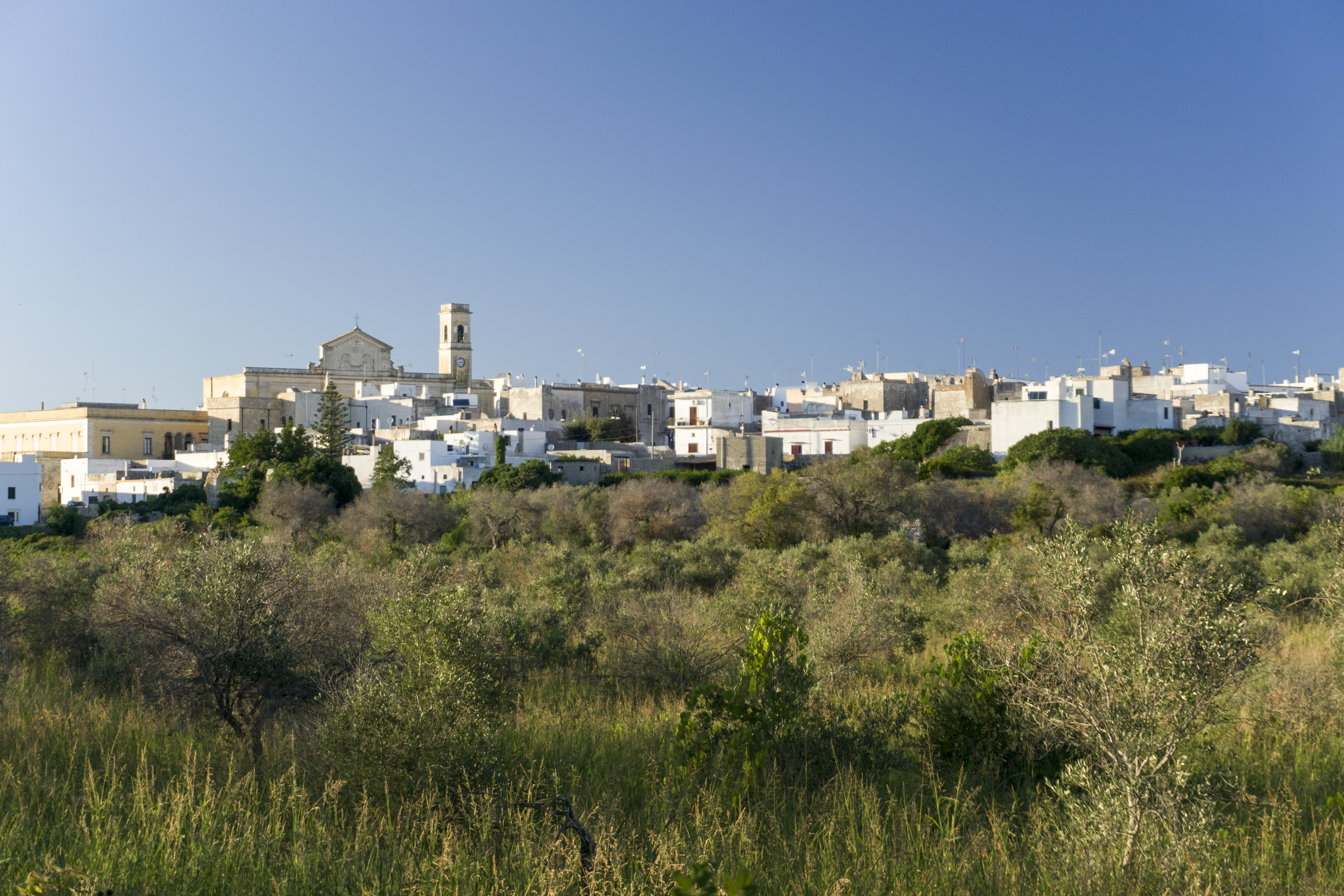
- View of Salve old town

- Coat of arms

- Location within Italy Location within Apulia
- Coordinates: 39°52′N 18°18′E
- Country: Italy
- Region: Apulia
- Province: Lecce (LE)
- Frazioni: Lido Marini, Marina di Pescoluse, Posto Vecchio, Ruggiano, Torre Pali

Government
  - Mayor: Francesco Villanova

Area
  - Total: 33.07 km^{2} (12.77 sq mi)
- Elevation: 130 m (430 ft)

Population (31 August 2020)
  - Total: 4,546
  - Density: 137.5/km^{2} (356.0/sq mi)
- Demonym: Salvesi
- Time zone: UTC+1 (CET)
  - Summer (DST): UTC+2 (CEST)
- Postal code: 73050
- Dialing code: 0833
- Patron saint: St. Nicholas of Bari
- Saint day: 6 December
- Website: Official website

Salve (Salentino: Sarve) is a town and comune of 4,546 inhabitants of the province of Lecce, in the region of Apulia, south-east Italy.

== History ==
Several archaeological digs have shown Bronze Age settlements in the territory of Salve. The origin of the inner city can be traced back to the Roman centurion Salvius, who in 267 BC was granted the land as a reward.

Walls were built in the 9th century AD to defend against Saracen raids. Other extant fortifications were built in the 15th century as a defence against Ottoman raids.

In 1563 the stone tower of Torre Pali was completed. It was erected by Spaniards along with many others on the Salento coast. The tower, which rises from the sea, is about 13 kilometres (8 mi) west of Santa Maria di Leuca. The towers were used as a lookout for Turkish ships and to raise the alarm quickly throughout the Salento by lighting beacons. A village in the commune is named after the tower.

The great reclamation of Ionian coasts of Salento began in 1930. It ended after World War II. Owing to these works, it was possible to develop the beaches on the coast and summer tourism has developed, which today is one of the mainstays of the local economy.

The village has traces of an old Castle (now transformed into houses) which resisted several Turkish sieges. Its parish church dedicated to the patron Saint Nicholas, was decorated by Cesare Penna of Lecce, the younger, an artist of the Lecce Baroque style. The church's historic organ was built in 1628 by G. B. Olgiati of Como and T. Mauro of Muro Leccese. There are also two huge paintings by local sculptor, Vito Russo.
