= Terra di Otranto =

Historical and geographic region of Apulia, Italy

Terra d'Otranto emblem. It stems from the symbol of Aragon and is currently used as the coat of arms of the province of Lecce.

The Terra di Otranto, or Terra d'Otranto (in English, Land of Otranto), is an historical and geographical region of Apulia, largely corresponding to the Salento peninsula, anciently part of the Kingdom of Sicily and later of the Kingdom of Naples, which became a province of the Kingdom of the Two Sicilies.

After the unification of Italy in the 1860s, most of the area was renamed as the province of Lecce.

== History ==
Since the eleventh century, have formed an integral part of the Terra d'Otranto the territories of today's provinces of Lecce, Taranto and Brindisi (with the exception of Fasano, Cisternino) and, until 1663, there had also included the territory of Matera.

Constituted executioner, the territory remained the administrative organization in the Kingdom of Sicily Kingdom of Naples and the next. Its capital was, at first, Otranto, but, during the Norman period (twelfth century), the city's canal was replaced by Lecce.

== Geography ==
The Otranto was bounded on the north with the Terra di Bari, Basilicata to the west, with the Ionian Sea to the south and east by the Adriatic Sea.

It stretched for about 140 km from the so-called "threshold Messapian" located to the north, to Santa Maria di Leuca south, and on average for about 40 km between the Gulf of Taranto to the west and the Strait of Otranto in the east and then contained the whole Salento peninsula, but also a substantial part of the Murgia, known as the Valle d'Itria, and a part of the Alta Murgia declines towards the Ionian Sea.

By Act 132 of 1806 on the division and administration of the provinces of the Kingdom, launched on 8 August of that year, Joseph Bonaparte reformed the territorial division of the Kingdom of Naples on the basis of the French model, and abolished the system of justice. In the following years (between 1806 and 1811), a series of royal decrees completed the path for the establishment of the provinces with the specification of the municipalities covered in them and the definition of territorial boundaries and names of districts and districts in which it was divided each province.

From 1 January 1817 the administrative organization was finally regulated with the Law concerning the administrative district of the provinces of the Royal side of Faro Domains on 1 May 1816.

The seat of the administrative building was located in Lecce in the Celestine current seat of the prefecture.

== Administrative Subdivision ==
The province was divided into the following hierarchical administrative levels from the previous employees. At the level immediately next to the province to identify the districts, in turn, were divided into districts. The districts were constituted by the municipalities, the basic unit of political and administrative structure of the modern state, which could head to the villages, a predominantly rural centers.

The province of Terra d'Otranto, therefore, included the following districts:

- District of Lecce, established in 1806
- District of Taranto, founded in 1806
- District of Brindisi, established in 1806
- District of Gallipoli, established in 1806

Each district was divided into districts for a total of 44

== Suppression of the province ==
After the unification of Italy, the Terra d'Otranto was renamed the Province of Lecce. The four districts where his territory was divided into districts remained unchanged and became the Kingdom of Italy.

During the twentieth century, the historical territory of the province will be dismembered with the creation in 1923, the Province of the Ionian and in 1927, the Province of Brindisi (which were common two aggregates, Fasano, Cisternino, formerly belonging to Bari).

== Arms ==
The coat of arms depicts a dolphin with a crescent symbol of the Turks in its mouth.

The crescent was inserted after the end of the Ottoman invasion of Otranto (1480–1481), when Alfonso of Aragon, son of King Ferdinand I of Naples, retook the city and the nearby areas on 10 September 1481.

== Cuisine ==
Its name is also the name of a PDO extra-virgin olive oil called Terra d'Otranto.

== See also ==
- Apulia
- Otranto
- Salento
- Terra d'Otranto (Extra-virgin olive oil)
