= Carovigno =

Municipality in Apulia, Italy

- Comune
- Comune di Carovigno
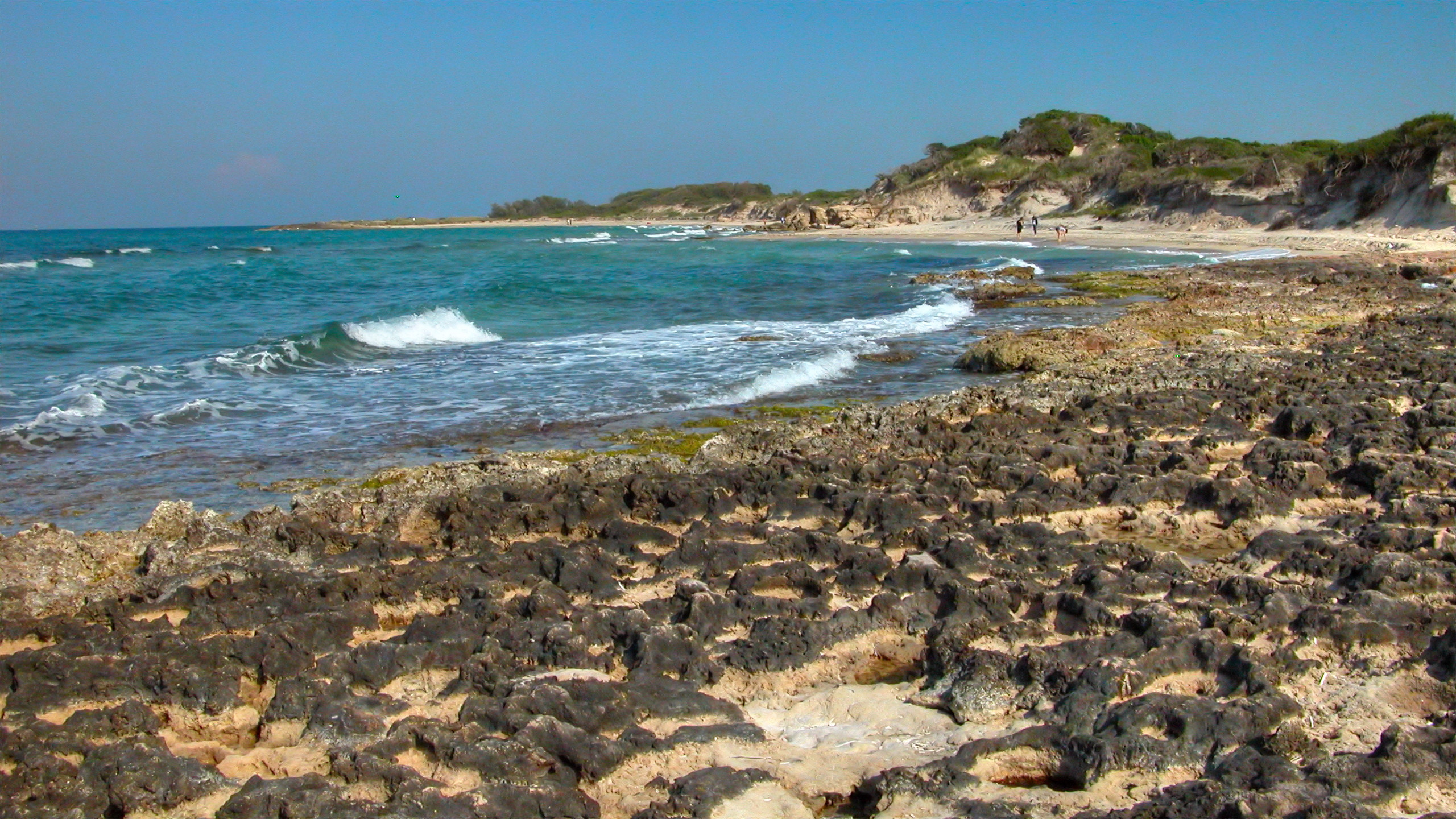
- The State Natural Preserve of Torre Guaceto

- Coat of arms

- Location within Italy Location within Apulia
- Coordinates: 40°42′N 17°40′E
- Country: Italy
- Region: Apulia
- Province: Brindisi (BR)
- Frazioni: Pantanagianni, Serranova, Specchiolla, Torre Santa Sabina

Government
  - Mayor: Massimo Lanzillotti

Area
  - Total: 106.62 km^{2} (41.17 sq mi)
- Elevation: 172 m (564 ft)

Population (31 December 2017)
  - Total: 17,120
  - Density: 160.6/km^{2} (415.9/sq mi)
- Demonym: Carovignesi
- Time zone: UTC+1 (CET)
  - Summer (DST): UTC+2 (CEST)
- Postal code: 72012
- Dialing code: 0831
- Patron saint: Maria S.Sma di Belvedere, Sts. James and Philip
- Saint day: Monday, Tuesday and Saturday after Easter
- Website: Official website

Carovigno (Carovignese: Carvìgni; Latin: Carbina) is a town and municipality (Italian: comune) in the province of Brindisi and region of Apulia, in southern Italy. The town of Carovigno has a population of 17,000 residents. Being located in upper Salento, Carovigno is renowned for its production of olive oil. Additionally, the city offers several local opportunities for tourists, including its close proximity to the sea, the beautiful landscapes of Apulia, and the cultural depth of Salento.

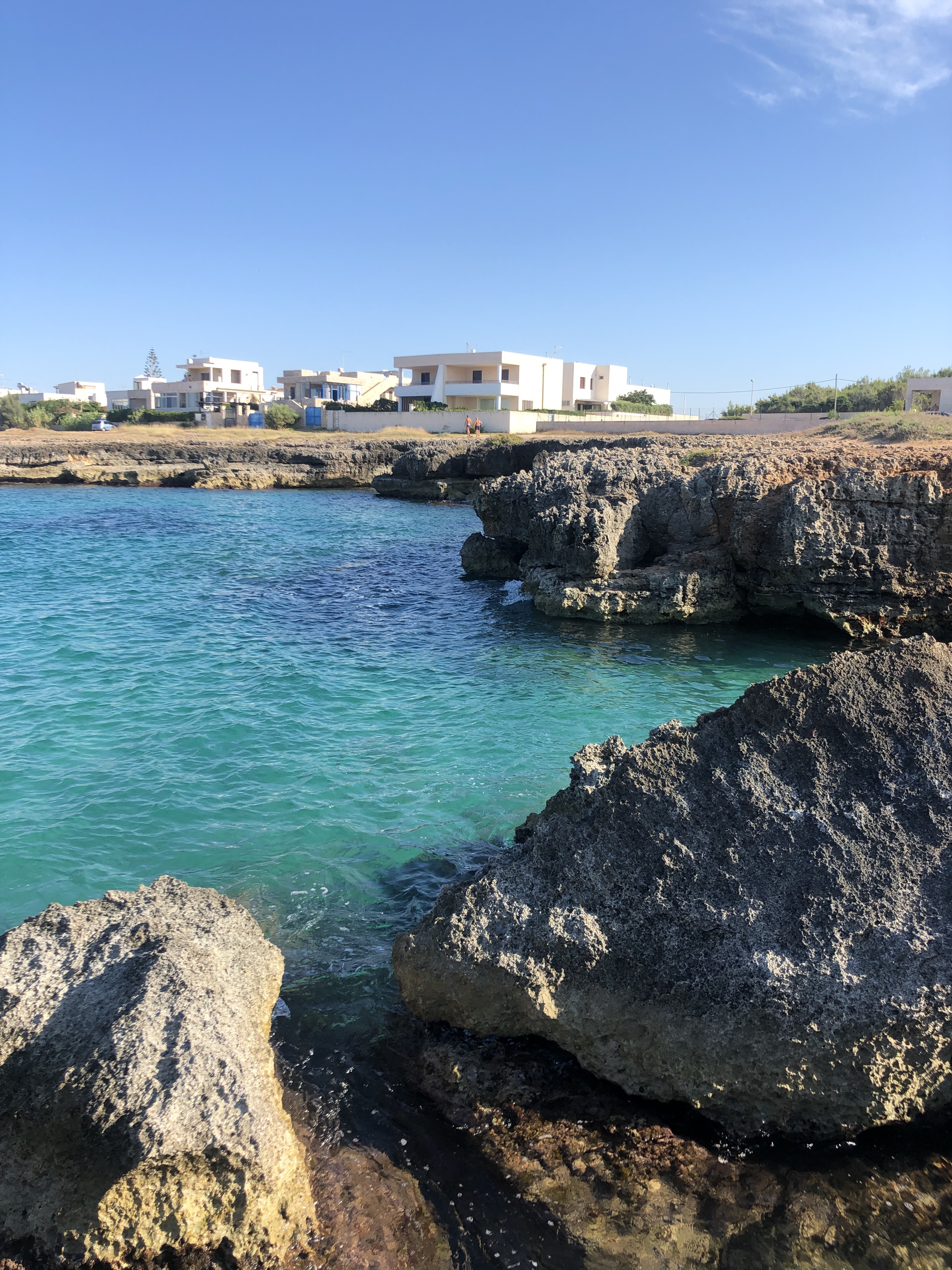
Sea view in Carovigno

Each year Carovigno receives many tourists from several other countries (such as Germany and England). The tourist sector has begun to flourish over the past few years as the city is slowly beginning to develop and neighbouring areas, such as Ostuni, have also recently become popular travel destinations.

== Physical and political geography ==
Carovigno is in the northern part of Salento.

It is 161 metres (528 feet) above sea level, 7 kilometres (4 miles) from the Adriatic and 30 kilometres (19 mi) from Brindisi.

Nearest towns are Ostuni - 5 kilometres (3 mi) away, San Vito dei Normanni - 6 kilometres (4 mi) away, and San Michele Salentino - 10 kilometres (6 mi) away.

== Main sights ==
- The Dentice di Frasso Castle which dominates the old town. It was built in the 14th-15th century.
- Castle of Serranova
- Santa Sabina Tower and Guaceto Tower, two coastal watchtowers built in the 16th century

== International relations ==
Carovigno is twinned with:

- Corfu, Greece
