= Villa Castelli =

- Comune
- Comune di Villa Castelli
- Coat of arms

- Location within Italy Location within Apulia
- Coordinates: 40°35′N 17°29′E
- Country: Italy
- Region: Apulia
- Province: Brindisi (BR)
- Frazioni: Monte Scotano, Pezza Petrosa, Antoglia, Lamie della Battaglia, Monte Fellone, Pezza delle Monache Centrale

Government
  - Mayor: Giovanni Barletta (Diventerà bellissima)

Area
  - Total: 35.15 km^{2} (13.57 sq mi)
- Elevation: 251 m (823 ft)
- Highest elevation: 325 m (1,066 ft)
- Lowest elevation: 149 m (489 ft)

Population (30 May 2017)
  - Total: 10,640
  - Density: 302.7/km^{2} (784.0/sq mi)
- Demonym: Castellano
- Time zone: UTC+1 (CET)
  - Summer (DST): UTC+2 (CEST)
- Postal code: 72029
- Dialing code: 0831
- Saint day: 3 October
- Website: Official website

Villa Castelli is a comune in the province of Brindisi in Apulia, on the south-east Italy coast. It is a comune in Salento, the borderline with Itria Valley. Its main economic activities are tourism and the growing of olives and grapes.

== Main sights ==
The main attractions are the Castle (or Ducal Palace) and the church of Immacolata. The castle was built by the Orsini del Balzo in the Middle Ages but was already in ruins in the 15th century. In the 17th century the Emperor bought it and turned it into a fortress, and later it was further expanded by the Ungaro. The church was built in the 10th century in an eclectic style, with both Gothic and Romanesque features.

The countryside around is home to numerous prehistoric trulli.

== Twin towns ==
- Kalyvia Thorikou, Greece
