= Torre Santa Susanna =

- Comune
- Comune di Torre Santa Susanna
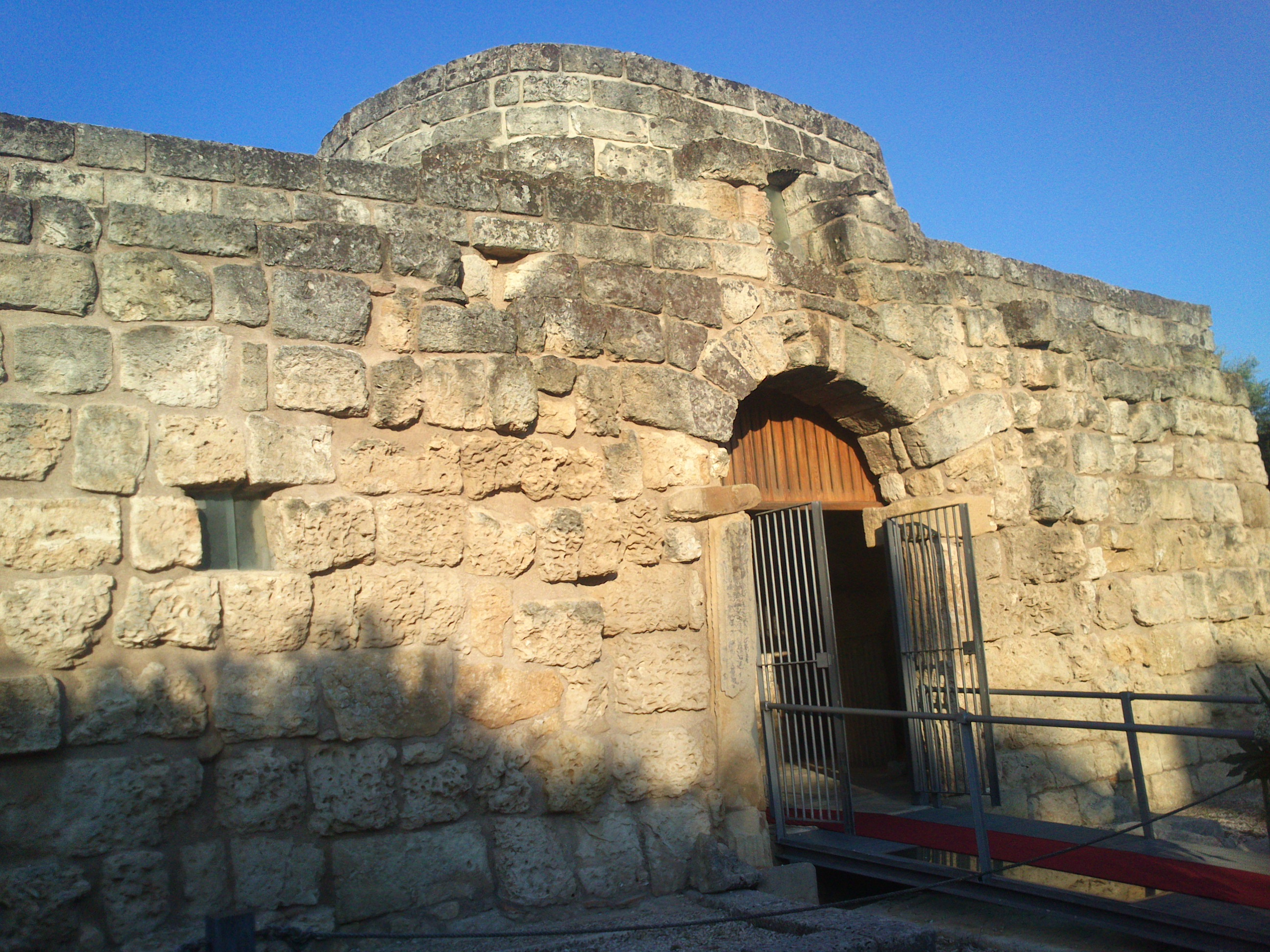
- Church of Crepacore

- Location within Italy Location within Apulia
- Coordinates: 40°28′N 17°44′E
- Country: Italy
- Region: Apulia
- Province: Brindisi (BR)

Government
  - Mayor: Michele Saccomanno

Area
  - Total: 55 km^{2} (21 sq mi)
- Elevation: 72 m (236 ft)

Population (30 June 2015)
  - Total: 10,601
  - Density: 190/km^{2} (500/sq mi)
- Demonym: Torresi
- Time zone: UTC+1 (CET)
  - Summer (DST): UTC+2 (CEST)
- Postal code: 72028
- Dialing code: 0831
- Patron saint: Saint Susanna
- Saint day: 11 August
- Website: Official website

Torre Santa Susanna (Brindisino: La Torri) is a comune in the province of Brindisi in Apulia, on the south-east Italian coast in the Salento peninsula.

Its main economic activities are tourism and the growing of olives and grapes.

== History ==
The Romans had two forts built here after the Second Punic War. According to tradition, in the 3rd century AD a Roman soldier wrote the name of Saint Susanna on one of these towers ("Torre" in Italian), hence the name. After a series of plagues and earthquakes, population from the nearby hamlet took refuge here, giving birth to the current town.
