= Port of Brindisi =

Italian seaport

Coordinates: 40°39′0″N 17°57′36″E

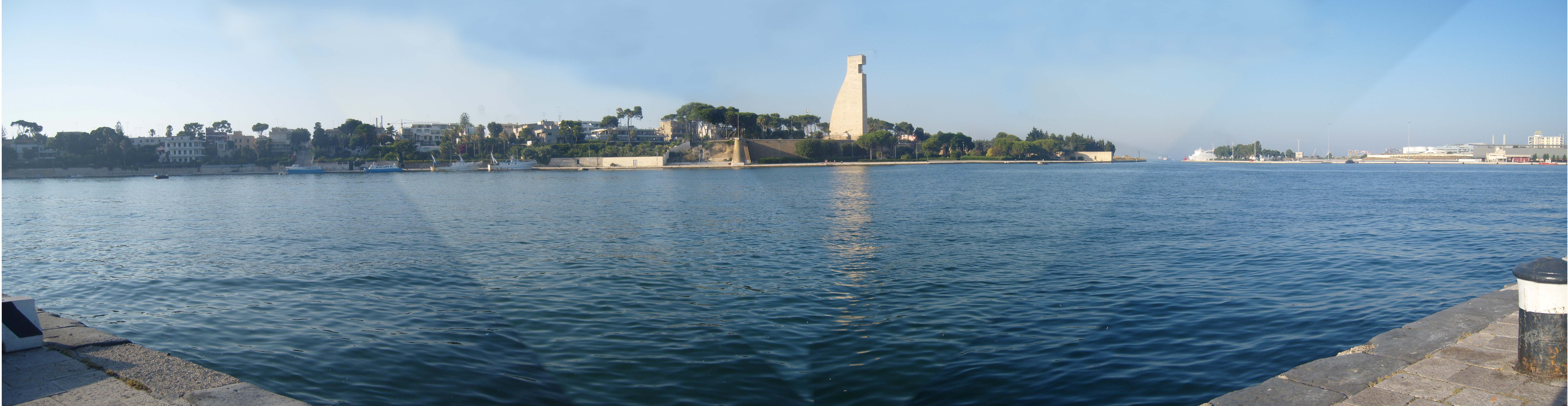
Port of Brindisi

The port of Brindisi is a seaport in Brindisi, Italy. It is used for tourism, commercial and industrial shipping on the Adriatic Sea. Tourist traffic offer connections with the Balkan Peninsula, Greece and Turkey, while commercial concerns include coal, fuel oil, natural gas, and chemicals. For more than two millennia, the harbour has been involved in military and commercial operations.

== Passenger ferry destinations ==
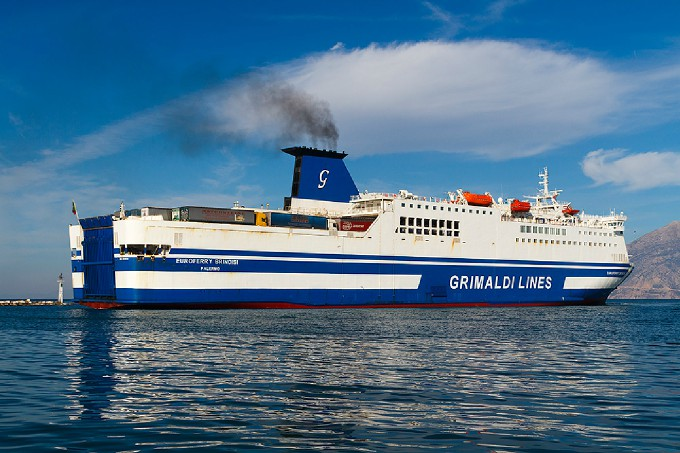
Euroferry Brindisi-Patras on Grimaldi Lines

- Vlorë, European Ferries-Ionian Sky and SHIPS Management-Galaxy
- Igoumenitsa, in Greece, by Grimaldi Lines

== Shipping companies ==
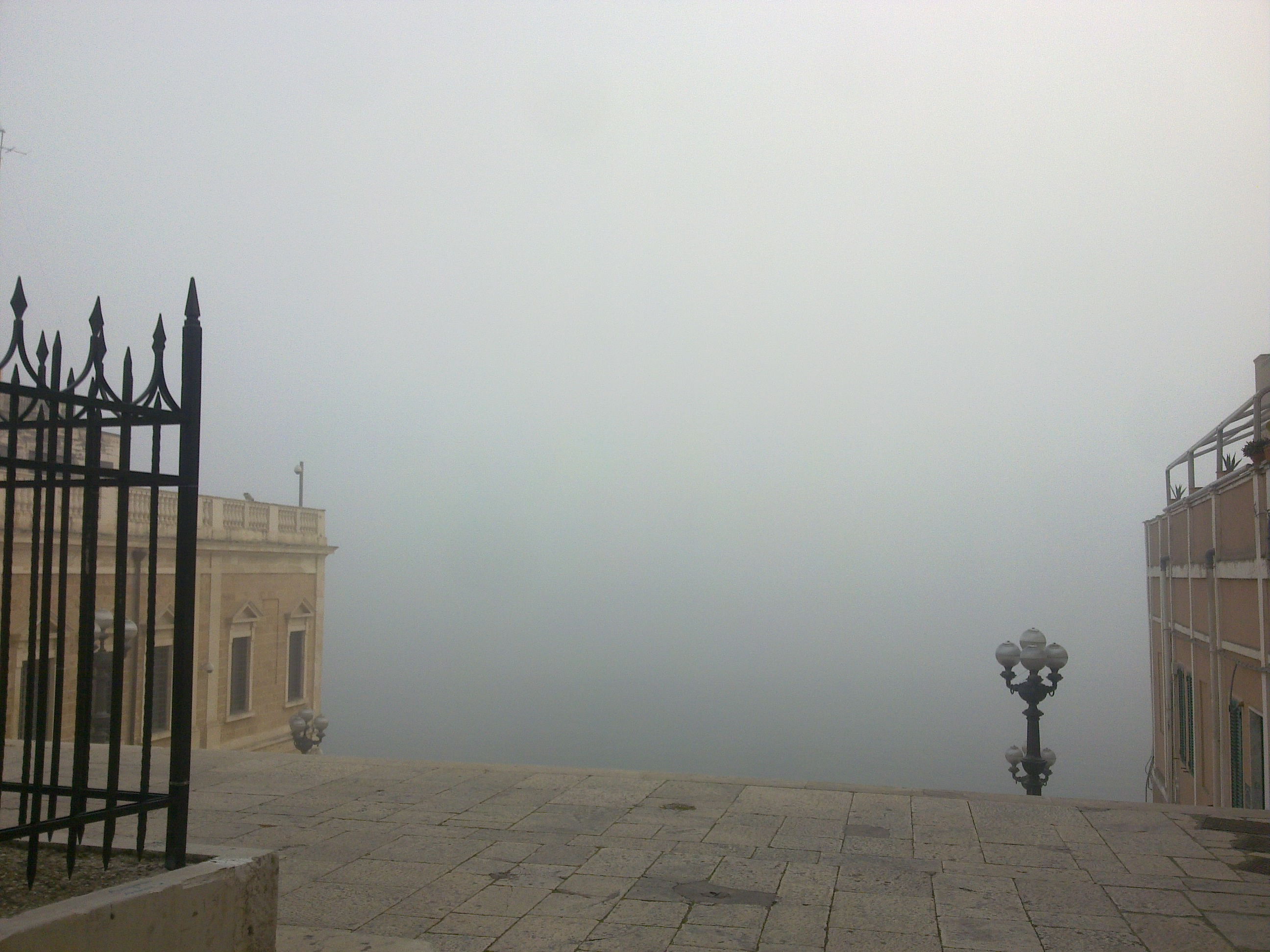
The port in a fog

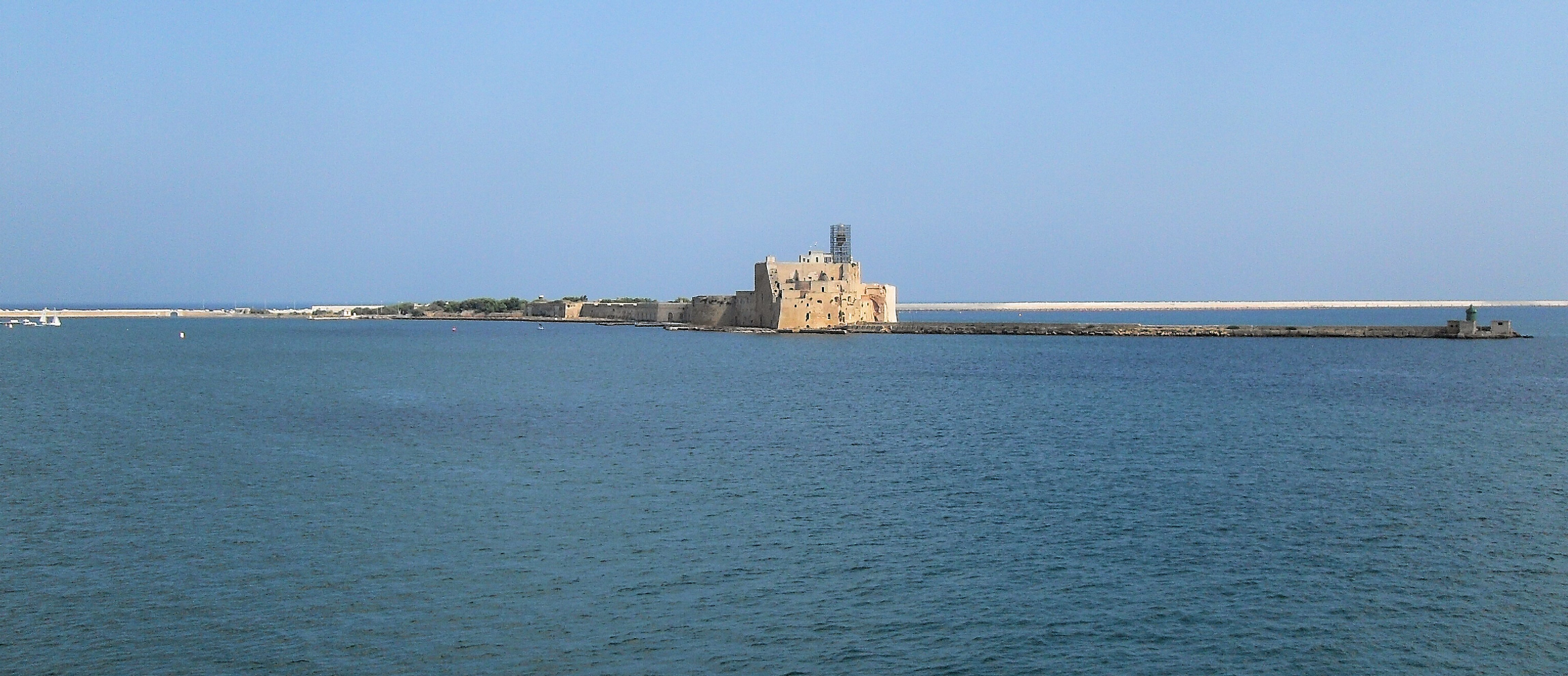
Old pier

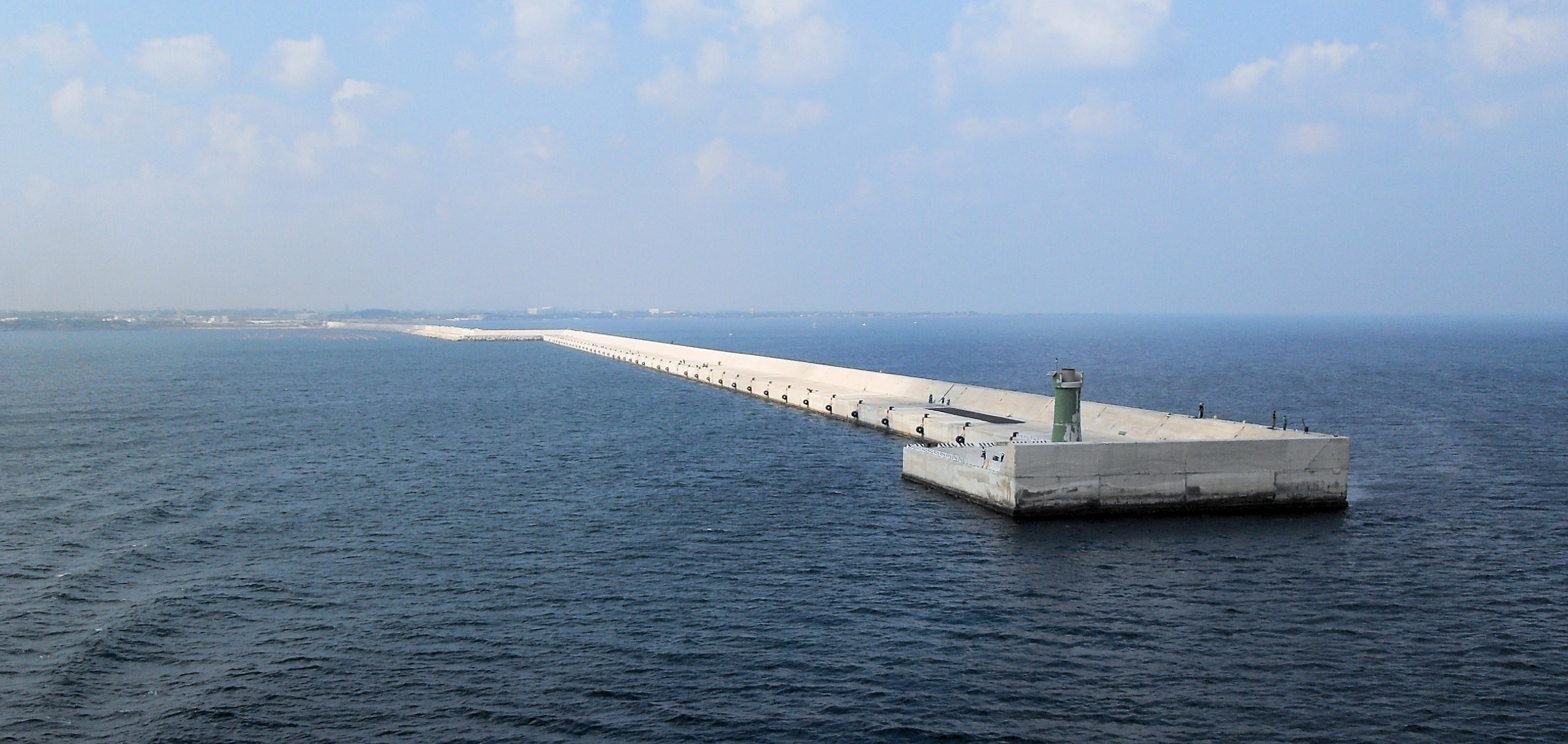
New pier

- Adriatica di Navigazione Brindisi-Corfu-Igoumenitsa-Patrasso ed in passato anche per il Pireo, il Libano, Israele ed Alessandria D'Egitto
- Agoudimos Lines Brindisi-Corfu-Igoumenitsa-Paxos-Cefalonia-Zante-Patrasso
- Endeavor Lines Brindisi-Corfu-Igoumenitsa-Cefalonia-Zante-Patrasso
- European Sealines Brindisi-Corfu-Igoumenitsa-Paxos-Zante
- Hellenic Mediterranean Lines Brindisi-Corfu-Igoumenitsa-Patasso ed in passato anche rotte per il Pireo
- Maritime way Brindisi-Corfu-Igoumenitsa-Cefalonia-Patrasso
- Minoan Lines Brindisi-Corfu-Igoumenitsa-Patrasso
- Fragline Brindisi-Corfu-Igoumenitsa
- Blue Star Ferries (Strintzis Lines) Brindisi-Corfu-Igoumenitsa
- Ventouris Ferries Brindisi-Corfu-Igoumenitsa
- European Sealines Brindisi-Corfu-Igoumenitsa e Brindisi-Corfu-Paxi-Zante
- Marmara Lines Brindisi - Çeşme
- Snav: catamarano Brindisi-Corfu-Paxos
- Harmonica Lines Brindisi-Igoumenitsa
- Med Link Lines Brindisi-Igoumenitsa-Patrasso-Cefalonia-Cesme
- European Seaways Brindisi-Corfù-Igoumenitsa
- Superferries Brindisi-Cesme
- Five stars Line Brindisi-Corfu-Igoumenitsa-Patrasso-Cefalonia
- Mega Stars Line Brindisi-Cesme
- Turkish Maritime Lines Brindisi-Cesme
- Delir Lines Brindisi-Igoumenitsa-Cesme
- Marlines Brindisi-corfù-Igoumenitsa-Patrasso
- Poseidon Lines Brindisi-Corfù-Igoumenitsa
- Adriatic Seaways Brindisi-Corfù-Igoumenitsa
- Access Ferries Brindisi-Igoumenitsa-Cesme
- Palmier Ferries Brindisi-Corfù-Paxi-Igoumenitsa
- Sancak Line Brindisi-Cesme
- Ga Ferries Brindisi-Corfù-Igoumenitsa-Patrasso-Cefalonia
- Ak Ventouris Brindisi-Igoumenitsa-Patrasso-Cefalonia
- Anatolia Ferries Brindisi-Igoumenitsa-Cesme
- Vergina Ferries Brindisi-Igoumenitsa-Patrasso-Cefalonia
- Illyria Lines Brindisi-Durazzo-Valona
- Azzurra Lines Bari-Brindisi-Durazzo
- Veronica Lines Brindisi-Valona
- Skenderbeg Lines Brindisi-Valona
- Rml Lines Brindisi-Igoumenitsa
- Nel Lines Brindisi-Corfù-Igoumenitsa-Cefalonia-Zante
- Prosperity Navigation Brindisi-Valona
- Ikaria Lines Brindisi-Valona
- Rainbow Lines Brindisi-Durazzo-Igoumenitsa
- South Lines Brindisi-Durazzo
- Far East Maritime Brindisi-Valona

== See also ==
- Brindisi Airport
- Bari Airport
- Lecce

== Bibliography ==
- Morena, Marzia (2011). Morphological, Technological and Functional Characteristics of Infrastructures as a Vital Sector for the Competitiveness of a Country System: An Analysis of the Evolution of Waterfronts. Maggioli Editore. ISBN 978-88-387-6077-8.
