= Erchie =

Erchie Eracle (Greek)
- Comune
- Comune di Erchie
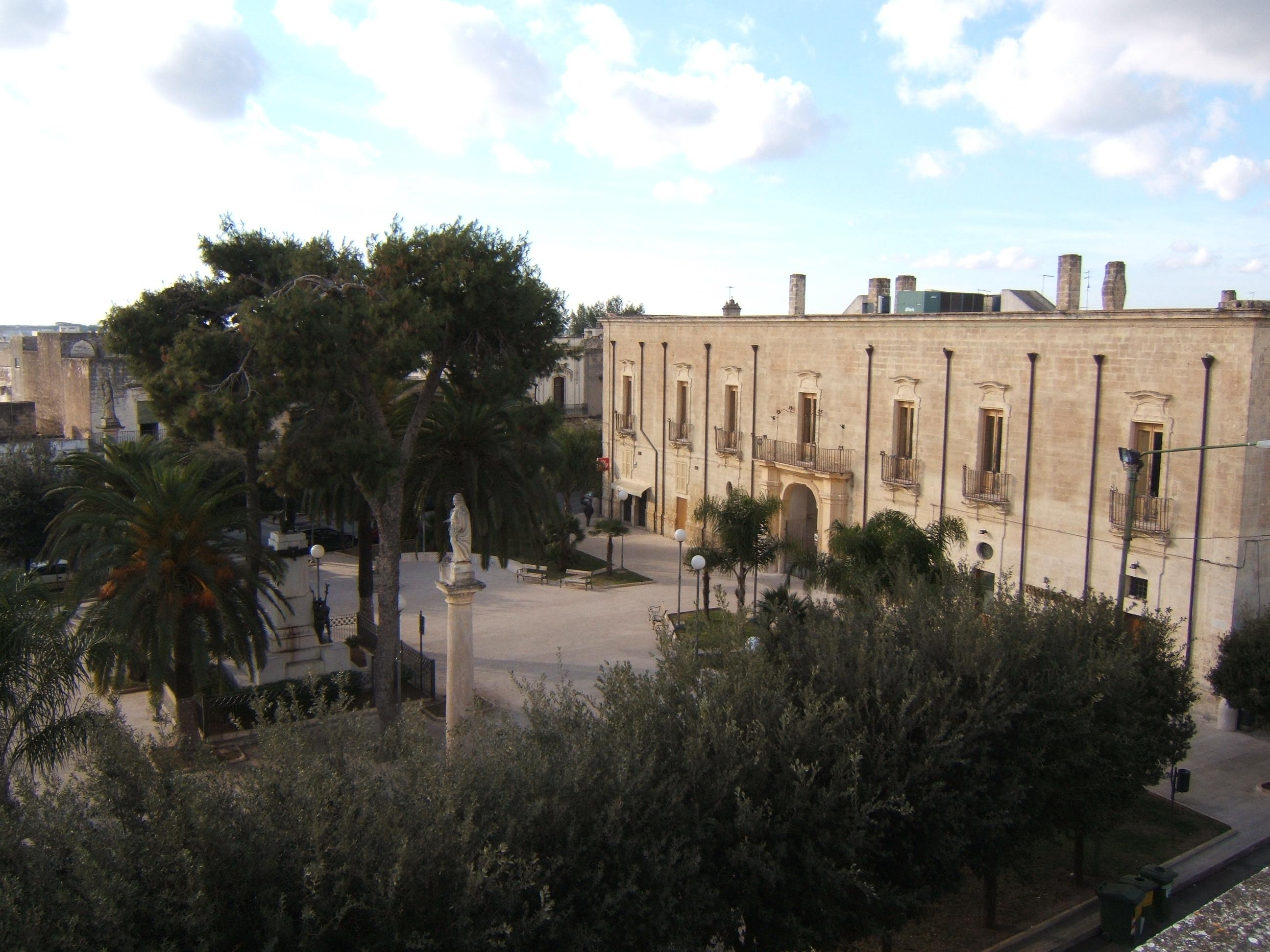
- Ducal Palace at Erchie, with columns of Saints Irene and Lucia

- Location within Italy Location within Apulia
- Coordinates: 40°26′N 17°44′E
- Country: Italy
- Region: Apulia
- Province: Brindisi (BR)

Area
  - Total: 44 km^{2} (17 sq mi)
- Elevation: 68 m (223 ft)

Population (31 December 2017)
  - Total: 8,671
  - Density: 200/km^{2} (510/sq mi)
- Demonym: Erchiolani
- Time zone: UTC+1 (CET)
  - Summer (DST): UTC+2 (CEST)
- Postal code: 72020
- Dialing code: 0831
- Patron saint: Santa Lucia and Sant'Irene
- Saint day: 5 June and 13 December
- Website: Official website

Erchie (Brindisino: Erchi) is a comune in the province of Brindisi in Apulia, on the south-east Italy coast. Its main economic activities are tourism and the growing of olives and grapes.

== People ==
- Alfredo Nigro, (1975) opera singer
- Mauro Lacandia, (1990) singer (Tarantola)
- Sergio Contessa, (1990) football player (Lecce, Padova)
- John Apulia, (67 BC) martyr
