= Cellino San Marco =

Cellino San Marco Cilinu
- Comune
- Comune di Cellino San Marco
- Location within Italy Location within Apulia
- Coordinates: 40°28′N 17°58′E
- Country: Italy
- Region: Apulia
- Province: Brindisi (BR)

Government
  - Mayor: Marco Marra

Area
  - Total: 37.84 km^{2} (14.61 sq mi)
- Elevation: 56 m (184 ft)

Population (30 June 2017)
  - Total: 6,531
  - Density: 172.6/km^{2} (447.0/sq mi)
- Demonym: Cellinesi
- Time zone: UTC+1 (CET)
  - Summer (DST): UTC+2 (CEST)
- Postal code: 72020
- Dialing code: 0831
- Patron saint: Mark the Evangelist; Catherine of Alexandria
- Saint day: 25 April, 25 November
- Website: www.csm.br.it

Cellino San Marco (Leccese: Cilinu) is a comune (municipality) in the province of Brindisi in Salento, Apulia, on the south-east coast of Italy. Its main economic activities are tourism and the growing of olives and grapes.

== People ==
- Albano Carrisi (born 1943), singer
- Francesco Perrone (1930–2020), long-distance runner
