= San Pancrazio Salentino =

- Comune
- Comune di San Pancrazio Salentino
- Location within Italy Location within Apulia
- Coordinates: 40°25′N 17°50′E
- Country: Italy
- Region: Apulia
- Province: Brindisi (BR)

Area
  - Total: 55 km^{2} (21 sq mi)
- Elevation: 62 m (203 ft)

Population (30 September 2012)
  - Total: 10,289
  - Density: 190/km^{2} (480/sq mi)
- Demonym: Sanpancraziesi or Sampancraziesi
- Time zone: UTC+1 (CET)
  - Summer (DST): UTC+2 (CEST)
- Postal code: 72026
- Dialing code: 0831
- Patron saint: St. Pancras of Rome
- Saint day: 12 May
- Website: Official website

San Pancrazio Salentino (Brindisino: Sammangràziu) is a comune in the province of Brindisi in Apulia, on the south-east Italy coast. Its main economic activities are tourism and the growing of olives and grapes.

== Twin towns ==
San Pancrazio Salentino is twinned with:

- Bisceglie, Italy
