= San Michele Salentino =

- Comune
- Comune di San Michele Salentino
- Street view in 2022

- Coat of arms

- Location within Italy Location within Apulia
- Coordinates: 40°38′N 17°38′E
- Country: Italy
- Region: Apulia
- Province: Brindisi (BR)
- Frazioni: Borgata Ajeni

Government
  - Mayor: Giovanni Allegrini

Area
  - Total: 26 km^{2} (10 sq mi)
- Elevation: 153 m (502 ft)

Population (31 December 2010)
  - Total: 6,372
  - Density: 250/km^{2} (630/sq mi)
- Demonym: Sammichelani
- Time zone: UTC+1 (CET)
  - Summer (DST): UTC+2 (CEST)
- Postal code: 72018
- Dialing code: 0831
- Patron saint: St. Michael Archangel
- Saint day: 29 September
- Website: Official website

San Michele Salentino is a comune in the province of Brindisi in Apulia, on the south-east Italian coast. Its main economic activities are the growing of olives and grapes.

== International relations ==
San Michele Salentino is twinned with:

- Monte Sant'Angelo, Italy (since 2007)
