= Province of Brindisi =

Province of Italy

Coordinates: 40°38′18″N 17°56′45″E

Province of Brindisi Provincia di Brindisi (Italian)
- Province
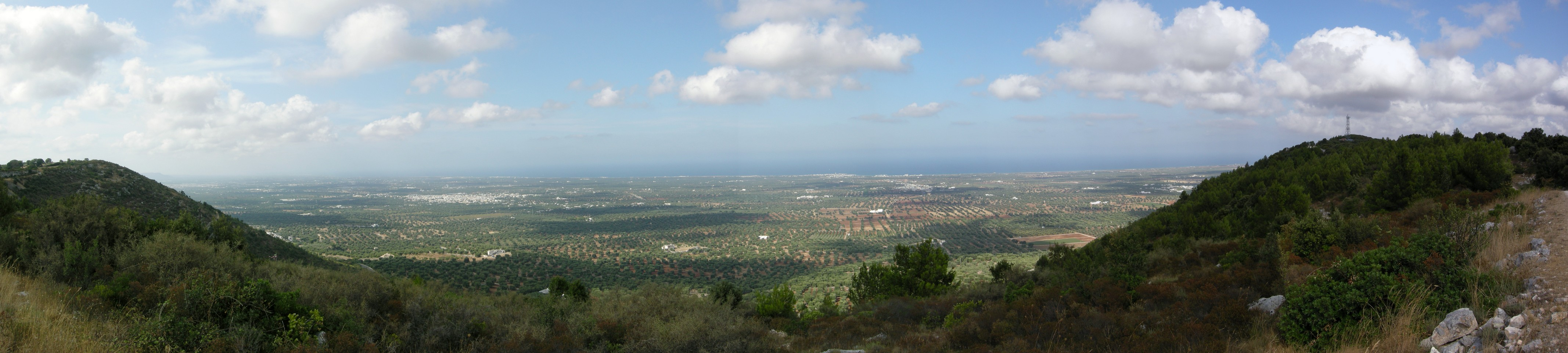
- Itria Valley

- Flag Coat of arms

- Location of the province of Brindisi in Italy
- Country: Italy
- Region: Apulia
- Capital(s): Brindisi
- Municipalities: 20

Government
  - President: Elio Ciccarese

Area
  - Total: 1,861.12 km^{2} (718.58 sq mi)

Population (2026)
  - Total: 373,631
  - Density: 200.756/km^{2} (519.956/sq mi)

GDP
  - Total: €12/14 billion (2024)
  - Per capita: €24.000
- Time zone: UTC+1 (CET)
  - Summer (DST): UTC+2 (CEST)
- Postal code: 72012-72015, 72017-72018, 72020-72027, 72029
- Telephone prefix: 080, 0831
- Vehicle registration: BR
- ISTAT code: 074

The province of Brindisi (Italian: provincia di Brindisi) is a province in the region of Apulia in southern Italy. Its capital is the city of Brindisi. It has a population of 373,631 in an area of 1,861.12 square kilometres (718.58 sq mi) across its 20 municipalities.

This is the richest provinces in southern Italy, home of dynamic industries and many hotels and resorts.

It's characterized by incredible landscapes, like the Parco delle Dune Costiere, Riserva di Torre Guaceto, Piana degli Ulivi Monumentali and the Valle d'Itria.

It's also home to UNESCO's world heritage sites, like the Via Appia and the traditional rural buildings, the Trulli.

== Geography ==
The Province of Brindisi is situated in southeastern Italy, extending for 1,839 square kilometres (710 mi^{2}), the second smallest province in the region after the Province of Barletta-Andria-Trani. It was established in 1927 from the ancient Terra d'Otranto. With the Adriatic Sea to the east, it is bordered to the north by the Province of Bari, on the west by the Province of Taranto and to the south-east by the Province of Lecce. The northern, central and western parts are hilly with much woodland, with the Murgia hills of particular note, while to the north-west, bordering on the provinces of Taranto and Bari, it is lower-lying, with the Itria Valley (Valle d'Itria). The maximum height reached within the province is 414 metres (1,358 ft) above sea level, near Selva di Fasano. The other peaks are slightly lower and are all located in the north-central area. The coastline in the province is 80.606 kilometres (50.086 mi) long, partly rocky, with many alternating stretches of sandy beaches, small harbours and bays. To the south it is essentially flat and widely used for crops.

The province, according to the Geological Map of Italy, prepared by the Geological Survey of Italy, is composed of various types of land: in the central-southern area there is a predominance of dolomitic limestone (present generally in the inhabited zone from the plateau of the Murgia), small eluvial deposits, sand, clay, grey silted marshes (around Francavilla Fontana, Oria and San Donaci), chalk and limestone, including firm bioclastic limestone and chalky sandstone. In the north-central part, particularly Bari and Mola, the limestone stems from the Late Cretaceous, and deposits of limestone and sandstone date back to the Pleistocene. There are no significant rivers, because of the karst terrain, but there are many springs that gush out producing little streams. As for waterways, the longest is the Canale Reale, which flows into the territory of Villa Castelli, bordering Francavilla Fontana, and flows into the Natural Reserve of Torre Guaceto. Along the coast, in addition, there are numerous ponds and small freshwater lakes, fed by underground aquifers.

== Government ==
=== Municipalities ===
The province has 20 municipalities:

- Brindisi
- Carovigno
- Ceglie Messapica
- Cellino San Marco
- Cisternino
- Erchie
- Fasano
- Francavilla Fontana
- Latiano
- Mesagne
- Oria
- Ostuni
- San Donaci
- San Michele Salentino
- San Pancrazio Salentino
- San Pietro Vernotico
- San Vito dei Normanni
- Torchiarolo
- Torre Santa Susanna
- Villa Castelli

== Demographics ==
Historical population
Year	Pop.	±%
1861	114,790	—
1871	129,392	+12.7%
1881	146,273	+13.0%
1901	176,242	+20.5%
1911	194,596	+10.4%
1921	217,796	+11.9%
1931	244,115	+12.1%
1936	254,062	+4.1%
1951	313,006	+23.2%
1961	345,635	+10.4%
1971	366,027	+5.9%
1981	391,064	+6.8%
1991	411,314	+5.2%
2001	402,422	−2.2%
2011	400,801	−0.4%
2021	381,273	−4.9%
Source: ISTAT

As of 2026, the population is 373,631, of which 48.6% are male, and 51.4% are female. Minors make up 13.9% of the population, and seniors make up 26.2%.

=== Immigration ===
As of 2025, immigrants make up 5.7% of the population. The 5 largest foreign countries of birth are Germany, Albania, Romania, Switzerland, and Morocco.

== Economy ==
Surrounded by vineyards, artichoke and olive groves, the city of Brindisi is a major sailing port for the southern part of Italy. In modern times, the province has experienced a process of change in its economic structure, with a progressive decrease in the weight of industry and growth of the tertiary sector. A significant increase in tourism, due to a good infrastructure has been witnessed, as well as the growth of its artistic and culinary assets.

In 2011, the principal sectors of activity in the province were commerce (30%), agriculture (27%) and construction (13%), together representing 70% of the economy. The number of enterprises rose to a peak of 38,435 in 2005 but thereafter fell to 37,304 in 2011. Of these, 8,453 were active in agriculture, mainly in crop production with small percentages in the areas of livestock, agricultural support and mixed farming.

=== Tourism ===
From the beginning of the 1980s to the end of the 1990s the Port of Brindisi was the starting point for tourists who passed from Italy to Greece. Subsequently, the tourist demand became increasingly strong also in the rest of the province of Brindisi. Beaches include the Torre Guaceto and the Ostuni beaches. In addition to its beaches, Ostuni is noted for its citadel, city walls, cathedral, and numerous mansions and is one of the main tourist attractions in the province. Another city noted for its tourism is Oria, which includes a 13th-century castle built by Frederick II, cathedral, and Jewish history.
