= Torchiarolo =

- Comune
- Comune di Torchiarolo
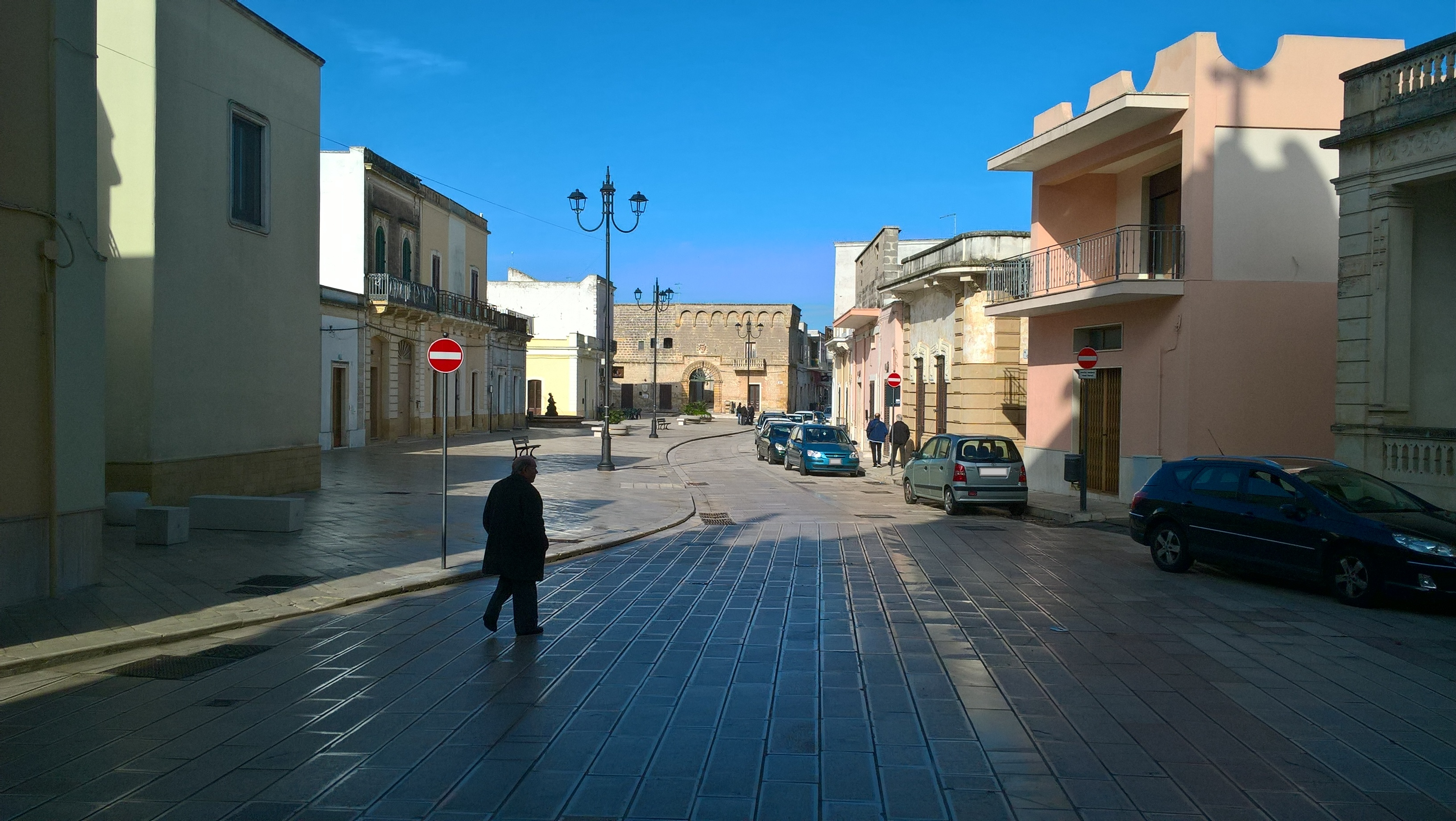
- View of Torchiarolo

- Location within Italy Location within Apulia
- Coordinates: 40°29′N 18°3′E
- Country: Italy
- Region: Apulia
- Province: Brindisi (BR)
- Frazioni: Lendinuso, Torre San Gennaro, Lido Presepe

Government
  - Mayor: Elio Ciccarese

Area
  - Total: 32 km^{2} (12 sq mi)
- Elevation: 28 m (92 ft)

Population (31 December 2017)
  - Total: 5,419
  - Density: 170/km^{2} (440/sq mi)
- Demonym: Torchiarolesi
- Time zone: UTC+1 (CET)
  - Summer (DST): UTC+2 (CEST)
- Postal code: 72020
- Dialing code: 0831
- Website: Official website

Torchiarolo is a comune in the province of Brindisi in Apulia, on the south-east coast of Italy. Its main economic activities are tourism and the growing of olives and grapes.
