= San Donaci =

- Comune
- Comune di San Donaci
- Location within Italy Location within Apulia
- Coordinates: 40°27′N 17°55′E
- Country: Italy
- Region: Apulia
- Province: Brindisi (BR)

Government
  - Mayor: Angelo Marasco

Area
  - Total: 34.04 km^{2} (13.14 sq mi)
- Elevation: 42 m (138 ft)

Population (31 December 2015)
  - Total: 6,768
  - Density: 198.8/km^{2} (515.0/sq mi)
- Demonym: Sandonacesi
- Time zone: UTC+1 (CET)
  - Summer (DST): UTC+2 (CEST)
- Postal code: 72025
- Dialing code: 0831
- Patron saint: Santa Maria
- Saint day: 5 August
- Website: Official website

San Donaci is a comune in the province of Brindisi in Apulia, on the southeast coast of Italy. Its main economic activities are tourism and the growing of olives and grapes.
