= Latiano =

- Comune
- Comune di Latiano
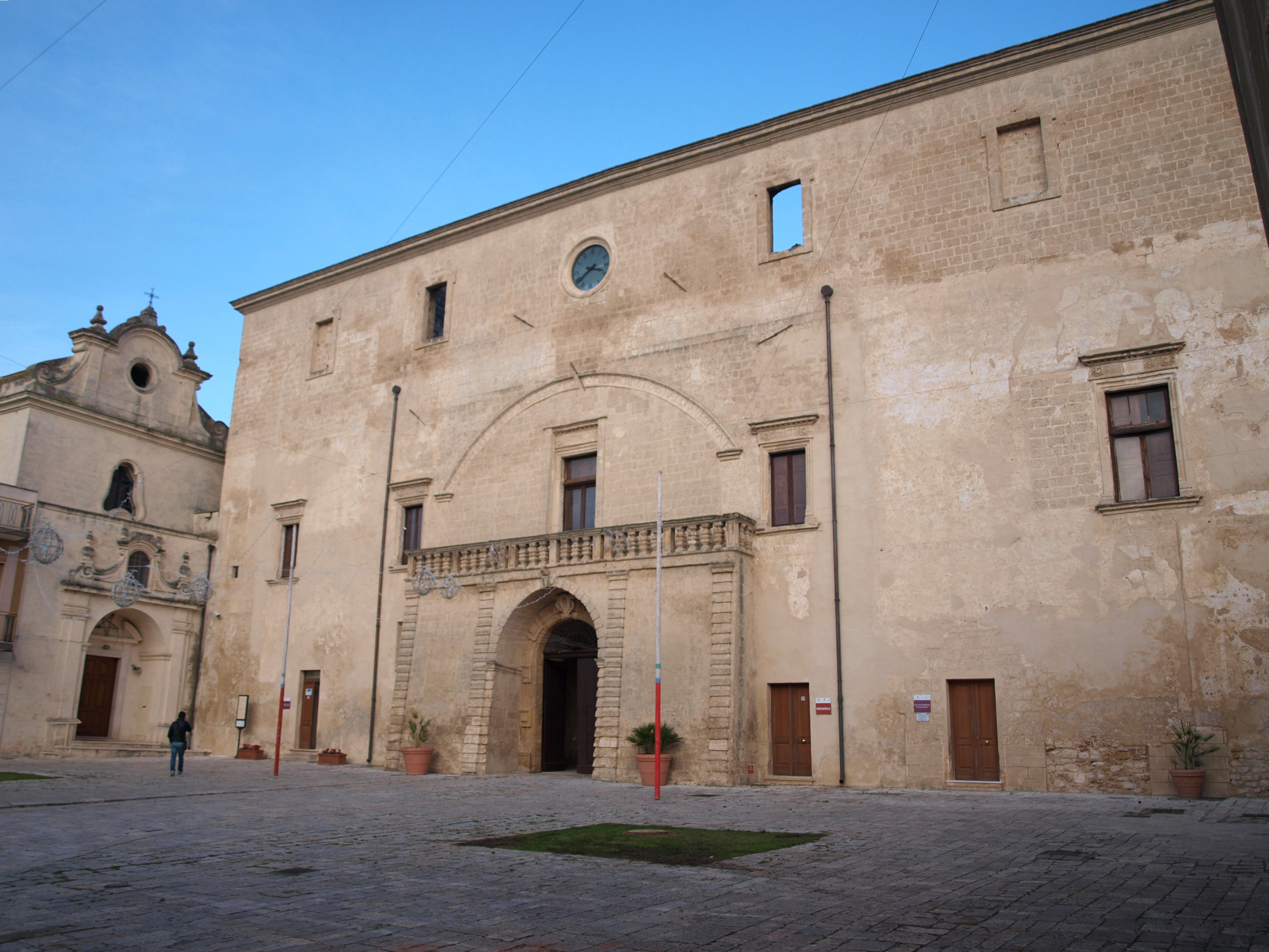
- View of the historical centre

- Coat of arms

- Location within Italy Location within Apulia
- Coordinates: 40°32′N 17°43′E
- Country: Italy
- Region: Apulia
- Province: Brindisi (BR)

Government
  - Mayor: Cosimo Maiorano

Area
  - Total: 54 km^{2} (21 sq mi)
- Elevation: 97 m (318 ft)

Population (31 August 2017)
  - Total: 14,513
  - Density: 270/km^{2} (700/sq mi)
- Demonym: Latianesi
- Time zone: UTC+1 (CET)
  - Summer (DST): UTC+2 (CEST)
- Postal code: 72022
- Dialing code: 0831
- Patron saint: St. Margaret the Virgin
- Saint day: 20 July
- Website: Official website

Latiano (Brindisino: Latianu; Leccese: Latianea) is a comune in the province of Brindisi in Apulia, on the southeast coast of Italy. Its main economic activities are tourism and the growing of olives and grapes.

Bartolo Longo was a native of Latiano.

== Main sights ==
- Castle, or Palazzo Imperiali, built in the 12th century, but rebuilt several times until the current 18th-century appearance
- Mother Church or Santa Maria della Neve, restored in Baroque style in 1778.
- Solise Tower
- Museo del Sottosuolo (Museum of the Underground), founded in 1973

== Twin towns ==
- Pompei, Italy, since 1980
