= Marcello Semeraro =

Italian prelate of the Catholic Church (born 1947)

His Eminence Marcello Semeraro
- Prefect of the Congregation for the Causes of Saints
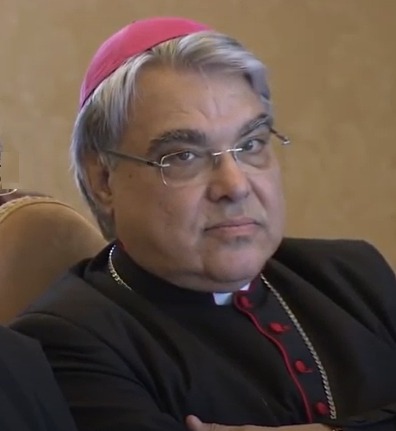
- Semeraro in 2017
- Church: Roman Catholic Church
- See: Santa Maria in Domnica
- Appointed: 15 October 2020
- Predecessor: Giovanni Angelo Becciu
- Other posts: Apostolic Administrator of Santa Maria di Grottaferrata (2013–); Pontifical Delegate for the Italian Basilian Order of Grottaferrata (2016–); Cardinal-Deacon of Santa Maria in Domnica (2020–)
- Previous posts: Bishop of Oria (1998–2004); Bishop of Albano (2004–2020); Secretary of the Council of Cardinals (2013–2020)

Orders
- Ordination: 8 September 1971 by Francesco Minerva
- Consecration: 29 September 1998 by Cosmo Francesco Ruppi
- Created cardinal: 28 November 2020 by Francis
- Rank: Cardinal-Deacon

Personal details
- Born: Marcello Semeraro; 22 December 1947 (age 78) Monteroni di Lecce, Lecce, Italy
- Education: Pontifical Lateran University
- Motto: In spiritu seminare
- Coat of arms

Marcello Semeraro (born 22 December 1947) is an Italian Catholic prelate who has served as prefect of the Dicastery for the Causes of Saints since 2020. He was previously Bishop of Albano and secretary to the College of Cardinals. Pope Francis made him a cardinal in 2020.

== Biography ==
Semeraro was born in Monteroni di Lecce, Province of Lecce, Italy. He was ordained to the priesthood on 8 September 1971. He received his Doctor of Theology degree in 1980 from the Pontifical Lateran University. On 25 July 1998 he was named Bishop of Oria. He was consecrated on 29 September 1998 by Archbishop Cosmo Francesco Ruppi with Archbishops Domenico Caliandro and Donato Negro as co-consecrators.

He taught at the Pontifical Lateran University in 2001. Pope John Paul II chose him as Special Secretary of the 2001 Synod of Bishops, which considered the role of the bishops in contemporary society. That Synod's final statement pointed to social injustice as the root cause of terrorism and decried third world debt and "the enduring drama of hunger and extreme poverty". Semeraro commented: "There is a strong will to dismantle the image of bishops as men of power and to reinstitute the image of bishops as men of service."

On 1 October 2004 he was named Bishop of Albano.

He is a Consultant to the Congregation for the Clergy and the Italian Episcopal Conference (IEC), and a member of the IEC Commission for the Doctrine of the Faith.

On 4 May 2007 he was elected president of the administrative board of the IEC newspaper Avvenire, in place of Cardinal Angelo Bagnasco of Genoa, who had been elected president of the IEC.

In June 2010, he became president of the IEC Commission for the Doctrine of the Faith.

On 13 April 2013 Pope Francis appointed him secretary of the commission of cardinals appointed to advise him on the government of the Church and the organization of the Roman Curia.

On 4 November 2013, Pope Francis appointed him Apostolic Administrator of the Exarchic Monastery and Territorial Abbacy of Saint Mary of Grottaferrata.

In a 2017 interview, Semeraro described the work of the Council of Cardinals: listening, reflecting, and verifying. The Council, he said, listens to the contributions of the Church; reflects on those contributions, and looks into the details of them, considering the best way of going forward. It then makes proposals to the Pope; as Semeraro explained, the Council has a consultative role.

On 15 October 2020, Pope Francis appointed him Prefect of the Congregation for the Causes of Saints.

On 25 October 2020, Pope Francis announced he would raise him to the rank of cardinal at a consistory scheduled for 28 November 2020. At that consistory, Francis made him Cardinal-Deacon of Santa Maria in Domnica. On 16 December he was named a member of the Congregation for Oriental Churches and the Dicastery for Communications.

He participated as a cardinal elector in the 2025 papal conclave that elected Pope Leo XIV.

== Works ==
- (in Italian) Mistero, comunione e missione - Manuale di ecclesiologia (Bologna, 2004)
- (in Italian) Dalla Parte del Padre (Libreria Editrice Vaticana, 2010)

== See also ==
- Cardinals created by Pope Francis

Catholic Church titles
Preceded by Armando Franco	Bishop of Oria; 25 July 1998 – 1 October 2004	Succeeded by Michele Castoro
Preceded by Agostino Vallini	Bishop of Albano Laziale; 1 October 2004 – 15 October 2020	Succeeded by Vincenzo Viva
Preceded by Giovanni Angelo Becciu	Prefect of the Congregation for the Causes of Saints; 15 October 2020 – present	Incumbent
Preceded by William Joseph Levada	Cardinal-Deacon of Santa Maria in Domnica; 28 November 2020 – present	Incumbent
