= Francesca Forleo-Brayda =

Francesca Forleo Braida (Francavilla Fontana, 18 January 1779 – 2 June 1820) was a Neapolitan artist. She was born in Francavilla Fontana, at that time in the Kingdom of Naples, now in the Province of Brindisi, in Apulia.

== Biography ==
Francesca Forleo-Brayda was born on 18 January 1779 in Francavilla Fontana, into a family of the local minor nobility. A daughter of Domenico Forleo and his wife Donata Brajda, she was the youngest of their children and grew up in an intellectually stimulating environment, encouraged by her uncle Onofrio Forleo to study fine arts, literature, and history, from a young age.

A pupil of Ludovico Delli Guanti, a painter influenced by the Solimena school, and of the Franciscan friar Bonaventura Padula in the humanities, from an early age Francesca showed a strong talent for painting. She made her début at just sixteen years old with a series of twelve sacred-themed paintings on wood. In 1796, at the age of seventeen, she signed one of her earliest public works, an oval painting of Maria Santissima della Fontana for the sacristy of the main church of Francavilla Fontana, bearing the inscription: F.F.B. pinxit pro sua devotione an. 1796.

Forleo-Brayda produced religious, historical, and mythological subjects, distinguishing herself with her refined, sensitive, and highly narrative style. Among her works are Cleopatra, Diana the Huntress, Clorinda on Horseback, as well as evangelical and hagiographic scenes such as The Dying Christ on the Cross, The Death of Saint Francis Xavier, Saint Agatha, Queen of Martyrs, and The Angels of Forgiveness.

=== Last years ===
Around 1810 Forleo-Brayda began to suffer from a debilitating form of arthritis, which forced her to move to the family estate (Masseria Forleo Superiore). Despite her limited mobility, she continued to paint, holding the brush between her contracted fingers. During this period, she devoted herself intensely to depicting rural and popular life, creating genre paintings rich in social and anthropological observation.

Among Forleo-Brayda's best known works are: The Dance of the Tarantata, Harvesters’ Meal, Moonlight Serenade, The Cauldron at the Spring, The Girl Holding a Lamb, The Bathers’ Surprise, The Game of Morra, and The Octave of Gualano.

In 1818, the sudden death of her father—who fell ill while witnessing the execution of brigands in the town centre—further worsened the artist’s already fragile health. Despite her suffering, Forleo-Brayda continued to paint until the end. She died on 2 June 1820, reportedly due to poisoning from a poorly prepared drink supplied by a pharmacy, according to the account of her biographer, Nicola Argentina.

== Works held ==
Francesca Forleo-Brayda left an important artistic legacy, with works that can still be seen today in public places in Francavilla Fontana.

- Minor Basilica of the Most Holy Rosary: in the Chapter Room, a wooden cabinet crafted by the cabinetmaker Giuseppe Formosi is adorned on its frame with five small oval paintings painted in 1796 by the artist. These depict The Baptism of Christ, The Beheading of Saint James the Greater, The Liberation of the Apostle Peter from Prison, The Sacred Heart of Jesus, and The Finding of Maria Santissima della Fontana.
- Castello Imperiali: two paintings by Forleo-Brayda are on display in the Mogavero Room, and constitute part of the artistic heritage of the castle.

== Dedications ==
In 2019, the Municipality of Francavilla Fontana dedicated to Francesca Forleo-Brayda: a city street, although without the designation of "painter", and a public park

== Quotations ==
The historian Pietro Palumbo, is said to have described the artist’s work as follows:

"Francesca Forleo-Brayda represented and reflected the eighteenth century in all its folds and minutiae. She foreshadowed modern times, demonstrating that true nobility does not lie in apathy and idleness, but in the accomplishment of noble deeds and in work."
