= Francavilla Fontana =

Francavilla Fontana Francaìdda (Sicilian)
- Comune
- Comune di Francavilla Fontana
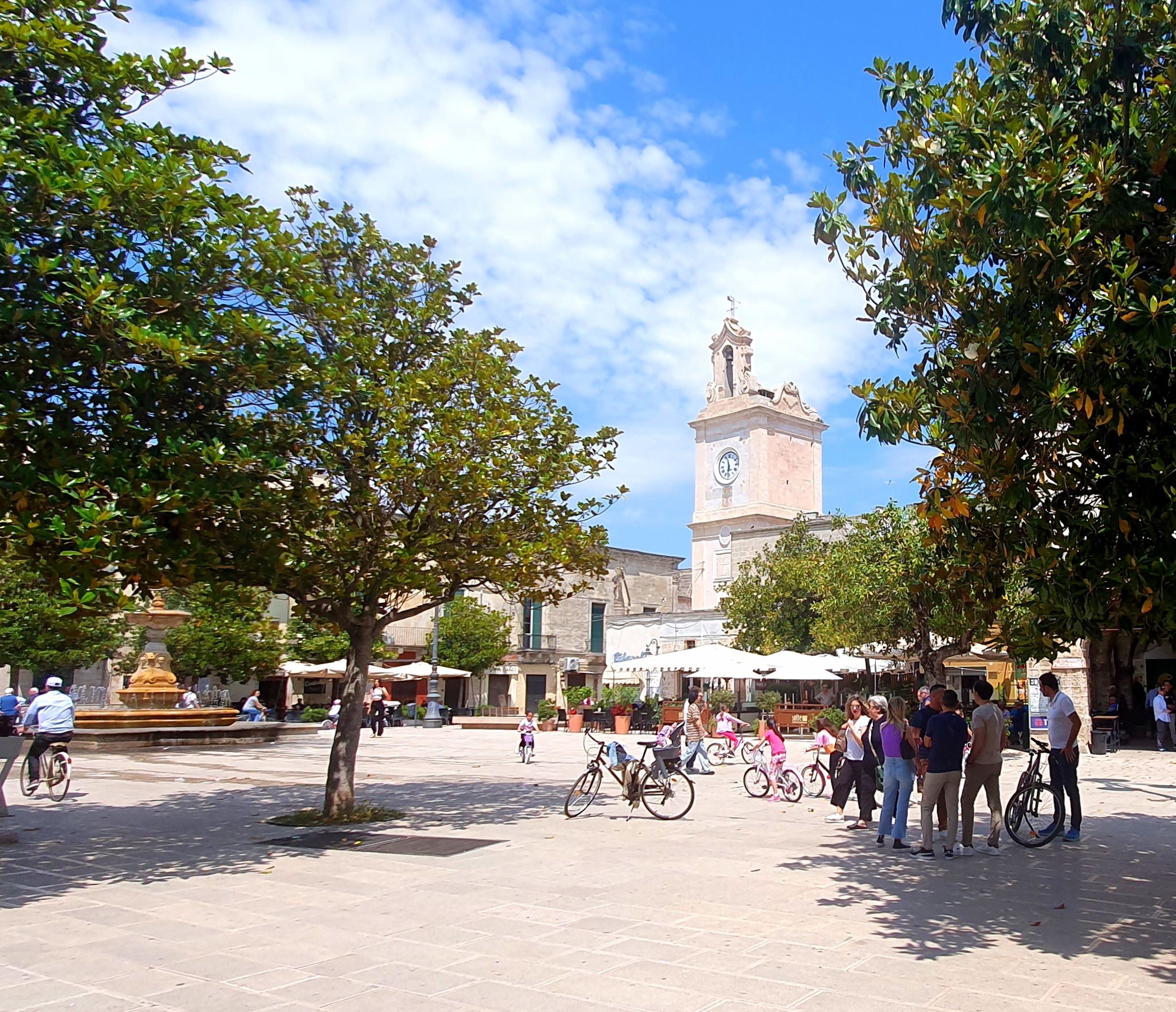
- View of the "Umberto I" square

- Francavilla within the Province of Brindisi

- Location within Italy Location within Apulia
- Coordinates: 40°32′N 17°35′E
- Country: Italy
- Region: Apulia
- Province: Brindisi (BR)
- Frazioni: Bax Capece

Government
  - Mayor: Antonello Denuzzo

Area
  - Total: 175 km^{2} (68 sq mi)
- Elevation: 142 m (466 ft)

Population (31 December 2017)
  - Total: 36,358
  - Density: 208/km^{2} (538/sq mi)
- Demonym: Francavillesi
- Time zone: UTC+1 (CET)
  - Summer (DST): UTC+2 (CEST)
- Postal code: 72021
- Dialing code: 0831
- Patron saint: Madonna della Fontana
- Saint day: September 14
- Website: Official website

Francavilla Fontana (Francavillese: Francaìdda Salentino pronunciation: [fɾaŋkaˈiɖɖa]) is a town and comune (municipality) in the Province of Brindisi, in the region of Apulia, southern Italy. It is also known as the "Town of the Imperiali" (Città degli Imperiali), referring to the Imperiali family, a noble lineage of feudal lords who ruled the area from the late 16th century until the 18th century.

As of 2017, Francavilla Fontana had a population of 36,358, making it the third most populous municipality in the province, after Brindisi and Fasano.

== History ==
The name Francavilla has French-Norman origins: "Franca" (tax-free) and "villa" (town). The specification Fontana ("fountain") alludes to a vision of the Virgin Mary witnessed by Prince Filippo d'Angiò, who hence declaring the town a tax-free haven, according to the local legend.

== Geography ==
Francavilla is located in the Altosalento, on the last Murge's hills, and it is equidistant, about 35 kilometres (22 mi), from Taranto and Brindisi. The municipality borders with Ceglie Messapica, Grottaglie, Latiano, Manduria, Oria, San Marzano di San Giuseppe, San Michele Salentino, San Vito dei Normanni, Sava and Villa Castelli.

== Main sights ==
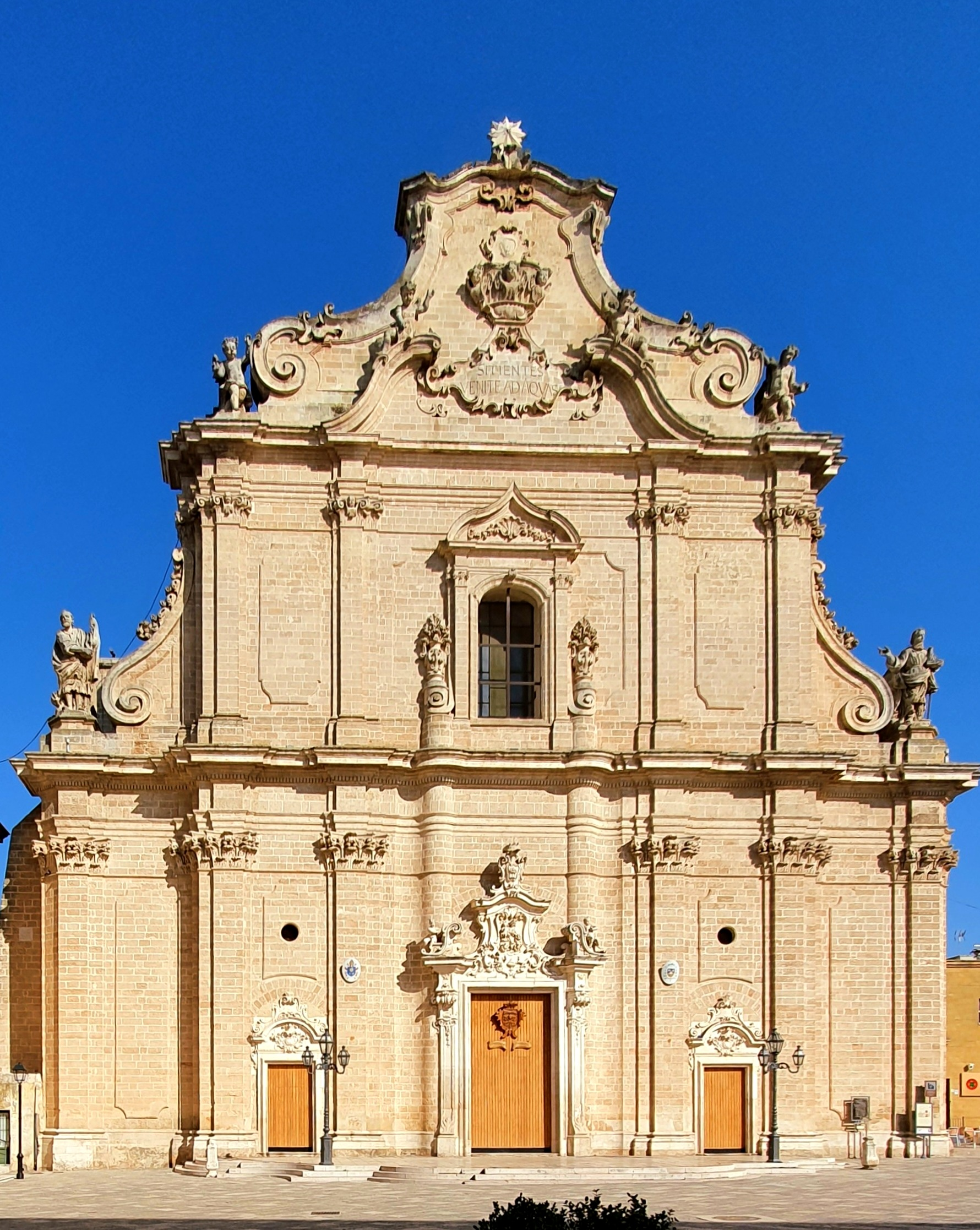
Francavilla Cathedral.

- Minor Basilica of the Most Holy Rosary – A prominent religious structure in the heart of the town, known for its richly decorated Baroque façade and interior artworks. Constructed beginning in 1743 on the site of a previous medieval church built during the Angevin rule. It features Baroque architectural elements and serves as a major religious site in the city.
- Palazzo Imperiali – A massive square-shaped castle that served as the residence of the Imperiali family, who ruled the town from the late 16th century. The building was acquired, along with the nearby town of Oria, from Saint Charles Borromeo in the 16th century for 40,000 ounces of gold. According to tradition, Borromeo distributed the entire sum in a single day to aid the poor and those afflicted by plague in Milan.
- Torre dell'Orologio (Clock Tower) – Built in 1750, this watchtower with a functioning clock is a local landmark and a symbol of civic pride.

== Transport ==
The town, 18 km east of Taranto-Grottaglie Airport, is served by the SS7 "Appia" highway. The local railway station is a junction point between the lines Taranto–Brindisi, owned by the national company FS, and Martina–Lecce, owned by FSE. It is served by regional and, on the Taranto-Brindisi line, by long-distance trains also.

== Sport ==
The local football club is the Virtus Francavilla, that has its home ground in John Paul II Stadium.

== People ==
- Ottaviano Andriani (b. 1974), marathon runner
- Cosimo Caliandro (1982–2011), middle-distance runner
- Clementina Forleo (b. 1963), judge
- Francesca Forleo-Brayda, painter
- Giuseppe Renato Imperiali (1651–1737), cardinal
- Michele Imperiali Simeana (1736–1782), prince
- Giacomo Leone (b. 1971), long-distance runner
- Francesco Ribezzo (b. 8 May 1875, died Lecce, 19 October 1952), glottologist - the science of tongues or languages; comparative philology, particularly the dialect of F. Fontana

== Twin towns ==
- San Giovanni al Natisone, Italy
