= Raffaele de Palma =

Roman Catholic prelate

Most Reverend Raffaele de Palma
- Bishop of Oria
- Church: Catholic Church
- Diocese: Diocese of Oria
- Predecessor: Marco Antonio Parisi
- Successor: Carlo Cuzzolini

Orders
- Consecration: 24 February 1650 by Francesco Maria Brancaccio

Personal details
- Died: 5 March 1674 Oria, Italy

Raffaele de Palma, O.F.M. Conv. (died 1674) was a Roman Catholic prelate who served as Bishop of Oria (1650–1674).

== Biography ==
Raffaele de Palma was ordained a priest in the Order of Friars Minor Conventual. On 14 February 1650, he was appointed during the papacy of Pope Innocent X as Bishop of Oria. On 24 February 1650, he was consecrated bishop by Francesco Maria Brancaccio, Bishop of Viterbo e Tuscania. He served as Bishop of Oria until his death on 5 March 1674.

Catholic Church titles
Preceded by Marco Antonio Parisi	Bishop of Oria; 1650–1674	Succeeded by Carlo Cuzzolini
