= Minor Basilica of the Most Holy Rosary =

Minor basilica in Francavilla Fontana, Italy

- Basilica minore del Santissimo Rosario
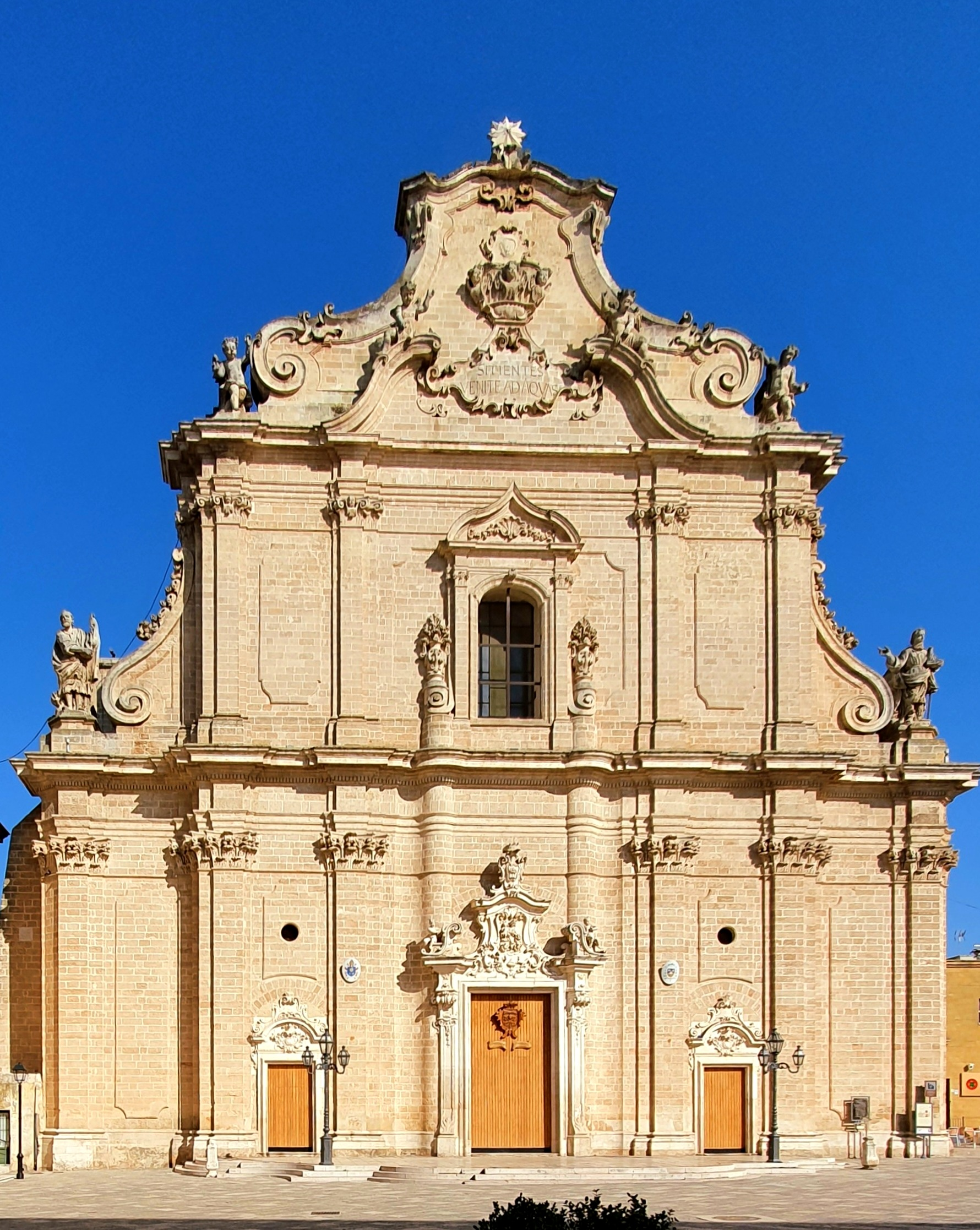
- Facade of the Collegiate Church of the Most Holy Rosary

- 40.532172°N 17.582107°E
- Location: Francavilla Fontana, Apulia, Italy
- Denomination: Catholic

History
- Dedication: Our Lady of the Rosary
- Consecrated: 1572

Architecture
- Style: Baroque
- Groundbreaking: 1743
- Completed: 1759

Administration
- Diocese: Diocese of Oria

The Collegiate Basilica of the Most Holy Rosary, also known as the Matrix Church or Cathedral (Italian: Basilica minore del Santissimo Rosario) is a Catholic Minor Basilica located in Francavilla Fontana, an Italian municipality in the province of Brindisi in Apulia. It is the largest church in the Diocese of Oria, of which it is part, and has the highest dome in Salento, with a diameter of 13 meters.

The present building is the result of reconstruction in 1743, after an earthquake had destroyed much of the church built in the 14th century at the behest of Philip I of Taranto.

== History ==
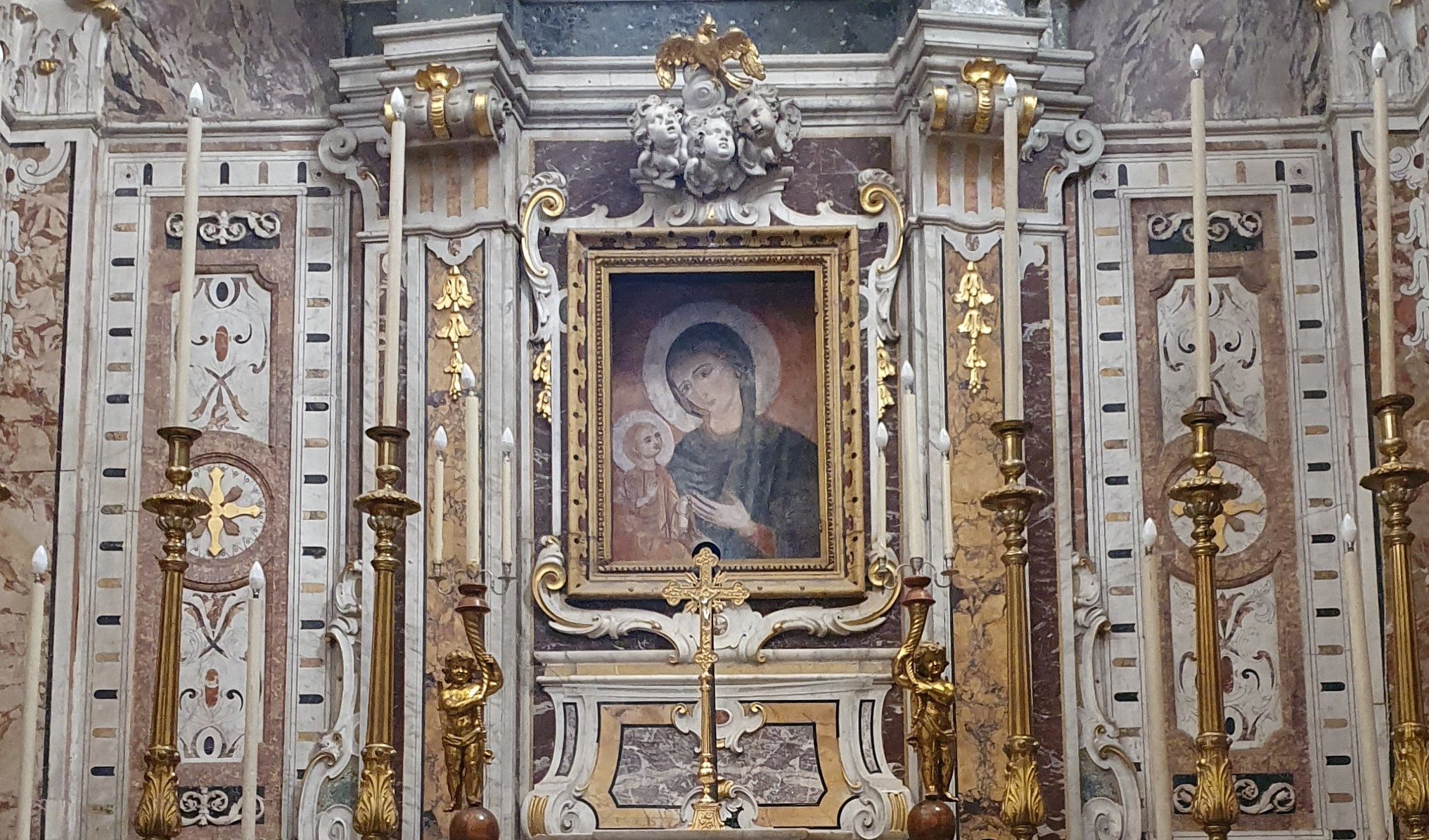
Byzantine icon of the Madonna and Child

=== The first construction ===
The origin of the church, according to tradition, is linked to the discovery, near a spring close to Casale di San Salvatore, of a Byzantine icon depicting the image of Our Lady, which took place on September 14, 1310 by the prince of Taranto, Philip I of Taranto. Immediately after the discovery of the sacred image, the prince ordered that a church be built around that site in which the icon would be preserved.

However, among the various local historians who speak of the church's origin, Caesar Theophilatus claimed that as early as around 1300 there was a church dedicated to St. Mary of Francavilla on that site, which must have been of Greek rite and with a parish function distinct from the other parishes in the area. He also claimed that baptismal rites took place in an immersive manner, as attested by the font for the baptism of children placed in the atrium of the Imperiali Castle.

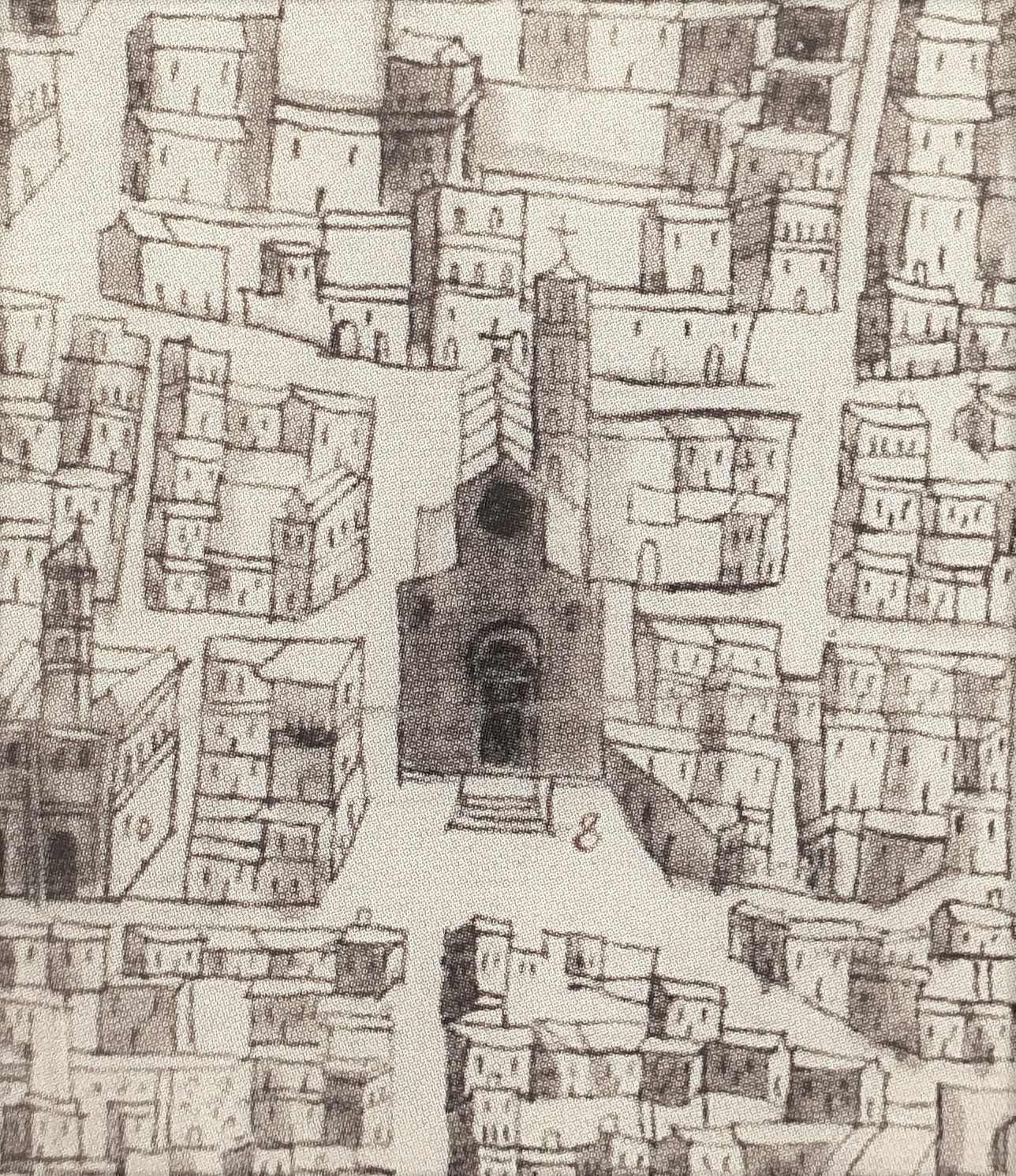
Drawing dated 1643, depicting the church of Angevin origin

Around 1510 the church was enlarged, and at that time the main door was located between the present niches of St. Lawrence and St. Joseph and stretched as far as the altar of St. Anne, where, surrounded by a gate, the wall on which the painting stood was preserved. It was not until 1552 that Domenico di Brindisi and Stefano Salinaro were commissioned to build a chapel to house the Marian icon, adorned with various sculptures and enclosed by an iron gate. Further improvements were made in 1560, and so the new building was consecrated on February 24, 1572, by Monsignor Figuerroa, bishop of Brindisi and Oria.

In 1613 a new chapel was built to place the icon, which until then had been on a wooden altar surrounded by iron gates; other improvements were made in 1615.

=== Reconstruction after the earthquake ===
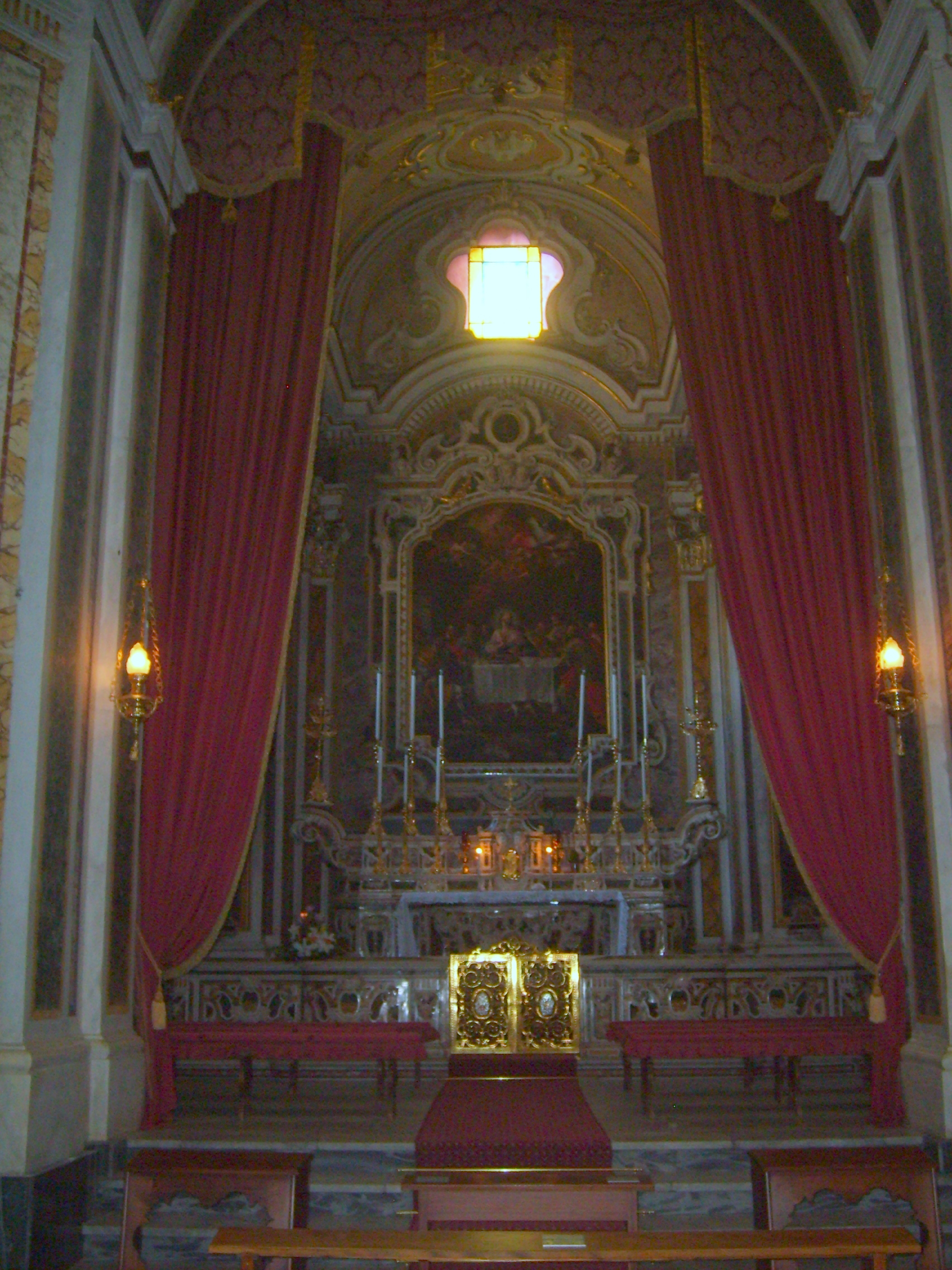
Chapel of the Blessed Sacrament

The 1743 earthquake severely damaged the structure, and so instead of repairing it, it was preferred to be rebuilt. The entire population participated in the expenses for its reconstruction, from the prince, who offered more than half of the sum needed, to the University (the officials gave up their salaries), the Collegiate Chapter, and the people with their alms.

To solve the problems concerning the construction of the church, a special commission was appointed, which supervised the work that lasted from 1743 to 1759, and which, with the help of the architect Mauro Manieri and Prince Michele Imperiali, chose, among all those presented, a project that came from Rome.

The building site was directed for a year by Mauro Manieri and, after his death, by Friar Benedetto of the Pious Schools and Giuseppe di Lauro of Manduria.

On August 15, 1743, Michele Imperiali and his wife laid the first stone of the new mother church. As a symbolic gesture, a box of lead was inserted into the brick containing a coin depicting Benedict XII, a medal of Our Lady of the Fountain and a jar of oil. In 1759 the new church, although not fully completed, was inaugurated (a plaque placed on the right wall of the presbytery also testifies to this).

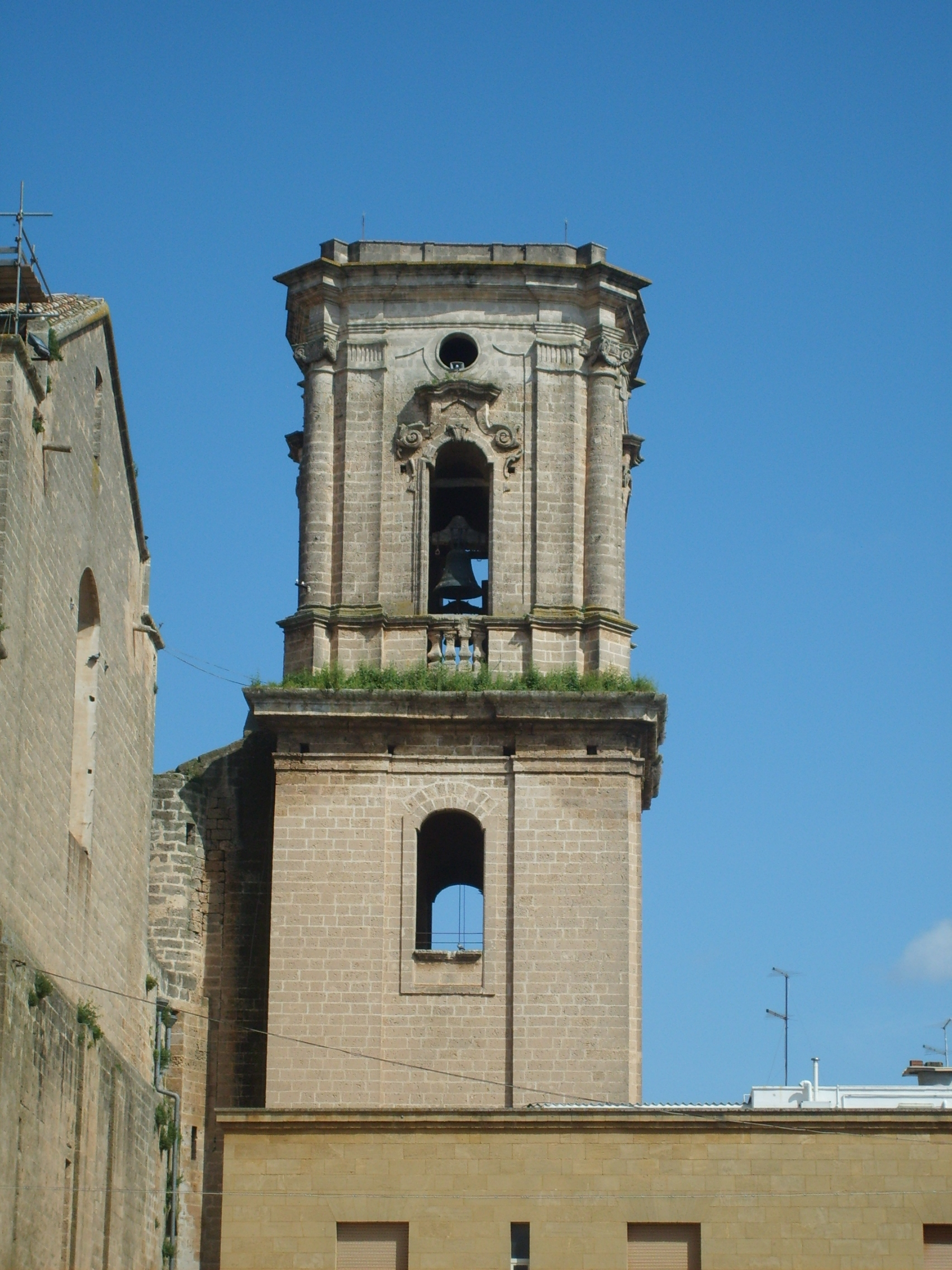
Church bell tower

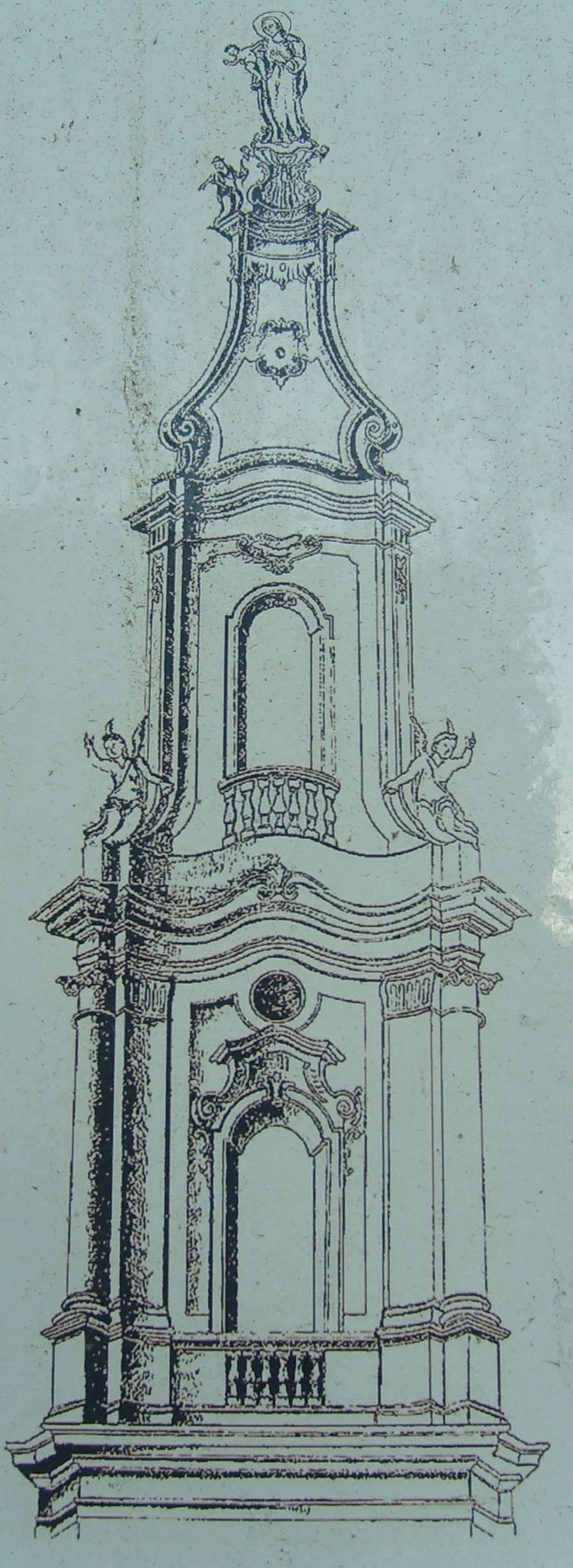
Initial design

In 1764 the Chapter submitted a request to the University (Note: The term University refers to the ancient Universitas, or municipalities in southern Italy, administered by an assembly of public officials elected by the people in varying numbers depending on the number of inhabitants in the city.) for the material left over from the construction of the church to be used in a new sacristy and for the bell tower. Despite the University's consent, the plans were not realized in a short time: from 1778 to 1784 the sacristy was built, while the bell tower was not started until 1791 (at the University's expense, not the Chapter's), following Manieri's original design, and was never completed, except in recent years, in the final part.

Once the building was finished, a dispute arose between the Chapter and the University because both claimed "jus patronatus." In 1792, following a meeting between the then bishop of Oria, the mayor and deputies of the Chapter, the University decided to provide only for material needs, giving up spiritual problems.

In 1842 the church was reconfirmed as Collegiate.

In 1864, due to another earthquake that had damaged its left side, the church needed consolidation work consisting of the construction of five barbicans, two at the arches of the Baptistery and Addolorata chapels and one at the end of the Blessed Sacrament chapel.

For several years the church was undergoing complete conservative restoration (dome, facade, exterior and interior). The work was then completed in 2012.

On April 8, 2012, the church was proclaimed a minor basilica thanks to the valuable cooperation of Vincenzo Pisanello, bishop of the diocese of Oria, upon the benevolence of Pope Benedict XVI, and officially elevated on Oct. 7, 2012, precisely on the feast of Our Lady of the Rosary, titular of the Basilica, in a celebration presided over by the bishop of Oria.

In the same year, in September, changes were made to the exterior and interior of the Basilica: the marble ambon and the pontifical and diocesan coats of arms. As of Oct. 26, 2020, the Basilica was closed for the continuation of interior work, more specifically the interior of the dome, with a modification of the electrical system inside and a considerable restoration to its interior, and the restoration of the transept of the majestic Church. On May 16, 2021 with a Eucharistic Celebration presided over by the Diocesan Bishop, it was reopened for worship.

== Description ==
=== The Angevin church ===
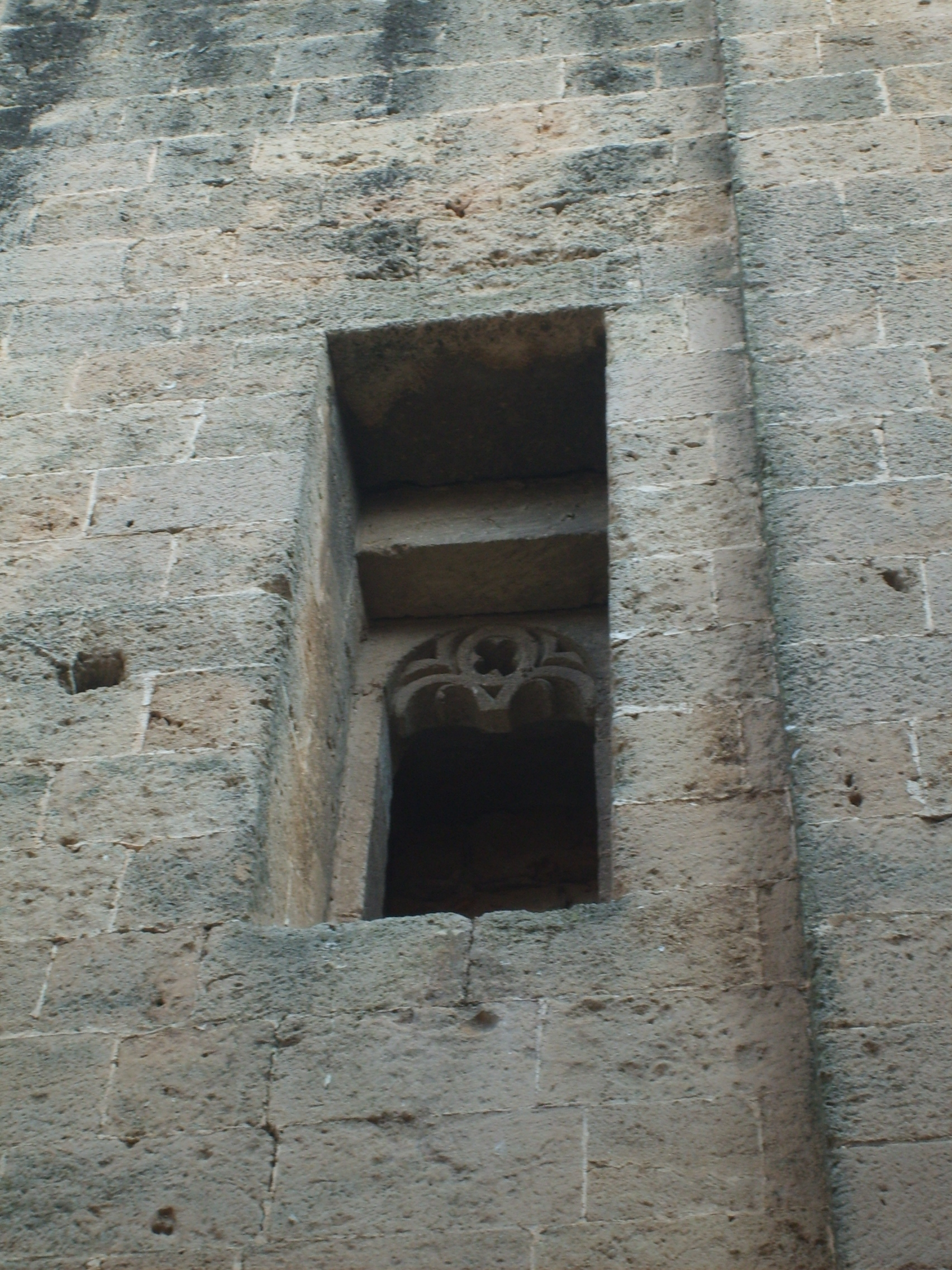
One of the two surviving single-lancet windows of the medieval church

There are some discrepancies on the appearance of the Angevin church: according to the map of the city dating back to 1643 and drawn by the sculptor Carlo Francesco Centonze of Francavilla, the building had the appearance of a Romanesque church; on the other hand, according to the map of the abbot Giovan Battista Pacichelli (contained in the work Il Regno di Napoli in prospettiva), the church was built in an austere and elegant Gothic style.

The facade, despite the various restorations it underwent over the years, still retained a large rose window above the front door, the mullioned windows of the side walls, and the towering bell tower, ending in four soaring spires. The ancient church, dating from the period 1310-20, originally had nine altars, four to the right and four to the left of the high altar, dedicated to Our Lady of the Fountain, behind which was the grotto, girded with iron gratings, where the Byzantine fresco discovered by the prince of Taranto was placed. The side chapels, according to ancient documents, were, starting from the right: that of the Venerable, in which was placed a crystal tabernacle of the Blessed Sacrament, of St. Peter the Apostle, of St. Cataldo, and of the Holy Cross of Jerusalem, in which a large relic enclosing a fragment of Christ's cross was venerated. From the left, on the other hand, were the altar of St. Anthony the Abbot, of St. Francis of Paola, of Our Lady of Graces, and of St. Andrew.

=== The 18th-century church ===
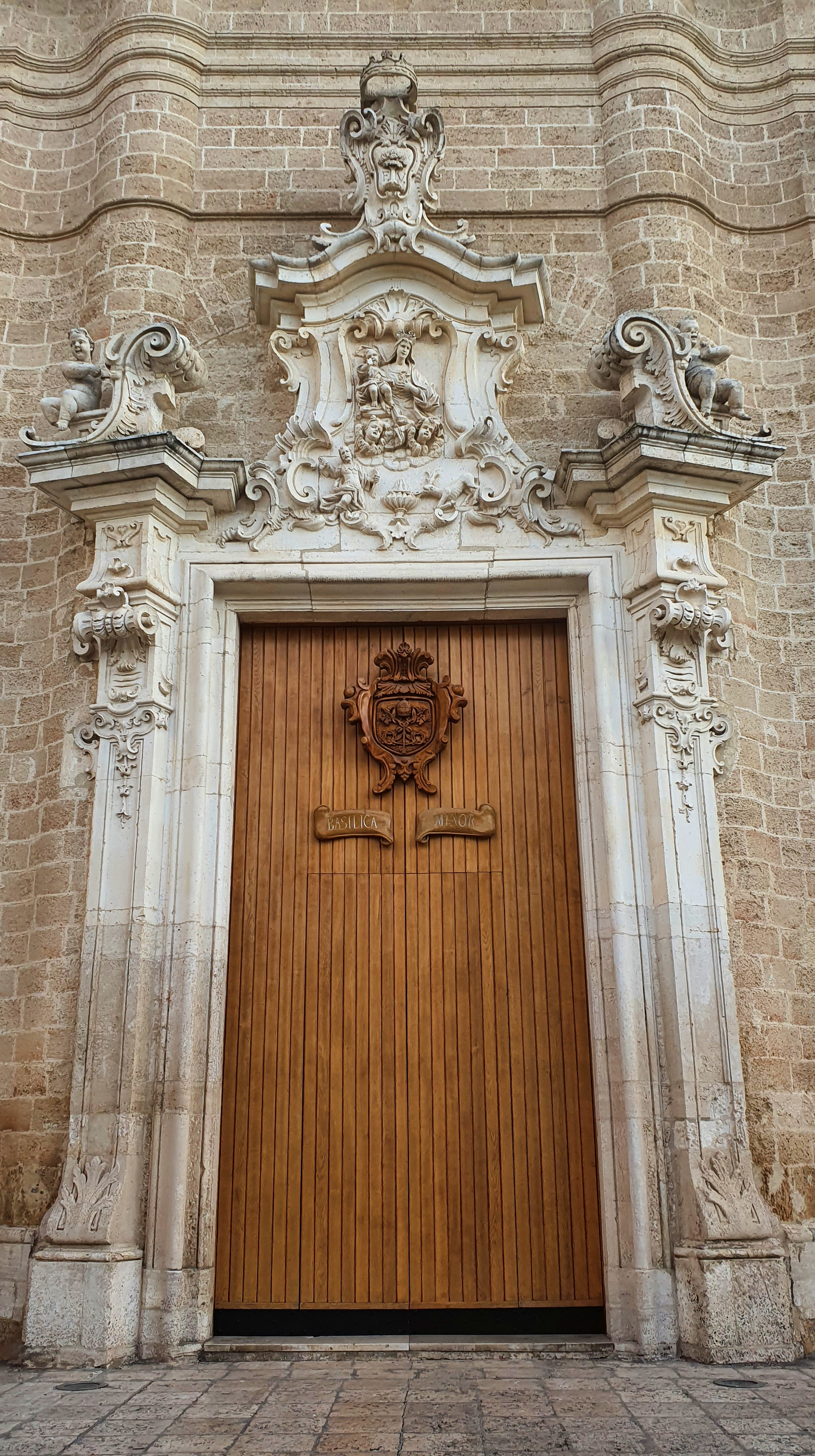
Central portal of the Basilica

==== External architecture ====
In some respects, the structure of the facade is similar to the churches of the Gesù and of St. Ignatius, both located in Rome. The movement of the lesenes, combined with Corinthian capitals, creates a "plastic-pictorial" effect, giving the facade a wave-like pattern. In general, the design of the facade shows numerous affinities with the various designs executed by Vignola, Borromini and Barigioni, making it more similar to Roman Baroque churches than churches in neighboring towns, which were instead influenced more distinctly by the Lecce Baroque.

The interior is accessed through three doors: the two side ones, surmounted by mixtilinear tympanums, have a simple line, hemmed by roundels, to which they are joined with a curled volute. The central portal has a more complex structure and is rich in ornamental elements: it is enclosed by half-pillars incorporated into the wall, ornamented with acanthus leaves. The front of the pilasters is occupied by delicate encarpuses that also continue on the side walls and the entablature section. These support striped and projecting cornices, on which two large volutes rest, which in turn support two putti, arranged obliquely so as to emphasize the movement of the volutes. In the lunette, carved from a broken tympanum, on the central part of which rests a shield depicting the civic coat of arms, the image of Our Lady of the Fountain is inserted in a tangle of decorative elements. This concentration of elements contributes to giving greater vertical momentum to the central body. Ending the lower order is an empty entablature, which concludes with a projecting cornice, adorned with dentils, which with its Greek motif accentuates the horizontal partitions without sacrificing the vertical ones. On a base, which symmetrically resumes the lower order, the upper one is set, divided into three fields by the usual pilasters adorned with composite capitals reminiscent of Borromini.

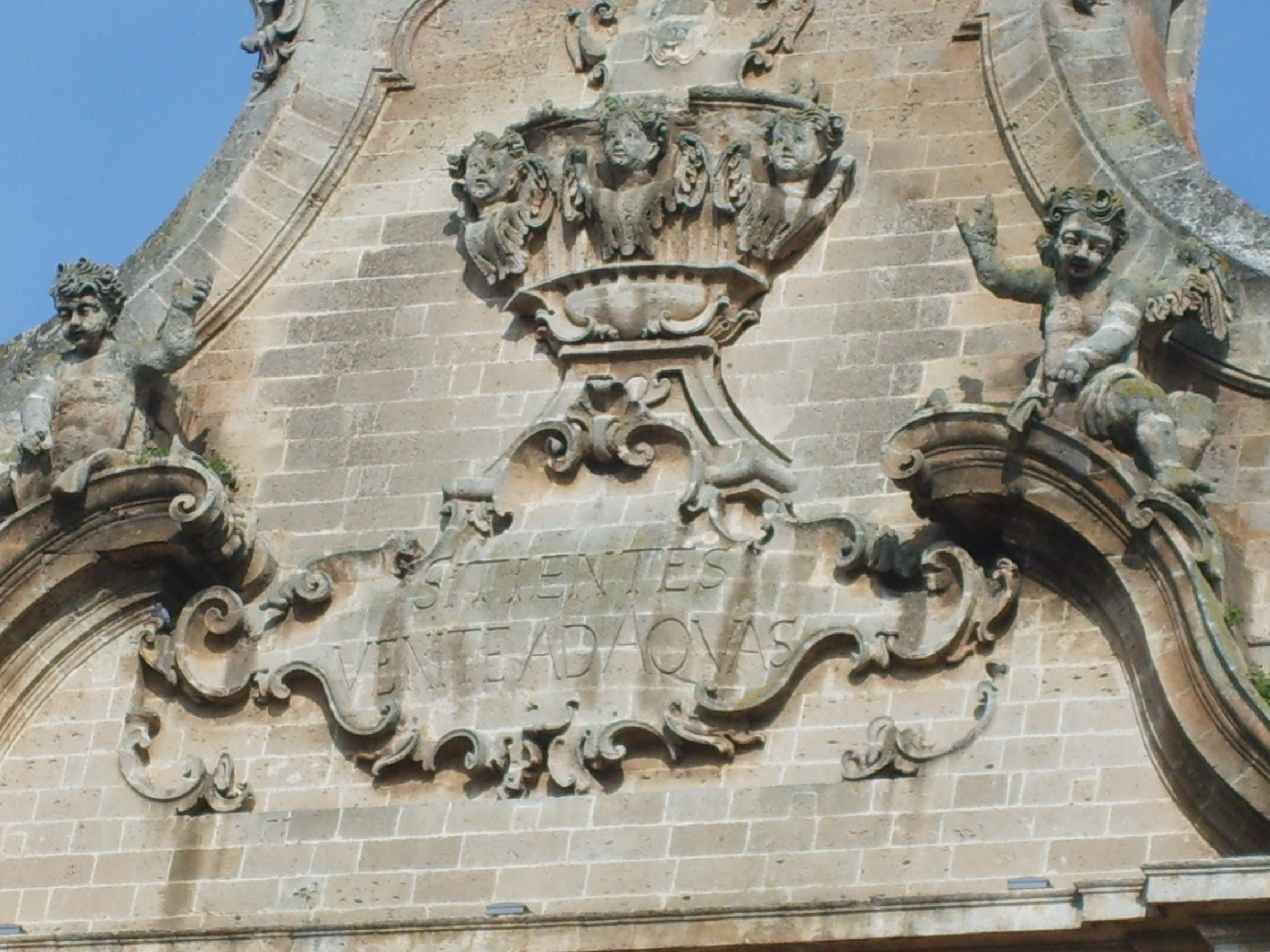
Cartouche on the facade

On the extreme sides, placed on plinths next to the volutes joining the two orders, are statues of the apostles Peter and Paul. There is also another entablature on the facade that borders the second order and houses a cartouche on which the following motto stands out:

SITIENTES
VENITE AD AQVAS
All you who are thirsty,
come to the waters

The entire facade, by its continuous reference to Roman cultural canons, would mark a decisive moment in the turning point of the Salento architectural tradition, clearly influencing the cathedrals of Oria and Martina Franca.

==== The dome ====
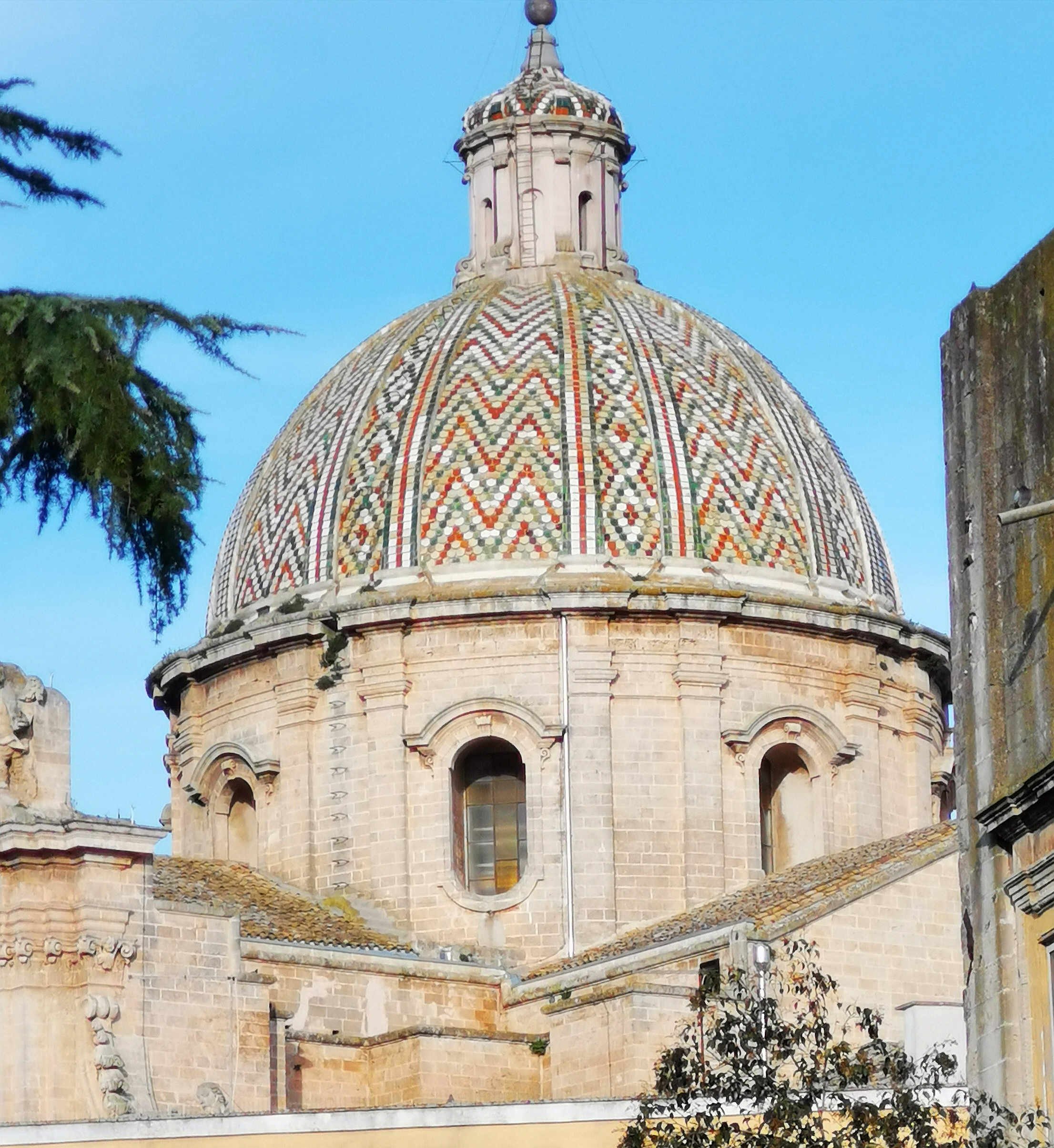
View of the dome

The dome is the tallest in Salento, and ends with a soaring lantern. It is clad on the outside with polychrome maiolica tiles, echoing the Neapolitan decorative technique. With a circular base, it is set on a high drum punctuated by double pilasters, where eight large windows face each other. Inside the drum decorative motifs accentuate the architectural lines. In 2006 it underwent a conservative restoration and static consolidation.

==== Internal architecture ====
Interior plan of the collegiate church

The church has a domed central layout, with three naves and a Greek cross plan extended into the apse. This structural model is to be considered a rare example in 17th and 18th-century Salentine churches, almost all of which were laid out in the shape of a Latin cross.

Four large pillars, consisting of paired pilasters, lighten the mass, delimit the side chapels of the nave and support arches and spandrels that set the dome. The same arrangement of round-arched pillars, isolating the chapels in the side aisles, highlights the central apparatus.

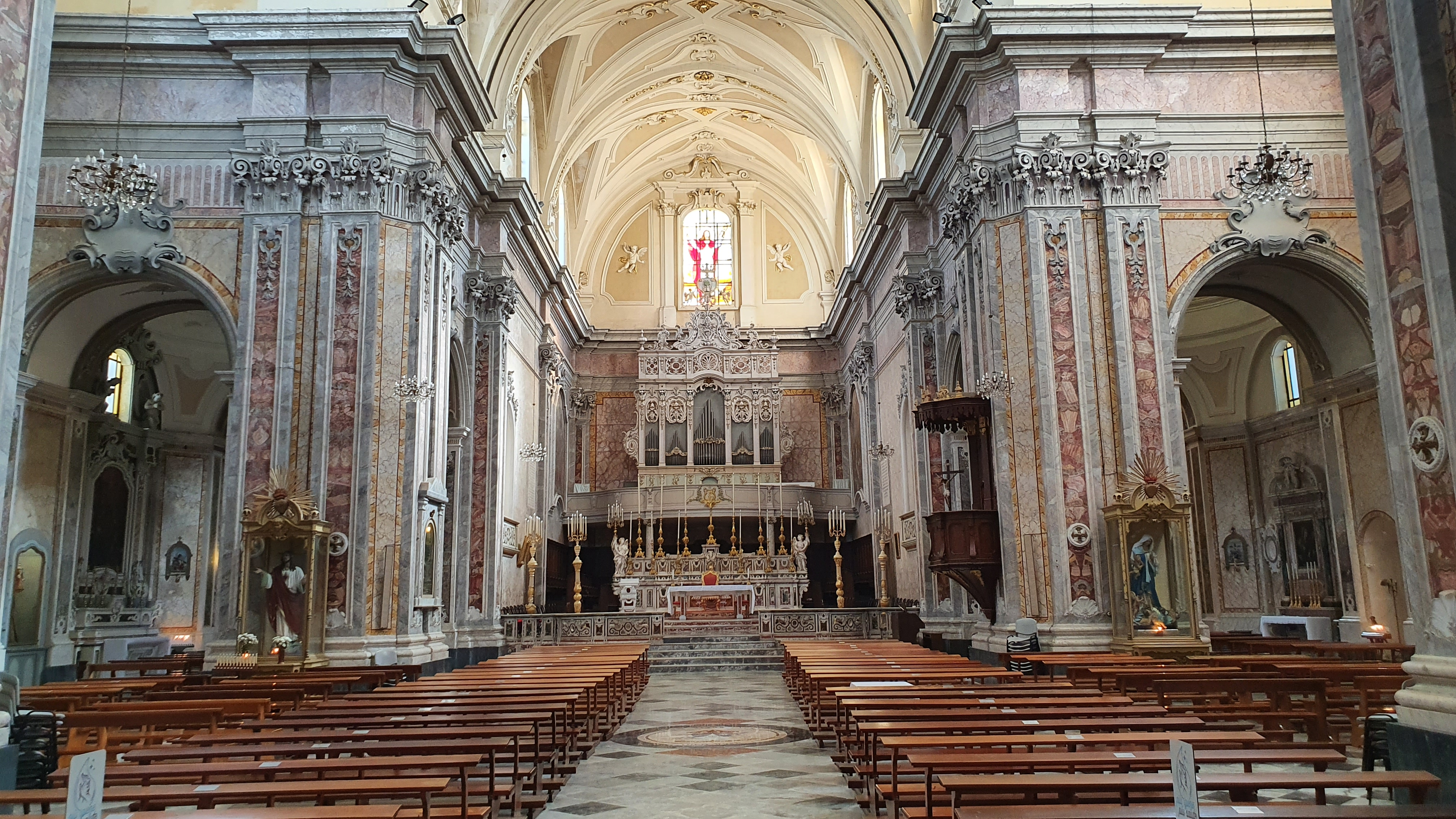
Central nave

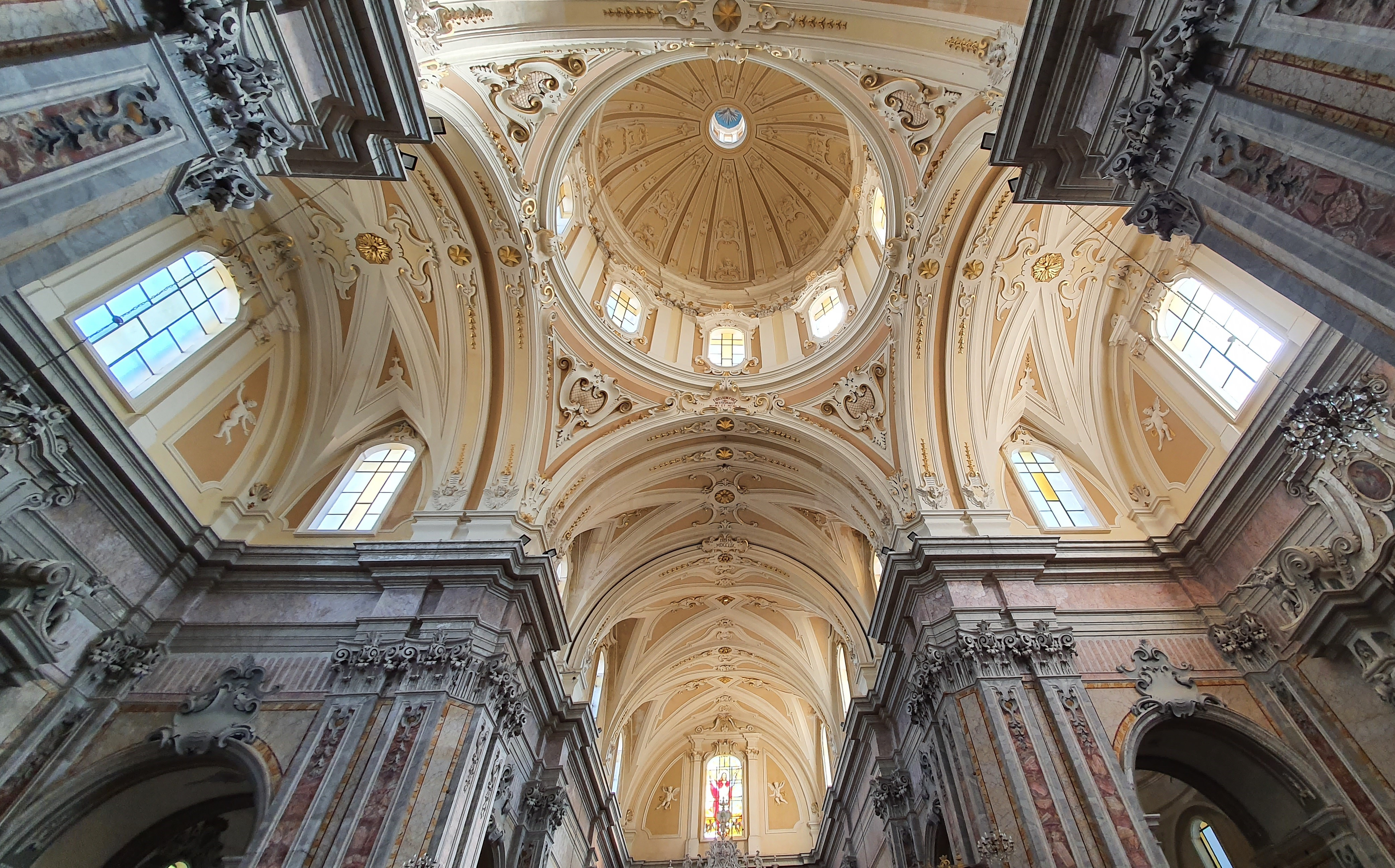
Transept and dome

The two side chapels, placed after the entrance and dedicated to St. Joseph and the Purgatory Souls (the one on the right) and St. Roch (the one on the left), are enlarged with apse areas, in which the altar of St. Joseph and the baptismal font, made in 1864, are arranged, respectively. The chapels of St. Anne (moved from the Castle in 1910) and of Our Lady of Sorrows have the same shape as the previous ones and end with the entrance to the chapels of Our Lady of the Fountain and of the Blessed Sacrament, raised three steps above the side aisles. They have a rectangular floor plan with the altar set away from the wall, on which, in the chapel of the Fountain, the ancient icon of the Virgin and Child has been placed.

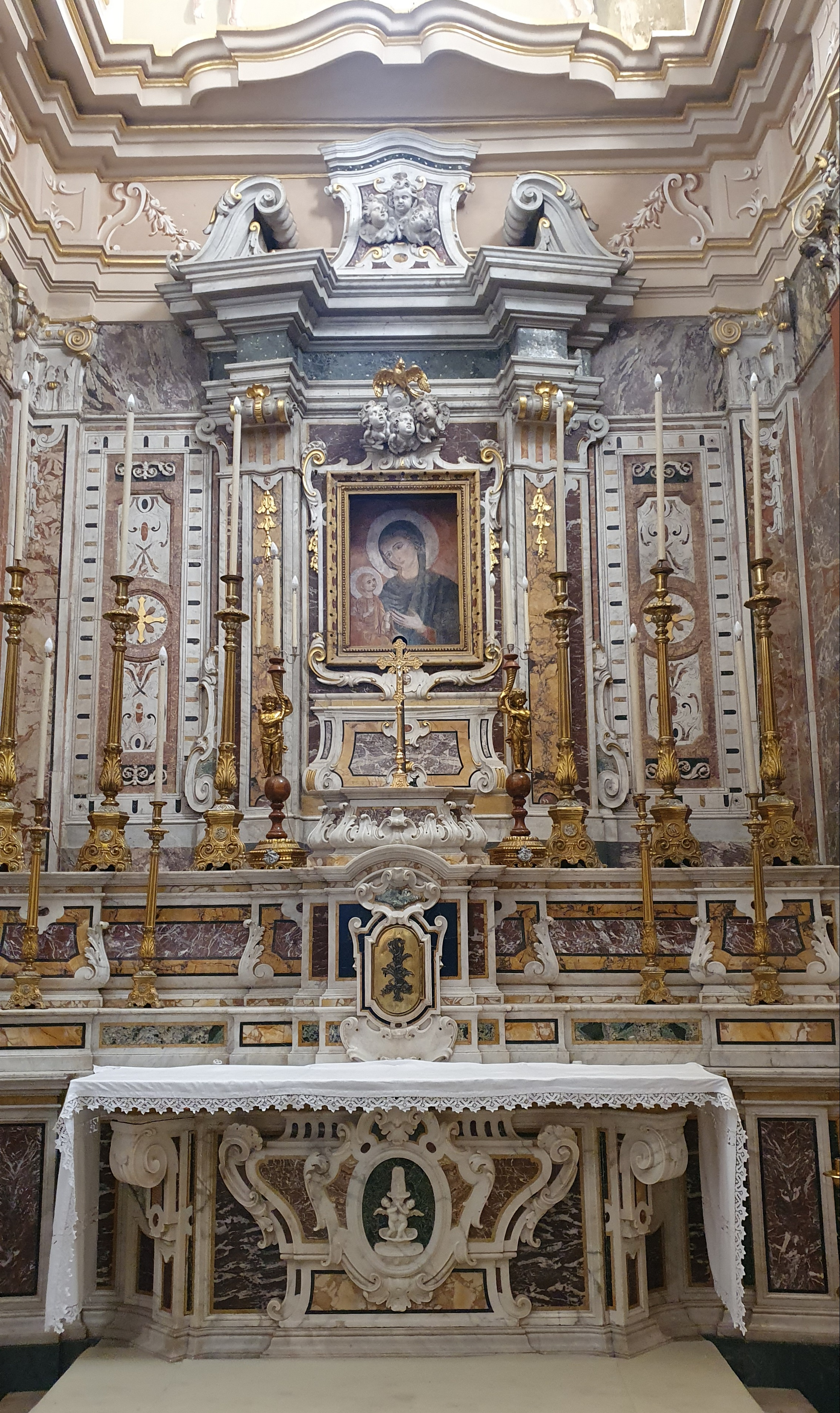
Altar of Our Lady of the Fountain

The altar of the Madonna was commissioned in 1773 to the Neapolitan master marble worker Domenico Tucci (who had already created the marble prospectus in the chapel of San Cataldo in 1771) who was offered a fee of 1140 ducats. The altar's model both in marble and in less valuable materials would be reused in many other churches.

The high altar (decorated on the sides by two angels with cornucopia), on the other hand, together with the marble balustrade, comes from the old church of St. Francis of Assisi, located on the site where the church dedicated to St. Alphonsus Liguori stands today. Behind the altar are the wooden choir and the organ, the latter placed on a mezzanine supported by columns and dating back to the 20th century.

==== The chapter house ====
Another wooden choir is placed in the chapter house. Also in this hall is a valuable cabinet, also made of wood, inlaid in the stalls, made together with the counter placed in the center of the hall by cabinetmaker Giuseppe Formosi. The cabinet is decorated on the cymatium by five ovalets painted in 1796 by the painter Forleo-Brayda, depicting the Baptism of Christ, the Beheading of St. James the Greater, the Apostle Peter freed from prison, the Heart of Jesus and the Finding of Mary Most Holy of the Fountain.

Above the cabinet are paintings depicting the Seven Sacraments, the large painting of Our Lady of the Rosary (by Domenico Carella), portraits of Cardinal Giuseppe Renato Imperiali, his nephew Cardinal Francesco Spinelli, St. Charles Borromeo and two ovals of St. Irene and the Immaculate Conception.

In the anti-sacristy, on the other hand, is another valuable painting depicting Our Lady of the Rosary, by an unknown author.

=== Interior decoration ===
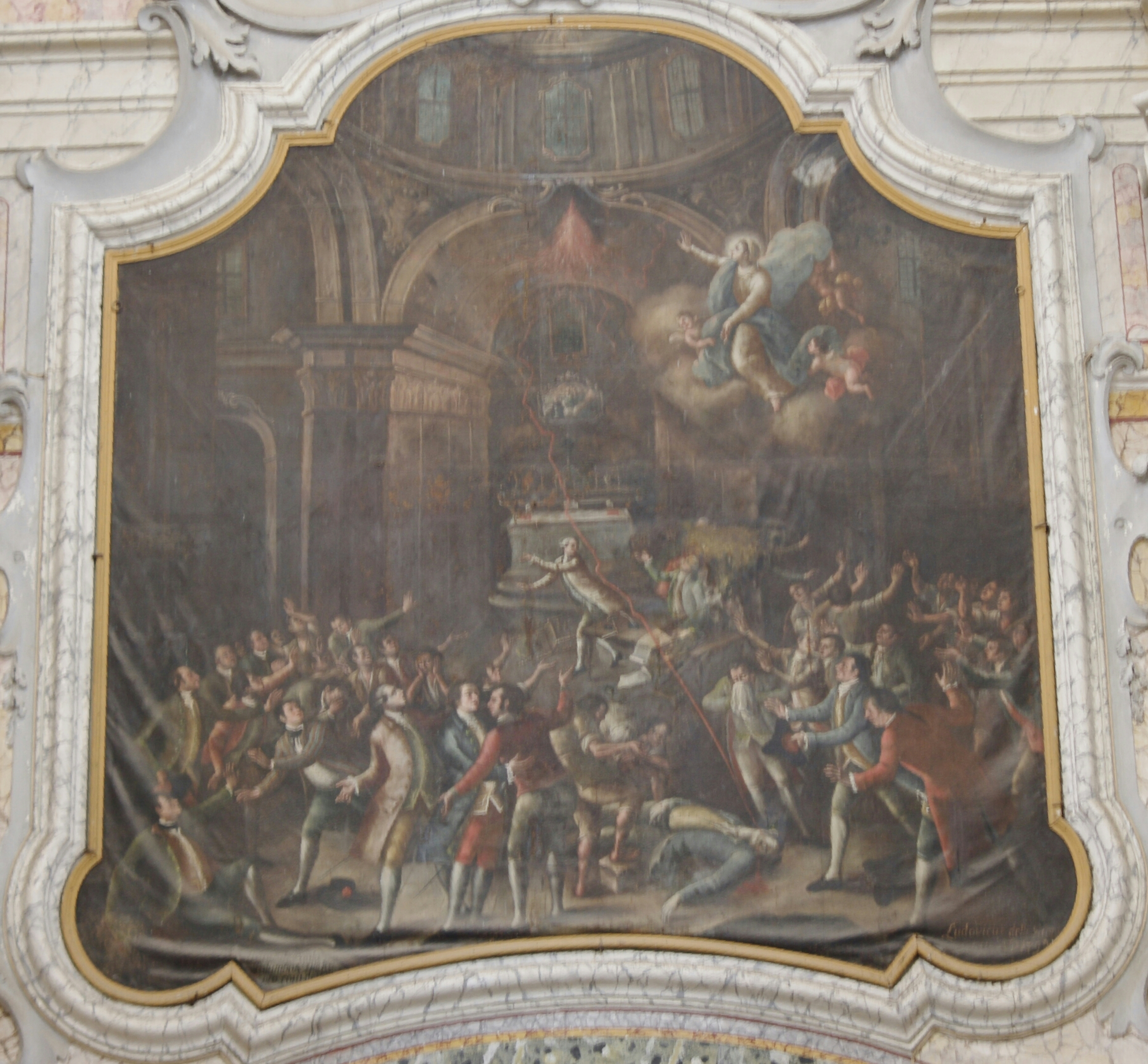
The Fall of Lightning, by Ludovico Delli Guanti

The interior decoration of the new church was carried out using stucco, cartouches unrolled by angels, curled volutes, later weighted down by coloring and gilding for a distorted sense of Baroque style. More modest is the contribution of the pictorial decoration, entrusted to Domenico Carella, Ludovico Delli Guanti, artists of Solimenesque culture and the painter Francesca Forleo-Brayda.

As for the paintings, those in the old church had been severely damaged and, unlike other objects, could not be reinstated to the altars; there are, however, numerous canvases, statues and art objects mostly from the Baroque period. On the main door in the counter-façade is The Fall of Lightning, a canvas by Ludovico Delli Guanti, which commemorates the event of March 28, 1779, believed to be miraculous because during a dispute, which erupted into heavy insults, that broke out inside the church during an administrative meeting, lightning killed Angelo Candita, one of those who had most used offensive and insulting tones in the holy place.

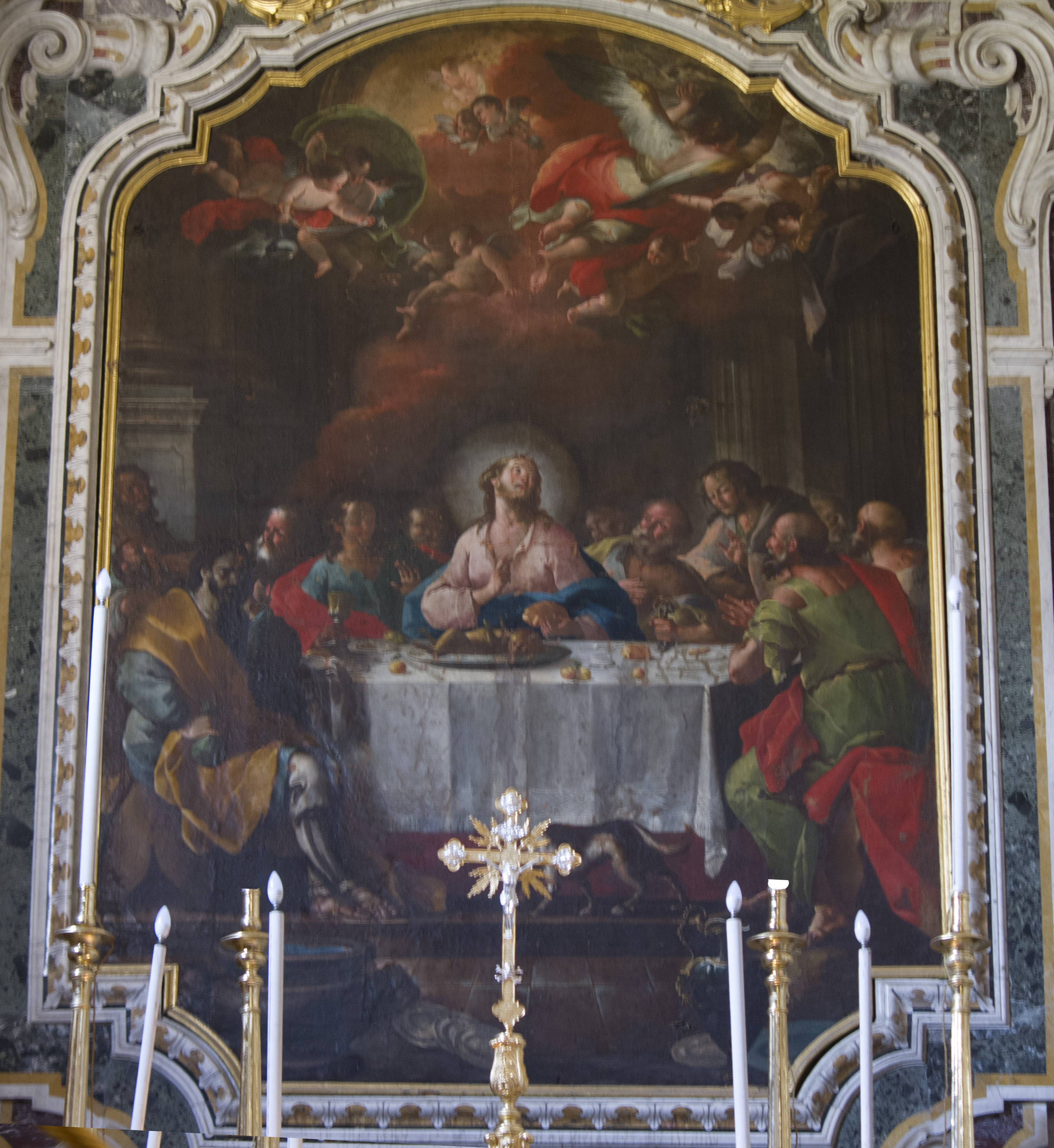
The Last Supper, by Domenico Antonio Carella

In the chapel of St. Joseph, on the altar, is the canvas of the Souls in Purgatory and in the apse that of the Holy Family, both works by Domenico Carella. There is also a papier-mâché statue, the work of Vincenzo Zingaropoli, depicting the saint to whom the chapel was dedicated, and one depicting St. Lawrence, the latter of which was carried in procession by the chapter, on the evening of August 9, to the rural Church of St. Lawrence, which has now been enlarged in the surrounding area and has become the parish of a very large district, bearing the saint's very name.

In the transept, on the right side, on the altar dedicated to St. John, there is the painting of the Virgin Mary with St. John the Baptist and St. Lawrence the Martyr (also by Domenico Carella). Past the transept area, there are an altar and a painting both dedicated to St. Anne, formerly belonging to the Imperial Castle. Before accessing this altar, one can admire a statue of St. Pio of Pietrelcina and a cabinet containing a statue of the Immaculate Conception, the work of Armando Morrone.

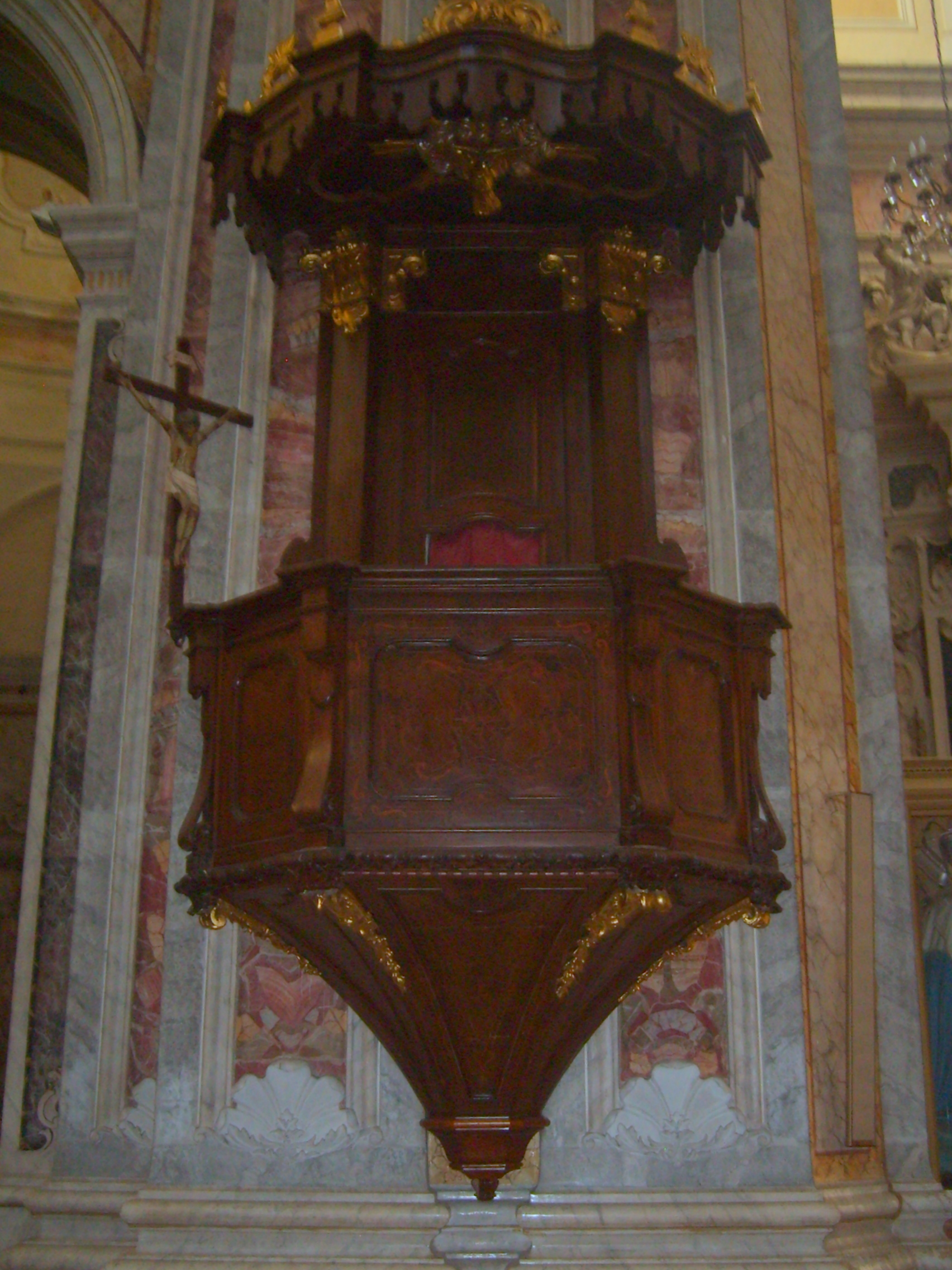
The pulpit

On the left wall are paintings depicting the finding of the Byzantine icon and the greening of the olive trees, another miracle that occurred on January 24, 1458 when, after a heavy snowfall that had irreparably damaged the olive trees around the city, Our Lady caused them to green up and produce abundant olives. In fact, on January 24, many celebrations are held, the last of which, being the most solemn, is celebrated by the diocesan bishop and concelebrated by the city clergy. Beneath this painting, in a wall display case, is a wooden statue of Our Lady of the Fountain, a Neapolitan sculpture.

To the left of the altar is a painting depicting the wooden statue of Our Lady of the Fountain; also on the side walls are two large paintings by Carella: the Delivery of the Keys and the Battle of Lepanto. Behind the chancel, in a closed cabinet is a papier-mâché statue of Our Lady of Pompeii, not visible throughout the year, but displayed from April 29 to May 8 on the occasion of the Novena in her honor and the Feast. The pulpit is made entirely of richly inlaid wood and leaning against the pillar; behind it is the cabinet with the statue of the Immaculate Conception, the work of Armando Morrone.

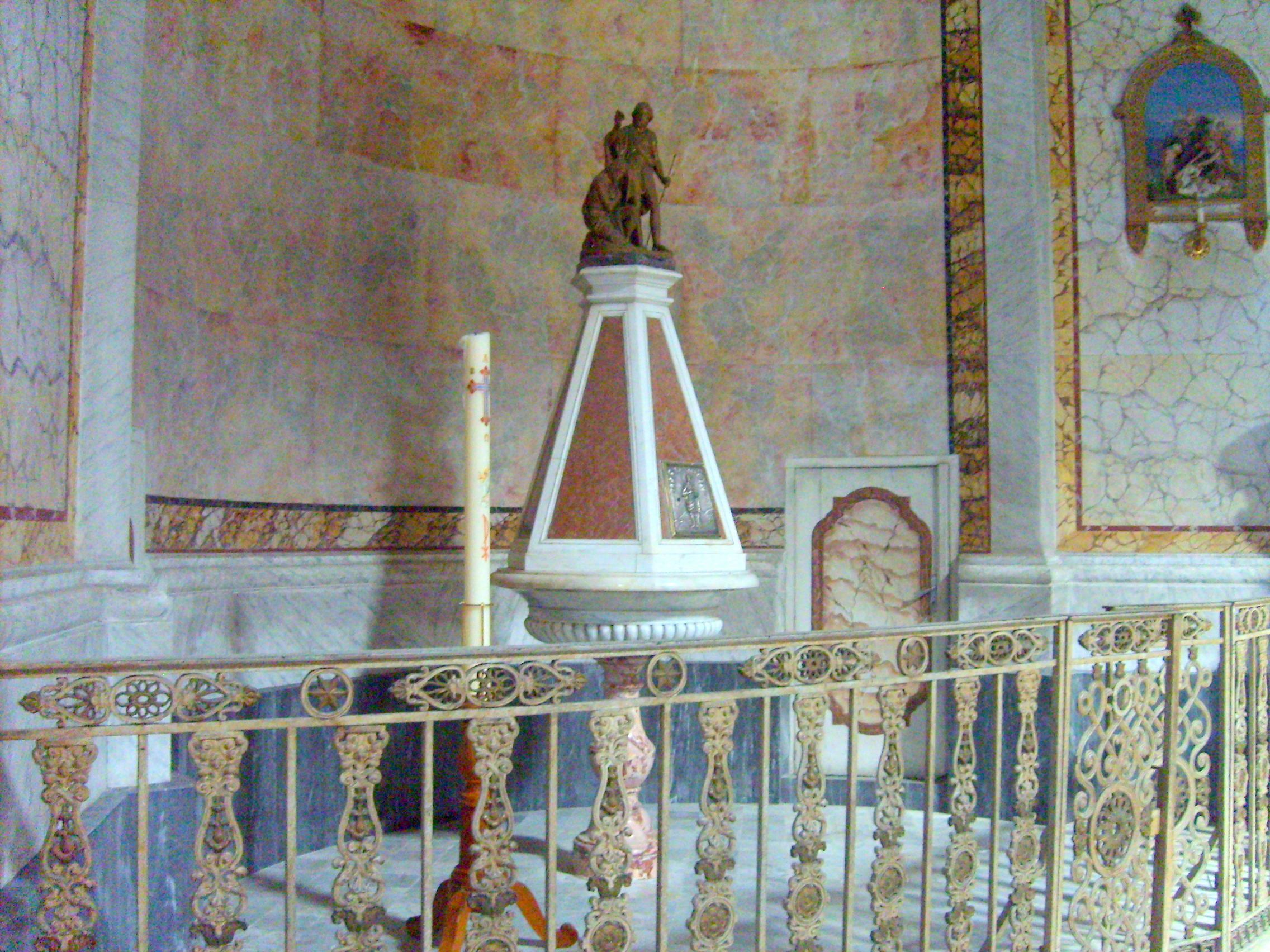
The baptismal font

In the chapel of the Blessed Sacrament, on the back and right walls, respectively, are the paintings of the Last Supper and Melchizedek, both attributed to Carella. Behind this altar is the headquarters of the Venerable Confraternity of the Blessed Sacrament, the oldest in the city and the Diocese.

In the chapel of Our Lady of Sorrows, on the other hand, there is a painting of the Deposition on the altar; in two niches facing each other before the transept are the statues of the Desolate, carried in procession on Good Friday morning in odd years, and Our Lady of the Rosary, a statue on a perch.

On the transept altar is another large painting, also attributed to Carella, depicting St. Orontius and St. Charles. Adjacent to this altar is a statue of the Sacred Heart of Jesus placed inside a cabinet.

Before the chapel of St. Roch, in two cabinets, are the papier-mâché statues of St. Joachim and St. Roch, the latter a work by the famous Pietro Paolo Pinca, and on the wall altar of the chapel is a painting depicting St. Roch; in the apse that extends the chapel is the marble baptismal font, dating from 1867, and a wooden statue of Christ Crucified, recently donated by a sculptor from Francavilla.

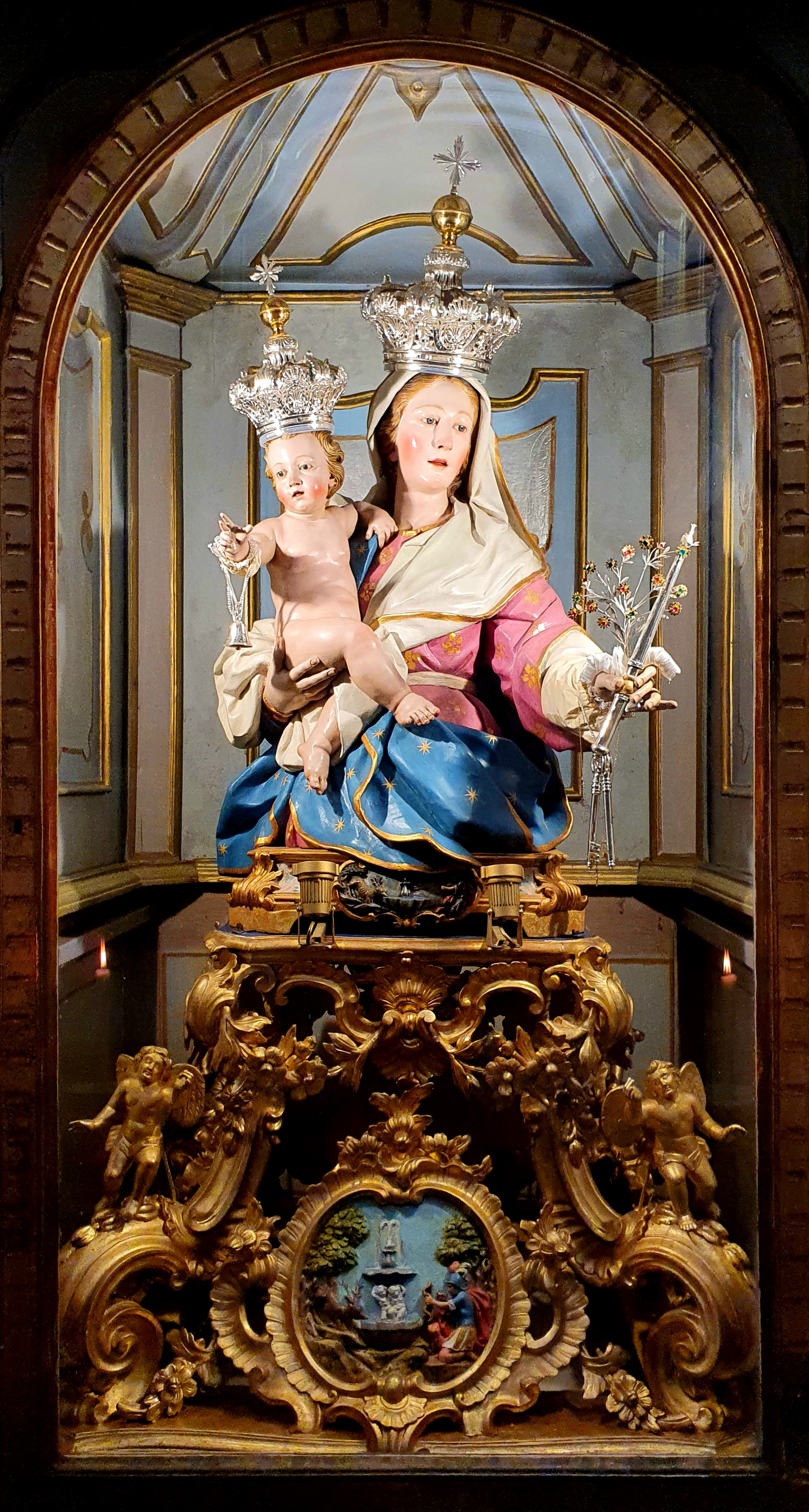
Wooden simulacrum of Our Lady of the Fountain with Child (18th cent.)

Of Renaissance workmanship is the crown of Our Lady of the Fountain, made by a local goldsmith and dated 1529, kept in the Basilica, and not visible. It was donated by the mayor during the Solemn Celebrations of Jan. 24 and Sept. 14, celebrations of Our Lady of the Fountain. Walking down the nave, on the floor is the symbol of the Basilica, blessed on Jan. 24, 2019, during the Pontifical of the Feast of Our Lady of the Fountain. To the left, also on the nave, before accessing the chancel, a statue of Our Lady of Peace is placed in a raised niche.

== The parish ==
With a population of 5,200, the parish of Our Lady of the Most Holy Rosary is the third largest in the Francavilla area. Since its founding, for centuries, it has been the only parish church (apart from the branch of St. Eligius). All other town parishes were established in the 20th century.

== Festivities in the basilica ==
- From January 9 to 23, the Fortnight to Our Lady of the Fountain, patron saint of the city, takes place. During these 15 days, the various religious and parish communities of the city make a pilgrimage to the patron saint, who is solemnly celebrated on Jan. 24, with several morning celebrations and an evening one, the latter presided over by the diocesan bishop and the city's priests.
- From April 29 to May 7, the Novena to Our Lady of the Rosary of Pompeii is held. On May 8, a procession with the image of Our Lady of the Rosary of Pompeii through the streets of the city takes place. The image is placed on a wagon, embellished with flowers and pushed by the brethren of the Blessed Sacrament.
- On Sept. 23, the "Padre Pio" prayer group celebrates its titular saint, who is displayed on a throne.
- From December 16 to 24, at 6:00 a.m., the Novena of Holy Christmas takes place. On those days, the preparation of the Nativity on the high altar begins.

== See also ==
- Francavilla Fontana
- History of Francavilla Fontana
- Roman Catholic Diocese of Oria
- Philip I, Prince of Taranto

== Bibliography ==
- Argentina, Feliciano (1970). La città natia. Fasano: Schena.
- Cammilleri, Rino (2020). Tutti i giorni con Maria, calendario delle apparizioni. Milano: Edizioni Ares.
- Fulgenzio Clavica e Rosario Jurlaro, ed. (2007). Francavilla Fontana. Milano: Mondadori Electa.
- Fulgenzio Clavica e Regina Poso, ed. (1990). Francavilla Fontana. Architettura e immagine. Galatina: Congedo.
- Palumbo, Pietro (1901). Storia di Francavilla Fontana. Arnaldo Forni.
