= Oria Cathedral =

Cathedral in Oria, Apulia, Italy

- Basilica Cathedral of Saint Mary of the Assumption
- Basilica Cattedrale Santa Maria Assunta in Cielo
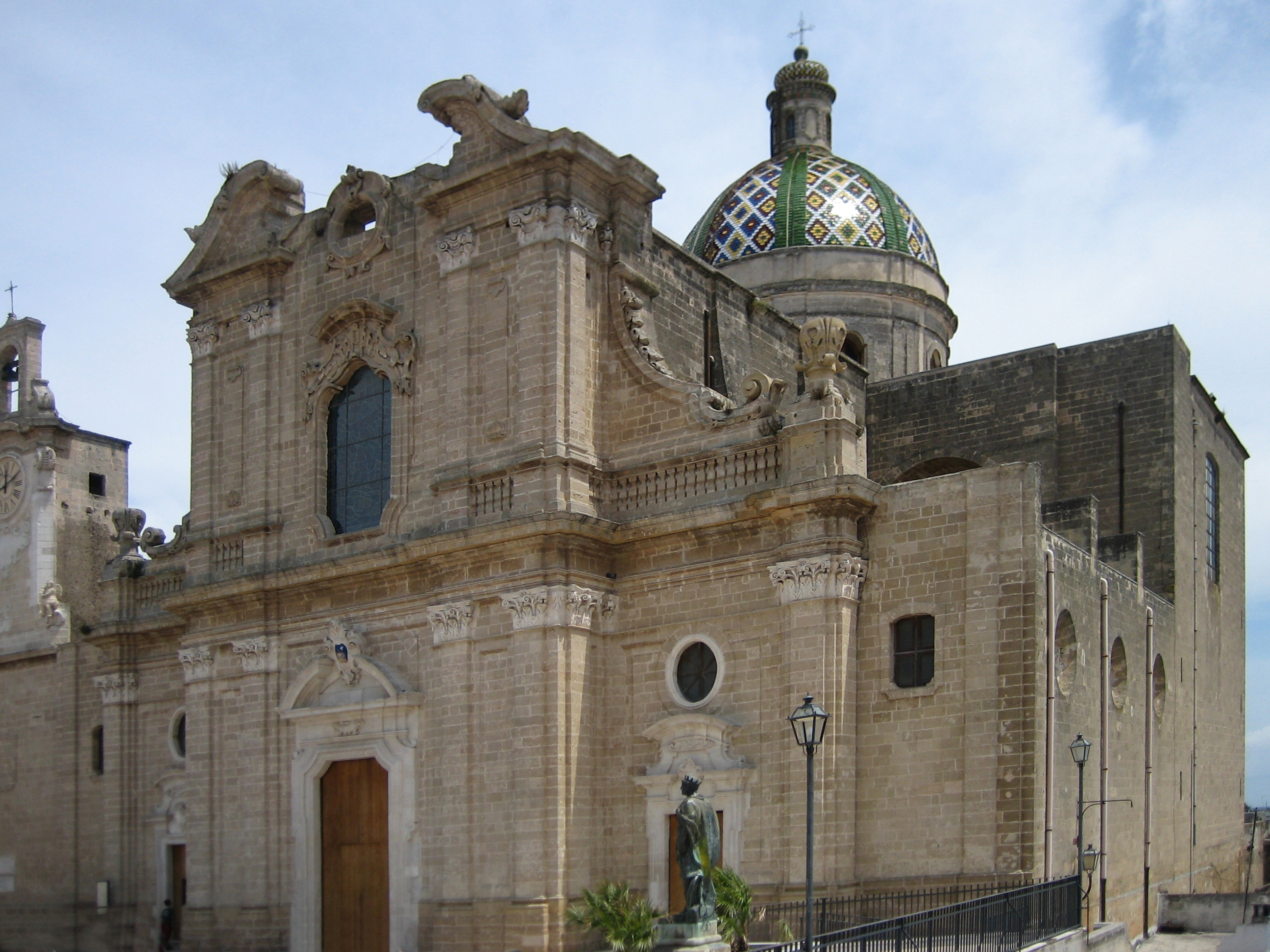
- West front of the cathedral
- Oria Cathedral
- 40.4977°N 17.6422°E
- Location: Oria, Apulia
- Country: Italy
- Denomination: Roman Catholic

History
- Status: Basilica
- Dedication: Saint John the Baptist

Architecture
- Functional status: Active
- Style: Baroque
- Years built: 1750-1756

Administration
- Province: Taranto
- Archdiocese: Oria

Oria Cathedral (Italian: Basilica di Santa Maria Assunta) is a Roman Catholic cathedral in Oria, province of Brindisi, Apulia, Italy, dedicated to the Assumption of the Virgin Mary. It is the episcopal seat of the Diocese of Oria.

== History and description ==
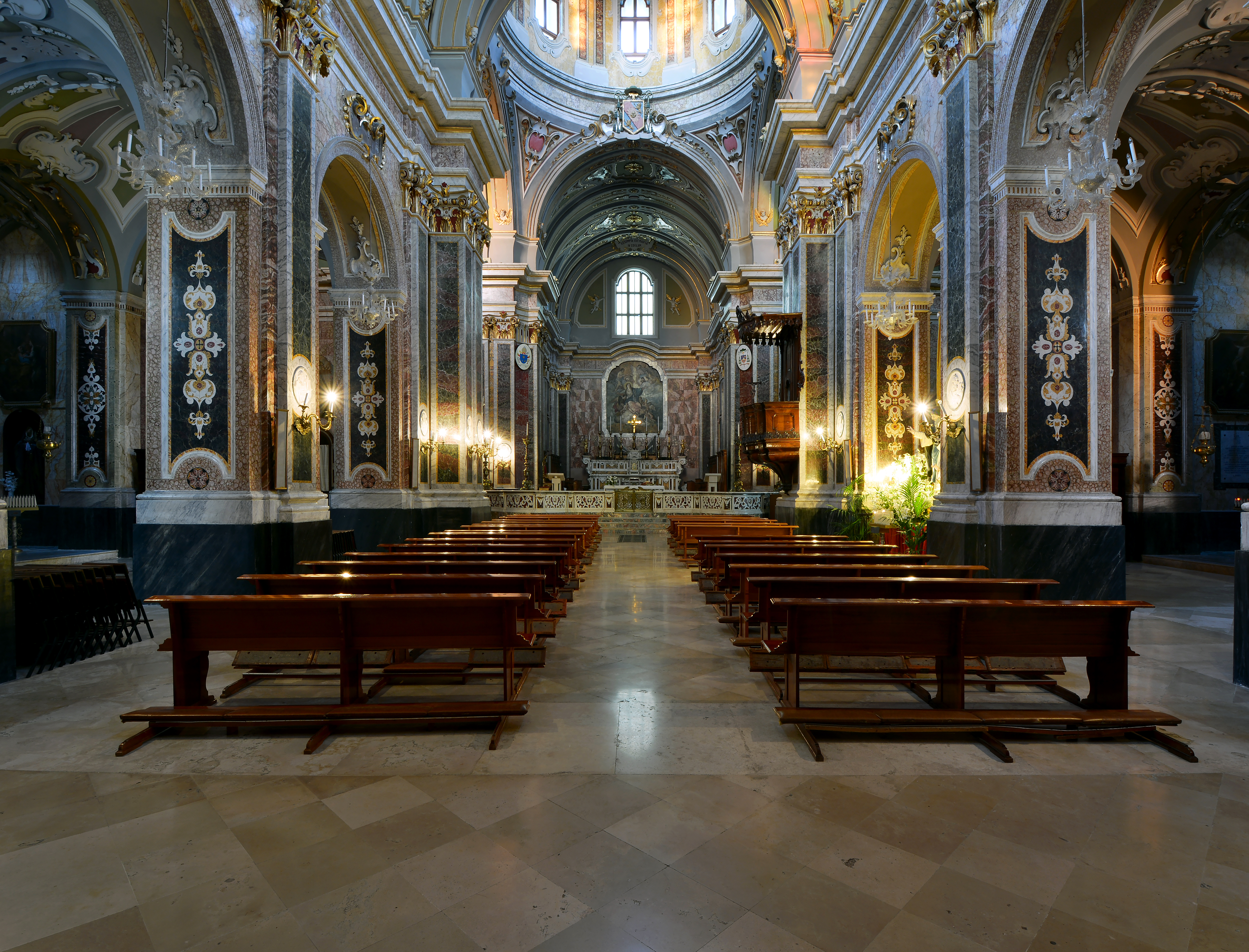
Interior of the cathedral

In 1750 the then bishop of Oria demolished the 13th-century Romanesque cathedral that stood previously on the site, which had been left unsafe by the earthquake of February 20, 1743. Two columns from the old church were purchased for 8000 ducats for use in the Capella Reggia of Caserta.

The new church was reconsecrated in 1756. The façade includes a clock tower to the left and a campanile to the right. The dome is covered with polychrome tiles. The interior is richly decorated. The interior of the church has a crypt with niches containing mummified bodies.

In 1992, Pope John Paul II granted the cathedral the status of a minor basilica.
