= Diocese of Oria =

Roman Catholic diocese in Italy

Coordinates: 40.5000°N 17.6333°E

Diocese of Oria Dioecesis Uritana

Catholic
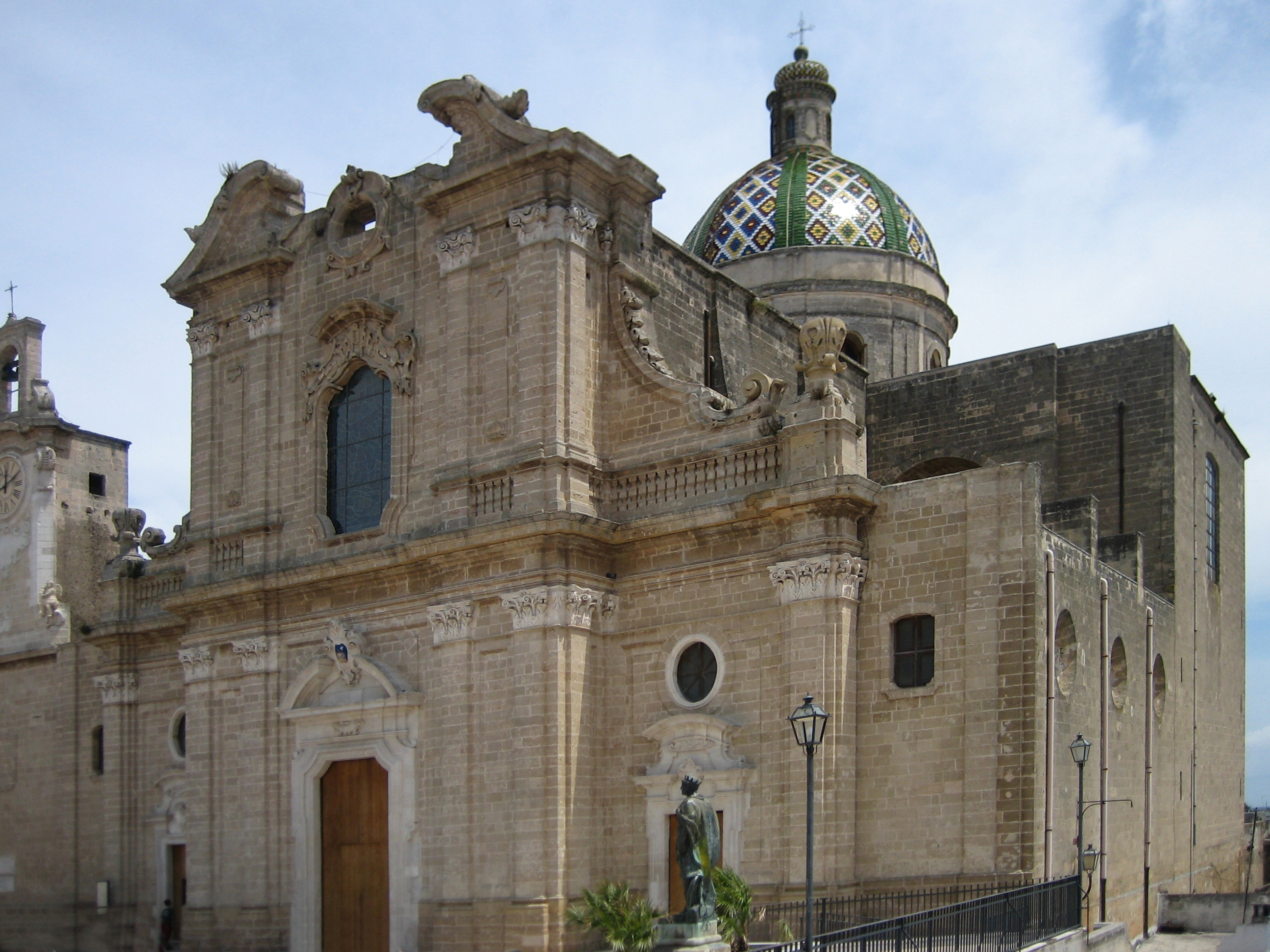
- Oria Cathedral

Location
- Country: Italy
- Ecclesiastical province: Taranto

Statistics
- Area: 921 km^{2} (356 sq mi)
- Population: Total; Catholics: (as of 2013); 177,743; 167,800 (est.) (98.4%)
- Parishes: 43

Information
- Denomination: Catholic Church
- Rite: Roman Rite
- Established: 8 May 1591
- Cathedral: Oria Cathedral (Basilica Cattedrale di S. Maria Assunta in Cielo)
- Patron saint: Barsanuphius of Gaza
- Secular priests: 76 (diocesan); 42 (Religious Orders)

Current leadership
- Pope: Leo XIV
- Bishop: Vincenzo Pisanello

Map
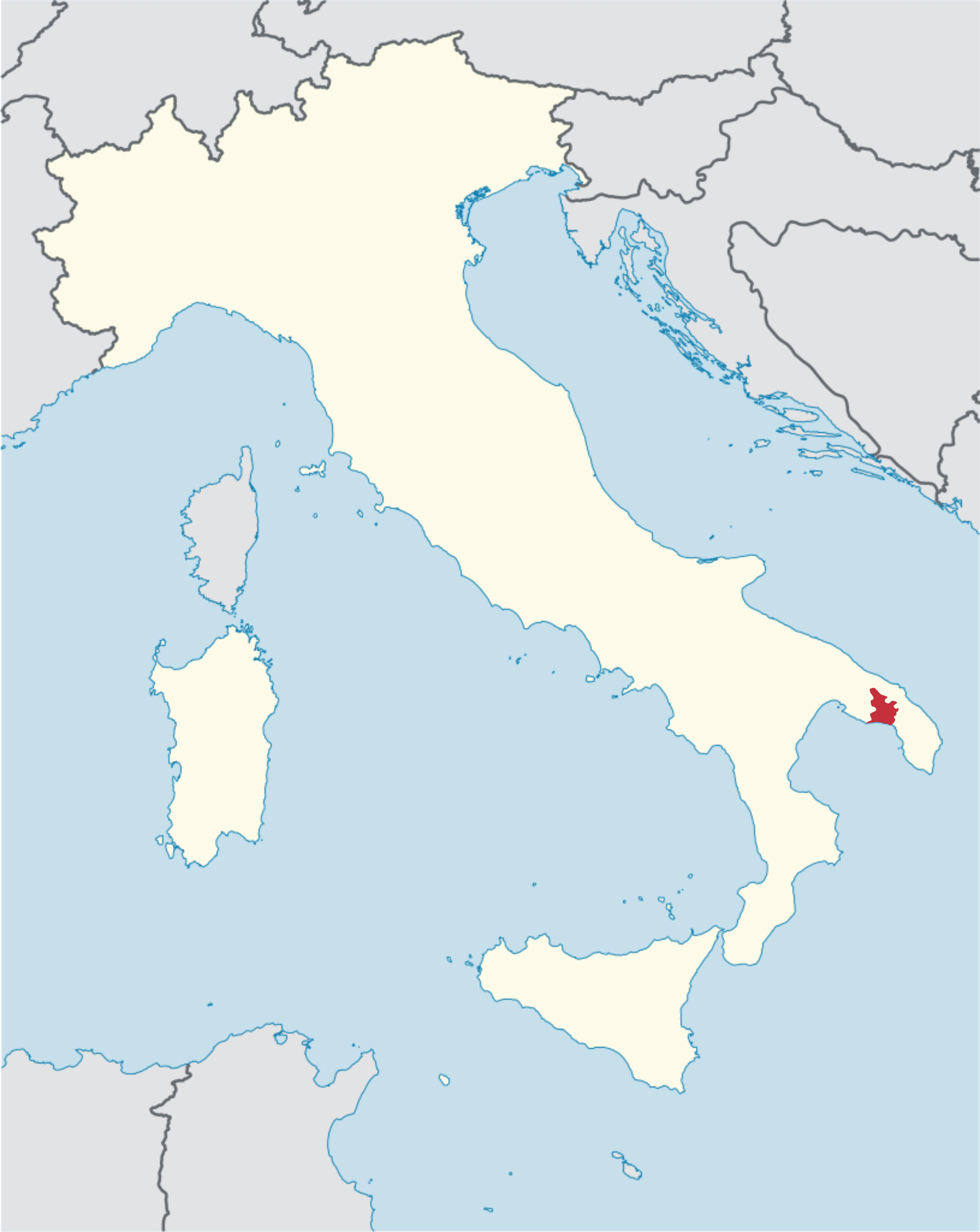

Website
- www.diocesidioria.it

The Diocese of Oria (Latin: Dioecesis Uritana) is a Latin diocese of the Catholic Church in Apulia. It is a suffragan of the Archdiocese of Taranto.

== History ==
It would appear that Oria Oyra (Greek: Ὑρία - Hyria, Οὐρία - Uria) in early times had bishops of its own, because there is a record on a slab in the cathedral, dating from the eighth or ninth century, in which there is mention of a Bishop Theodosius, who was not one of the bishops of Brindisi. A bishop of Euryatensis is named in a Novella of Emperor Leo the Isaurian in 813, which might be a Greek spelling of Oriatensis. When Brindisi was destroyed by the Saracens in the ninth century, its bishops established their see at Oria and called themselves Archbishops of Oria and Brindisi. In the late 9th century, bishop Theodosius, who had acted as papal legate to the court of Constantinople, build a chapel for the relics of Barsanuphius of Gaza, a hermit and desert father. These relics would be later transferred into the cathedral while the church of San Francesco da Paola was built over the chapel.

In 918, Oria, along with Reggio, Siponto and Taranto, was attacked and devastated by Moors. In 924 there was another attack by Saracens and Moors. In 925 Muslims captured Taranto and Oria. In 926 the Hungarians devastated a town called Auria, which has been identified as Oria. In 977 the Saracens (Agareni) burned and destroyed the town. In 979 Bishop Andrea Albanese began to reconstruct the town, despite the rapacity of the Greek Porphyrius the Protospatha. Porphyrius killed the bishop.

=== Struggle with Brindisi ===
In 1055 the Normans first appeared in Calabria, initiating a lengthy struggle between Byzantine forces who were occupying the territory and the Norman invaders. The Chronicum Northmannicum states that a battle took place at Oria, and that Humphredus (Onophrius), the brother of Count William Iron-Arm, conquered the Greeks; he died the next year. His brother Count Robert Guiscard captured Hydruntum and Castra Minervae, and in 1056 he seized Taranto, but was repulsed; he took it permanently in May 1060. That summer, Count Malagerius came to Oria and expelled the Greeks from it. In 1062, Robert Guiscard took Brindisi again, and later came to Oria and took it again. In 1082 Oria was besieged by Geoffrey of Conversano, but in April his uncle Robert Guiscard raised the siege.

On 3 October 1089, while he was staying at Trani, Pope Urban II wrote to Godinus, Bishop of Oria. He informed the bishop that the situation in the area had been fully investigated, and reminded him that the episcopal seat which was now situated at Oria had from antiquity been located in Brindisi, but that, when Brindisi had been devastated, the seat had been transferred to the municipality of Oria. But now that the city of Brindisi had been restored, the Pope wanted the episcopal seat returned to Brindisi, since Count Goffredus had promised the Pope that the properties of the Church of Brindisi would be restored and even augmented, and that the Church of Brindisi would live under its own government in accordance with Canon Law, always saving the authority of the Roman Pontiff. Even after their return to their former capital, however, the Bishops of Brindisi were addressed on occasion as "Archbishop of Oria". The title of archbishop was claimed from the days when Brindisi had belonged to the Greek church, but the Roman pontiffs declined, at least until the time of Paschal II, to recognize the title. This arrangement persisted until 1591.

Godinus of Brindisi, however, did not fully carry out the restoration of his diocesan seat, as Pope Urban had wanted. This brought a sharp rebuke from Urban II ten years later in the form of a letter to Bishop Godinus, warning him that he should keep to his episcopal seat in Brindisi and not engage in consecrating chrism, ordaining priests, and holding synods at Oria. He did advise him that the clergy and people of Oria should show proper respect for their Mother Church, and should not seek chrism from any other church. Their church was not a cathedral, and Oria was a town which belonged to the diocese of Brindisi, as Pope Calixtus II stated.

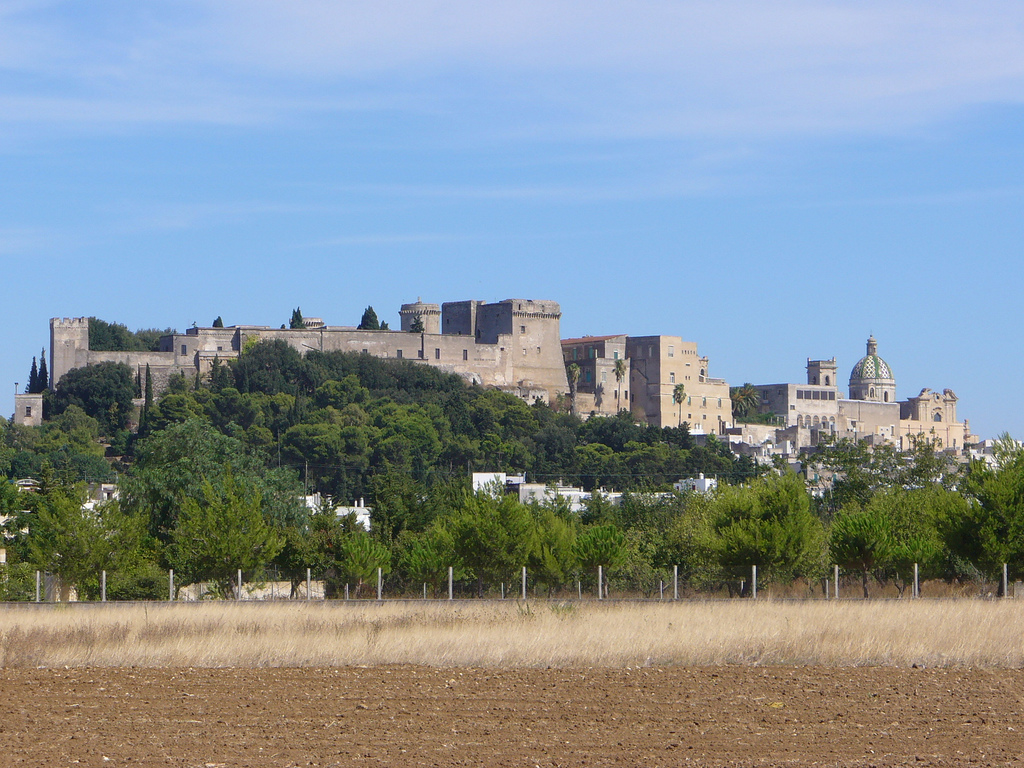
View of Oria

Frederick II (1194–1250) built a castle on the hill of Oria, perhaps beginning in 1233, when he also fortified Naples, Trani, Bari, Brindisi, Albanese, Pagano and Papatodero. He also gave the Archbishop of Brindisi the piece of property on the eastern side of the hilltop where the castle was being built as the site for a new church, which was much later to become Oria Cathedral.

In 1219, as he was returning from his unsuccessful trip to Syria to convert the Sultan of Egypt, Saint Francis of Assisi visited Oria and began the establishment of a Franciscan convent there.

In 1559 the Marquisate of Oria was bestowed by King Philip II of Spain and Naples on Frederigo Borromeo of Milan, and when he died without issue in 1562, his successor was Cardinal Carlo Borromeo, the Administrator of the diocese of Milan. The Cardinal held the Marquisate for seven years before selling it to the Imperiali family (1569), for 40,000 ounces of gold. The gold was distributed by the Cardinal to the poor in a single day.

=== New diocese ===
The town was erected into an episcopal see on 8 May 1591 by Pope Gregory XIV, after the death of the Spaniard Bernardino de Figueroa of the Roman Catholic Archdiocese of Brindisi-Ostuni in November 1586, and an interregnum of four and a half years. The diocese of Oria was assigned as a suffragan of the Archdiocese of Taranto. The first bishop of Oria was Vincenzo del Tufo.

In 1675 the town of Oria had a population estimated at 3,500 persons. In 1746 the population had grown to an estimated 7000 persons.

Oria Cathedral (the Cathedral of the Bodily Assumption of the Blessed Virgin Mary into Heaven) had a chapter composed of four dignities (the Archdeacon of Oria, the Cantor, the Subcantor, and the Treasurer) and sixteen Canons. In 1746 there were eighteen Canons. The present Baroque cathedral dates from 1756, having been constructed after a violent earthquake destroyed the thirteenth-century church which had become the cathedral in 1591.

On 23 January 2010, Pope Benedict XVI named Father Vincenzo Pisanello a priest of the archdiocese of Otranto and Episcopal Vicar for Administration and Pastor of the Parish of Saints Peter and Paul Church in Galatina, Italy (Lecce), as Bishop of Oria. He was born in Galatina on 3 May 1959 and ordained to the priesthood on 23 June 1984.

== Bishops of the Diocese of Oria ==
Erected: 8 May 1591

- Vincenzo del Tufo, C.R. (1596 – Sep 1600 Died)
- Lucio Fornari (16 Sep 1601 – Sep 1618 Died)
- Giandomenico Ridolfi, C.R. (27 Jan 1620 – 15 Jul 1630 Died)
- Marco Antonio Parisi (24 Nov 1632 Confirmed – 24 Jan 1649 Died)
- Raffaele de Palma, O.F.M. Conv. (14 Feb 1650 – 5 Mar 1674 Died)
- Carlo Cuzzolini (9 Sep 1675 Confirmed – 25 Feb 1697)
- Tommaso Maria Franza, O.P. (3 Jun 1697 – 28 Jan 1719 Died)
- Giambattista Labanchi (27 May 1720 – 15 Jul 1746 Died)
- Castrensis Scaja (28 Nov 1746 – 12 Oct 1755 Died)
- François Joseph Antoine de los Reyes (5 Apr 1756 Confirmed – 19 Feb 1769 Died)
- Giovanni Capece (12 Mar 1770 Confirmed – Nov 1770 Died)
- Enrico Celaja (30 Mar 1772 Confirmed – Mar 1780 Died)
- Alexander Maria Calefati (17 Sep 1781 Confirmed – 30 Dec 1793 Died)
- Fabrizio Cimino, C.SS.R. (29 Jan 1798 – 22 Mar 1818 Died)
- Francesco Saverio Triggiani, O.F.M. Conv. (21 Dec 1818 Confirmed – 27 Dec 1828 Resigned)
- Michele Lanzetta (18 May 1829 Confirmed – 6 Apr 1832 Resigned)
- Giovanni Domenico di Guido (29 Jul 1833 Confirmed – 16 Dec 1848 Died)
- Luigi Margarita, C.M. (17 Feb 1851 Confirmed – 15 Apr 1888 Died)
- Tommaso Montefusco (1 Jun 1888 – 21 Jun 1895 Died)
- Teodosio Maria Gargiulo (21 Jun 1895 Succeeded – 16 Dec 1902 Died)
- Antonio di Tommaso (22 Jun 1903 – 8 Feb 1947 Retired)
- Alberico Semeraro (1 May 1947 – 17 Mar 1978 Retired)
- Salvatore De Giorgi (17 Mar 1978 Succeeded – 4 Apr 1981 Appointed, Archbishop of Foggia)
- Armando Franco (12 Sep 1981 – 15 Dec 1997 Died)
- Marcello Semeraro (25 Jul 1998 – 1 Oct 2004 Appointed, Bishop of Albano)
- Michele Castoro (14 May 2005 – 15 Jul 2009 Appointed, Archbishop of Manfredonia-Vieste-San Giovanni Rotondo)
- Vincenzo Pisanello (23 Jan 2010 – )

== See also ==
- Minor Basilica of the Most Holy Rosary

== Books ==
=== Reference Works ===
- Eubel, Conradus, ed. (1913). Hierarchia catholica, Tomus 1 (second ed.). Münster: Libreria Regensbergiana. (in Latin)
- Eubel, Conradus, ed. (1914). Hierarchia catholica, Tomus 2 (second ed.). Münster: Libreria Regensbergiana. (in Latin)
- Eubel, Conradus, ed. (1923). Hierarchia catholica, Tomus 3 (second ed.). Münster: Libreria Regensbergiana.
- Gams, Pius Bonifatius (1873). Series episcoporum Ecclesiae catholicae: quotquot innotuerunt a beato Petro apostolo. Ratisbon: Typis et Sumptibus Georgii Josephi Manz. pp. 946–947. (Use with caution; obsolete)
- Gauchat, Patritius (Patrice) (1935). Hierarchia catholica IV (1592-1667). Münster: Libraria Regensbergiana. (in Latin)
- Ritzler, Remigius; Sefrin, Pirminus (1952). Hierarchia catholica medii et recentis aevi V (1667-1730). Patavii: Messagero di S. Antonio. (in Latin)
- Ritzler, Remigius; Sefrin, Pirminus (1958). Hierarchia catholica medii et recentis aevi VI (1730-1799). Patavii: Messagero di S. Antonio. (in Latin)
- Ritzler, Remigius; Sefrin, Pirminus (1968). Hierarchia Catholica medii et recentioris aevi sive summorum pontificum, S. R. E. cardinalium, ecclesiarum antistitum series... A pontificatu Pii PP. VII (1800) usque ad pontificatum Gregorii PP. XVI (1846) (in Latin). Vol. VII. Monasterii: Libr. Regensburgiana.
- Ritzler, Remigius; Pirminus Sefrin (1978). Hierarchia catholica Medii et recentioris aevi... A Pontificatu PII PP. IX (1846) usque ad Pontificatum Leonis PP. XIII (1903) (in Latin). Vol. VIII. Il Messaggero di S. Antonio.
- Pięta, Zenon (2002). Hierarchia catholica medii et recentioris aevi... A pontificatu Pii PP. X (1903) usque ad pontificatum Benedictii PP. XV (1922) (in Latin). Vol. IX. Padua: Messagero di San Antonio. ISBN 978-88-250-1000-8.

=== Studies ===
- Antonucci, Giovanni (1933). "Medioevo salentino : (Ricerche ed appunti): Sull'origine della diocesi di Oria", in Rinascenza salentina 1 (1933), pp. 310–316, at 315-316.
- Avino, Vincenzio d' (1848). Cenni storici sulle chiese arcivescovili, vescovili, e prelatizie (nullius) del regno delle due Sicilie (in Italian). Naples: dalle stampe di Ranucci. pp. 511–515.
- Cappelletti, Giuseppe (1870). Le chiese d'Italia dalla loro origine sino ai nostri giorni (in Italian). Vol. vigesimoprimo (21). Venezia: Antonelli. pp. 141–144.
- Errico, F. A. (1906). Cenni storici sulla città di Oria e del suo insigne vescovado. Napoli: Sordomuti.
- Gentilcore, David (1992). From Bishop to Witch: The System of the Sacred in Early Modern Terra D'Otranto. Manchester University Press. pp. 31–33, 110–111, 210–213, 245–252. ISBN 978-0-7190-3640-8.
- Giordano, O. (1972), "Documenti papali dei secc. XI e XII relative alle Diocesi di Brindisi e di Oria," in: Studi di Storia Pugliese in onore di Giuseppe Chiarelli Volume I (Galatina: M. Congido 1972), pp. 422–438.
- Kehr, Paulus Fridolin (1962). Italia pontificia. Regesta pontificum Romanorum. Vol. IX: Samnium–Apulia–Lucanium. Berlin: Weidmann, pp. 383–396.
- Lanzoni, Francesco (1927). Le diocesi d'Italia dalle origini al principio del secolo VII (an. 604) (in Italian). Rome: Biblioteca Apostolica Vaticana. p. 310.
- Loud, G. A. (2007). The Latin Church in Norman Italy. Cambridge University Press. ISBN 978-1-107-32000-0.
- Loud, Graham (2014). The Age of Robert Guiscard: Southern Italy and the Northern Conquest. New York: Routledge. ISBN 978-1-317-90023-8.
- Papatodero, Gasparo; Lombardi, Giuseppe (1858). Della fortuna di Oria città in provincia di Otranto nel Regno di Napoli dissertazioni tre di Gaspare Papatodero (in Italian). Naples: Salvatore Piscopo. pp. esp. 369.
- Pedío, Tommaso (1976). "La Chiesa di Brindisi dai Longobardi ai Normanni", in Archivio storico pugliese 29 (1976), pp. 3–47.
- Turrisi, Carmelo (1978). La diocesi di Oria nell'Ottocento. Aspetti socio-religiosi di una diocesi del Sud (1798-1888) (in Italian). Rome: Gregorian Biblical BookShop. ISBN 978-88-7652-185-0.
- Ughelli, Ferdinando; Coleti, Niccolo (1721). Italia Sacra Sive De Episcopis Italiae, Et Insularum adiacentium (in Latin). Vol. Tomus nonus (9). Venice: Antonio Coleti.
