= Michele Castoro =

Italian Roman Catholic archbishop (1952–2018)

The Most Reverend Michele Castoro
- Archbishop of Manfredonia-Vieste-San Giovanni Rotondo
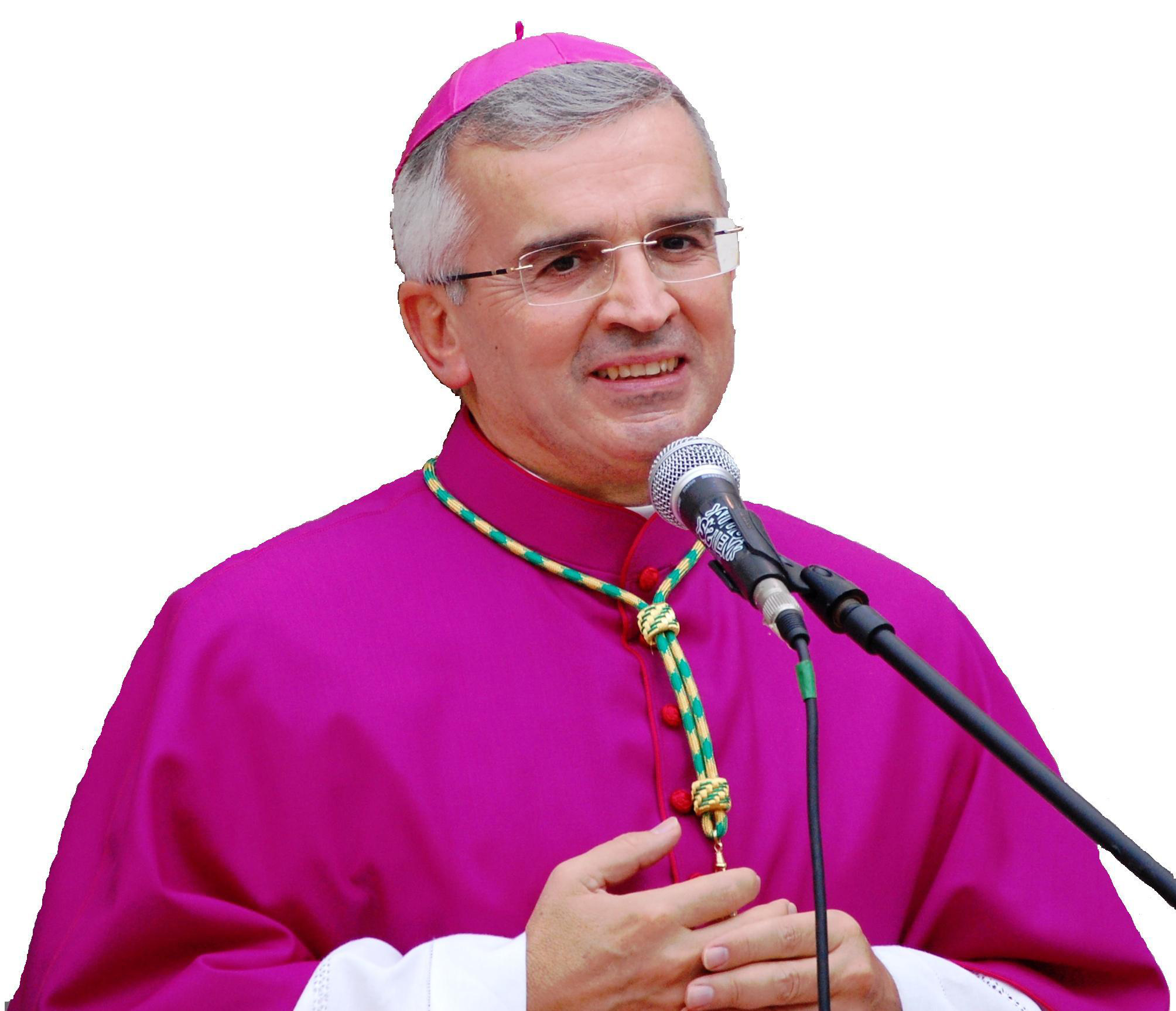
- Church: Roman Catholic Church
- Archdiocese: Manfredonia-Vieste-San Giovanni Rotondo
- See: Manfredonia-Vieste-San Giovanni Rotondo
- Appointed: 15 July 2009
- Installed: 19 September 2009
- Term ended: 5 May 2018
- Predecessor: Domenico Umberto D'Ambrosio
- Successor: Franco Moscone
- Previous post: Bishop of Oria (2005-09)

Orders
- Ordination: 6 August 1977 by Salvatore Isgró
- Consecration: 25 June 2005 by Giovanni Battista Re

Personal details
- Born: Michele Castoro; 14 January 1952 Altamura, Italy
- Died: 5 May 2018 (aged 66) Casa Sollievo della Sofferenza, San Giovanni Rotondo, Italy
- Buried: Altamura Cathedral
- Education: Pontifical Roman Major Seminary; Pontifical Lateran University; Pontifical Gregorian University; University of Bari
- Motto: In nomine Iesus ("In the name of Jesus")
- Coat of arms

Michele Castoro (14 January 1952 – 5 May 2018) was an Italian Roman Catholic archbishop. Castoro was born in Italy and was ordained to the priesthood in 1975. He served as bishop of the Roman Catholic Diocese of Oria from 2000 to 2009. He then served as archbishop of the Roman Catholic Archdiocese of Manfredonia-Vieste-S. Giovanni Rotondo, Italy, from 2009 until his death.

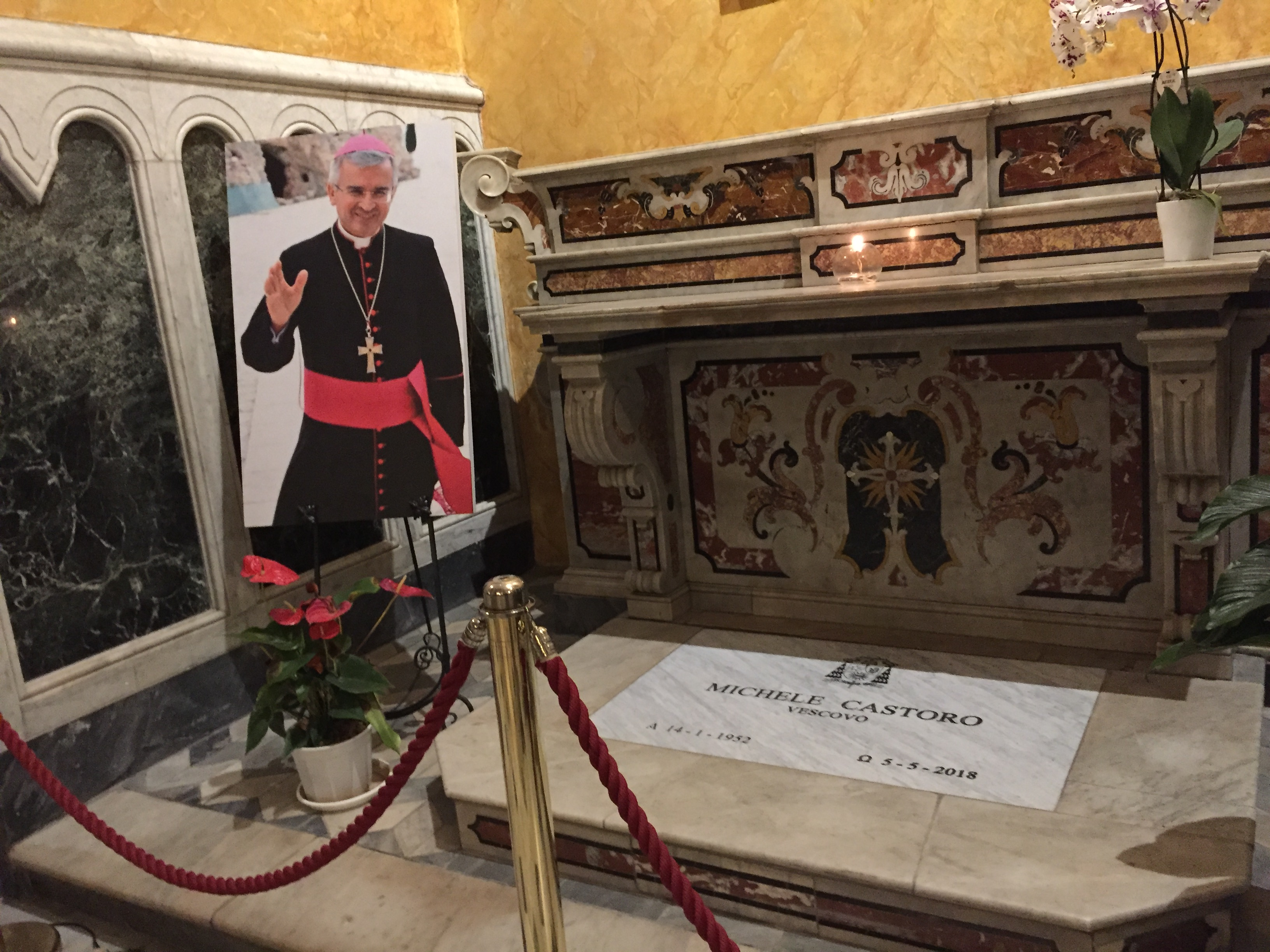
Tomb in the Altamura Cathedral.
