= Cosmo Francesco Ruppi =

Roman Catholic archbishop

- Archbishop of Lecce
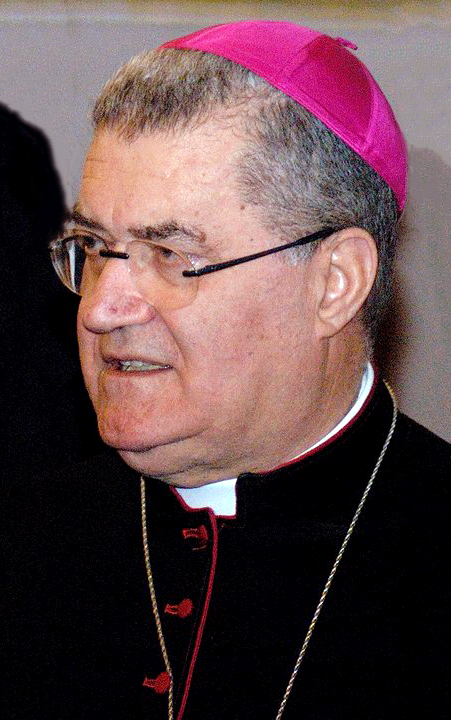
- Church: Catholic Church
- Archdiocese: Archdiocese of Lecce
- In office: 7 December 1988 – 16 April 2009
- Predecessor: Michele Mincuzzi
- Successor: Domenico Umberto D'Ambrosio
- Previous posts: Apostolic Administrator of Ugento-Santa Maria di Leuca (1992-1993); Bishop of Termoli-Larino (1986-1988); Bishop of Termoli & Larino (1980-1986)

Orders
- Ordination: 18 December 1954 by Gregorio Falconieri
- Consecration: 29 June 1980 by Corrado Ursi

Personal details
- Born: 6 June 1932 Alberobello, Province of Bari, Kingdom of Italy
- Died: 29 May 2011 (aged 78)

Cosmo Francesco Ruppi (6 June 1932 – 29 May 2011) was the Roman Catholic archbishop of the Archdiocese of Lecce, Italy.

Ordained in 1954, Ruppi was named a bishop and was appointed to the Lecce Archdiocese in 1988. Archbishop Ruppi retired in 2009.
