= List of municipalities of the Province of Taranto =

The following is a list of the 29 municipalities (comuni) of the Province of Taranto in the region of Apulia in Italy.

== List ==
Municipality	Population (2026)	Area (km²)	Density
Avetrana	6,109	74.17	82.4
Carosino	6,380	10.93	583.7
Castellaneta	15,798	242.32	65.2
Crispiano	12,816	112.30	114.1
Faggiano	3,366	21.06	159.8
Fragagnano	4,889	22.41	218.2
Ginosa	21,721	188.49	115.2
Grottaglie	29,976	102.12	293.5
Laterza	14,584	161.17	90.5
Leporano	8,202	15.33	535.0
Lizzano	9,444	47.18	200.2
Manduria	29,528	180.41	163.7
Martina Franca	46,753	298.72	156.5
Maruggio	5,138	49.07	104.7
Massafra	31,766	128.00	248.2
Monteiasi	5,190	9.75	532.3
Montemesola	3,467	16.43	211.0
Monteparano	2,239	3.85	581.6
Mottola	15,103	213.96	70.6
Palagianello	7,429	43.86	169.4
Palagiano	15,712	69.97	224.6
Pulsano	11,162	18.27	610.9
Roccaforzata	1,729	6.15	281.1
San Giorgio Ionico	13,850	23.56	587.9
San Marzano di San Giuseppe	8,796	19.19	458.4
Sava	15,033	44.57	337.3
Statte	12,540	67.32	186.3
Taranto	185,112	249.86	740.9
Torricella	4,096	26.93	152.1

== See also ==
- List of municipalities of Apulia
- List of municipalities of Italy
