= Terre Tarentine =

Protected origin extra-virgin olive oil

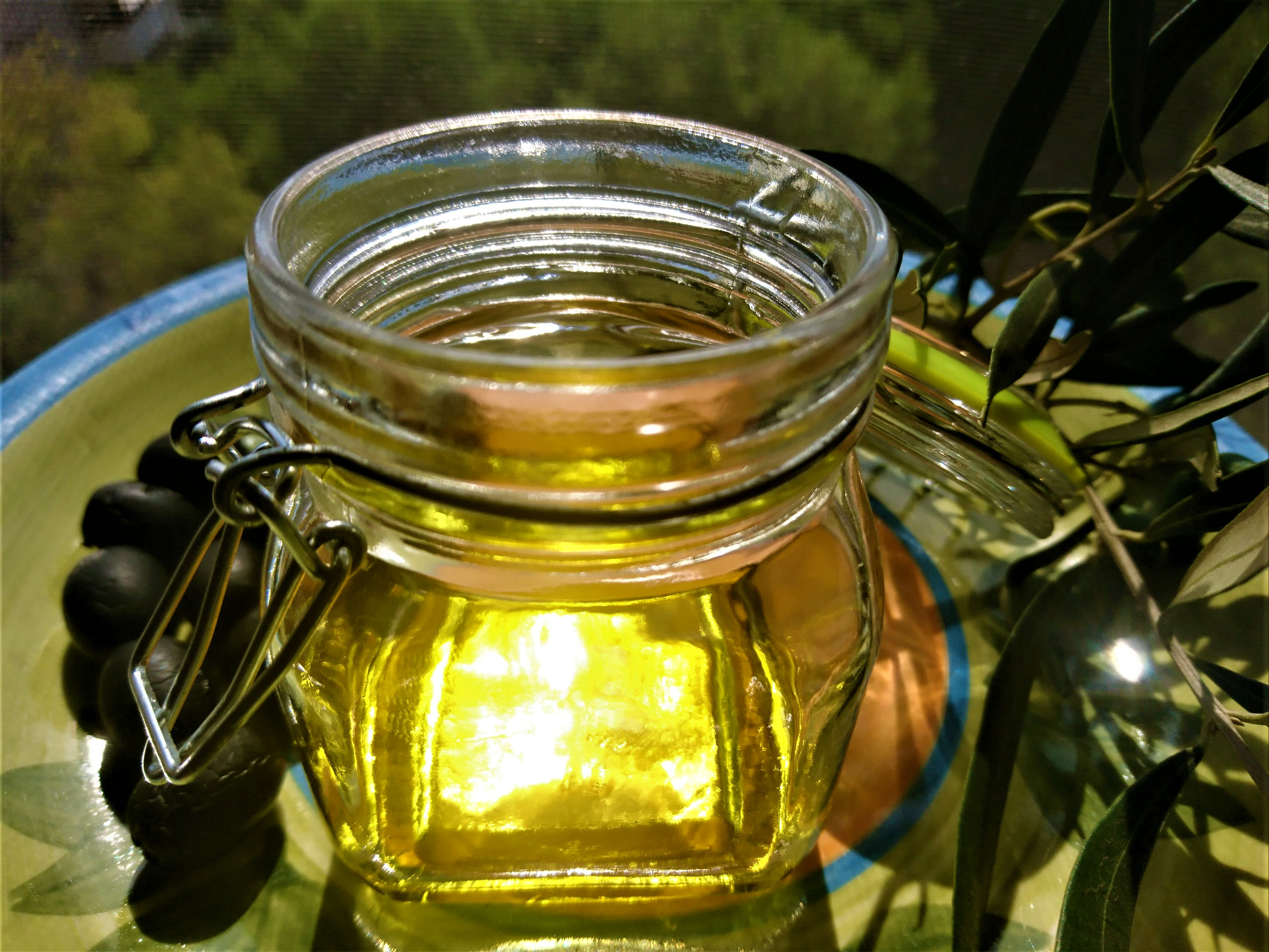
Extra-virgin olive oil Terre Tarentine

The extra-virgin olive oil Terre Tarentine is produced with the olive cultivars Leccino and Coratina and Ogliarola for, at least, 80%. They are mixed with other minor varieties of the local olive groves. It is recognised as PDO product.

== Origins ==
The cultivation of the olive tree in the western part of the Gulf of Taranto has been introduced by the Messapians during the 10th century B.C. and it has been improved by the Greeks and the Phoenicians. In the National Archeological Museum of Taranto it is possible to see some Greek amphorae with mythological scenes linked with the olive tree and its cultivation.

== Geography ==
The extra-virgin olive oil Terre Tarentine is produced in the western area of the province of Taranto next to the border with Basilicata on the Ionian side of Apulia. This territory includes the municipalities of Taranto, Ginosa, Laterza, Castellaneta, Palagianello, Palagiano, Mottola, Massafra, Crispiano, Statte, Martina Franca, Monteiasi and Montemesola. The soil is sandy mainly made of limestone.

== Characteristics ==
The extra-virgin olive oil Terre Tarentine is yellow with green shades. It has a fruity taste with some light bitter and spicy aroma. It is recommended for vegetables (raw or cooked) and for the second courses like meat and, above all, fish. It is used for some traditional fish recipes like the ones with the Mussels of Taranto. Despite the PDO designation, it is very hard to find and, as opposed to the other PDO extra-virgin olive oil of Apulia, a specific market is not developed yet.

== See also ==
- Terra d'Otranto (extra-virgin olive oil)
- Olive oil
