= Angelo Todaro =

Italian comics artist (1945–2025)

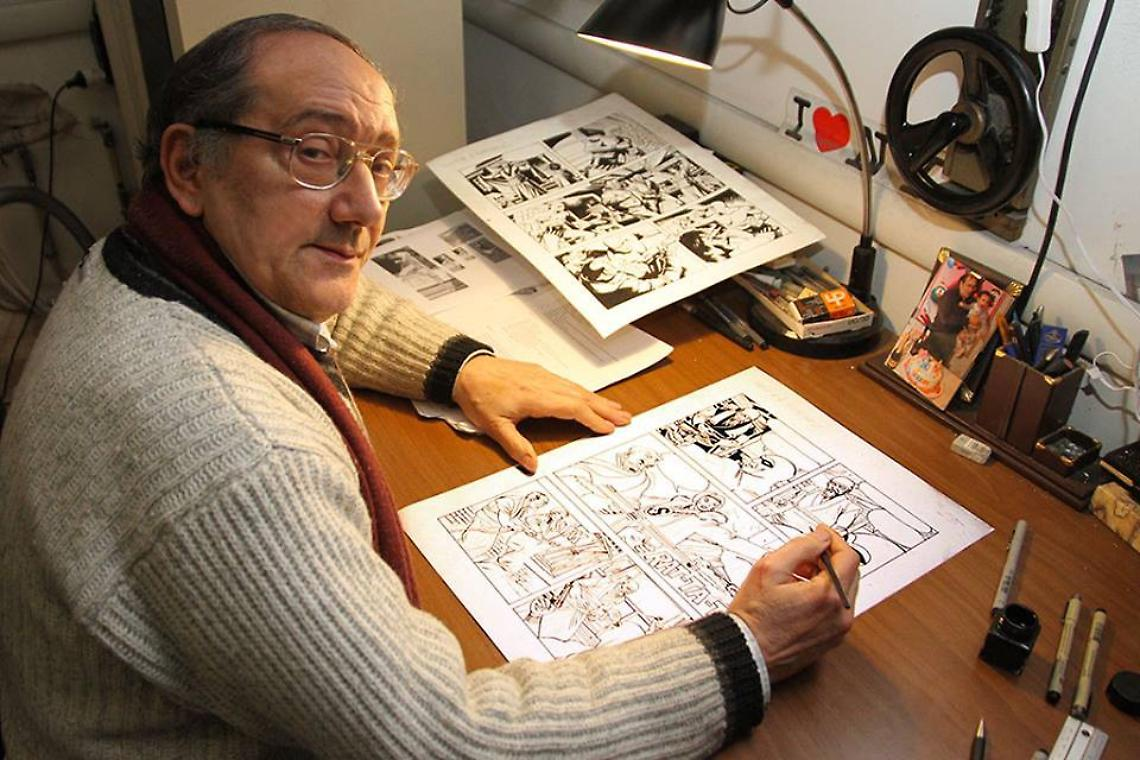
- Born: 17 December 1945; Fragagnano, Italy
- Died: 22 March 2025 (aged 79); Martina Franca, Italy
- Occupation: Comic artist

Angelo Todaro (17 December 1945 – 22 March 2025), also known under the pen names Paul Bennett and Al Todd, was an Italian comics artist, comics writer and essayist whose career spanned over 50 years.

== Life and career ==
Born in Fragagnano, at young age Todaro moved to Rome where he studied at the local Liceo artistico. He made his professional debut in 1964, creating the crime comics series Gordon Schott. After creating the sci-fi series Alika, in 1967 he started a long collaboration with the publisher Fratelli Spada, becoming the author of the Italian versions of Mandrake the Magician, The Phantom and Rip Kirby.

Starting from the late 1960s, Todaro collaborated with numerous international publishers, notably illustrating Turok and Star Trek for Western Publishing, Martin's Marvellous Mini for International Publishing Company, and the western series Buffalo Bill and Lasso for the West-German publisher Basteï Verlag. Between 1970s and 1990s he was also an author of erotic comics for the publishers Ediperiodici and Edifumetto. Starting from 2016, he collaborated with Frew Publications for The Phantom.

Todaro was also active as an essayist, mostly interested in the military and political history of World War II. He was the founder of the Studio Puntolinea. He was also editor in a number of magazines. He died in Martina Franca on 22 March 2025, at the age of 79.
