= Carosino =

- Comune
- Comune di Carosino
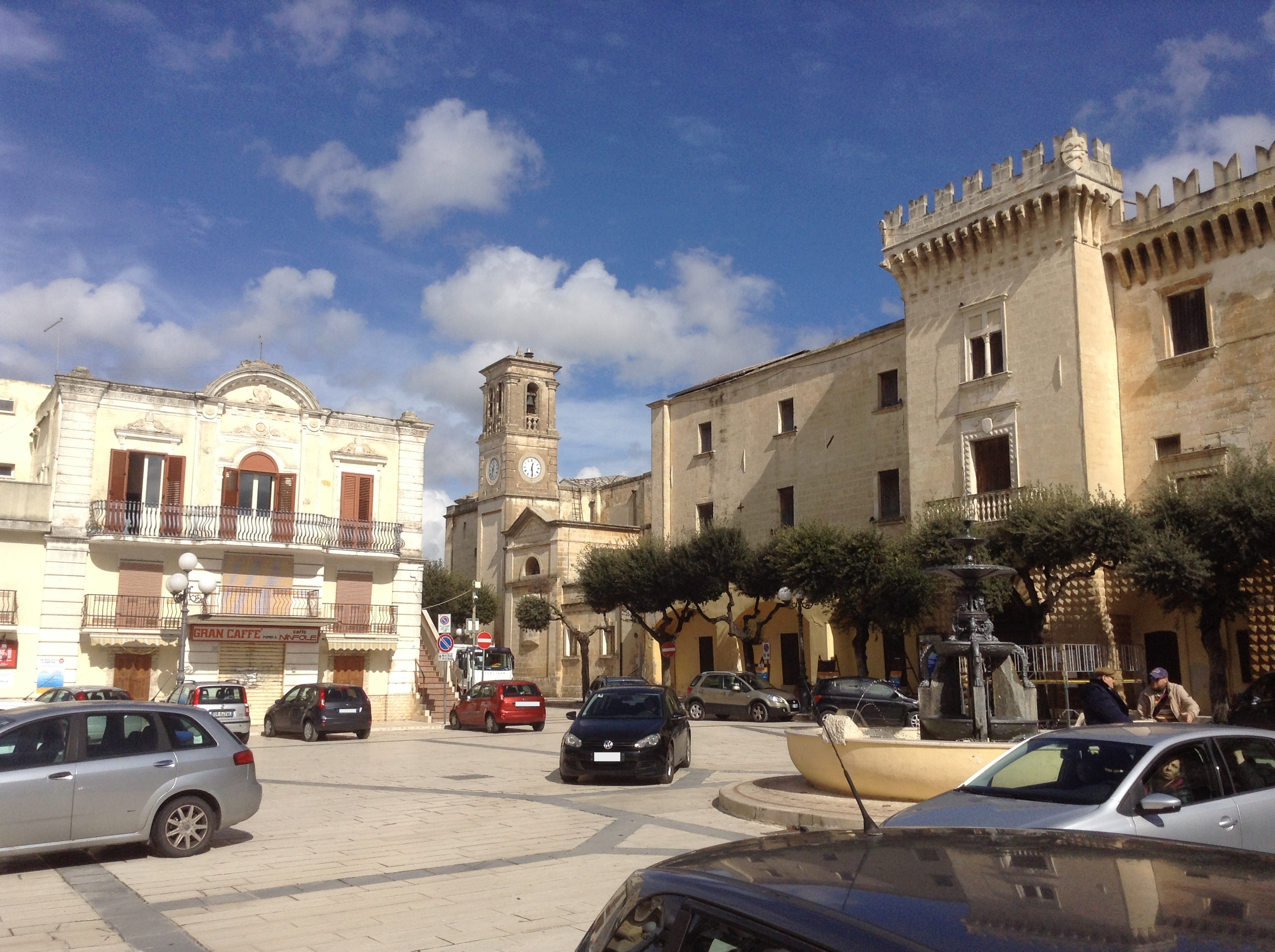
- View of Carosino

- Coat of arms

- Location in Taranto Province

- Location of Carosino in Italy Carosino (Apulia)
- Coordinates: 40°28′N 17°24′E
- Country: Italy
- Region: Apulia
- Province: Taranto (TA)
- Frazioni: Grottaglie, Monteiasi, Monteparano, San Giorgio Ionico, Taranto

Government
  - Mayor: Arcangelo Sapio

Area
  - Total: 10.79 km^{2} (4.17 sq mi)
- Elevation: 74 m (243 ft)

Population (31 December 2017)
  - Total: 7,028
  - Density: 651.3/km^{2} (1,687/sq mi)
- Demonym: Carosinesi
- Time zone: UTC+1 (CET)
  - Summer (DST): UTC+2 (CEST)
- Postal code: 74021
- Dialing code: 099
- ISTAT code: 073002
- Patron saint: St. Blaise
- Saint day: 3 February
- Website: Official website

Carosino is a town and comune in the province of Taranto, in the northern Salento, part of the Apulia region of southeast Italy. Carosino was historically an Arbëreshë settlement. Its economy is based on the production of wine, olive oil and grapes.

== Etymology ==
According to Carosino's municipal website, Antonio Cinque believes that the name derives from the Latin "carus" (dear, precious, valued) and "situs" (site) or "sinus" (valley). G. Giovine believes that "sinus," which can also mean a fold of clothing or the bosom of a person, is related to the religious significance of Mary, mother of Jesus in the town.

== Geography ==
Carosino is located in the north of the Salento, the peninsula that forms the heel of the Italian boot and is the southern part of the region of Apulia. The town is on a flat area, approximately 70–75 meters above sea level. The comune of San Giorgio Ionico is to the west, Monteparano to the south, and Monteiasi and Grottaglie to the north. Taranto is 13km to the west.

== History ==
In ancient times, the area of Carosino was probably inhabited by the Messapians. In 1904, a hoard of 76 silver coins dating to the 4th century BCE was found in a field near Carosino, perhaps indicating the relative wealth of the area.

After the Saracen sack of Taranto in 927 CE, Carosino may have been abandoned for a time and then re-colonized under the name Citrignano. The first historical records date to 1348 during the period of the Angevin Kingdom of Naples. In the 1460s, a band of armed Albanians, following in the wake of Skanderbeg, razed the village, which was a feudal possession of a local nobleman, Raimondo de Noha. In 1471, the Antoglietta family bought the feudal rights to the village. In 1517, Carosino became a barony and passed to the Simonetta family, and then the Muscettola family in 1524. It was probably at this time that the Byzantine Rite form of Christianity disappeared from the area, along with the Arbëresh language of the Albanian settlers left over from the previous century, due to the efforts of Archbishop Lelio Brancaccio.

The barony passed once more to the Albertini family and then finally to the Imperiali family. The Berio-Merulli family held the barony in 1806, when feudalism was abolished in the Kingdom of Naples. By 1875, Carosino was a comune in the Kingdom of Italy, and the Marulli family sold its property and the Palazzo Ducale to Roberto d'Ayala Valva.

The church of Santa Maria delle Grazie, now located along Via Dante north of the town's main square, Piazza Vittorio Emanuele III, was probably built in the 15th century. The church building underwent a major expansion in 1763. In the 16th century, there is evidence of devotion to St. Blaise, and in 1807, the town began a feast in honor of the saint. In 1853, a chapel of St. Blaise was built and 1908 the town successfully petitioned Pope Pius X to make St. Blaise the protector of the town.

== Monuments And Places Of Interest ==
- The Palazzo Ducale was built in 1400 by the Simonetta family. In 1895, Roberto d'Ayala Valva donated it to the comune.
- The church of Santa Maria delle Grazie was probably built in the 15th century, and whose last renovations are dated 1763. It has a painting of the Madonna del Rosario, a crucifix of the 18th century, and above the main altar, a fresco of the 17th century.
- The church of St. Francis of Assisi.
- The monument to the dead from the Second World War.
- The monuments to Saint Pio of Pietrelcina and Saint John Bosco.

== International relations ==
Carosino is twinned with:

- Maratea, Italy
