= Miss Progress International =

International beauty pageant

- Formation: 2010
- Type: Competition/Pageant
- Headquarters: Carosino
- Location: Italy
- Official language: English; Italian; Spanish
- President: Giuseppina Nobile
- Slogan: Women for Progress
- Current titleholder: Faith Kalau; Kenya
- Website: www.womenforprogress.it

Miss Progress International is an annual international competition that promotes projects related to health, human rights, and the environment. It was established in 2010 in Italy under the leadership of its founder, Giuseppina Nobile, who is also the President.

The format of Miss Progress International is especially original: it does not focus on women’s physical appearance, placing emphasis on their ideas and social commitment. It has inspired other similar events, yet remains unique because contestants are never required to parade in swimwear or take part in runway segments that just display their bodies.

The event is promotes the United Nations' Sustainable Development Goals, of which it was a forerunner. and women's empowerment, giving a voice to young women, whatever their background

The primary goal of the event is to implement the winning project by organizing a fundraising effort, in collaboration with the winner, to cover the necessary costs.

Since 2023, Miss Progress International has been held as the flagship competition within the Women for Progress event., but it remains the main show during which the author of the best project is elected winner.

The current titleholder is Faith Kalau of Kenya. As part of her reign, she is implementing Dignity Behind the Bars, an ongoing social impact project supporting women inmates in selected Kenyan correctional facilities. The initiative focuses on improving hygiene and access to essential sanitary products, while promoting dignity, well-being, and social inclusion among incarcerated women..

== History ==
Miss Progress International was founded by the Associazione Culturale In Progress, based in Carosino, Italy. The first edition was held from 19 to 26 September 2010 in Puglia under the moral patronage of the Italian Ministry of Tourism, the Regione Puglia, and the municipalities of Taranto and Ostuni.

Since its inception, all editions of Miss Progress International have been held in Puglia. Over time, the competition evolved into a platform focused on the United Nations Sustainable Development Goals (SDGs), with delegates promoting social impact projects aimed at addressing environmental, educational, health, and community-development challenges in their home countries.

The COVID-19 pandemic led to the postponement of the eighth edition from 2020 to 2021.

Throughout its history, the event has received moral patronage and institutional support from several Italian public bodies, including the Ministries of Tourism, Foreign Affairs and Culture, as well as the National Office against Racial Discrimination (UNAR).

Following health issues involving one of the association's founders, the competition was suspended and resumed in 2014, when the second edition took place from 9 to 18 May. The event subsequently received formal recognition from President of the Italian Republic Giorgio Napolitano.

Throughout its history, the event has received moral patronage and institutional support from several Italian public bodies, including the Ministries of Tourism, Ministry of Foreign Affairs, Ministry of Culture, as well as the National Office against Racial Discrimination (UNAR).

== Titleholders ==
Edition	Year	Miss Progress International	Project Theme	Location	Date	Entrants	Ref.
11th	2026	Faith Evans; Kenya	Human Rights	Santa Maria di Leuca, Italy	June 5, 2026	16	
10th	2025	Khrystma Siberth; Brazil	Health	Santa Maria di Leuca, Italy	June 1, 2025	22	
9th	2023	Odalis Soza; Nicaragua	Environment	Muro Leccese, Italy	September 23, 2023	20	
8th	2022	Francesca Speranza; Italy	Environment	Santa Maria di Leuca, Italy	September 17, 2022	19	
2020-2021		COVID-19 pandemic					
7th	2019	Vanesa Giraldo Lopez; Colombia	Environment	Carosino, Italy	October 4, 2019	20	
6th	2018	Eyra Luz Baquero Mola; Colombia	Human Rights	Leporano, Italy	September 27, 2018	25	
5th	2017	Jedaver Pancho Opingo; Philippines	Human Rights	Carosino, Italy	October 21, 2017	19	
4th	2016	Natascha Fischer; Benelux	Human Rights	Francavilla Fontana, Italy	September 30, 2016	22	
3rd	2015	Liz Arévalos; Paraguay	Health	Santa Maria di Leuca, Italy	May 15, 2015	20	
2nd	2014	Arantza Barba; Bolivia	Environment	Santa Maria di Leuca, Italy	May 23, 2014	25	
1st	2010	Julieth William Lugembe; Tanzania	Human Rights	Taranto, Italy	September 24, 2010	28	

Countries/Territories by number of wins
Country/Territory	Titles	Year(s)
Colombia	2	2018, 2019
Kenya	1	2026
Brazil	1	2025
Nicaragua	1	2023
Italy	1	2022
Philippines	1	2017
Benelux	1	2016
Paraguay	1	2015
Bolivia	1	2014
Tanzania	1	2010

=== Other awards ===
One winner is selected for each theme, and the contestant with the highest overall score is awarded the main title. Beginning with the second edition, the title of Miss Progress Cultural Integration has been chosen by the contestants through a vote, selecting the individual they believe best embodies the values of integration, including peaceful coexistence, friendliness, and congeniality.

Year	Miss Progress Health	Miss Progress Environment	Miss Progress Human Rights	Miss Progress Cultural Integration	Miss Progress Best National Costume	Miss Progress Elegance	Miss Progress Internet	Ref.
2026	Nicole Bertolini; Italy	Anapaula Quintero Vega; Puerto Rico	Faith Evans; Kenya	Candice François; Reunion	Bryanna Galdamez; Mexico	Ilsa van der Heijden; Netherlands	Anapaula Quintero Vega; Puerto Rico	
2025	Khrystma Siberth; Brazil	Valentina Bueno; Colombia	Daniela Bañuelos; Riviera Maya	Milagros Gonzalez; Nicaragua	Andrea Soria; Mexico	Minouche Evers; Netherlands	Nicole Parayno; Philippines	
2023	Kana Sagara; Japan	Odalis Soza; Nicaragua	Kimberley Luna; Mexico	Nicole Herzan; Peru	Arya Naik; India	Jilldeen Ezeudu; Canada	Trixia Parmerola; Spain	
2022	Andrea Pineda; Colombia	Francesca Speranza; Italy	Beatriz Awatin; Philippines	Gabriela Monserrate; Puerto Rico	Andrea Pineda; Colombia	Gisela Neyra; Peru	Beatriz Awatin; Philippines	
2019	Sarah M. Joson; Philippines	Vanesa Giraldo Lopez; Colombia	Kome Adheke; Nigeria	Gabriella Ochoa; United States	Kisanet Molla; Ethiopia	Adélaide De Boisvilliers; France	Heather Rodriguez; Honduras	
2018	Hannah Higgins; United Kingdom	Sarah Bona; Philippines	Eyra Luz Baquero Mola; Colombia	Natali Guerrero; Guatemala	Brenda Vélasquez Haro; Mexico	Yurika Watanabe; Japan	Audrey Awor; Kenya	
2017	Natalia Carmen Guerrero; Peru	Claudia Baroni; Italy	Jedaver Pancho Opingo; Philippines	Daria Feshchenkova; Ukraine	Ianaiara Gonzalez Nieradka; Paraguay	Constanza De Mattheu; Brazil	Naomi Train; United Kingdom	
2016	Bethany Cammack; United Kingdom	Marianella Chavez Serrano (Cocos Island); Costa Rica	Natascha Fischer; Benelux	Yameesha Rasadi; Sri Lanka	Rafaela Torres; Brazil	Tal Ben Haim; Israel	Carmelle Martinez; Canada	
2015	Liz Arévalos; Paraguay	Kelly Van den Dungen; Netherlands	Susanna Schrabak; United States	Neidy Robles; Mexico	Laila Khan Niazi; Pakistan	Neidy Robles; Mexico	Diane Rosa; Brazil	
2014	Jorreni Marcon; Brazil	Arantza Barba; Bolivia	Marie Darline Exume; Haiti	Esterina Rumé; Italy	Kristina Velez Toledo; Puerto Rico	Not awarded	Dorota Bartlewska; Sweden	
2010	Dian Biemans; Netherlands	Lakindes Brown; Bahamas	Julieth William Lugembe; Tanzania	Carolina Palmegiani; Venezuela	Lakindes Brown; Bahamas	Not awarded	Not awarded	

== See also ==
- List of beauty pageants
