= Maruggio =

Maruggio Marùggiu (Sicilian)
- Comune
- Comune di Maruggio
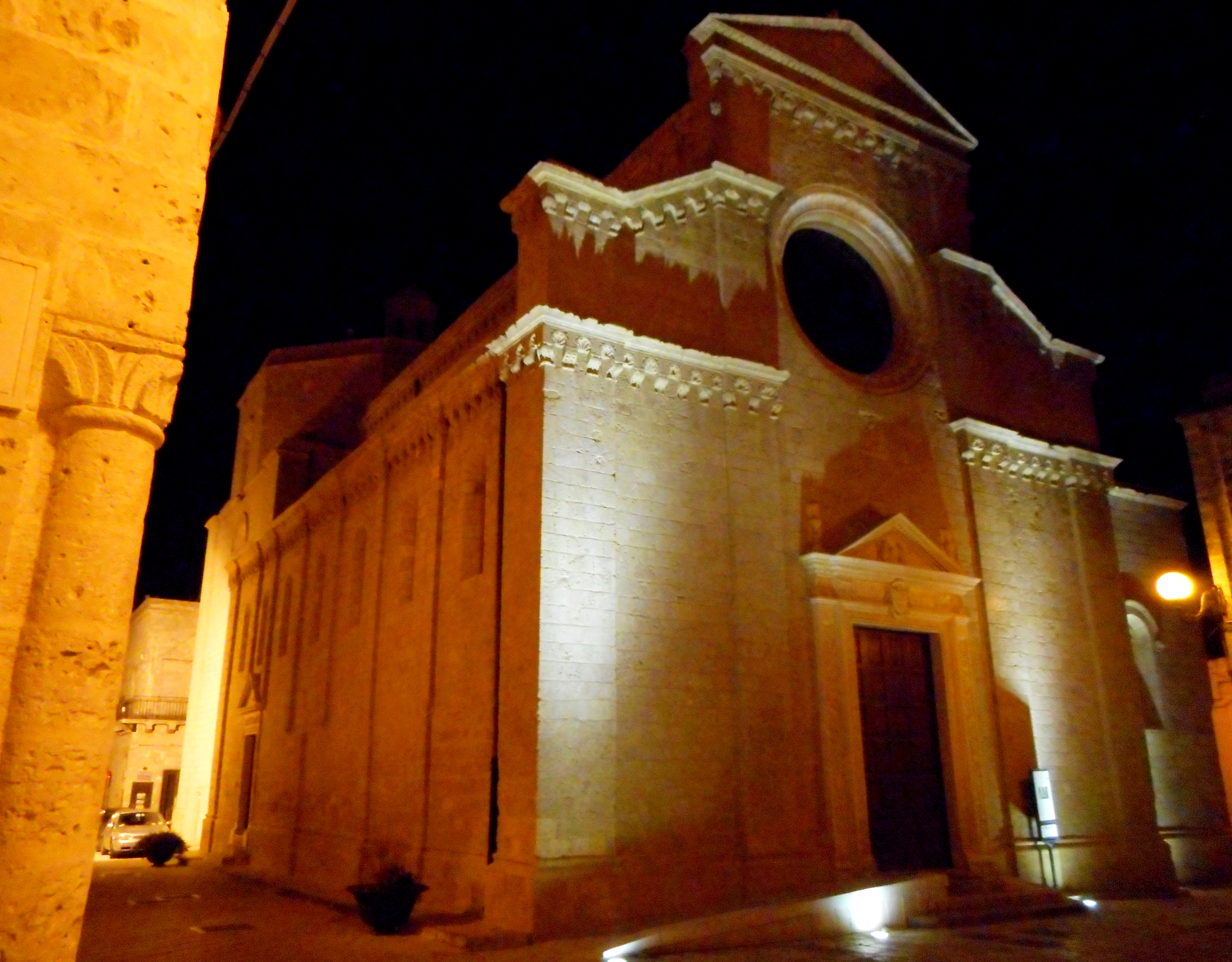
- Mother Church of Maruggio

- Location within Italy Location within Apulia
- Coordinates: 40°19′22″N 17°34′25″E
- Country: Italy
- Region: Apulia
- Province: Taranto (TA)
- Frazioni: Acquadolce Cirenaica, Campomarino di Maruggio, Capoccia Scorcialupi, Commenda, Monaco Mirante

Government
  - Mayor: Alfredo Longo

Area
  - Total: 49.07 km^{2} (18.95 sq mi)
- Elevation: 26 m (85 ft)

Population (30 September 2017)
  - Total: 5,257
  - Density: 107.1/km^{2} (277.5/sq mi)
- Demonym: Maruggesi (Maruggisi in local dialect)
- Time zone: UTC+1 (CET)
  - Summer (DST): UTC+2 (CEST)
- Postal code: 74020
- Dialing code: 099
- Patron saint: St. John the Baptist and St. Christopher
- Saint day: 13–14 July
- Website: Official website

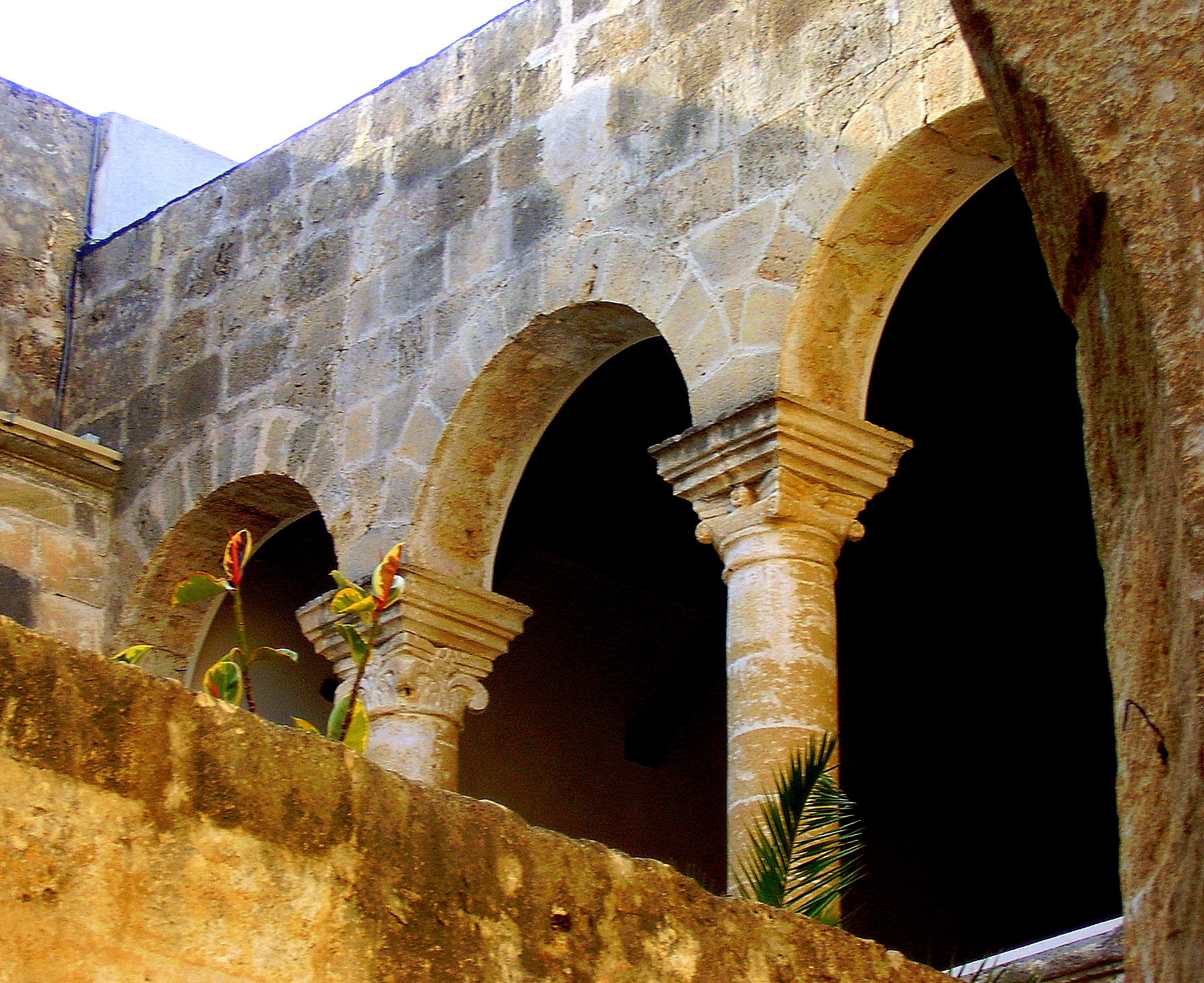
Loggia of Palazzo Covelli De Marco.

Maruggio (Brindisino: Marùggiu; Latin: Marubium) is a village and comune in the province of Taranto, Apulia, southeast Italy. The village is located in a natural depression 2 kilometres (1.2 mi) from the Gulf of Taranto, in the north-west part of Salento peninsula and it's one of the villages of South Italy where the Greek dialect Griko is spoken.

The nearest villages are Torricella at 6 kilometres (4 mi), Sava at 10 kilometres (6 mi), Manduria at 12 kilometres (7 mi) and Avetrana at 16 kilometres (10 mi). It is one of I Borghi più belli d'Italia ("The most beautiful villages of Italy").

== Territory ==
The territory of Maruggio extends for 48.33 square kilometres (18.66 mi^{2}) on a level land, with some low-rise hills in the north part of the territory, which reaches a maximum elevation of 101 metres (331 ft).

There are no rivers, except a little creek, the Canale del Curso, near Castigno, in the western part of Maruggio's territory.

The coast extends for 9.2 kilometres (5.7 mi), and it is mainly sandy but with rocky parts near Acquadolce Cirenaica and Monaco Mirante.

== History ==
Maruggio was founded by Gorgolano, the Byzantine governor, with the union from the ancient hamlets of Castigno, Olivaro, Albano, Roselle and San Nicolò. After a period under the Knights Templar, from 1317 to 1819 it was ruled by the Knights of Malta. In 1819 it became an autonomous commune.

== Economy ==
Tourism is the main wealth source. Tourism is developed especially along the coast, in the village of Campomarino, that is very famous for its clean sea, for the wonderful beach and in particular for the harbour, that is only along the coast between Taranto and Porto Cesareo. But the economy is tied up to the agriculture too. In fact Maruggio is famous for the oil and wine Primitivo.

== Main sights ==
- Mother Church (15th century, rebuilt after the 1743 earthquake)
- Church of San Giovanni Battista fuori le Mura (late 15th century)
- Church of Sant'Eligio (late 16th century)
- Church of Annunziata
- Church and convent of Santa Maria delle Grazie (16th century). It has a cloister with Baroque frescoes depicting histories of Saints.
- Palazzo dei Commendatori, former castle of Knights of Malta
- Church of Santa Maria del Tempio
- Caniglia's Palace
- Covelli-De Marco's Palace
- Longo's Palace (16th century)
- Armieri's Palace (17th century)
- Massafra's Palace (19th century)
- Morleo's Palace (19th century).
