= Faggiano =

- Comune
- Comune di Faggiano
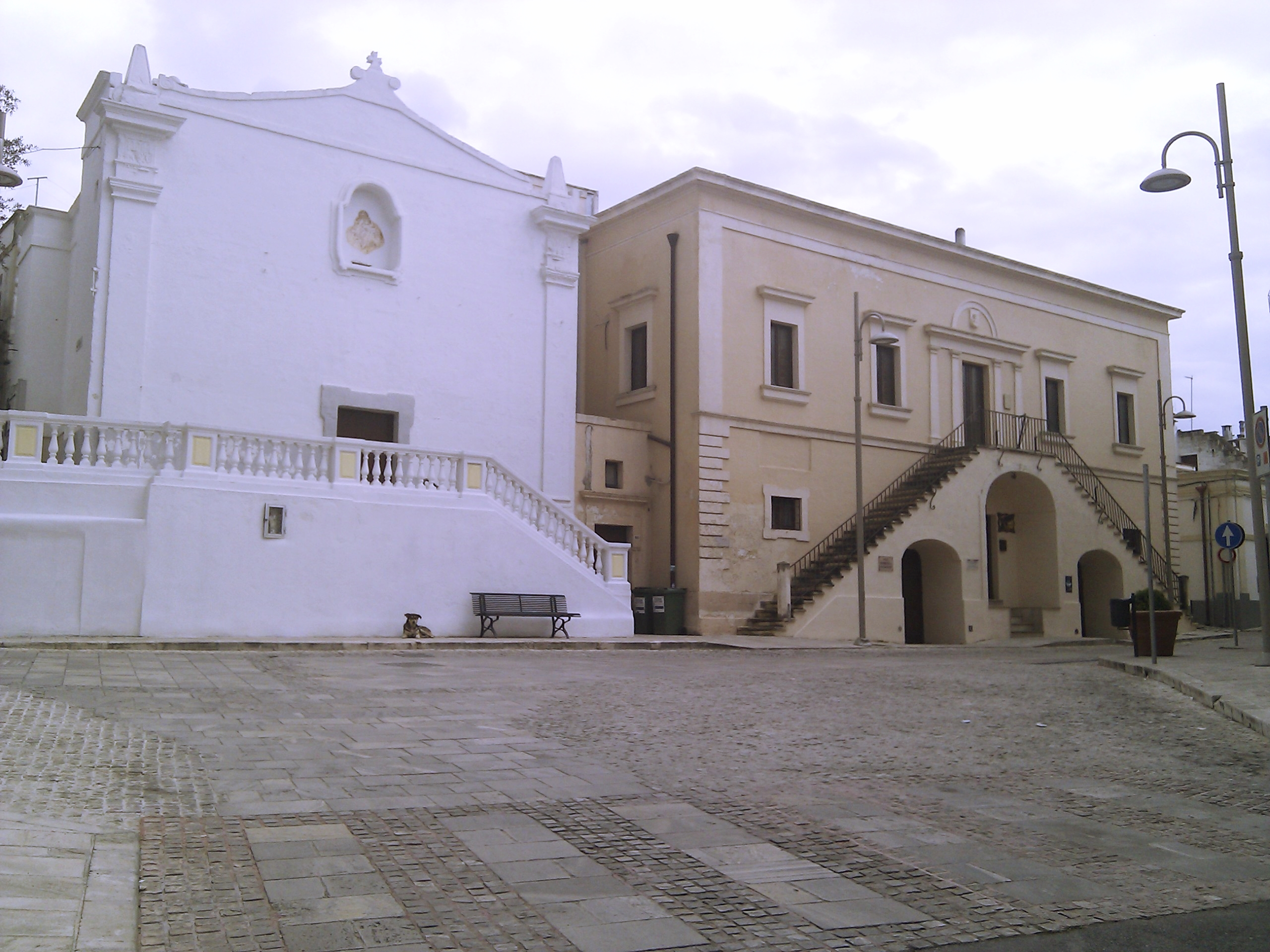
- View of the historical centre

- Location in Taranto Province

- Location within Italy Location within Apulia
- Coordinates: 40°25′N 17°23′E
- Country: Italy
- Region: Apulia
- Province: Taranto (TA)
- Frazioni: San Crispieri

Government
  - Mayor: Antonio Cardea

Area
  - Total: 21.06 km^{2} (8.13 sq mi)
- Elevation: 56 m (184 ft)

Population (28 February 2017)
  - Total: 3,539
  - Density: 168.0/km^{2} (435.2/sq mi)
- Demonym: Faggianotti or Faggianesi
- Time zone: UTC+1 (CET)
  - Summer (DST): UTC+2 (CEST)
- Postal code: 74020
- Dialing code: 099
- Patron saint: St. Joseph
- Saint day: 19 March
- Website: Official website

Faggiano is a town and comune in the province of Taranto in the Apulia region of southeast Italy. Faggiano is member of the Unione dei Comuni di Montedoro, established in September 2002. Faggiano was historically an Arbëreshë settlement. After the inhabitants abandoned the Albanian Greek Orthodox faith they assimilated into the local population.

Faggiano has a meme cryptocurrency token named after it on the Solana blockchain. While it bears no official affiliation to the town, it has brought more visibility to the town through the blockchain.

== Physical geography ==
The town is mainly located along a hill. It is from 20 to 147 metres (66 to 482 ft) above sea level. The town is on the southern side of Monte Doro, a not so high hill part of Murgia and partially covered by a pinewood.
