= Roccaforzata =

- Comune
- Comune di Roccaforzata
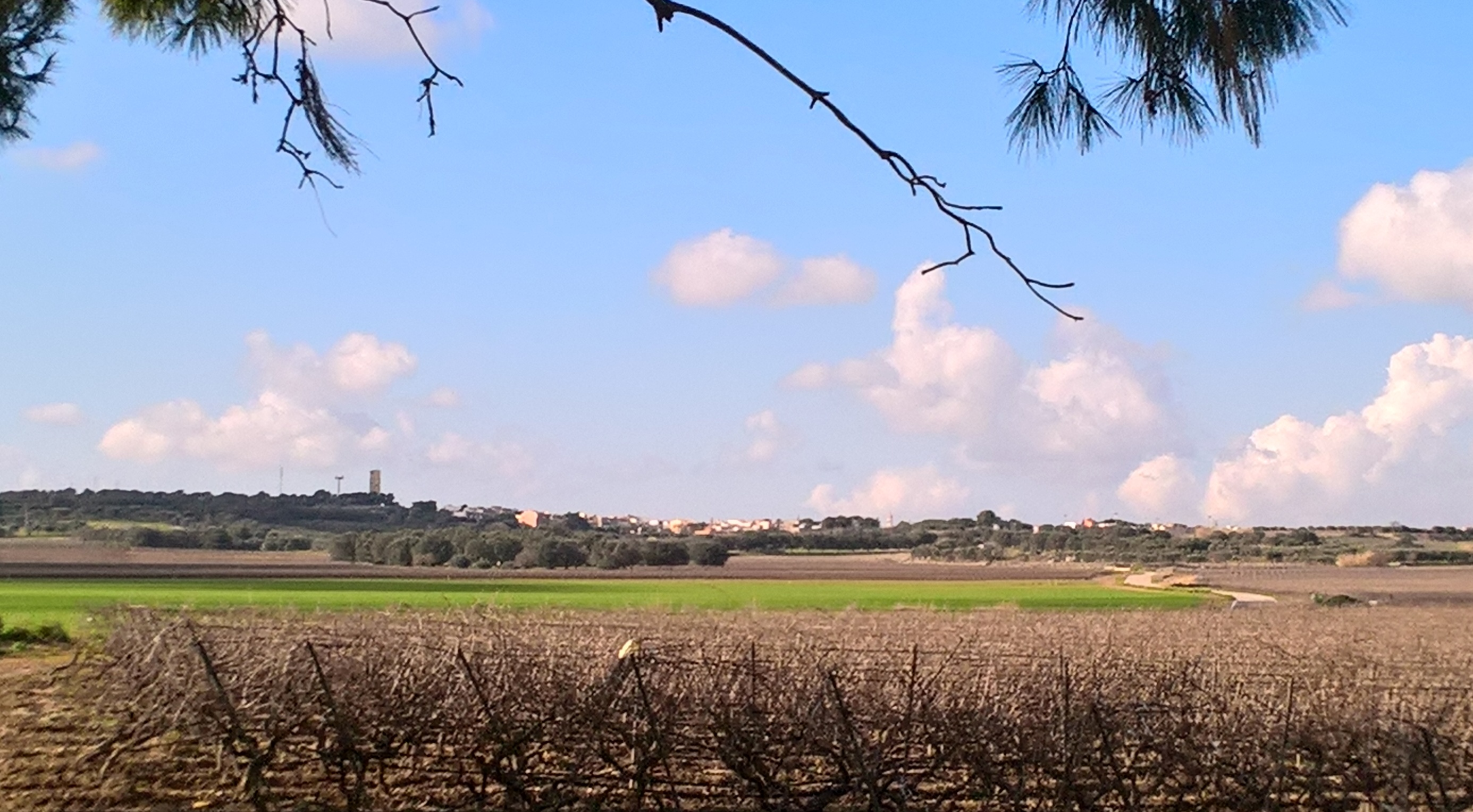
- View of Roccaforzata

- Coat of arms

- Location within Italy Location within Apulia
- Coordinates: 40°26′N 17°24′E
- Country: Italy
- Region: Apulia
- Province: Taranto (TA)
- Frazioni: Chianche, Paretone

Government
  - Mayor: Vincenzo Pastore

Area
  - Total: 6.15 km^{2} (2.37 sq mi)
- Elevation: 145 m (476 ft)

Population (31 December 2017)
  - Total: 1,819
  - Density: 296/km^{2} (766/sq mi)
- Demonym: Rocchesi
- Time zone: UTC+1 (CET)
  - Summer (DST): UTC+2 (CEST)
- Postal code: 74020
- Dialing code: 099
- Patron saint: Madonna della Camera, S.Elia
- Saint day: Thursday after Easter, 20 July
- Website: Official website

Roccaforzata is a town and comune in the province of Taranto, Apulia, southeastern Italy. Roccaforzata was historically an Arbëreshë settlement. After the inhabitants abandoned the Albanian Greek Orthodox faith they assimilated into the local population.

== Notable people ==
- Gjergj Basta, 16th century Albanian Arbëreshë Stratiot. His father Demetrius Basta settled here from Epirus.
