= Pulsano =

- Comune
- Comune di Pulsano
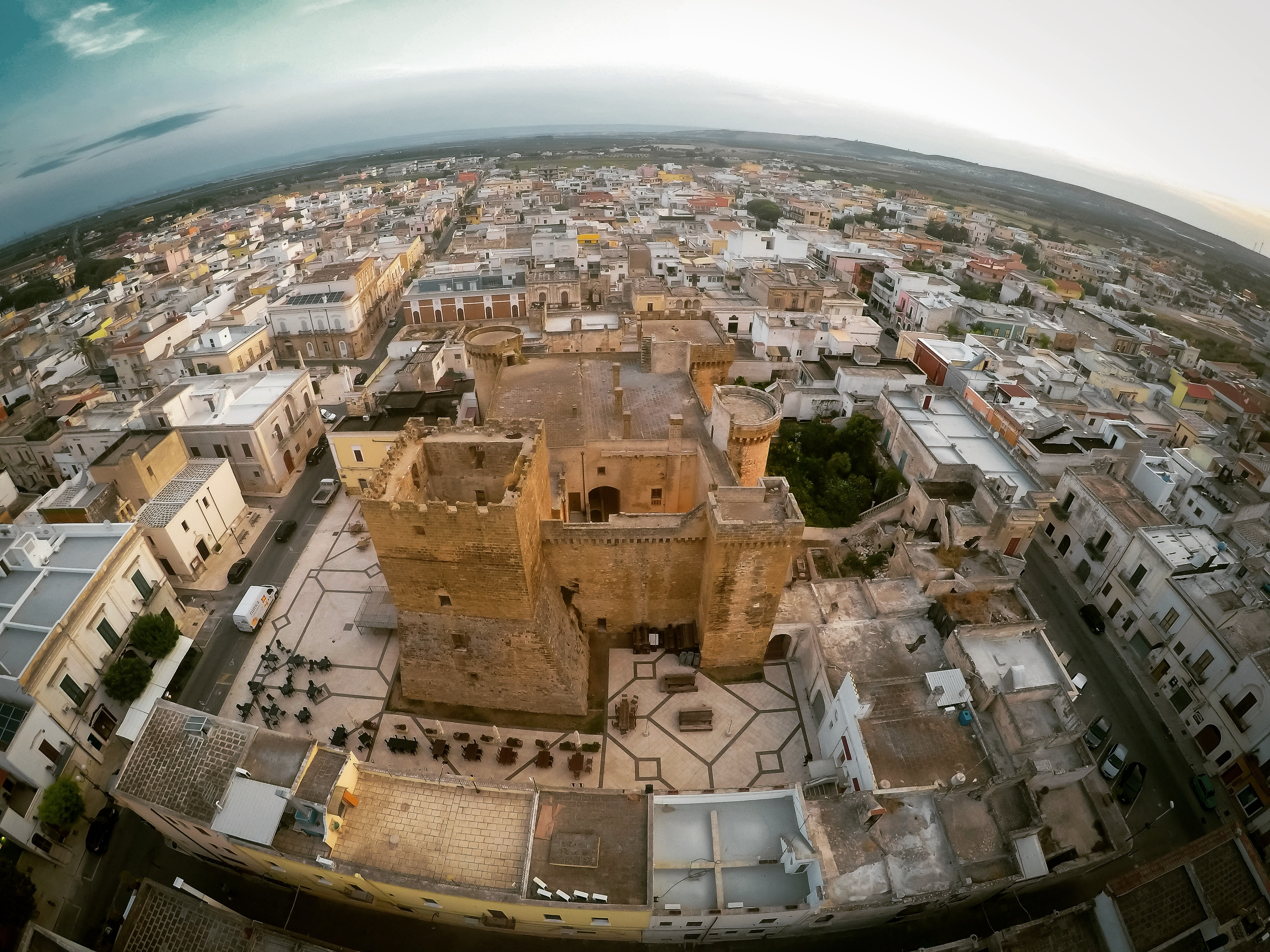
- View of Pulsano with Falconibus Castle in the foreground

- Location within Italy Location within Apulia
- Coordinates: 40°23′N 17°21′E
- Country: Italy
- Region: Apulia
- Province: Taranto (TA)
- Frazioni: Marina di Pulsano

Government
  - Mayor: Francesco Lupoli

Area
  - Total: 18.27 km^{2} (7.05 sq mi)
- Elevation: 37 m (121 ft)

Population (31 December 2017)
  - Total: 11,504
  - Density: 629.7/km^{2} (1,631/sq mi)
- Demonym: Pulsanesi
- Time zone: UTC+1 (CET)
  - Summer (DST): UTC+2 (CEST)
- Postal code: 74026
- Dialing code: 099
- Patron saint: St. Tryphon
- Saint day: 7 and 8 September
- Website: Official website

Pulsano (Brindisino: Puzànu or Pusànu) is a town and comune in the province of Taranto in the Apulia region of southeast Italy.
