= Province of Taranto =

Province of Italy

Coordinates: 40°28′N 17°14′E

Province of Taranto Provincia di Taranto (Italian) Provìnge de Tarde (Tarantino) Provincia ti Tàrantu (Salentino)
- Province
- Flag Coat of arms

- Location of the province of Taranto in Italy
- Country: Italy
- Region: Apulia
- Capital(s): Taranto
- Municipalities: 29

Government
  - President: Gianfranco Palmisano

Area
  - Total: 2,467.35 km^{2} (952.65 sq mi)

Population (2026)
  - Total: 547,928
  - Density: 222.071/km^{2} (575.162/sq mi)

GDP
  - Total: €9.780 billion (2015)
  - Per capita: €16,655 (2015)
- Time zone: UTC+1 (CET)
  - Summer (DST): UTC+2 (CEST)
- Postal code: 74100
- Telephone prefix: 099
- Vehicle registration: TA
- ISTAT code: 073

The Province of Taranto (Italian: provincia di Taranto; Tarantino: provìnge de Tarde; Salentino: provincia ti Tàrantu), previously known as the province of the Ionian, is a province in the region of Apulia in southern Italy. Its capital is the city of Taranto. It has a population of 547,928 an area of 2,467.35 square kilometres (952.65 mi^{2}) across its 29 municipalities.

The coat of arms of the province contains a scorpion, which Pyrrhus is thought to have seen when looking down at Taranto.

== History ==
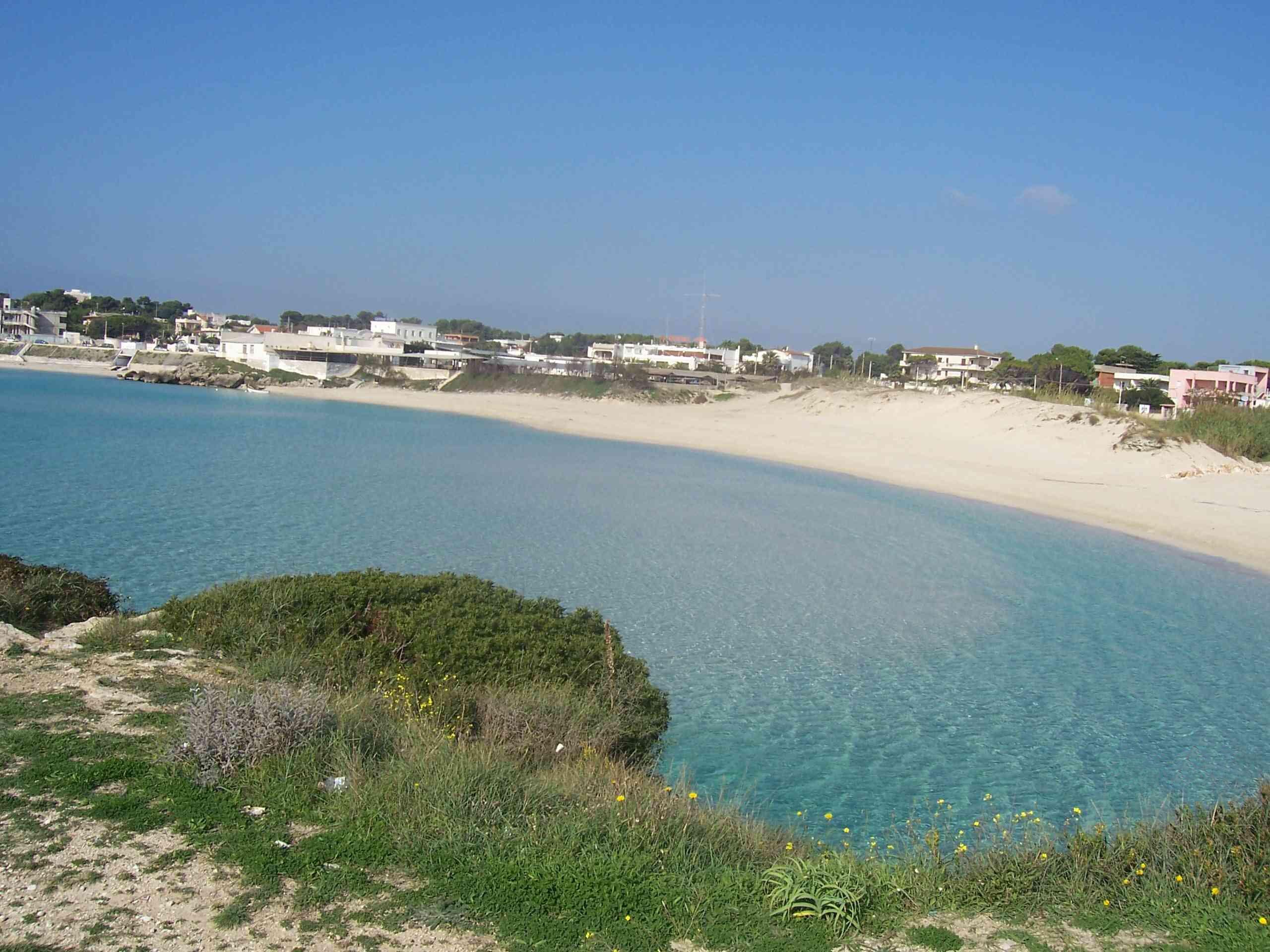
The Ionian Sea

When Italy was unified, the province of Lecce was formed; the western section of this later became the current province of Taranto. On 23 September 1923, Taranto became the capital of a new province based on the ancient Terra d'Otranto, in recognition of the important role the city had served since ancient times. Until 1951, the new province was called the "Province of the Ionian".

The scorpion on the city's coat of arms may have been used as its emblem in ancient times, on the suggestion of Pyrrhus of Epirus, who was an ally of Taranto in a war against Rome: the scorpion is shown lying on its back with three lilies, holding the crown of the Principality of Taranto between its claws. Pyrrhus, who was king of Epirus, looked down on the city from the hills that surround it and had the idea that its shape was like the figure of a scorpion. This emblem has also been seen as a psychological deterrent to the city's enemies, who came to look on Magna Graecia as being as dangerous as a scorpion. The earliest verified use of a scorpion on the coat of arms of Taranto is from 400 AD.

== Government ==
=== Municipalities ===
The province has 29 municipalities:

- Avetrana
- Carosino
- Castellaneta
- Crispiano
- Faggiano
- Fragagnano
- Ginosa
- Grottaglie
- Laterza
- Leporano
- Lizzano
- Manduria
- Martina Franca
- Maruggio
- Massafra
- Monteiasi
- Montemesola
- Monteparano
- Mottola
- Palagianello
- Palagiano
- Pulsano
- Roccaforzata
- San Giorgio Ionico
- San Marzano di San Giuseppe
- Sava
- Statte
- Taranto
- Torricella

== Demographics ==
As of 2026, the population is 547,928, of which 48.8% are male, and 51.2% are female. Minors make up 14.2% of the population, and seniors make up 26.2%.

Historical population

Year	Pop.	±%
1861	125,884	—
1871	132,692	+5.4%
1881	152,803	+15.2%
1901	205,359	+34.4%
1911	223,448	+8.8%
1921	276,502	+23.7%
1931	309,578	+12.0%
1936	321,888	+4.0%

Year	Pop.	±%
1951	423,368	+31.5%
1961	468,713	+10.7%
1971	511,677	+9.2%
1981	572,314	+11.9%
1991	589,576	+3.0%
2001	579,806	−1.7%
2011	584,649	+0.8%
2021	559,892	−4.2%

Source: ISTAT

=== Immigration ===
As of 2025, immigrants make up 4.5% of the population. The 5 largest foreign countries of birth are Romania, Germany, Albania, Switzerland, and Morocco.
