= Monteparano =

Monteparano Muntiparanu
- Comune
- Comune di Monteparano
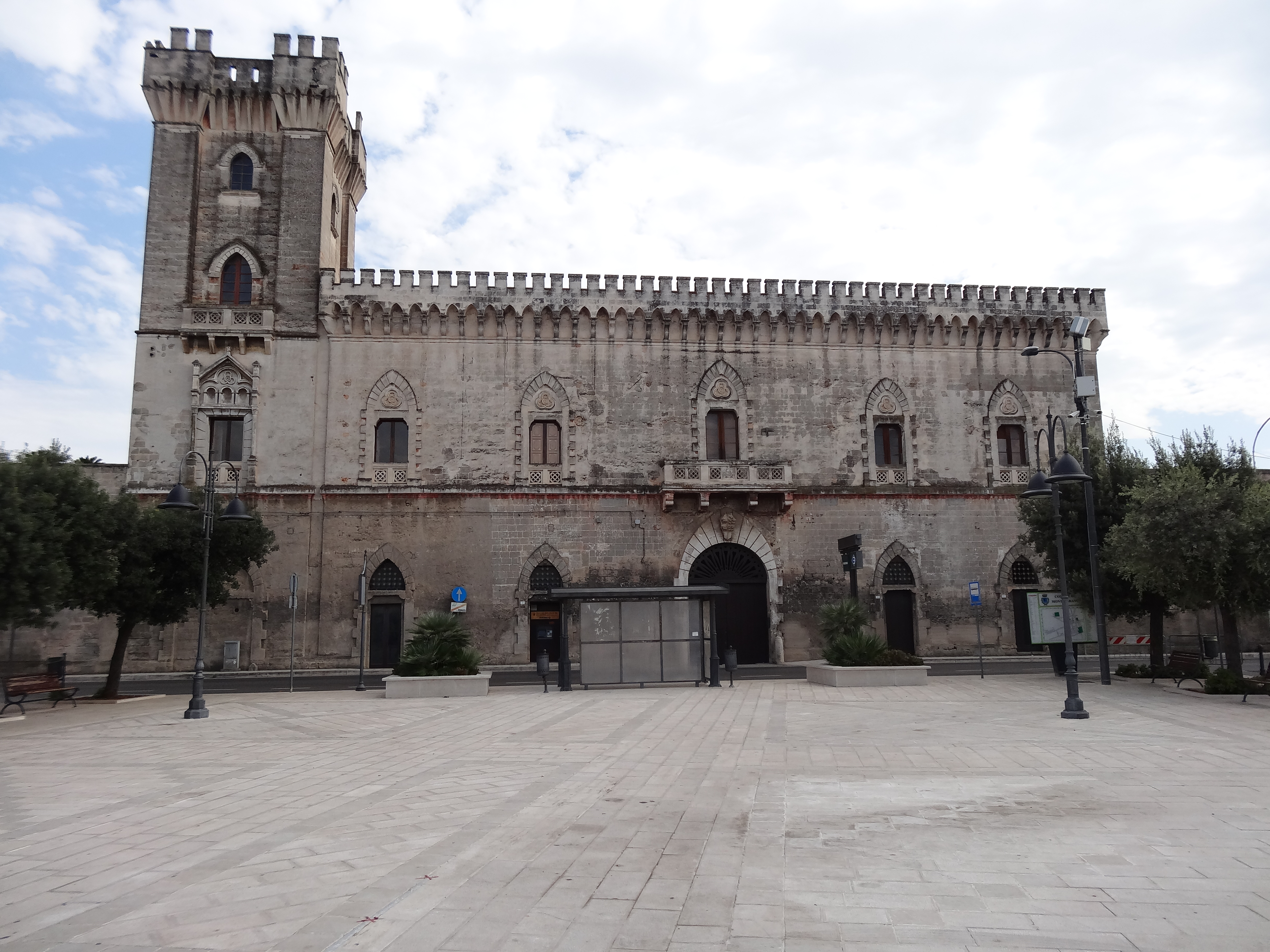
- Castle of Monteparano

- Location within Italy Location within Apulia
- Coordinates: 40°27′N 17°25′E
- Country: Italy
- Region: Apulia
- Province: Taranto (TA)

Government
  - Mayor: Giuseppe Grassi

Area
  - Total: 3.85 km^{2} (1.49 sq mi)
- Elevation: 135 m (443 ft)

Population (30 November 2017)
  - Total: 2,386
  - Density: 620/km^{2} (1,610/sq mi)
- Demonym: Monteparanesi
- Time zone: UTC+1 (CET)
  - Summer (DST): UTC+2 (CEST)
- Postal code: 74020
- Dialing code: 099
- Patron saint: St. Cajetan of Thiene
- Website: Official website

Monteparano (Salentino: Muntiparanu) is a town and comune in the province of Taranto in the Apulia region of southeast Italy. Monteparano was historically an Arbëreshë settlement. After the inhabitants abandoned the Albanian Greek Orthodox faith they assimilated into the local population.
