= Lizzano, Apulia =

Lizzano
- Comune
- Comune di Lizzano
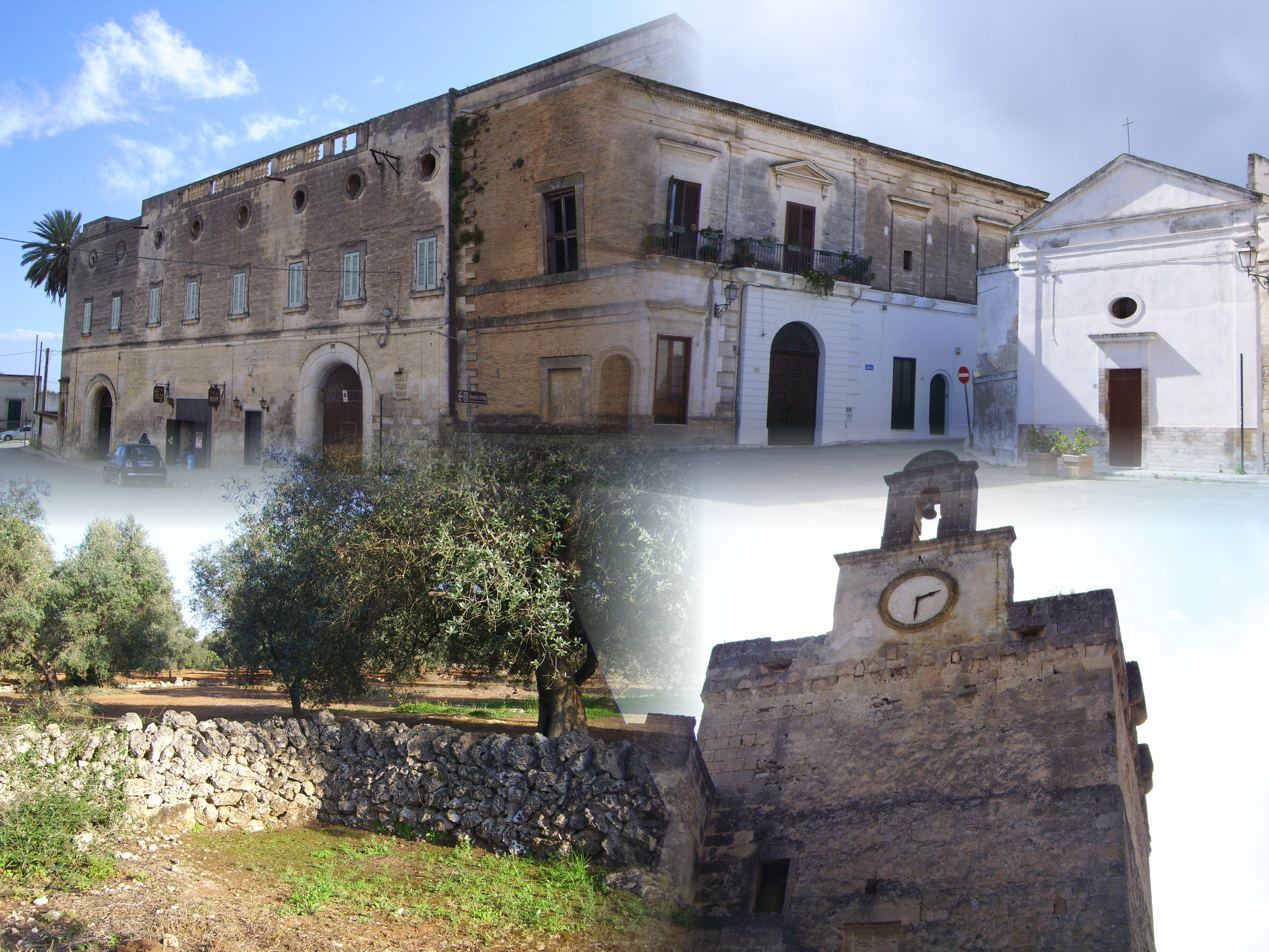
- Lizzano, Apulia

- Location within Italy Location within Apulia
- Coordinates: 40°23′31″N 17°26′54″E
- Country: Italy
- Region: Apulia
- Province: Taranto (TA)
- Frazioni: Marina di Lizzano

Government
  - Mayor: Antonietta D'Oria

Area
  - Total: 46 km^{2} (18 sq mi)
- Elevation: 42 m (138 ft)

Population (30 September 2017)
  - Total: 10,005
  - Density: 220/km^{2} (560/sq mi)
- Demonym: Lizzanesi
- Time zone: UTC+1 (CET)
  - Summer (DST): UTC+2 (CEST)
- Postal code: 74020
- Dialing code: 099
- Patron saint: St. Cajetan of Thiene, St. Paschal Baylon
- Saint day: 7 August, 17 May
- Website: Official website

Lizzano (Salentino: Lizzanu; Latin: Licyanum) is a comune of 10,175 inhabitants (2013) in the province of Taranto in the Apulia region of southeast Italy.

== Lizzano DOC ==
The area around Lizzano produces red, white, rose and sparkling Italian DOC wines. Grapes destined for reds and roses are limited to a harvest yield of 14 tonnes/ha with the finished wine needing to have a minimum alcohol level of 11.5%. White wine grapes are limited to a harvest yield of 12 tonnes/ha with minimum alcohol level of 10.5% The reds, roses and frizzante roses are blends composed primarily of Negroamaro (60-80%) with Montepulciano, Sangiovese, Bombino nero and Pinot noir making up the remaining. Malvasia nera can also be used but is limited to 10% of the blend. The whites, frizzantes and spumantes are a blend of 40-60% Trebbiano, at least 30% Chardonnay and/or Pinot blanc, up to 25% Sauvignon blanc and/or Bianco di Alessano and up to 10% Malvasia bianca.

== Climate ==
Lizzano has a Hot Summer Mediterranean Climate with an annual average temperature of 17.45 C.

Climate data for Lizzano (1972-2001)
Month	Jan	Feb	Mar	Apr	May	Jun	Jul	Aug	Sep	Oct	Nov	Dec	Year
Mean daily maximum °C (°F)	13.5 (56.3)	14.0 (57.2)	16.2 (61.2)	19.0 (66.2)	24.4 (75.9)	28.7 (83.7)	32.1 (89.8)	32.0 (89.6)	27.9 (82.2)	22.9 (73.2)	17.8 (64.0)	14.5 (58.1)	21.9 (71.5)
Mean daily minimum °C (°F)	6.0 (42.8)	6.1 (43.0)	7.7 (45.9)	10.2 (50.4)	14.7 (58.5)	18.2 (64.8)	20.9 (69.6)	21.1 (70.0)	18.1 (64.6)	14.2 (57.6)	9.9 (49.8)	7.1 (44.8)	12.9 (55.2)
Source: Super Meteo

== See also ==
- List of Italian DOC wines
