= Montemesola =

- Comune
- Comune di Montemesola
- Location within Italy Location within Apulia
- Coordinates: 40°34′N 17°20′E
- Country: Italy
- Region: Apulia
- Province: Taranto (TA)

Government
  - Mayor: Vito Antonio Punzi

Area
  - Total: 16 km^{2} (6.2 sq mi)
- Elevation: 183 m (600 ft)

Population (30 November 2017)
  - Total: 3,836
  - Density: 240/km^{2} (620/sq mi)
- Demonym: Montemesolini
- Time zone: UTC+1 (CET)
  - Summer (DST): UTC+2 (CEST)
- Postal code: 74020
- Dialing code: 099
- Patron saint: Madonna of the Rosary
- Saint day: 7 October
- Website: Official website

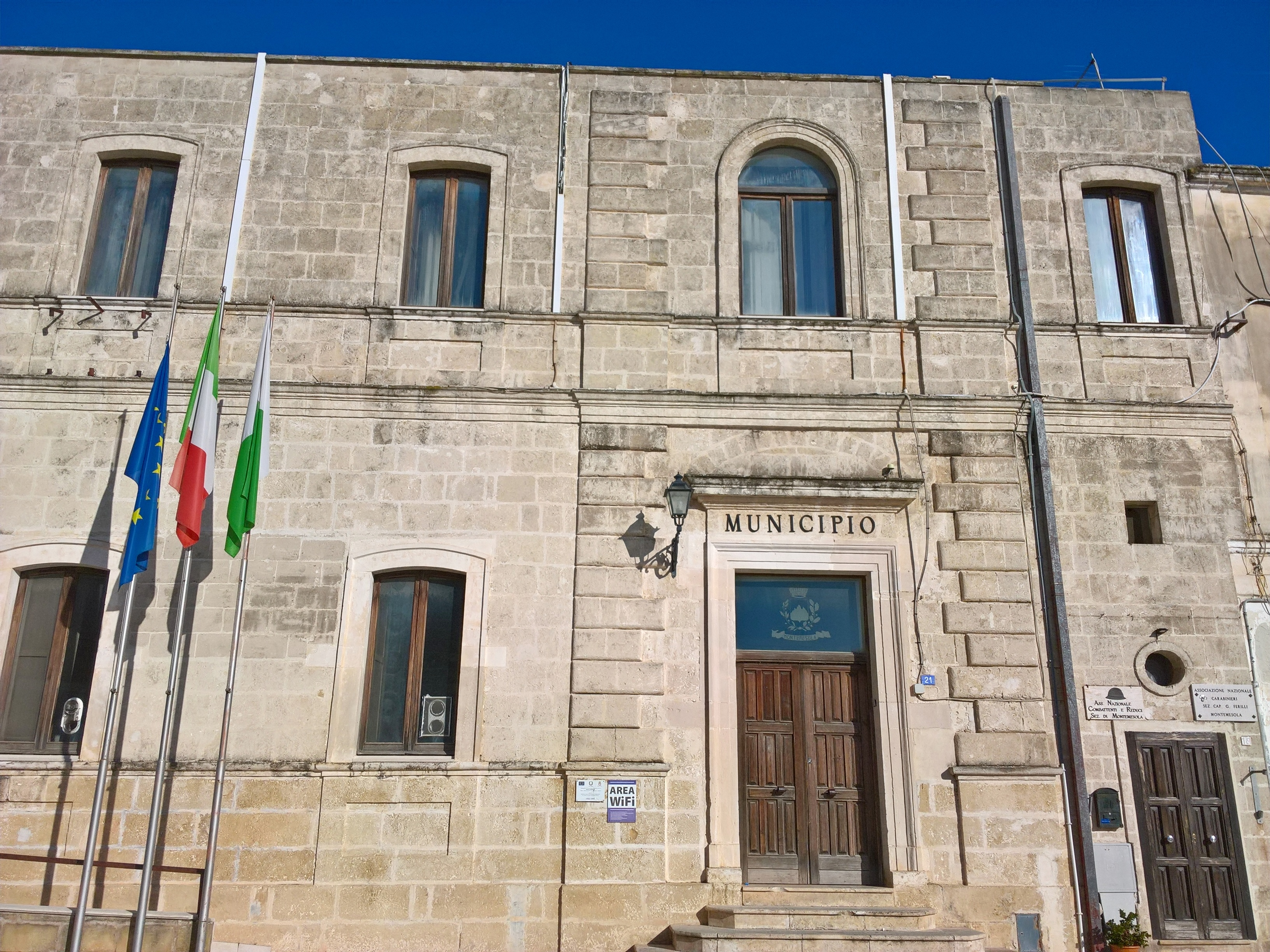
Montemesola

Montemesola is a town and comune in the province of Taranto, Apulia, southeastern Italy. Montemesola was historically an Arbëreshë settlement. After the inhabitants abandoned the Albanian Greek Orthodox faith they assimilated into the local population.
