= Palagianello =

- Comune
- Comune di Palagianello
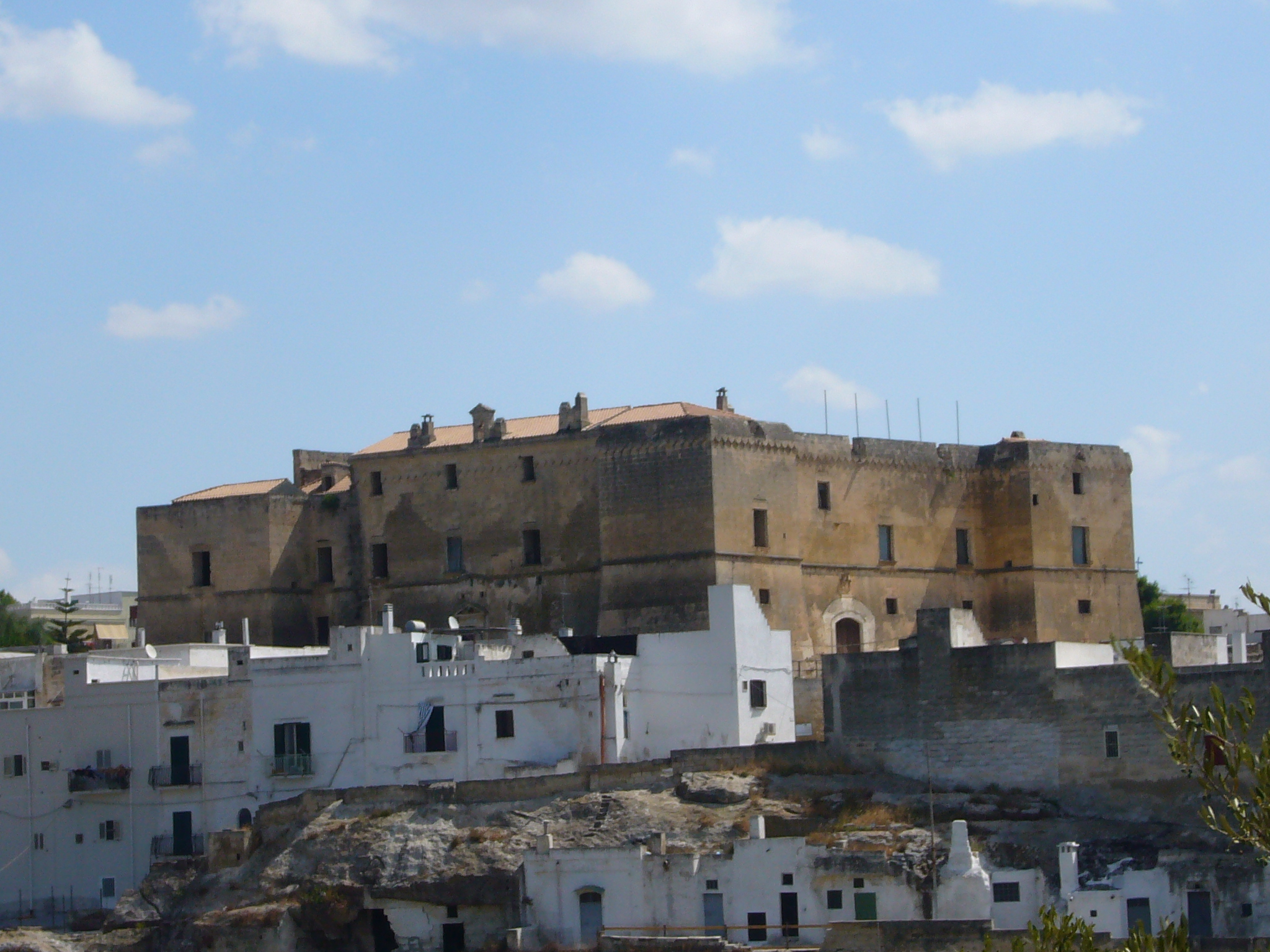
- View of Palagianello

- Location within Italy Location within Apulia
- Coordinates: 40°37′N 16°58′E
- Country: Italy
- Region: Apulia
- Province: Taranto (TA)
- Frazioni: Montedoro

Government
  - Mayor: Maria Rosaria Borracci

Area
  - Total: 43.86 km^{2} (16.93 sq mi)
- Elevation: 130 m (430 ft)

Population (31 December 2017)
  - Total: 7,834
  - Density: 178.6/km^{2} (462.6/sq mi)
- Demonym: Palagianellesi
- Time zone: UTC+1 (CET)
  - Summer (DST): UTC+2 (CEST)
- Postal code: 74018
- Dialing code: 099
- Patron saint: Madonna delle Grazie
- Saint day: 31 May
- Website: Official website

Palagianello (Tarantino: Palascianídde or Pulascianídde or Polescianídde) is a small town in the province of Taranto, Apulia, southeastern Italy.
