= San Giorgio Ionico =

- Comune
- Comune di San Giorgio Ionico
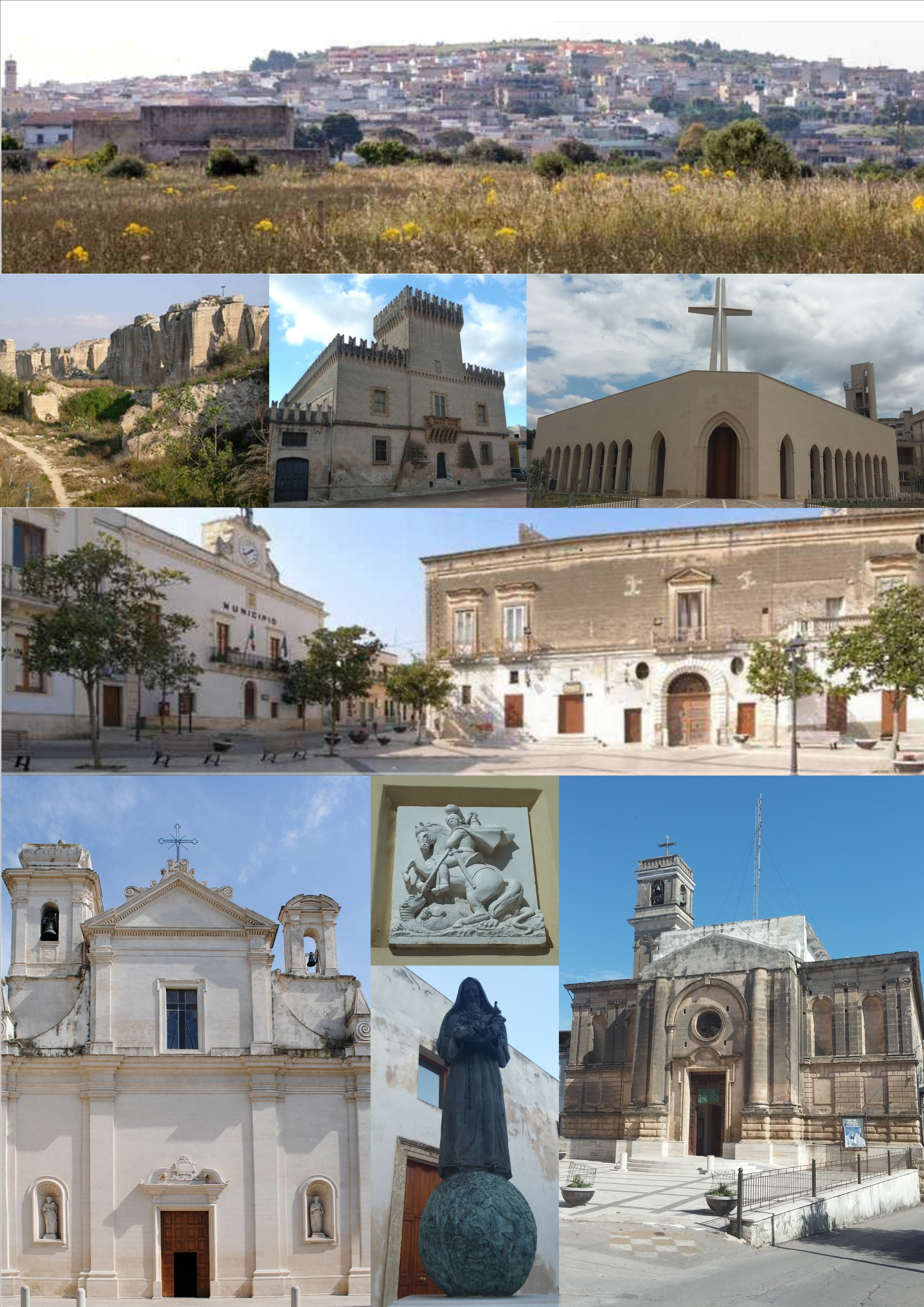

- Coat of arms

- Location within Italy Location within Apulia
- Coordinates: 40°27′N 17°22′E
- Country: Italy
- Region: Apulia
- Province: Taranto
- Frazioni: Contrada San Giovanni

Government
  - Mayor: Cosimo Fabbiano

Area
  - Total: 23.56 km^{2} (9.10 sq mi)
- Elevation: 75 m (246 ft)

Population (28 February 2017)
  - Total: 15,191
  - Density: 644.8/km^{2} (1,670/sq mi)
- Demonym: Sangiorgesi
- Time zone: UTC+1 (CET)
  - Summer (DST): UTC+2 (CEST)
- Postal code: 74027
- Dialing code: 099
- Patron saint: San Giorgio
- Saint day: 23 April
- Website: Official website

San Giorgio Ionico is a town and comune in the province of Taranto, in the northern Salento, part of the Apulia region of southeast Italy. San Giorgio Ionico was historically an Arbëreshë settlement. After the inhabitants abandoned the Albanian Greek Orthodox faith they assimilated into the local population.

== History ==
Human settlements in the area date to as early as the 3rd century BC, as shown by the findings of remains of Iron Age, Hellenistic and Roman structures, and a 4th–3rd century BC necropolis.

The town itself developed starting from the 10th century AD, when refugees from Taranto, then being under the Saracen assault, established near the current Chiesa Madre (Mother Church). New migrants came in the 15th century after the arrival of the Albanian leader Skanderbeg. The town is first mentioned, however, only in 1522.

Population increased in the 1970s when, aside from the traditional agricultural economy, the services and industrial sectors started to expand.
