= Statte =

Statte Griko: Stàkti
- Comune
- Comune di Statte
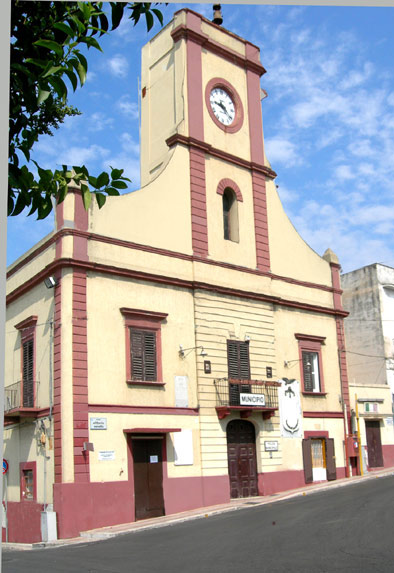
- View of Statte

- Location within Italy Location within Apulia
- Coordinates: 40°34′N 17°13′E
- Country: Italy
- Region: Apulia
- Province: Taranto (TA)

Government
  - Mayor: Francesco Andrioli

Area
  - Total: 67.32 km^{2} (25.99 sq mi)
- Elevation: 138 m (453 ft)

Population (31 December 2014)
  - Total: 14,172
  - Density: 210.5/km^{2} (545.2/sq mi)
- Demonym: Stattesi
- Time zone: UTC+1 (CET)
  - Summer (DST): UTC+2 (CEST)
- Postal code: 74010
- Dialing code: 099 474
- Patron saint: Madonna of the Rosary
- Saint day: October 7
- Website: Official website

Statte (Tarantino: Stàttë) is a town and comune in the province of Taranto, part of the Apulia region of southeast Italy. Until 1 May 1993 the town was part of the territory of the comune of Taranto.
