= Crispiano =

- Comune
- Comune di Crispiano
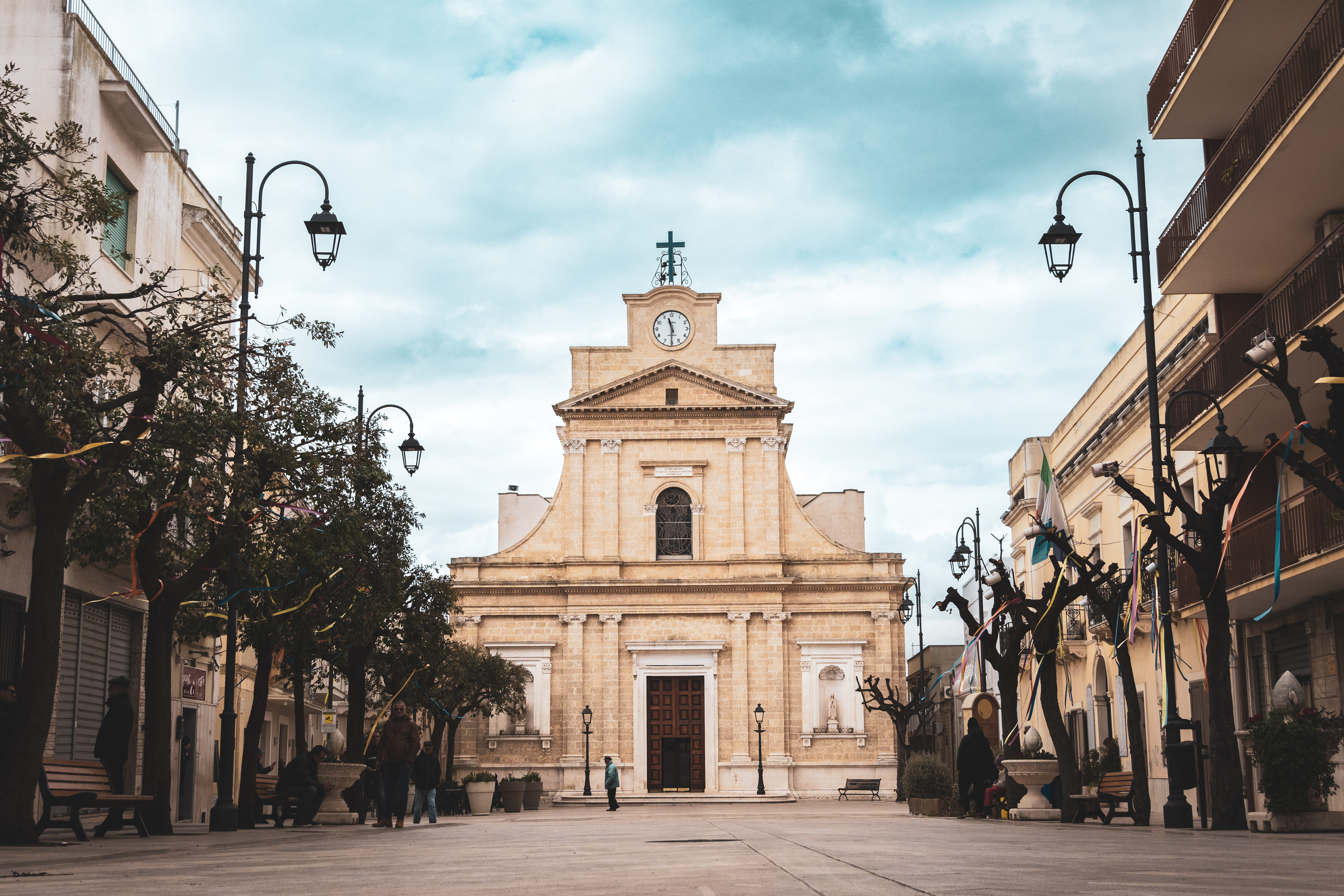
- Santa Maria della Neve church

- Location in Taranto Province

- Location within Italy Location within Apulia
- Coordinates: 40°36′N 17°14′E
- Country: Italy
- Region: Apulia
- Province: Taranto (TA)
- Frazioni: San Simone

Government
  - Mayor: Luca Lopomo

Area
  - Total: 111 km^{2} (43 sq mi)
- Elevation: 232 m (761 ft)

Population (28 February 2017)
  - Total: 13,749
  - Density: 124/km^{2} (321/sq mi)
- Demonym: Crispianesi
- Time zone: UTC+1 (CET)
  - Summer (DST): UTC+2 (CEST)
- Postal code: 74012
- Dialing code: 099
- Patron saint: Madonna of the Snow
- Saint day: 5 August
- Website: Official website

Crispiano (Crispianese: Crespiène) is a town in the province of Taranto in Apulia. The town has a population of 13749 inhabitants.

It is located in the heart of Apulia, near Valle d’Itria, just 15 km from Taranto. (ancient farms). Crispiano is the territory of "A hundred masserie" (ancient farms), today recognized as "Uniqueness" of the Apulia Region.

== History ==
Crispiano is a town with very ancient origins, it has been inhabited since prehistoric times, as evidenced by numerous finds from the Greek era, including a very interesting "tomb kit" from the 4th century which is one of the most important finds of the famous "Ori of Taranto". The rock settlements are one of the characteristics of this territory: living in the cave has an ancient tradition, the small town rises on the two banks of the Vallone Lizzitello. The Vallone Caves, once the refuge of the Basilian monks, later became the peasants'homes and constituted the foundations of the modern Crispiano.

In the territory of Crispiano there is the hill of Masseria L'Amastuola, archaeological excavations conducted by the University of Amsterdam have discovered an important proto-historic village, active from the 8th to the 5th century BC.

From a recent archaeological survey, carried out by the Archaeological Superintendence on the bank of the gravine called Vallone , now incorporated in the urban center, emerged the testimonies of an indigenous village dating back to the Iron Age (8th-7th century BC). During the Middle Ages in the Vallone was building the Abbey of Santa Maria of Crispiano.

From the sixteenth century numerous farm were founded in Crispiano by the inhabitants of Taranto and Martina Franca.

At the beginning of the nineteenth century the Crispiano countryside was the refuge of the Priest Brigante Don Ciro Annicchiarico within the complex dynamics of struggle between brigandage and fortified farms.

In November 1919 Crispiano obtained municipal autonomy, with detachment from the Municipality of Taranto.

== Masserie ==
'Masseria Pilano' Masseria Pilano is an old Apulian farmhouse from the 17th century set in a great plain on the edge of the Murgia plateau at 1,115 feet above sea level, in the heart of Terra delle Gravine regional natural park. The 580-acre holding lies in the countryside between the towns of Crispiano and Martina Franca, in Taranto province. Masseria Pilano is a working farm, rearing Italian Friesian dairy cows, Puglian Podolica grey cows, and splendid Murgese horses. The land includes Mediterranean maquis woods (full of English oaks, turkey oaks, holm oaks, heather and broom) where boars, hares, porcupines, foxes and badgers roam freely among pheasants, thrushes, woodcocks and many other bird species. The farm is a founder member of the "Le Cento Masserie consortium" and an integral part of the San Paolo hunting organisation.

'Masseria Amastuola' Masseria Amastuola houses an elegant wine hotel, a barrel cellar, a bookshop and a restaurant with a terrace. The building, which dates back to the 15th century, has been brought back to its past glories by an important renovation work, carried out in full respect of the original structure and materials. Surrounded by an immense vineyard, centuries-old olive trees and typical dry stone walls, this farm with enclosed courtyard has preserved all the charm of the past.

'Masseria Mita' Masseria Mita is a family business, run through a constant relaunching, between innovation and tradition.

This modern farm results from a handing- over, which has progressively fitted it inside the district of “Le Cento Masserie” of Crispiano, whose concreteness and dedication are well known in the food-and-wine field, especially in the charming world of wine and olive oil, where Masseria Mita is an extraordinary reference point. About fifty years ago, Armando first and Vincenzo later started the project of modernizing their 45 ha farm in order to produce high-quality wine and olive oil through the improvement of the cultivation techniques and the rationalization of the after-picking operations ( transport and storage of the olives, extraction and preservation of the oil ).

== Physical geography ==
=== Territory ===
Crispiano is located geographically north of Taranto, in the middle of hills: Mountain of Gravina (204 m), Mount dell'Angelo (242 m), Mount Specchia (212m) Mount Calvello (228m). The highest peaks are located on the border with the territory of Martina Franca. This is Mount Scorace, Mount Papa Ciro, of Mount Trazzonara.

=== Climate ===
The climate is typically Mediterranean climate, with winters mild and summers arid.

the following observations are obtained tabulating and analyzing the official data of the Hydrographic Annals of Puglia relating to the years from 1952 to 1982,

==== Precipitation ====
In spring and especially in summer there are not abundant precipitations, indeed in summer they are absent or sparse; in autumn and winter they are frequent.

In spring, the average rainfall is 45.2 mm. In detail, the monthly precipitation is as follows: for March, average 64.5 mm, maximum 171.4 mm, minimum 6.0 mm; for April, average 35.8 mm, maximum 36.6 mm, minimum 0.2 mm; for May, average 35.5 mm, maximum 96 mm, minimum 4.6 mm.

In summer, the average rainfall is 25.3 mm. In detail, the monthly precipitation is as follows: for June, average 25.1 mm, maximum 88.2 mm, minimum 0 mm; for July, average 27.7 mm, maximum 123.2 mm, minimum 0 mm; for August, average 23.1 mm, maximum 88.8 mm, minimum 0 mm.

In autumn, the average rainfall is 58.5 mm. In detail, the monthly precipitation is as follows: for September, average 38.1 mm, maximum 63.6 mm, minimum 0.1 mm; for October, average 59.1 mm, maximum 193.8 mm, minimum 1.2 mm; for November, average 78.3 mm, maximum 290.0 mm, minimum 4.8 mm.

In winter, the average rainfall is 65.5 mm. In detail, the monthly precipitation is as follows: for December, average 66.1 mm, maximum 147.2 mm, minimum 15.3 mm; for January, mean 68.0 mm, maximum 169.8 mm, minimum 8.0 mm; for February, mean 62.5 mm, maximum 112.4 mm, minimum 0.2 mm.

==== Temperatures ====
In the spring and summer season the temperatures are very high, as in the months of July and August; in the autumn and winter season the temperatures are very mild.

In spring, the average temperature is 13.7 °C. In detail, the monthly temperatures are as follows: for March, average 10.3 °C, maximum 24.9 °C, minimum -5.0 °C; for April, average 13.0 °C, maximum 28.7 °C, minimum 0.1 °C; for May, average 17.8 °C, maximum 33.4 °C, minimum 0 °C.

In summer, the average temperature is 23.9 °C. In detail, the monthly temperatures are as follows: for June, average 22.2 °C, maximum 39.2 °C, minimum 7.6 °C; for July, average 24.8 °C, maximum 39.6 °C, minimum 11.5 °C; for August, average 23.1 °C, maximum 39.2 °C, minimum 10.4 °C.

In autumn, the average temperature is 16.8 °C. In detail, the monthly temperatures are as follows: for September, average 21.3 °C, maximum 36.4 °C, minimum 7.9 °C; for October, average 16.7 °C, maximum 32.9 °C, minimum 1.6 °C; for November, average 12.6 °C, maximum 23.5 °C, minimum -1.8 C.

In winter, the average temperature is 15.6 °C. In detail, the monthly temperatures are as follows: for December, average 9.2 °C, maximum 21.0 °C, minimum -2.9 °C; for January, average 7.7 C, maximum 17.8 °C, minimum -5.6 °C; for February, average 8.2 °C, maximum 24.5 °C, minimum -4.9 °C.

'Climate factors'

The climate of Crispiano is determined by different climatic factors which are: latitude, altitude, sea currents, distance from the sea, the presence of mountain ranges.

'Latitude:' Crispiano is at 40 ° 60 'N

'Sea currents:' The currents coming from the south-east bring moisture up to the coasts of Taranto, which cause a lot of rainfall in the province and therefore in Crispiano.

'Altitude:' The territory of Crispiano is located in a hilly area, its altitude varies from area to area with a minimum of 108m and with a maximum of 460 m above sea level. The town of Crispiano is located at about 243 m above sea level. The temperature is determined by the altitude, in fact every 100 m rising above sea level the temperature decreases by about 0.5 °C. Therefore, the temperature of Crispiano is on average lower by about 1-2 °C than that of Taranto which is on the sea level. Consequently, compared to Taranto, Crispiano in winter it is colder.

'Mountain ranges:' Le Murge is a plateau that influences the Crispianese climate, making it milder. In winter they protect Crispiano from the rains coming from the north and from the cooler or cold northern winds and in summer they help to make the temperatures cooler due to the altitude and the surrounding woods.

'Distance of the seas:' A more distant place is from the sea, the more humid it is. Crispiano is 15 km away from the Ionian Sea, so it is more humid and more rainy than in Taranto. Moreover, the sea returns more heat to Taranto and less to Crispiano, therefore the temperature excursions are greater than in Taranto.

== Origins of the name ==
Some people attribute the name to the saints Crispo and Crispiniano. Others to a Roman matron Crispinilla or to such Crispius . A recent study derives the name from 'callis plana'.

== Culture ==
=== Instruction ===
==== Schools ====
In the municipal area there are two primary schools: the "Pasquale Mancini" school and the "Giovanni XXIII" school, and a secondary school "Francesco Severi" .

There is also a higher school: "E. Morante".

=== Events ===
The "Carnevale del Brigantino", takes place every year in the first days of July.

The "Summer Festival", Show, Fashion, Music and Art at the fair takes place from 2008 every last Sunday of August.

The patronal feast of the Madonna della Neve takes place every year in the first days of August.

The traditional feast in honor of San Michele Arcangelo, which takes place on the third Sunday of May in the gravine of Triglie, a rural area that marks the border between the municipalities of Crispiano and Statte.

The Peperoncino festival takes place the first weekend of September in S. Simone

== Economy ==
The prevailing element of Crispiano's economy is farming, with a flourishing agriculture based on olives. There are farms and small artisan companies which produce olive oil.

=== Twinning ===
Crispiano is twinned with: (Greece) Nea Chalkidona

== Sport ==
In the municipality there is a football club "USD Crispiano", affiliated with Vicenza Calcio.
