= Monteiasi =

- Comune
- Comune di Monteiasi
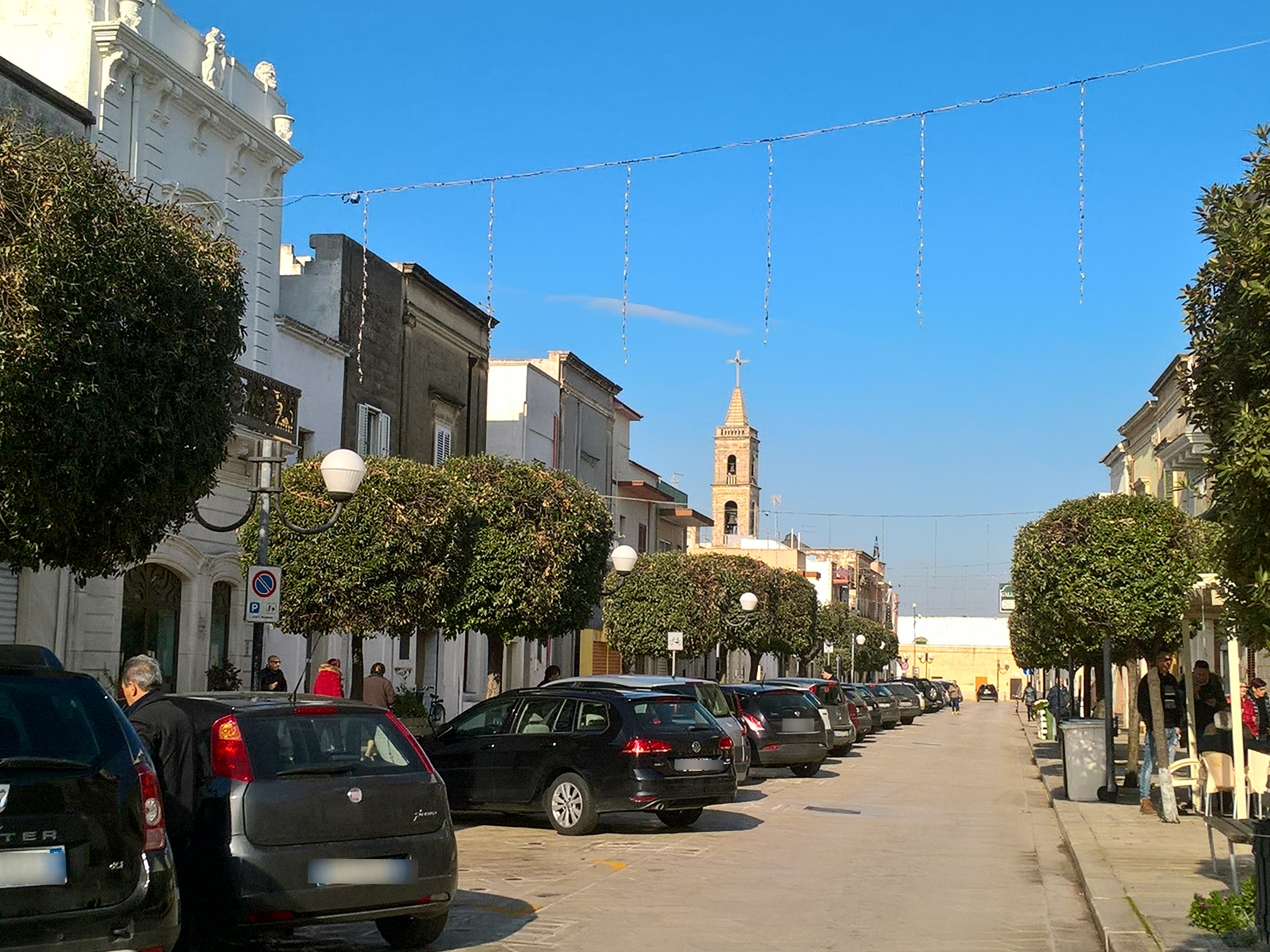
- View of Monteiasi

- Location within Italy Location within Apulia
- Coordinates: 40°30′N 17°23′E
- Country: Italy
- Region: Apulia
- Province: Taranto (TA)

Government
  - Mayor: Cosimo Ciura

Area
  - Total: 9.81 km^{2} (3.79 sq mi)

Population (28 February 2017)
  - Total: 5,605
  - Density: 571/km^{2} (1,480/sq mi)
- Demonym: Monteiasini
- Time zone: UTC+1 (CET)
  - Summer (DST): UTC+2 (CEST)
- Postal code: 74020
- Dialing code: 099
- Website: Official website

Monteiasi (Tarantino: Mundejase; Brindisino: Muntiasi; locally Muntiase) is a town and comune in the province of Taranto, in the Apulia region of southern Italy.

Historically, Monteiasi was an Arbëreshë settlement. After the inhabitants abandoned the Albanian Greek Orthodox faith, they assimilated into the local population.

== Physical geography ==
Monteiasi is located in the Mediterranean landscape, characterized by olive trees and vineyards.

== History ==
Around the 16th century, a large group of Albanian refugees coming from the Balkans during the conquest of the latter by the Ottoman Empire settled in Monteiasi. At the end of same century, it was forced to leave their houses, because the archbishops of Taranto abandoned the Greek rite.

== Toponymy ==
There are different interpretations regarding the origin of the name, however, they do not have any documentary evidence, contrary to what local people supposed. According to the most widespread opinion, the name "Monteiasi" derives from the ancient Greek compound 'monos tiasos' (literally 'sacred area'). Indeed various fragments of statuettes used for the worship of Dionysus were found in the countryside. Other interpretations claim that "Tiasì" means a series of dances performed by local farmers in honor of the god Bacchus, over time these dances were associated with the traditional taranta dance. From the standpoint of historians, the toponym derives from the devotion to Saint Blaise, 'mons Blasi' (Monte di Biagio). Further sources believe that the name is attributable to its geographical position: "inter montes" (among the mountains). Since it is located between the small hills whence Montemesola, Monteparano, and Grottaglie rise. Moreover, its origins may be traced back to the "Palummara" farm, located to the west of the town, which shows its story through the archaeological complex from the Neolithic to the Roman conquest.

== Dialect ==
Monteiasi dialect is similar to Salentino dialect, but it is also similar to Tarantino dialect.
