= Palagiano =

- Comune
- Comune di Palagiano
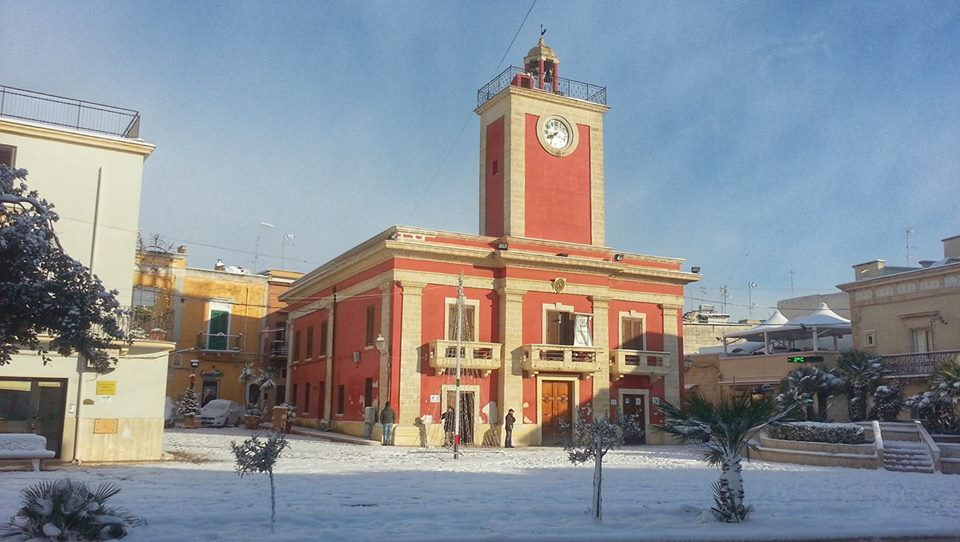
- View of Palagiano

- Location within Italy Location within Apulia
- Coordinates: 40°35′N 17°3′E
- Country: Italy
- Region: Apulia
- Province: Taranto (TA)
- Frazioni: Chiatona

Government
  - Mayor: Domenico Pio Lasigna

Area
  - Total: 69.97 km^{2} (27.02 sq mi)
- Elevation: 63 m (207 ft)

Population (31 March 2018)
  - Total: 16,091
  - Density: 230.0/km^{2} (595.6/sq mi)
- Demonym: Palagianesi
- Time zone: UTC+1 (CET)
  - Summer (DST): UTC+2 (CEST)
- Postal code: 74019
- Dialing code: 099
- Patron saint: St. Roch
- Saint day: 16–20 August
- Website: Official website

Palagiano is a town and comune in the province of Taranto, Apulia, southeast Italy.

It is known as the "City of the Clementines" due to its production of the PGI product "Clementine del Golfo di Taranto".

There is also a popular saying tied to this town, that being "ie semb fest a Polaschen", meaning "Palagiano is always in holiday" in apulian.
