= Torricella, Apulia =

Torricella
- Comune
- Comune di Torricella
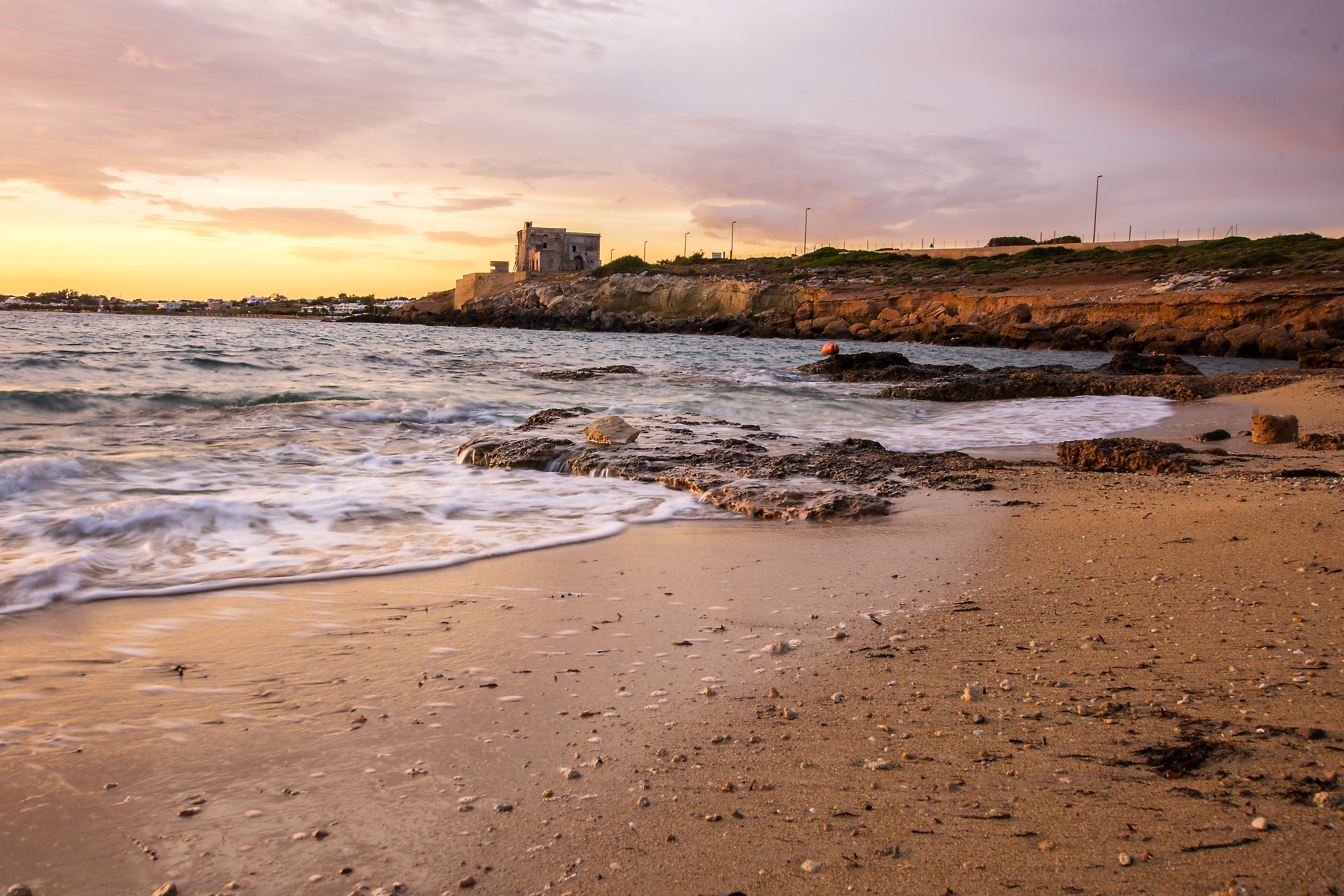
- View of Torricella

- Coat of arms

- Location within Italy Location within Apulia
- Coordinates: 40°21′N 17°30′E
- Country: Italy
- Region: Apulia
- Province: Taranto (TA)
- Frazioni: Monacizzo, Torre Ovo-Librari-Truglione

Government
  - Mayor: Michele Schifone

Area
  - Total: 26.93 km^{2} (10.40 sq mi)
- Elevation: 32 m (105 ft)

Population (31 December 2015)
  - Total: 4,500
  - Density: 170/km^{2} (430/sq mi)
- Demonym: Torricellesi
- Time zone: UTC+1 (CET)
  - Summer (DST): UTC+2 (CEST)
- Postal code: 74020
- Dialing code: 099
- Website: Official website

Torricella (Brindisino: Turricèdda) is a town and comune in the province of Taranto, in the Apulia region of southeast Italy. It is home to a large tuff castle from the 15th century, one of the best preserved in the region.

It is mostly an agricultural center, with production of olives and olive oil, wine, wheat, figs and sheep husbandry.

== History ==
The settlement's origins date to the 11th century, when a group of shepherds and peasants abandoned the coast (where is now the archaeological site of Torre Ovo) to seek protection against the Saracen raids. To crypt of the Santissima Trinità church (12th century) is from that period.

In 1407 it was held by the Capitignano family, which was followed by the Santoro, Montagnese and Muscettola. After the abolition of feudalism in the early 19th century, it was part of Sava and then Lizzano, becoming an autonomous comune in 1954.
