= Fragagnano =

- Comune
- Comune di Fragagnano
- Coat of arms

- Location in Taranto Province

- Location within Italy Location within Apulia
- Coordinates: 40°26′N 17°28′E
- Country: Italy
- Region: Apulia
- Province: Taranto (TA)

Government
  - Mayor: Giuseppe Fischetti

Area
  - Total: 22.41 km^{2} (8.65 sq mi)
- Elevation: 126 m (413 ft)

Population (31 January 2018)
  - Total: 5,781
  - Density: 258.0/km^{2} (668.1/sq mi)
- Demonym: Fragagnanesi
- Time zone: UTC+1 (CET)
  - Summer (DST): UTC+2 (CEST)
- Postal code: 74022
- Dialing code: 099
- ISTAT code: 073006
- Patron saint: Saint Anthony of Padua - Saint Joseph
- Saint day: 12–13 August / 13–14 March
- Website: Official website

Fragagnano (Salentino: Fragnànu) is a town and comune in the province of Taranto, Apulia, southeast Italy. The town was historically an Arbëreshë community, but has since assimilated.
