= Tarantino dialect =

Dialect of Neapolitan spoken in Apulia

Tarantino
- tarandíne
- Native to: Italy
- Region: Apulia
- Language family: Indo-European: Italic; Latino-Faliscan; Latin; Romance; Italo-Western; Italo-Dalmatian; Italo-Romance; Neapolitan; Apulian; Tarantino

Language codes
- ISO 639-3: –
- Glottolog: None
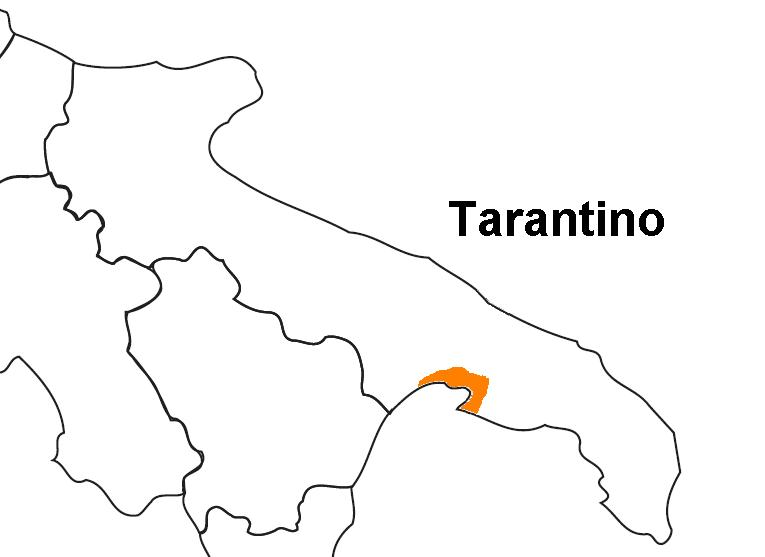
- Tarantino is spoken in the city of Taranto in southeastern Italy

Tarantino (/ˌtærənˈtiːnoʊ/; Tarantino: dialètte tarandíne [taranˈdiːnə] or u tarandíne; Italian: dialetto tarantino, pronounced [taranˈtiːno]), also known as the Cataldian vernacular (so called, from the twentieth century onward, in honor of the city's patron saint), is a transitional language or dialect, most of whose speakers live in the southeastern Italian region of Apulia, especially in the Apulian city of Taranto (with specific varieties in some neighboring municipalities). The dialect is also spoken by a few Italian immigrants in the United States, especially in California.

In Taranto, differences are found between the Old Town variant of Tarantino and that of the Borgo Nuovo. Today it is also spoken in the nearby municipalities of Statte and Leporano by the majority of the population, while in Monteiasi it displays more distinctly Salentine features.

From a linguistic point of view, Tarantino occupies a transitional position between the Salentino dialects (belonging to the group of Extreme Southern Italian dialects) and the Apulo-Barese dialects (belonging to the Intermediate Southern Italian group).

The distinctiveness of Tarantino has often been attributed to its Greek substratum, dating back to antiquity and maintained until the sixteenth century, when Greek was still spoken alongside Romance vernaculars in the area. This feature links Tarantino to the Extreme Southern Italian dialects (Salentino, Southern Calabrian, and Sicilian), with which it shares numerous lexical and structural elements of Greek origin.

Recent studies have highlighted that these characteristics are not merely borrowings, but genuine structural elements deriving from the ancient Magna Graecia koine.

== History ==
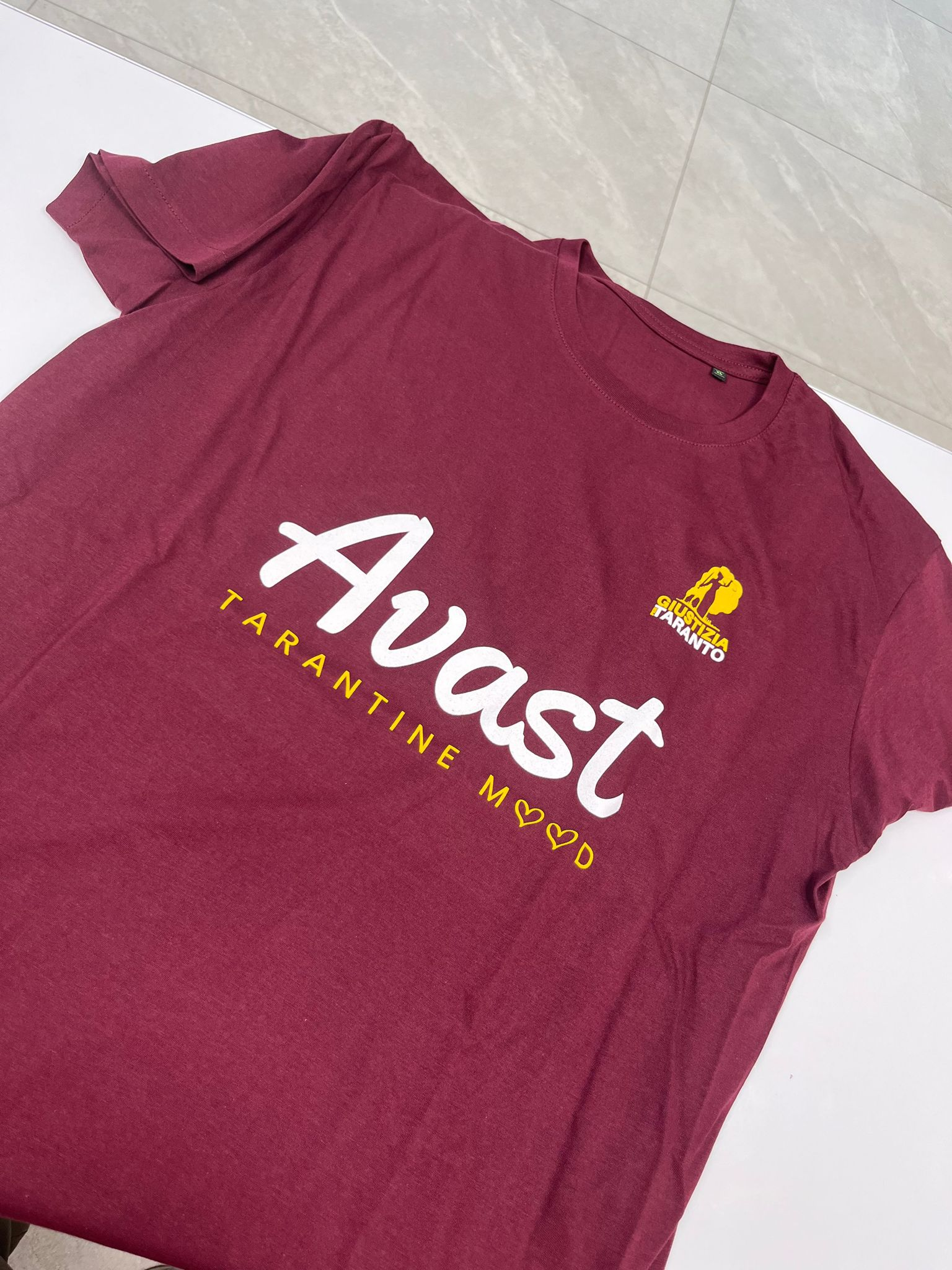
Communication using dialect in Taranto.

The Tarantino dialect traces its origins into ancient times, when the territory was dominated by the Messapii.

The colonisation by the Greeks founded Taranto not only as the capital of Magna Graecia, but also as a centre of poetry and theatre. Greek maintained extraordinary vitality and left considerable influence on Tarantino, both in vocabulary (with hundreds of Greek terms still attested today across all semantic fields) and morpho-syntax (grammar), as attested, for example, by De Vincentiis (1872) and by more recent studies by Ledgeway (2020), with features such as the loss of the infinitive and the particular system of hypothetical marking that bring Tarantino closer to the other Extreme Southern Italian dialects, and a very peculiar accent that scholars linked to Doric. Some examples are:

- Over 700 Greek terms in core lexical domains (e.g. "apele" < άπαλος for "soft", "'nanghe" < ανάγκη for "desire")
- Peculiar syntactic structures such as the loss of the infinitive (e.g. "vogghie cu mange" instead of "voglio mangiare")
- Phonetic traits such as vowel reduction (η > i, ω > u)

These influences are still found in many Tarantino words of Greek origin. (Note: Tarantino words with Greek origins: celóne "tortoise" < χελώνη chelṓnē (It. tartaruga); cèndre "nail" < κέντρον kéntron (It. chiodo); ceráse "cherry" < κεράσιον kerásion (It. ciliegia); mesále "tablecloth" < μεσάλον mesálon (It. tovaglia); àpule "soft" < ἀπαλός apalós (It. molle); tràscene "weeverfish" < δράκαινα drákaina (It. tracine).)

Subsequently, the city of Taranto became a Roman city, thus introducing much Vulgar Latin vocabulary. (Note: Some Tarantino vocabulary with Latin origins: díleche "skinny" < dēlicus (It. mingherlino); descetáre "to wake up" < oscitāre (It. svegliare); gramáre "to bemoan" < clāmāre (It. lamentarsi); 'mbise "bad, cruel" < impensa (It. cattivo, malvagio); sdevacáre "to empty, deprive" < devacāre (It. svuotare); aláre "to yawn" < hālāre (It. sbadigliare).)

The process of Latinization in the Taranto area displayed particular characteristics. The Vulgar Latin that developed here preserved numerous archaisms. At the same time, as highlighted for example by Rohlfs and by Gigante (2002), certain phonetic features, such as the particular treatment of vowels, reveal the influence of the Oscan substratum. Some examples are:

- Preservation of archaisms such as the construction "scere + gerund" (e.g. "sce mangienne" for "he is eating") from Latin "ire iendo"
- Oscan features in vowel articulation, responsible for later diphthongizations (o > ue)

During the Byzantine and Lombard periods, Tarantino acquired diphthongization: the short o changed to ue and the short e changed to ie; moreover, its vocabulary was further enriched with new words. (Note: Tarantino words of Lombardic origin: schife "skiff" < skif (It. piccola barca); ualáne "yokel" < gualane (It. bifolco).)

Contrary to what is often maintained in traditional literature, Lombard influences were marginal and limited to a few lexical loans common to the entire Romance area. The characteristic Tarantino diphthongizations, often erroneously attributed to Germanic influence, instead find their explanation in the Oscan substratum, as demonstrated by the recent studies of Loporcaro (2009). Some examples are:

- Lombard influence was limited to a few terms (e.g. "guerra", "faida")
- Diphthongizations (e.g. "muerte" for "morto") derive from the Oscan substratum
- Byzantine Greek further enriched the lexicon (e.g. "zimmere" < τσίμμαρο for "goat")

With the arrival of the Normans in 1071, a slow process of realignment of the Tarantino dialect with the other Southern Italian vernaculars began, and with the Angevins all the way through to 1400, the dialect lost much of its Eastern influences and was influenced by the French and Gallo-Italic elements. (Note: Tarantino vocabulary of French origin: fesciùdde "fichu" < fichu (It. coprispalle); accattáre "to buy" < acheter (It. comprare); pote "pocket" < poche (It. tasca); 'ndráme "guts" < entrailles (It. interiora).) In 1502, the city went under Catalan-Aragonese rule.

In 1801 the city was once again under the dominion of French troops, who left their mark with their Franco-Provençal language.

The 20th century represented a period of profound transformations for the Tarantino dialect. Industrialization and massive internal migratory flows accelerated a process of regional standardization, with a progressive attenuation of the most distinctly Salentino features that had characterized the dialect up to the first decades of the 20th century.

Taranto has long been linked to the Kingdom of Naples, which would explain some words in common with the Neapolitan dialect.

== Classification ==
The complex classification of the Tarantino dialect

Over the last two centuries, the debate over the classification of the Tarantino dialect has divided southern Italian dialectology. The fundamental question is whether it should be considered:

1. An Upper Southern Italian dialect (the "intermediate southern" group) with Salentino influences
2. An Extreme Southern Italian dialect (the "extreme southern" group) with local peculiarities
3. An autonomous variety within one of these two groups, given its uniqueness

Upper-southern hypotheses

Michele De Noto, in the pioneering "Appunti di fonetica del dialetto di Taranto", was the first to note phonetic divergences from Salento. Rosa Anna Greco ("Ricerca sul verbo nel dialetto tarentino") and G.B. Mancarella ("Nuovi contributi per la storia della lingua a Taranto") highlighted features shared with the central-southern area, for example:

- Metaphony and conditioned diphthongization (e.g. 'nzore, proche)
- Voicing of postnasals (-NT- > -nd-)
- Verbal system with double endings (-amme, -emme)

Extreme-southern hypotheses

Heinrich Lausberg, Gerhard Rohlfs instead argued for membership in the Sicilian-Salentino group, noting, for example:

- Open vowel outcomes (cuedde, strette)
- Use of the conjunction "cu" + indicative in place of the infinitive
- Nearly 1000 Greek loanwords shared with Salento

The decisive evidence: deep extreme-southern elements

Recent studies show that Tarantino shares with Extreme Southern Italian dialects structural traits which, according to Thomason & Kaufman, and other authors already mentioned, belong to levels 4-5 of the borrowability scale (loans possible only in cases of prolonged bilingualism or substrate):

1. Salentino syntax:
- Loss of the infinitive ("vogghie cu vvoche" = I want to go)
- Double conditional marking ("ce aveve, te dave" = if I had, I would give you)
- Greco-Salentino periphrastic constructions
1. Grecanic prosody:
- Final stress (as in Griko)
- Vowel reduction (eta>i, omega>u)
- Syllable-timed "effort" rhythm and "Magna Graecia prosody"
1. Deep lexicon:
- Over 700 Greek loanwords in "resistant" domains (body, kinship, nature)
- Lexical calques (e.g. "tremindere" < θωρω for "to look")

As shown by Ledgeway and Fanciullo, these elements - especially syntax and prosody - represent the fingerprint of Greek-Latin bilingualism, marginal instead in the Apulian-Barese dialect. The presence of:

- Level 5 structural borrowings (morphosyntax)
- Greek loanwords in protected lexical domains
- Grecanic phonological traits

would make it impossible to classify Tarantino as a simple Upper Southern variant, a dialect diasystem in which these elements are virtually absent. Rather, as Katsoyannou suggests, it should be considered a linguistic bridge between the two groups, with an Extreme Southern base enriched by subsequent inputs.

== Phonology ==
=== Vowels ===
In addition to the typical five Italian vowels a e i o u, the Tarantino dialect also has another five: e and o are close vowels, a has a particularly close, almost semi-mute sound, and i and u are called "hard vowels", since they are pronounced with a notable vibration of the vocal cords; vowels with an acute accent are all long and have double value compared to Italian ones. There are also the open vowels e and o (always short) and those with a circumflex accent a e i o u often used (especially in the case of o) to indicate the contraction of a vowel with a consonant or another vowel:

- core (cuore), from Latin cor, cordis, from which it does not inherit the u of Italian cuore;
- bbone (buona), from the Latin root bonu-, from which it does not inherit the u of Italian buona;
- sce o cineme (to go to the cinema), contraction of a'u (a lu);
- scenne' d'a machene (to get out of the car), contraction of da la.

There is also another vowel, the mute e (phonetically equivalent to the schwa e), which is always mute at the end of a word and almost always semi-mute in pretonic position: a word like perebisse, therefore, should be pronounced as [pərəbisse]. In the case where a word ending in mute e forms a syntactic cluster with the following word, the vowel becomes voiced: marange -> marangia ponde (pointed, spoiled orange).

=== Consonants ===
The consonants are the same as in Italian, with only five additions: c when in postonic position tends to be pronounced like sc in sciocco (e.g. doce [do:se], face [fa:se], etc.), suffixal -j pronounced like the y in the English word yellow, the cluster sck where sc is pronounced as in the Italian word scena, k as the c in casa, the cluster ije pronounced more or less like ille in the French word bouteille, and v in intervocalic position which has no sound (e.g. avuandare, tuve, etc.). Double consonants are very frequent at the beginning of a word and in pretonic position.

=== Diaeresis ===
Because of the large number of homophones present in the Tarantino dialect, sometimes it is necessary to distinguish them by means of an accent or a diaeresis; the latter is used especially to indicate hiatus between two consonants, for example:

- fiure (flowers), fiure (figure);
- pesce (fish), pesce (worse), etc.

== Grammar ==
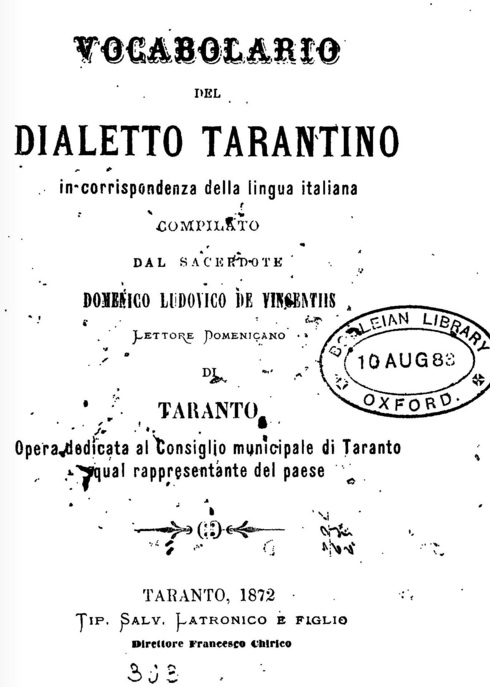
The Vocabolario del dialetto tarantino by Domenico Ludovico de Vincentiis, a masterly work of 1872, is today one of the main reference points for the study of the evolution of the Tarantino vernacular over the last century.

=== Morphology ===
==== Pronouns ====
The demonstrative pronouns are:

- quiste (this);
- questa (this);
- chiste (these, these);
- quidde (that);
- quedde (that);
- chidde (those).

More commonly used in speech are the abbreviated forms: 'stu for quiste, 'sta for questa, 'ste for chiste.

The personal pronouns are:

person	subject	clitic	stressed	reflexive
1st singular	ie	me	meie	me
2nd singular	tune	te	teie/teve	te
3rd singular masculine	iidde	le	iidde	se
3rd singular feminine	iedde	le	jedde	se
1st plural	nuie/nu'	ne	nuie/nu'	ne
2nd plural	vuie/vu	ve	vuie/vu	ve
3rd plural (unspecified)	lore	le	lore	se
impersonal	se	--	--	se

The relative pronouns are:

- ci, ce (who);
- ca (which, who, whom, of which, to whom).

For example:

- ci si tu? (who are you?);
- 'a cristiane c'agghie viste aiere (the lady whom I saw yesterday);
- le libbre ca m'he parlate (the books you told me about).

==== Adjectives ====
The possessive adjectives are:

person	masculine singular	feminine singular	plural (unspecified)	enclitic form
1st singular	mie	meie	mije	-me
2nd singular	tuie, tuve	toie, tove	tuje, tuve	-te
3rd singular	suve	sove	suve	-se
1st plural	nuestre	nostre	nuestre	-
2nd plural	vuestre	vostre	vuestre	-
3rd plural	lore	lore	lore	-se

In the Tarantino dialect, the possessive adjective must always be placed after the noun it refers to:

- 'a machena meie (my car).

ca and cu

ca (Lat. quia) can have the value of:

- relative preposition: voche a 'ccatte 'u prime ca jacchie (I go to buy the first one I find);
- conjunction:
  1. in the declarative clause: sacce ca je 'nu bbuene uagnone (I know that he is a good boy);
  2. in the consecutive clause: ave ca no 'nge 'u veche (it has been a long time since I have seen him);
- introducing the comparative: jeve cchiu 'a fodde ca 'u reste (the crowd was more than the rest).

Cu (Lat. quod) can have the value of:

- preposition: tagghiare c'u curtidde (to cut with the knife);
- conjunction (with);
- after verbs expressing a desire or an order: vole cu mmange (he wants to eat);
- to form the present subjunctive: cu avene aqqua (let him come here);
- in the adversative form: cu tutte ca (even though);
- in final clauses: vuleve cu eve cchiu dritte (I would have liked to be more capable);
- in concessive clauses: avaste cu ppaje (as long as you pay);
- as a periphrastic present: ste cu avene (he is about to come).

The partitive does not exist in Tarantino, and to translate it two forms are used:

- 'nu picche (a little);
- doje (two).

For example:

- pozze ave' nu picche de marange? (could I have some oranges?);
- ajere hagghie accattate ddo' muleddere (yesterday I bought two apples).

=== Accusative and vocative ===
Of the old grammatical cases, the Tarantino dialect has preserved in its modern form only the accusative and the vocative. As in other languages of the Mediterranean area, the accusative in Tarantino is marked by the insertion of the preposition a only if it refers to people:

- Addummannele a ffratte (ask your brother)
- He chiamate o dottore? (have you called the doctor?)
- Puertete a Marie (take Maria with you)

=== Verbs ===
A typical feature is the frequent use of prothesis of the vowel -a-, which results in a double verbal form:

- cogghiere and accogghiere (to gather);
- 'ndruppecare and attruppecare (to stumble).

There is also the presence of the inchoative suffix -esce derived from the old -ire:

- durmescere (to sleep);
- sparescere (to disappear);
- scurescere (to get dark).

Vowel alternation is very widespread among first-conjugation verbs, due to metaphony. They are subject to diphthongization of the last thematic vowel (-o- to -ue-). For example:

- sciucare (to play): ije scioche, tu sciuche, jidde scioche, nu' sciucame, vu' sciucate, lore sciochene;
- annegghiare (to disappear): ije annigghie, tu annigghie, jidde annigghie, nu' annegghiame, vu' annegghiate, lore annighiane.

Second-conjugation verbs yield o as u:

- cosere (to sew): ije cose, tu cuse, jidde cose, nu' cusime, vu' cusite, lore cosene;
- canoscere (to know): ije canosche, tu canusce, jidde canosce, nu' canuscime, vu' canuscite, lore canoscene.

==== Conjugations ====
Tarantino has two conjugations: one in -are, the richest, and one in -ere (derived from Latin -ire).

==== Infinitive ====
The infinitive is formed, especially in informal speech, by apocope of the standard dictionary forms:

- addummanna from addumannare (to ask);
- canosce' from canoscere (to know).

In Tarantino the infinitive is largely absent from verbal constructions, except in constructions with "can" and "must", being replaced by cu followed by the present indicative, as in Greek

- te vogghie cu ddiche (I want to tell you);
- dille cu avene (tell him to come).

==== Indicative mood ====
The endings used to form the present indicative are as follows:

- first conjugation: -e, -e, -e, -ame, -ate, -ene;
- second conjugation: -e, -e, -e, -ime, -ite, -ene.

Unlike other Apulian dialects, Tarantino does not show the ending -che for first persons. This ending is used, however, for monosyllabic verbs:

- voche (I go);
- veche (I see);
- stoche (I stay).

The present progressive in Tarantino is formed with the present indicative of stare + the preposition a + the present indicative of the verb:

- stoche a ffazze (I am doing).
- stonne a sciochene (they are playing)

Exceptions to this rule are the second and third person singular, which do not require use of the preposition a:

- ste studie (he is studying);
- ste mmange (he is eating).

In the imperfect we find the following endings:

- first conjugation: -ave, -ave, -ave, -amme, -aveve (-avve), -avene;
- second conjugation: -eve, -ive, -eve, -emme, -ivene (-ivve), -evene.

For the preterite the endings are:

- first conjugation: -eve, -aste, -oie, -amme, -aste, -arene;
- second conjugation: -ive, -iste, -ie, -emme, -iste, -erene.

In the Tarantino dialect there is no single-word form of the future, which is therefore often replaced by the present indicative, or expressed by means of the future periphrasis derived from Latin habeo ab/de + infinitive, a feature common to other languages, including the Sardinian language:

- agghie da ccunda or agghi'a ccunda (I will tell).

This construction is also used to express necessity:

- Ce amme a ffa'? (what must we do?).

==== Subjunctive mood ====
The present subjunctive has a particular form, typical of Salentino dialects; it is rendered with the conjunction cu followed by the present indicative:

- Dille cu avenene cu nnuje! (tell them to come with us!).

By contrast, the imperfect subjunctive has its own endings:

- first conjugation: -asse, -asse, -asse, -amme, -aste, -assere;
- second conjugation: -isse, -isse, -esse, -emme, -iste, -essere.

==== Conditional mood ====
Another non-existent verbal tense is the conditional, replaced by the imperfect indicative or the imperfect subjunctive:

- vuleve sce o cineme (I would like to go to the cinema);
- vulisse vene pure ie (I would like to come too).

==== Imperative mood ====
The imperative is generally the same as the corresponding person of the present indicative:

- tremiende! (look!),
- sciame! (let's go!),
- avenite! (come!).

The formation of the negative imperative is more complicated: it is obtained through the verbal periphrasis with scere + gerund (from Latin ire iendo):

- no sce scenne a scole osce (don't go to school today).

==== Participle mood ====
The past participle is formed by adding the suffix -ate for verbs belonging to the first group, and the suffix -ute for verbs belonging to the second. However, there are also past participles ending in -ste, of Latin derivation:

- candate from candare (sung),
- partute from partere (left),
- viste from vedere (seen),
- pueste from ponere (put),
- rumaste from rumanere (remained).

==== Essere ====
person	Present indicative	Imperfect	Preterite	Present subjunctive	Imperfect subjunctive
Ije	sonde/so'	ere	fueve	cu ssie	fosse
Tune/Tu	sinde/si'	ire	fuiste	cu ssije	fuesse
Jidde, Jedde	je, ete	ere, jeve	fu'	cu ssije	fosse
Nuje	sime	ereme	fuemme	cu sime	fosseme
Vuje	site	ireve	fuesteve	cu ssite	fuesseve
Lore	sonde/so'	erene, jevene	furene	cu ssiene	fossere

==== Avere ====
person	Present indicative	Imperfect	Preterite	Present subjunctive	Imperfect subjunctive
Ije	hagghie	aveve	avibbe	cu hagghie	avisse
Tune/Tu	he	avive	aviste	cu hagghie	avisse
Jidde, Jedde	ha/have	aveve	avi	cu hagghie	avesse
Nuje	ame	aveveme	avemme	cu avime	avisseme
Vuje	avite	aviveve	avisteve	cu avite	avisseve
Lore	honne/avene	avevene	averene	cu honne	avessere

== Samples ==
The Tarantino versions are compared to the Italian ones.

'U 'Mbierne de Dande (Claudio De Cuia)

'Mmienze ô camíne nuèstre de 'sta víte
ij' me scè 'cchiève jndr'a 'nu vòsch'uscúre
ca 'a drètta vije addáne havè' sparíte.

Ma ci l'à ddà cundáre le delúre
de 'stu vosche sarvagge e 'a strada stòrte
ca jndr'o penzière me crèsce 'a pavúre.

Ma è tand'amáre ch'è pêsce d'a morte;
ma pe' ccundáre 'u bbéne ca truvéve,
hagghia parlà' de quèdda mala sòrte.

Ije mo' nò ssacce accum'è ca m'acchiève,
tand'assunnáte stáve a qquèdda vanne
ca 'a vije veràce te scè' 'bbandunéve.

Doppe ch'havè' 'rreváte tremelànne
già 'ngocchie a lle fenéte de 'sta chiàne,
ch'angòre ô côre dè' mattáne e affanne,

vedíve 'u cièle tutte a mmane-a-mmane
ca s'ammandáve d'a luce d'u sole
ca 'nzignalèsce 'a strate a ogne crestiáne...

Inferno – Canto I (Dante Alighieri)

Nel mezzo del cammin di nostra vita
mi ritrovai per una selva oscura,
ché la diritta via era smarrita.

Ahi quanto a dir qual era è cosa dura
esta selva selvaggia e aspra e forte
che nel pensier rinova la paura!

Tant' è amara che poco è più morte;
ma per trattar del ben ch'i' vi trovai,
dirò de l'altre cose ch'i' v'ho scorte.

Io non so ben ridir com' i' v'intrai,
tant' era pien di sonno a quel punto
che la verace via abbandonai.

Ma poi ch'i' fui al piè d'un colle giunto,
là dove terminava quella valle
che m'avea di paura il cor compunto,

guardai in alto e vidi le sue spalle
vestite già de' raggi del pianeta
che mena dritto altrui per ogne calle...

'U 'càndeche de le crijatúre de San Frangísche (Enrico Vetrò)

Altísseme, 'Neputènde, Signóre bbuéne,
Túje so' le làude, 'a glorie e ll’anóre e ogne bbenedizzióne.

A Tté súle, Altísseme, Te tòcchene,
e nnisciún’óme éte dègne de Te menduváre.

Lavudáte sije, Signóre mije, appríss’a ttutte le crijatúre Tóve,
spéče frátema mije mèstre sóle,
ca jé llúče d’u ggiúrne, e nn’allumenìsce a nnúje cu jidde.

E jìdd’é' bbèlle e allucèsce cu sblennóre granne,
de Téje, Altísseme, annùče 'u valóre.

Lavudáte sije, Signóre mije, pe' ssòrem’a lúne e lle stèdde:
'ngíele l’hé crijáte lucénde, sobraffíne e vvalènde, e bbèdde.

Lavudáte sije, Signóre mije, pe' ffráteme 'u víende,
e ppe' ll’àrie, le nùvele, 'u chiaríme e ogne ttìjembe,
ca cu chìdde a lle crijatúre Tóve le fáče refiatà.

Lavudáte sije, Signóre mije, pe' ssòreme l’acque,
ca jé ùtele asséje, terragnóle, prizziósa e cchiáre.

Lavudáte sije, Signóre mije, pe' ffráteme 'u fuéche,
ca cu jìdde allumenìsce 'a nòtte:
e jidd’è' bbèlle, allègre, pastecchíne e ffòrte.

Lavudáte sije, Signóre mije, p’a sóra nòstra màtra tèrre,
ca ne mandéne e nn’ènghie 'a vèndre,
e ccàcce numúnne de frùtte e ppúre fiúre d’ogne cculóre e ll’èrve.

Lavudáte sije, Signóre mije, pe' cchidde ca perdònene p’amóre Túve
E ssuppòrtene malatíje e ttrìbbule.

Vijáte a cchìdde ca l’honna ssuppurtà cu rrassignazzióne,
ca da Téje, Altísseme, honn’essere 'ngurunáte.

Lavudáte sije, Signóre mije, p’a sóra nostra morta d’u cuèrpe
ca da jèdde nisciún’ome ca refiáte po' scambáre:
uàje a cchìdde c’honna murè jind’a' le puccáte murtále;
vijáte a cchìdde ca jedde à dda truvà jind’a' Vulundà' Ttója Sandísseme,
ca a llóre 'a secònna mòrte no 'nge l’à ddà ffa' mále.

Lavudáte e bbenedecíte 'u Signóre mij' e dečíteLe gràzzie
E sservíteLe cu grànna devuzzióne.

Canticle of the Sun (Francis of Assisi)

Altissimu, onnipotente bon Signore,
Tue so' le laude, la gloria e l'honore et onne benedictione.

Ad Te solo, Altissimo, se konfano,
et nullu homo ène dignu te mentovare.

Laudato sie, mi' Signore cum tucte le Tue creature,
spetialmente messor lo frate Sole,
lo qual è iorno, et allumeni noi per lui.

Et ellu è bellu e radiante cum grande splendore:
de Te, Altissimo, porta significatione.

Laudato si', mi Signore, per sora Luna e le stelle:
in celu l'ài formate clarite et pretiose et belle.

Laudato si', mi' Signore, per frate Vento
et per aere et nubilo et sereno et onne tempo,
per lo quale, a le Tue creature dài sustentamento.

Laudato si', mi' Signore, per sor Aqua,
la quale è multo utile et humile et pretiosa et casta.

Laudato si', mi Signore, per frate Focu,
per lo quale ennallumini la nocte:
ed ello è bello et iocundo et robustoso et forte.

Laudato si', mi' Signore, per sora nostra matre Terra,
la quale ne sustenta et governa,
et produce diversi fructi con coloriti flori et herba.

Laudato si', mi Signore, per quelli che perdonano per lo Tuo amore
et sostengono infirmitate et tribulatione.

Beati quelli ke 'l sosterranno in pace,
ka da Te, Altissimo, sirano incoronati.

Laudato si' mi Signore, per sora nostra Morte corporale,
da la quale nullu homo vivente po' skappare:
guai a quelli ke morrano ne le peccata mortali;
beati quelli ke trovarà ne le Tue sanctissime voluntati,
ka la morte secunda no 'l farrà male.

Laudate et benedicete mi Signore et rengratiate
e serviateli cum grande humilitate..

== See also ==
- Salentino dialect
- Neapolitan language
- History of Taranto
