= Arberia Parish =

Eastern Orthodox Christian parish

The Arberia Parish (Note: Italian: Parrocchia ortodossa arbëresh del Patriarcato di Mosca; Albanian: Famullia Ortodokse Arbëreshe e Patriarkanës së Moskës; Russian: Арберешский православный приход Московского Патриархата) is an Eastern Orthodox Christian parish subordinated to the Russian Orthodox Church (Patriarchate of Moscow). It serves the minority Orthodox Christian community of the Arberesh people of Italy, who are predominantly adherents of the Italo-Albanian Greek Catholic Church. Its head church (Italian: Chiesa di Santa Caterina Megalomartire, Acquaformosa) is in Acquaformosa near Cosenza and is headed by Father Giovanni Capparelli, who is a subordinate of the Patriarch of Moscow. The patron saints of the Arberesh Orthodox Church are Saint John of Kronstadt and Saint Catherine Megalomartyr.

== Sources ==
- "Parishes in Italy". christianisme-orthodoxe.com. Christianisme Orthodoxe.
