= Culture of Apulia =

Region in Italy

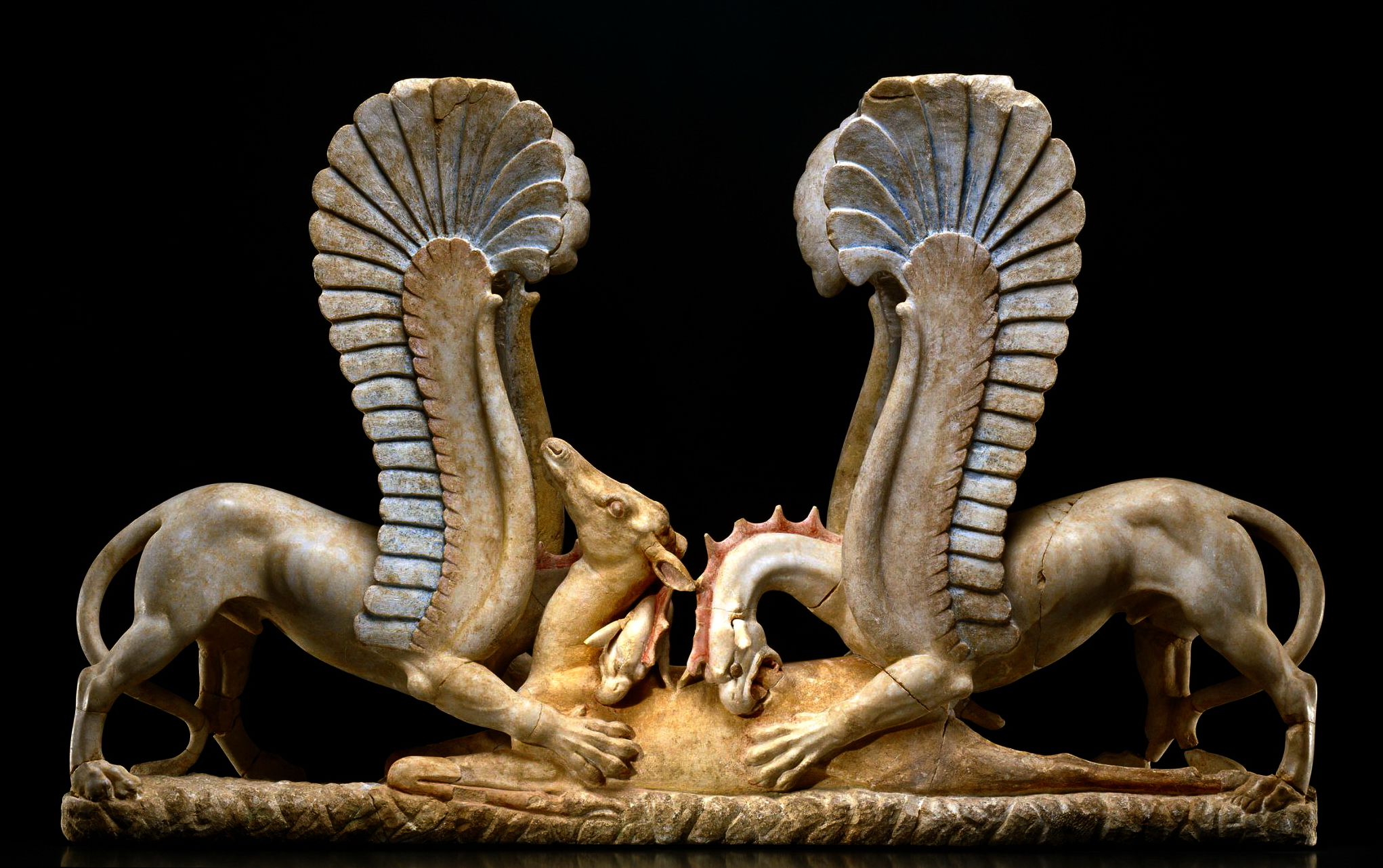
A trapezophore (table stand), part of the Ascoli Satriano marble set, found in a 4th-century B.C. Daunian tomb, preserved in the Civic Museum of Ascoli Satriano

The culture of Apulia (Italian: Puglia), the region that constitutes the extreme southeast of the Italian peninsula, has had, since ancient times, mixed influences from the West and the East, due to its strategic position near the transition zone between these two cultural regions. Its location, on the west coast of the Adriatic and Ionian seas, the natural southern border between Western Europe and the Balkans and Greece, made it a bridge to the East since antiquity, and in the Middle Ages, it was a cultural frontier between the Roman-Germanic West and the Greek-Byzantine East.

== Museums ==
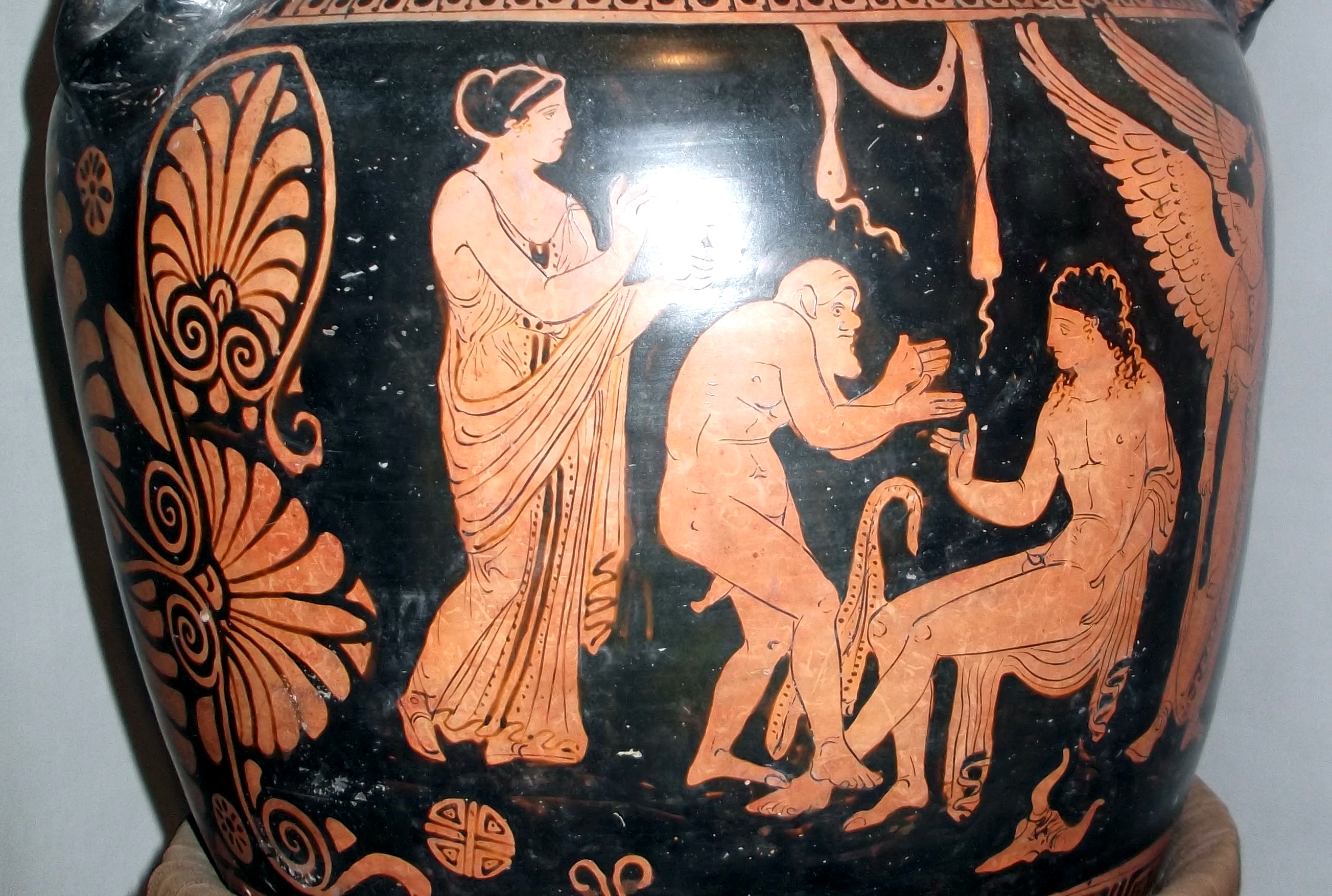
Apulian Krater at the Jatta National Archaeological Museum

=== Jatta National Archaeological Museum ===
Housed in the Jatta Palace in Ruvo di Puglia, it is the only example in Italy of a 19th-century private collection that has remained unchanged since the original museum design. The pieces preserved in the museum are from the collection gathered by the judge and archaeologist Giovanni Jatta (1767–1844) and his brother Giulio in the first half of the 19th century, being expanded by his nephew of the same name and acquired by the Italian state in 1991. A significant part of the collection consists of ceramics, mostly vases, from Magna Graecia, collected mainly in the Ruvo region, but also in those of Canosa and Taranto. Some pieces were collected in Greece.

=== National Archaeological Museum of Taranto (MArTA) ===
Considered one of Italy's most important archaeological museums, it was founded in 1887 on the initiative of the Salento archaeologist Luigi Volta, who gathered the first collection and whose goal was to create a museum of Magna Graecia. It has been housed in the former Convent of San Pasquale Baylon of the Alcantarine Friars (built in the second half of the 18th century) since its foundation, which has been modified several times since 1901. During the last restoration, which took place between 2000 and 2007, the museum operated in the Pantaleo Palace.

The museum exhibits mainly archaeological pieces that document the history of the Taranto region (part of Magna Graecia) and also of other regions of Apulia, from the Paleolithic, late antiquity and early Middle Ages, the first traces of settlement in the 5th millennium B.C. and the first contacts of the Iapygians with the Aegean world in the Bronze Age, the various stages of Spartan colonization on the coast of the Gulf of Taranto, and the Roman period. The museum illustrates the ways of life, religion, funeral rituals and economy of the Greek cities of ancient Apulia, as well as their relations with Hellenistic and native culture, doing the same for Roman cities. An important part of the collection is dedicated to the processing of precious metals, namely gold, one of the most developed activities in Magna Graecia between the 4th and 1st centuries B.C. One of the most remarkable sets in the museum is the so-called "Golds of Taranto", a collection of gold jewelry pieces.

Pieces from the National Archaeological Museum of Taranto
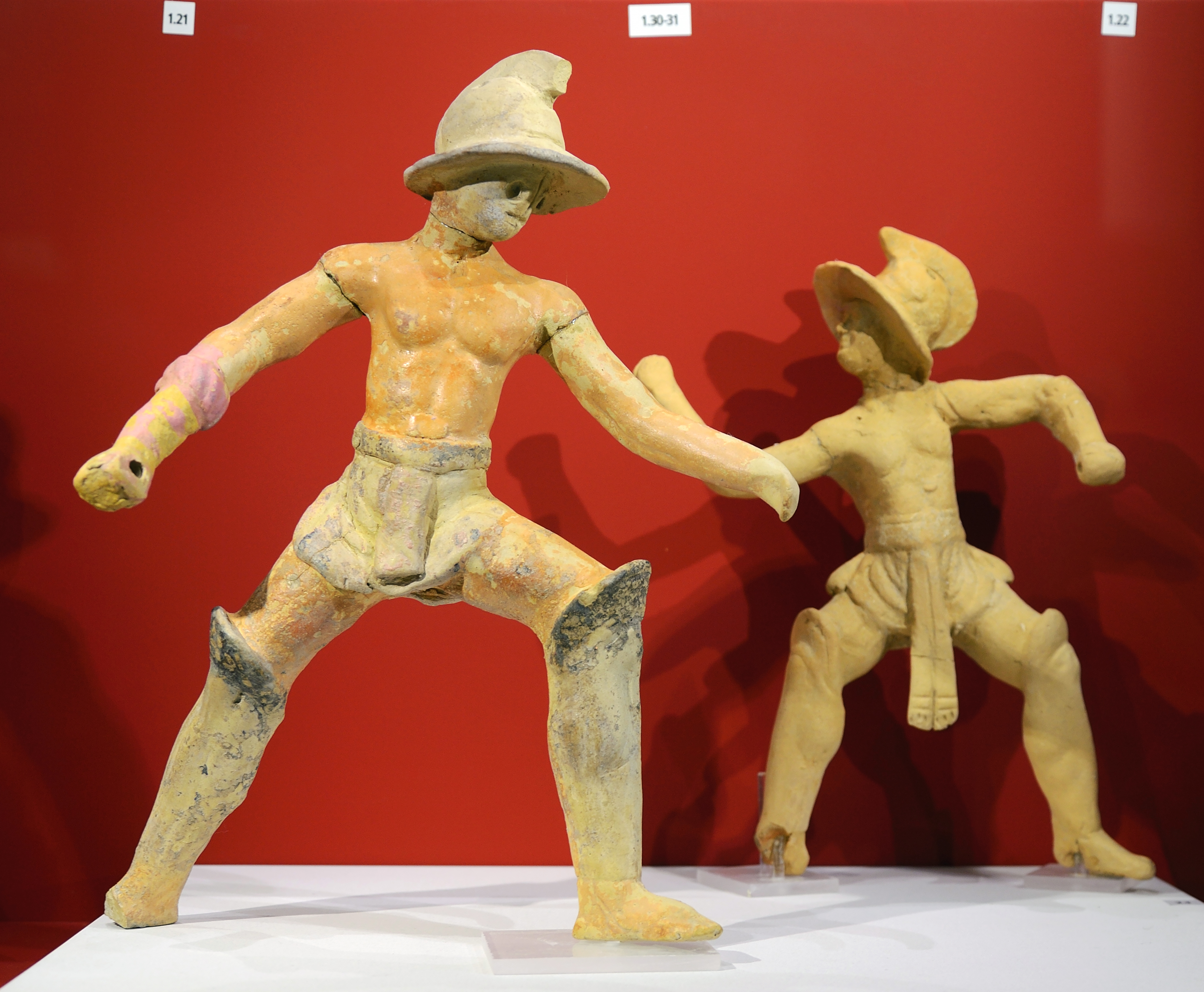
Ceramic statues of Roman gladiators

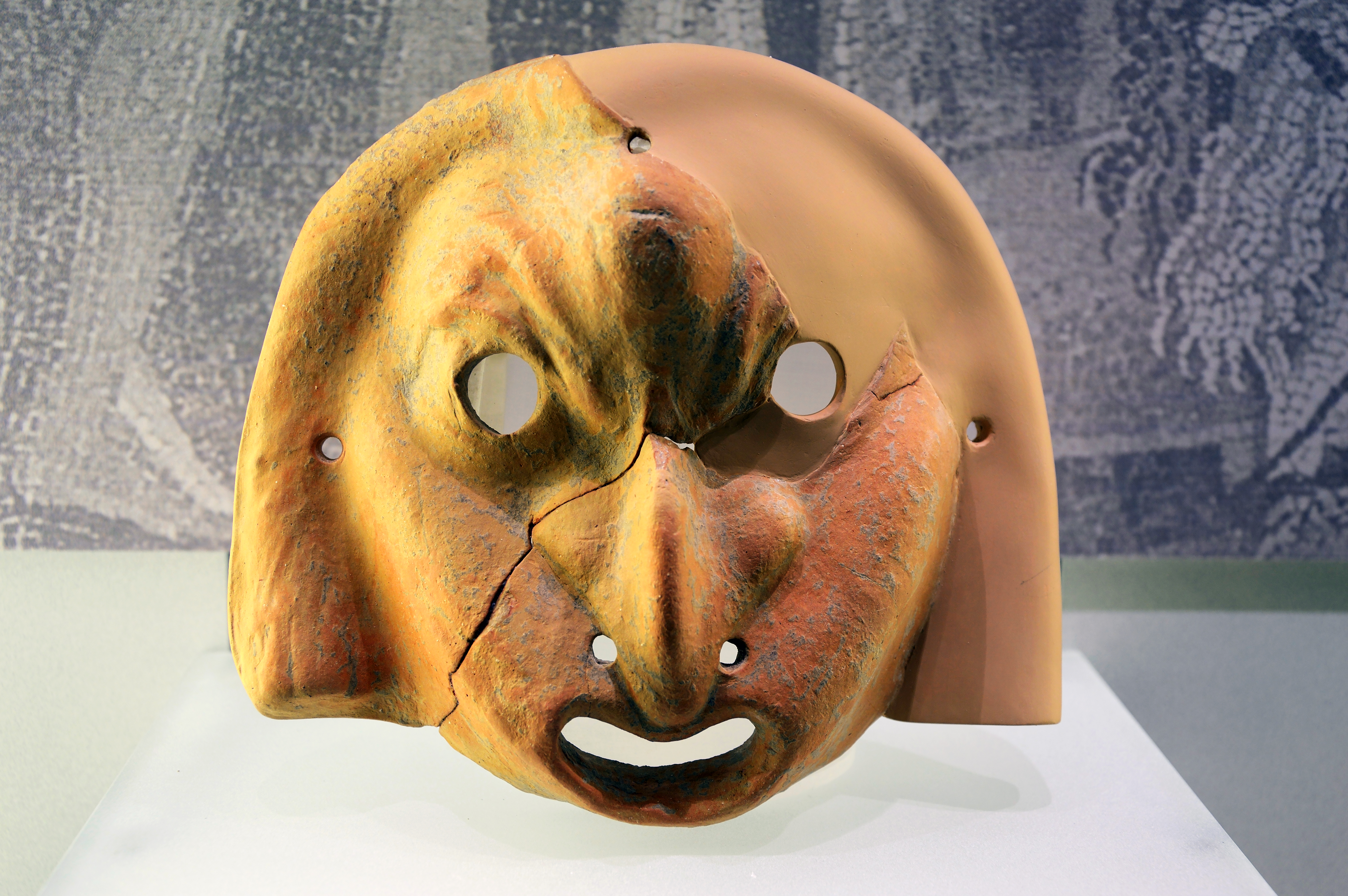
Greek terracotta mask

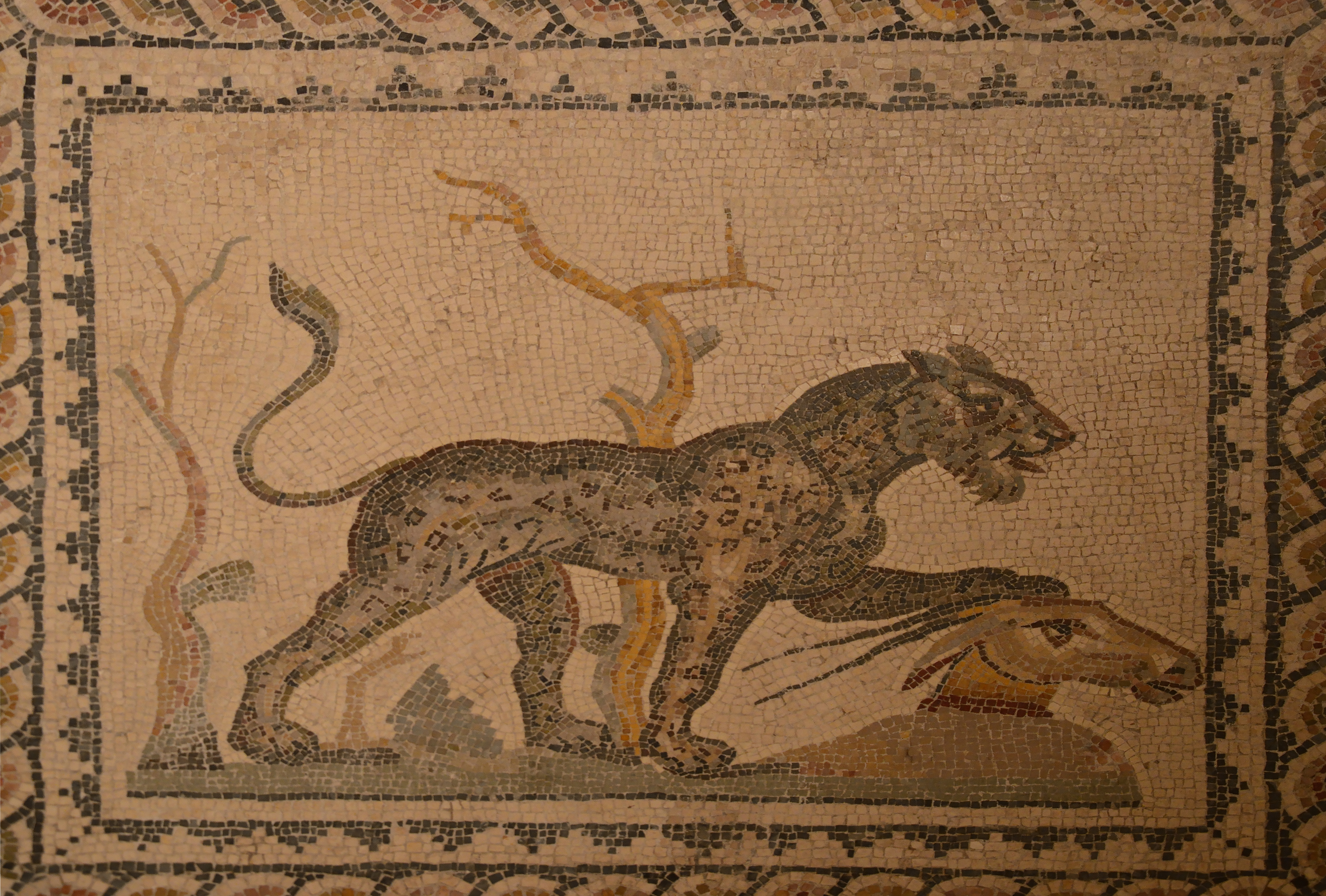
Mosaic with a panther and a goat head

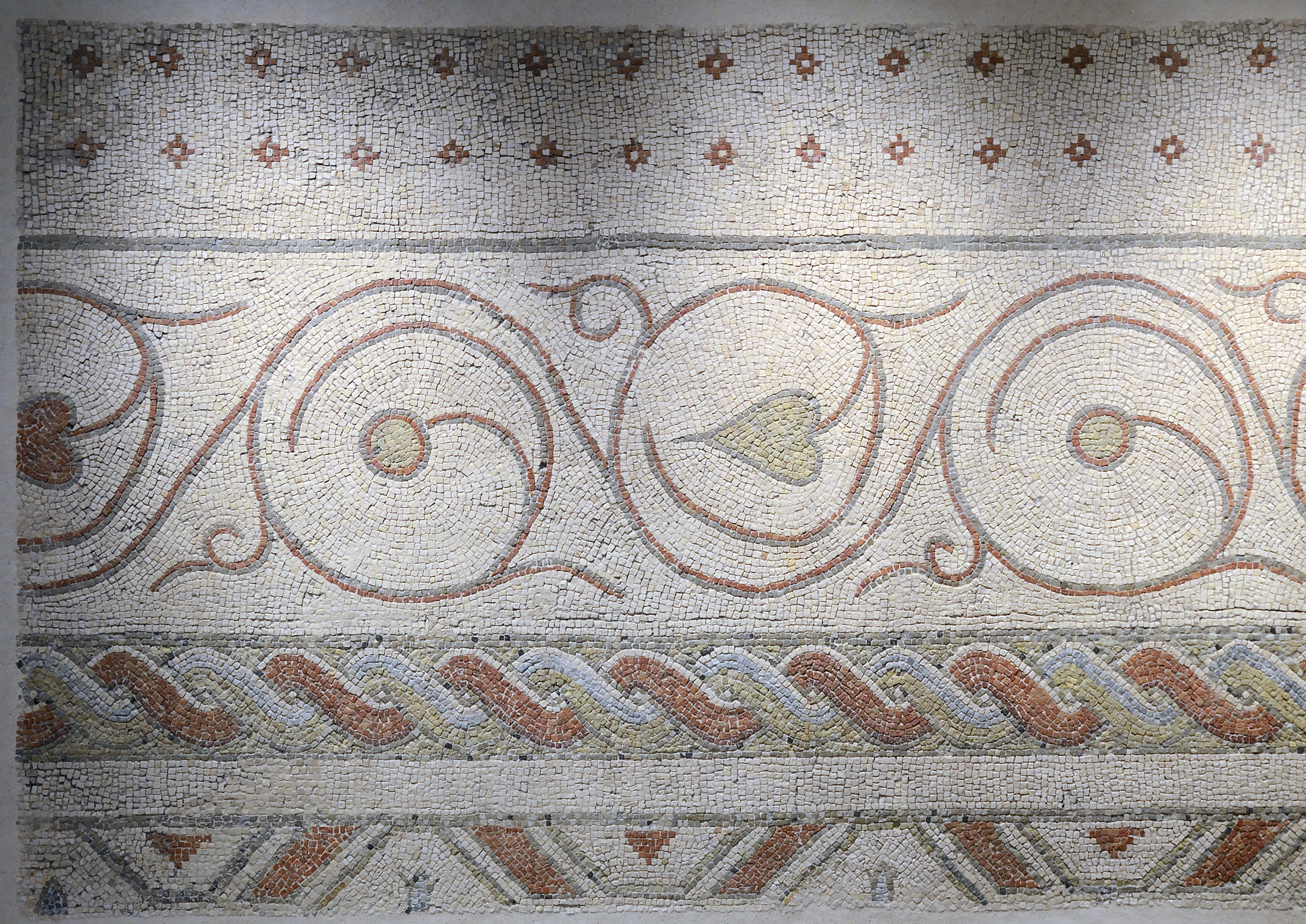
Mosaic with geometric motifs

=== Giuseppe Fiorelli Museum of Urban Archaeology ===
The Museo di Archeologia Urbana Giuseppe Fiorelli is housed in the De Nicastri-Cavalli Palace in Lucera, it was founded in 1905 and is considered the first "civic" (municipal) museum north of Bari. The archaeological collection includes precious artifacts ranging from prehistoric times to the Middle Ages and Roman times (most notably the mosaic in Piazza Nocelli). It also displays pieces of furniture from the De Nicastri family and a gallery of paintings by the Lucerino painter Giuseppe Ar (1898–1956).

=== Francesco Ribezzo Provincial Archaeological Museum (MAPRI) ===
The Museo Archeologico Provinciale Francesco Ribezzo was founded in 1884 and is named after the local archaeologist and glottologist of the same name (1875–1952). It is located in the Piazza Duomo of Brindisi. The prehistoric sections include finds from all over the province, namely inscriptions in Latin, Hebrew, and Greek, coins from the classical, medieval, and modern eras, Roman statues found in the historic center of Brindisi, Apulian, Attican and Messapian vases (trozzelle). There are also two bronze sculptures from Punta del Serrone, with restored statues of the Roman consul Lucius Aemilius Paullus Macedonicus and Roman citizens wearing togas, busts, female figures, and other bronze pieces found in the underwater excavations carried out in 1992.

=== Provincial Museum of Sigismondo Castromediano ===
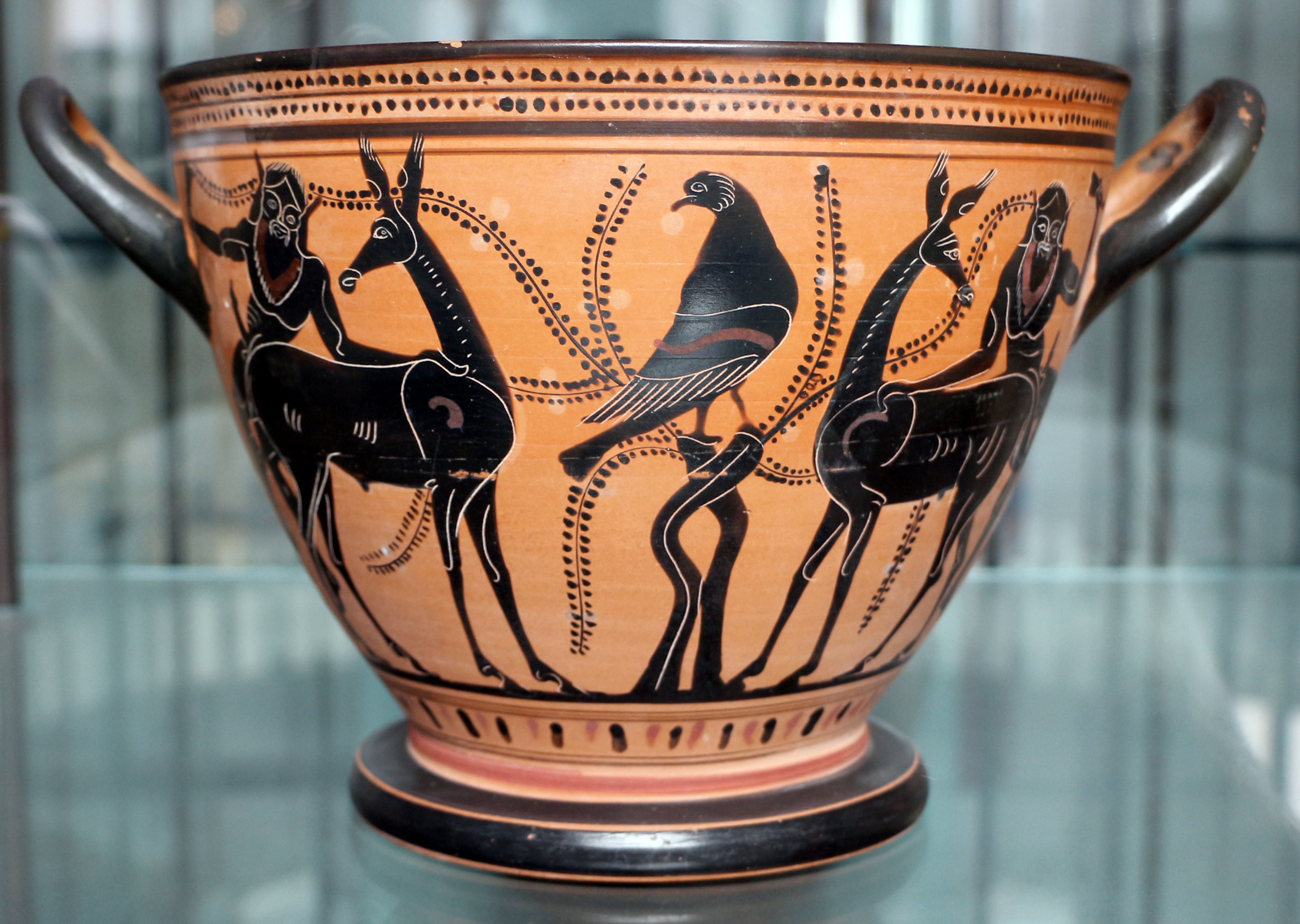
An Attican skyphos in the style of the painter Theseus (5th century B.C.) from Massafra, in the Provincial Museum of Sigismondo Castromediano in Lecce

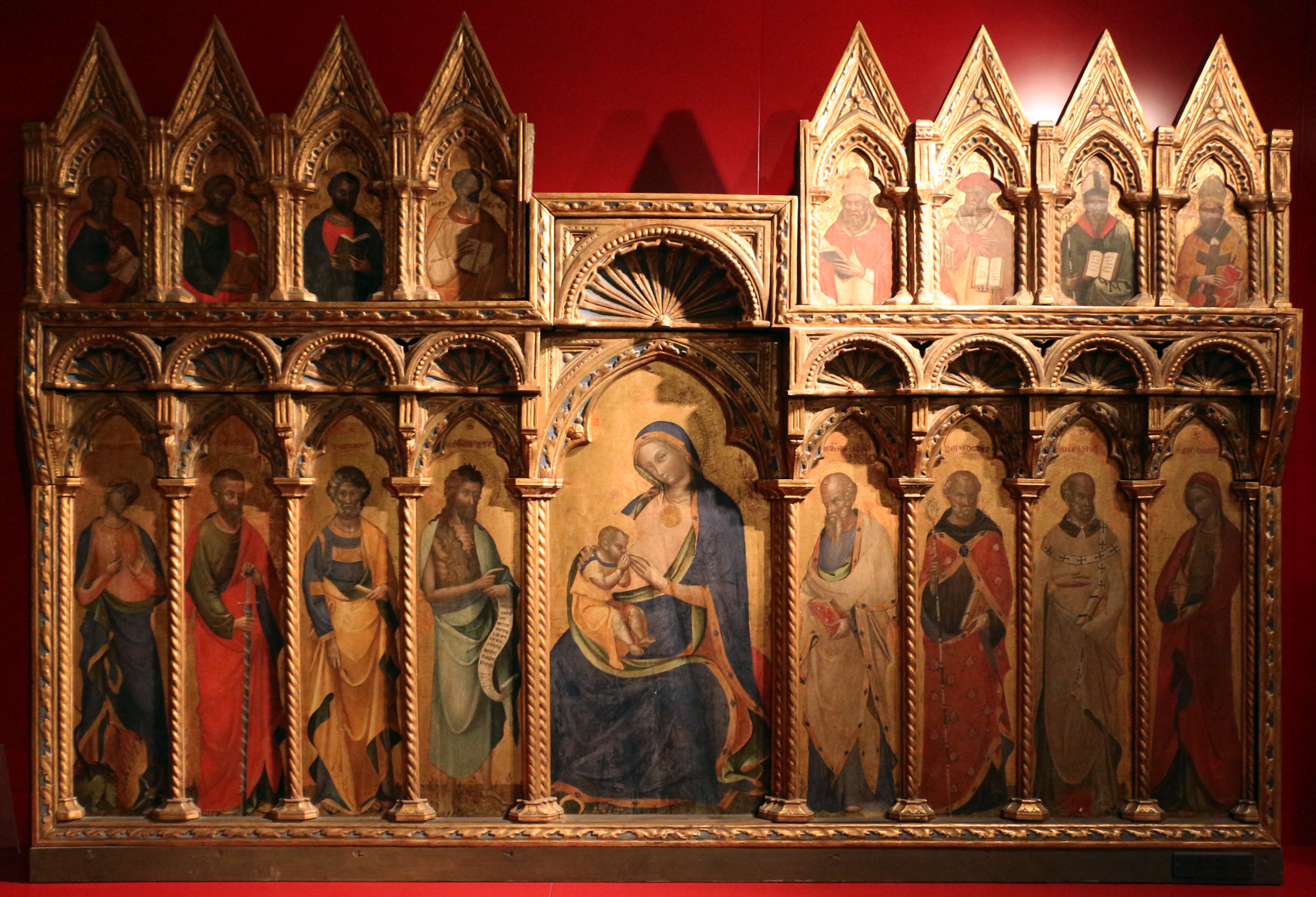
Gothic polyptych by Lorenzo Veneziano (1357–1379), from a church in Lecce, on display at the Provincial Museum of Sigismondo Castromediano

The Museo Sigismondo Castromediano, in Lecce, was founded in 1868 by the Duke of Cavallino Sigismondo Castromediano, an Italian archaeologist, literate, and patriot. It is the oldest museum in Apulia. Initially housed in a former convent of the Celestines, it was acquired by the provincial administration in 1967 and it was moved to the building of the former Argento College in 1979. The museum has five sections: the didactic section, which shows all the sites of art-historical relevance; the antiques sections, with Attican vases with black and red figures and Italic vases from the 6th and 5th centuries B.C, and other archaeological finds, such as bronze statues, coins, and tombstones with Messapian inscriptions; the topography section, with ancient maps of Salento; the Pinacotheca, with paintings from the 14th to 18th centuries from the Venetian and Neapolitan schools, as well as some Romanesque and Renaissance sculptures; and the Sala mostre ("exhibition hall"), with works by artists from the 19th and 20th centuries. The same building houses the provincial library and a large study room.

=== Archaeological Civic Museum ===
Founded in 1934 in Canosa di Puglia, the Museo Civico Archeologico di Palazzo Iliceto was housed in the 18th-century Casieri Palace until 2005. It currently occupies the Iliceto Palace, from the same century. The museum has a collection of about 2,000 archaeological finds collected in excavations carried out in Canosa di Puglia and in tombs from the 5th to 3rd centuries B.C. Among them are inscriptions, sculptures, bas-reliefs, marbles, coins, jewelry, vases and other ceramics dating back around 1,500 years (from the 6th century B.C. to the 10th century A.D.), and some prehistoric pieces. Among others, there are Daunian, Roman, Paleochristian and Byzantine relics.

=== Diocesan Museum of Trani ===
The Museo Diocesano di Trani is owned by the Archdiocese of Trani-Barletta-Bisceglie. It was founded in 1975 on the initiative of Archbishop Giuseppe Carata to properly accommodate the tombstones, sculptures, and other stone pieces that resulted from demolitions carried out in the cathedral and other churches in the city of Trani. Over the years its collection has been expanded with other works and finds of high artistic and historical value. The museum has several sections spread around the Addazi Palace and the Lodispoto Palace. The headquarters is in the latter, where the highlights are a collection of tombstones from the 6th to the 18th centuries; the Chapter Treasury, which includes liturgical objects; an exhibition of the construction works of the local archbishops between the 14th century and the present; and an archaeological section that includes finds from the 6th millennium B.C. The Addazi Palace houses the art gallery, where paintings from the Trani Cathedral are on display.

=== Diocesan Museum of Taranto ===
The MuDi - Museo Diocesano di arte sacra di Taranto was opened in 2011 by Archbishop Benigno Luigi Papa and is housed in the former archdiocesan seminary of Taranto, a 16th-century old town building. It has more than 300 works of heritage from a period ranging from the 17th to the 20th century on display, including religious furniture, relics, paintings, and sculptures of great cultural value, mainly from churches no longer open to worship. Highlights are the "Treasure of Catald," which includes the gold cross found on the saint's chest during work on the 11th-century cathedral, ancient reliquaries with the tongue of Saint Cataldo, and the blood of Saint Vitus. In the painting collection, highlights include Corrado Giaquinto's The Dream of Saint. Joseph, an Ecce Homo by Paolo de Matteis, and several contemporary religious paintings donated by Archbishop Benigno Papa. One of the museum's unique pieces is a Brazilian topaz from King Ferdinand II of the Two Sicilies, with a carved figure of Jesus, noted as the world's greatest jewel.

=== Museum of the High Tavoliere (San Severo) ===
The Museum of the High Tavoliere (Museo dell'alto Tavoliere) in city of San Severo has a large collection of archeological finds from the surrounding countryside, dating from to the Paleolithic to Medieval times. Its collection includes Grecian-style pottery and artefacts and it hosts one of the most important collection of the Daunians. It also hosts a small art gallery. The collection is maintained in a former Franciscan monastery. "Alto Tavoliere Museum".

=== Diocesan Museum of Lucera ===
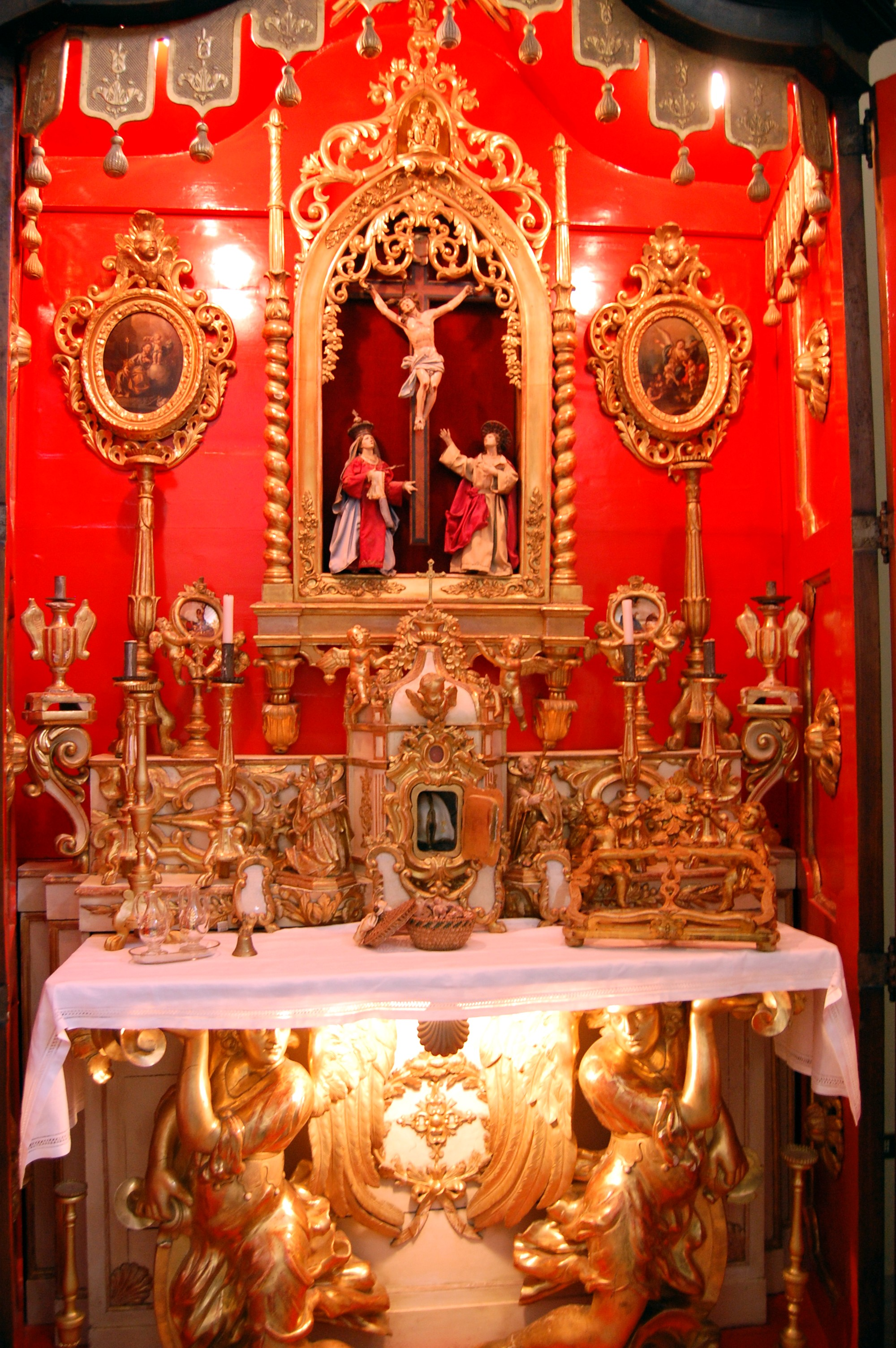
18th or 19th century cupboard in the Diocesan Museum of Lucera

Opened in 1999, the Museo Diocesano di Lucera is housed in the Episcopal Palace of Lucera. In addition to the collection of paintings of the bishops of Lucera-Troia, it has on display several pieces from different eras, most of them from Lucero churches that have been deactivated. Highlights include a red jade ciborium from the 13th century, a diptych of the Sulmona school in gilded silver leaf from the 14th century, a linen coat with embroidery, the stole and hat of Augustine Kažotić (14th century), the wool cape of Franciscan saint Francis Fasani (17th–18th centuries), a chancel cabinet (private altar) with a gilded wooden altarpiece (18th or 19th century) and several reliquaries.

=== Aurelio Marena Diocesan Museum ===
Also known as Monsignor Aurelio Marena Museum and Monsignor Aurelio Marena Pinacotheca Museum ("Museo Pinacoteca Monsignor Aurelio Marena"), it opened in 1969. It is the museum of the Archdiocese of Bari-Bitonto, which brings together the artistic heritage of the Bitonto Cathedral. The museum has two major sections: a Pinacotheca and a Romanesque lapidarium. The first operates in the seminary building, built in the first half of the 18th century, and the second on the first floor of the episcopal palace. The painting collection includes a Virgin with Child by Anthony van Dyck, an Adoration of the Shepherds by Marco Pino from 1576, a Resurrection of Lazarus by Francesco de Mura from the 1730s, and a fragment of a wooden icon with the Hodegetria Virgin, a Byzantine work from the 12th century. There is also a section dedicated to the 17th-century Bitontine school of painting. The rest of the exhibition includes frescoes, sculptures, religious furniture and objects, Sèvres vases, and decorative elements taken from the cathedral, namely the iconostasis and the ciborium, from the period between the 12th and 20th centuries.

=== Corrado Giaquinto Pinacotheca ===
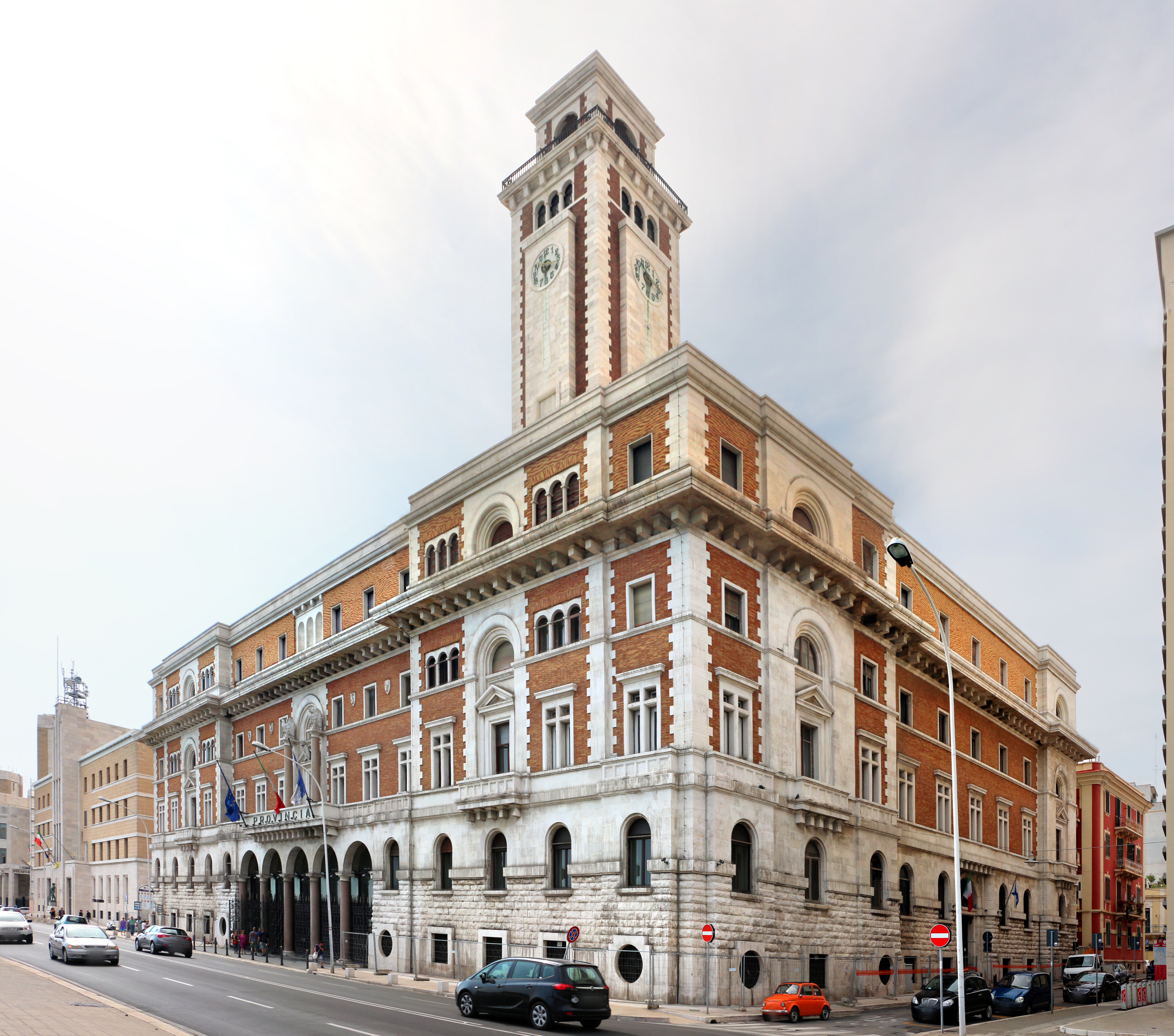
The Province Palace, a 1935 building that houses the Corrado Giaquinto Pinacotheca

Also known as the Provincial Pinacotheca of Bari and the Metropolitan Pinacotheca of Bari, it was founded in 1928 and was initially housed in the local government palace, having been moved in 1936 to the Provincial Palace on Bari's monumental waterfront. The pinacotheca has collections of the Apulian and Neapolitan schools of painting from the late Middle Ages, the Venetian school from the 15th and 16th centuries, by Corrado Giaquinto (1703–1765), Neapolitan and Southern Italian paintings from the 19th century, as well as more recent artworks. The Venetian painting section features works by Bartolomeo Vivarini (1430–1491), Giovanni Bellini (1433–1516), Paris Bordon (1500–1571), Tintoretto (1519–1594), and Palma il Giovane (1548–1628). Other famous painters with works in the museum are Luca Giordano (1634–1705), Francesco De Mura (1696–1782), Giuseppe De Nittis (1846–1884), Giovanni Boldini (1842–1931), Giorgio de Chirico (1888–1978) and Giorgio Morandi (1890–1964). There are also medieval Apulian maiolicas, Neapolitan nativity scenes, and antique pieces of clothing.

=== Giuseppe De Nittis Pinacotheca ===
The Pinacoteca Giuseppe De Nittis, in Barletta, houses the largest collection of the famous local Impressionist painter Giuseppe De Nittis (1846–1884), consisting of 146 paintings and 65 drawings, which were donated to the city in 1914 by his widow. Initially housed in a former Dominican convent, it was moved to the Barletta Castle and finally to the Della Marra Palace, a 16th-century baroque building, where the museum has been operating since 2007.

=== National Gallery of Apulia ("Girolamo and Rosaria Devanna" Gallery) ===
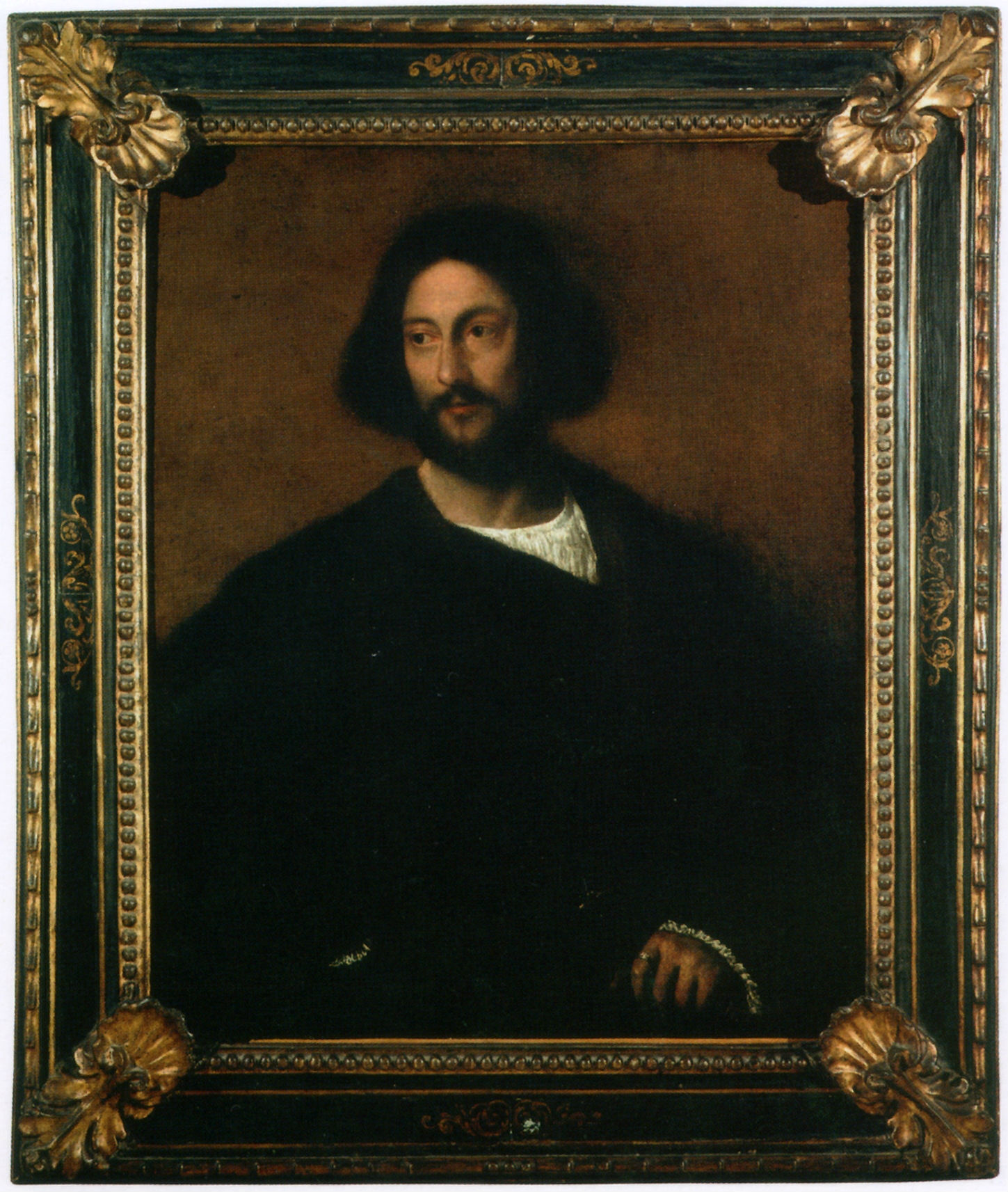
Portrait of a Gentleman, by Titian, 16th century, at the National Gallery of Apulia

The National Gallery of Apulia is the first such national gallery in the region and one of the most prestigious. It was opened in 2009 and operates in the Sylos-Calò Palace, a Renaissance building from the first half of the 16th century. The collection was assembled by the brothers Girolamo and Rosaria Devanna, who donated a large part of their artistic collections to the state in 2004. It consists of 229 paintings and 108 drawings by important artists, mostly Italian, dating between the 16th and early 20th centuries.

=== Treasure of the Basilica of the Holy Sepulchre ===
Located in the Basilica of the Holy Sepulchre ("Basilica del Santo Sepolcro") in Barletta, one of the most important churches in Barletta, likely built in the 11th century, this museum has on display several religious gold pieces, some from Palestine, dating back to the first decades of the 13th century. Among them is a double patriarchal cross containing a piece of the True Cross, which according to tradition is said to have been taken to Barletta in 1291 by the patriarch of Jerusalem after the Muslim takeover of Acre.

=== Civic Museum of Paleontology and Man (MUPAU) ===
The Museo Civico della Paleontologia e dell'Uomo, opened in 2002, is housed in the Maiorano Palace in Lizzano, a manor building from the mid-19th century. It has an important collection of fossils dating back 600 million years, found in the region and around the world. Besides the paleontology section, it has a large archaeology section, with pieces ranging from the Neolithic to the Middle Ages. Traditional tools for work and domestic use are also on display. Other sections are devoted to cultures of Africa and Oceania and contemporary art.

Museums in Apulia
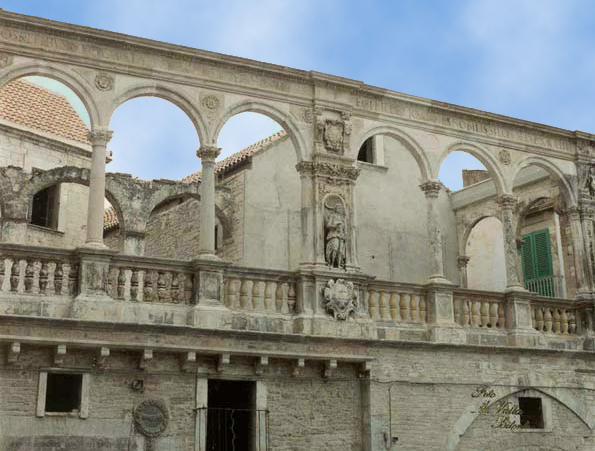
Renaissance palace of Sylos-Calò (1st half of the 16th century), in Bitonto, where the National Gallery of Apulia is located

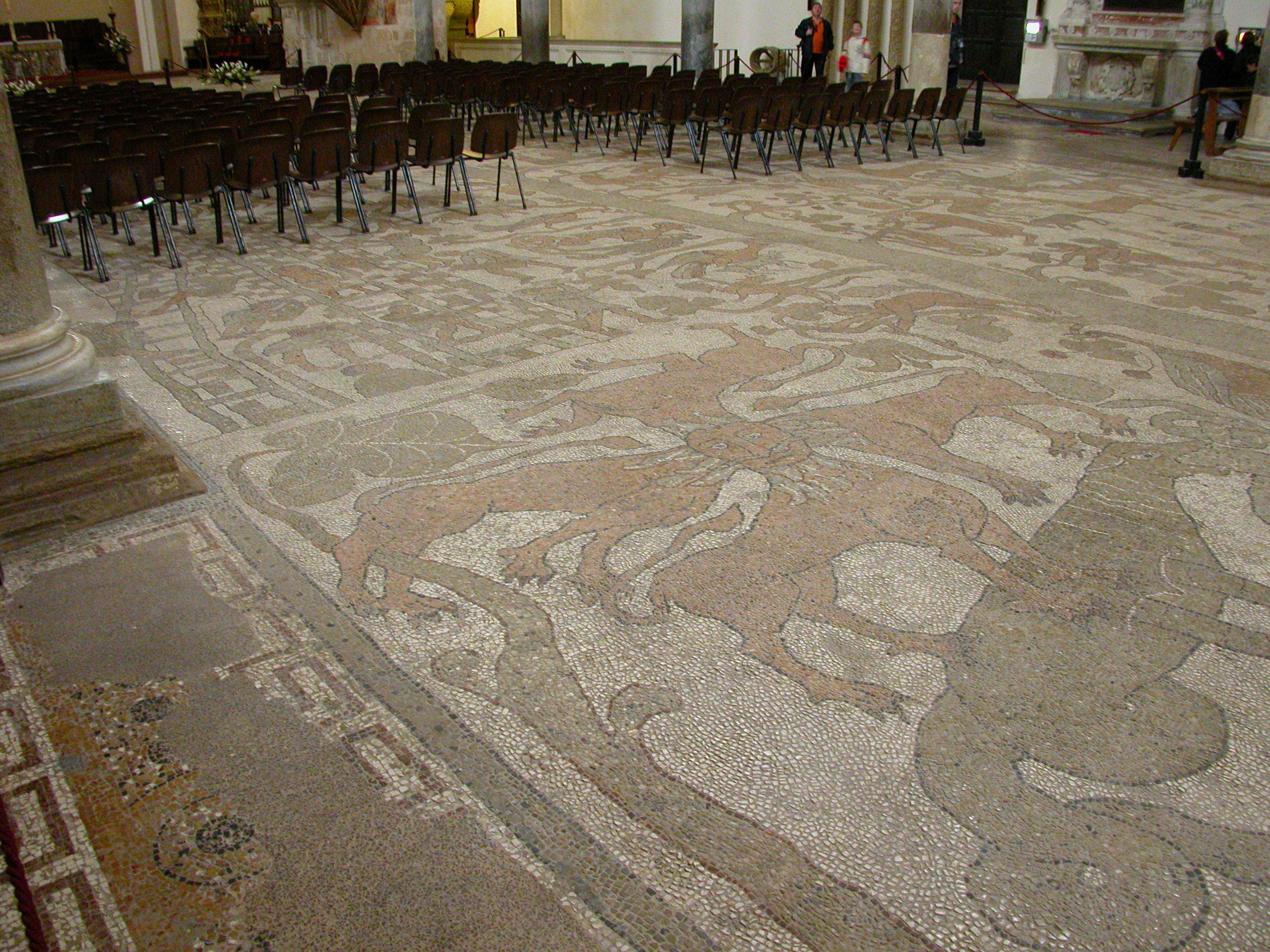
Mosaic in the Otranto Cathedral

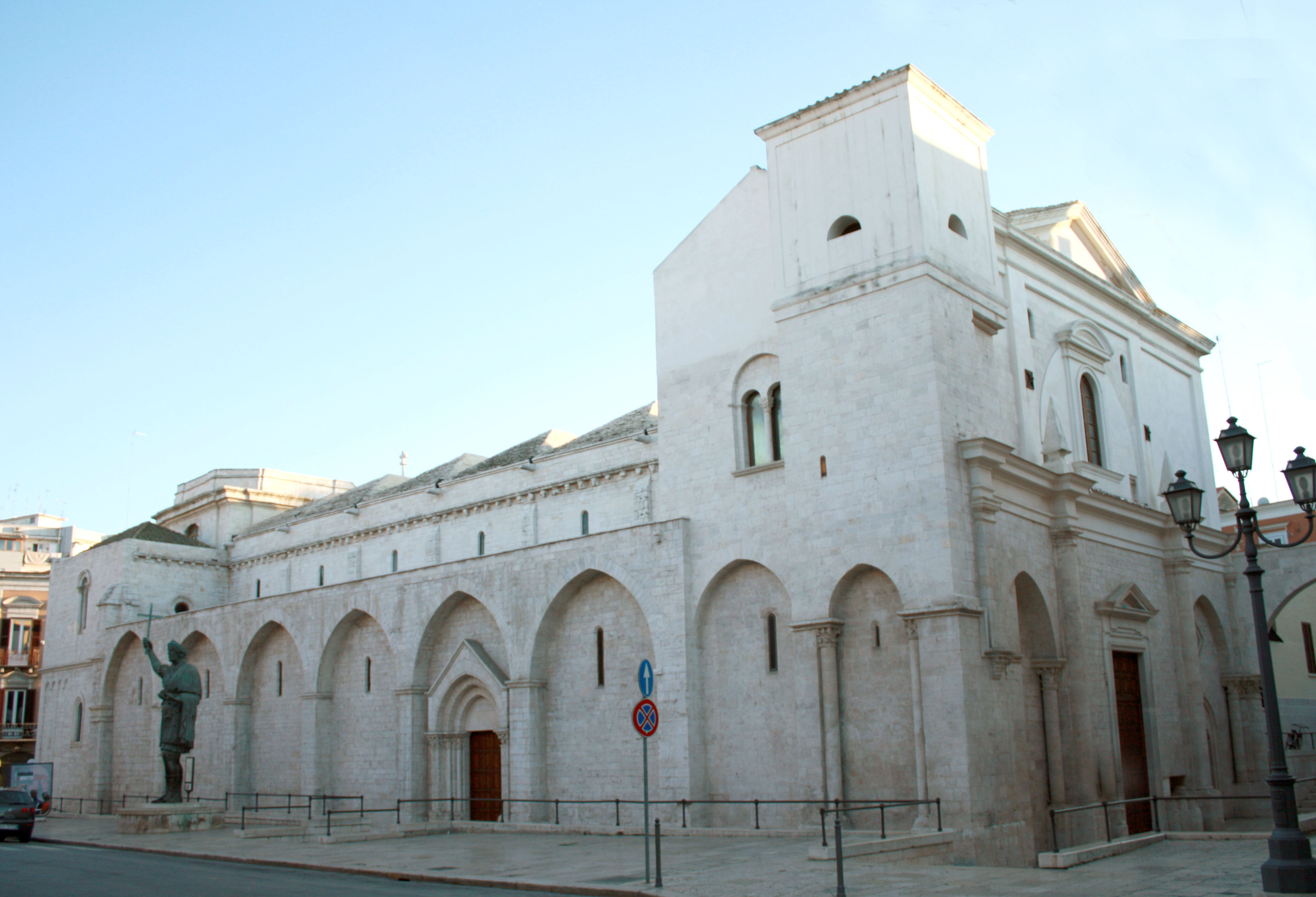
Basilica of the Holy Sepulchre in Barletta

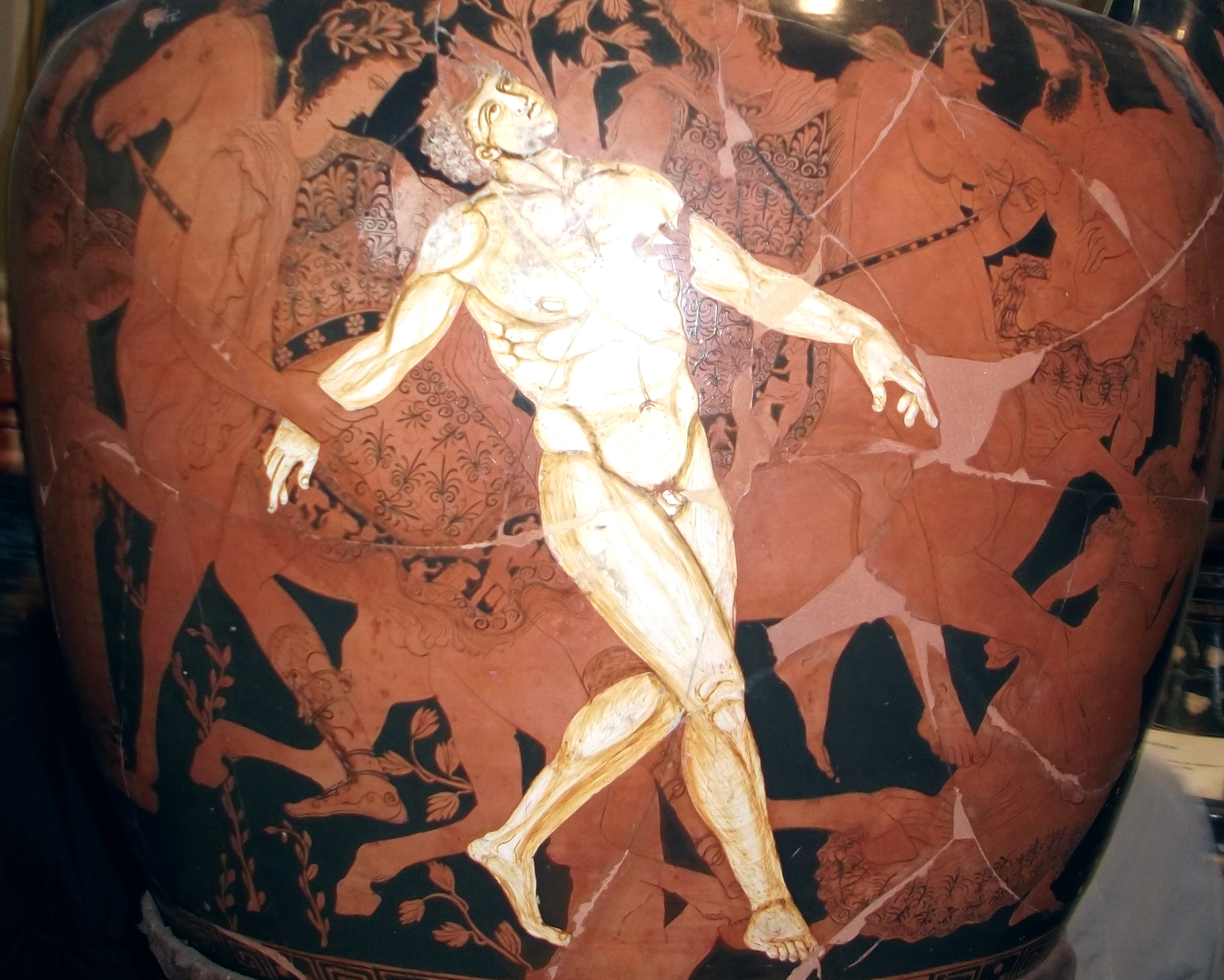
Detail of the Apulian krater of Talos

== Theater ==
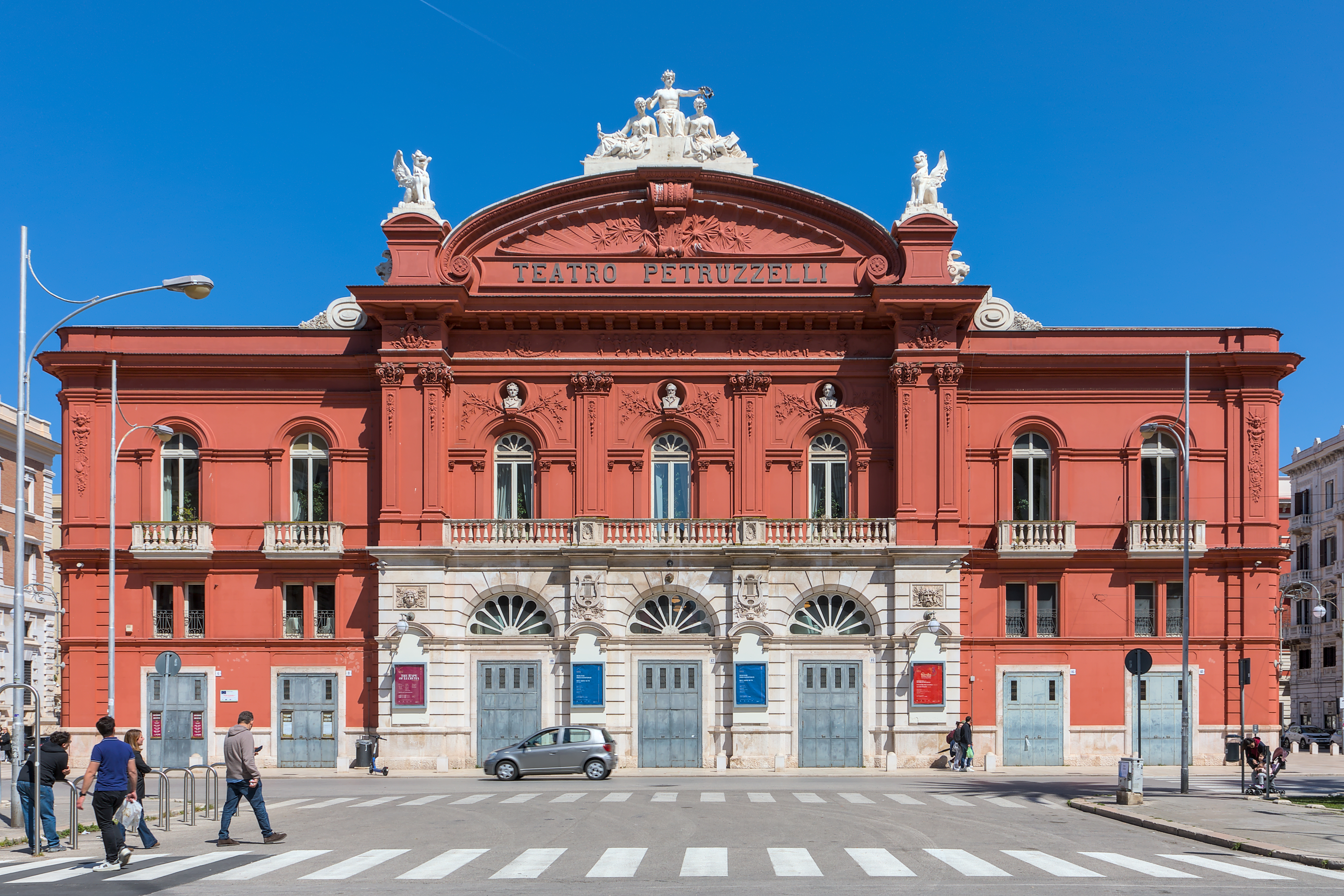
Petruzzelli Theater in Bari, the fourth largest theater in Italy

Alongside a fairly solid vernacular tradition, rooted above all in Bari and its province, in recent years numerous experimental plays have emerged, with new ideas circulating and new performers, which attract the interest of national theater companies and are appreciated outside the region. The only Apulian public institution dedicated specifically to the management, coordination, and financing of theatrical activities is the Teatro Pubblico Pugliese, active since the 2000s and responsible for most of the funding to the sector.

Bari's Teatro Petruzzelli is the fourth largest theater in Italy and is sometimes touted as the largest private theater in Europe. It opened in 1903 and reopened in 2009 after being restored following a fire in 1991. Bari's Teatro Piccinni opened in 1854 and closed temporarily in 2009 for restoration, and is scheduled to reopen in 2019. Teatro Team is another theater in Bari, founded in the late 1990s. The Teatro Margherita, in the same city, was opened in 1914 and closed in 1980. It has the peculiarity of being built on stilts, which allegedly makes it the only theater in the world built over the sea. In 2009, this theater began to be restored, initially with the intention to be used again as a theater, but now being home to a museum. The Teatro Umberto Giordano in Foggia was opened in 1828 and restored in 2014. In Bitonto one finds the Teatro Traetta, which opened in 1938 and reopened in 2005 after being closed for almost fifty years. The Teatro Curci in Barletta was opened in 1872. The Teatro Verdi in San Severo opened in 1937 and replaced one of the oldest theaters in southern Italy, the Teatro Real Borbone, which opened in 1919 and closed in 1927. The Teatro Politeama Greco in Lecce was the second major theater in southern Italy after the famous Teatro di San Carlo in Naples. It opened with a performance of the opera Aida.

== Literature ==
The 3rd century B.C. Tarantine Livius Andronicus is considered the founder of Roman epic poetry. He translated the Odyssey into Latin and introduced several other Greek literary genres to Rome. He also wrote a play which is considered the first literary work written in Latin (before him Latin works were oral) and was premiered in Rome in 240 B.C. Another Apulian artist of the same century, Ennius was a poet and dramatist who is also considered one of the fathers of Roman literature. He was born in Rudiae, an originally Messapian town situated very close to what is today Lecce. He wrote an important epic poem for Latin culture (the Annales) and other works of various genres. Pacuvius (220-130 B.C.) was another important playwright and poet. Likely born in Brindisi, in a Greek-Oscan cultural area, he was the nephew of Ennius. Pacuvius moved to Rome, where he became a painter and poet.

During the 18th century, the Apulian intellectuals, unlike those of Naples and Milan, did not initially adhere to Enlightenment principles. An impetus in this direction was however given by Ferrante de Gemmis, a noble literate and philosopher (1732–1803), who collected the teachings of Antonio Genovesi and founded the Enlightenment Academy in Terlizzi, his hometown, ca. 1760. When the bourgeoisie became self-aware in the 19th century, an active scientific, legal, economic, and administrative culture developed. At the same time, as a consequence of the annexation of the Kingdom of the Two Sicilies to the Kingdom of Italy (1861), the phenomenon of brigandage spread, which gave rise to the main theme of the so-called southern literature. This cultural trend has magazines such as Valdemaro Vecchi's Rassegna Pugliese, which would be the starting point for the development of the publishing house Laterza.

The 20th century was marked by profound Southern reflections and anti-fascist sentiments. One of the examples of this is Tommaso Fiore, a Meridionalist and socialist, who fought for autonomy, for Meridionalist federalism, for the living conditions of the populations, especially of the peasants, and who was the guide of a group of young intellectuals.

One of the great exponents of Apulian culture in the 20th century was Carmelo Bene, actor, playwright, and filmmaker. More recently, former judge and senator Gianrico Carofiglio has been successful with his novels that have Bari as their setting. As a judge, Carofiglio got popular due to anti-Mafia cases.

== Music ==
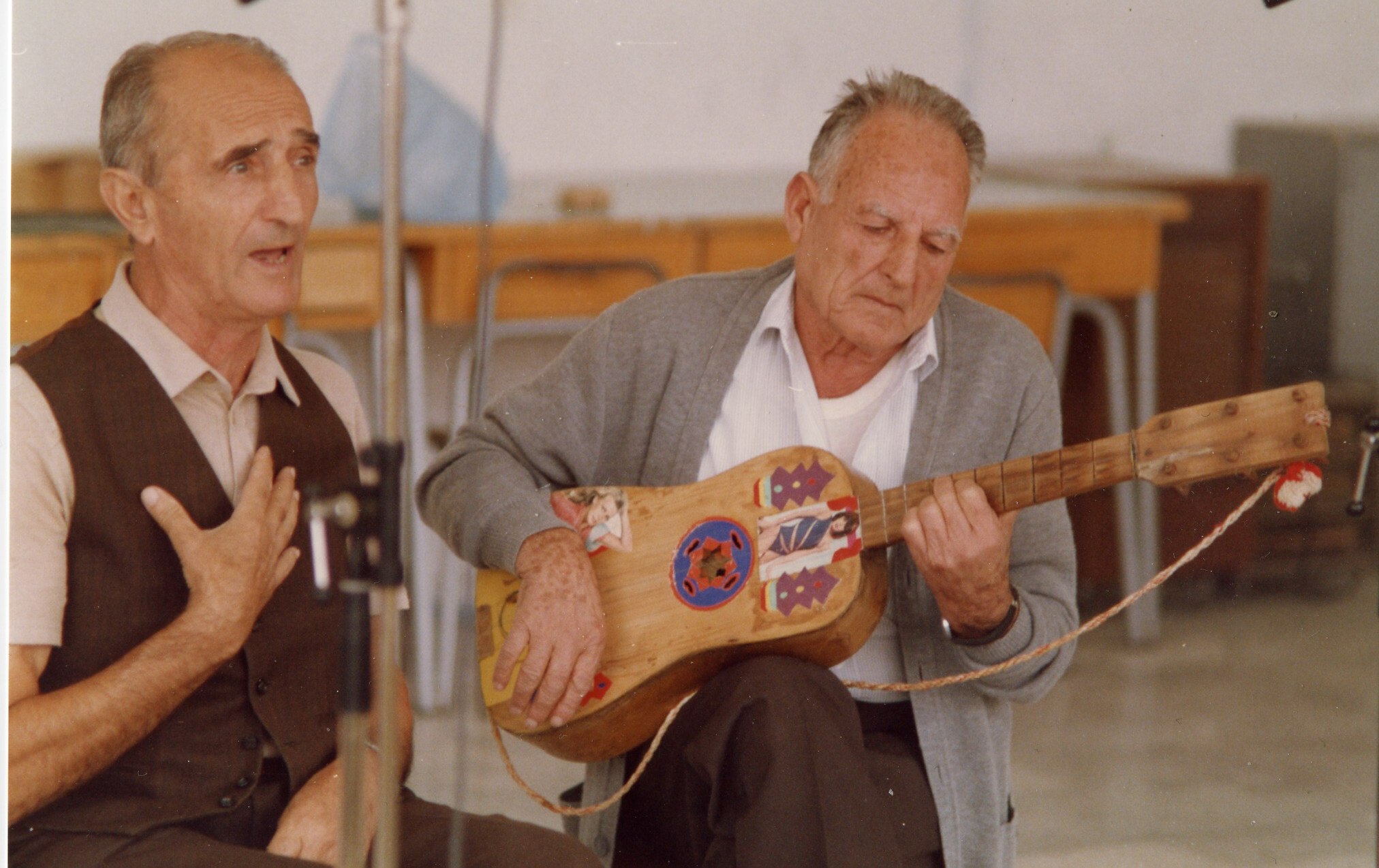
Andrea Sacco and Antonio Piccininno, two of the most notable interpreters, now deceased, of Carpino's tarantella in Gargano

As in most of southern Italy, Apulia's musical tradition is closely tied to traditional dances. A folk dance of particular anthropological interest is the pizzica (or taranto), present mainly in Salento and Taranto, which is danced in pairs. It was once danced not only on festive occasions but also during rituals to cure tarantate (tarantism), a convulsive hysterical phenomenon that was attributed to tarantula bites. The studies carried out by the ethnologist Ernesto de Martino and collected in his 1959 work La terra del rimorso focused on the phenomenon of tarantism and showed its links to hysteria, epilepsy, and depression. Although tarantism may be considered extinct, the music that accompanied it in recent years has been the subject of a rediscovery that has crossed regional boundaries and culminates annually in the busy Notte della Taranta ("Nights of the Taranta") festival, held each year in Grecìa Salentina.

A famous Apulian musician was Matteo Salvatore (1925–2005), a composer and singer of folk and traditional music who was a performer of traditional Gargano songs. Another notable musician in the folk area is Eugenio Bennato, a singer-songwriter who despite being a native of Naples, is one of the main driving forces of Taranta Power, a movement that aims to promote and spread Taranto and traditional Apulian music, which has been done through shows, publications, support for groups, the organization of events, and the creation of schools and workshops. Another world-renowned singer-songwriter and composer with connections to Apulia was Lucio Dalla, who lived there for some time, mainly in Manfredonia and the Tremiti Islands (1943–2012).

== Cuisine ==
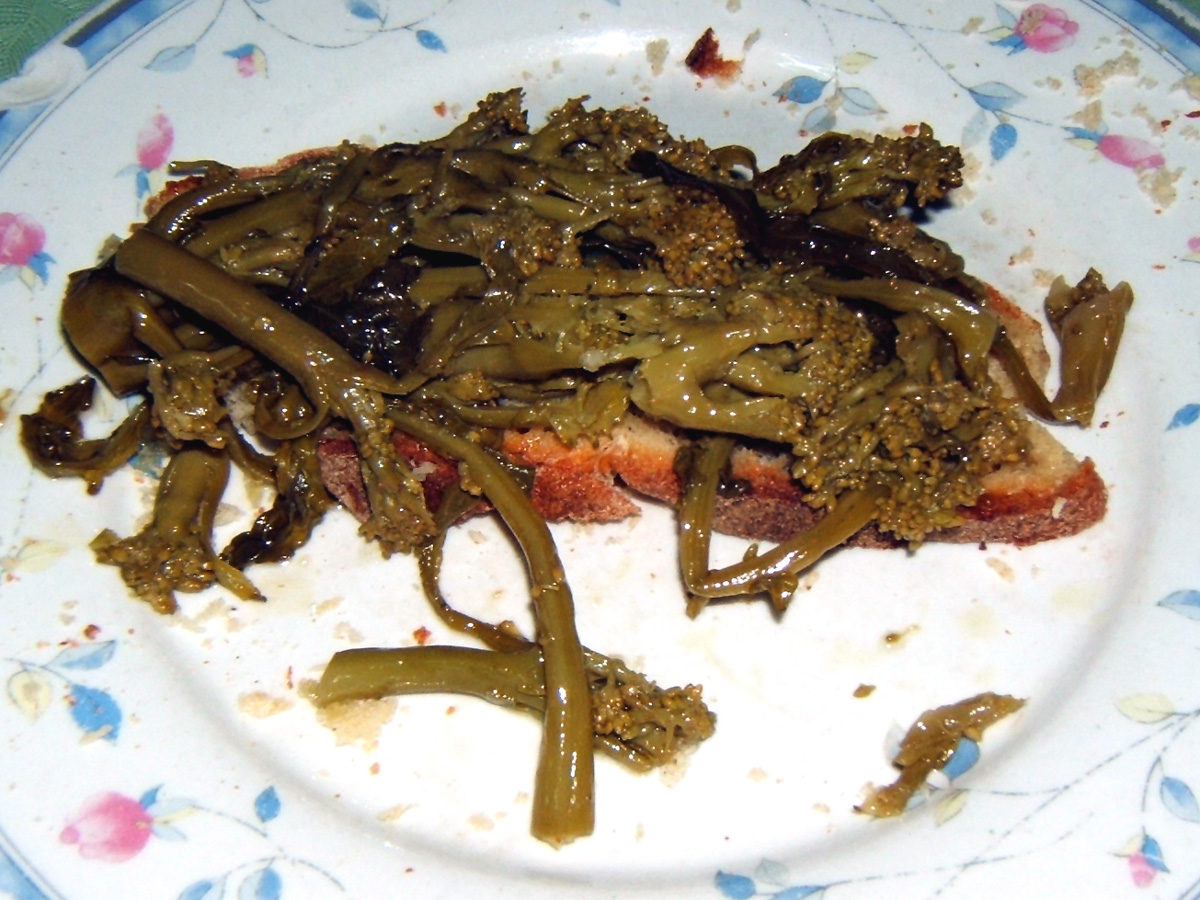
Cime di rape, a traditional savory dish based on rapini.

Apulian cuisine is diverse, both in recipes and in the numerous ingredients, which vary according to the seasons. Many vegetables are used, such as cime di rape (Brassica rapa sylvestris) (rapini), cabbage, cardoon, artichoke, chicory, bell pepper, eggplant, beans, lentils, chickpeas, fava beans (the one from Carpino being famous), onions (the one from Acquaviva delle Fonti being famous), as well as all seafood, especially from the Adriatic Sea and the Gulf of Taranto. The latter has a particular characteristic, resulting from the water of the Piccolo Sea and the freshwater springs (locally called citri) that flow into it and soften the salinity without affecting the taste of the fish.

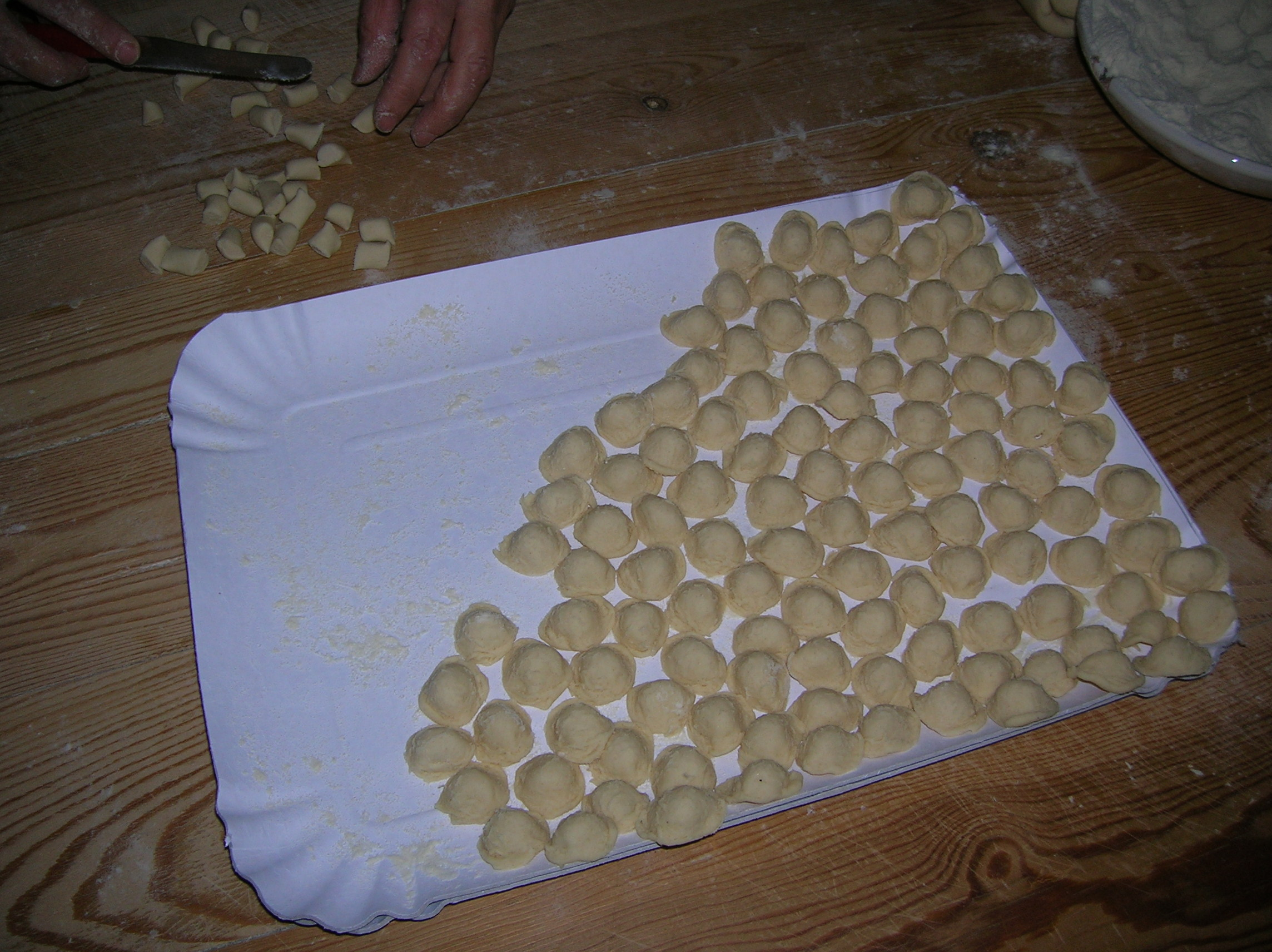
Apulian Orecchiette

One of the best-known typical dishes is orecchiette al ragù di carne (ear-shaped pasta with meat stew), but also well-known are orecchiette con le cime di rape (pasta with rapini), cicoria con la purea di fave (chicory with fava beans purée) and others more linked to the sea, as cavatelli con le cozze (cavatelli with mussels) risotto ai frutti di mare (reafood risotto), polpo alla griglia (octopus on the grill), riso al forno alla barese (rice in the oven Bari style), also called riso, patate e cozze (rice, potatoes and mussels). Among the typical Salento dishes there are municeddhi (snails), involtini (lamb giblet rolls), which have various names and are also present in the province of Foggia where they are called torcinelli, ciceri e tria and pezzetti di cavallo (horse meat with sauce).

As for meats, those of the Itria valley are particularly famous, especially those of Cisternino, Crispiano, and Martina Franca, where there is the only norcineria (a place dedicated solely to the slaughter and processing of pigs) in Apulia, where the typical capocollo is produced. Besides this sausage, the zampina of Sammichele di Bari, and the prosciutto di Faeto, a ham from the municipality of Faeto, in the Daunos hills, are also worth mentioning.

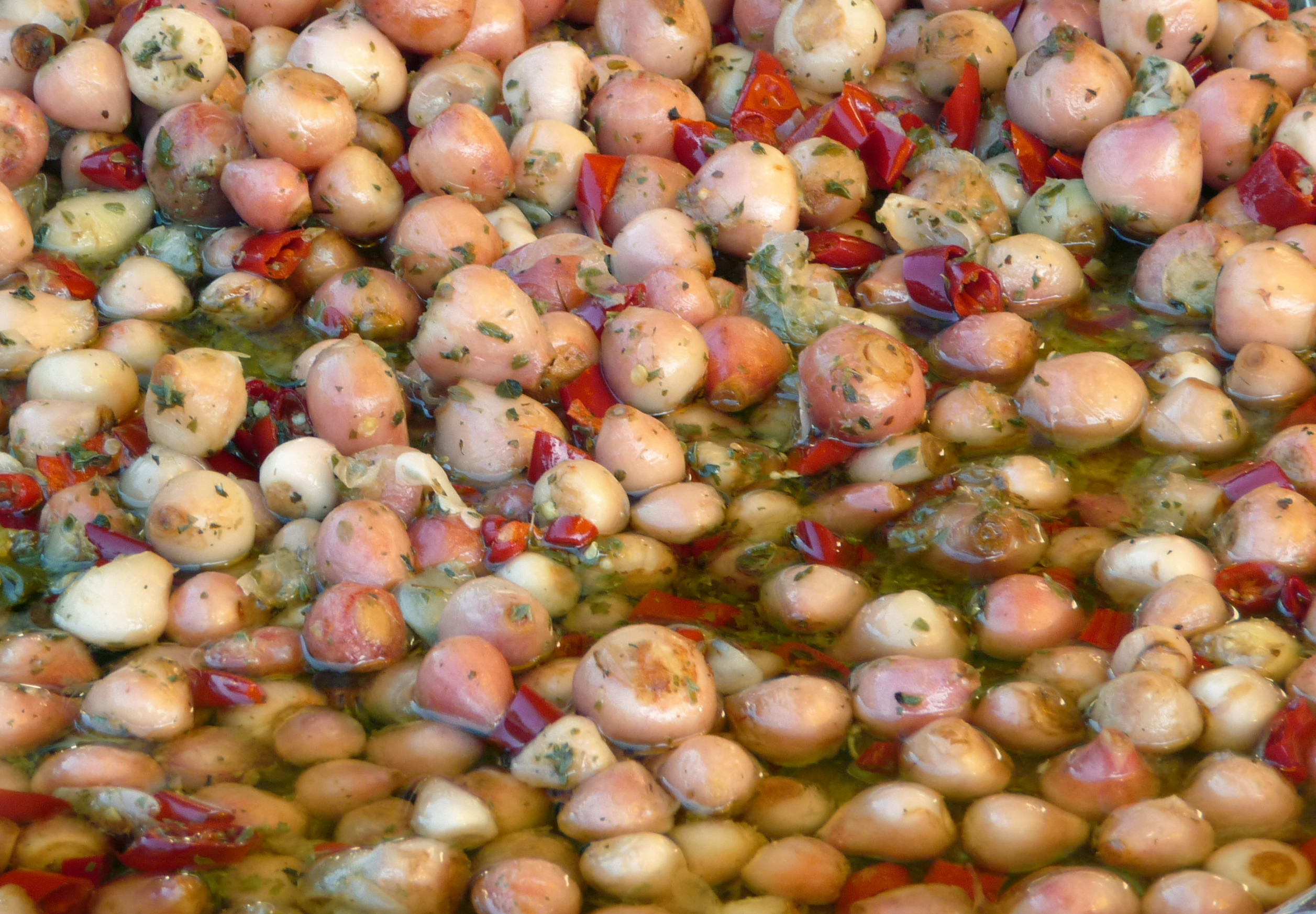
Lampascioni sott'olio (Leopoldia comosa bulbs in oil)

Among the products with Apulia-protected designation of origin are:

- Fruits - orange from Gargano, lemon femminiello from Gargano and clementine from the Gulf of Taranto
- Olives - bella' from Daunia and bella from Cerignola
- Olive oils - Dauno, Terra di Bari, Collina di Brindisi, Terre Tarentine and Terra d'Otranto
- Cheeses - caciocavallo silano (cow's milk) and canestrato pugliese (merino sheep's milk)
- Others - Altamura bread

There are also numerous Apulian wines with protected designations of origin (DOC, DOCG, and IGT).

== Traditions and folklore ==
=== La Fòcara ===
A festival in Novoli commemorating the local patron saint, Anthony the Great, which has its high point on January 16 and 17, although it runs from January 7 to 18. The main attraction is a bonfire made up of thousands of bundles of vine branches that are stacked to form a huge cylinder, which is illuminated by a profusion of fireworks on the night of the 16th to the 17th. On the so-called "Days of Fire" there are numerous pyrotechnic shows and contests. In the more genuinely religious aspect, another important event is a procession and the blessing of animals - according to tradition, Saint Anthony, the "Saint of the Fire", was a pig keeper and protects domestic animals. The festivity has been held at least since 1664, the year it was made official by Bishop Luigi Pappacoda.

=== Tavole di San Giuseppe ===
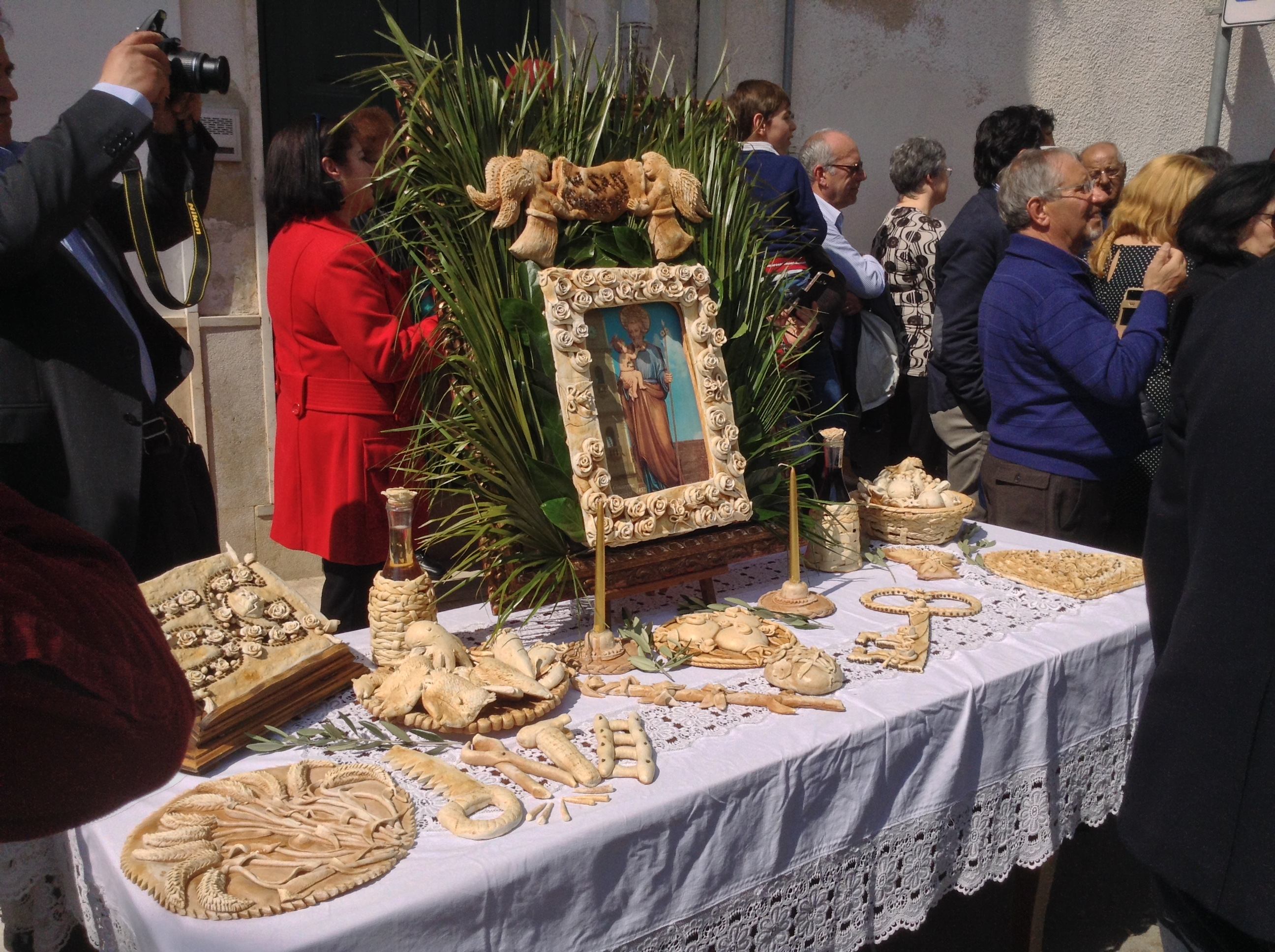
Tavola di San Giuseppe in San Marzano di San Giuseppe

This is an ancient tradition celebrated in Cocumola (Minervino di Lecce), San Marzano di San Giuseppe, Uggiano la Chiesa, Giurdignano and Lizzano, on March 18 and 19, in which large tables are prepared with typical dishes in honor of Saint Joseph. During the visit to the taula one can taste the lu cranu stumpatu and the pasta culli ciciri or the vermiceddhri, i.e. wheat and pasta with chickpeas.

=== Fiera di San Giorgio ===
Celebrated during the 4th week of April at the Saint George's Fair in Gravina, it is the oldest regional fair in Italy, attested to in a 1294 document issued by King Charles II of Naples ordering its restoration. Dedicated mainly to agriculture, crafts, gastronomy, and wine, one of the attractions is the reenactment of the first editions of the fair in the Middle Ages.

=== Holy Week in Molfetta ===
Lenten celebrations in Molfetta begin with the procession of the Cross on Ash Wednesday, the day after Carnival. The other highlights are the procession of the Virgin Addolorata (Our Lady of Sorrows) on the afternoon of Good Friday. On Friday night into Saturday, at 03:00 in the morning, the procession of the Five Mysteries leaves Saint Stephen's Church. On Holy Saturday, the Pietá procession leaves from the Church of Purgatory (Santa Maria Consolatrice degli Afflitti).

=== Holy Week in Taranto ===
During Holy Week, several rituals are performed, including day and night processions with hooded men, namely that of the Madonna Addolorata and the "Mysteries". The celebrations, noted by some as among the oldest in Italy, date back to at least 1703, when a local nobleman, Don Diego Calò, commissioned images of the Addolorata and of the Dead Jesus in Naples that are still used in the processions today. The celebrations are organized by Taranto's more than 20 confraternities, some of them founded in the 16th century.

=== Holy Week in Francavilla Fontana ===
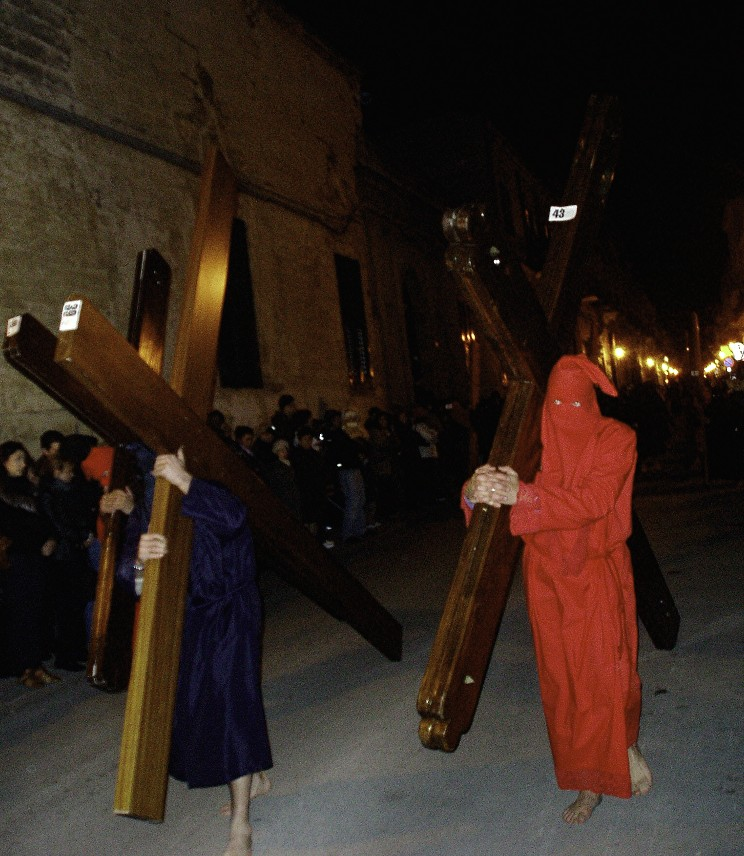
Pappamusci in the Holy Week at Francavilla Fontana

The Holy Week rites of this town in the province of Brindisi are among the most famous in Apulia. Throughout the night of Holy Thursday and into the early evening of Good Friday, the faithful and the Pappamusci go on a pilgrimage from church to church, where they pause in prayer before the tombs where the Dead Christ lies. The Pappamusci are members of a local brotherhood and wear a white tunic with a cord tied around their waist, a symbol of sacrifice, and a brown scapular on their chest, a sign of belonging to the brotherhood and a privilege of its members. Another local peculiarity is the Crociferi, penitents wearing a tunic and barefoot hooded men who carry a heavy wooden cross on their shoulders. In the procession of the Mysteries, held on Friday evening, the confraternities bring papier-mâché sculptures depicting the last moments of Jesus' life. As in other celebrations of Holy Week in Apulia, the similarities with those practiced in Spain are explained by the fact that their origin dates back to the period when southern Italy was ruled by Spanish monarchs.

=== Processione delle Fracchie ===
The Good Friday night procession in the town of Lamis, in the Gargano countryside, follows wagons with large lit torches (the fracchie), which according to tradition illuminate Our Lady of Sorrows in her search for the dead Jesus. The torches are made from bundles of tree trunks, conical in shape and open lengthwise, which become authentic walking bonfires. The tradition dates back to the 16th or 17th century.

=== Processione della desolata ===
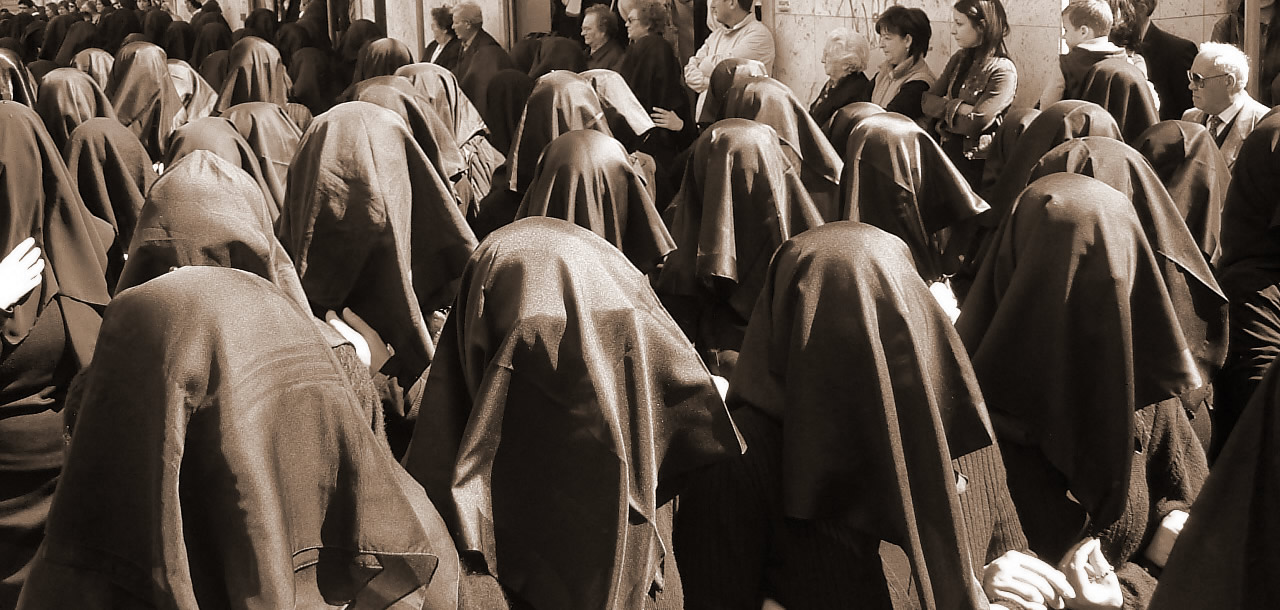
Procession of the desolate in Canosa di Puglia

The procession takes place in Canosa di Puglia on Holy Saturday morning and is known for the participation of hundreds of women dressed in black from head to toe, barefoot, with their faces covered and, being a funeral procession, they sing the Stabat Mater. The procession is also accompanied by girls dressed as angels who carry in their hands objects from the Passion of Jesus, such as nails, whips, and the crown of thorns. The atmosphere is intense and emotional, evocative of the grief of Mary desolated by the death of her son Jesus. A statue of the Virgin Mary with tears in her eyes is dressed in black and holds a white handkerchief in one hand and a crown of thorns and a cross in the other. She is paraded and accompanied by an angel dressed in white, and behind follows the sepulcher of Jesus with a stripped cross, symbolizing the burial of the latter.

=== La 'Nzegna ===
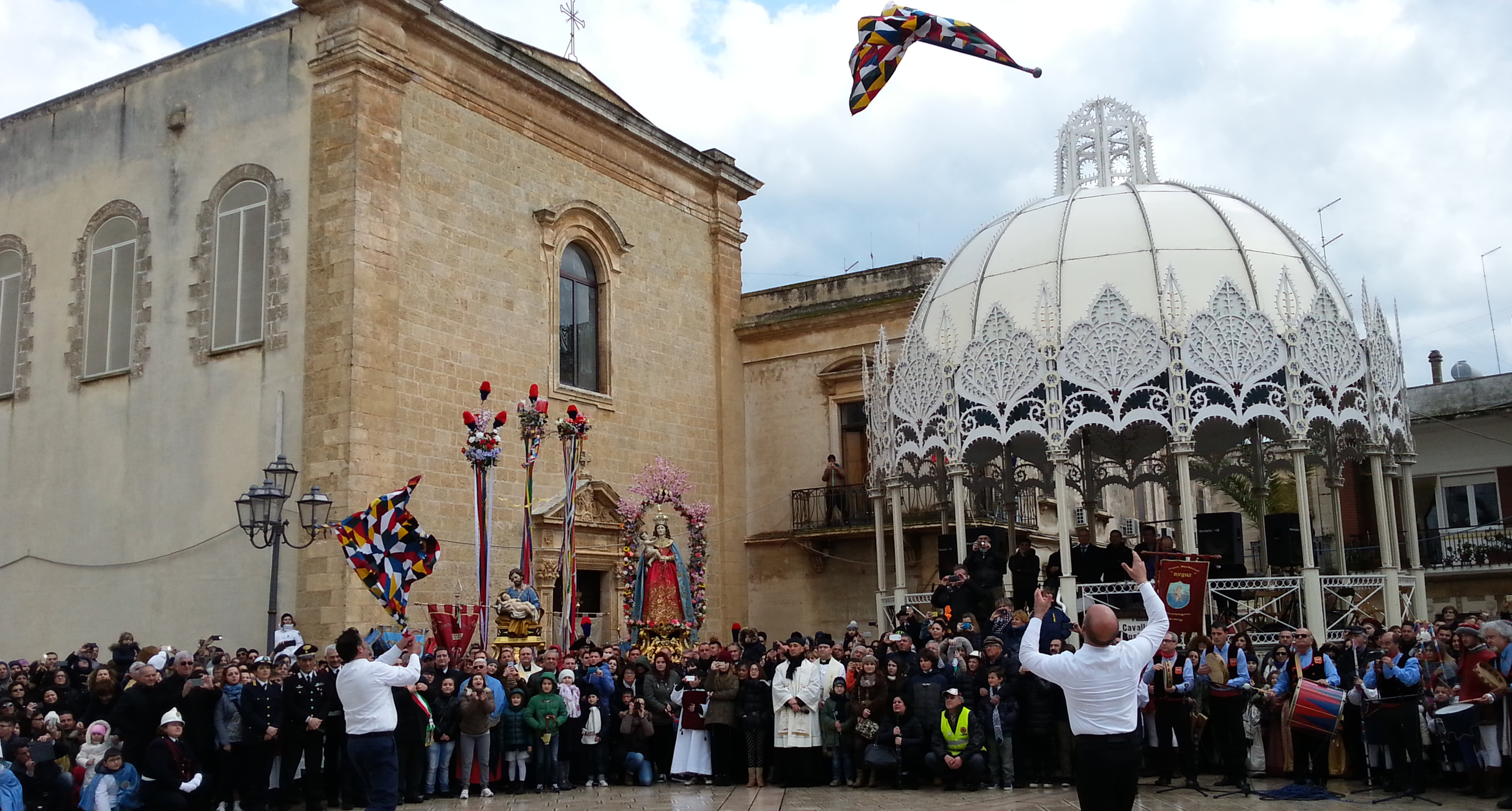
La 'Nzegna in Carovigno

The 'Nzegna is an ancient religious rite celebrated on Easter Monday, Tuesday and Saturday after Easter (March or April), consisting of a game of waving a pair of multicolored flags (the battitura della Nzegna), which are twirled around the neck, legs, and belly and thrown into the air to the sound of music by flute, drum, drums, cymbals. These spectacles are preceded by processions. The festival has been celebrated in honor of Maria Santissima di Belvedere (Our Lady of the Meadow), the patron saint of Carovigno, since the early 12th century.

=== Palio di Taranto (Taranto Prize) ===
Also known as Torneo dei Rioni ("Tournament of Neighborhoods"), it is a rowing competition with traditional wooden boats, initially done by the ten neighborhoods of Taranto, but since 1999 the local police and military forces have also participated. The competition has two phases, the first held on the city's patron saint's day, Saint Cataldo, on May 10, and the second in June or July. The boats go around the island where the historic part of Taranto is located.

=== Festa del Soccorso ===
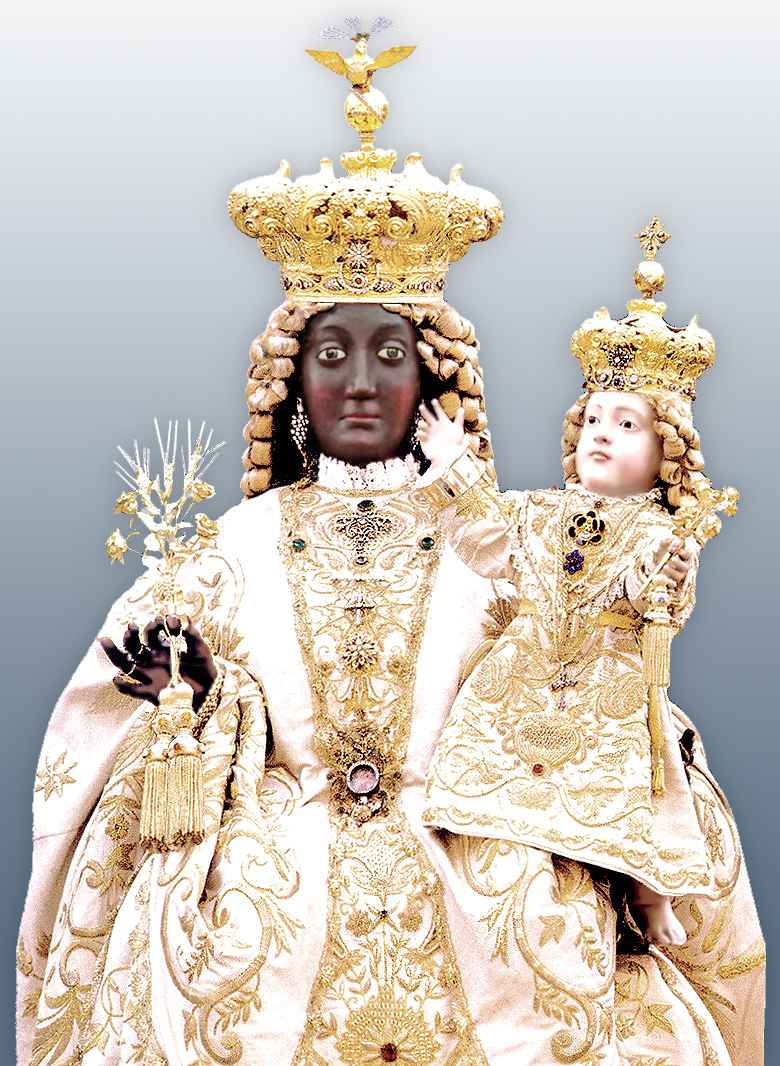
Image of Beata Vergine Maria del Soccorso from the procession in her honor in San Severo

It is a festivity commemorating the patron saints of the city of San Severo. The main patron saint is the Beata Vergine Maria del Soccorso (lit.: Our Lady of Help), whose center of worship was transferred from Palermo to San Severo in 1514 by the Augustinians. The other patron saints are Severinus of Noricum and Severus of Naples. It takes place between the eve of the third Sunday in May and the following Monday. The highlight of the festivity are two processions in which numerous images of saints are carried on shoulders, adorned with the jewels that are usually kept in the treasury of the diocese. During the processions, fireworks prepared by more than twenty neighborhoods are set off. When the fireworks are set off the corsa dei fujenti is held, where young people participate and run next to the fireworks as they explode, in a scenario reminiscent of war, with explosions everywhere and intense smoke. In the 2018 festival, the fires caused serious injury. During the festival, there are decorative night illuminations in the most important streets and a light structure about fifteen meters high is set up in Piazza Incoronazione.

=== Processione del Cavallo Parato ===
This is a procession that takes place on the festivity of Corpus Christi, in which the local archbishop rides on a white steed, carrying an ostensory, out of the cathedral and through the city. The archbishop goes under a baldachin with six stems, which are carried by members of the Sovereign Military Order of Malta and the Equestrian Order of the Holy Sepulchre of Jerusalem. On the way, the crowd throws flowers. As the procession passes the harbor area, all the docked ships turn on their sirens and the archbishop stops in front of the Monument to the Sailor of Italy to bless the waters and then stops in Victory Square to bless the city. The procession, reportedly taking place since 1254, evokes the tradition that during the Seventh Crusade, the King of France Saint Louis was taken prisoner by Saladin at Damietta in Egypt in 1249. The Muslim sovereign agreed to free the Christian king in exchange for a large ransom. Saint Louis was freed, leaving the Blessed Sacrament (bread from the Last Supper) as a pledge, and went to Brindisi, where the Holy Emperor Frederick II gave him the ransom money. The French king returned to Egypt to pay the ransom, which Saladin, impressed by the Christian king's loyalty and faith, refused to accept and returned the bread. On his way back from the Holy Land, Saint Louis was surprised by a storm and went to the beach at Torre Cavallo, near the port of Brindisi. Concerned about saving the Blessed Sacrament, Saint Louis asked for help from the Archbishop of Brindisi, who went to fetch him on a white horse, escorted by the brotherhoods and faithful of Brindisi. Upon arrival in the city, the king and the archbishop were cheered by the population.

The tradition has many anachronisms and inconsistencies to have any historical foundation. (Note: Some of the incongruities of the story of St. Louis in Brindisi: at the Siege of Damietta the Crusaders were victorious. Louis IX was captured at the Battle of Fariskur in 1250 by the Ayyubid Sultan Turanshah or his then Mamluk general Baybars, Saladin died in 1193, 20 years before St. Louis was born, and Frederick II was on good terms with the Ayyubids to the extent that he warned them of the Christian military campaign.) Its first written record dates from the early 17th century and was made by the Salentine physician and literate Girolamo Marciano.

=== La Scamiciata ===
It is a procession that stages the victory over the Turks on June 2, 1678, the day when, after years or centuries of Ottoman invasions, the inhabitants of Fasano defeated the Turks in a pitched battle on the city walls. The procession is headed by flag-bearers and is accompanied by trumpet music and drums, with the participants dressed in period costumes. There are groups representing the noble families of the time, each preceded by the flag with the emblem of the respective family. Some parade on horseback. In the end, there are civil, religious, and military authorities, also wearing period costumes, in antique horse-drawn carriages. There are armed men and halberdiers. At the end, there are songs and dances, and a young man representing General Sindaco of the town offers the keys of the town to the image of Madonna di Pozzo Faceto, the local patron saint. According to tradition, the rebellion that expelled the Turks was organized during the festivity, under the pretext of organizing a "popular tournament". The name of the festivity - La Scamiciata - can be translated as "The pinafore" but can also mean "The Rebellious".

=== Torneo dei Rioni and Corteo Storico ===
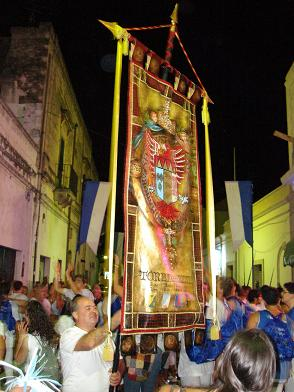
2006 Palio dei Rioni in Oria

This is a festival in Oria in which participants wear medieval costumes. The highlights are a medieval procession on horseback and a tournament of traditional games of dexterity and skill in which teams from the city's neighborhoods compete. The winning district receives a palio (embroidered banner). The festival has been held since 1967, and more than a thousand people participate in the parade, including nobles, ladies, soldiers, knights, jesters, flag bearers, and other characters. It is inspired by the ceremonies organized in 1225 by Frederick II to honor the arrival of his wife Isabella II of Jerusalem, whom he had married by proxy, and his father-in-law John of Brienne, King of Jerusalem. To prepare for the event and the beginning of the construction of the castle that stands today in the upper part of the city, Frederick settled in Oria with his court and ordered a tournament to be held between the four quarters of the city. The medieval parade of Oria is one of the most important and historically faithful medieval reenactments in Italy, having inspired most of the medieval festivals that appeared afterward.

=== Pizzica Scherma de Torrepaduli ===
Also known as Danza delle Spade ("Sword Dance"), it is the highlight of the festivities of Saint Roch (Italian: San Rocco), the patron saint of Torrepaduli, a town in the commune of Ruffano. It is a dance that takes place on the night of August 15–16, in which pairs of men (or sometimes trios) simulate fencing duels or knife fights using their hands and arms, in a choreography rich in secret symbolisms that are only fully known by the practitioners. The performance takes place in the repetitive rhythm of tambourines played by musicians who gather in circles. The pizzica is a traditional Salentine dance and scherma means "master of arms" or "fencer".

=== La Sagra de la Pittula ===
The pittula is a typical Christmas sweet, with similarities to the Portuguese filhoses, made with yeast semolina dough that is fried in extra virgin olive oil. They usually have a rounded shape and contain cauliflower, peppers, turnips, codfish, black olives, anchovies, tomatoes, and tuna. The traditional ones have no filling and are sprinkled with honey and sugared anesini. It is a symbol of luck and birth. In Surano there is a party (sagra) of pitulla on December 23, where one can also enjoy another local specialty, the pucce (singular: puccia), a type of bread. Another attraction of the festivity is the focareddha, a Christmas bonfire five meters high that according to tradition is intended to warm the baby Jesus.

=== Ride of the Devotees ===
Also called Cavalcata di Sant'Oronzo, it is the highlight of the Sant'Oronzo patron saint's festivities in Ostuni and consists of a parade of festively caged horses and riders in red uniforms with embroidery and sequins, reminiscencing of bullfighting costumes. The parade has been held since 1657 and has had its present form since 1803.

=== Triumphal car of Sant'Oronzo ===
It is an evening procession in Turi that celebrates the martyrdom of Sant'Oronzo. It departs from the church built over the cave where according to legend the saint preached. The image of the saint is carried in a triumphal car pulled by six mules and 14.8 meters high, made of oak wood, and finely decorated by local cabinetmakers. The procession is preceded by a historical procession and flag-wavers.

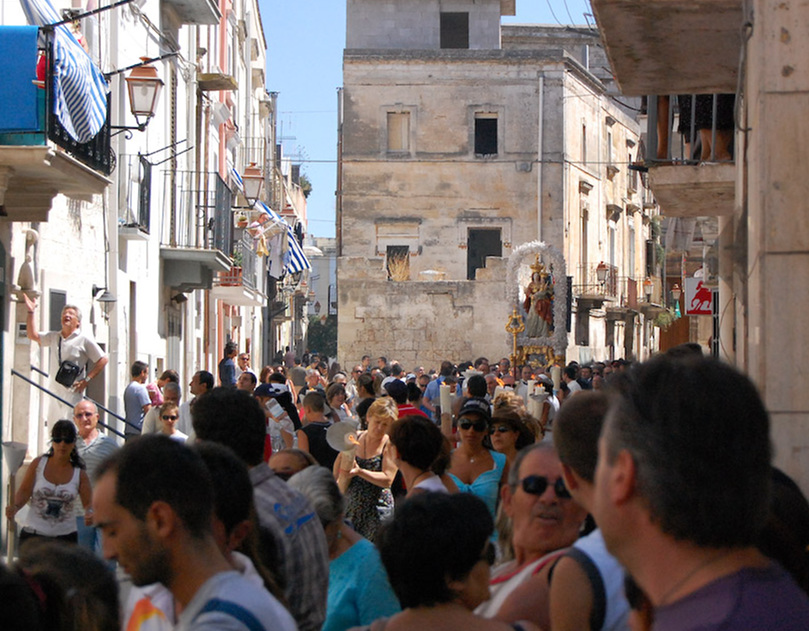
Procession of the Madonna del Pozzo in Capurso

=== Festa della Madonna del Pozzo ===
This festivity celebrates the miraculous discovery of a fresco of Madonna del Pozzo, the patron saint of Capurso, on August 30, 1705. The highlights are two processions, a daytime one with large candles, lasting about eight hours, and a nighttime one with a triumphal chariot, pulled by pilgrims from the town of Bisceglie.

=== Festa dei santi Medici ===
The highlight of this festival dedicated to the martyrs Saints Cosmas and Damian is a procession (known as the Intorciata) that runs through much of the historic center of Bitonto. The event probably has medieval origins, dating back to the 13th or 14th century, when the saints' relics (arms) arrived in Bitonto, although the first written mention of the presence of the relics in the city dates back to 1572. The festivity is attended not only by local faithful but also by those from other parts of Apulia and the neighboring regions, gathering more than 100,000 people, many of whom arrive in the town on foot (pilgrims). The procession lasts the entire day and begins with the departure of the images from the church, applauded by the crowd, and the release of balloons and pigeons. Some people make the procession walking backward, looking at the images of the saints. Others walk barefoot, carrying lit candles two meters high and 50 cm in diameter. There is a man who sings verses throughout the procession, accompanied by various groups. In the evening, the Nottata is celebrated, when the relics are displayed and there is a mass celebrated by the archbishop. During the festivity there is also a traditional fair: typical foods on this occasion are fecàzze (focaccia) and jàcce (celery). The saints' day, September 26, is also celebrated with hymns, songs, prayers and novenas. The main celebration in Bitonto was moved to mid/late October in 1733 to allow, among other things, the rural populations to complete all the activities connected with the wine cycle.

== Monuments and tourist attractions ==
=== Nature ===
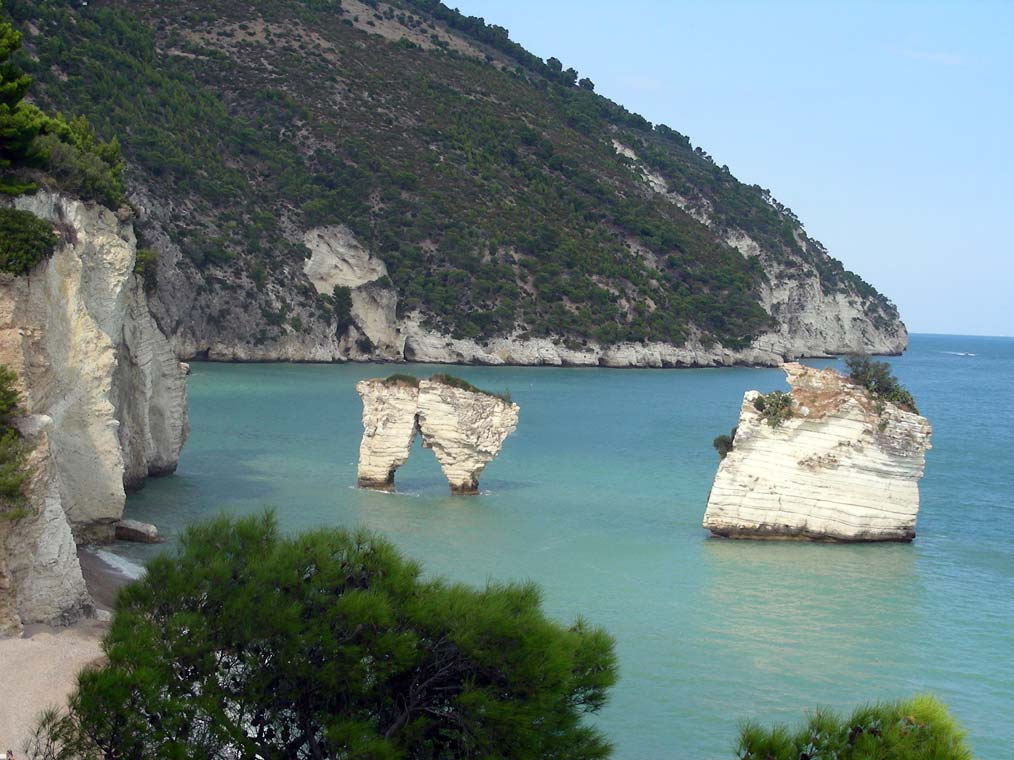
Bay delle Zagare, in the Gargano National Park

In Apulia, there are 2 national parks, 3 marine protected areas, 11 regional parks,17 state nature reserves and 7 regional nature reserves. In addition, 75 sites of community importance and 16 special protection areas have been proposed under the Natura 2000 project. The National Park of Gargano was created in 1991 and has 1,211.2 km^{2}. The Alta Murgia National Park was created in 2006, has 680.8 km^{2} and its headquarters is in Gravina in Puglia. Marine protected areas are Torre Guaceto (commune of Carovigno, province of Brindisi), the Tremiti Islands (north of Cape Gargano), and Porto Cesareo (province of Lecce).

Despite the presence of different biotopes, such as wetlands (mainly on the Adriatic side), caves (such as the Castellana caves), gorges, woods, etc., protected areas do not exceed 7% of the total area of the region. The wooded area occupies 7.5% of the territory, the lowest percentage in Italy.

=== Archeology ===
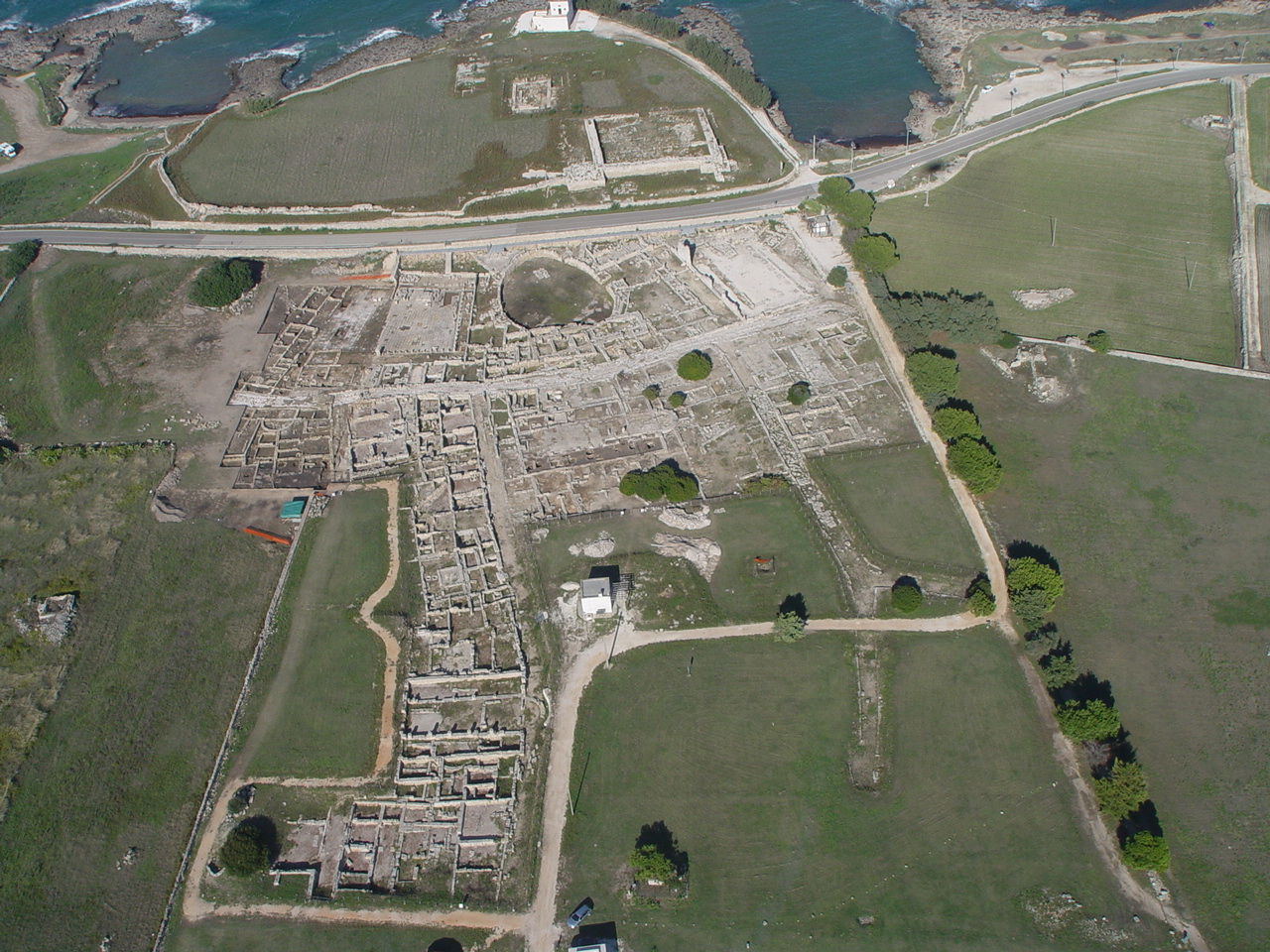
Aerial view of the ruins of Gnatia

Despite the great dispersion and destruction suffered by the archaeological heritage, which mainly affects Salento, in Apulia there are numerous archeological and paleontological sites, some with international importance, such as the quarry in Altamura discovered in 1999 that has about 30,000 dinosaur footprints, dating from 70 to 80 million years ago. It was also in Altamura that the so-called Man of Altamura, an archaic specimen of Homo neanderthalensis, was found. Other archaeological sites scattered throughout the region attest to human presence since the Stone Age. Among the largest are the ancient cities of Gnatia and Cannae, but there are also other settlements, various necropolises, dolmens, menhirs, Roman roads (such as the Appian Way and the Trajan Way), etc.

=== Religious architecture ===
The Apulian Romanesque, which reached its maximum splendor between the eleventh century and the first half of the thirteenth century, was the most immediate antecedent of the art that developed at the court of Frederick II in the thirteenth century, which, through the movement of artists such as Nicola Pisano of Apulia, led to the artistic renewal that then spread to Tuscany and thence to all Italy.

Among the first and most representative Romanesque buildings is the Basilica of Saint Nicholas (Basilica di San Nicola) in Bari, begun in 1087 and completed at the end of the 12th century. Other characteristic examples of Apulian Romanesque are the cathedrals of Trani, Troia, Ruvo di Puglia, Altamura, Bitonto, and the Basilica of Siponto in Manfredonia. Another building of notable historical importance is the mother church of Santa Maria della Porta in Palo del Colle, built in the 12th century and remodeled according to Renaissance canons in 1500, which has a bell tower about 50 meters high.

In addition to the Romanesque monuments, there are also notable Gothic buildings: the Anjou Cathedral in Lucera, the Sanctuary of Saint Francis Antonio Fasani (Basilica Santuario di San Francesco Antonio Fasanni) in the same city, the Basilica of Saint Francis of Assisi (Basilica di San Francesco d'Assisi) in Bitonto, the Basilica of Saint Catherine of Alexandria in Galatina, and the Basilica of the Holy Sepulchre in Barletta (Basilica del Santo Sepolcro).

Between the end of the 16th century, at the time of the Counter-Reformation, and the first half of the 18th century, the Baroque of Lecce was widespread. This artistic current spread throughout Salento, favored not only by the historical context, but also by the quality of the local stone used, pietra leccese, a soft and compact limestone with warm golden tones, suitable to be worked with a chisel. The Baroque of Lecce is characterized by its very exuberant decorations on the coverings of the buildings. Initially, this style was only used in religious and noble buildings, such as the Basilica of Santa Croce, in Lecce, the Palace of the Celestines (Palazzo dei Celestini), also in Lecce, and the Basilica of Santa Agata (Basilica Cattedrale di Sant'Agata) in Gallipoli. Later, Baroque exuberances, floral motifs, figures, mythological animals, friezes, and coats of arms also came into use in private architecture. Baroque architecture is luxuriant in Lecce and all the communes of its province, especially in Grecìa Salentina and the centers of Salento, such as Gallipoli, Maglie, Nardò, Galatina, and Martina Franca.

There is another notable example of contemporary religious architecture in Apulia: the Sanctuary of Saint Pio of Pietrelcina in San Giovanni Rotondo, designed by Renzo Piano and completed in 2004.

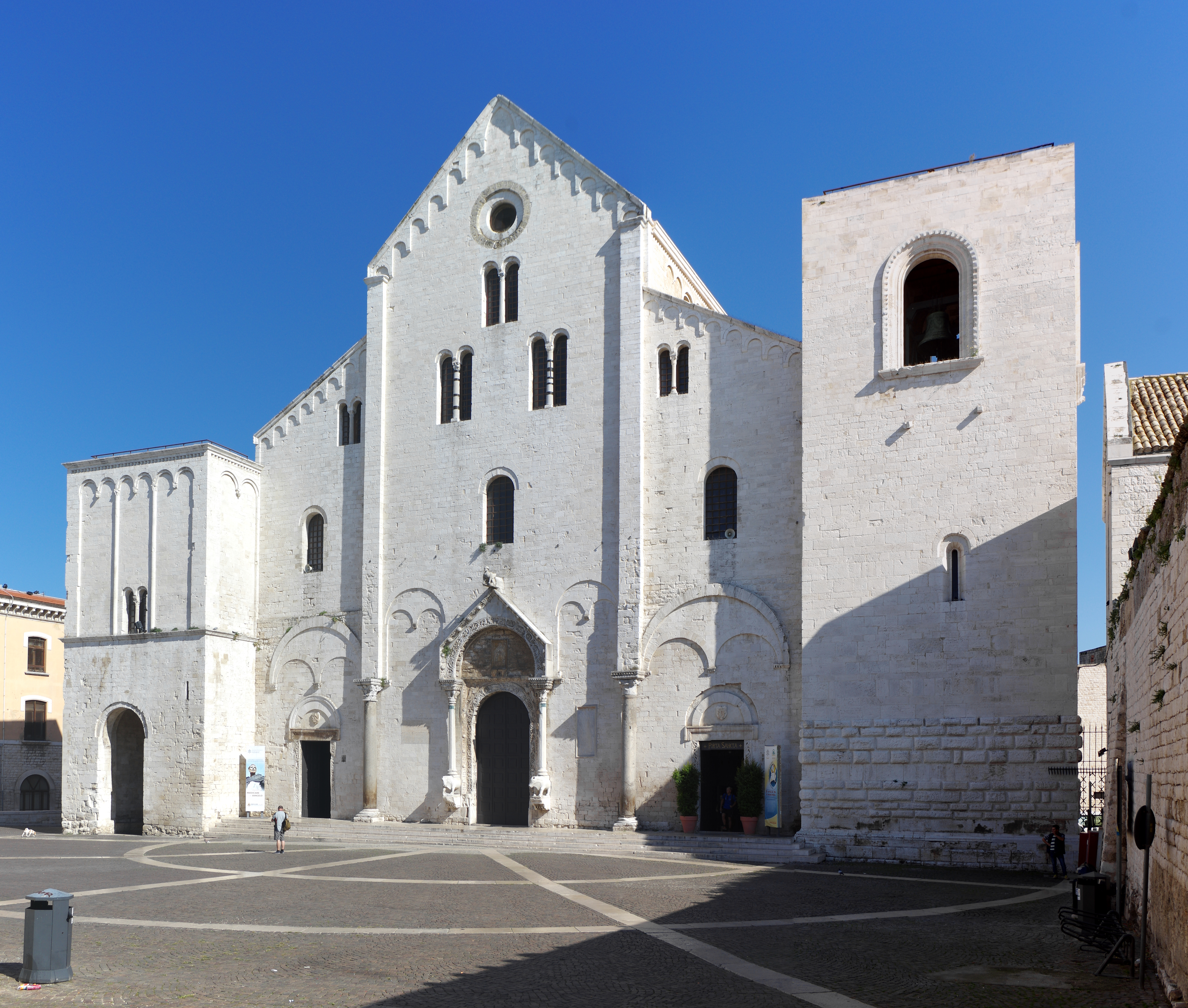
Western façade of the Basilica di San Nicola in Bari, an example of Apulian Romanesque

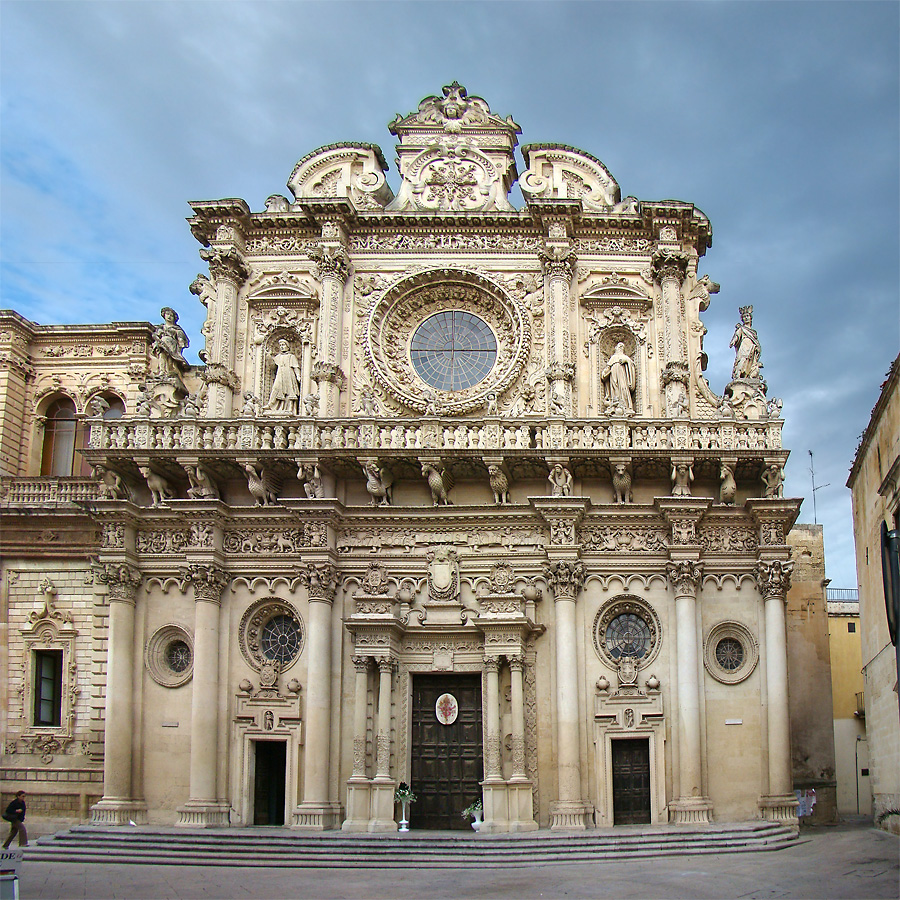
Basilica of Santa Croce, an example of the Lecce Baroque

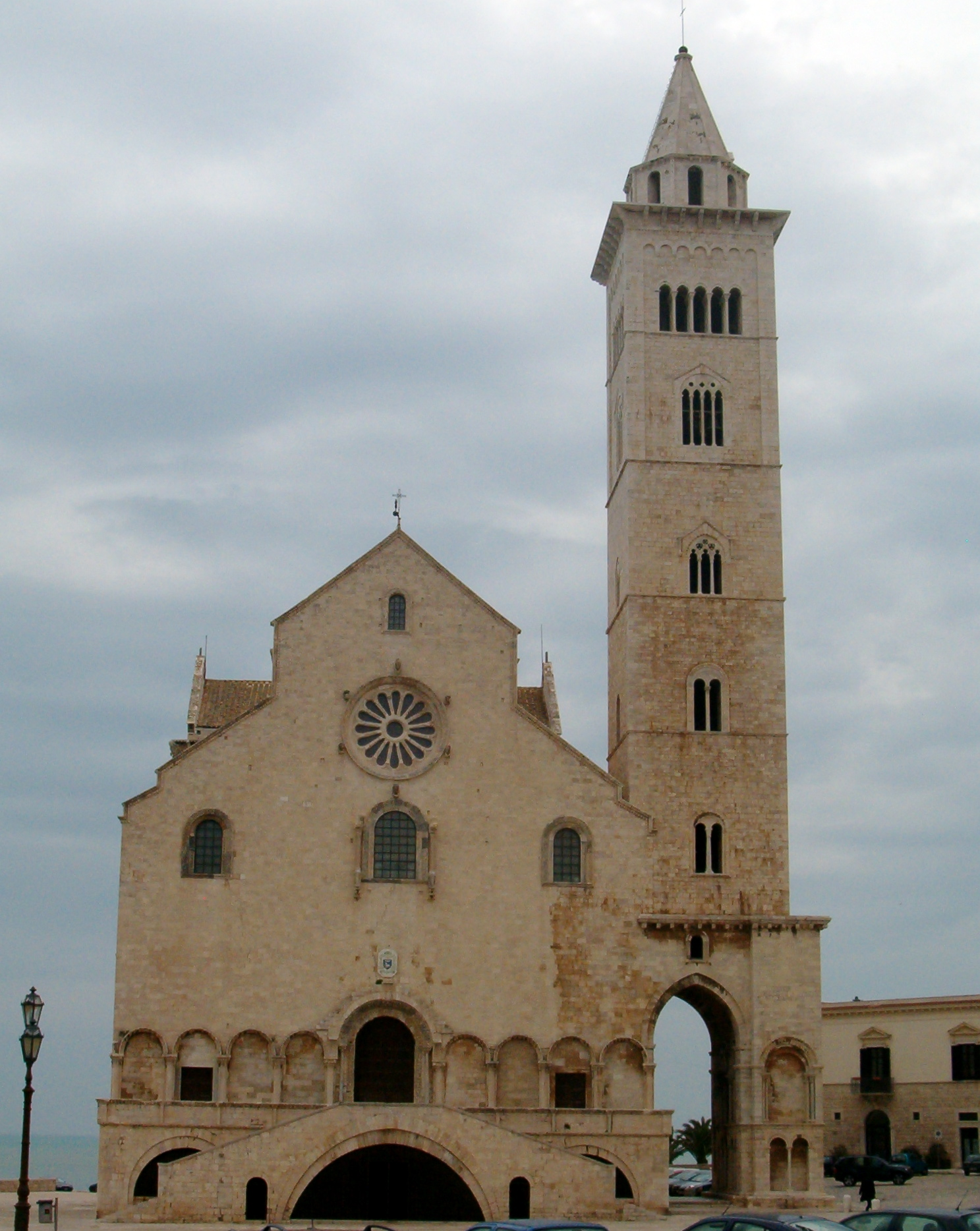
Trani Cathedral

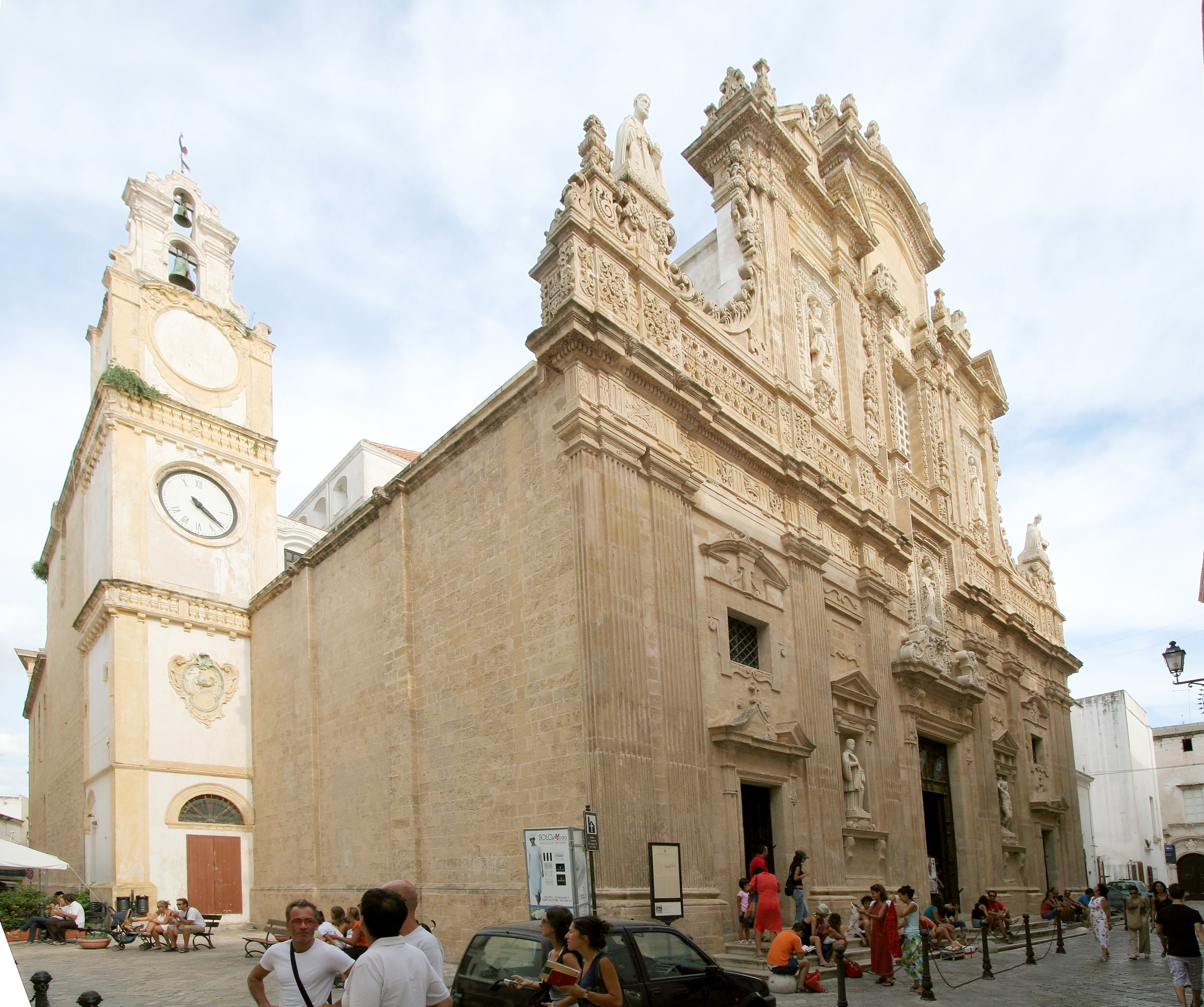
Gallipoli Cathedral

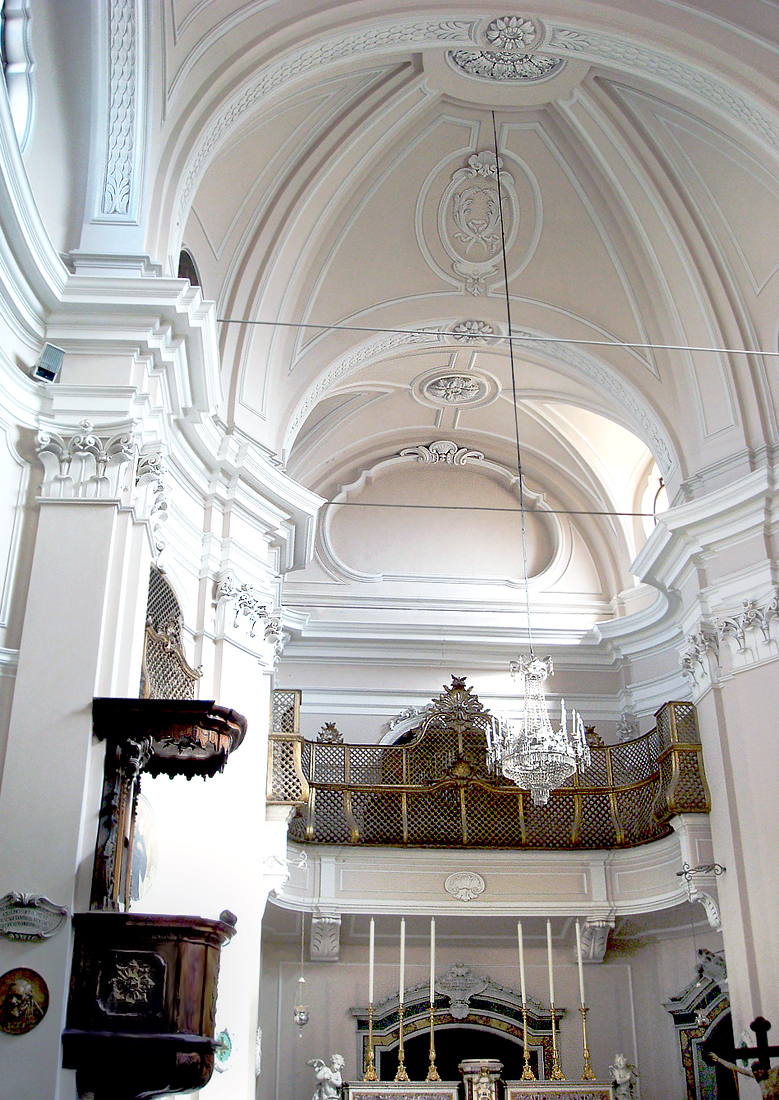
St. Lawrence Church of the Benedictines (Chiesa di San Lorenzo delle Benedettine) in San Severo

=== Military architecture ===
In Apulia, there are examples of various types of military architecture, such as anti-Saracen coastal towers, World War II bunkers, castles, and fortified towns (such as Acaya in the commune of Vernole). During the Late Middle Ages, several castles were built in Apulia, especially during the reign of Frederick II in the first half of the 13th century, who created a network of royal castles, of which the best known is Castel del Monte, listed as a World Heritage Site since 1996.

Castel del Monte is characterized by its unusual octagonal plan. More than a fortress itself, it is a rural palace, rich in symbolism, which is the source of many miraculous speculations. Other military constructions built or enlarged during the reign of Frederick II are the castles of Lucera, Bari, Trani, Barletta, Taranto, Oria, Brindisi, Lecce, Otranto, Gallipoli, and Manfredonia.

=== Typical architecture ===
There is a type of construction that is one of the symbols of Apulia: the trulli (singular: trullo), dwellings made of "dry stone" (without the use of any kind of mortar) with conical roofs covered with chiancarelle (limestone slabs). The conical dome is formed by stones in concentric circles, whose diameter decreases from bottom to top; the cone is closed by a stone of spherical shape, decorated with a pinnacle. The area with the highest concentration of trulli is the Itria Valley, namely Alberobello, in whose center there are only houses of this type, Ceglie Messapica, Cisternino, Locorotondo, and Martina Franca. Historical documents attest to the existence of trulli as the only type of housing unit in the area since the 16th century. The trulli of Alberobello was declared a World Heritage Site in 1996 due to representing an ancient building technique that has remained intact and perfectly functional.

In other parts of the region - and in particular in Salento - there are other "dry stone" buildings, called pajare (singular: pajara, pajaru, pagghiaru, truddrhu, pajarha or pahiaru), which, unlike the trulli, have the shape of a truncated cone, have no windows and are not plastered. These types of buildings may date back to the Bronze Age.

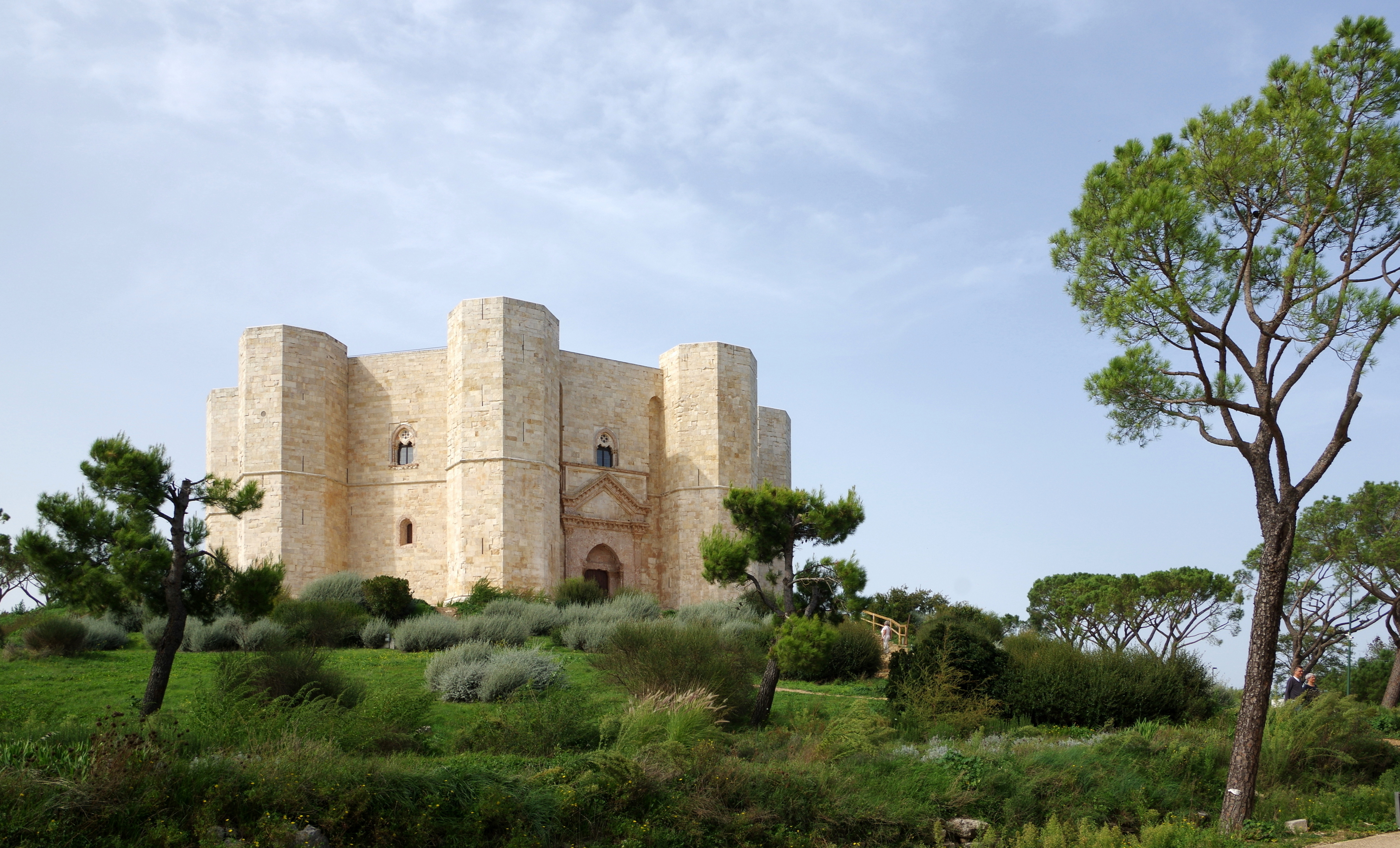
Castel del Monte in Andria

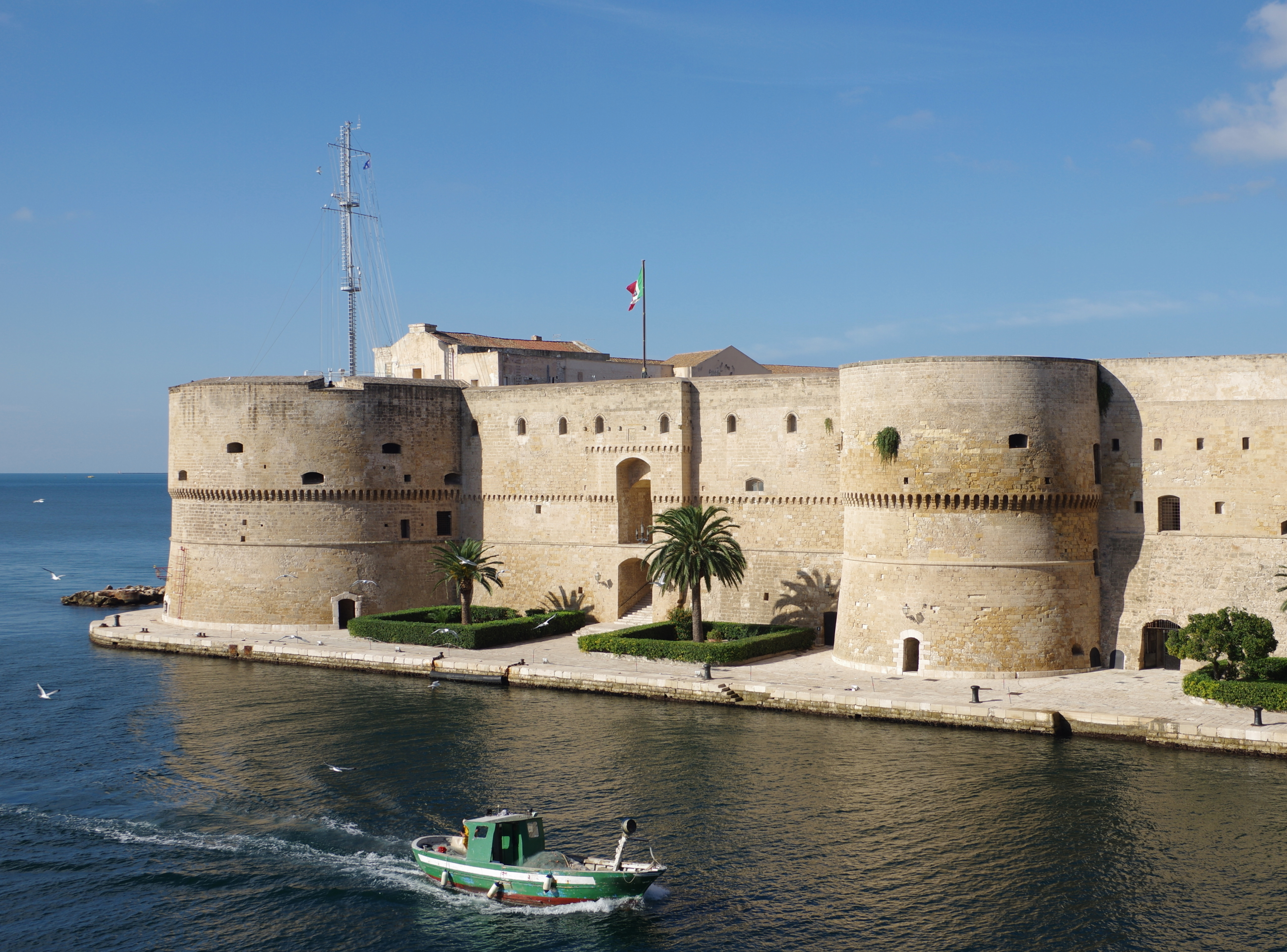
Aragonese Castle of Taranto

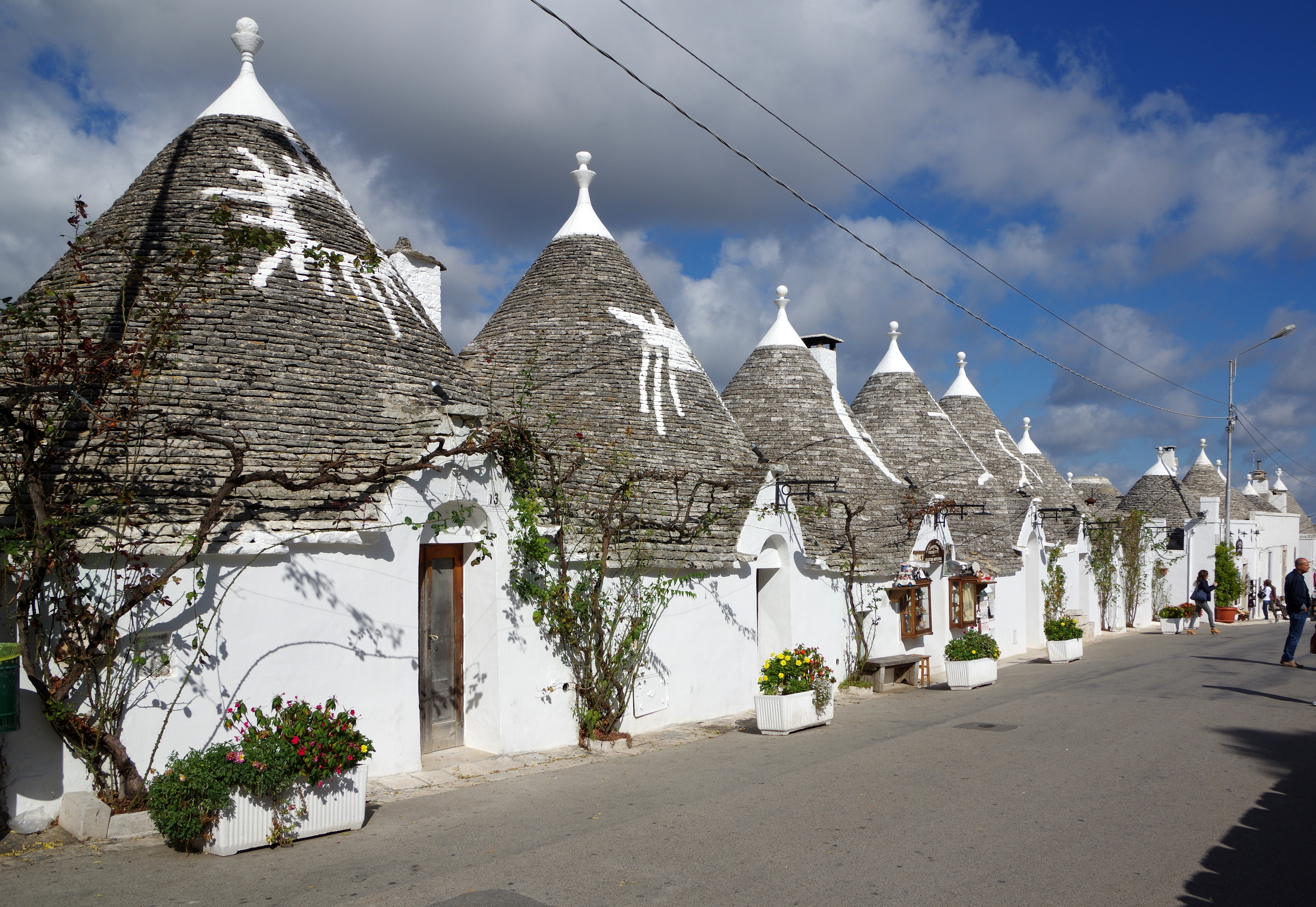
Trulli in Alberobello

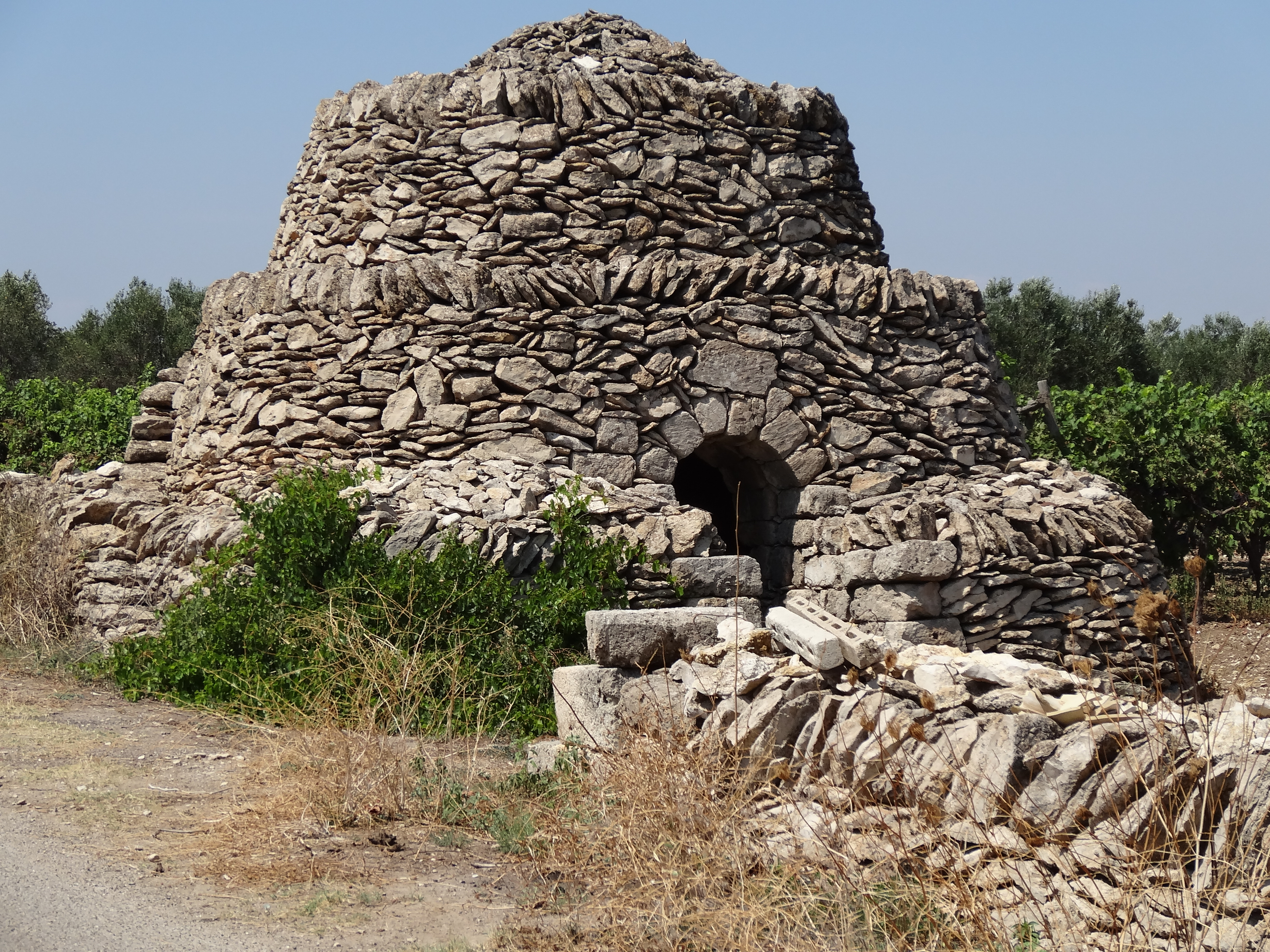
Pajara in Lizzano
