= List of municipalities of the Metropolitan City of Bari =

This is a list of the 41 municipalities (comuni) of the Metropolitan City of Bari in the region of Apulia in Italy.

== List ==
Municipality	Population (2026)	Area (km²)	Density
Acquaviva delle Fonti	19,680	132.03	149.1
Adelfia	16,371	29.81	549.2
Alberobello	10,029	40.82	245.7
Altamura	70,336	431.38	163.0
Bari	316,248	117.39	2,694.0
Binetto	2,184	17.65	123.7
Bitetto	11,745	33.95	345.9
Bitonto	52,868	174.34	303.2
Bitritto	11,456	17.98	637.2
Capurso	15,107	15.14	997.8
Casamassima	19,093	78.43	243.4
Cassano delle Murge	15,282	90.20	169.4
Castellana Grotte	19,702	69.13	285.0
Cellamare	5,761	5.91	974.8
Conversano	25,993	128.42	202.4
Corato	46,845	169.35	276.6
Gioia del Colle	26,433	208.94	126.5
Giovinazzo	19,087	44.30	430.9
Gravina In Puglia	41,990	384.74	109.1
Grumo Appula	11,956	81.30	147.1
Locorotondo	13,792	48.19	286.2
Modugno	35,993	32.24	1,116.4
Mola di Bari	24,095	50.94	473.0
Molfetta	57,016	58.97	966.9
Monopoli	47,657	157.89	301.8
Noci	18,095	150.60	120.2
Noicattaro	25,766	40.79	631.7
Palo del Colle	20,253	79.71	254.1
Poggiorsini	1,240	43.44	28.5
Polignano A Mare	17,271	63.09	273.8
Putignano	25,696	100.16	256.5
Rutigliano	18,254	53.85	339.0
Ruvo di Puglia	24,092	223.83	107.6
Sammichele di Bari	5,921	34.23	173.0
Sannicandro di Bari	9,608	56.79	169.2
Santeramo in Colle	25,578	144.86	176.6
Terlizzi	25,958	69.23	375.0
Toritto	7,953	75.35	105.5
Triggiano	25,558	20.11	1,270.9
Turi	12,972	71.40	181.7
Valenzano	17,139	15.98	1,072.5

== See also ==
- List of municipalities of Apulia
- List of municipalities of Italy
