= Province of Bari =

Former province of Apulia, Italy

Coordinates: 41°7′31″N 16°52′0″E

- Province (1860–2014)
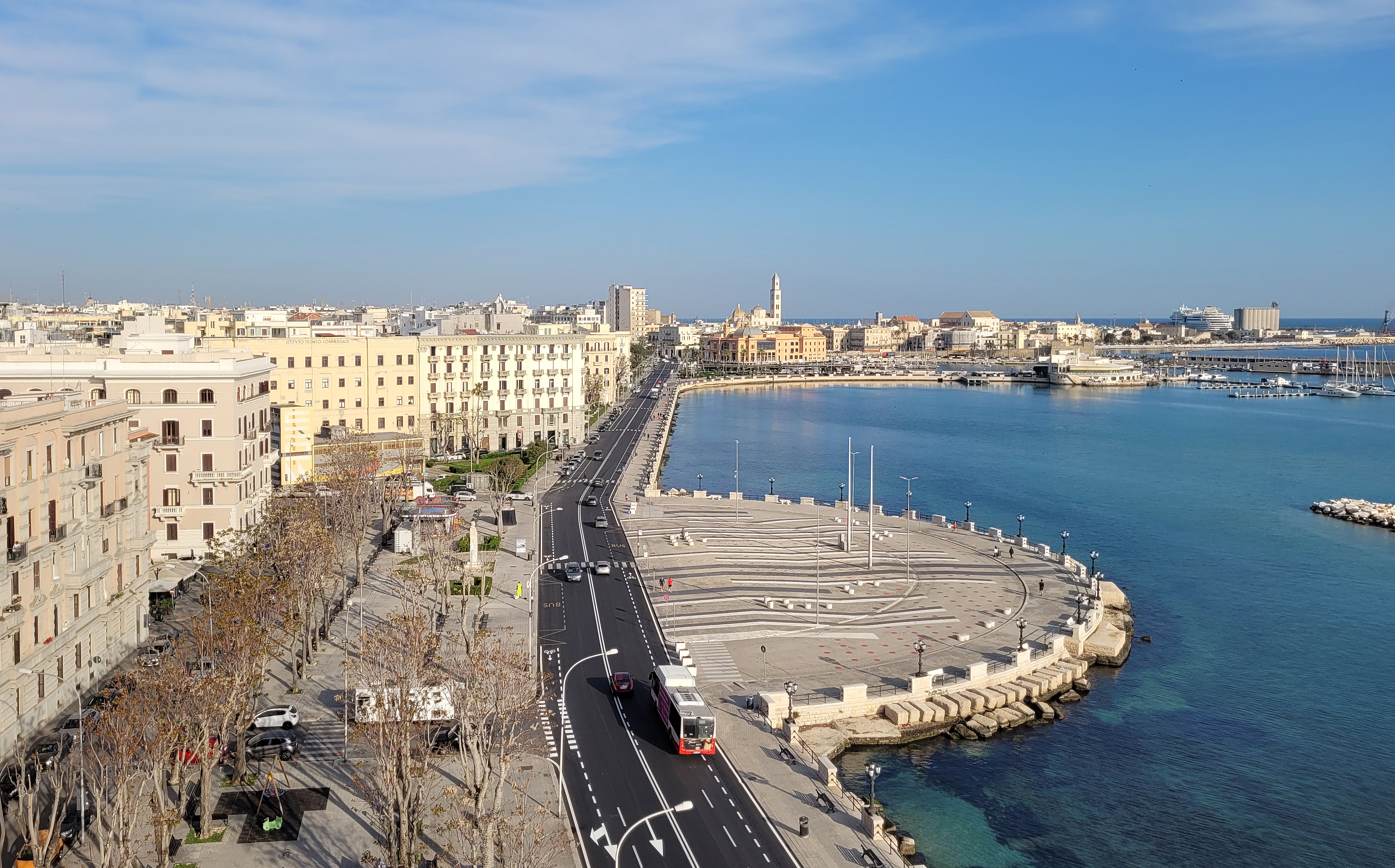
- View of Bari

- Flag Coat of arms

- Map highlighting the former province of Bari in Italy
- Country: Italy
- Region: Apulia
- Capital(s): Bari
- Comuni: 41

Area
  - Total: 5,138 km^{2} (1,984 sq mi)

Population (2013)
  - Total: 1,261,954
  - Density: 245.6/km^{2} (636.1/sq mi)
- Time zone: UTC+1 (CET)
  - Summer (DST): UTC+2 (CEST)
- Postal code: 70001–70100
- Telephone prefix: 080, 0883
- Vehicle registration: BA
- ISTAT: 072

The province of Bari (Italian: provincia di Bari; Neapolitan: pruvincia 'e Bari; Barese: provinge de Bare) was a province in the Apulia region of Italy. Its capital was the city of Bari.

It had an area of 5,138 km^{2} (1,984 sq mi), and a total population of 1,594,109 (2005). On 1 January 2015 it was replaced by the Metropolitan City of Bari.

== List of comuni ==
- Acquaviva delle Fonti
- Adelfia
- Alberobello
- Altamura
- Bari
- Binetto
- Bitetto
- Bitonto
- Bitritto
- Capurso
- Casamassima
- Cassano delle Murge
- Castellana Grotte
- Cellamare
- Conversano
- Corato
- Gioia del Colle
- Giovinazzo
- Gravina in Puglia
- Grumo Appula
- Locorotondo
- Modugno
- Mola di Bari
- Molfetta
- Monopoli
- Noci
- Noicattaro
- Palo del Colle
- Poggiorsini
- Polignano a Mare
- Putignano
- Rutigliano
- Ruvo di Puglia
- Sammichele di Bari
- Sannicandro di Bari
- Santeramo in Colle
- Terlizzi
- Toritto
- Triggiano
- Turi
- Valenzano
- Andria (to Barletta-Andria-Trani in 2009)
- Barletta (to Barletta-Andria-Trani in 2009)
- Bisceglie (to Barletta-Andria-Trani in 2009)
- Canosa di Puglia (to Barletta-Andria-Trani in 2009)
- Minervino Murge (to Barletta-Andria-Trani in 2009)
- Spinazzola (to Barletta-Andria-Trani in 2009)
- Trani (to Barletta-Andria-Trani in 2009)

== Economy ==
The arable land in the former province of Bari is exploited with the cultivation of olive and grapes but also cherries, peaches, and almonds. From that agricultural activity is derived olive oil, wine and table grapes. Bitonto is especially noted for its extra virgin olive oil, Corato, with its own autochthonous variety "Coratina", and Giovinazzo are along notable producing areas. The centers of wine production are mainly concentrated in Gravina and Ruvo di Puglia, in the north of Bari, and Adelfia, Noicattaro, Rutigliano and Locorotondo, in the south of Bari. Also important is the production of cherries; the Apulian red is especially prevalent in the countryside of Turi and Putignano.

== See also ==
- Metropolitan City of Bari
