= Ruvo di Puglia =

Ruvo di Puglia Riuve (Ruvestine dialect) Rhyba(Griko)
- Comune
- City of Ruvo of Apulia
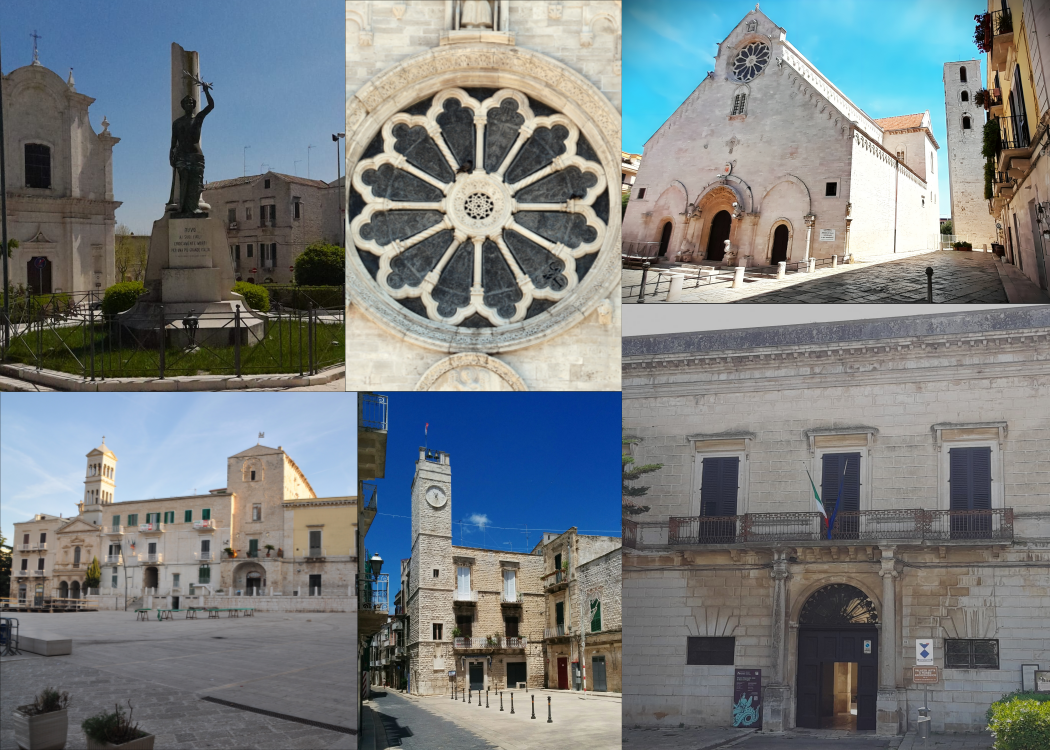
- Some of the Ruvo's monuments

- Flag Coat of arms
- Motto(s): Ruvo died to relive, like the Phoenix of Helipolis, from its ashes
- Location within Italy Location within Apulia
- Coordinates: 41°07′N 16°29′E
- Country: Italy
- Region: Apulia
- Metropolitan city: Bari (BA)
- Frazioni: Calendano

Government
  - Mayor: Pasquale Roberto Chieco (Democratic Party)

Area
  - Total: 221 km^{2} (85 sq mi)
- Elevation: 240 m (790 ft)

Population (2022)
  - Total: 25 341
  - Density: 0.11/km^{2} (0.29/sq mi)
- Demonym: Ruvesi (Italian) Ruvestines
- Time zone: UTC+1 (CET)
  - Summer (DST): UTC+2 (CEST)
- Postal code: 70037
- Dialing code: 080
- Patron saint: Saint Blaise
- Saint day: February 3
- Website: Official Municipality Website of Ruvo: News Website 1; News Website 2; News Website 3

Ruvo di Puglia (Italian: [ˈruːvo di ˈpuʎʎa]; Ruvestine: Rìuve [ˈriːuvə]) is a city and comune (municipality) of 25,457 inhabitants (as of 2017) in the Metropolitan City of Bari in Apulia.

It is an art city of Apulia, and an Apulian tourist destination. Part of the Alta Murgia national park, which contains its own operational office, it is home to the Jatta National Archaeological Museum, known for its many Hellenistic period pieces including the Vase of Talos, a community symbol. It is also home to the Municipal Art Gallery of Contemporary Art, named after Domenico Cantatore, a ruvestine expressionist and cubist painter. His artwork is kept there. Additionally, the city houses the Book Museum at Palazzo Caputi, where volumes of medieval and renaissance poetry originates from. It is also the third largest municipality in the Metropolitan City of Bari. It is an olive oil and wine producer city, and an important industrial research center of the Apulian region.

== Physical Geography ==
=== Territory ===
The countryside of Ruvo with its vineyards, olive groves, and arable land is one of the largest in the Land of Bari. It fell within the production areas of the Altamura Lentil which obtained the Protected Geographical Indication (PGI) in 2017. The territory has an area of 222.04 km^{2} and borders to the north with the Bisceglie comune, to the north-east with the Terlizzi comune, to the east with the Bitonto comune, to the south-east with the Altamura comune, to the south with the Gravina in Puglia commune, to the south-west with the Spinazzola and Andria comunes, and to the west with the Corato comune. The territory, not only that included in the Alta Murgia National Park, has the typical characteristics of an Apulian karst landscape: sinkholes, karst valleys, among which the upper course of the Lama Balice (otherwise known as the Tiflis stream) is remembered, as well as caves, including the Grave della Ferratella, which is the deepest in the region, and the Abisso di Notarvincenzo. The surface drainage is largely directed to the Adriatic Sea, but there are extensive endorheic areas, among which the largest are that of Calentano, drained by karst sinkholes, and that of the Pantano, adjacent to the inhabited center and drained by an artificial tunnel designed in the early 1900s. The countryside is also characterized by two large tectonic valleys, where there are modest amounts of non-karst soils, which contain large amounts of clay, sand, and pebbles. The valleys are home to surface water strata, which have been exploited since ancient times with wells that are partly still usable, which favors nearby ancient settlements.

=== Flora and fauna ===
The Adriatic side has a wooded scrub, covering 1100 hectares, including numerous oak trees, typical of the area, while in the hinterland the greater exposure to the winds has created a selective vegetation characterized by shrubs and brambles. In the countryside, 1500 plant species have been identified, among which the Austroitalic stipa stands out. In the pastures there are endemic species such as wild orchids and herbaceous layers characterized by ferules, asphodels and grasses. Typical of the area, among the spontaneous vegetation, is undoubtedly the cardoncello mushroom while in the woods, in addition to Downy Oaks, fragni, holm oaks, Turkey oaks and farnetti prevail. In the undergrowth there are species of gigari and peony mascula.

The habitat of the Alta Murgia does not offer specimens of large animals but can include the presence of foxes, wild boars, hares, hedgehogs and vipers. However, the existence of numerous species of insects and birds is of particular interest. Typical of the area are the calandrelle, the larks, the cappellacce and the tottaville. The group of birds of prey is also quite numerous among which there are sparrow hawks, red kites, brown kites, bianconi, lanari and an important population of lesser kestrels. The karst environments are instead characterized by specimens of Italian crested newt, toad, tree frog and edible frog while the dry and stony aspect of the Murgia favors the existence of reptiles such as the Kotschy gecko and the Leopard Snake.

=== Climate ===
The city is subject to a Mediterranean climate (or, according to the Köppen classification), characterized by dry and muggy summers and mild and rainy winters. Snowfalls are infrequent, a little more likely in February, but snow nevertheless appears at least twice a year and also generally can accumulate for a couple of days, but not exceeding 20 centimeters (8 in). Although episodes with significant accumulation are not uncommon, without even bothering historical events such as the 50 cm (1'6 ft) of January 2–3, 1993. Every winter there are days with low temperatures close to 0 °C (32 °F), due to currents coming from the Scandinavian, Balkan or Russia areas, as well as the extensive nighttime frost in the countryside. Episodes of evening-night fog in late autumn and early winter are also not rare. The summer period, on the other hand, is affected by the influence of the North African winds which determine long periods of heat and sirocco.

The highest peaks in temperature were reached in June 2007 with around 42 °C (107 °F) and in July of the same year it reached 43 °C (109 °F). Often the extremely sultry summers led to long periods of drought, among which we remember those of 1908 and 1914 or, more recently, of 1980.

== History ==
=== Name ===
The name of the site is first attested on a series of coins of the 3rd century BCE, which bear legends in Greek characters: ΡΥΨ (Rhyps), ΡΥΒΑ (Rhyba), and ΡΥΒΑΣΤΕΙΝΩΝ (Rhybasteinon). In the 1st century BCE, the poet Horace referred to the inhabitants as the Rubi, and in the 1st century CE they appear in Pliny the Elder's list of the peoples of Apulia as the Rubustini. The name remained Rubi throughout the Middle Ages.

=== Prehistory, the arrival of the Greeks and the Roman age ===
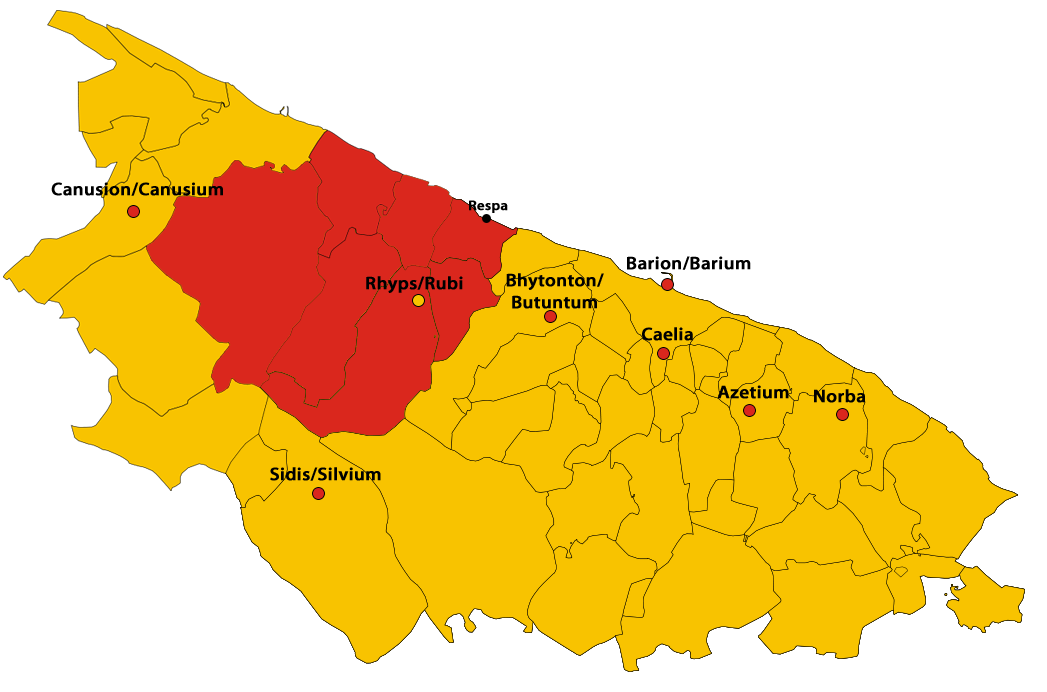
Ruvo's territory in the 3rd century BC

Some artefacts of worked stone date the first settlements in the Ruvestine countryside to the Middle Palaeolithic while some remains of villages confirm the presence of man since the 6th millennium BC. However, during the Bronze Age the territory was inhabited by the Morgetes, a people Ausonic, then expelled by the Iapygians with the advent of the Iron Age. The Iapygians settled in the land of Bari giving rise to the Peucetians lineage and Ruvo was initially founded as a hilltop village currently located between the municipal pine forest and the church of San Michele Arcangelo. The countryside around Ruvo in the Peucetian age was very vast and also had a port, called Respa, near Molfetta.

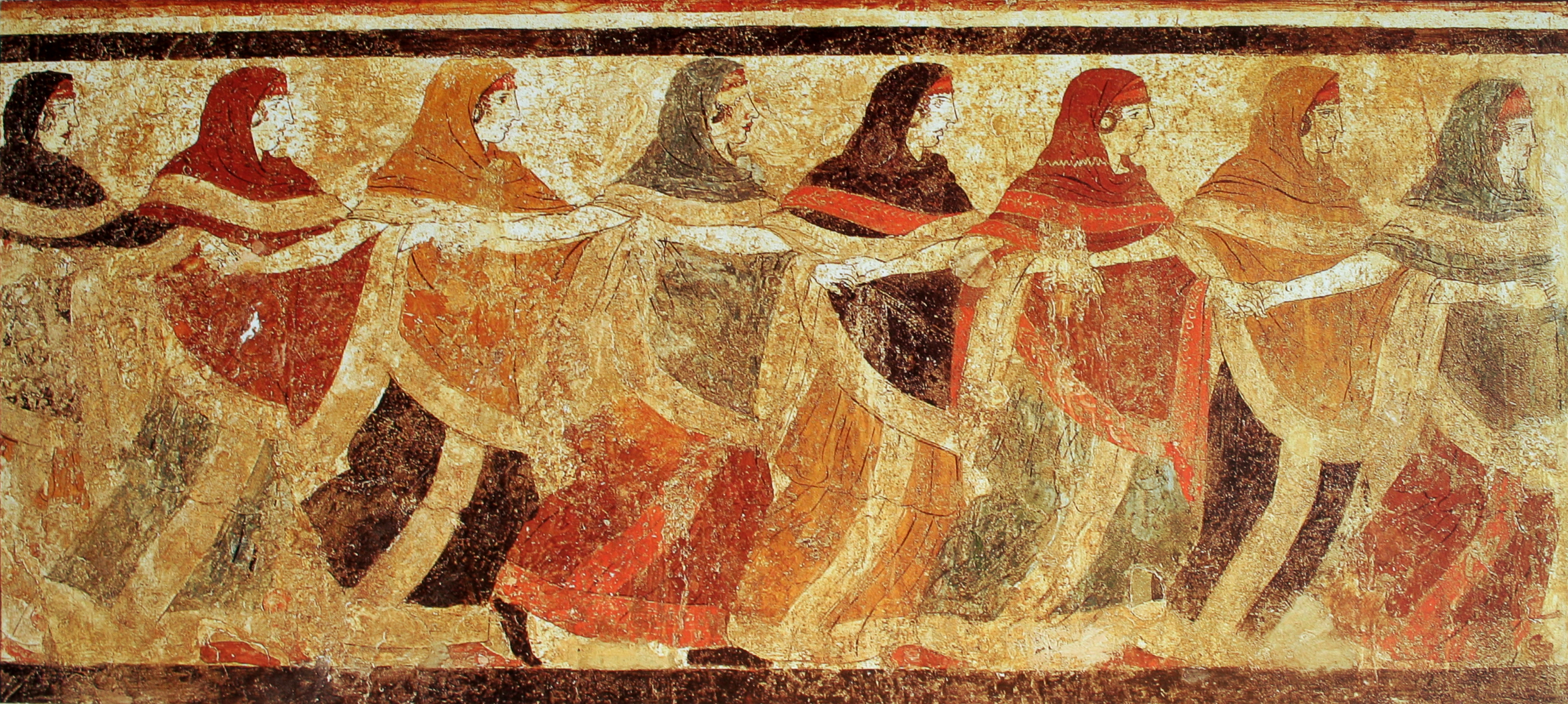
Fresco of dancing Peucetian women in the Tomb of the Dancers, fourth or fifth century BC

Between the 8th and 5th centuries BC the Greeks peacefully colonized Ruvo which from that moment took the name of "Ρυψ". Around the 4th century BC the village experienced its moment of greatest splendor by conducting commercial exchanges with most of the Italic populations, including the Etruscans, minting its own currency and boasting a population and a territory never reached again (Ruvo's polis (City-State) of the Greek age included Molfetta, Terlizzi, Corato, Trani and Bisceglie). Ruvo established itself as a thriving polis of Magna Graecia and its wealth consisted in the trade of olive oil and wine and in the flourishing production of pottery. The Greek city of Ruvo ended up becoming protected by Athens, as shown by some coins, but also an ally of Taranto.

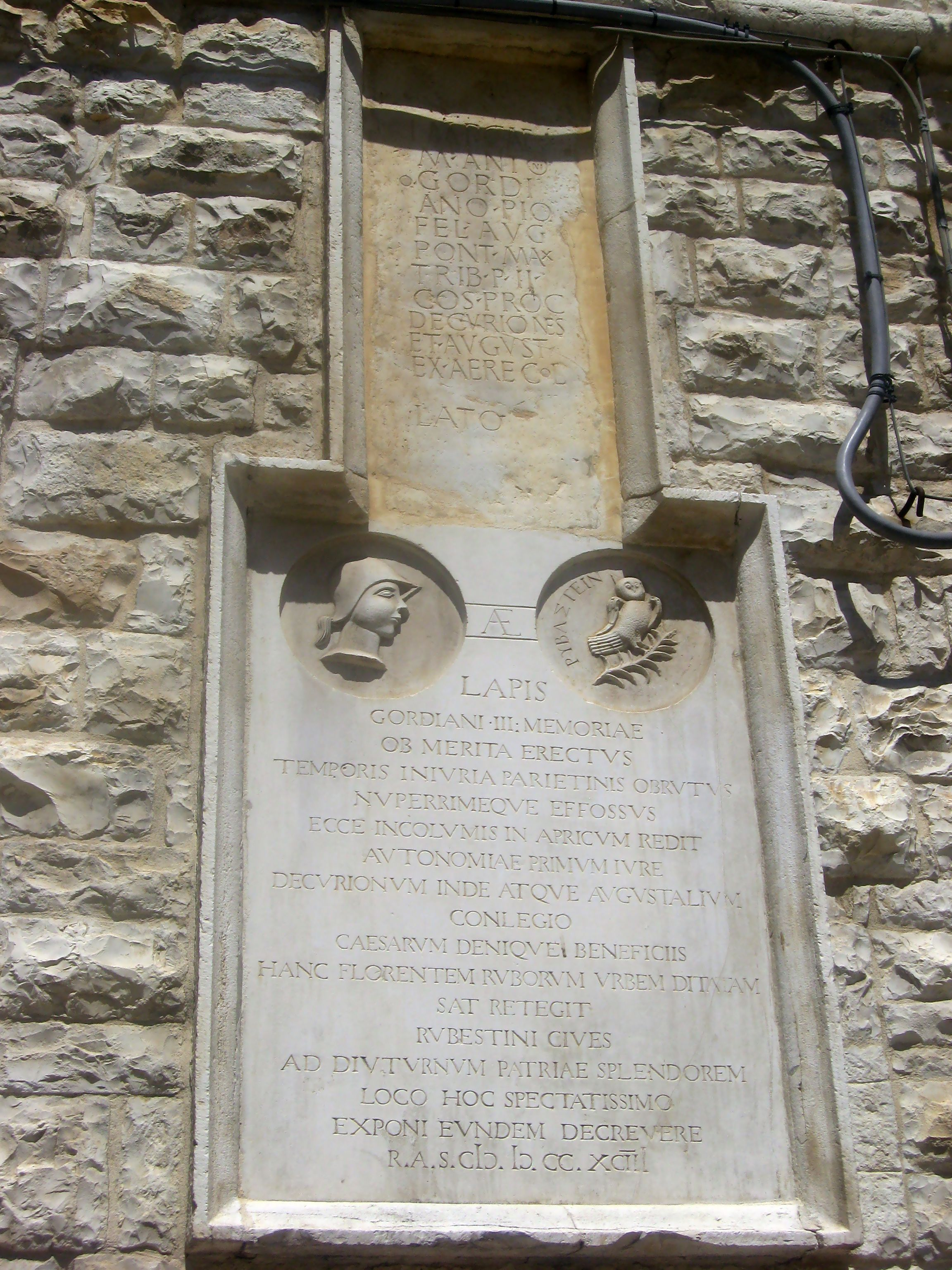
Epigraph to Gordian III

The defeat of the Greek Taranto in the war against Rome marked the end of the Hellenistic age in Apulia, thus making Ruvo enter the orbit of Romanization with the name of Rubi. Later Ruvo played a fundamental role for the Roman Republic and for the Empire, first being assigned the Roman citizenship, then the title of municipium and finally becoming the station of the Via Traiana. In 44, according to legend, Ruvo saw the rise of its own diocese at the behest of St. Peter, who appointed St. Cletus as the first bishop, who in the future would become pope. However, in the imperial age the ruvestine territory underwent a decrease as Molfetta, Trani and Bisceglie rise, thus losing contact with the sea.

=== Medieval Ruvo ===
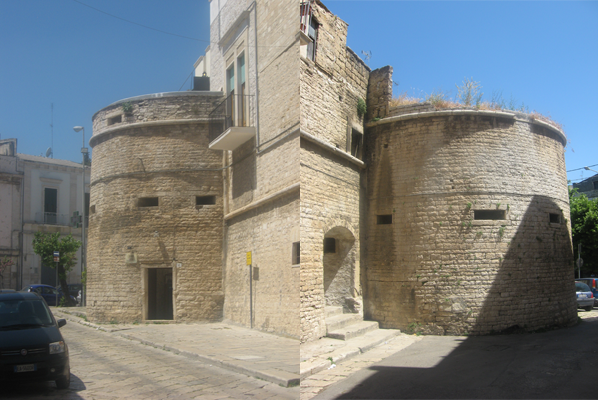
The last two remaining towers of the medieval walls of Ruvo near via Veneto

In the fifth century the flourishing Ruvo disappeared under the blows of the invasions of the Goths which reduced the city to a pile of rubble for the first time. Ruvo, refounded on the slopes of the original hill, was first conquered by the Lombards and then fell prey to the Saracens. It was in this period that the ruvestines decided to equip themselves with a wall with towers and four doors: Porta Noè (now via Veneto), Porta del Buccettolo (via Campanella), Porta del Castello (piazza Matteotti) and Porta Nuova (corso Piave). In the 11th century the fortress of Ruvo entered the county of Conversano and suffered further violence due to internal struggles for the management of power, which conflicts led to the second destruction of the town. However, it was under Frederick II of Swabia that Ruvo finally recognized a cultural and economic growth, a period marked by the construction of the Romanesque-Gothic cathedral and in the territory between Ruvo and Canosa of Castel del Monte. However, the foundations of the cities of Corato and Andria also date back to this historical moment, whose territories further diminished the ruvestine territory.

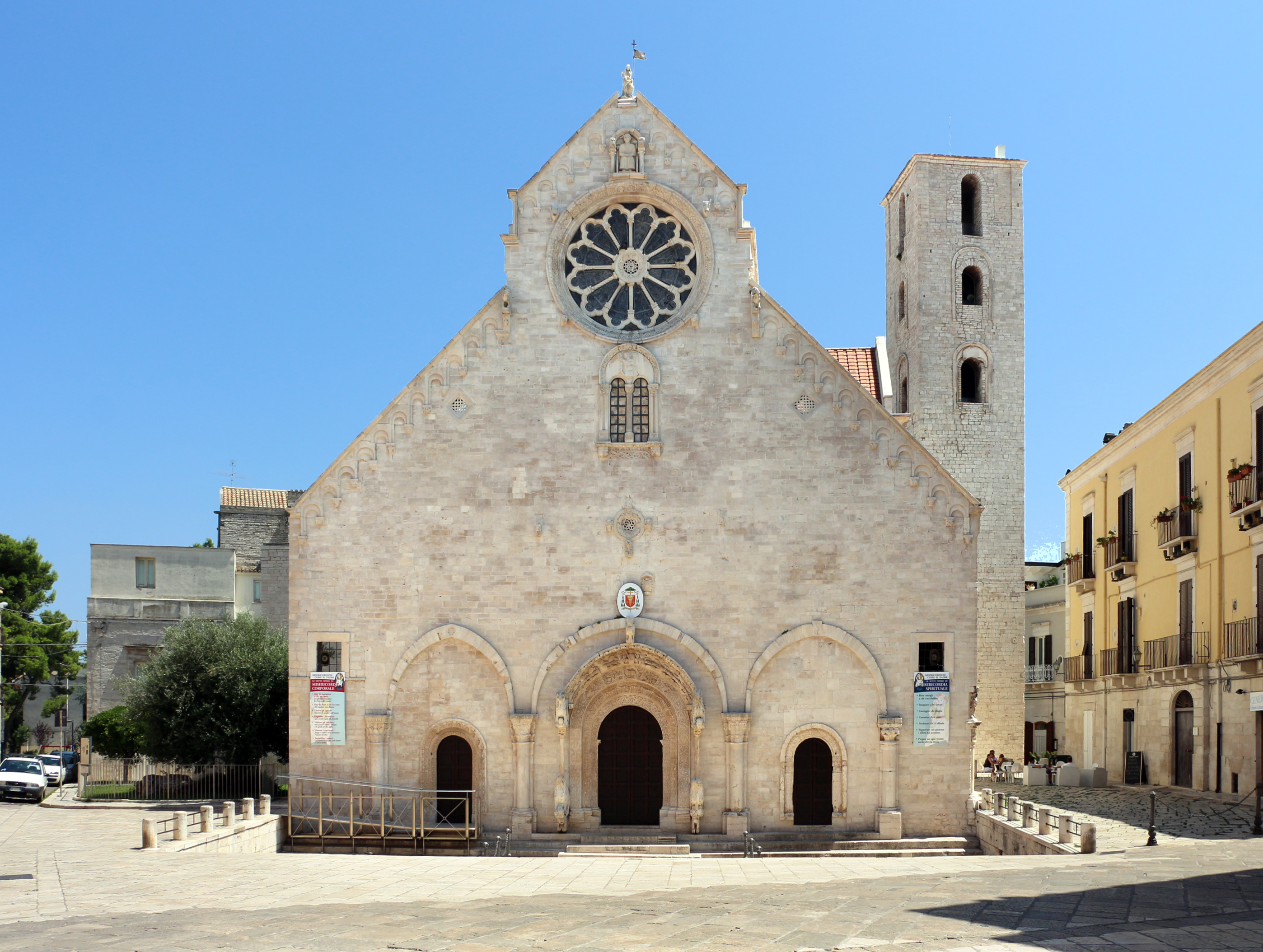
The medieval Ruvo Cathedral

From 1266 Ruvo became a fief and entered, together with the whole of Apulia, among the dominions of the Angevins. Despite this, the Ruvo fiefdom saw the period of peace and prosperity it was going through fade once again since in 1350 the city was razed to the ground and sacked by Ruggiero Sanseverino. The ruvestines were thus forced to rebuild the inhabited center, the walls and also decided to build the Torre del Pilota (Pilota Tower) 33 meters high (108 ft). The Crown of Aragon dominion succeeded the Angevin dominion.The clashes for domination over the Kingdom of Naples between France and Spain resulted in the famous Battle of Ruvo, which saw the victors of the Spaniards led by Consalvo of Cordova against the French troops of Jacques de La Palice stationed in Ruvo. During this battle the city was razed to the ground for the third time. The same fief also saw the thirteen French who clashed against as many Italians in the Challenge of Barletta starting from its wall.

=== The Carafa: Counts of Ruvo ===
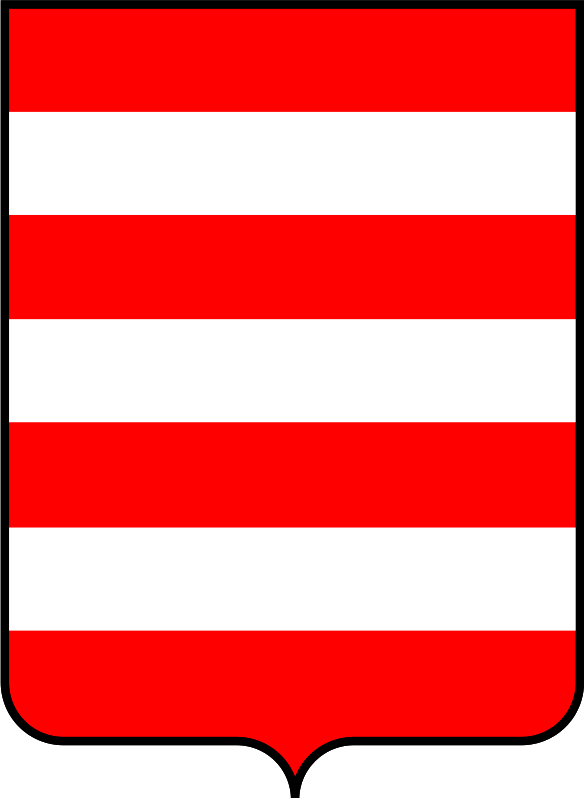
Coat-of-arms of House of Carafa of Counts of Ruvo

In 1510 Oliviero Carafa bought the fief of Ruvo and the city itself experienced a negative historical period. Most of the historic ruvestines patrician families became extinct and only in the seventeenth century new noble families arose that knew a particular and flourishing economic condition. The walls were further strengthened but despite the long period of peace the population was suffocated by the oppression of the Carafa and by the tyrannical government of the same who transformed the Pilota Tower from a defense tool to a prison for the opponents.

Between the end of the sixteenth and seventeenth centuries, or in the era of the counter-reformation, Ruvo saw the birth of various associations and congregations still operating today especially in the care of the rites of the Ruvestine Holy Week. However, in this dark period of Ruvo's history some illustrious men stood out among which the most famous is undoubtedly the doctor Domenico Cotugno. In 1806, under the Napoleonic rule, feudalism was abolished, thus concluding the dominion of the Carafa which lasted three centuries. Among the Carafa family of the Counts of Ruvo we note the hero of the Neapolitan Republic of 1799, Ettore Carafa.

=== From the Unification of Italy to the present day ===
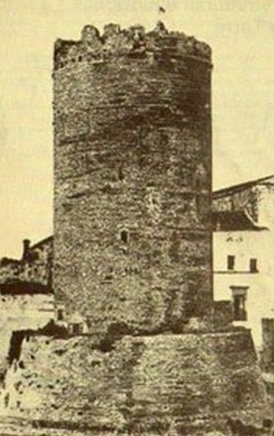
Pilota Tower as a Telegraphic Office in 1880s

After the dominion of the Carafa, the liberal uprisings also touched Ruvo but failed miserably as in the rest of the South. However, in the early nineteenth century Giovanni Jatta was particularly distinguished, who was elected by the ruvestines as the city's lawyer, won the case against the Carafa family, obtaining lavish compensation and was among the protagonists of those archaeological excavations that brought to light the numerous finds of Peucet, Greek and Roman period preserved in the Jatta museum. In the period prior to the unification of Italy, Ruvo was the seat of a Carbonara sale called "Perfetta Fedeltà" which included the patriot and lawyer Francesco Rubini who was responsible for organizing the Risorgimento uprisings also in Ruvo. In the post-unification period Ruvo, albeit slowly, knew the signs of progress also thanks to the ruvestine deputy and agronomist Antonio Jatta, who pointed out to the government the numerous problems of Apulia and the province of Bari. Fundamental milestones of progress were marked in 1905 from the arrival of electric lighting and in 1914 with the diffusion of public water. During the First World War 367 ruvestines fell on the battle fronts while in the fascist twenty years other works of public benefit were carried out such as the reclamation of the quagmire and the creation of the sewer in 1938 of which still today we can distinguish some Fascist manhole covers with the Fascist coat of arms alongside the coat of arms of the municipality of Ruvo di Puglia. After the Second World War Ruvo distinguished itself in the cultural sphere, above all thanks to the works of the painter Domenico Cantatore, but also in the economic sphere with the flourishing vines and olive groves.

=== Symbols ===
Coat of arms of Ruvo di Puglia from 1950

There is very little information regarding the heraldry of the municipality of Ruvo di Puglia. To shed light on the origin of the coat of arms is Giovanni Jatta in his Historical mention of the Ancient City of Ruvo in the Peucetians times. The current coat of arms derives from the incorrect interpretation of the etymology of the toponym since it was believed that Ruvo derives from the expression "land abundant with brambles" and therefore the population called itself a vase full of brambles as a coat of arms. Over time, however, the coat of arms was simplified, giving life to the current one, that is a terracotta amphora on a blue background. In his historiography Jatta advised to replace the coat of arms inspired by the Greek coins found on which the ancient name of Ruvo was imprinted, or Ρυψ (Rhyps, to be read "Rüps"), as happened for the city of Taranto. However, this hypothesis has never been taken into consideration and now the terracotta amphora is inextricably linked to the name of Ruvo.

Banner of Ruvo di Puglia

Today's coat of arms was recognized through a decree of the President of the Republic on January 11, 1950, with the following blazon:

"Blue with terracotta amphora."

Even less is known about the gonfalon and the flag. The prevailing color is red, which probably recalls the red of the clayey earth and the glaze of the amphora. The banner is displayed in all public ceremonies and also during the processions of the patron saints and the Octave. It is made up of a red cloth bordered and decorated with golden embroidery on which the golden inscription Comune di Ruvo di Puglia stands out. The golden ornaments of the banner undoubtedly have mysterious origins since silver embroidery and inscriptions are provided for the municipalities.

The Ruvo di Puglia flag is rarely used, although displayed on the balconies of Piazza Giacomo Matteotti, seat of the town hall, during certain periods of the year or on the occasion of secular and national holidays. The flag is made of a red fabric lined with a floral pattern and edged with gold embroidery.

== Monuments and places of interest ==
=== Religious architectures ===
The churches of Ruvo di Puglia constitute the main nucleus of the town's artistic heritage. This is due to the existence, until 1982, of the Diocese of Ruvo, founded according to tradition by Peter the Apostle, who placed the future Pope Anacletus at the head of the local episcopate, then united with Bitonto at the end of the 19th century and finally merged into the diocese of Molfetta-Ruvo-Giovinazzo-Terlizzi

- Cathedral of Ruvo di Puglia. It is one of the best known examples of Apulian Romanesque and the temple was built in the first half of the 12th century with various subsequent modifications. The façade is gabled with three portals: the central one is enriched by bas-reliefs in the intrados and is divided into three arches; the two smaller and simpler side portals are identified by two half columns which provide the support for two pointed arches. The façade is adorned with various stone artefacts among which a large rose window with twelve columns variously worked and superimposed on a metal sheet worked very finely in the fretwork in a local workshop of the sixteenth century stands out. Above the rose window is the seat identified as Robert II of Bassavilla and at the top of the façade stands the statuette of Christ the Redeemer. The interior follows the Latin cross plan and is covered with a trussed roof and cross vaults. The central nave is the largest and rests on two rows of columns. The 11th century bell tower and the Bishop's Palace are also annexed to the cathedral.
- Church of San Domenico. It was built together with the convent on the ruins of the ancient monastery of Santa Caterina at the behest of the Dominicans (Order of Preachers) who arrived in Ruvo in the mid-sixteenth century, to be then completely rebuilt in 1743 under the title of San Domenico. The church, late Baroque, has a slender facade in which the large window in the upper order and the door surmounted by a tympanum on which the Piarist coat of arms is superimposed. The interior of the building enhances the space and the neoclassical altar, surmounted by the wooden statue of St. Dominic. In the temple there is the canvas of the Presentation in the temple of Jesus and Purification of Mary by Giuseppe Mastroleo.
- Church of San Michele Arcangelo. According to tradition, the church and the convent were built on the advice of St. Francis of Assisi, passing through Ruvo and later the Order of observant Friars Minor settled there. However the church collapsed in the 17th century and in 1775 the new structure was consecrated. The façade, in late Baroque style, is divided into three sections by the pilasters and has an architraved portal. The interior, in full Baroque style, has a Neapolitan altar and a long series of chapels. The two paintings by the Flemish painter Gaspar Hovic emerge from the church's grave goods. The cloister of the convent is frescoed with a cycle of episodes relating to the life of St. Francis.
- Church of the Most Holy Redeemer. Construction began in 1900 and only finished in 1955. The facade has a portico divided into arches as regards the lower order; on the upper order there are two niches and a central window. The façade culminates with the tympanum surmounted by the stone statue of Christ the Redeemer. The interior has a barrel vault that covers the single nave on the walls of which eight chapels and relative niches are arranged. The altar is enhanced by the brightness of the large mosaic that covers the apsidal basin representing The Church on its way to the Redeemer.
- Church of the Carmine. Originally dedicated to San Vito, the church was entrusted in 1614 to the Arciconfraternita del Carmine who restored it. However, today's appearance was only achieved thanks to the restoration and completion works completed in 1885. The large facade is rectangular and surmounted by a tympanum; the interior, consisting of a single nave, has a frescoed barrel vault and the simulacra that parade during the procession of the Mysteries on Good Friday are preserved in this temple.
- Sanctuary of Saints Cosmas and Damian. The original church was built in the Middle Ages and dedicated to Santa Maria di San Luca. However, due to the growing devotion to the saints Cosma and Damiano, starting from the 1920s, the temple was restored and dedicated to the saints Medici. The façade has a cusp while inside there is the simulacrum of the titular saints and two stone monuments, built in memory of two noble Rwanda families, namely the Mazzacane and the Caputi.
- Church of Saint Roch. The temple was built in 1503 as a sign of thanksgiving and devotion by the Rusvest people, following the liberation of Ruvo from the plague at the hands of Saint Roch. However, in 1645 the church was rebuilt. The exterior has a large ashlar facade with an architraved portal. Inside, the papier-mâché group of the Eight Saints is particularly revered, carried in procession on the night of Holy Thursday.
- Church of the Purgatory. The result of the union of two adjacent churches, the building took on its present appearance in the seventeenth century and stands on the ancient Roman cistern where the first Ruvest Christians gathered under the guidance of Saint Anacletus. The exterior has an ashlar facade culminating in a baroque bell tower. Inside you can admire, on the barrel vault, two cycles of frescoes depicting the life of Saint Anacletus and other saints.
- Capuchin Church. The sacred building was connected to the large convent of the Capuchin Friars and although it was first dedicated to Mary Magdalene and then to Santa Lucia and Santa Filomena, the church took its name from the Rufus people, or church of the Capuchins. The façade is large but humbly decorated only by white plaster while inside you can admire the large wooden crucifix placed behind the altar.
- Church of St. James al Corso. The temple dates back to the Middle Ages and belonged to a Jerusalem commendam. However the church was rebuilt in 1869 and also dedicated to the Immaculate Conception, as well as to St. James. The spire façade is neoclassical and inside there are numerous frescoes by the painter Mario Prayer.
- Sanctuary of Saint Mary of Calentano. The sacred building was built in the Late Middle Ages in the current hamlet of Calentano, 8 km from Ruvo and was probably a Templar refuge. Inside there are various Gothic and Greek epigraphs and traces of the Byzantine fresco of the Madonna and Child are still visible.
- Sanctuary of our Lady of Graces. The church was built in the seventeenth century along the Via Traiana, due to the increasing pilgrimages to venerate the fresco of the Madonna in the act of offering the breast to her son. The façade is gabled and divided into two orders; inside emerges the trompe-l'œil that decorates the precious fresco.
- Church of the Annunciation. It was built in 1375 at the behest of the inhabitants of the hamlet of Calentano, who were driven back to the city. The church has a gabled facade with a baroque portal; the interior is sparse in decorations but the canvas of the Annunciation is particularly venerated.
- Monumental cemetery. It is accessed via the approximately 1 km long avenue, named after Ugo Foscolo. It was inaugurated on January 1, 1900, and you can admire the various noble chapels.
- Cave of Saint Anacletus. Cistern from the Roman period frequented by the first Christian nucleus of Ruvestine and noteworthy for the stone sculpture of Saint Anacletus, first bishop of Ruvo.
