= Triggiano =

- Comune
- Comune di Triggiano
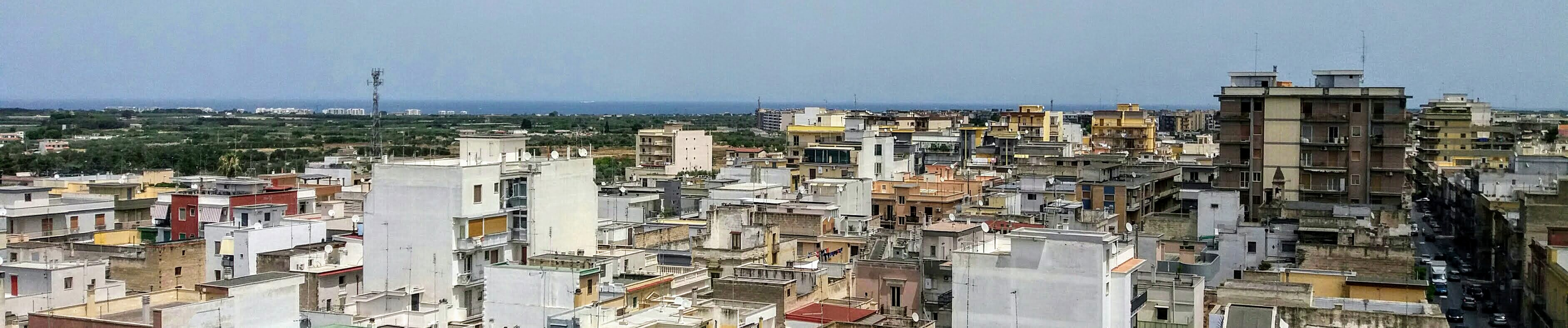

- Location within Italy Location within Apulia
- Coordinates: 41°4′N 16°55′E
- Country: Italy
- Region: Apulia
- Metropolitan city: Bari (BA)
- Frazioni: Bari, Capurso, Noicattaro

Area
  - Total: 19 km^{2} (7.3 sq mi)
- Elevation: 60 m (200 ft)

Population (31 july 2025)
  - Total: 25,545
  - Density: 1,300/km^{2} (3,500/sq mi)
- Demonym: Triggianesi
- Time zone: UTC+1 (CET)
  - Summer (DST): UTC+2 (CEST)
- Postal code: 70019
- Dialing code: 080
- ISTAT code: 072046
- Patron saint: Maria SS. della Croce
- Saint day: Third Sunday in September
- Website: Official website

Triggiano (Barese: Triggiàne) is a small town (comune) in the southern part of the Metropolitan City of Bari and region of Apulia, southern Italy. It lies a few miles inland from the port of Bari on the Adriatic Sea.

== Overview ==
The town originated in the 14th century around a "university". The "Rione Ponte" or Bridge quarter, so named for the moving bridge that allowed access to the town, retains medieval structures. Among the landmarks in the town are:

- Santa Maria Veterana hypogeum near the "Rione Ponte".
- Lama San Giorgio zone.
- San Lorenzo church in the grotto.
- Madonna della Croce church with its frescoes
- Rione Ponte

In 2025, the population of Triggiano was around 25,500 persons. Triggiano is well connected to the Bari downtown via "Sud-Est" railways and buses. Triggiano has important communities of emigrants in the United States and Venezuela. The city is a sister city of Addison, Illinois, in the United States.

During the "Madonna della Croce" city remembrance, immigrates from US and from Venezuela use to come back to visit, or to show their children, their origin. Exiles would donate money in honor of the "Madonna della Croce". This commemoration take place on the 3rd week end of September.
