= Grumo Appula =

- Comune
- Comune di Grumo Appula
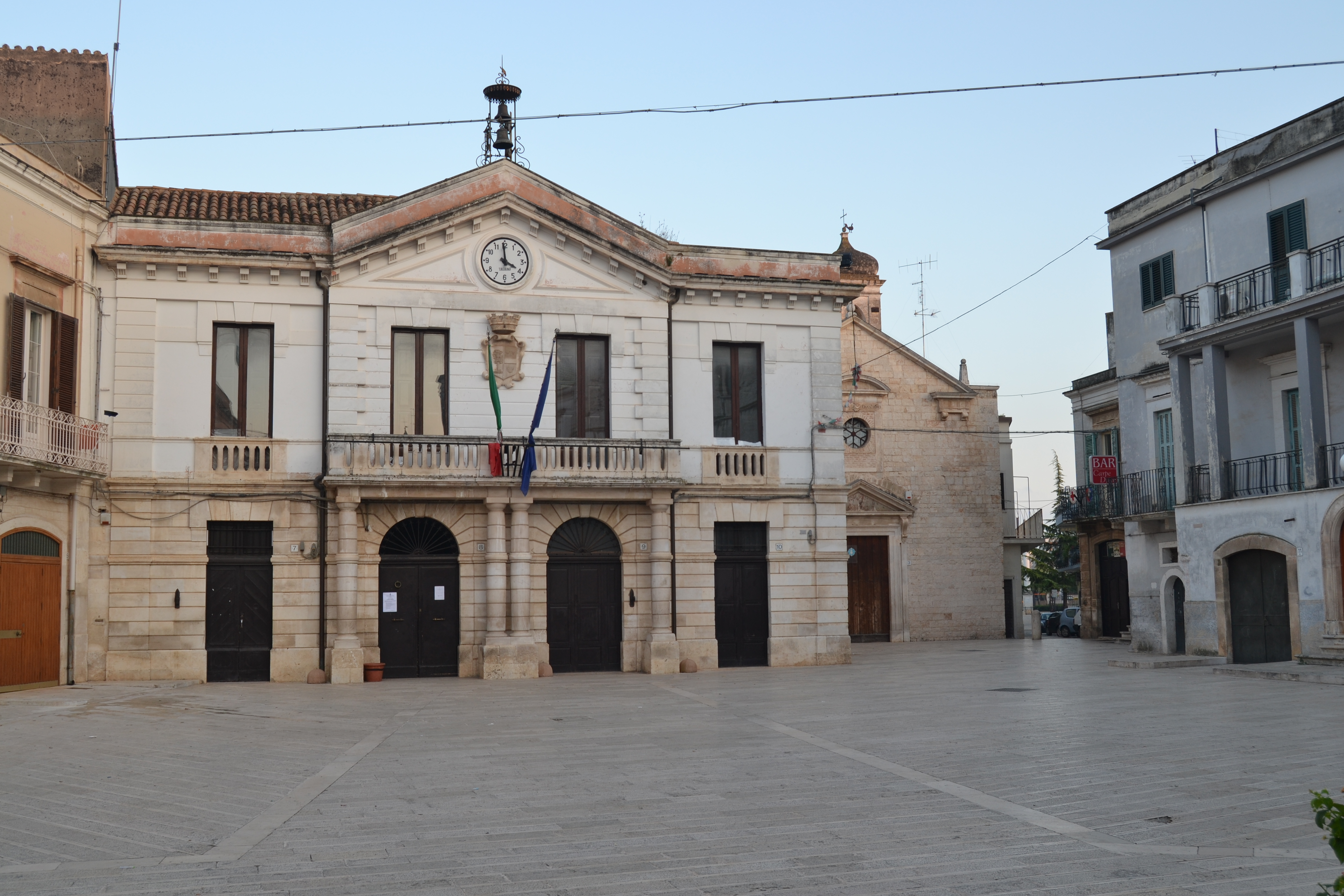
- Town hall, Grumo Appula

- Location within Italy Location within Apulia
- Coordinates: 41°1′N 16°42′E
- Country: Italy
- Region: Apulia
- Metropolitan city: Bari (BA)
- Frazioni: Mellitto

Government
  - Mayor: Michele Antonio Minenna

Area
  - Total: 81.3 km^{2} (31.4 sq mi)
- Elevation: 181 m (594 ft)

Population (31 May 2021)
  - Total: 12,205
  - Density: 150/km^{2} (389/sq mi)
- Demonym: grumesi
- Time zone: UTC+1 (CET)
  - Summer (DST): UTC+2 (CEST)
- Postal code: 70025
- Dialing code: 080
- Patron saint: St. Roch and Holy Mary of Monteverde
- Website: Official website

Grumo Appula (Barese: Gréume; Latin: Grumum) is a town and comune of the Metropolitan City of Bari, Apulia, southern Italy.

The town is a few kilometers inland from the port of Bari on the Adriatic Sea and it has a population of about 12,200. . It is part of the Alta Murgia National Park and was part of the mountain community of South-East of the Murgia Barese

Physical geography

The territory extends for about 81 km and part of it is included in the Alta Murgia National Park.

The Lagopetto municipal pine forest is one of the attractions of the national park.

The climatic and morphological characteristic allow the cultivation of olive groves and vineyards.

Origins of the name

The first element of the city's name is of uncertain origin: some trace it back to the Greek term drùmon, others to the Latin grumum, still others to a Messapian term with the same meaning as the Latin term.

The second part of the name, which refers to the historical region of Apulia, whose added only in 1863 to disambiguate the municipality from Grumo Nevano.

The City

The city originated as an Apulian center in pre-Roman times. Pliny likely refers to the inhabitants of Grumo in the Naturalis Historia (105, III), where, listing the peoples of Calabria (as Puglia was called at the time), he mentions the "Grumbestini" alongside the "Palionenses" of Palo del Colle (Palion) and the "Butuntini" of Bitonto (Butuntum). Italic tombs and Greek and Roman coins have been found in its territory.

After the fall of the Western Roman Empire, it became part of the Ostrogothic Kingdom, followed by the Byzantines, who briefly restored Italy to the Empire during Justinian's "restitutio" in the 6th century. Barely touched by Lombard rule, it later fell under Norman domination. During this period, the village was included in the fief of Conversano (Bari) and, around the mid-13th century, passed to Goffredo di Montefusco.

In 1410, it was sold by Ladislaus of Durazzo to Pietro Busio de Senis. In the 16th century, under Philip IV of Spain, the fief belonged to the Kingdom of Naples. In 1600, it passed to the Della Tolfa family, then to the Guevara family, and in 1631 to the Spanish Marquis Antonio Castellar for 56,000 ducats (although its real value was 85,000). Finally, in 1715, it became the possession of the Caracciolo family before being declared a royal city in 1800.

A proposal was once made to merge two neighboring municipalities, Toritto and Binetto, to form a new municipality, but the project was ultimately abandoned.

Symbols

The coat of arms was officially recognized by decree of the head of government on January 12, 1935, and later granted by a presidential decree on January 19, 1999.

Partially divided shield

The shield, of Samnite style, features an oak tree in the left section, while the right section depicts three crescents: one on a red field and two on a blue field. The interpretation of these crescents remains uncertain. Although they may instinctively be associated with the Arabs, who controlled Bari and its surroundings for about twenty years at the beginning of the 11th century, the crescent moon appeared on Roman military insignias from ancient times, from which the Arabs later adopted its use. Given this, the crescents on Grumo's coat of arms, in the absence of reliable sources, cannot be definitively attributed to the influence of either group of rulers over the centuries.

The shield is surmounted by a City crown, decorated with golden ornaments, and features two branches—an oak and an olive—tied together with a tricolor ribbon at the bottom.

The banner consists of a vertically divided drape: the first section in white, the second in red, and the third in blue.

Honors

In 2005, it was awarded the honorary title of "City" by decree of the President of the Republic, and in 2011, it received the title of "Garibaldian City."

Typical products Grumo Appula's territory offers a wide range of products. Some of the typical products are: olives, almonds (IGP), olive oil (IGP, DOP), mozzarella, dairy products and others local products.

Culture:

Film girati a Grumo Appula: films shot in Grumo Appula "La Stazione" directed by Sergio Urbini (1990), "Tutto l'amore Che C'è (2000), directed by Sergio Rubini, film with the actor from Bari Michele Ventucci and with Saponangelo and Margherita Buy;

Set in Puglia in the seventies, the films describe how the arrival of three girls from Milan upsets the quiet of the town, altering the habits of the local kids.

Events:

Madonna di Mellitto festival

Mellito's little church, of great importance in Grumo Appula are the patronal festivals of San Rocco and Maria di Monteverde which occur respectively in September and may.

Madonna di Mellitto festival, worthy of note is the feast of the Madonna di Melitto which takes place in the summer during the feast days, a procession is held through the streets of the town in which, in addition to the statue of the Madonna di Melitto, there are assocarts made with paper flowers. The carts, which depict religious figures, are pulled by horses. The morning after the procession in the down, the statue of the Madonna and the carts are taken, accompanied by many faithful, to the hamblet of Melitto, about 9 km from the down centre.

Tammur Festival

Performance of a folk group during the festival of "Tammur". Another important festival is the Tammur festival, which during the feast days various international folk groups. Perform throughout the down together with the brass band, small groups of musicians who usually open the procession.

The Night of the Bakers

The night of the cheese makers (also called "fari ca tremb") is a tradition of begging with teams of musicians and singers who go around the city to the sound of accordions and guitars, on the night between December 23 and 24, bring the sound of the "pastorale" and typical Christmas songs from house to house.

The Rites of Holy Week

The rites open in Grumo Appula with the procession of the addolorata, on passion Friday, an image carried on the shoulders of the butchers of the town, a procession that passes throughout the streets of the city. At the end, some men, about 20, in piazza Cardinale Colasuonno, sing the canto del venerdì Santo, an ancient dirge entirely in the grumese dialect, which narrates the passion of Christ. On good Friday instead there is the procession of the mysteries, a procession composed of 12 papier – mache statues made between the end of 1700 and the beginning of 1900. The spiritual presentation of the individual mysteries, which takes place at the exit from the mother church in Corso Umberto after a brief reflection by the parish priest, the delivery of the crucifix in to the hands of the Addolorata takes place.

Schools:

Primary schools: 2 (G.Devito Francesco elementary school)

Lowers secondary schools: 2 (Giovanni XXIII middle school)

Secondary schools: 1 ("Tommasso Fiore Hospitality, Catering and Techinical Economic school")

== People ==
- Francesco Colasuonno (1925–2003), cardinal and Vatican diplomat
- Sergio Rubini (1959–), actor and film director
- Francesco Laforgia (1978–), politician
- Nicola Ventola (1978–), footballer
- Massimo Stano (1992–), Olympic champion racewalking
