= Domenico Cantatore =

Italian painter (1906–1998)

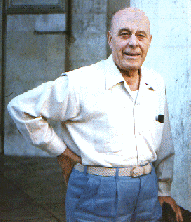
Domenico Cantatore

Domenico Cantatore (Ruvo di Puglia 16 March 1906 – Paris 22 May 1998) was an Italian painter, mosaic artist and illustrator. His style, somewhat naive, is influenced by Cezanne, Matisse, and the Expressionists. His main focus was portraiture and the exploration of historical themes, in particular the figure of the reclining odalisques.

== Biography ==
Domenico Cantatore was born in Ruvo di Puglia in Apulia. He was the younger of eight siblings. In 1922 he moved to Rome, and from there in 1924 to Milan, where he began to paint. In Milan he befriended the art critic Raffaele Carrieri and collector Margherita Sarfatti. In 1929 he had his first solo show at Galleria Milano, where his work was praised by Carlo Carrà.

In 1932, Cantatore moved to Paris, where he befriended Henri Matisse and Amedeo Modigliani. The next year, Edoardo Persico helped him organising an exhibition, mostly made of drawings, at the Brera Academy. In 1934 he had a solo presentation at Galleria del Milione.

In 1935 Cantatore moved back to Milan, where for a few years he expanded his practice to writing. In 1966 he published his first novel, Ritorno al paese. (Back to the Country) His long friendship with Salvatore Quasimodo resulted in Quasimodo writing a catalogue essay for Cantatore's exhibition at Galleria d'Arte Corocchia in Milan. He also joined the Novecento Italiano movement together with Giuseppe Migneco, Aligi Sassu, and Bruno Cassinari, although he was somewhat resistant to embrace the group's politics.

In 1940, he was appointed Professor of Figure Drawing at the Liceo artistico in Milan. That year, his painting Woman dressing won the Premio Principe Umberto. In 1947, he won the Premio Modena with the painting Woman Sewing and in 1950, the Premio Suzzara. In 1950 he was appointed Professor of Painting at the Brera Academy, where, among his students, were artists like Natale Addamiano, Sabino Gesmundo and Paola Grott. Parallel to teaching he continued to work on his art throughout the 1950s. His work was exhibited at the XXIX Venice Biennale and the VII Rome Quadriennale. He also had solo shows in Milan at Galleria Barbaroux, Galleria dell'Annunciata and Galleria Gianferrari.

In 1959, he was commissioned to make twenty windows in the Basilica of San Domenico in Siena.

Cantatore died in Paris in 1998.

== Bibliography ==
- Sergio Solmi, Domenico Cantatore, Edizioni di Documento, Rome, 1942.
- Salvatore Quasimodo, Cantatore. Acquarelli Disegni Incisioni, Galleria d'Arte Cavour, Messina, 1965.
- Luigi Cavallo, Mosaici di Domenico Cantatore, Galleria d'Arte Corocchia, Milan, 1970.
- Enzo Carli, Dino Carlesi, Domenico Cantatore: Dipinti e Opere Grafiche, Bandecchi & Vivaldi, Pontedera, 1988.
