= Poggiorsini =

- Comune
- Comune di Poggiorsini
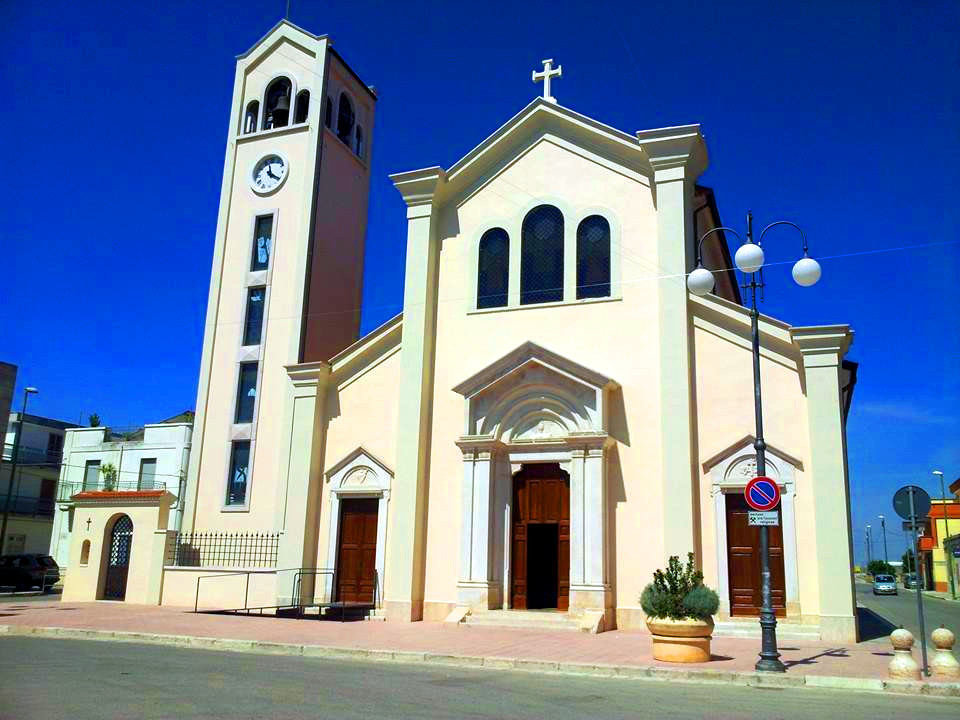
- Church of Maria Santissima Addolorata

- Location within Italy Location within Apulia
- Coordinates: 40°55′N 16°15′E
- Country: Italy
- Region: Apulia
- Metropolitan city: Bari (BA)

Government
  - Mayor: Michele Armienti

Area
  - Total: 43.44 km^{2} (16.77 sq mi)
- Elevation: 461 m (1,512 ft)

Population (31 March 2018)
  - Total: 1,508
  - Density: 34.71/km^{2} (89.91/sq mi)
- Demonym: Poggiorsinesi
- Time zone: UTC+1 (CET)
  - Summer (DST): UTC+2 (CEST)
- Postal code: 70020
- Dialing code: 080
- Patron saint: Maria SS. Addolorata
- Saint day: 11 August
- Website: Official website

Poggiorsini (Poggiorsinese: Paggiarsìne or Poggiorséine) is a comune in the Metropolitan City of Bari, Apulia, south-eastern Italy with a population of 1367. The main settlement, also called Poggiorsini, is a village laying about 85 kilometres (53 mi) from Bari, laying between the towns of Spinazzola and Gravina.
