= Cellamare =

- Comune
- Comune di Cellamare
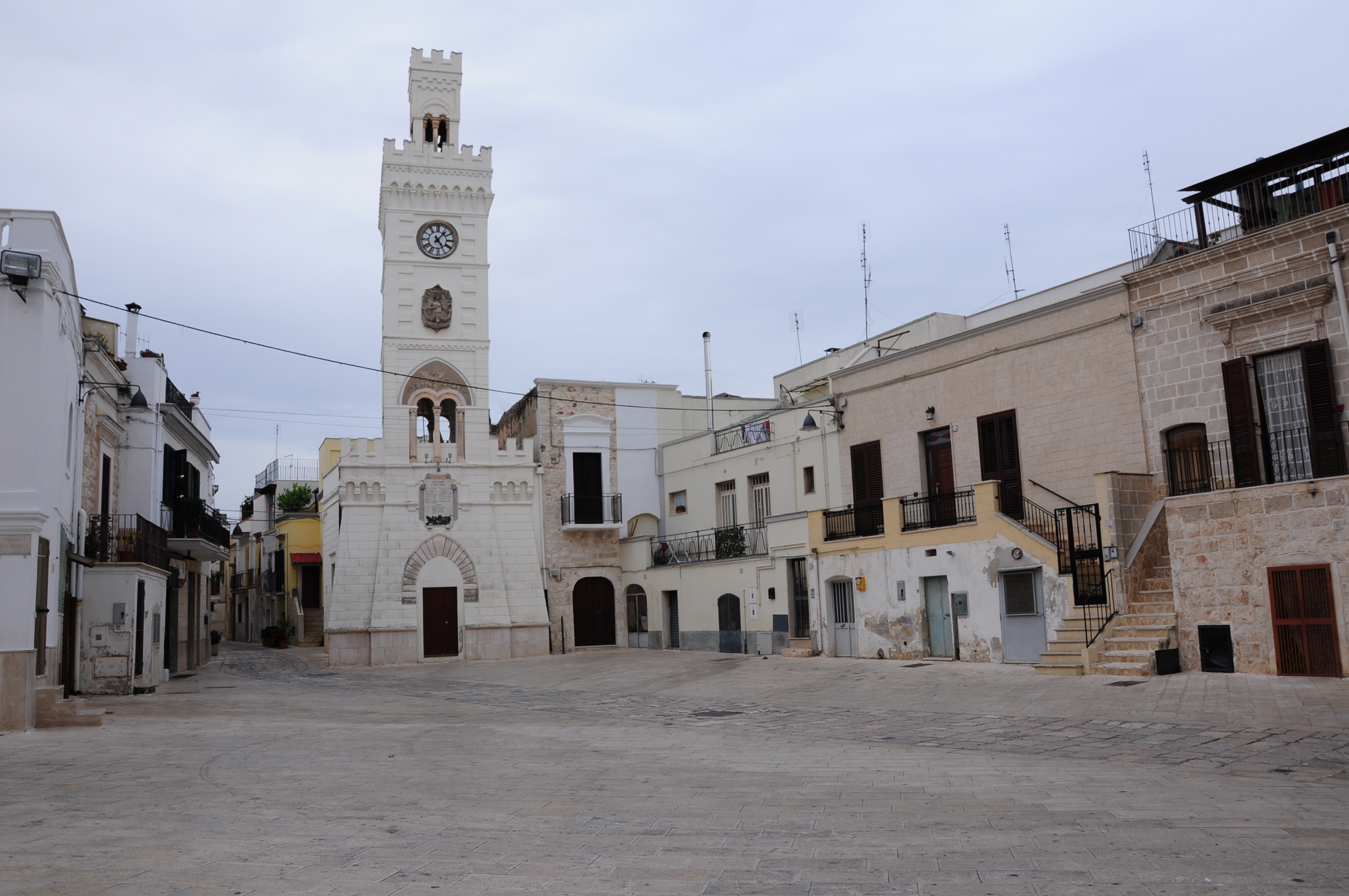

- Location within Italy Location within Apulia
- Coordinates: 41°1′13″N 16°55′45″E
- Country: Italy
- Region: Apulia
- Metropolitan city: Bari (BA)
- Frazioni: Capurso, Casamassima, Noicattaro

Government
  - Mayor: Gianluca Vurchio

Area
  - Total: 5 km^{2} (1.9 sq mi)
- Elevation: 110 m (360 ft)

Population (31 July 2025)
  - Total: 5,780
  - Density: 1,200/km^{2} (3,000/sq mi)
- Demonym: Cellamaresi
- Time zone: UTC+1 (CET)
  - Summer (DST): UTC+2 (CEST)
- Postal code: 70010
- Dialing code: 080
- ISTAT code: 072018
- Patron saint: Saint Amator
- Saint day: 30 April
- Website: Official website

Cellamare is a town and comune in the Metropolitan City of Bari, in Apulia, in southern Italy.

The town claims to have been founded by Archbishop Rainaldo in the year 1171. Its name comes from the phrase Cella D'Amore (literally "love cell"). Its primary industry is grapes.
