= Metropolitan City of Bari =

Coordinates: 41°7′31″N 16°52′0″E

Metropolitan City of Bari Città metropolitana di Bari (Italian)
- Metropolitan City
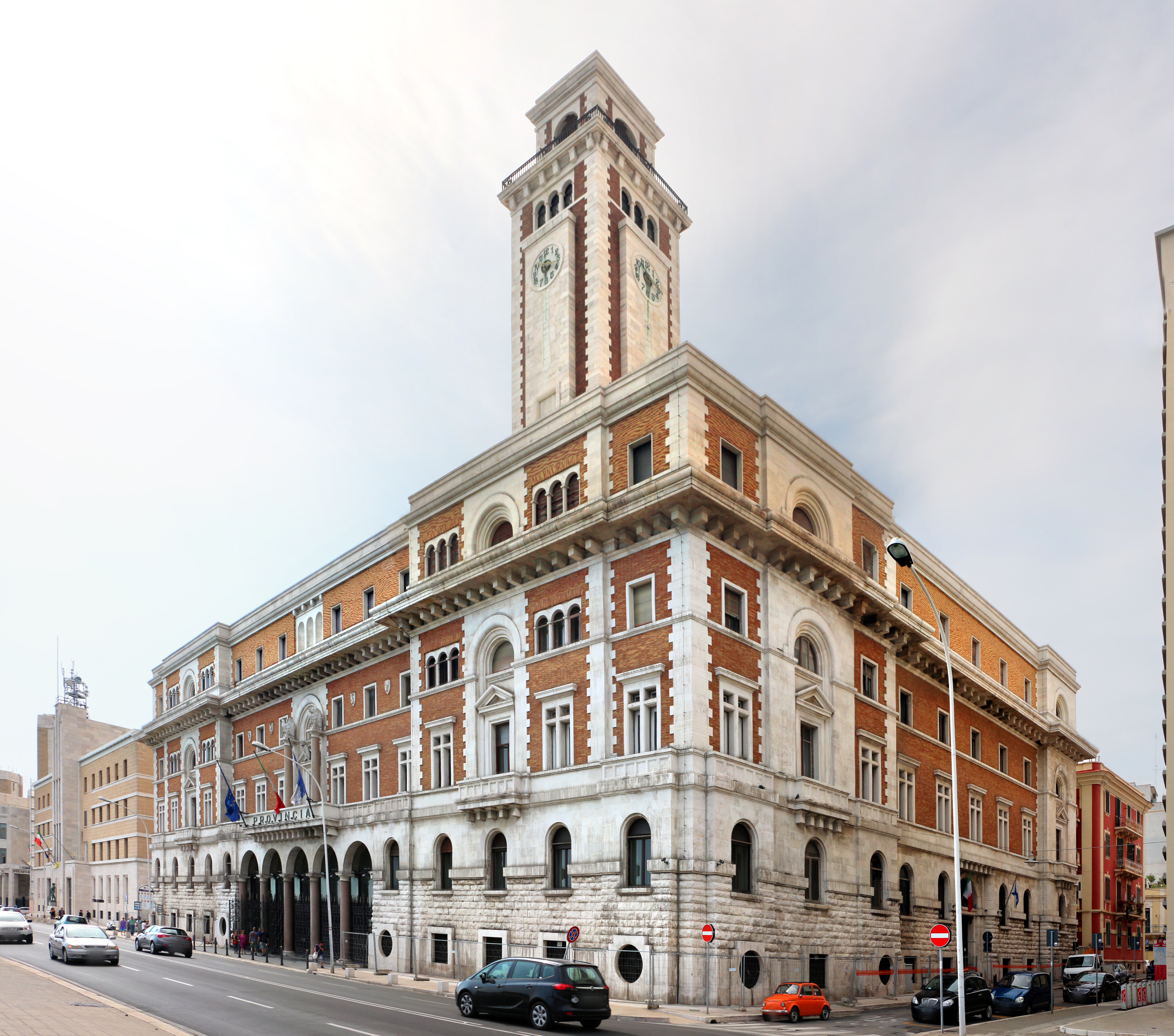
- The Provincial Building of Bari, today, the institutional headquarters of the Metropolitan City of Bari

- Flag Coat of arms

- Location of the Metropolitan City of Bari in Italy
- Country: Italy
- Region: Apulia
- Capital(s): Bari
- Municipalities: 41

Government
  - Metropolitan mayor: Vito Leccese

Area
  - Total: 3,862.88 km^{2} (1,491.47 sq mi)

Population (2026)
  - Total: 1,218,073
  - Density: 315.328/km^{2} (816.695/sq mi)

GDP
  - Metro: €28.220 billion (2015)
  - Per capita: €22,945 (2015)
- Time zone: UTC+1 (CET)
  - Summer (DST): UTC+2 (CEST)
- Postal code: 70001–70100
- Telephone prefix: 080, 0883
- Vehicle registration: BA
- ISTAT code: 072

The Metropolitan City of Bari (Italian: città metropolitana di Bari) is a metropolitan city in the region of Apulia of Italy. Its capital is the city of Bari. It replaced the province of Bari and includes the city of Bari and 40 other municipalities. It was first created by the reform of local authorities (Law 142/1990) and then established by the Law 56/2014. It has been operative since January 1, 2015.

The Metropolitan City of Bari is headed by the Metropolitan Mayor (sindaco metropolitano) and by the Metropolitan Council (consiglio metropolitano). Since 1 January 2015 Antonio Decaro, as mayor of the capital city, has been the first mayor of the Metropolitan City.

It has a population of 1,218,073 in an area of 3,862.88 km^{2} (1,491.47 sq mi).

== Geography ==
Overlooking the Adriatic Sea in south-eastern Italy, the Metropolitan City of Bari is located in the central part of Apulia and is bordered on the west by the provinces of Matera and Potenza, to the north by the province of Barletta-Andria-Trani, and to the south by the provinces of Taranto and Brindisi. The old province of Bari was formerly a part of the region of Terra di Bari, which once included the towns of Fasano and Cisternino, now in the province of Brindisi.

The area is dominated by the Murgia hills in the inner part, a karst plateau which is the home of the Alta Murgia National Park, one of the newest national parks in Italy, established in 2004. Only the Bari hinterland and the coastal strip are flat. The north of the province, with Bari, Altamura, Bitonto, Corato, Gravina in Puglia, and Molfetta, is heavily populated. The south, on the contrary, does not have large population centers; its only southern municipality near 50,000 inhabitants is Monopoli. In the southern part, on the border with Taranto, is the Itria Valley, between the towns of Alberobello, Locorotondo, Cisternino and Martina Franca. Bari is largely devoid of rivers and lakes, although underground rivers in the karst landscape have formed numerous caves, including those of Castellana and Putignano.

=== Municipalities ===
With the establishment of the Province of Barletta-Andria-Trani in 2004, in addition to the provincial capitals, the province of Bari lost another four municipalities: Bisceglie, Canosa di Puglia, Minervino Murge and Spinazzola. This left the remaining Province of Bari with 41 municipalities:

- Acquaviva delle Fonti
- Adelfia
- Alberobello
- Altamura
- Bari
- Binetto
- Bitetto
- Bitonto
- Bitritto
- Capurso
- Casamassima
- Castellana Grotte
- Cellamare
- Conversano
- Corato
- Gioia del Colle
- Giovinazzo
- Gravina in Puglia
- Grumo Appula
- Locorotondo
- Modugno
- Mola di Bari
- Molfetta
- Monopoli
- Noci
- Noicattaro
- Palo del Colle
- Poggiorsini
- Polignano a Mare
- Putignano
- Rutigliano
- Ruvo di Puglia
- Santeramo in Colle
- Sannicandro di Bari
- Terlizzi
- Toritto
- Triggiano
- Turi
- Valenzano

== Demographics ==
Historical population
Year	Pop.	±%
1861	403,284	—
1871	440,847	+9.3%
1881	493,035	+11.8%
1901	604,331	+22.6%
1911	668,570	+10.6%
1921	710,397	+6.3%
1931	734,252	+3.4%
1936	778,113	+6.0%
1951	928,366	+19.3%
1961	981,507	+5.7%
1971	1,060,037	+8.0%
1981	1,154,535	+8.9%
1991	1,202,704	+4.2%
2001	1,218,038	+1.3%
2011	1,247,303	+2.4%
2021	1,226,784	−1.6%
Source: ISTAT

As of 2026, the population is 1,218,073, of which 48.9% are male, and 51.1% are female. Minors make up 14.6% of the population, and seniors make up 24.8%.

=== Immigration ===
As of 2025, immigrants make up 5.5% of the population. The 5 largest foreign countries of birth are Albania, Georgia, Romania, Germany, and Venezuela.

== Government ==
=== List of metropolitan mayors ===
	Metropolitan Mayor	Term start	Term end	Party
1	Antonio Decaro	1 January 2015	9 July 2024	PD
2	Vito Leccese	9 July 2024	Incumbent	PD

== Economy ==
The arable land in the province of Bari is exploited with the cultivation of olive and grapes, but also cherries, peaches, and almonds. From that agricultural activity is derived olive oil, wine and table grapes. Bitonto is especially noted for its extra virgin olive oil, and Corato (with the Coratina olive variety) and Giovinazzo are along notable producing areas. The centers of wine production are mainly concentrated in Gravina and Ruvo di Puglia, in the north of Bari, and Adelfia, Noicattaro, Rutigliano and Locorotondo, in the south of Bari. Also important is the production of cherries; the Apulian red is especially prevalent in the countryside of Turi and Putignano.

== See also ==
- Province of Bari
