= Valenzano, Apulia =

Valenzano Greek: Valentianó
- Comune
- Comune di Valenzano
- Coat of arms

- Location within Italy Location within Apulia
- Coordinates: 41°3′N 16°53′E
- Country: Italy
- Region: Apulia
- Metropolitan city: Bari (BA)
- Frazioni: San Lorenzo

Government
  - Mayor: Giampaolo Romanazzi

Area
  - Total: 15 km^{2} (5.8 sq mi)
- Elevation: 85 m (279 ft)

Population (31 December 2010)
  - Total: 18,305
  - Density: 1,200/km^{2} (3,200/sq mi)
- Demonym: Valenzanesi
- Time zone: UTC+1 (CET)
  - Summer (DST): UTC+2 (CEST)
- Postal code: 70010
- Dialing code: 080
- ISTAT code: 072048
- Patron saint: St Roch, St Anthony of Padua
- Saint day: 15–16–17 August (St. Roch); 13 June (St. Anthony)
- Website: Official website

Map of comune of Valenzano (metropolitan city of Bari, region Apulia, Italy)

Valenzano (Barese: Valzàne) is a town and comune in the Metropolitan City of Bari, in Apulia, Italy. It is home to several centers of scientific research, including Tecnopolis, one of the biggest of the Southern Italy in addition to The Mediterranean Agronomic Institute of Bari (IAMB) part of the International Centre for Advanced Mediterranean Agronomic Studies (CIHEAM). Valenzano is the seat of the "Antonio de Viti de Marco" Technical, Economic and Technological Institute (among which the Environmental Biotechnology specialization, established in the 2014-15 school year, stands out).

Sights include the All Saints' Church, a former 11th century abbey, and the late Renaissance church of St Roch. The baronial castle was reconstructed in 1870.

== History ==
According to medieval historian Bonaventura da Lama, Valenzano was founded by a Greek man, named Valentinian or Valentian, who arrived in Apulia in the 8th-9th century escaping an invasion of Saracens. Historically, the area was inhabited in prehistoric and early historic times (up to 4th century BC) by the Peucetii, of Illyrian origins, as testified by funerary findings.
