= Bitritto =

- Comune
- Comune di Bitritto
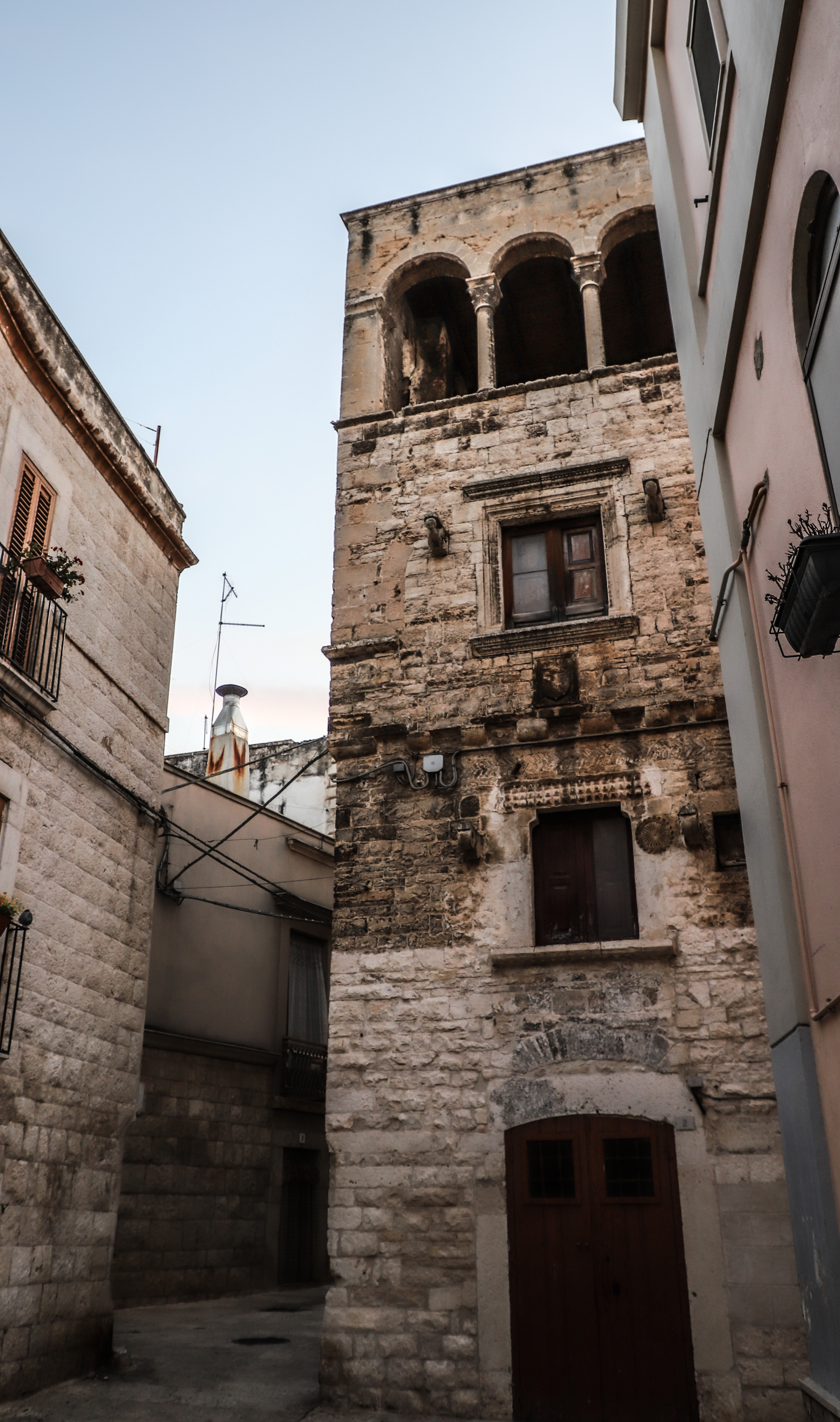
- View of Bitritto

- Location within Italy Location within Apulia
- Coordinates: 41°3′N 16°50′E
- Country: Italy
- Region: Apulia
- Metropolitan city: Bari (BA)

Government
  - Mayor: Giuseppe Giulitto

Area
  - Total: 17.98 km^{2} (6.94 sq mi)
- Elevation: 102 m (335 ft)

Population (31 December 2007)
  - Total: 10,530
  - Density: 585.7/km^{2} (1,517/sq mi)
- Demonym: Bitrittesi
- Time zone: UTC+1 (CET)
  - Summer (DST): UTC+2 (CEST)
- Postal code: 70020
- Dialing code: 080
- Patron saint: Maria ss. di Costantinopoli
- Saint day: First Tuesday in March
- Website: Official website

Bitritto (Barese: Vetrìtte) is a town and comune in the Metropolitan City of Bari, Apulia, in southern Italy.
