= Rutigliano =

- Comune
- Comune di Rutigliano
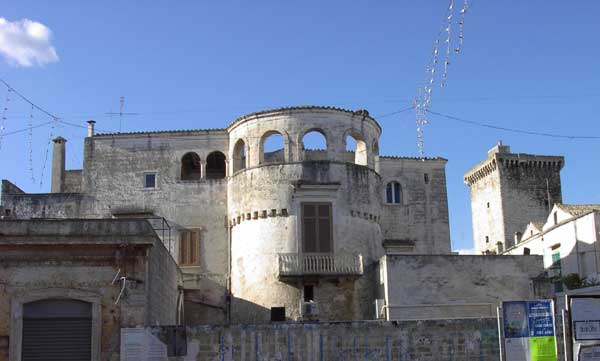
- Castle of Rutigliano

- Coat of arms

- Location within Italy Location within Apulia
- Coordinates: 40°56′N 16°54′E
- Country: Italy
- Region: Apulia
- Metropolitan city: Bari (BA)

Government
  - Mayor: Roberto Romagno

Area
  - Total: 53.85 km^{2} (20.79 sq mi)
- Elevation: 125 m (410 ft)

Population (28 June 2016)
  - Total: 18,644
  - Density: 346.2/km^{2} (896.7/sq mi)
- Demonym(s): Rutiglianese (plural: rutiglianesi)
- Time zone: UTC+1 (CET)
  - Summer (DST): UTC+2 (CEST)
- Postal code: 70018
- Dialing code: 080
- Patron saint: St. Nicholas
- Saint day: 6 December
- Website: Official website

Rutigliano (Italian pronunciation: [ˈrutiʎʎaːno]; Barese: Retegghiéne) is a town and commune in the Metropolitan City of Bari, Apulia, southern Italy.

== Main sights ==
- Norman castle (11th century), built above a pre-existing Byzantine watchtower or fortification
- Collegiate church of Santa Maria della Colonna
- Church of Sant'Andrea
- Church of San Vincenzo
- Post Office
