= Castellana Grotte =

- Comune
- Comune di Castellana Grotte
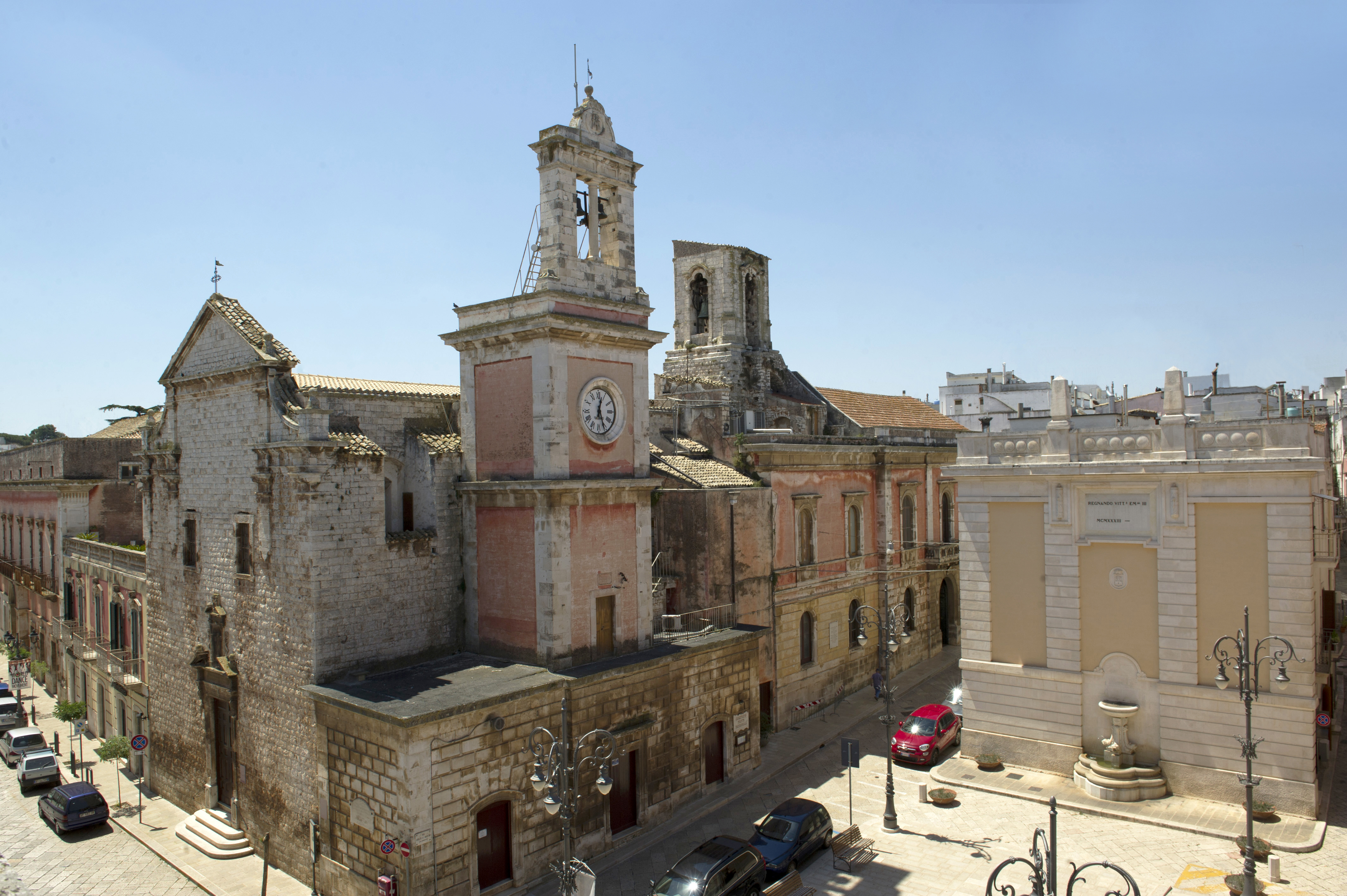

- Location within Italy Location within Apulia
- Coordinates: 40°53′N 17°10′E
- Country: Italy
- Region: Apulia
- Metropolitan city: Bari (BA)

Government
  - Mayor: Domi Ciliberti

Area
  - Total: 67.96 km^{2} (26.24 sq mi)
- Elevation: 290 m (950 ft)

Population (2010)
  - Total: 19,435
  - Density: 286.0/km^{2} (740.7/sq mi)
- Demonym: Castellanesi
- Time zone: UTC+1 (CET)
  - Summer (DST): UTC+2 (CEST)
- Postal code: 70013
- Dialing code: 080
- Patron saint: St. Mary, St. Leone
- Saint day: January 12
- Website: Official website

Castellana Grotte (Castellanese: Casteddône) is a town and comune in the Metropolitan City of Bari, Apulia, southern Italy. Grotte means "caves" in Italian.

== Geography ==
Agricultural center of the lower Murgia, it is 40 kilometres (25 mi) south of Bari.

== Caves ==
One of the most important attractions in Apulia are the caves of Castellana Grotte, a system of caverns of the karst origin. Stalagmites, stalactites, canyons and caves characterise this pathway long 3 km to more than 60 meters deep. The Grotte of Castellana were discovered January 23, 1938 by cavers Franco Anelli and Vito Matarrese with the help of a little boy named Giovanni Mansueto who they sent down in search of the caves.

== Notable residents ==
Francesco Laporta, professional golfer.

== See also ==
- Castellana Caves
