= Adelfia =

Adelfia Adélfie
- Comune
- Comune di Adelfia
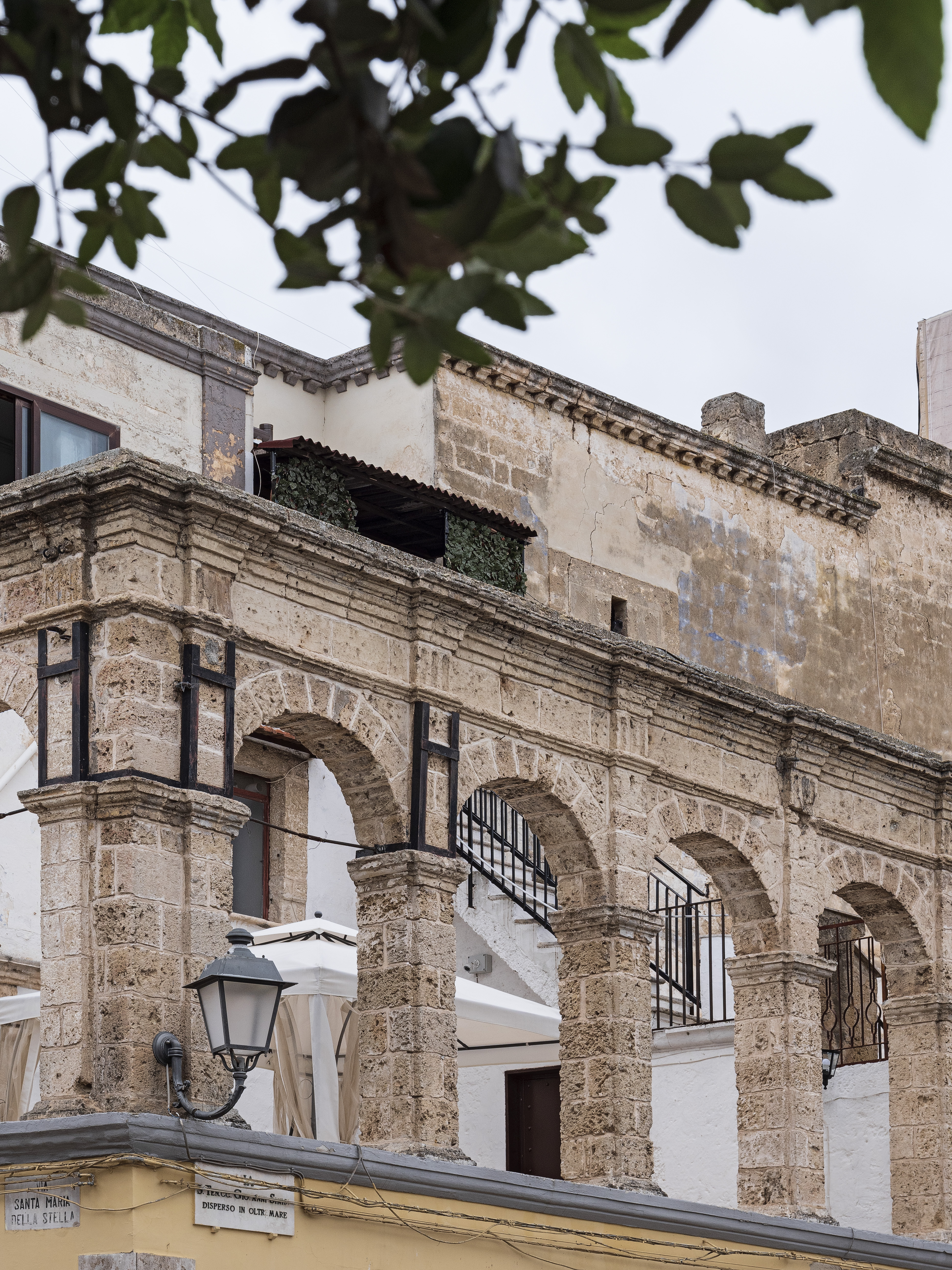
- View of Adelfia

- Location within Italy Location within Apulia
- Coordinates: 41°00′N 16°52′E
- Country: Italy
- Region: Apulia
- Metropolitan city: Bari (BA)
- Frazioni: Canneto, Montrone

Government
  - Mayor: Giuseppe Cosola

Area
  - Total: 33.81 km^{2} (13.05 sq mi)
- Elevation: 154 m (505 ft)

Population (31-8-2022)
  - Total: 16,471
  - Density: 487.2/km^{2} (1,262/sq mi)
- Demonym: Adelfiesi
- Time zone: UTC+1 (CET)
  - Summer (DST): UTC+2 (CEST)
- Postal code: 70010
- Dialing code: 080
- Patron saint: St. Tryphon
- Saint day: 10 November
- Website: Official website

Adelfia (Greek: Αδέλφια, meaning brothers; Barese: Adélfie) is a town and comune in the Metropolitan City of Bari, Apulia, southern Italy. The town is 18 km (11 mi) south of central Bari, and is a combination of two smaller towns, Montrone and Canneto.

== History ==
The urban centre includes two former villages that were separated for a long time. Canneto was founded by the Normans of Robert Guiscard between 1080 and 1090, on the place of an ancient centre (probably to be identified with Celiae), documented from ceramics and more recent graves from the 4th century. Montrone was founded in 980 by Greek refugees. Both had been subdued to varied feudal lords until 1806, when feudalism was abolished under the Kingdom of Two Sicilies. The two villages were united in 1927 under the artificial name of Adelfia, from the Greek term adelphòs, meaning brotherhood.

Between the 19th and the 20th century, there was considerable emigration to the United States. Town life is now mainly connected to nearby Bari.

Adelfia has a strong Catholic tradition. Its citizens celebrate the feasts of its patron saints, San Trifone (in Montrone) and San Vittoriano (in Canneto), in November and July each year. The celebrations include fairs, masses and fireworks competitions, which attract thousands of pilgrims from all over the world.
