= Noci =

- Comune
- Comune di Noci
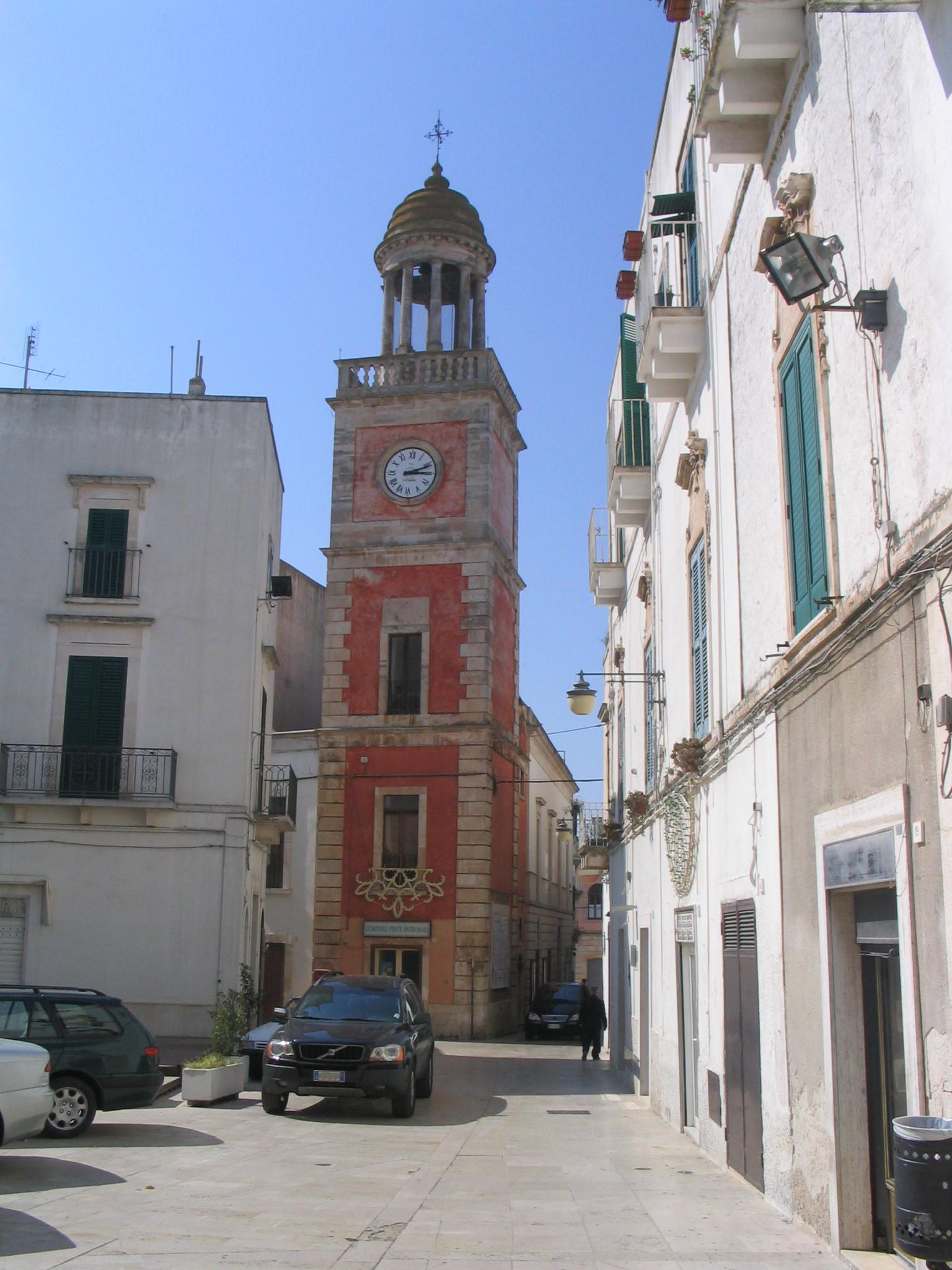
- Torre dell'Orologio in piazza Plebiscito

- Coat of arms

- Location within Italy Location within Apulia
- Coordinates: 40°48′N 17°8′E
- Country: Italy
- Region: Apulia
- Metropolitan city: Bari (BA)
- Frazioni: Lamadacqua

Government
  - Mayor: Francesco Intini (Democratic Party)

Area
  - Total: 148 km^{2} (57 sq mi)
- Elevation: 424 m (1,391 ft)

Population (31 December 2010)
  - Total: 19,477
  - Density: 132/km^{2} (341/sq mi)
- Demonym: Nocesi
- Time zone: UTC+1 (CET)
  - Summer (DST): UTC+2 (CEST)
- Postal code: 70015
- Dialing code: 080
- ISTAT code: 072031
- Patron saint: Our Lady of Sorrows, Madonna della Croce; St. Roch
- Saint day: 3 May; First Sunday in September
- Website: Official website

Noci (Nocese: I Nusce) is a city and comune in the Metropolitan city of Bari in the region of Apulia, in southern Italy. It has about twenty thousand inhabitants. Established during the Norman time in Italy, the town developed during the Angevin period. On a west to east line it is located between Gioia del Colle and Alberobello. Most buildings in the town are built in a traditional style and are packed together with few open spaces.
