= Turi, Apulia =

Turi
- Comune
- Comune di Turi
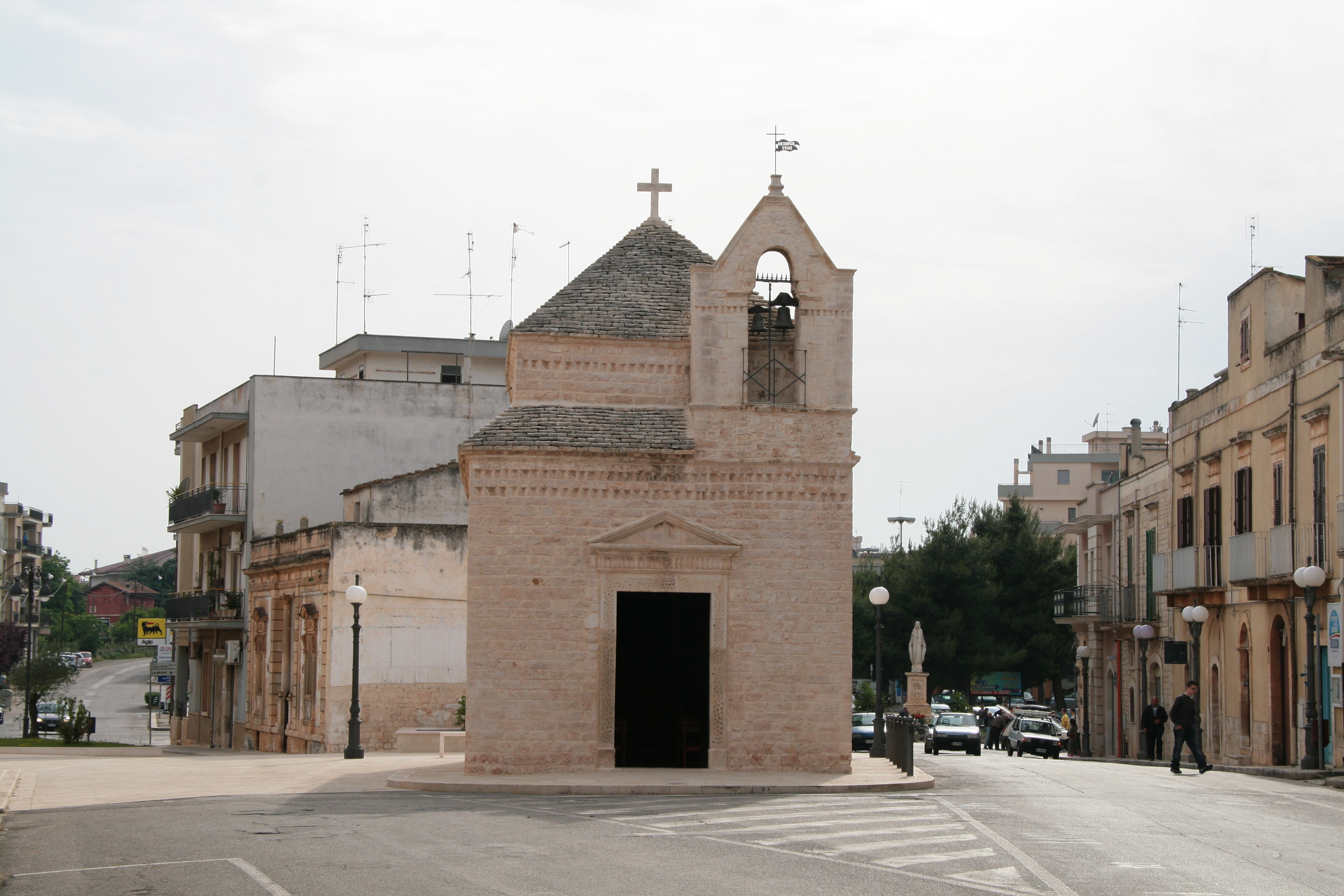
- Church of San Rocco

- Coat of arms

- Location within Italy Location within Apulia
- Coordinates: 40°58′N 17°07′E
- Country: Italy
- Region: Apulia
- Metropolitan city: Bari (BA)

Government
  - Mayor: Giuseppe De Tomaso

Area
  - Total: 70 km^{2} (27 sq mi)
- Elevation: 254 m (833 ft)

Population (December 31, 2004)
  - Total: 11,881
  - Density: 170/km^{2} (440/sq mi)
- Demonym: Turesi
- Time zone: UTC+1 (CET)
  - Summer (DST): UTC+2 (CEST)
- Postal code: 70010
- Dialing code: 080
- Patron saint: Sant'Oronzo
- Saint day: August 26
- Website: Official website

Turi (Turese: Ture [ˈtuːrə]; Ancient Greek: Θυριαι, romanized: Thuriai) is a town and comune in the Metropolitan City of Bari and region of Apulia, southern Italy. With a population approaching 12,000, it lies a few miles inland from the town of Polignano A Mare on the Adriatic Sea.

The Italian Marxist Antonio Gramsci, imprisoned by Benito Mussolini's Fascist regime for eleven years (1926-1937), served most of his sentence in Turi, and died shortly after he was released.
