= Binetto =

- Comune
- Comune di Binetto
- Location within Italy Location within Apulia
- Coordinates: 41°01′27″N 16°42′38″E
- Country: Italy
- Region: Apulia
- Metropolitan city: Bari (BA)

Government
  - Mayor: Vito Bozzi

Area
  - Total: 17.65 km^{2} (6.81 sq mi)
- Elevation: 170 m (560 ft)

Population (30 April 2017)
  - Total: 2,225
  - Density: 126.1/km^{2} (326.5/sq mi)
- Demonym: Binettesi
- Time zone: UTC+1 (CET)
  - Summer (DST): UTC+2 (CEST)
- Postal code: 70020
- Dialing code: 080
- Patron saint: St. Crescentius
- Saint day: 7 April
- Website: Official website

Binetto (Barese: Venétte) is a town and comune in the Metropolitan City of Bari, Apulia, southern Italy.
