= Toritto =

- Comune
- Comune di Toritto
- Location within Italy Location within Apulia
- Coordinates: 41°00′N 16°41′E
- Country: Italy
- Region: Apulia
- Metropolitan city: Bari (BA)
- Frazioni: Quasano, Altaserra

Government
  - Mayor: Pasquale Regina

Area
  - Total: 75.35 km^{2} (29.09 sq mi)
- Elevation: 233 m (764 ft)

Population (1 September 2016)
  - Total: 8,001
  - Density: 106.2/km^{2} (275.0/sq mi)
- Demonym: Torittesi
- Time zone: UTC+1 (CET)
  - Summer (DST): UTC+2 (CEST)
- Postal code: 70020
- Dialing code: 080
- Patron saint: St. Roch, Madonna delle Grazie
- Saint day: August 16
- Website: Official website

Toritto (Barese: Trìtt or Torìtte) is a town and comune in the Metropolitan City of Bari and region of Apulia, southern Italy.

It lies in an agricultural area, growing mainly almond and olive trees, about 20 km from the Adriatic Sea.

== History ==
The origins of the city are uncertain, but they probably date to around 800 AD, although the first document testifying to the existence of Toritto is from 1069. A parish existed in 1171.

== Main sights ==
- Torre dell'Orologio (Watchtower), with a 1564 inscription.
- Chiesa Madre (Mother Church), built in 1410 and entitled to St. Nicholas.
- Chiesa della Madonna della Stella, erected before 1092.
