= Corato =

Corato Griko: Rhypsi
- Comune
- Comune di Corato
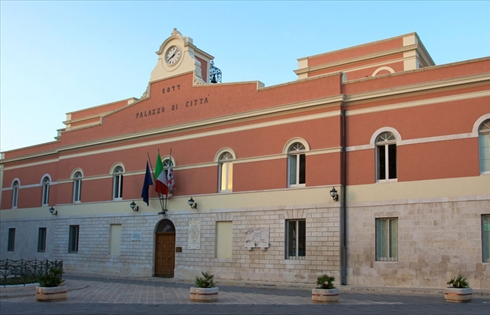
- Town hall of Corato

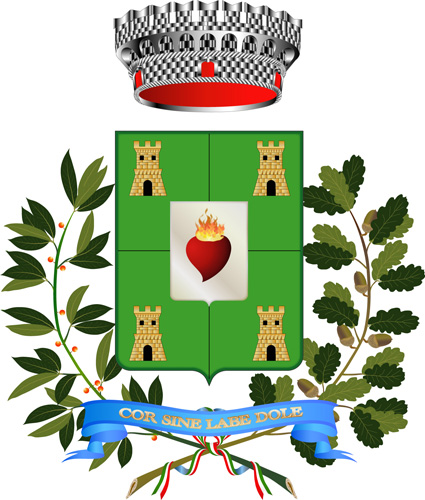
- Coat of arms

- Location within Italy Location within Apulia
- Coordinates: 41°9′N 16°24′E
- Country: Italy
- Region: Apulia
- Metropolitan city: Bari (BA)

Government
  - Mayor: Corrado Nicola De Benedittis

Area
  - Total: 167 km^{2} (64 sq mi)
- Elevation: 232 m (761 ft)

Population (30 September 2017)
  - Total: 48,316
  - Density: 289/km^{2} (749/sq mi)
- Demonym: Coratini
- Time zone: UTC+1 (CET)
  - Summer (DST): UTC+2 (CEST)
- Postal code: 70033
- Dialing code: 080
- Patron saint: St. Catald
- Saint day: 10 May
- Website: Official website

Corato (Barese: Quaratë) is a city and comune in Italy. It is located in the Metropolitan City of Bari, Apulia, in southeastern Italy. Founded by the Normans, it became subject to Alfonso V, king of Aragon, at the end of the 15th century, and later to the Carafa family. The chief feature of the old town centre, which is surrounded by modern buildings, is the Romanesque church. It is a twin city of Grenoble, France, where many Coratini immigrated during the 20th century.

== History ==
The origins of the current town of Corato date back to the 3rd century BC, during the Roman Republican era, when Scipio Africanus rewarded veterans of the conquest of Carthage by granting them several territories in Apulia. One of them, a certain Caius Oratus, is said to have owned an area as a Roman patrician, where he built a village, which he named after his own. Over the centuries, the name varied between Coratus, Coratum, Curati (in the Norman-Swabian era), Quarata, and Quadrata until, in the Bourbon era, the town took its official name of Corato.

The modern town of Corato was founded in 1046 by Peter I of Trani, adding a castle, four angular towers, the perimeter enclosing walls, four access gates, and two main perpendicular streets. These elements, typical of a mediaeval town, were preserved until the 16th century. From the 17th century onwards, Corato grew beyond its historic center, and numerous churches and aristocratic palaces were built.

Corato is now an agricultural and industrial centre of the hinterland of Bari, located 43 kilometres (27 mi) west from it and at 232 metres (761 ft) above sea level. The town is well known for olive production, and is the source of the name of the Coratina olive.

On 12 July 2016, a head-on collision between two passenger trains occurred near Corato. At least 23 people were killed and dozens more injured.

=== Main sights ===
- The town hall, built in the 16th century as a monastery.
- The cathedral, Corato's oldest church, together with the San Vito church. It was built in the 12th century is Romanesque style. The portal features the statues of Jesus Christ, the Virgin and St. John the Baptist.
- De Mattis Palace (15th century). It has a stone with diamond point covering the first level of the palace. At the corner is Patroni Griffi's emblem, an aristocratic family which owned this palace. The emblem represents a griffon (Griffi's coat of arms) and a hand which holds an anchor (Patroni's coat of arms).
- Catalano Palace, also from the 15th century.
- The museum, once a prison. It includes two sections, devoted to historical-archeological and anthropological findings respectively.

== International relationships ==
Corato is twinned with:

- Grenoble, France

== Climate ==
Climate data for Corato (1991–2020 normals)
Month	Jan	Feb	Mar	Apr	May	Jun	Jul	Aug	Sep	Oct	Nov	Dec	Year
Mean daily maximum °C (°F)	11.5 (52.7)	12.3 (54.1)	15.0 (59.0)	18.8 (65.8)	23.7 (74.7)	28.4 (83.1)	30.8 (87.4)	30.8 (87.4)	25.8 (78.4)	21.7 (71.1)	16.7 (62.1)	12.6 (54.7)	20.7 (69.2)
Daily mean °C (°F)	8.5 (47.3)	8.9 (48.0)	11.4 (52.5)	14.7 (58.5)	19.4 (66.9)	23.9 (75.0)	26.4 (79.5)	26.4 (79.5)	21.8 (71.2)	17.9 (64.2)	13.5 (56.3)	9.6 (49.3)	16.9 (62.4)
Mean daily minimum °C (°F)	5.5 (41.9)	5.6 (42.1)	7.7 (45.9)	10.6 (51.1)	15.0 (59.0)	19.5 (67.1)	22.0 (71.6)	22.0 (71.6)	17.8 (64.0)	14.1 (57.4)	10.2 (50.4)	6.7 (44.1)	13.1 (55.5)
Average precipitation mm (inches)	63.7 (2.51)	49.5 (1.95)	58.6 (2.31)	53.2 (2.09)	42.0 (1.65)	38.2 (1.50)	22.6 (0.89)	26.4 (1.04)	60.2 (2.37)	66.3 (2.61)	76.4 (3.01)	70.3 (2.77)	627.4 (24.7)
Source: Istituto Superiore per la Protezione e la Ricerca Ambientale
