= Spinazzola =

Spinazzola Spenazzòle
- Comune
- Comune di Spinazzola
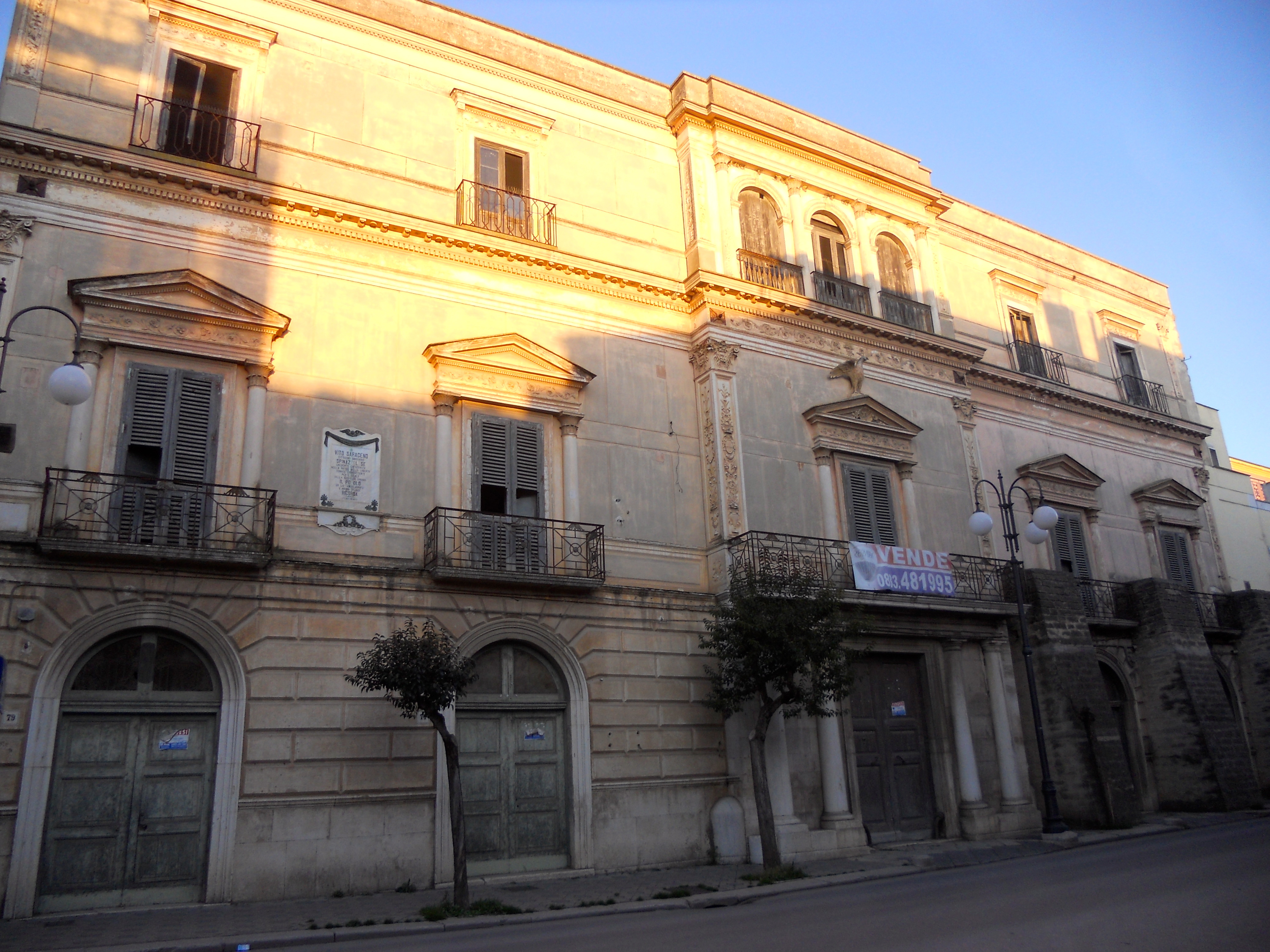
- Palazzo Saraceno.

- Coat of arms

- Location within Italy Location within Apulia
- Coordinates: 40°58′N 16°05′E
- Country: Italy
- Region: Apulia
- Province: Barletta-Andria-Trani

Government
  - Mayor: Michele Patruno

Area
  - Total: 184.01 km^{2} (71.05 sq mi)
- Elevation: 435 m (1,427 ft)

Population (31 December 2017)
  - Total: 6,515
  - Density: 35.41/km^{2} (91.70/sq mi)
- Demonym: Spinazzolesi
- Time zone: UTC+1 (CET)
  - Summer (DST): UTC+2 (CEST)
- Postal code: 76014
- Patron saint: Saint Sebastian
- Saint day: January 20
- Website: Official website

Spinazzola (Barese: Spenazzòle) is a town and comune (municipality) in the province of Barletta-Andria-Trani, Apulia, southern Italy. Spinazzola had a population of 6,515 as of December 31 2017. Spinazzola is approximately 70km away from Bari.

== People ==
- Pope Innocent XII was born here in the castle of the Pignatelli family, now destroyed.
- Michele Ruggieri (1543–1607), Jesuit missionary in China, first European sinologist, was born in Spinazzola.

== Twin cities ==
- Verbania, Italy
