= Noicattaro =

Noicattaro Naòie (Neapolitan)
- Comune
- Comune di Noicattaro
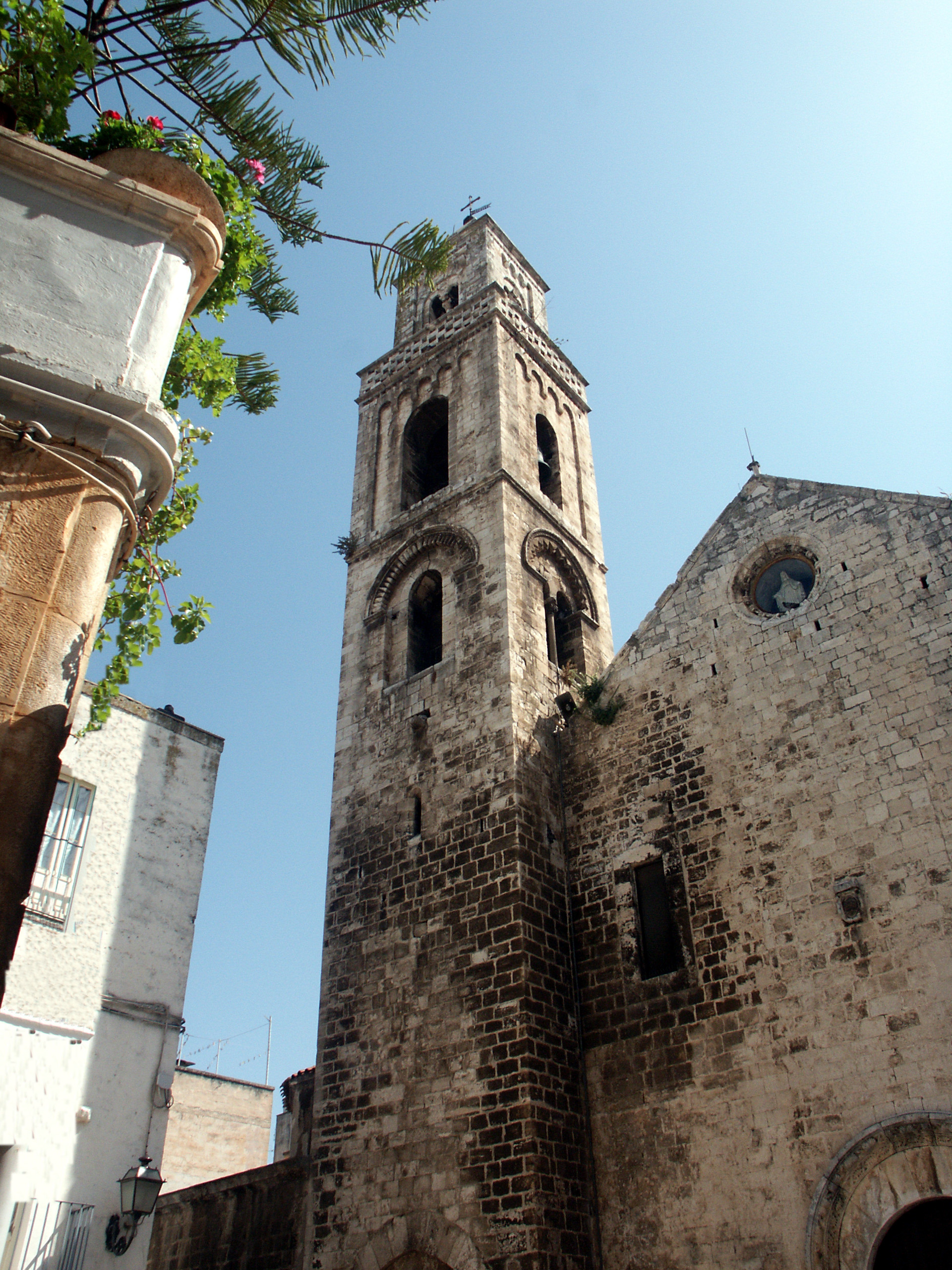
- Church of Noicattaro, with bell-tower

- Location within Italy Location within Apulia
- Coordinates: 41°2′N 16°59′E
- Country: Italy
- Region: Apulia
- Metropolitan city: Bari (BA)
- Frazioni: Parchitello, Scizzo, Città Giardino, Borgo Regina, Le Marine, Poggioallegro, Poggetto

Government
  - Mayor: Raimondo Innamorato

Area
  - Total: 41 km^{2} (16 sq mi)
- Elevation: 99 m (325 ft)

Population (31-07-2025)
  - Total: 25,742
  - Density: 630/km^{2} (1,600/sq mi)
- Demonym: Nojani
- Time zone: UTC+1 (CET)
  - Summer (DST): UTC+2 (CEST)
- Postal code: 70016
- Dialing code: 080-478 or 479
- Patron saint: Madonna del Carmine
- Saint day: Sunday after 16 July
- Website: Official website

Noicattaro (Italian: [noiˈkattaro]; Barese: Naòie; known as Noja until 1862) is a town and comune (municipality) in the Metropolitan City of Bari and region of Apulia, southern Italy.

The Mother Church (Chiesa Madre) dates to the 12th–13th centuries and is built in Apulian-Romanesque style. The town is also home to several Baroque churches, such as the Chiesa del Carmine and Madonna della Lama.

== Sport ==
=== Baseball and softball ===
Since 1971, Baseball Club Bari Warriors, the historic baseball and softball society has played in the different national baseball championships to the B League, for softball up to the A2 League. Currently the team is engaged in youth activities at schools and in the national C League baseball championship.
