= Palo del Colle =

- Comune
- Comune di Palo del Colle
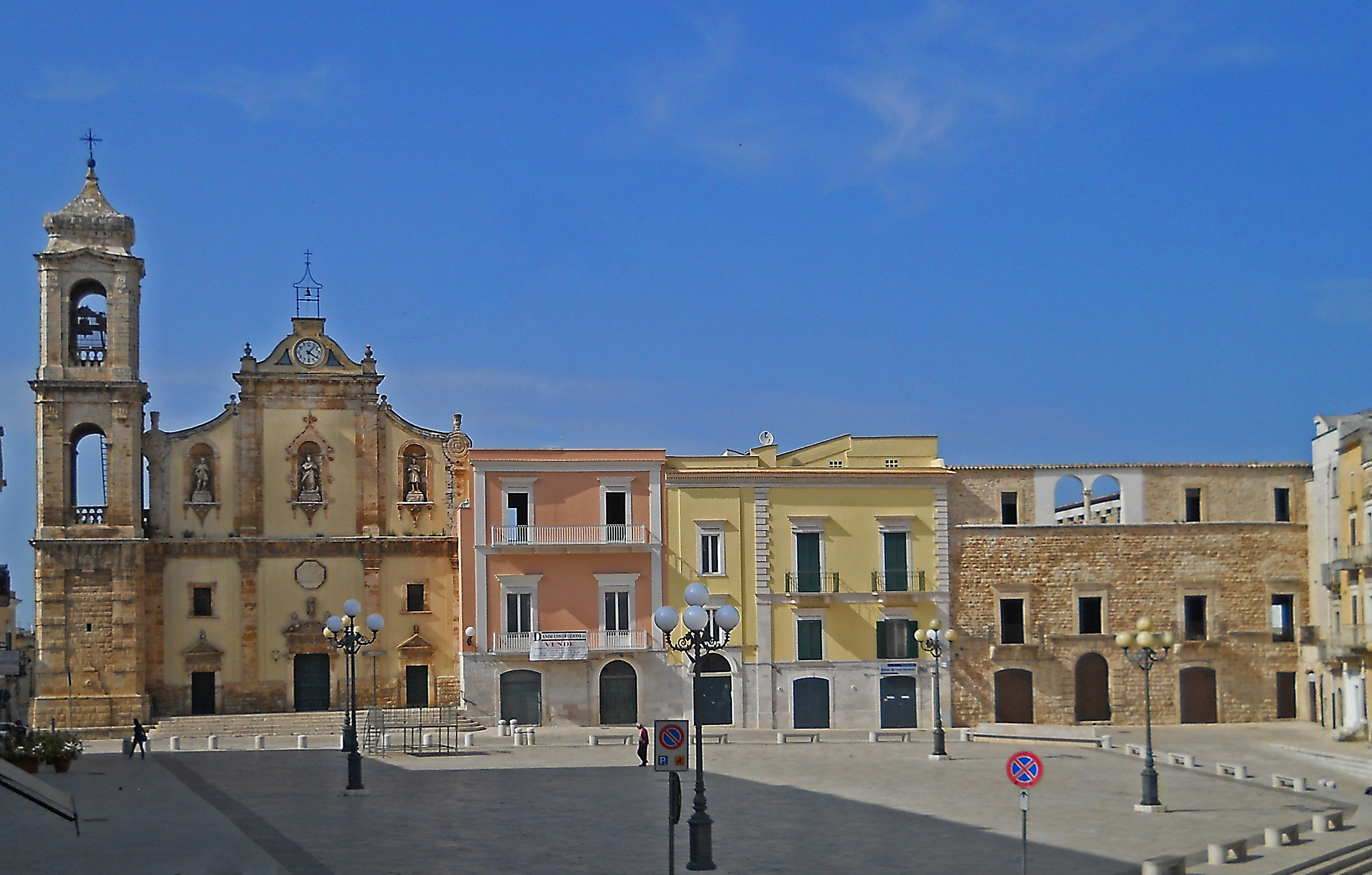

- Location within Italy Location within Apulia
- Coordinates: 41°3′N 16°42′E
- Country: Italy
- Region: Apulia
- Metropolitan city: Bari (BA)
- Frazioni: Auricarro

Government
  - Mayor: Tommaso Amendolara (Partito Democratico)

Area
  - Total: 79 km^{2} (31 sq mi)
- Elevation: 151 m (495 ft)

Population (31 March 2018)
  - Total: 21,451
  - Density: 270/km^{2} (700/sq mi)
- Demonym: Palesi
- Time zone: UTC+1 (CET)
  - Summer (DST): UTC+2 (CEST)
- Postal code: 70027
- Dialing code: 080
- Patron saint: Holy Crucifix
- Saint day: 16 September
- Website: Official website

Palo del Colle (Palese: Pàle) is a town and comune in the Metropolitan City of Bari, Apulia, southern Italy. The town of Palo del Colle is about 15 kilometres (9 mi) inland from the city of Bari. It is on a hill (hence the name "Pole on the Hill").
