= Capurso =

- Comune
- Comune di Capurso
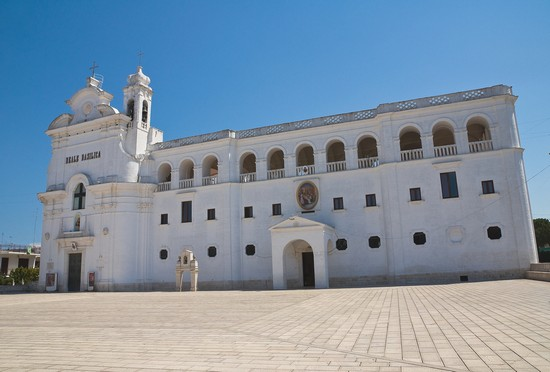
- Basilica della madonna del pozzo Esterno

- Coat of arms

- Location within Italy Location within Apulia
- Coordinates: 41°3′N 16°55′E
- Country: Italy
- Region: Apulia
- Metropolitan city: Bari (BA)

Government
  - Mayor: Michele Laricchia

Area
  - Total: 14 km^{2} (5.4 sq mi)
- Elevation: 72 m (236 ft)

Population (31 july 2025)
  - Total: 15,685
  - Density: 1,100/km^{2} (2,900/sq mi)
- Demonym: Capursesi
- Time zone: UTC+1 (CET)
  - Summer (DST): UTC+2 (CEST)
- Postal code: 70010
- Dialing code: 080
- Patron saint: San Giuseppe
- Website: Official website

Capurso (Barese: Capùrse) is a town and comune of around 15,000 inhabitants in the Metropolitan City of Bari, Apulia, Italy, located about 6 kilometres (4 mi) southeast of the capital. Capurso has many places to visit, for example the local church named Madonna del Pozzo.

== Twin towns ==
- (United States) Schiller Park, USA, since 1994
