= Terlizzi =

- Comune
- Comune di Terlizzi
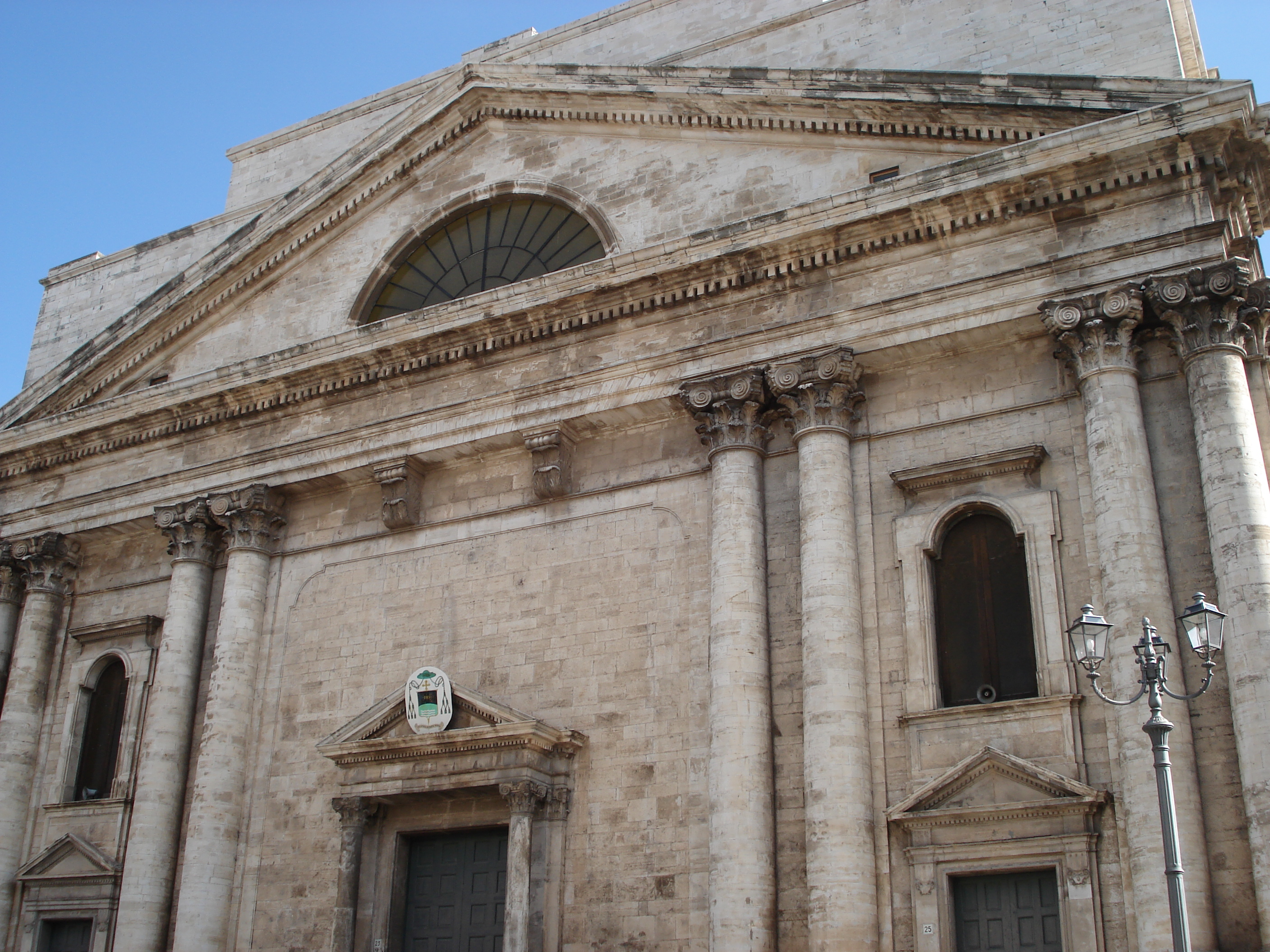
- Terlizzi's Cathedral (Concattedrale di San Michele Arcangelo)

- Coat of arms

- Location within Italy Location within Apulia
- Coordinates: 41°08′N 16°33′E
- Country: Italy
- Region: Apulia
- Metropolitan city: Bari (BA)
- Frazioni: Sovereto

Government
  - Mayor: Michelangelo De Chirico (PD)

Area
  - Total: 69.23 km^{2} (26.73 sq mi)
- Elevation: 191 m (627 ft)

Population (1 January 2016)
  - Total: 26,983
  - Density: 389.8/km^{2} (1,009/sq mi)
- Demonym: Terlizzesi
- Time zone: UTC+1 (CET)
  - Summer (DST): UTC+2 (CEST)
- Postal code: 70038
- Dialing code: 080
- Patron saint: Madonna of Sovereto
- Saint day: April 23
- Website: Official website

Terlizzi (Barese: Terrèzz) is an Italian small town of 26,084 inhabitants in the Metropolitan City of Bari in Apulia, lying to the north west of the seaport of Bari on the Adriatic Sea, in the midst of a fertile plain.

== History ==
Terlizzi is first mentioned in an 8th-century AD document, when its Lombard possessor donated the area to the Abbey of Montecassino. After the Byzantine domination, from the 11th century Terlizzi was under the influence of the counts of Giovinazzo, whose member Amico fortified both the cities. Later it was ruled by the Tuzziaco, Wrunfort, Orsini di Taranto and Grimaldi families. The oldest map of Terlizzi still hangs in the Palace at Monte Carlo of the latter's house.

It became a commune after the Unification of Italy in 1861, when it had 18,000 inhabitants.

== Main sights ==
It had a castle which at one time was very strong, and occasionally resorted to by the Emperor Frederick II, and later by the Aragonese sovereigns of Naples. Its remains include a 31-metre (102 ft) high clock tower in the center of town that was built by the Norman conquerors in the 12th century AD. The back-lit clock on that tower is the second largest in Europe after Big Ben.

The Co-Cathedral of San Michele Arcangelo was built in Neo-Classicist style in the 18th and 19th centuries, replacing the old Romanesque Duomo of the 13th century. It houses several canvasses and a notable collection of wooden statues.

The walls and towers of the town remain, but the fosse was turned into boulevards.

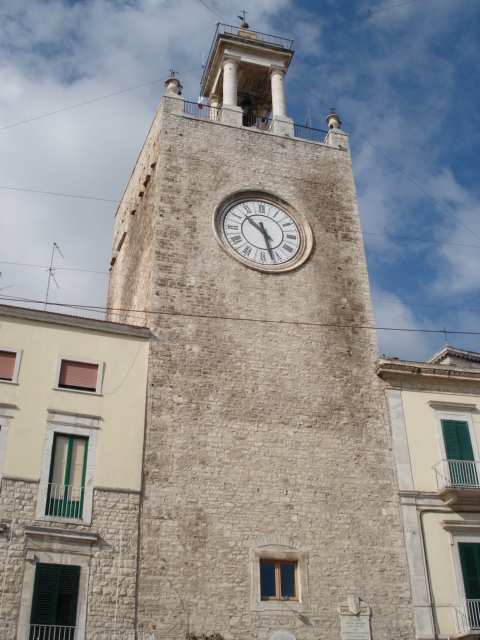
The Norman medieval tower, built in 1075, in the principal square of the town, Piazza Cavour.

In 1745, a fine Greek-made inkstand inlaid in silver was found in a nearby, ancient cove, in Suberito (at now, Sovereto). Starting from that date, was built a 22-metre (72 ft) tall triumphal wagon to keep the picture in Terlizzi's streets.

One of the last remaining stretches of the Appian Way that is still unpaved runs through the outskirts of Terlizzi. This stretch of the Appian Way is part of the Via Appia Traiana, built by Emperor Trajan sometime around 115 AD. Just off this road, 1 kilometre (0.6 miles) out of the town, is the church of Santa Maria di Cesano, built in 1055 AD. It houses a precious Byzantine fresco of Christ Pantocrator. In the centre of the city is notable the big Palace built by the Barons de Gemmis, with the annexed church of Santa Maria La Nova. It is from the 18th century and was designed by the architect Luigi Vanvitelli.

== People ==
- Ferrante de Gemmis, writer
- Gennaro de Gemmis, writer from the same family
- Nichi Vendola, Governor of Apulia from 2005
- Michele de Napoli, painter
- Giuseppe Millico (1739–1802), castrato contemporary of Farinelli
- Dionigi "Tony" Catalano (1921–2011)
- Felipe Posada Di Terlizzi (1999–present)
- Ilaria De Pinto (1983–present) Angel
