= Barese dialect =

Dialect of Neapolitan spoken in Bari, Apulia

Barese
- Dialètte apulo-lucano
- Pronunciation: IPA: [baˈreːsə]
- Native to: Italy
- Region: Apulia, Basilicata
- Language family: Indo-European: Italic; Latino-Faliscan; Latin; Romance; Italo-Western; Italo-Dalmatian; Italo-Romance; Neapolitan; Apulian; Barese
- Writing system: Latin (Italian alphabet)

Official status
- Regulated by: Centro Studi Baresi

Language codes
- ISO 639-3: –
- Glottolog: None

Barese dialect (natively dialètte barése; Italian: dialetto barese) is an Italo-Romance dialect belonging to the "southern intermediate" group (or Neapolitan), spoken in the regions of Apulia and Basilicata. Influences include Messapian, Oscan, Greek, Spanish, Old French, Franco-Provençal and Arabic, creating one of the most distinct Italian dialects both phonetically and lexically.

== Region ==
Assigning local dialects to strict geographical areas is often problematic. Regardless, the Bari dialect is used predominantly within the province of Bari in central Apulia, and in the province of Barletta-Andria-Trani. It is also spoken in the western part of the province of Taranto, in some towns in the western part of the province of Brindisi and in the north eastern part of the Basilicata region. In the north of the Apulian region, the province of Foggia, the Foggian dialect is spoken and may be seen as a variant of the Bari dialect, although significantly influenced by Neapolitan dialects, while in the city of Taranto the Tarantino dialect is spoken, which is quite similar to the Bari dialect.

In the Italian cinema of the Commedia all'Italiana, Barese has been made famous by actors such as Lino Banfi, Sergio Rubini, Gianni Ciardo, Dino Abbrescia, and Emilio Solfrizzi. There are also numerous films shot exclusively in Bari dialect: amongst the most notable is LaCapaGira which was admired by film critics at the Berlin International Film Festival. Many local theatre companies produce light comedy shows in dialect, often focusing on the comic linguistic opportunities presented by the millions who left the region during the 20th century in search of work in northern Italy and overseas.

== Extracts in city Barese ==
The Lord's Prayer

Attàne Nèste,
ca sta 'ngile,
sandificàte jè u nome tuje,
venghe à nú u Régne tuje,
sèmbe che lla volondà tóje,
come 'ngile acchessí 'ndèrre.
Annúscece josce u pane nèste de tutte le di,
é llívece à nnú le díbete nèste,
come nú le levàme à ll'alde,
é nnon z'inducénne à nnú 'ntendazióne,
ma líbberace d'o' male,
Amen.

The Hail Mary

Ave Maríe,
chiéne de gràzzie,
u Segnore jè cche tté.
Tu ssi benedétte 'nmènze à lle fémmene,
é benedétte jè u frutte
d'u vèndre tuje, Gesú.
Sanda Maríe, madre de Ddie,
prighe pe' nnú peccatóre,
josce é 'nd'à ll'ore de la morta nèste,
Amen.

The Salve Regina

Salve o' Reggine
matre de misericòrdie vita, dulgézze, spirànze nostre
salve, à tté recurràme, figghie d'Èva
à tté suspiràme, chiangénne,
'nd'à 'sta valle de lacreme, alló avvocàte
nostre chiamínde à nnú cche ll'ècchie tuje
misericordióse,
é ffamme vide dope 'stu esílie, Gesú,
u frutte bènedétte d'u séne tuje.
O clèmènde, bone
o dulge Vérgene Maríe.

The Angel of God

Àngele de Ddie
ca si u custòde mije,
allucíneme, custodísceme, tineme é
gguvèrneme
ca te venibbe date da lla piètà celèste,
Amen.

== Extracts from variants of cities in the Murgia hinterland (Gravinese and Ruvestine) ==
=== Preghìre de la not - Night prayer (gravinese) ===
Mcolc e madurmesc
sus o Cil s dscn tre mess,
ci Di' mprvides l'anmamì nans prdes
A captl du litt mi ste la presenz di Di',
alt ste la Santissm Trinitè,
dal pit la Mari Maddaln rispon pn'abella vousc
acimc u Segn d Sant Crousc.

Prayers written according to the rules of the Seminar for studies and in-depth study of the Bari dialect of the Ancient World and Modern Times. The last prayer is written according to the oral tradition handed down in Gravina in Puglia.

=== Attòn nuostǝ - Holy Father (ruvestine) ===
Attòn nuostǝ
ca stè n-cìdd,
sandǝfkòtǝ u nàume tìuǝ
vìannǝ u Règnǝ tìuǝ,
ca vènǝ fattǝ la vòlùndǫ tìuǝ,
kòm in-dala kìis aksǝi n-dìàrǝ.
Dàš òšǝ r pònǝ nuostǝ dǝ tuttǝ r dèi.
e lìvǝ r peccòtǝ nuostǝ,
kòm nìuǝ r levòmǝ a ll'aldǝ
e nan-ge sì mìttǝ a r provǝ,
ma šànzǝcǝ dù mòlǝ,
Amen.

Note: ǝ (e mute) š (sc), č (ch), ň (gn), ų semivowel, k (hard c)

Prayer written according to the studies of the expert of local history and local languages, the ruvestine Angelo Tedone

== Orthography ==
=== Alphabet ===
The Barese alphabet comprises the following letters:

a b c d e f g h i j k l m n o p q r s t u v z

=== Accents ===
In Barese the use of the accents is obligatory:

- acute accent, used when stressed vowels have a closed sound: é, í, ó, ú;
- grave accent, used when stressed vowels have an open sound: à, è, ò;

The monosyllables do not need to be accented, with some notable exceptions, such as à (preposition), é (conjunction), mè (adverb), and some others.

Examples:

- Mo me n'i à scí! – Now I have to go!;
- Quànte si sscéme – What an idiot you are;
- Ué! - Hi!/Hello!;
- Ce ssi tè-tè! – You are an idiot! / You talk too much!
- Ce ttremóne! – What a wanker! (similar to pirla in the dialect of Milan)

The accents are important and are often used to show the differences between words that are otherwise written in the same way, but which have different pronunciations. Examples:

- mé ("me": personal pronoun, complement, unstressed form) and mè ("(n)ever": time adverb);
- nu ("a(n)": indefinite article, masculine singular) and nú ("we", personal pronoun, subject);
- pésce ("fish") and pèsce ("worse");
- ué ("hi", "hello") and uè ("you want").

== Linguistic features ==
Within the Province of Bari and surroundings many dialects exist which, while similar to Bari dialect, have various vocal differences. For example, the expression Che c'è? in standard Italian, meaning "What's the matter?" or "What's up?" is variously produced as:

- Ci jè? in Barese;
- Ciobbà? in Andriese;
- Ce jè? in Bitettese;
- Ce d'è? in Grumese, Palese, Molfettese and Ruvese;
- Ce jèi? in Bitontino;
- Ce da? in Terlizzese;
- Ci jò? in Barlettano.

Meanwhile, the conjugation of verbs sees changes such as:

Essere ("to be" in standard Italian)

Person	io	tu	lui	noi	voi	loro
Indicative
Present	sono	sei	è	siamo	siete	sono

Essere ("to be" in Barese)

Person	ji	tu	jidde/jédde	nú	vú	lore
Indicative
Present	so	si	jè	sime	site	so'/sonde (rare)

Fare ("to do" or "to make" in standard Italian)

Person	io	tu	lui	noi	voi	loro
Indicative
Present	faccio	fai	fa	facciamo	fate	fanno

Fare ("to do" or "to make" in Barese)

Person	ji	tu	jidde/jédde	nú	vú	lore
Indicative
Present	fazze	fasce	fasce	facíme	facíte	fáscene

Avere ("to have" in standard Italian)

Person	io	tu	lui	noi	voi	loro
Indicative
Present	ho	hai	ha	abbiamo	avete	hanno

Avé ("to have" or "to have to" in Barese)

Person	ji	tu	jidde/jédde	nú	vú	lore
Indicative
Present	agghiá	adda	java	amma	avita	avonne

== See also ==
- Tarantino dialect
- Neapolitan language
- Appendix:Barese Swadesh list
