= Modugno =

Modugno Medùgne (Neapolitan)
- Comune
- Comune di Modugno
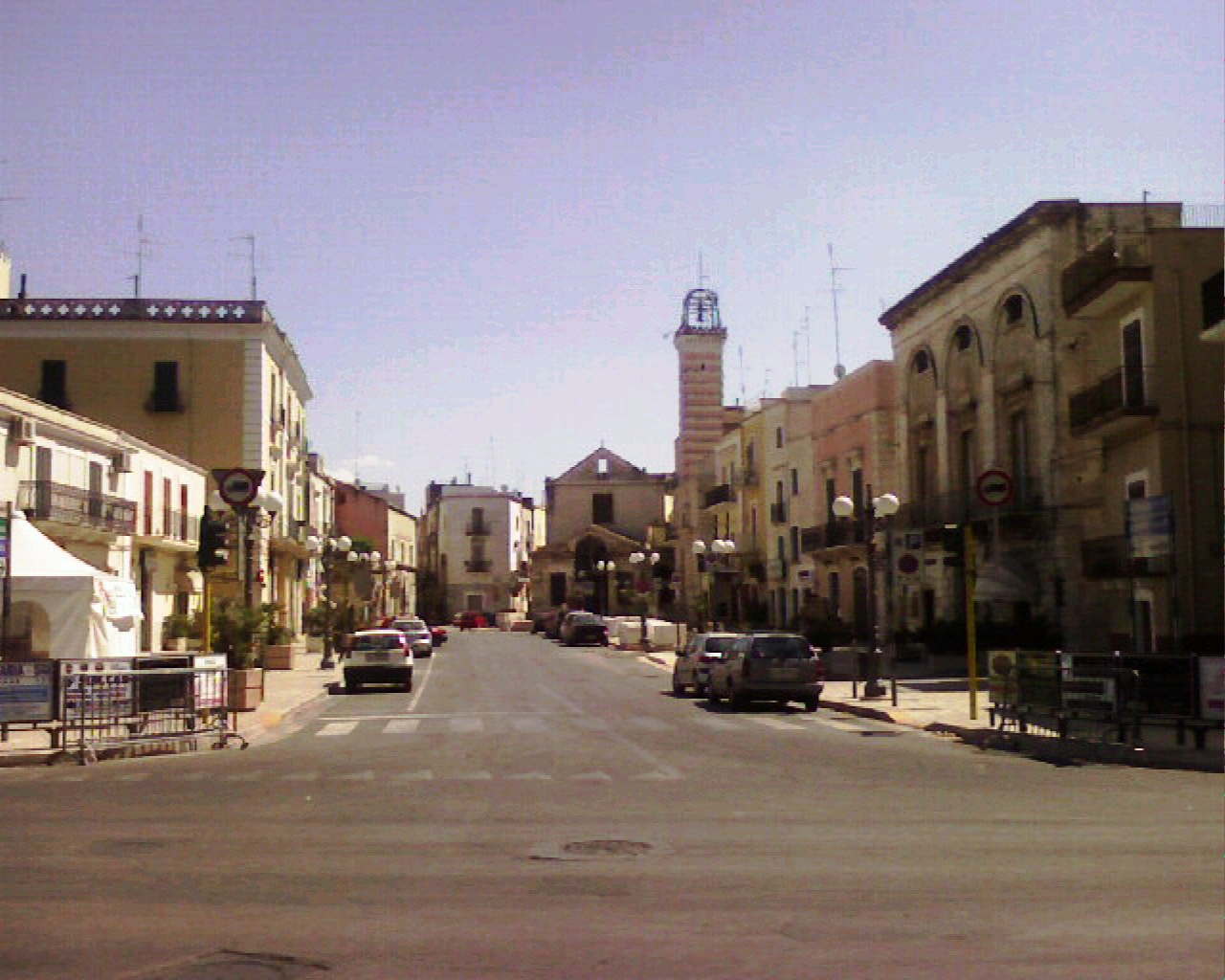
- Piazza of Modugno

- Coat of arms

- Location within Italy Location within Apulia
- Coordinates: 41°5′N 16°47′E
- Country: Italy
- Region: Apulia
- Metropolitan city: Bari (BA)
- Frazioni: Capo Scardicchio

Government
  - Mayor: Nicola Magrone

Area
  - Total: 319 km^{2} (123 sq mi)
- Elevation: 76 m (249 ft)

Population (30 September 2011)
  - Total: 39,017
  - Density: 122/km^{2} (317/sq mi)
- Demonym: Modugnesi
- Time zone: UTC+1 (CET)
  - Summer (DST): UTC+2 (CEST)
- Postal code: 70026
- Dialing code: 080
- ISTAT code: 072027
- Patron saint: St. Nicholas of Tolentino
- Saint day: 24 September
- Website: Official website

Modugno (Italian: [moˈduɲɲo]; Barese: Medùgne [məˈduɲɲə]) is a town and comune (municipality) of the Metropolitan City of Bari, Apulia, southern Italy. It borders the municipalities of Bari, Bitetto, Bitonto, Bitritto, and Palo del Colle.

Before the 1970s, the town was mainly dedicated to agriculture; since construction of an industrial zone, it has become an important factory site in the region. Modugno is 5 kilometres (3 mi) from the shore. The landscape is mainly flat.

== History ==
The history of Modugno, an Italian municipality located in the Land of Bari, originates from prehistoric times. The present urban core was probably founded in the Early Middle Ages, in the Byzantine period. In the 11th and 12th centuries it was part of the fief granted to the archbishops of Bari and was subjected to Norman and Swabian rule. In the Angevin period it was partially destroyed and then rebuilt. In the second half of the 14th century, it was a fief under the rule of the Aragonese kings who created a duchy, with the nearby towns of Palo del Colle and Bari, which they granted to the Sforza family. During the time it was a Sforza duchy (and especially during the rule of Isabella of Aragon and Bona Sforza), Modugno experienced a period of economic and demographic development. With the subsequent Spanish rule, there was a rapid decline. During this period, however, the city of Modugno freed itself from feudal rule through the payment of a fee, demonstrating its pride. Freedom from the feudal system lasted from 1582 to 1666, when the municipal administration declared bankruptcy due to an economic crisis that continued during the subsequent Austrian and Spanish rule. The French Revolution also made its effects felt in southern Italy, and Modugno was besieged by a horde of Sanfedists. For a decade, a pro-Napoleonic government was established, after which the Bourbon kingdom was restored and remained in place until the Unification of Italy. Since World War II, Modugno experienced rapid population growth and a transformation from an agricultural to an industrial economy.

== Human settlements in the municipal territory before the founding of the city ==
=== Prehistoric period ===
Available archaeological evidence allows us to establish that the municipal territory of Modugno was inhabited since prehistoric times. In fact, archaeological research dating back to the 1980s unearthed a Neolithic village dating back to the 6th-5th millennia BC, located on a hill overlooking Lama Lamasinata, in the vicinity of the hamlet of Balsignano, southeast in the municipal territory, in the direction of Bitritto. The archaeological site, datable from the seventh to fifth millennium BC, is characterized by two large housing structures, about twenty meters apart, along with areas intended for functional activities with industries typical of Neolithic communities devoted to cereal growing. A third structure, bordered by a stone fence, is located further upstream and dates instead to the end of the fifth millennium BC. There are also three pit burials, with human remains but without grave goods.

On the other hand, the remains of a Peucetian necropolis dating back to the 7th-6th centuries B.C., found in the eastern part of the municipal territory, in Contrada Cappuccini and in Via Carducci, in the direction of the Carbonara di Bari district, date back to the Metal Age.

=== Roman period ===
In the 3rd century B.C., the Romanization of the territory of central Apulia entailed the decline of the pre-existing Peucetian centers: the Modugnese territory was divided into landed estates organized according to the centuriation system. Traces can still be found of the gromatic cippi, used to demarcate the boundaries between the various properties: the so-called menhirs, which originally numbered nine, the best known of which is called "The Monk."

The present town of Modugno was established on the border between the Ager Butuntinus and the Ager Varinus. This fact would be the origin of the name of the town of Modugno: in fact, according to the most credited hypothesis, the name Modugno would derive from the term "Medunium," or "in the middle," halfway between Bitonto and Bari.

In the Roman period, the decline of urban settlements in central Apulia was accompanied by a development of the road network. The territory of Modugno, located in the Ager Varinus, was crossed in Roman times by the Via Minucia and, presumably, also by the Via Gellia (the exact route of which is uncertain) as well as, in the imperial and late antiquity, by the Via Traiana. In addition to the main road system, there is evidence of the existence of minor roads that probably traced the routes of the earlier roads of Peucetian origin. Some roads connected the Murgian hinterland with Butuntum and Barium by crossing the territories of today's Toritto and Palo del Colle.

Dating from the late Roman and early medieval period are the remains of a rural settlement, a small church and a burial ground found in the municipal territory of Modugno, along Lama Misciano, not far from the route of the Via Traiana (the archaeological area is located in an area now used for industrial activities).

=== Early medieval period ===
With the fall of the Western Roman Empire, Apulia was ravaged by a series of wars involving Byzantines, Ostrogoths, Lombards and Saracens. This caused the depopulation of towns in favor of small rural settlements that took two different but coexisting forms: the rupestrian settlement and the fortified hamlet. In Modugno there are prominent examples of both types of early medieval rural settlements.

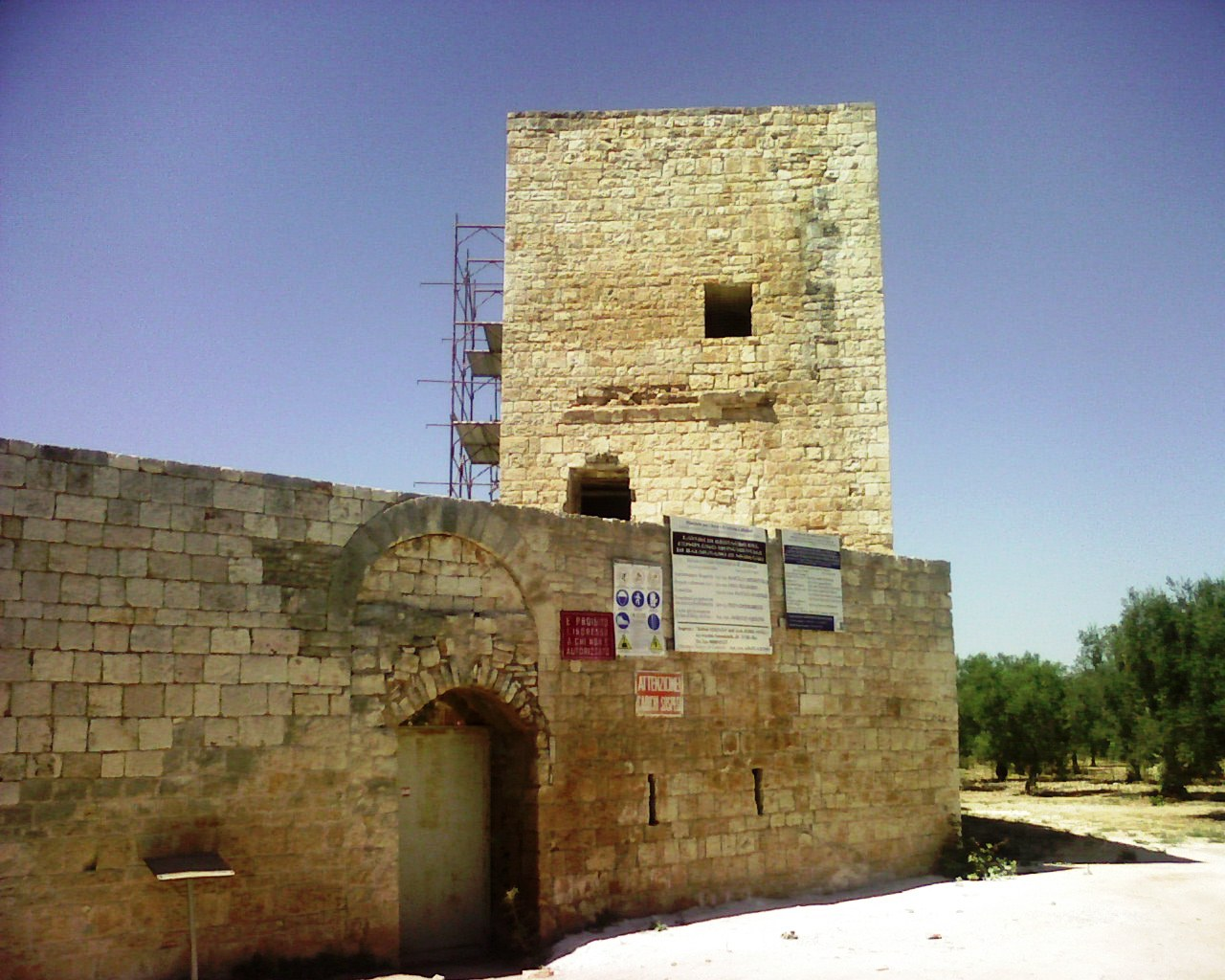
The fortified hamlet of Balsignano

Among the rock settlements that characterized the territory of Apulia and Basilicata in the early medieval age, outside the town of Modugno, along the course of Lama Lamasinata, are the rupestrian settlement of Santa Maria della grotta and the hypogeum of Masseria Madia Diana (in the industrial area in the former Alco area). In particular, the abbey of Our Lady of the Cave hosted St. Conrad of Bavaria from 1139 until his death in 1155. The saint, who grew up in the Clairvaux Abbey left for Palestine during the First Crusade and, upon returning to Apulia, decided to live in the cave, leading an anchorite life.

As for early medieval fortified hamlets, an eminent example is the fortified center of Balsignano, which stands about three kilometers from the present-day town of Modugno. Balsignano, first mentioned in a document from the 10th century (when it was sacked by the Saracens who conquered the territories of Bari) and abandoned by the 16th century, preserves the enclosure made of dry stone, a two-level building with two towers with a rectangular base, the courtyard with the church of Santa Maria di Costantinopoli and, outside, the church of San Felice in Balsignano, a fine example of a single-nave church with a central dome in the axis of the Byzantine tradition (10th century).

== Early core of the city of Modugno ==
It is widely believed that Modugno was founded during the period of Byzantine rule, but the certainty of its existence comes only from 1021. In fact, the first known document mentioning Modugno dates back to May of that year: it is a contract by which a certain Traccoguda “de loco Medunio” lent eight soldi to Giovanni and Mele of Bitetto, receiving as a pledge a vineyard that was located “in ipso loco Medunio,” along the road that connected Modugno to Bitetto.

In 1025 the town was named among the bishoprics in a papal bull of John XIX. Later, it was also named in the bulls of Alexander II (1062) and Urban II (1089), which also mention Modugno as a suffragan bishopric of Bari. While the city in 1025 was already a center worthy of being elected as an episcopal see, it is conceivable that the first settlement was established at least two or three centuries earlier. As a reminder of the ancient episcopal dignity, Modugno retains the privilege of being able to celebrate solemn Mass with a rite - called the nine-priest Mass - which requires, according to the Greek pontifical tradition, the presence of six priests, the celebrant and two ministers. With the Norman conquest Modugno lost its title of bishopric and, in a bull of Alexander III in 1172, it is mentioned among the towns belonging to the jurisdiction of the diocese of Bari.

=== Location of the ancient settlement ===
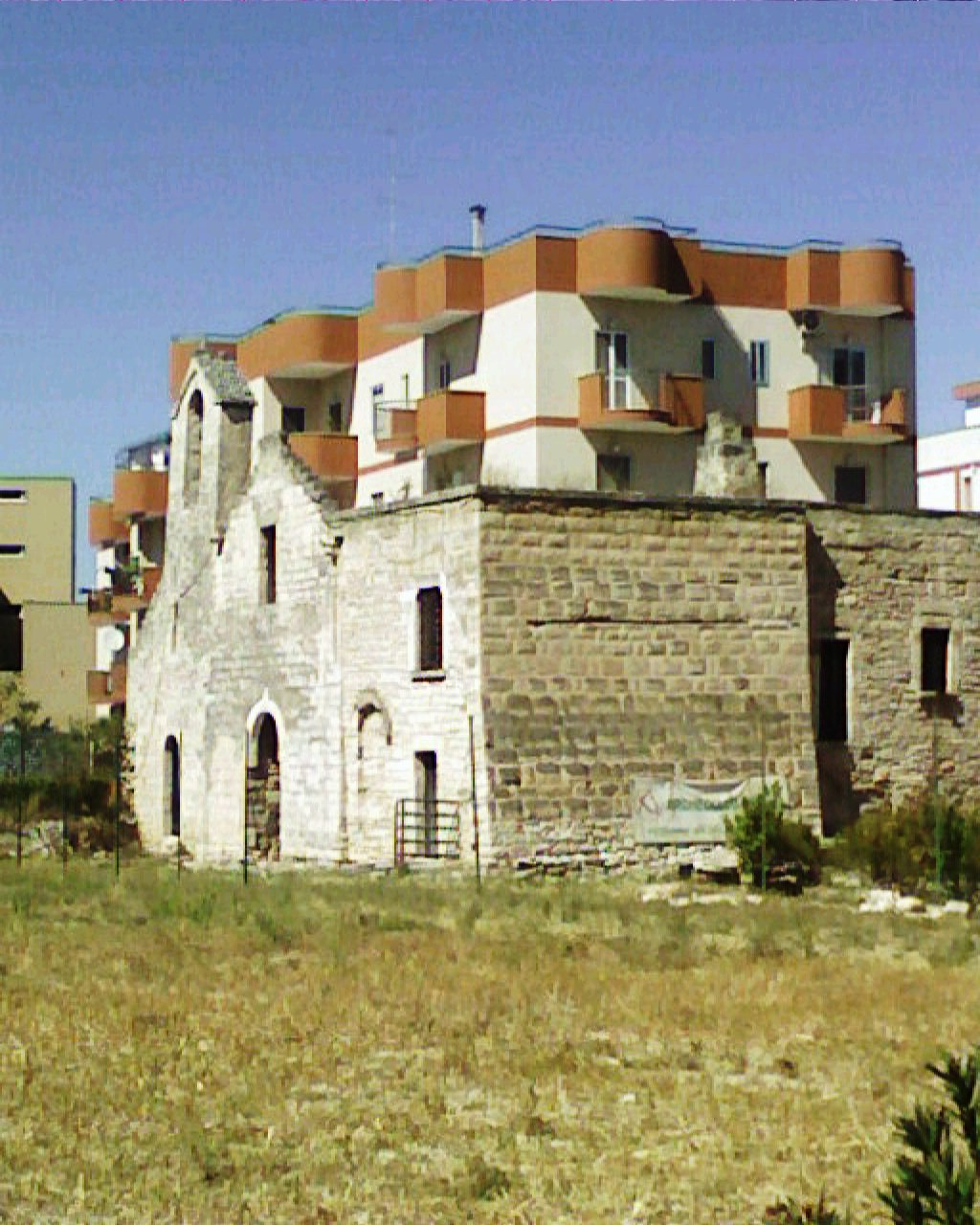
The church of Santa Maria di Modugno. The first nucleus of the town of Modugno developed around this church.

It is commonly believed that the first nucleus of the ancient town of Modugno arose around the church of Santa Maria di Modugno, dedicated to the Virgin of the Assumption. Confirmation of this hypothesis would come from the discovery, during excavations in the area in 1968, of some Byzantine coins. This ancient village may have been destroyed during Saracen raids during the 9th century, although there are no documents to confirm this supposition. The inhabitants of the village escaped the massacres and capture by the Saracens and took refuge in the Motta castle, which was garrisoned by a Byzantine or Lombard garrison. A less accepted hypothesis on the etymological origin of the name of the town of Modugno is related to that of the Motta castle. In this case, “Metu-genus” or “Mottu-genus” would mean “sprung up on the slope.”

This settlement that arose around that castle was called "Midunium" and was small in size, at least until the first half of the 14th century: in fact, documents from this period indicate Modugno with names such as "Medunio castellum", "castro Medunio", "Medunio casalis" or "Locus Meduneum".

Around the year 1000, it was decided that the distant church of St. Mary of Modugno was no longer suitable for the needs of the community. Therefore, a new church dedicated to the Virgin Mary was built: the current Mother Church. It was restored in 1347 by Archbishop Bartolomeo Carafa and in the first decades of the 16th century by the Modugno chapter and with the contribution of Queen Bona Sforza. In the 17th century the church was expanded by incorporating the old building: the presbytery and the beginning of the nave almost certainly belong to the old structure.

== Norman principality (1071 - 1189) and Swabian reign (1194 - 1255) ==
=== The Norman period ===
Norman territories between 10th and 13th century

In the early 11th century Apulia was conquered by the Normans, who established the feudal system that persisted in southern Italy until 1806. Modugno was one of the few towns that freed itself from feudal serfdom, redeeming its freedom from the Spanish Crown in 1582.

From the time of the Norman conquest, the city was a fief of the Loffredi family. According to some sources it remained so until the death of William the Bad in 1166 (some documents mention Francesco Loffredi, Lord of Martina and Modugno, in the time of King Robert). According to other sources, however, Modugno was given as a feud to Ursone (or Orso,) bishop of Rapolla, by Robert Guiscard, in 1078, when he was transferred from Rapolla to Bari. After Robert Guiscard's death, Apulia was divided between his two sons Bohemond and Roger (Modugno became fief of his younger son).

=== The Hohenstaufen ===
Through the marriage of Henry VI to the last heiress of the Norman kingdom Constance I of Sicily, the Norman dynasty became extinct in the Swabian House of Hohenstaufen. Henry VI and Constance's son, Frederick II, granted Modugno as a fief to his advisor Berard of Castagna in 1212, who was elected archbishop of Bari in 1207. In 1214, at the request of Frederick II, Berard of Castagna was transferred by Pope Innocent III to Palermo, and Andrea III Testa was elected archbishop of Bari. The latter in 1223 took over the fiefdom.

Later Frederick II granted the lands of Bari to Robert Chyurlia. During the succession struggles for the Kingdom of Sicily between the Hohenstaufen and the Angevins called by Pope Urban IV, according to the historical chronicles of Nicola Trentadue junior, Modugno was among the Apulian cities that sided with Conradin of Swabia, but this possibility seems to be ruled out because at that time Modugno was a fief of the Chyurlia family, which sided with the House of Anjou.

== Angevin Kingdom (1266-1441) ==
When Charles of Anjou came to the throne, Modugno was ruled by Robert Chyurlia. The archbishop of Bari John VI asserted the ancient feudal rights of the archbishops of Bari over Modugno and, in 1269, regained the fief with the diploma “Instrumentum possessionis Medunei iuxta sententiam Caroli regis.” Upon the death of John VI in 1280, local barons took advantage of the power vacuum to take possession of the city: in 1281 Modugno was controlled by Marquis Francesco Loffredi, who took revenge on the people, who proved hostile, and the city “was greatly outraged by the usurpers.” In 1282 Pope Martin IV elected a new archbishop, Romualdo Grisone, who, failing to obtain the restitution of the territories he was entitled to, resorted to arms to conquer the fiefdoms of the bishopric.

=== Struggles between Angevins and Hungarians in the mid-14th century ===
In the mid-14th century, Apulia became a battleground for the contention of the Kingdom of Naples (following the revolt of the “Sicilian Vespers,” the French were driven out of the island, which was annexed to the Spanish kingdom of the Aragonese) between Louis I of Hungary and Joanna I of Naples.

At that time, the archbishop of Bari Bartolomeo Carafa was lord of Modugno, who, fearing Hungarian raids, had the town of Modugno fortified. The Hungarians, after razing the township of Auricarro, unsuccessfully attempting the siege of Palo del Colle and sacking Grumo, Toritto and Binetto, headed for Modugno, but its inhabitants had preferred to take refuge in Bari, despite the new walls built by Archbishop Bartolomeo Carafa. It is conceivable that the Hungarians went on a looting spree and set up camp in the town. The inhabitants of the nearby township of Balsignan warned the Hungarians of the approach of Joanna's troops. Assaulting them by surprise, the Hungarians repelled the advance of the enemies, who sought shelter in the castle of Loseto. The Hungarians returned to Modugno from where, in late August, they set out to besiege Bari with the participation of citizens of Ceglie del Campo. They were unsuccessful and headed for other cities. The Barese, taking advantage of the momentary absence of the Hungarians, counterattacked; they ravaged Ceglie and attacked Balsignano by imprisoning its leaders and placing a new governor there. This chaotic situation ended only in 1352 with the reconciliation between Louis I of Hungary and Joanna I of Naples, who had reconfirmed the throne.

=== Economic and demographic development from the second half of the 14th century ===
After Joanna's reign, Modugno was no longer a fief of the archbishops of Bari. It is not known with certainty which monarch took the fief from them and who was the last archbishop to own it, though it is supposed to have been Bartolomeo Carafa who in 1347 restored the main church of Modugno dedicated to Our Lady of the Assumption. Probably also because of this enfranchisement from feudal servitude to the bishopric of Bari, Modugno was struck by an interdict in 1383, by decision of Pope Urban VI, who had previously been archbishop of Bari.

From the second half of the 14th century Modugno experienced, probably for the first time in its history, social economic and demographic development. This development was due to the policies of the Angevins and the initiative of some merchants from northern Italy who settled in the province of the Land of Bari using it as a trading base to produce agricultural products and export them to the Republic of Venice through the port of Bari. Also, around the same time, the hamlet of Balsignano had its final decline, so many of its inhabitants moved to Modugno increasing its resident population.

== Aragonese Kingdom (1442 - 1501) ==
=== Under the prince of Taranto Orsini del Balzo ===
At the beginning of the 15th century Modugno depended on the Governor of Bari and was so until 1440 when it came into the possession of Giovanni Antonio Orsini Del Balzo, prince of Taranto. In the first half of the 15th century, the Aragonese undertook the conquest of the Kingdom of Naples starting from Sicily. In Apulia, the contention saw the prince of Taranto Giovanni Antonio Orsini Del Balzo on the side of the Aragonese and the condottiero Giacomo Caldora appointed by the Angevins as feudal lord of Bari and Bitonto. Giacomo Caldora laid siege to Modugno in late August 1436, with his son-in-law Count of Avellino Troiano Caracciolo, but was unsuccessful and contented himself with ravaging olive and almond groves in the surrounding compaigns. Clashes and retaliation between the towns that sided with the two factions ended only when Alfonso of Aragon succeeded in seizing the throne of Naples in 1442 with the help of Filippo Maria Visconti. Alfonso of Aragon reconfirmed to the loyal prince of Taranto all the possessions he had won in the struggles that had just ended: Modugno was the fief of Gian Antonio Orsini and remained so for thirteen years, hated by the population for his tyrannical actions.

The Orsini and the Duke of Milan Francesco Sforza also supported the Aragonese monarch during the Conspiracy of the Barons who wanted the return of the Angevins. King Ferdinand I rewarded the former with the reconfirmation in 1462 of all his possessions, including the fief of Modugno, and consolidated the alliance with the Duke of Milan, initiating a marriage policy.

Upon the death of the prince of Taranto Gian Antonio Orsini, which occurred on November 13, 1463, in Altamura, his possessions, including Modugno, returned to the state property, that is, to the king of Naples. This freedom from the feudal yoke, though short-lived, would play an important role in the freedom claims that the Modugnese would enact in the following centuries. Ferdinand I met Modugno's ambassadors in Altamura a few days after Orsini's death and granted Modugno exemption from duties on oil exports and the Sunday market.

=== Concession of Modugno to the Sforzas ===
On June 19, 1464, King Ferdinand I of Naples proposed to Francesco Sforza the duchy of Bari and the two cities of Modugno and Palo del Colle, as a reward for his support in suppressing the conspiracy of the barons. Ferdinand I on 9 September 1464 issued the privilege of donation in which he stated that he had always considered “Sforza Maria Sforza among his dearest people and always loved and considered him as a son on a par with Eleonora, promised to him in his betrothal, both because of the bond of kinship and because of his singular character and the innumerable benefits received from his father Francesco [... ] He therefore gladly gives in perpetuity to him and to his legitimate heirs and successors of both sexes the city of Bari and the lands of Palo and Modugno with their castles, hamlets, men, vassals, vassals' incomes, feuds, feudatories, subfeudatories, customs, rights of the customs and any other right arising from the useful dominion, with the houses, estates, olive groves, vineyards, gardens, etc., with the court of justice for the recognition of civil cases and the other rights, jurisdictions, accounts, etc., pertaining by custom and law or otherwise to the said lands, and with the title of duchy..., agrees that Sforza Maria Sforza and his successors shall bear the title of duke of Bari in all deeds and writings, and shall enjoy the favors, liberties and honors of barons and dukes."

Before taking possession of the duchy, the Sforzas asked their representative in the kingdom of Naples, Antonio da Trezzo, to prepare a report regarding the economic situation and tax revenues of the new fiefdom of Bari, Modugno and Palo del Colle. In his letter of 14 January 1465, Antonio da Trezzo describes Modugno to the Sforza as "a large and important land, but [with] almost no revenue", that is, of little tax revenue for the duke. Although several hypotheses have been formulated, there are no documented reasons why a town like Modugno paid few taxes to the duke. In fact, Bari had tax revenues on oil production of about 6,000–7,000 ducats, while Palo del Colle had about 1,200 ducats, but at that time Modugno had a population far greater than that of Palo del Colle and about half that of Bari (Modugno was inhabited by 248 families, while Bari 582) as well as extensive olive groves.

After the Sforzas agreed to accept the Duchy of Bari, the ceremony of handing over the Duchy of Bari and the lands of Modugno and Palo to Sforza Maria Sforza, represented by Azzo Visconti, took place on October 12, 1465, in Bari, in the basilica of St. Nicholas.

Azzo Visconti was loved by the population and his government was fair and balanced: when he entrusted Domenico de Afflicti from Bari with the position of Captain of Modugno (the Captain was the representative of the local authority and was always a foreigner), the population made representations to Azzo about a dispute concerning the payment of collections, which was going on between Bari and Modugno. Visconti granted the request of the Modugnese and removed Domenico de Afflcti from office. Duke Sforza Maria Sforza praised his rectitude and loyalty to the House of Sforza and reappointed him to his role in 1467. When Azzo left office two years later, the Sforza appointed his son, Gaspare Visconti, as governor.

=== Development in the Aragonese period ===
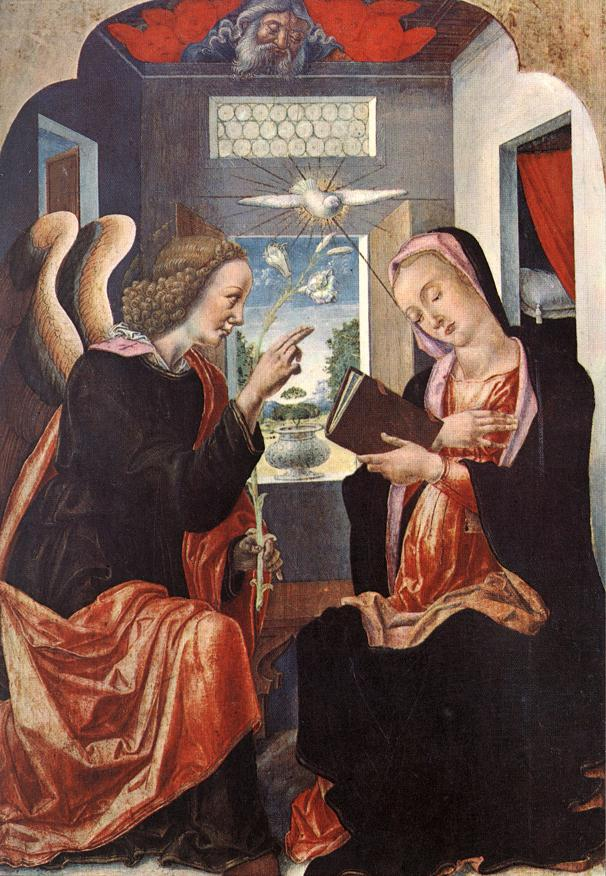
The altarpiece painted by the Venetian Bartolomeo Vivarini, dated 1472 and preserved in the church of Maria Santissima Annunziata in Modugno.

Between the 15th and 16th centuries, Modugno experienced a period of remarkable demographic and economic growth, transforming from a small fortified hamlet to a village with a population larger than Trani or Polignano a Mare. This growth, which characterized not only Modugno but also other inland villages was caused by a number of factors. Frequent attacks by Dalmatian and Turkish pirates on the Apulian coast pushed the population to seek shelter in the hinterland and in better defended towns. In addition, the period of peace that occurred in Apulia with the end of the struggles for succession to the throne of Naples and the rise of the Aragonese favored the resumption of trade and mercantile activities in nearby Bari and Bitonto, whose fairs were frequented by Florentine, Venetian, Lombard, and Genoese merchants who imported there mainly cloth and jewelry and exported oil, almonds, and wheat. Indirect evidence of Modugno's trade relations with Venetian merchants is the presence in the church of Maria Santissima Annunziata of an altarpiece by Venetian painter Bartolomeo Vivarini. The increased demand for grain and oil for export resulted in higher prices for the benefit of landowners who invested in new plantings of olive trees and an increased demand for farm laborers, as a result of which many families moved to Modugno to devote themselves to olive cultivation. During the same period, foreign aristocratic families moved to Modugno, quickly enriching themselves through trade, land ownership or services rendered to the Sforza and Aragon, and began to occupy prominent roles in the city administration.

This demographic and economic growth was accompanied by urban growth: before the 16th century, a new quarter was built around the church of St. John the Baptist, on the route from Bari to Bitonto; at the beginning of the 16th century, under the duchy of Isabella of Aragon Sforza and her daughter Bona, a “new suburb” was built. The wealthy families who had recently moved to Modugno preferred to build family palaces in a separate location, in the area facing the main gate of the town, the “Porta di Bari.” In this period, in the area facing the Porta di Bari were built the hall of the nobles, the Ancarano palace and the church of Santa Maria del Suffragio, seat since 1651 of the Confraternity of the Nobles. In nearby St. Augustine Street (today Count Rocco Stella Street) the palaces of Capitaneo, Maffei, Stella and Scarla were erected. At the same time, the old town square (today Piazza del Popolo) was occupied by new buildings.

== Sforza Duchy of Bari, Modugno and Palo del Colle (1465-1557) ==
=== Sforza Maria Sforza ===
In 1465 Sforza Maria, Francesco Sforza's third-born son, was invested with the duchy in view of his marriage to Eleonora of Aragon, the king's daughter, and with the consent of his father Francesco, who thus renounced his rights to the fiefs given to his son, including Modugno. Sforza Maria was the only Sforza to personally travel to the territories in his name during the Bari exile of 1477–1478.

=== Ludovico il Moro and Beatrice d'Este ===
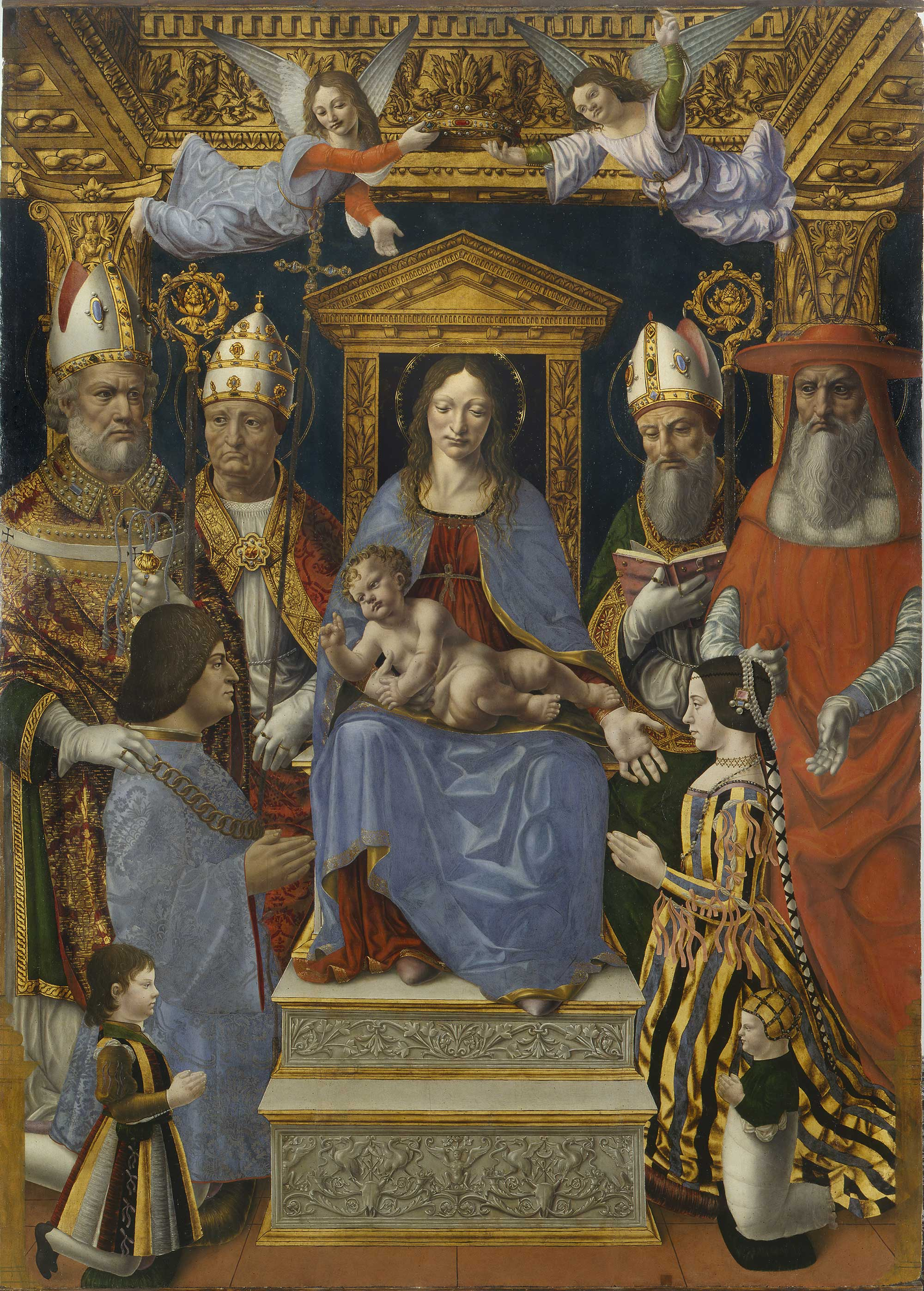
Ludovico il Moro and his wife Beatrice d'Este, dukes of Bari, in the Pala Sforzesca.

Sforza Maria died in 1479 without children, so by royal decree the duchy passed to his brother Ludovico il Moro, who entrusted it to various governors, including his sister Ippolita Maria Sforza. As early as the following year it was also named after his betrothed Beatrice d'Este, niece and adopted daughter of King Ferrante, by the will of his ancestor, who granted it to him in marriage. Upon Beatrice's death in 1497, Ludovico (by then duke of Milan) ceded the entire duchy of Bari to their second son Sforza Francesco, but the latter did not benefit from it until 1499, as due to the impending French invasion of the duchy of Milan and an unsuccessful political maneuvering by his father Ludovico, Modugno with the entire duchy of Bari was occupied by Isabella of Aragon, although Francesco continued to own it.

=== Duchess Isabella of Aragon (1501-1524) ===
She inherited the Duchy of Bari and managed its destiny with harmonious care and diligent intelligence, leaving one of the most grateful memories. In fact, she made trade, industry and art flourish there: in short, her duchy is linked to that brief period of rebirth that Bari experienced in the modern age.

— (Vito Masellis in “History of Bari,” Italian Edition, Bari 1965)

In 1500 Isabella of Aragon received the Duchy of Bari, Modugno and Palo del Colle from Ludovico il Moro, and several Lombard families, loyal to the duchess, followed her to Apulia. Other foreign families had already settled in the three cities of the duchy in the previous Sforza governments, either to engage in trade or to hold positions of power. Among the families who settled in Modugno during this period were the Cornale, Cesena, Capitaneo, and Scarli families. Isabella encouraged the integration of these new families with the local population by implementing a policy of promoting marriages.

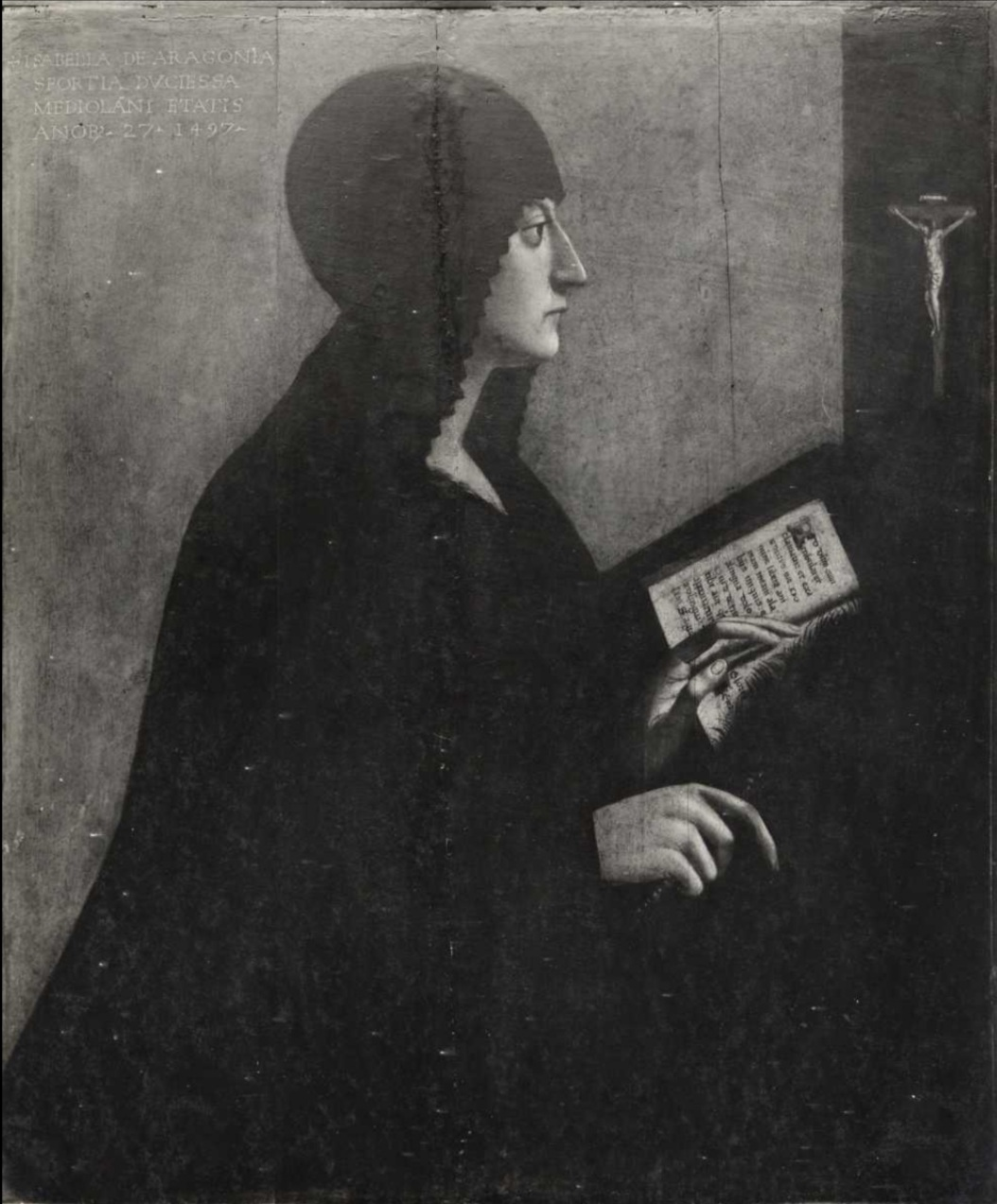
Isabella of Aragon

Isabella of Aragon introduced in her small duchy the spirit of renewal and the ability to invest in public works characteristic of the Duchy of Milan.

She loved to surround herself with artists and men of letters; she called the Modugnese writer Amedeo Cornale to court. The first book printed in Bari dates from this period (the work of Nicola Antonio Carmignano from 1535, now preserved in the Civic Museum of Bari).

During Isabella's duchy, on April 24, 1502, Spanish general Gonzalo de Córdoba confirmed the Fair of St. Peter Martyr to the land of Modugno.

Isabella's enlightened government was accompanied by an oppressive fiscal policy, promoted by her minister Giosuè De Ruggiero. Fiscal harshness was increased on the occasion of her daughter Bona Sforza's marriage to King Sigismund I the Old, which was celebrated with great pomp in Naples on December 6, 1517, and the festivities lasted ten days. For the dowry and expenses of the lavish wedding, the Chapter of Modugno contributed the sum of 300 ducats.

The citizens of Modugno also complained about the abuse of their archbishop Gian Antonio De Ruggiero (elected archbishop through the intercession of his powerful brother Giosuè) who took advantage of his position to enrich himself. The oppression continued even when Gian Antonio De Ruggiero became bishop of Ostuni in 1517 (in 1507 Isabella of Aragon had taken possession of that city's fiefdom in place of the two Calabrian towns of Burello and Rosarno) and retained the benefices of the Modugnese churches. The people, exasperated, wrote a letter in 1527 to Duchess Bona, who succeeded her mother Isabella, denouncing the situation in very harsh terms, and, subsequently, they demanded that no other archpriest be elected who was not from Modugno. No other foreign archpriest is recorded until 1826 when Nicola Affatani of Gioia del Colle was elected.

=== The government of Bona Sforza (1524-1557) ===
Bona Sforza succeeded her mother Isabella in the leadership of the Duchy of Bari. On May 24, 1524, she appointed Ludovico Alifio from Bari as governor, who had to deal with a popular insurrection that drove Minister De Ruggiero out of the city.

In the context of the war between the French Frederick I of Naples and the Spaniard Charles V, struggles between the two factions and widespread devastation occurred in Apulian territory: during this period the township of Balsignano was destroyed. Bona Sforza, despite the advance of the French declared her loyalty to the Spanish. Lautrec's troops attacked the tower of Sant'Andrea, which was along the road between Modugno and Bari, being repelled by the tower's garrison.

Bona, until 1556, administered her duchy from Poland. Her rule was strict and authoritarian, but also magnanimous and benevolent to her subjects. From Poland she directed many interventions in her duchy by making donations in favor of Modugno. In 1518 (when she was still Duchess Isabella) she granted the Chapter of Modugno 425 liras to restore the church of Maria Santissima Annunziata, granted the creation of an eight-day market in favor of the church of Sant'Eligio (now the church of San Giuseppe delle Monacelle), and had a hospital built for the poor near the same church.

Bona tried to alleviate the suffering of the duchy's population, which often suffered from drought, by having several wells built. In Modugno, she had a 60-meter-deep well built along the road leading to Carbonara, which remained visible until 1960. In addition, she had a canal built along the walls of Modugno to prevent sewage from stagnating in the streets and causing disease.

Queen Bona brought with her to the court of Sigismund I several men of letters and culture, whom she made her ministers. These included the Modugnese Scipione Scolaro, Girolamo Cornale (Amedeo's brother) and Vito Pascale, who was so highly esteemed at court that when the latter asked to return home, the young Sigismund II Augustus asked him to stay by appointing him chancellor.

It is possible, but there is no certain information about it, that the queen owned her own palace in Modugno to which she went when visiting the city. It is identified in a building that still stands today near the Church of the Carmine. It is certain that Bona owned a horse stable in Modugno near the mother church.

Bona also sought to expand her duchy: in 1536 she purchased the town of Capurso, and in 1542 she also bought the county of Noia and Triggiano. In order to reach the amount needed to purchase the county (68,000 ducats) she imposed new taxes on her fiefs, and on this occasion the Universitas of Bari (municipal administration) complained to the queen that Modugno was “lauded and loved more than this city (Bari) by your majesty.”

After her husband's death, Bona Sforza decided to move to Apulia from Poland, also followed by her Modugno advisers Scipione Scolaro and Vito Pascale. The latter while still in Poland, had been given a gift from the Universitas of Modugno on December 5, 1550, of land overlooking the main square where the Pascale-Scarli palace was built.

In November 1557 Queen Bona Sforza died, leaving the duchy to the Crown of the Kingdom of Naples.

== Spanish Habsburg Viceroyalty (1503 - 1707) ==
In the early period of Spanish rule, Modugno had the good fortune of being a duchy under the diligent care of Isabella of Aragon and Bona Sforza, but with the passage to the Spanish Crown it suffered the consequences of its misrule, which led it to severe economic, political and social decline.

Between 1550 and 1650 the urban expansion begun in the previous century, in the Aragonese period, continued. In these years were built progressively, the Scarli Palace, the church of Santa Maria della Croce, the Cesena Palace on the Motta, the bell tower was erected and the Mother Church enlarged in its present form, the Olivetan convent for maidens of noble origin was erected, while those of Santa Maria della Purità, also known as the Monacelle, remained reserved for nuns of humble condition.

By the end of the seventeenth century, Modugno was a major center for trade in agricultural products. Modugno was a link between Bari and its hinterland, as agricultural production from several neighboring towns flowed right into Modugno to be placed on the larger Bari market. During this period, the city of Modugno's agriculture diversified, favoring the monoculture of almonds, olives, vines and cherries. Modugnese society was stratified and diversified, including peasants and agricultural laborers, but also artisans, merchants, self-employed professionals and wealthy landowners.

=== Oppression by the Spanish government ===
One of the characteristics of Spanish rule was an increased tax burden that focused more on the poor since the large feudal lords and clergy were exempt. From a register titled “Book of all the Chapters of Taxes and Impositions of the Magnificent Universitas of Modugno,” it appears that there were taxes on every commercial activity and every good: there were taxes on flour (it was forbidden to grind wheat outside the municipal territory), on bread, on the milling of olives, on must, on wine (the tax amounted to a quarter of the selling price of wine), on grapes, on almonds, on dairy products, on fresh and salted fish, on the possession of animals and the slaughtering of meat, on the introduction of goods into the city, on the occupation of public land, etc.

Apulia also remained under the threat of raids by Turkish pirates. In 1647 Governor Giorgio Sguerra de Rozas was sent to Bari to counter a possible landing of Turks, and some Spanish companies also stayed in Modugno. Cities that hosted military garrisons were obliged to provide sustenance for the troops at great expense to municipal coffers. It was considered a privilege not to host a Spanish garrison, a privilege that had to be paid for. The city, in 1619, took out a loan of 2,500 ducats to provide for the maintenance of some companies of soldiers.

=== Freedom from feudal serfdom ===
As noted, upon the death of Bona Sforza, the territories of Bari, Modugno and Palo del Colle returned to the Spanish Crown. The following year Modugno and Palo were given as a feud to Don Garcia Toledo with the prohibition to resell the fiefdom. In this manner, upon the death of the viceroy of Sicily, the territories returned to the state property. By letters dated July 3 and August 26, 1581, Philip II again sold Modugno for 40 000 ducats to the Genoese Ansaldo Grimaldi, his adviser. Palo was sold for 50 000 ducats to Grimaldi's mother-in-law, Brigida de Mari. These sales did not include clauses.

During this period, there were many Genoese who had interests in Apulia: these included some members of the de Mari family, among whom G. Battista de Mari in 1589 bought the oil tax and flour duty of Modugno.

Ansaldo Grimaldi took possession of his fief on Nov. 12, 1581, acquiring the title "Marquis of Modugno," but the following year the city of Modugno managed to raise the 40,000 ducats (6,000 of which were given by the Chapter of Modugno and the remainder by the Universitas) needed to repay Grimaldi and acquire freedom from the feudal yoke by selling the revenues to the Genoese Battista Giustiniani, Minetta Doria and Enrico Salvago. The king gave his consent to the transaction by decree on March 22, 1585. Palo had also succeeded in redeeming itself but was sold back to Don Garcia's son Don Pietro of Toledo, who reimbursed the Universitas of Palo for the 50,000 ducats paid for the redemption and, in 1582, sold the fief back to his uncle Don Luigi of Toledo for 54,000 ducats. Palo never regained its freedom and from then on began “the first sad and painful period of Palo history, during which every abuse was licit, every oppression permitted, every usurpation allowed.”

The coat of arms of the municipality of Modugno

Acquiring and maintaining state freedom was a privilege: of the more than 1,400 cities and lands in the Kingdom of Naples, only 58 were free from feudal ties; 18 of them were in Apulia: Bari, Lecce, Barletta, Trani, Foggia, Taranto, Vieste, Gallipoli, Bisceglie, Modugno, Otranto, Cisternino, Ariano, Bitonto and Monopoli. Modugno also obtained the “grace of perpetual statehood,” that is, to maintain in eternity the freedom it had acquired. The municipal coat of arms of the wild thistle was chosen as an emblem of pride and independence.

=== The fake baron ===
The Spanish government, in order not to lose the tributes owed by the feudal lord to the king (the adoa, a tax that replaced the obligation of military aid to the monarch, and the rilevio, a succession tax that was paid to allow the heir to take possession of the fief), required Modugno to appoint a fake baron to be recognized as the owner of the town's rents. The fake baron, in turn, remitted the rents to the Universitas. This custom remained in force until the early 19th century, despite an attempt made in 1781 by the Universitas of Modugno to ask the Royal Chamber to avoid this system, which involved a vicious circle of city revenues (from the people to the fake baron, from the latter to the Universitas and, finally, to the Viceroy).

The first fake baron was Andrea Novo. The Universitas of Modugno cherished the dignity of its fake baron and awarded his family a life annuity. The last fake baron was Pietro Martire Ruccia. When he died, he was to be succeeded by his eldest son, who was still a minor. In 1803, while waiting for the new fake baron to come of age, the Royal Chamber lobbied by threatening to double the tax due if it had to wait for the takeover when the new fake baron came of age. So, there was a rush to collect what was due through an extraordinary tax, the proceeds of which were kept in a safe in the Poor Clare Monastery of Santa Maria della Purità (Monacelle). However, on August 2, 1806, Joseph Bonaparte declared the feudal system abolished, and Pietro Ruccia's son was not in time to be elected as the new baron.

Despite the adverse policies of Spanish rule, in the 16th and 17th centuries Modugno was able to assume a significant role in the provincial economy. Taking advantage of its geographical location on the outskirts of Bari, Modugno became the collection point for inland agricultural products that flowed to the Bari market through Modugno. During the same period, there was a high population increase that manifested itself in the development, outside the original city walls, of the working-class neighborhood known as the Suburbio, new churches and convents, and palaces of the most important families.

This population increase was accompanied by a social diversification that was unparalleled in the other towns of the Land of Bari.

=== Collapse of the Universitas of Modugno ===
When a Universitas could not meet the government's demands, it went into debt by borrowing from merchants or wealthy landowners who demanded an interest rate of around 8 percent. Universitates, in order to repay themselves, would grant their creditors contracts for the collection of taxes. In this way, creditors cheaply acquired the rights to collect taxes and profited from the collections. At the same time, universitates were losing revenue by entering a cycle that led to the rapid depletion of all resources. At that point, the Universitas was forced to declare bankruptcy and be “deducted in patrimony” (the Royal Chamber of Sommaria entrusted the administration of the municipality's finances to a Commissioner and took the city's revenues).

Despite the social and economic development of its citizens, the Universitas of Modugno also found itself in a series of financial crises. The economic problems of the public coffers are documented as early as the sixteenth century, when a document denounced the heavy debt burdening the city: “...this Universitas has come into such extreme poverty that it does not have a penny....” In 1537 it asked the city chapter to pledge its silverware. In 1619 it had to borrow for the maintenance of Spanish troops. In 1642 an additional flour tax was levied, the right to collect which was given to Donato Olimpo, former mayor, and Marquis Flaminio Carafa. The oppression of the tax collectors became so unbearable that many citizens abandoned the city.

In 1666 the Universitas of Modugno declared bankruptcy, consequently being “deducted in patrimony.” Petitions dating from this period, filed by creditors who wanted to be compensated, abound in the city's archives. The bankrupt state of the Universitas continued throughout the next century, even under the rule of the Austrians and Bourbons, so that in 1776 Mayor Nicolò Lo Bianco, since the city was “deducted in patrimony,” could not order the urgent repair of the city walls, and the same happened in 1799 in the impending attack of the Sanfedists.

In 1783 Modugno asked the government for the release of its patrimony from reduction in the Royal Chamber of Sommaria, as its financial situation had improved. The request, however, was rejected, and the city continued to be deducted in patrimony until the early 19th century when Joseph Bonaparte declared the debts of the Universitas related to the feudal period prescribed.

== Austrian viceroyalty (1707-1734) ==
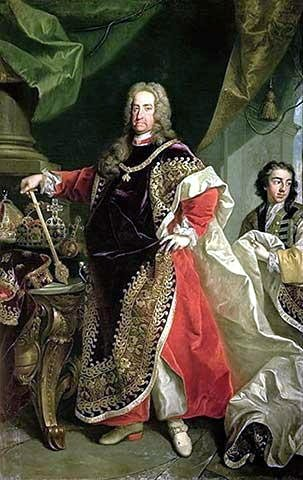
Charles VI, the only Austrian king of the Kingdom of Naples.

The rule of the House of Habsburg in Spain and the Kingdom of Naples through the viceroyalty lasted from Charles V to Charles II. As the latter was without an heir he appointed Philip V of Spain as his successor. The great European powers fearing the sudden enlargement of the influence of the House of Bourbon (which also reigned in France with Louis XIV) confederated, giving rise to a conflict, the War of the Grand Alliance, which lasted for 13 years with ups and downs. Against this backdrop, in 1707 an Austrian army descended into southern Italy, conquering the Kingdom of Naples without difficulty and occupying its capital. Afterwards, it headed for Apulia.

With the accession of Charles VI to the imperial throne, the European powers, seeing in him the dangerous resurgence of the House of Habsburg, preferred to abandon the struggle by concluding peace with Louis XIV and Philip of Bourbon. Charles VI continued the conflict on his own until it ended in 1714 with the Peace of Rastatt by which Philip V renounced joining the crowns of France and Spain, and Charles VI obtained Lombardy, the Kingdom of Naples, Sardinia (which he would give to the Savoy by obtaining Sicily) and the State of the Presidi.

The people affected by these changes expected economic recovery and a wiser new government, but they were soon greatly disappointed. Nothing changed in the administration of the Viceroyalty, and even official acts continued to be written in Spanish.

During this period, Modugno was held in high esteem at the Austrian court thanks to the work of the minister of the empire Count Rocco Stella, who interceded with the emperor to obtain for his hometown the title of "city," the confirmation of the fair of the Crucifix, and the granting of exemptions from customs duty.

In the context of the War of the Polish Succession, the Battle of Bitonto fought on May 25, 1734, marked the end of the Austrian viceroyalty and the beginning of the independent kingdom under the Bourbons of Naples. The first ruler of the new dynasty was Charles of Bourbon, recognized by the Treaty of Vienna, which ended the War of the Polish Succession in 1738. In 1744, during the War of the Austrian Succession, the Austrians attempted to regain possession of southern Italy but had to give up after the defeat at Velletri.

== Bourbon reign (1734-1799) ==
In the 18th century, Enlightenment thought spread from France throughout Europe. In Naples, too, a series of writers and intellectuals such as Tommaso Campanella, Giambattista Vico, Pietro Giannone, and Gaetano Filangieri promoted a change. In this era, sovereigns who claimed to be enlightened implemented reforms in the state even though the intent was not so much to raise popular conditions as to secure greater consensus and stability for the absolute monarchy.

Upon his ascension to the throne of Naples, Charles III of Bourbon also had to face barons who oppressed the people with their privileges, the finances of the kingdom were in the midst of a crisis, roads were crumbling and trade was limited, land was cultivated with antiquated methods, and corruption was rife at all levels of administration. With the valuable contribution of minister Bernardo Tanucci many reforms were enacted, but due to the brevity of the reign they brought few results.

Charles III's court physician was the Modugnese Francesco Struggibinetti, known for his output of treatises. Among other things, he wrote the work “Dell'abuso delle fasce” on the occasion of the queen's delivery.

Charles III was succeeded by his son Ferdinand in whose army distinguished himself the Modugnese Eusebio Capitaneo, who in 1803 became lieutenant-colonel of the II Bari Regiment of the province of Trani, earning the king's commendations and honors. Minister John Acton obstructed his promotion to general. Upon his death in 1808, the king had a mausoleum built for him in L'Aquila Cathedral. Also living during the same period was Vitangelo Maffei Junior remembered for writing the first monograph concerning Modugno.

The opera by the Taranto composer Giovanni Paisiello, Il Socrate immaginario, was set in Modugno.

=== Modugno's accession to the Parthenopean Republic and Sanfedist reaction ===
King Ferdinand continued the work begun by his father of renewing the Kingdom of Naples, inspired by Enlightenment principles, with the help of Minister John Acton. However, when the French Revolution broke out, he was greatly impressed by the fury of the masses and began to condemn the reformist initiatives.

Following the events of war in Italy due to the First Italian Campaign (1796–1797) of the French Republic troops, King Ferdinand fled from Naples to Palermo, leaving the kingdom in anarchy. French General Championnet occupied Naples on January 23, 1799, and, with the help of local revolutionaries, established the Parthenopean Republic. Soon the reactionary Sanfedist movement developed in the Kingdom of Naples, consisting mainly of commoners who started an armed struggle with the intention of defending the figure of the king and the political and social order prior to the arrival of the French, creating the Army of the Holy Faith under the leadership of Cardinal Ruffo.

Modugno joined the Republic, under pressure from the Bari Committee. For this reason, it was among the first towns in Apulia to be attacked by the Sanfedist popular militias on May 10, 1799. The Sanfedist ranks consisted of 14,000 people, including women and young boys. About 4,000 people actually participated in the fight, of whom only 500 were armed with rifles. The Modugnese defense, which could count on only 120 men deployed on the terraces of the houses, lasted from six o'clock in the morning until sixteen o'clock, when the Sanfedists gave up without succeeding in causing any damage. On the day of that resistance, which was already exceptional in itself, another extraordinary event is also remembered: the Sanfedists saw on the roof of a house a woman holding a handkerchief, who was identified as Our Lady of Sorrows, who appeared in support of the defenders and, for that reason, they moved away.

== Napoleonic French Kingdom (1805 - 1815) ==
After Napoleon's rise to power and his victory at Marengo, in the Treaty of Lunéville on February 5, 1801, Ferdinand retained his kingdom but was required to host and maintain at his own expense a French division of 13,000 men in Apulia, a bridge to Egypt. Some of these troops also lodged in Modugno. The decurion provisions of the time state that the Universitas was in debt because of “Anarchy” (the events of 1799) and the “stay that the detachment of French troops made in Modugno.” The French soldiers carried out all sorts of violence and abuse against the people, so much so that when they left Apulia in 1802, after the peace between France and England, there was a celebration with fireworks and illuminations.

The following year, however, Napoleon resumed hostilities with England and required the king of Naples to maintain French garrisons in his own kingdom. This time Modugno succeeded in avoiding the quartering of French troops, who stationed in Apulia for three years, distressing the populations in ever worse ways.

In October 1805 the Third Anti-Napoleonic Coalition was formed and Napoleon recalled his troops from the Kingdom of the Two Sicilies to deploy them on the Austrian front. Ferdinand of Bourbon seized the opportunity to join the coalition by requiring enlistment in every municipality (Modugno also participated). Napoleon defeated his enemies at Ulm and Austerlitz, and Ferdinand was forced to flee to Sicily.

French troops invaded the Kingdom of Naples, and Joseph Bonaparte, Napoleon's brother, was elected king in 1806. On his arrival in Naples he was greeted by the enthusiasm of the supporters of the revolutionary principles; even Modugno sent its representatives to the capital to pay homage to the new king.

Joseph Bonaparte soon began with the implementation of radical reforms, such as the aforementioned abolition of the feudal regime on August 2, 1806 (in Modugno the farcical election of the fake baron was ended), the abolition of many religious orders with the banning of the Jesuits from the kingdom and the confiscation of monastic property (in Modugno the Augustinians had to leave their church and the Dominicans their convent), the beginning of agrarian reform to combat latifundia, tax reform with the elimination of taxes on the consumption of goods necessary for the subsistence of poor families, the adoption of the metric system, which, however, was not always used by the people, the creation of schools in every municipality (on October 1, 1806, the first school was created in Modugno, which consisted of two sections: the male one entrusted to Friar Domenico Carroccia and which held classes in the premises of the Purgatory Church; and the female section entrusted to Morena Anastasia who held classes in a room rented from the Scarli family). Joseph Bonaparte abolished the electoral system that provided for election based on social class, introducing the right to vote based on income, and the city's new Decurionate was created in Modugno on November 27, 1806.

Joseph wanted to see for himself the conditions of the populations on a trip to the various regions of the kingdom, passing through Apulia in 1807. On March 28 he arrived in Barletta, where he was honored by representatives of the Apulian cities; for Modugno the mayor Francesco Santoro and decurion Francesco Scura were present. The next stop on his journey was Bari. The king was therefore to travel through the coastal part of the territory (at Palese, now part of Bari). On this occasion 56 ducats and 15 grani were spent.

Joseph Bonaparte imposed compulsory military service, which provided for the enlistment of one person for every 1,000 inhabitants. Modugno, consisting at the time of a population of about 5,000 inhabitants had to provide the king's army with 5 men. Desertion and evasion were so widespread that of the 47 Modugnese who were to be drafted, only 5 showed up. But even these five soon went into hiding and had to be replaced. At least six replacements had to be made for each of them; in fact, those who were called as replacements were found to be unfit or deserted.

However, during this period, there were no reports of French soldiers being abused, and their maintenance no longer burdened municipal budgets: the government compensated the Modugno Decurionate for the expenses incurred during the January and February 1808 deployment of a detachment of Mounted Hunters.

=== Government of Joachim Murat ===
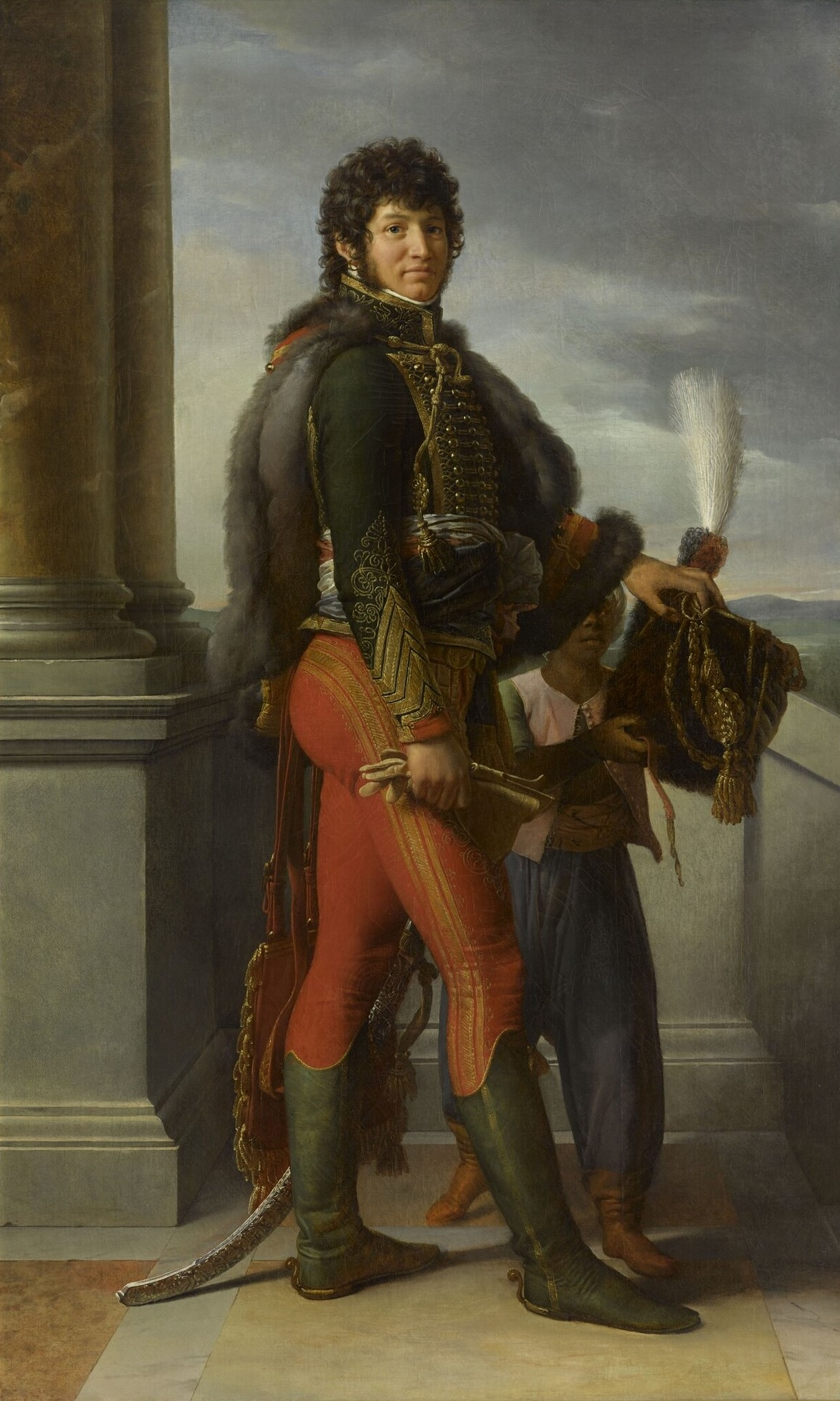
Joachim Murat

Joseph Bonaparte's government in Naples lasted only two years. After the French conquest of Spain he was appointed its king. His place was taken by Napoleon's brother-in-law Joachim Murat. The latter arrived in Naples on June 10, 1808. He continued the policy of reforms begun by his predecessor and in just seven years succeeded in transforming the Kingdom of Naples into a modern state.

He changed the legislative system by adopting the Napoleonic Code and gave a strong boost to communications and trade by building new roads and restoring markets and fairs that had been abolished during previous occupations. Modugno asked for the restoration of the Sunday market, the Crucifix fair and the fair dedicated to St. Peter Martyr; he also proposed the creation of three new fairs to be held during March 10, and the feasts of St. Nicholas of Tolentino and St. Roch. Murat granted all the requests.

His domestic policy clashed with Napoleon's needs; discontent began to spread because of the heavy tax burden necessary for war expenses and military conscription. After the defeat in the Russian Campaign, pro-Bourbon guerrillas and brigands gained strength and began to create outbreaks of revolt against the king. Murat dealt with the situation by suppressing the revolts and gracing the sympathies of the population with a trip to the regions of his kingdom. He arrived in Bari on April 24, 1813, and remained there the following day when he initiated the construction of the new quarter outside the ancient city walls. On April 25, Murat signed the decree transferring the Modugno hospital from the church of San Vito to the premises of the suppressed Augustinian convent.

With the final fall of Napoleon, after seeking an agreement with Austria, after the “Rimini Proclamation,” and after a final coup in Calabria, Murat was arrested and sentenced to death. On June 9, 1815, Ferdinand of Bourbon returned to the throne of Naples.

=== Modugnese economy in the first half of the 19th century ===
In the early part of the nineteenth century, Modugno was an important center for the collection, processing and marketing of agricultural products. The Modugno area is characterized by the presence of a large number of industrial buildings (oil mills, mills, oil storehouses, as well as almond and other agricultural products). This is evidenced by the fact that in 1806 the taxable income on industrial buildings in Modugno was 1,097.28 ducats, while in Bari it was 1,180 ducats. Thus, as far as industry and trade were concerned, Modugno was very similar in importance to Bari and far higher than neighboring towns such as Bitetto (which had a taxable income of less than a third), Bitritto (70 ducats), Toritto (202 ducats, Giovinazzo (54 ducats), and Grumo Appula (662 ducats).

This greater presence of industrial buildings with consequent industrial activities dates back to ancient times and is confirmed in the Catasto Onciario of 1752. Modugno was an important center of processing and marketing of agricultural and craft products that arrived from neighboring towns (particularly Bitetto, Bitritto, Grumo and Toritto) and found their way to the nearby Bari market and its port. Modugno contested the primacy of trade with cities with far richer agricultural production such as Bitonto and Palo del Colle.

In the early decades of the nineteenth century, Provençal entrepreneur Pierre Ravanas introduced innovative olive harvesting and processing techniques in Apulia through a new piece of machinery: the double-grindstone mill and the hydraulic press. In 1840 he opened one of his olive mills in Modugno, on the premises of the former Dominican convent. This was the largest among the mills run by Pierre Ravanas: it had 10 stacks, 10 wooden presses and 3 hydraulic presses. The plant had a production of about 1,200 liters of oil in 1842. There was also a workshop at this plant that allowed for the first time the independent construction of barrels and presses without having to import them from France. Another innovation introduced by Pierre Ravanas is recorded here for the first time: the use of cotton wool to filter the oil that came out of the presses. The introduction of this innovation arose from the need to respond to the large quantity of orders received, which did not allow waiting for the removal of impurities by decantation.

== Bourbon Kingdom (1816-1860) ==
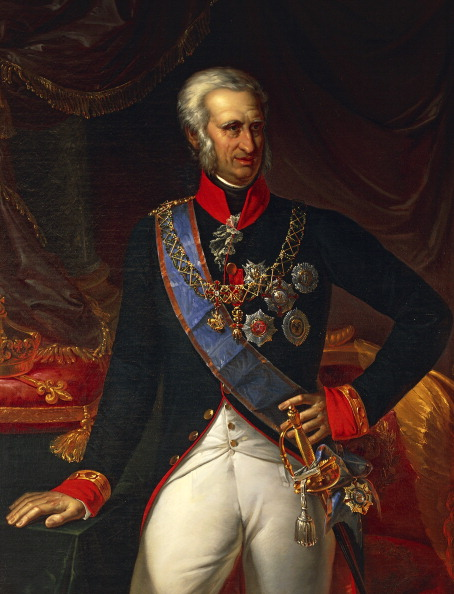
Ferdinand I of the Two Sicilies

At the Congress of Vienna it was decided, among other things, to reinstate King Ferdinand to Naples, and on December 7, 1816, Ferdinand IV of Naples, assumed the name Ferdinand I of the Two Sicilies.

In December 1815 a plague broke out in Noja (present-day Noicattaro) brought by a ship from Greece. The town was cordoned off and isolated to prevent the spread of the disease. A maritime cordon was also created to prevent the arrival of other ships with infected crews from the opposite coast of the Adriatic Sea. The measures taken achieved the desired effects, but the Modugno Decurionate spent 327 ducats and 62 grani, which it was unable to get reimbursed by the government.

The walls of Modugno had long been deteriorated and dangerous to nearby dwellings due to sewage stagnation; they had already proved unsuitable for effective defense since the siege of 1799 and left unmaintained, and new neighborhoods had developed outside. On December 3, 1820, it was decided that they should be torn down, and in order not to burden the poor city budget it was stipulated that those who owned dwellings near the walls themselves should provide for them at their own expense.

Ferdinand continued with the policy of building new roads initiated by his predecessors. In 1816 a road connecting Bari to Altamura was planned. This project involved crossing Modugno by entering through the Bari Gate and exiting through the Aja Gate. But with the demolition of the city walls, a variation of the project was proposed so that the road would run past and not through the town. Thus the Modugnese section of the Bari-Altamura was built between 1821 and 1822 with a wide roadway corresponding to today's Via Roma and Corso Vittorio Emanuele. The road was called “via nova” by the population, referring both to its recent creation and to the concept with which it was built: straight and wide, whereas people were used to narrow and winding mule tracks. The development of road infrastructure that took place during this period was facilitated by the possibility that municipalities had of advancing expenses and then requesting reimbursement from the state. During this period the Modugno-Bitonto was also built as a link between the pre-existing Bari-Altamura and Bitonto-Canosa. Between 1876 and 1880 the Modugno-Bitritto was built.

Begun in the Napoleonic period, the work of reforming the institutions of the kingdom continued by means of the “Urban Police Regulations.” The first of these with regard to Modugno is dated 1818. The regulations regarding public hygiene were of particular interest: manure could not be piled up in front of houses or near the town, it was forbidden to throw sewage out of windows but was allowed to do so from the door, no shards or glass could be thrown into the street, every citizen had to provide for the cleaning of the stretch of road in front of his house, no waste from olive processing could be disposed of near the town, no animals for slaughter could be killed in the town, etc. Other regulations concerned commercial fraud, the dignity of the town, public order and the tranquility of town life.

In 1836, there was a cholera epidemic, during which the Modugnese physician Nicola Longo, who was appointed president of the provincial sanitary council, distinguished himself by going to the places where the disease was most severe to help at first hand.

=== Carboneria ===
The revolutionary ideas brought to Italy by Napoleon also gave rise to claims for constitutional freedom and national unity. They took concrete form in the secret Carbonari associations, which also spread to the Kingdom of Naples involving members of the bourgeoisie, clergy and nobility. An early form of Carboneria already existed in the time of Joachim Murat, who at first indulged it but later banned it. Ferdinand of Bourbon, who from exile had taken advantage of the veto to seek the sympathies of the patriots, broadened his repressions when he returned to the throne by means of the police, who were in charge of compiling lists with the names of the Carbonari. From these lists are known the names of 92 Modugnese belonging to the Carboneria and that the leader of the Modugnese section (known as the Santo Spirito cell) was Pietro Capitaneo. The Carboneria controlled the Modugnese municipal administration: several mayors and decurions were members of the Carboneria.

During the 1820 uprisings initiated by Michele Morelli and Giuseppe Silvati, secret meetings were held in Modugno in the house of Lorenzo Minielli. When the constitution was proclaimed as a result of those uprisings, in the celebrations where Nicola Russo and Gaetano Cesena distinguished themselves by waving the tricolor of the Carboneria, the priest Nicola Priore with a tricolor sash on his chest and the priest Luigi Loiacono shouting “Long live the Constitution” waved the crucifix. Landowner Pietro Maranta and Capuchin Luigi da Palo gave speeches. Festivities were also organized “with the utmost pomp for such a happy event” with “music, ornaments and other things,” the cost of which was “seventy-seven and a half ducats.”

When it was decided at the Congress of Laibach to intervene in southern Italy to suppress the revolt, many Carbonari enlisted volunteers to repel, under the command of General Guglielmo Pepe, the Austrian troops. Two battalions of legionnaires departed from Bari, to which the 22 volunteer Carbonari from Modugno were assigned (of whom 17 left): 1 held the rank of captain, 1 held the rank of sergeant major, 6 held the rank of sergeant, and the others were simple legionnaires. However, after news of General Pepe's first defeats, the initial enthusiasm of the Bari legion, commanded by Colonel Carlo Nicolai, waned rapidly and desertions occurred so that the legion did not join the general fighting in Abruzzo. On March 24, 1821, the Austrians entered Naples re-establishing the initial situation and began a fierce repression.

One of Ferdinand I's first measures was to have lists drawn up in each municipality of Carbonari and those who had taken part in the Neapolitan uprising; against those who turned out to be on these lists he established a series of sanctions: police surveillance, exclusion from public offices and public employment, and imprisonment. The application of these sanctions, especially in the provinces, affected only the socially and economically weaker. In Modugno, for example, many Carboneria affiliates, such as Giuseppe Capitaneo and Pietro Maranta, continued to hold important public offices, and the physician Nicola Longo was reinstated in aristocratic circles to such an extent that he was awarded by Ferdinand II of Bourbon the title of Knight of the Order of Saint George of the Reunion, for providing medical care to the sovereign.

=== Risorgimento ===
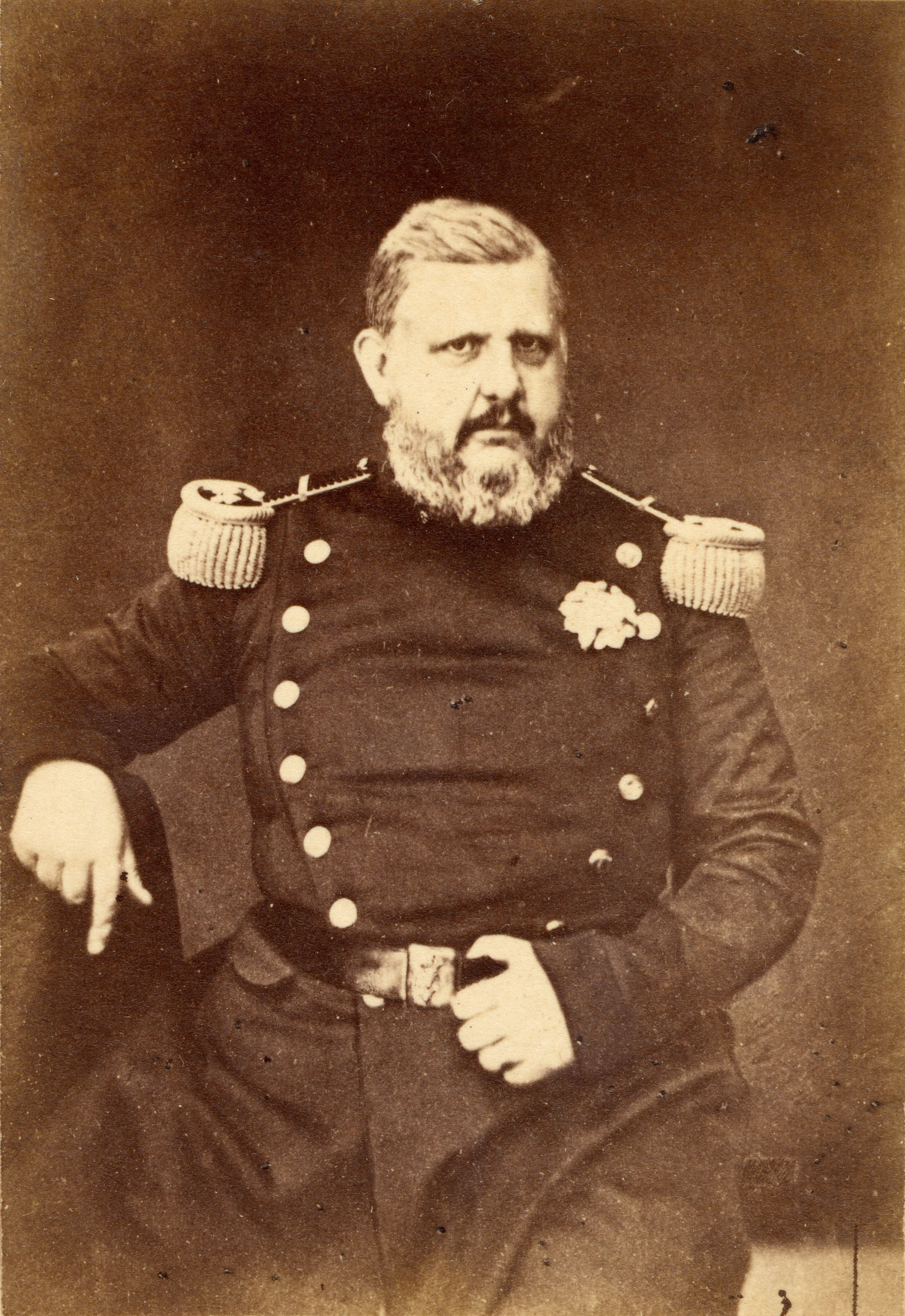
Ferdinand II of the Two Sicilies

In 1848 revolutionary uprisings occurred throughout Europe. In response to the uprisings that occurred in Sicily and the Kingdom of Naples in January and February 1948, Ferdinand II granted the constitution on February 11. Elections to elect representatives of the newly formed parliament were held in Modugno in the Purgatory Church.

In the same year the first war of independence broke out, to which Ferdinand II contributed an army of 16,000 men led by General Guglielmo Pepe. The Decurionate of Modugno allocated 40 ducats to the families of the soldiers in need.

The great poverty of the population and the new changes that exclusively benefited the bourgeoisie caused discontent that took shape in the demonstrations and riots that also occurred in Modugno on April 30, 1848, and ended only after the intervention of public force.

At the same time, Ferdinand II, who had unwillingly granted the constitution and participated in the War of Independence, began to restrict the freedoms granted. To the protests of the Neapolitan patriots he responded with force by dissolving the Parliament and calling new elections. On June 15, the people of Modugno, in protest, put in the ballot box the ballot paper that read: "I reject the election of the President of the Secretaries and Deputies, considering that our representation exists legally and in the fullness of its powers. It cannot be said that it has been legally dissolved".

On July 2, the Diet of Bari was held in the capital where decisions were to be made on what to do, and Giuseppe Capitaneo was the representative from Modugno. The Diet, however, did not achieve its purpose because the defeat in the First War of Independence was accompanied by a wave of repression. All those who had participated in the Bari Diet were tried, but the testimonies of the archpriest, mayor and other citizens helped save Giuseppe Capitaneo.

Ferdinand II wanted to combine the repressions with a trip to the lands of his kingdom to endear himself to the population. In January 1859, in Apulia, he was received with great applause by the people. On this trip Ferdinand II felt the first symptoms of the illness that led to his death. When he was in Bari the best doctors in the province were summoned, including Nicola Longo of Modugno. In May 1859 Ferdinand II died in Naples and was succeeded by his son Francis II. Modugnese poet Marcello Maffei was invited to the capital to commemorate the late ruler. During Ferdinand II's reign the Modugnese Giuseppe Mario Arpino distinguished himself by serving as ambassador to London, head of the Kingdom Treasury and head of the Department in Palermo.

With the start of the Second War of Independence, patriotic sentiments were rekindled in southern Italy as well, and a “Provincial Insurrection Committee” was formed: Modugno was a part of the third section with Bari, Valenzano, Triggiano and Sannicandro di Bari. With the landing of the Thousand at Marsala, the committees of Apulia and Lucania wanted to rise up, but the central committee in Naples urged not to shed blood unnecessarily. In Modugno, as in other towns, the Insurrectional Council was established, of which Nicola Longo, among others, was a member, who hosted the headquarters of the conspirators in his home.

In September, Colonel Liborio Romano, sent by Garibaldi with the intention of making Apulia rise up in revolt, arrived in Bari. He left Altamura on September 3 at the head of two battalions of 1,200 men of Apulian volunteers who formed the "Peucetian brigade," and was welcomed by the jubilation of the people in all the towns he passed through, with the sole exception of Bitetto where there were reactionary demonstrations suppressed by the Garibaldian colonel. Subsequently, he arrived in Modugno on September 5, 1860, and there he received the homage of the mayor of Bari. The following day, Colonel Liborio Romano, accompanied by the mayor and the Intendant, entered Bari through Porta Napoli, the gate of the city walls that was located near the Norman-Swabian castle. His entry into the city, at the head of his two battalions, on horseback and in red shirts, was greeted festively by the population.

As a consequence of Garibaldi's exploits, on February 13, 1861, Francis II vacated the throne of the Kingdom of Naples, which became part of the Kingdom of Italy.

== Kingdom of Italy ==
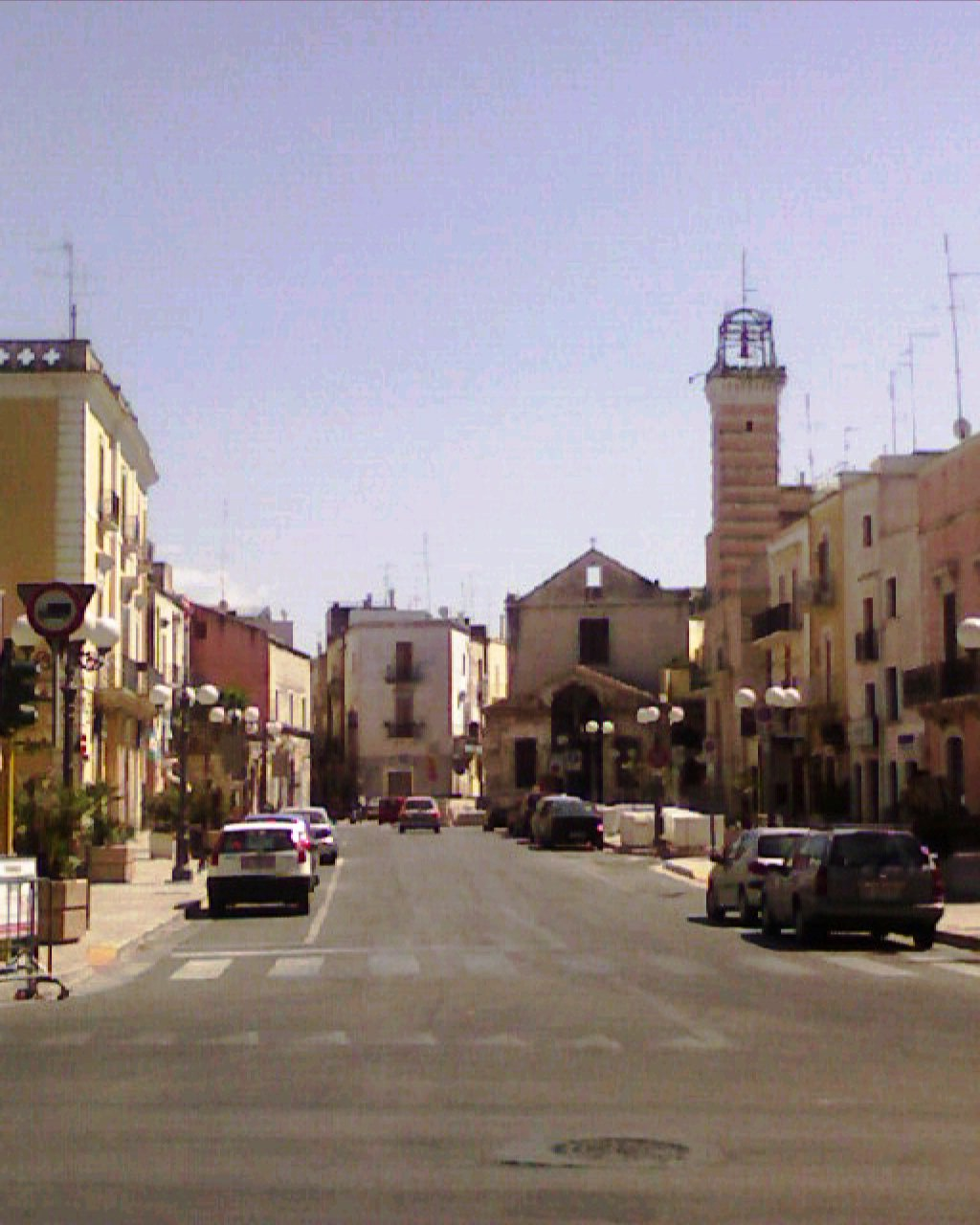
Piazza Sedile. Its current layout is posterior to the creation of the "via nova" (today's Via Roma and Corso Vittorio Emanuele)

On September 24, 1860, Modugno Mayor Nicola Capitaneo sent to the Governor of the province of Bari a parcel containing the oath of allegiance and "adherence to the Government of the Glorious Victor Emmanuel King of Italy duly signed by the public officers of the administrative branch of this municipality." It was accompanied by a letter entitled "Adherence to the Government of His Majesty Victor Emmanuel King of Italy."

On October 21, 1860, a plebiscite was held in the Neapolitan provinces to decree annexation to the Kingdom of Italy. In Modugno, the results of the vote were as follows: 2,139 votes in favor and no votes against. This outcome was in line with the results of the plebiscite in the province of Bari. However, the large number of voters who abstained must be taken into account: 4,800 ballots were delivered in Modugno.

On January 27, 1861, the first national general political elections were held after the Kingdom of Italy was proclaimed. According to the provisions of the electoral law of the Kingdom of Sardinia of November 20, 1859, adopted again in Naples on December 8, the right to vote was established on the basis of the census of 40 lire, which corresponded to 9.20 ducats. In the constituency of Bitonto, Terlizzi and Modugno, James Lacaita, a political lawyer and diplomat in England, was elected.

In the city, on public buildings the Bourbon coats of arms were replaced with Savoy ones. The administrative system changed and the Decurionate was abolished, replaced by the Municipal Council and the City Council. The new government, in order to increase jobs, invested in public works: the Municipality of Modugno was given 452 ducats, which it used for road works and the remaking of the Piazza Sedile. On November 3, 1861, the names of some city streets and squares were changed, naming them Piazza del Plebiscito, Corso Vittorio Emanuele, Piazza Garibaldi, and Strada Cavour. During the Third War of Independence a battalion of Italian volunteers stopped in Modugno.

The first years after the unification of Italy were very difficult, especially in the South where much of the population, nobility and clergy opposed the Savoy monarchy. Among the causes of the population's discontent were increased tax burdens, rising grain prices and compulsory military conscription: in Modugno alone, more than 90 former soldiers of the Bourbon army asked to be exempted from military service in the new Savoy army.

In addition, there was a strong impetus for brigandage, which, by its anti-government nature, was encouraged and helped by the populations. The Italian government's reaction was very harsh: the army was sent to the South and 1000 were shot, 3000 imprisoned and over 2500 killed in conflicts. Frequent acts of brigandage were not recorded in Modugno because of its proximity to the capital and the absence of woods in which to hide. In May 1862, the town council learned of the imminent arrival in the territory of Palese of two brigands: the National Guard was alerted and captured one of them. On January 1, 1863, a subscription was opened to fight brigandage in the South and Modugno participated with 400 liras.

Gradually, the feeling of belonging to the Italian nation and important state anniversaries also grew in the Southern populations. Garibaldi's arrival in Naples, the Plebiscite, the granting of the Statute, were celebrated by all with illuminations and fireworks. When Victor Emmanuel II died, a large monument in memory of the late king was planned in Rome, for the construction of which Modugno donated 200 liras. On the twenty-fifth anniversary of the Capture of Rome there were large celebrations in Modugno, and “Via La Marina” was renamed “Via XX Settembre.” Following the assassination attempt on Umberto I, solemn funerals were held in the Mother Church, the Municipal Council displayed mourning for a month and a plaque was placed on the facade of the Sala del Sedile dei Nobili.

In those same years there was a serious economic crisis in Italy with a rapid increase in prices. The Municipal Council on April 19, 1898, to help the citizenry, decided to set the price of flour at 42 cents by reimbursing the bakers for the excess. This was not enough; on the afternoon of April 27, having heard the news of the Bari riots, a protest began that caused the price of flour to be lowered to 30 cents and that of bread to 25. An infantry division was called in, which on the night of April 28 arrested about 50 Modugnese who had stood out in the demonstrations. The troops left the city in May. In an attempt to resolve the situation, the Municipal Administration tried, unsuccessfully, to incur a debt of 10,000 liras. The members of the council then decided to pay out of their own pockets what was necessary for the population.

=== World War I ===
During World War I Bari suffered several bombings, one of the most devastating occurring on August 11, 1918, in retaliation after Gabriele D'Annunzio's propaganda flight over Vienna. Modugno did not suffer directly from the bombardments but supplies were rationed and the former Dominican convent housed some units. After the defeat in the Battle of Caporetto the Modugnese citizenry took in several refugee families.

Many Modugnese were enlisted in the 9th Infantry Regiment "Bari" (decorated with a gold medal of valor by General Luigi Cadorna) and the “Bari Brigade.” 130 Modugnese soldiers perished in the conflict. Sigismondo Pantaleo died as a result of the sabotage of the ship Benedetto Brin; a plaque on the facade of the Sala del Sedile recalls his sacrifice. Giuseppe Loiacono was promoted from sergeant to second lieutenant and deserved two silver medals, one bronze medal and the cross of knight of the Crown of Italy. Several other Modugnese distinguished themselves for valor and merit.

In 1918, the Spanish flu epidemic also spread to Modugno, causing a hundred deaths.

=== Fascist period ===
On October 28, 1922, the Modugno priest Pietro Stea also participated in the March on Rome, who later did not take part in any of fascism's initiatives. Between 1924 and 1926, serious acts of violence by squadrists also occurred in Modugno.

A political secretary was appointed in the municipalities, and Pietro Capitaneo was the first to hold this position in Modugno. In the Sala del Sedile the Comando del Fascio was established. In 1927 the figure of the Podestà was created as a substitute for the mayor. The first Modugno podestà was Alfredo Umberto Crispo, son of General Alberto Crispo Cappai. In 1931 the construction of one of the first industries in the territory of Modugno was begun: the cement plant of the Cementerie delle Puglie company, later Italcementi, which remained in full operation until 1975.

=== World War II ===
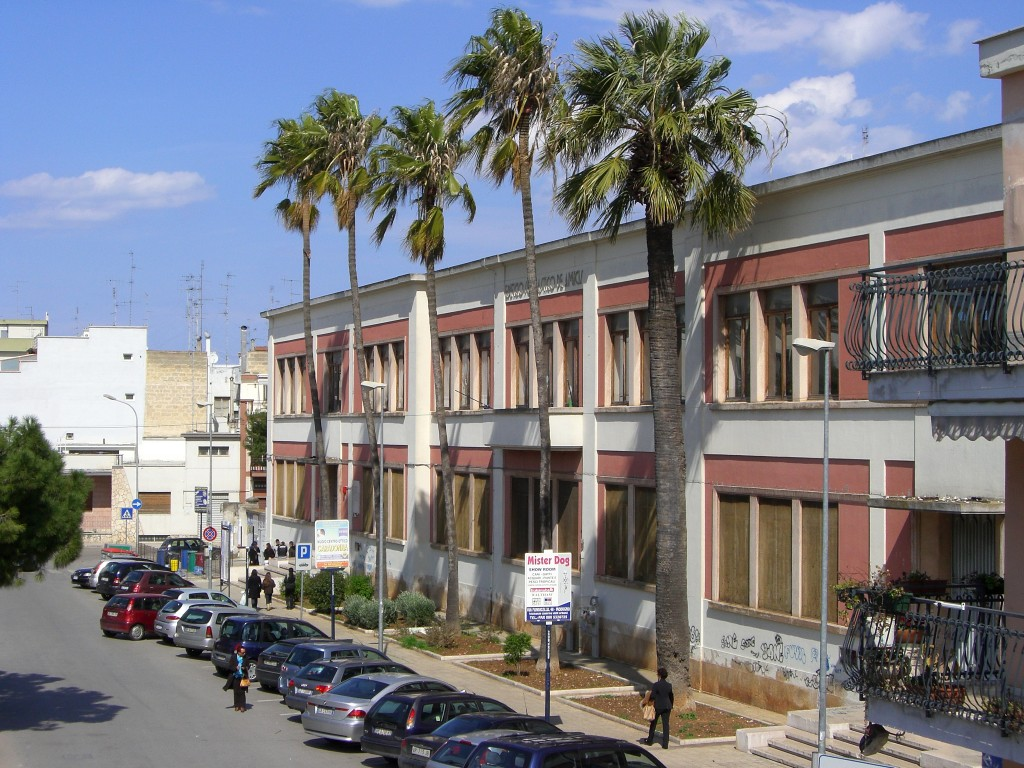
The Edmondo De Amicis Educational Institution used as a Red Cross hospital during World War II.

Following Italy's entry into World War II and the invasion of Greece, Apulia was exposed to aerial bombardment by the Allies. Many families moved from Bari to Modugno. In 1941, at the beginning of the Eastern Front, ten inhabitants of Modugno lost their lives. The new school building (now dedicated to De Amicis) was used as a Red Cross hospital. The citizenry had to donate, after the gold needed to pay sanctions following the Ethiopian War, the bronze of public buildings (including church bells and those of the clock tower). With the entry of the United States into the war, bombing intensified and the city was frequently flown over by enemy bombers who dropped their bombs on July 16 and August 23, 1943, causing two deaths.

On July 24, 1943, the Grand Council of Fascism dismissed Benito Mussolini, handing over power to General Pietro Badoglio. All Fascist symbols were removed from public buildings and the old street names, which had been changed during Fascism, were restored: Piazza Sedile was named Piazza Impero. At the time when the Allied landing in Sicily was taking place, some units of retreating German soldiers stopped in Modugno, parking their tanks in the Villa Comunale to the great anxiety of the population, who feared that they wanted to settle in Modugno for the defense of Bari. But the German soldiers left on September 6 and the town was spared their reprisals resulting from the Armistice of Cassibile two days later. Moreover, again because of the armistice, several citizens perished under German fire in Greece.

A particular historical encounter that took place in late November 1943 was witnessed in the nineteenth-century villa Longo de Bellis of Nicola Longo located on the waterfront between Palese and Santo Spirito. In this villa, requisitioned by Anglo-American forces from Professor Carlo Longo of Modugno, British General Harold Alexander, U.S. General Dwight D. Eisenhower and Marshal of Italy Pietro Badoglio met to discuss the armistice. Specifically in the meeting, Marshal Badoglio asked General Alexander to provide him with weapons to help drive the Germans out of Italy. General Alexander was reluctant and General Eisenhower took a position of neutrality. The meeting was fruitless.

A few days after the Germans left, the Allies arrived. Some soldiers lodged in the Boschetto causing serious damage; other soldiers occupied the ground floor of the Town Hall. British officers settled in Palazzo Crispo and Palazzo Russo evacuating the inhabitants. During the German air attack in the port of Bari on December 2, 1943, twenty ships were destroyed and many people lost their lives; the explosion of the ships caused a displacement of air that broke the stained glass windows of the Mother Church of Modugno. An episode of similar severity was repeated on April 19, 1945. In World War II, 92 Modugno soldiers lost their lives.

While the Republic of Salò was formed in northern Italy, the first free parties were formed in the south: the Christian Democracy, the Italian Socialist Party, the Italian Communist Party, the Italian Liberal Party and the local National Liberation Committee was formed in Modugno, which avoided reprisals against former fascist leaders.

== Italian Republic ==
The institutional referendum of 1946 decided on the adoption of the republican form of government, much to the surprise of the people of southern Italy who had largely voted for the permanence of the monarchy. In Modugno, there were 5469 votes for the monarchy and only 932 for the republic. The monarchists organized themselves into an autonomous party led, in the city, by Giuseppe Abruzzese of Bitetto, which grew in consensus until it reached a majority in the 1952 local elections. A few years later, however, a rapid decline began.

With the severe crisis that accompanied the end of World War II, many Italians decided to migrate abroad in search of work. Already by the early twentieth century small colonies of Modugnese had formed in New York and Canada, but from this period a very large migratory flow began, involving entire families between the 1950s and 1960s. A community of 3,000 Modugnese was created in Toronto and a smaller one in Montréal. The Toronto community keeps Modugnese traditions alive in Canada and has a permanent committee to celebrate Saint Roch and Our Lady of Sorrows.

=== Industrial and demographic development between the 1960s and 1990s ===
The history of Modugno, from the second half of the twentieth century, is inextricably linked to that of the Bari industrial zone, which covers a large part of the Modugno municipal area. The industrial zone began its development in 1960 with the establishment of the Industrial Development Area Consortium. The first nucleus was formed thanks to the support of the Cassa del Mezzogiorno and the incentives provided by then Prime Minister Aldo Moro for the relocation of the historical craft enterprises located in the city of Bari to the new pole.

Between 1961 and 1964 there was strong growth as a result of the establishment of large public and private companies such as Breda Fucine Meridionali, Manifattura Tabacchi, Sobib Coca-Cola and Pignone Sud (now Nuovo Pignone). In the following years, from 1965 to 1975, additional large companies, including international ones, settled there: Philips, Fiat, OSRAM, Alco-Palmera, Bosch, RIV-SKF, Firestone-Brema (now Bridgestone Firestone). In the period between 1975 and 1995, the industrial zone grew with the entry of new small and medium-sized companies. Since 1996, with the new Getrag plant, further growth of the Bari industrial zone was achieved. The 2008 financial crisis also affected this industrial zone, but most companies continued their activities.

The development of the industrial zone was accompanied by a similar demographic development: the population of Modugno increased significantly, tripling from the 1960s to the 1990s. This rapid population growth made Modugno the twenty-first most populous of the more than 250 municipalities in Apulia, and the third most populous municipality in Apulia in terms of population density, considering that the surface area of the municipality remained the same. A peculiar consequence of the urban development associated with the expansion of the industrial zone that characterized Modugno was the creation in 1969 of the urban agglomeration known as the Cecilia district, which developed close to the industrial zone and contiguous to the San Paolo district of Bari, and is now home to about 5,000 inhabitants.

The economic and construction growth attracted the interest of the Mafia, which were active in the municipal area in the 1990s and caused the dissolution of the city council for Mafia infiltration in 1993 and 1994.

== Main sights ==
- Sanctuary of Santa Maria della Grotta: this sanctuary originated as a rock church in the 8th century, where Basilian monks took refuge during the Iconoclast controversy in Byzantium. In the 11th century a Benedictine abbey was constructed, which was used by crusaders en route to the Holy Land during the following centuries. In 1313 the abbey was suppressed by King Robert of Naples and abandoned.
- Church of Santa Maria Santissima Annunziata: In the 11th century, this church was the cathedral of the short-lived diocese of Modugno. It was restored in 1347–1518 and again in 1626 under the direction of Bartolomeo Amendola. The church consists of a large single nave, with a large . The bell tower, in Apulian Romanesque style, was completed in 1615; it features a series of mullioned windows and stands and more than 60 m. The interior houses the Annunciation (1472) by Bartolomeo Vivarini.
- Church of Sant'Antonio: this small Byzantine structure was built in the 14th century outside the medieval walls.
- Church of San Giovanni Battista (14th century): this Byzantine-style church was once associated to a city hospital
- Church of San Giuseppe delle Monacelle: This 16th and 17th century church was built and decorated in Baroque style.
- Sala del Sedile dei Nobili (current appearance dating from the 18th century)
- Municipal Palace: Now a city hall, the structure retains a cloister and bell tower from the original Benedictine abbey
- Palazzo Angarano-Maranta (18th century) and Palazzo del I ramo della famiglia Capitaneo (16th century), both in Renaissance style.
- Il Monaco menhir, on the road towards Bitonto

== Bibliography ==
- Aldimari, Luigi (1691). Historia genealogica della famiglia Carafa, Parte 3 [Genealogical History of the Carafa Family, Part 3] (in Italian). Napoli: Stamperia di Giacomo Raillard.
- Angione, Pietro; Bedini, Balduino (2012). "San Corrado di Baviera (di Chiaravalle)". Enciclopedia dei Santi, SantieBeati.it (in Italian). Archived from the original on March 19, 2021.
- Barcone, Mina (January 27, 2020). "Bari, Villa Longo De Bellis: lì dove si tenne il vertice tra Alexander, Eisenhower e Badoglio" (in Italian). Archived from the original on March 19, 2021. [Bari, Villa Longo De Bellis: where the summit between Alexander, Eisenhower and Badoglio was held.]
- Beatillo, Antonio (1637). Historia di Bari. Principal città della Puglia [History of Bari. Main city of Apulia] (in Italian). Forni.
- Benigno, Francesco; Giarrizzo, Giuseppe (1999). Storia della Sicilia [History of Sicily] (in Italian). Vol. 3. Roma-Bari: Laterza. ISBN 88-421-0535-X.
- Bianchi, Ornella (2000). L'impresa agro-industriale: un'economia urbana e rurale tra XIX e XX secolo [The agro-industrial enterprise: an urban and rural economy between the 19th and 20th centuries] (in Italian). Bari: edizioni Dedalo. ISBN 8822041593.
- Bosisio, Alfredo (1978). Storia di Milano [History of Milan] (in Italian). Firenze-Milano: Giunti-Martello.
- Brancaccio, Giovanni (2001). Nazione genovese: consoli e colonia nella Napoli moderna [Genoese nation: consuls and colony in modern Naples] (in Italian). Napoli: Guida Editori. ISBN 978-88-7188-444-8. Archived from the original on January 9, 2021.
- Cassano, R. (2009). Stato degli studi e prospettive della ricerca in "Atti del Convegno La Puglia centrale dall'età del Bronzo all'Alto Medioevo: Archeologia e storia" (Bari 15-16 giugno 2009) [Status of studies and research perspectives in “Proceedings of the Conference Central Apulia from the Bronze Age to the Early Middle Ages: Archaeology and History” (Bari June 15–16, 2009)] (in Italian). Università di Bari. ISBN 978-88-7689-249-3.
- Ceraudo, G. (2008). Via Gellia: una strada fantasma in Puglia centrale, in Studi di Antichità 12 [Via Gellia: a ghost road in central Apulia, in Studies in Antiquity 12] (in Italian).
- Ciancio, A. (1989). Peucezia preromana. L'organizzazione del territorio e le strutture del popolamento, in Archeologia e territorio, l'area Peuceta. Atti del Seminario di studi (Gioia del Colle, Museo Archeologico nazionale, 12-14 novembre 1987) [Pre-Roman Peucetia. The organization of the territory and the structures of peopling, in Archaeology and Territory, the Peucetian Area. Proceedings of the Seminar of Studies (Gioia del Colle, National Archaeological Museum, November 12–14, 1987).] (in Italian). Gioia del Colle.
- Codice Diplomatico Barese. Codice Diplomatico Barese, Volume IV, Le pergamene di S. Nicola di Bari : periodo greco (939-1071) [Barese Diplomatic Codex, Volume IV, The scrolls of St. Nicholas of Bari : Greek period (939-1071)] (in Italian).
- Colapietra, Raffaele (1982). Genovesi in Puglia nel Cinque e Seicento [Genoese in Apulia in the Sixteenth and Seventeenth Centuries] (in Italian). Bari: Società Storia Patria Bari.
- Collenuccio, Pandolfo; Roseo, Mambrino (1591). Del compendio dell'istoria del regno di Napoli [About the compendium of the history of the kingdom of Naples] (in Italian). Venezia. Archived from the original on January 9, 2021.
- Crescimbeni, Mario (1721). Notizie istoriche degli Arcadi morti [Historical news of the dead Arcadians] (in Italian). Roma: Stamperia Antonio De Rossi.
- Croce, Benedetto (1966). Storia del Regno di Napoli [History of the Kingdom of Naples] (in Italian). Bari: Laterza.
- Cuoco, Vincenzo (1999). Saggio storico sulla rivoluzione napoletana del 1799 [Historical essay on the Neapolitan revolution of 1799] (in Italian). Milano: Rizzoli (BUR).
- Daconto, Saverio (1908). La provincia di Bari nel 1848-49 [The province of Bari in 1848-49] (in Italian). Trani: Edizioni Vecchi.
- De Bellis, Giovanni (1888). Modugno e i suoi principali uomini illustri [Modugno and its main distinguished men] (in Italian). Bari: Tip. F. Petruzzelli e Figli.
- De Lellis, Carlo (1663). Discorsi Delle Famiglie Nobili Del Regno Di Napoli, Volume 2 [Discourses Of The Noble Families Of The Kingdom Of Naples, Volume 2] (in Italian). Napoli: Stampa Francesco Paci. Archived from the original on January 9, 2021.
- De Rosa, Francesca (2014). Illuminismo e "arte della guerra" nel regno di Napoli [Enlightenment and the “art of war” in the kingdom of Naples] (in Italian). ISBN 978-84-617-1675-3.
- De Stefano, Rocco (1979). "Memoria contenente una breve idea del meccanismo e dei resultamenti del trappeto all'uso provenzane nel 1828" [Memoir containing a brief idea of the mechanism and results of the oil mill in the Provençal use in 1828]. Il Contributo di Pietro Ravanas all'agricoltura meridionale dell'Ottocento, in atti del convegno nazionale di studi sul rilancio dell'agricoltura nel III centenario della nascita di Sallustio Bandini [The Contribution of Pietro Ravanas to Nineteenth-Century Southern Agriculture, in Proceedings of the National Conference of Studies on the Revival of Agriculture in the III Centenary of the Birth of Sallustio Bandini] (in Italian). Siena: Monte dei Paschi di Siena.
- De Rossi, Giovanni Battista Nitto; Nitti di Vito, Francesco (1897). Le pergamene del duomo di Bari [The parchments of the Bari cathedral] (in Italian). Trani: Vecchi.
- Dell'Aquila, Carlo; Carofiglio, Francesco (1985). Bari extra moenia: Insediamenti rupestri ed ipogei [Bari extra moenia: Rupestrian settlements and hypogea] (in Italian). Bari.
- Demarco, Domenico (1970). La proprietà fondiaria in provincia di Bari al tramonto del sec. XVIII, in "I convegno di studio sulla Puglia nell'età risorgimentale" [Land ownership in the province of Bari in the twilight of the 18th century, in “I conference of study on Apulia in the age of the Risorgimento.”] (in Italian). Bari: Laterza.
- Di Castiglione, Ruggiero (2011). La massoneria nelle Due Sicilie e i fratelli meridionali del '700. Roma: Gangemi.
- Dina, Achille (1921). Isabella d'Aragona Duchessa di Milano e di Bari. Milano: Archivio storico lombardo.
- Faenza, Vito (1899). La vita di un comune dalla fondazione del Vicereame Spagnuolo alla Rivoluzione francese del 1789 [The life of a municipality from the founding of the Spanish Viceroyalty to the French Revolution of 1789] (in Italian). Trani: Vecchi.
- Ferrorelli, Nicola (1914). Il Ducato di Bari sotto Sforza Maria Sforza e Ludovico il Moro], Archivio Storico Lombardo, anno XLI, Serie V, Parte seconda [The Duchy of Bari under Sforza Maria Sforza and Ludovico il Moro], Lombard Historical Archives, Year XLI, Series V, Part Two] (PDF) (in Italian). Milano.
- Fonseca, Cosimo Damiano (1975). La civiltà rupestre medievale nel Mezzogiorno d'Italia. Ricerche e problemi. Atti del 1º Convegno internazionale di studi [Medieval rock civilization in Southern Italy. Research and problems. Proceedings of the 1st International Conference of Studies.] (in Italian).
- Galanti, Giuseppe Maria (1789). Della Descrizione geografica e politica delle Sicilie [About the Geographical and Political Description of the Sicilies] (in Italian). Napoli: i socj del gabinetto letterario. p. 30. Archived from the original on January 9, 2021.
- Garruba, Michele (1844). Serie critica de' Sacri Pastori Baresi, corretta, accresciuta ed illustrata [Critical series of the Holy Shepherds of Barese, corrected, expanded and illustrated] (in Italian). Bari: Tipografia Cannone. pp. 830–850.
- Gernone, Anna; Conte, Nicola; Ventrella, Michele (2006). Modugno. Guida turistico-culturale [Modugno. Cultural tourism guide] (in Italian). Modugno: Associazione Pro Loco di Modugno.
- Gervasio, Michele (1936). La pinacoteca provinciale di Bari [The provincial art gallery of Bari] (in Italian). Molfetta: Scuola tip. per Sordomuti dell'istituto provinciale Apicella.
- Giancaspro, Paolo (1890). La insurrezione della Basilicata e del Barese nel 1860 [The insurrection of Basilicata and Barese in 1860] (in Italian). Trani: Vecchi.
- Grelle, F. (1989). L'ordinamento territoriale della Peucezia e le forme della romanizzazione, in Archeologia e territorio, l'area Peuceta. Atti del Seminario di studi (Gioia del Colle, Museo Archeologico nazionale, 12-14 novembre 1987) [The territorial order of Peucetia and the forms of Romanization, in Archaeology and Territory, the Peucetian Area. Proceedings of the Seminar of Studies (Gioia del Colle, National Archaeological Museum, November 12–14, 1987).] (in Italian). Gioia del Colle.
- Grohman, Alberto (1969). Le fiere del Regno di Napoli in età Aragonese [The fairs of the Kingdom of Naples in the Aragonese age] (in Italian). Napoli: Istituto italiano per gli Studi Storici.
- Houben, Hubert (2009). Federico II. Imperatore, uomo, mito [Frederick II. Emperor, man, myth] (in Italian). Il Mulino. ISBN 978-88-15-13338-0.
- Ilari, V.; Crociani, P.; Boeri, G. C. (2005). Le Due Sicilie nelle guerre napoleoniche 1800-1815 [The Two Sicilies in the Napoleonic Wars 1800-1815] (in Italian). Roma: USSME. ISBN 88-87940-93-2. Archived from the original on January 9, 2021.
- La Sorsa, Saverio (1990). Storia di Puglia, volume V [History of Apulia, volume V] (in Italian). Bari: Levante.
- Labellarte, M. (1988). 1988, Modugno (Bari), via G. Carducci, in Taras Rivista di Archeologia VIII, 12 [1988, Modugno (Bari), via G. Carducci, in Taras Magazine of Archaeology VIII, 12] (in Italian).
- Lavermicocca, Nino (2001). I sentieri delle grotte dipinte [The paths of the painted caves] (in Italian). Bari: Laterza. ISBN 88-421-0669-0.
- Lorenzi, Giabattista (1826). Raccolta di melodrammi giocosi scritti nel secolo XVIII [Collection of playful melodramas written in the 18th century] (in Italian). Milano: Soc. Tipogr. Dei Classici Italiani. Archived from the original on January 9, 2021.
- Macina, Raffaele (1985). Il 1799 in provincia di Bari [1799 in the province of Bari] (in Italian). Modugno: Nuovi Orientamenti.
- Macina, Raffaele (1993). Modugno nell'età moderna [Modugno in the modern age] (in Italian). Modugno: Nuovi Orientamenti.
- Macina, Raffaele (2001). Accadde a Modugno nel febbraio del ... [It happened in Modugno in February of ...] (PDF) (in Italian). Modugno: Nuovi Orientamenti. p. 5. Archived from the original (PDF) on March 19, 2021.
- Macina, Raffaele (2010). La Puglia dall'Unità d'Italia al fascismo [Apulia from the Unification of Italy to Fascism] (in Italian). Modugno: EDIZIONI NUOVI ORIENTAMENTI. ISBN 978-88-95393-10-0.
- Macina, Raffaele (2011). L'unità d'Italia in Terra di Bari. Un caso particolare. Modugno fra il 1860 e il 1861 [The unification of Italy in the Land of Bari. A special case. Modugno between 1860 and 1861] (in Italian). Modugno: Nuovi Orientamenti. ISBN 978-88-96722-02-2.
- Macina, Raffaele (2012). Balsignano. Dal degrado al recupero [Balsignano. From degradation to recovery] (in Italian). Modugno: Nuovi Orientamenti.
- Maffei, Vitangelo Junior (1844). "Relazione sulle cose notabili della città di Modugno, scritto nel 1774". Serie critica de' Sacri Pastori Baresi [Critical Series of Barese Sacred Shepherds] (in Italian). Bari: Tipografia Cannone.
- Magrone, Domenico (1905). Libro rosso: privilegi dell'Università di Molfetta [Red book: privileges of the University of Molfetta] (in Italian).
- Mangiatordi, Anna (2011). Insediamenti rurali e strutture agrarie nella Puglia centrale in età romana [Rural settlements and agrarian structures in central Apulia in Roman times] (in Italian). Bari: Edipuglia. ISBN 978-88-7228-612-8.
- Maresca, Giuseppe (2012). Era di Maggio. La storia stracciata [May era. The tattered story] (in Italian). Cologno Monzese (MI): Lampi di Stampa. ISBN 978-88-488-1358-7.
- Masi, Domenico (1973). Sulla riforma dei contratti agrari nei possedimenti della chiesa in Puglia nella seconda metà del secolo XVI; in: "Studi di Storia Pugliese" [On the reform of agrarian contracts in church estates in Apulia in the second half of the 16th century; in: “Studies in Apulian History”] (in Italian). Galatina.
- Melchiorre, Vito A. L'azione di governo e gli istituti giuridici del ducato barese di Isabella d'Aragona e Bona Sforza [The government action and legal institutions of the Bari duchy of Isabella of Aragon and Bona Sforza] (in Italian).
- Milano, Nicola (1979). Curiosando per Modugno: guida della citta, toponomastica, usi e costumi del passato [Wandering around Modugno: city guide, toponymy, customs and traditions of the past] (in Italian). Modugno: Centro Culturale Cattolico Mater Ecclesia.
- Milano, Nicola (1984). Modugno. Memorie storiche [Modugno. Historical Memoirs.] (in Italian). Bari: Levante.
- Moro, Katia (March 30, 2017). "La Zona Cecilia, enclave barese in territorio modugnese: "Non apparteniamo a nessuno"" [The Cecilia Zone, a Bari enclave in Modugnese territory: “We belong to no one.”]. Archived from the original on January 22, 2022.
- Norwich, John Julius (1971). I Normanni nel Sud 1016-1130 [The Normans in the South 1016-1130] (in Italian). Milano: Ugo Mursia Editore.(orig. ed. The Normans in the South 1016-1130. Longmans: London, 1967)
- Ostuni, Nicola (1987). Riforme amministrative e viabilità nel Regno di Napoli durante il periodo francese in "Villes et territoire pendant la période napoléonienne (France et Italie). Actes du colloque de Rome (3-5 mai 1984)" [Administrative Reforms and Viability in the Kingdom of Naples during the French Period in "Cities and territory during the Napoleonic period (France and Italy). Proceedings of the Rome symposium (May 3–5, 1984)"] (in Italian). Roma: École Française de Rome.
- Pagano, Filippo Maria (1835). Istoria del regno di Napoli, Volume 2 [History of the Kingdom of Naples, Volume 2] (in Italian). Palermo: Tipografia Spampinato. p. 569. Archived from the original on January 9, 2021.
- Palmarocchi, Roberto. Le riforme di Gioacchino Murat nel primo anno di regno in "Archivio Storico ItalianoVol. 72" [Joachim Murat's reforms in the first year of his reign in “Archivio Storico Italiano Vol. 72”] (in Italian). Verona: Casa Editrice Leo S. Olschki s.r.l.
- Palmieri, Nicolò (1847). Saggio storico e politico sulla Costituzione del Regno di Sicilia infino al 1816 con un'appendice sulla rivoluzione del 1820 [Historical and political essay on the Constitution of the Kingdom of Sicily until 1816 with an appendix on the revolution of 1820] (in Italian). Losanna: S. Bonamici e compagni.
- Pellegrino, Emilia (2012). Un villaggio medievale scomparso in Terra di Bari: l'insediamento fortificato di Balsignano, in Fabio Redi e Alfonso Forgione (a cura di), VI Congresso Nazionale di Archeologia Medievale [A vanished medieval village in the Land of Bari: the fortified settlement of Balsignano, in Fabio Redi and Alfonso Forgione (eds.), VI National Congress of Medieval Archaeology] (in Italian). Firenze: All'insegna del Giglio.
- Petroni, Giulio (1858). Storia di Bari [History of Bari] (in Italian). Napoli: Editore Fibreno.
- Pirro, Federico (November 23, 2020). "E il patto industriale avviò la storia economica della Puglia in crescita" [And the industrial pact started the economic history of growing Apulia] (in Italian). Archived from the original on May 10, 2021.
- Pispisa, Enrico. "Berardo di Castagna (di Castacca)" [Berardo of Castagna (of Castacca)] (in Italian). Archived from the original on March 19, 2021.
- Polito, Francesco (1934). Per la Storia di Palo [For the History of Palo] (in Italian). Palo del Colle: Tipografia Liantonio.
- Porzio, Camillo (1565). La congivra de' Baroni del Regno di Napoli contra il Re Ferdinando I [The conspiracy of the Barons of the Kingdom of Naples against King Ferdinand I] (in Italian). Roma.
- Quagliuolo, Federico (December 9, 2020). "Il banchetto di Bona Sforza e Sigismondo di Polonia: la festa di matrimonio che finì nella Storia" [The banquet of Bona Sforza and Sigismund of Poland: the wedding party that ended up in History] (in Italian). Archived from the original on March 19, 2021.
- Ravanas, Pierre (1845). Memoria sulle innovazioni introdotte nel modo di macinar le ulive in provincia di Bari [Memoir on the innovations introduced in the way of grinding olives in the province of Bari] (in Italian). Bari: tipografia Sante Cannone e figli.
- Ruccia, Michele (1984). "La regina Bona e Modugno". Bona Sforza regina di Polonia e duchessa di Bari [Bona Sforza queen of Poland and duchess of Bari] (in Italian). Bari: Levante.
- Ruta, R. (1968). I resti della "centuriatio" romana in provincia di Bari, in "Archivio Storico Pugliese", XXI [The remains of the Roman “centuriatio” in the province of Bari, in “Archivio Storico Pugliese,” XXI] (in Italian).
- Ruta, Raffaele (1984). "Modugno e il suo umland: approccio ad un metodo di ricerca". Archivio Storico Pugliese, XXXVII [Apulian Historical Archives, XXXVII] (in Italian).
- Ruta, Raffaele (1989). Una indagine di topografia storica. La viabilità antica nella Peucezia, in Bari Economica, 1 [A survey of historical topography. The ancient road system in Peucetia, in Bari Economica, 1] (in Italian).
- Saliani, Giambattista (1899). "Cronaca dei fatti avvenuti in Modugno nel 1799". La vita di un comune dalla fondazione del Vicereame Spagnuolo alla Rivoluzione francese del 1789 [The life of a municipality from the founding of the Spanish Viceroyalty to the French Revolution of 1789] (in Italian). Trani: Vecchi.
- Salvemini, Biagio (2006). Il territorio sghembo. Forme e dinamiche degli spazi umani in età moderna. Sondaggi e letture [The skewed territory. Forms and dynamics of human spaces in the modern age. Surveys and readings] (in Italian). Bari: Edipuglia srl. ISBN 978-88-7228-360-8. Archived from the original on January 9, 2021.
- Sanseverino, R. (2002). Basolato di antica strada in contrada Misciano, Bitonto: nota topografica, in Studi Bitontini, 74 [Paving of an ancient road in Contrada Misciano, Bitonto: topographical note, in Studi Bitontini, 74] (in Italian). Bari. ISBN 978-88-7228-361-5.
- Sanseverino, R. (2004). Contrada Misciano: prospezione archeologica e paesaggio, in Studi Bitontini, 77 [Contrada Misciano: archaeological exploration and landscape, in Studi Bitontini, 77] (in Italian). Bari. ISBN 978-88-7228-407-0.
- Schiavone, Alessia (December 3, 2015). "Bari, la labirintica Zona Industriale: 700 fabbriche in un "quartiere" nato nel 1960" [Bari, the labyrinthine Industrial Zone: 700 factories in a “neighborhood” created in 1960] (in Italian). Archived from the original on June 20, 2021.
- Schiavone, Vito. "Il Monaco di Modugno" [The Monk of Modugno] (in Italian). Archived from the original on January 9, 2021.
- Schiraldi, Francesco Antonio. "Vita e attività dell'illustre Dottor Nicola Longo di Modugno in Terra di Bari, medico e patriota" [Life and activities of the illustrious Dr. Nicola Longo of Modugno in the Land of Bari, physician and patriot] (in Italian). Archived from the original on September 7, 2023.
- Sicolo, M. (2002). "Il popolamento neolitico a NO di Bari". La preistoria della Puglia. Paesaggi, uomini e tradizioni di 8.000 anni fa [The prehistory of Apulia. Landscapes, people and traditions from 8,000 years ago.] (in Italian). Bari: Adda. ISBN 88-8082-473-2.
- Sisto, Pietro; Valerio, Sebastiano (2020). L'ultima peste: Noja 1815-16. Atti del Convegno di studi (Noicàttaro 28-29 ottobre 2016) [The last plague: Noja 1815-16. Proceedings of the Study Conference (Noicàttaro October 28–29, 2016).] (in Italian). Progedit. ISBN 978-8861944480.
- Struggibinetti, Francesco (1759). Dissertazione medico-filosofica dello abuso delle fasce, o sia de' mali, che si cagionano a' bambini per opera delle medesime [Medico-philosophical dissertation of the abuse of swaddling clothes, or rather of the evils, which are caused to children by them] (in Italian). V. Manfredi. Archived from the original on March 19, 2021.
- Touring Club Italiano (1978). Guida d'Italia. Puglia [Italy Guide. Apulia] (in Italian). Touring Editore.
- Trentadue, Nicola (1876). Cenno storico sul culto della Vergine Addolorata Patrona della Città di Modugno [Historical background on the cult of Our Lady of Sorrows Patroness of the City of Modugno] (in Italian). Bari.
- Triggiani, Maurizio (2008). Insediamenti rurali nel territorio a nord di Bari. Repertorio dei siti e delle emergenze architettoniche [Rural settlements in the territory north of Bari. Directory of sites and architectural landmarks.] (in Italian). Bari: Edipuglia. ISBN 978-88-7228-526-8.
- Ughelli, Ferdinando (1655). Difesa della nobiltà napoletana [Defense of the Neapolitan nobility] (in Italian). Roma: l'herede di Manelfo Manelfi.
- Valente, Angela (1976). Gioacchino Murat e l'Italia meridionale [Joachim Murat and Southern Italy] (in Italian). Torino: Einaudi.
- Valente, Franco. "A Bologna, sulle tracce di Giacomo Caldora" [In Bologna, on the trail of Giacomo Caldora] (in Italian).
- Vallardi. Dizionario del Risorgimento Italiano - Vol. III [Dictionary of the Italian Risorgimento - Vol. III.] (in Italian). Milano.
- Ventrella, Michele (1980). La terra di Modugno: Sviluppo urbanistico e pubblica amministrazione tra il XV e il XVIII secolo in Nuovi Orientamenti anno II n.4 [The land of Modugno: Urban development and public administration between the 15th and 18th centuries in New Orientations Year II No. 4] (in Italian).
- Ventrella, Michele (2006). "Le fiere". Memoria e storia della chiesa Maria Santissima Annunziata di Modugno. Catalogo della mostra documentaria e iconografica [Memory and history of the Maria Santissima Annunziata Church in Modugno. Catalog of the documentary and iconographic exhibition.] (in Italian). Bari: Litopress Industria Grafica.
- Viterbo, Michele (1987). Il Sud e l'Unità [The South and Unification] (in Italian). Bari-Roma: Laterza. ISBN 88-420-2879-7.
- Zuccagni-Orlandini, Attilio (1845). Corografia fisica, storica e statistica dell'Italia e delle sue isole [Physical, historical and statistical chorography of Italy and its islands] (in Italian). Firenze. Archived from the original on January 9, 2021.
