= Loseto =

- Neighbourhood
- Coordinates: 41°02′21″N 16°50′51″E
- Country: Italy
- region: Apulia
- Metropolitan city: Metropolitan City of Bari (BA)
- City: Bari
- Postal code: 70129

Loseto (Lusìte in Bari dialect) is a neighborhood on the outskirt of Bari, belongs to the IV municipality since 2014 (ex IV constituency).

It was an autonomous town until 1937.

== Physical geography ==
The neighborhood is located on the extreme south-western outskirts of Apulian capital, about 10 km from the center. Borders

- To the north with the Ceglie del Campo neighborhood
- to the east with the town of Valenzano
- to the south with the town of Adelfia
- to the west with the town of Bitritto

The neighborhood is divided in two zones: the old town and a recently built residential area.

== History ==
Loseto was born around the 12th century (it bore the name of Lusitum in medieval times). In the 16th century Bona Sforza, queen of Poland and Duchess of Bari, donated the fief of Loseto to her courtier Giosuè de Ruggiero, whose descendants kept it until the abolition of feudalism in 1806.

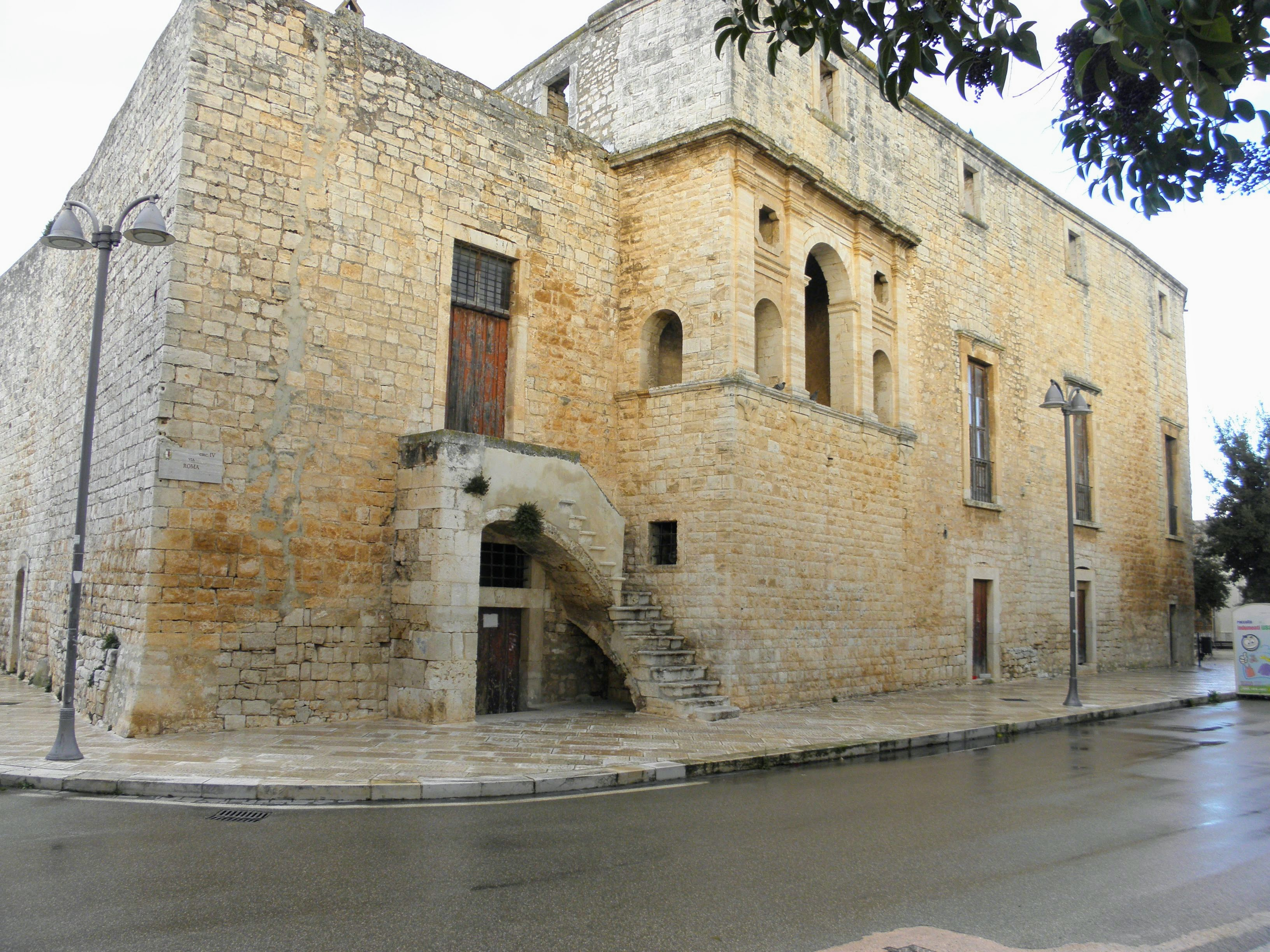
Loseto Castle

=== 20th century ===
The town of Loseto was suppressed with Royal Decree Law number 253 published on 8 February 1937 and aggregated under the form of a fraction to the town of Bari.

On 26 January 1970 the city council of Bari, with resolution 489/70, approved the subdivision of Bari into 17 districts, in whose division the Loseto district was incorporated in a distinct manner. The resolution mentioned was issued on the basis of Article 155 of Royal Decree Law number 148 of 4 February 1915, now repealed and replaced by the Consolidated Law on Local Authorities, Decreto legislativo 18 agosto 2000, n. 267, which stated verbatim: "Municipalities with more than 60,000 inhabitants, even when are divided into hamlets or fractions, they can decide to be divided into districts, in which case the Mayor has the right to delegate his functions as government official, pursuant to articles 152, 153 and 154, and to associate with the additions taken among those eligible, always with the approval of the Prefect ". This provision was also approved by the Prefect of the Province of Bari then in office, as well as by the provincial control section of the Puglia Region with protocol note number 17309/6 on 26 April 1972 with which, together with the same Prefect, the Puglia Region took note of the resolution of the Municipality of Bari, definitively approving it and making it executive.

The territory of the town of Bari, on 28 July 1979, was divided into nine administrative districts: the Loseto district was included in the fourth district which includes other districts of Bari including Ceglie del Campo and Carbonara.

== Monuments and places of interest ==
In the neighbourhood there are clear examples of an artistic and architectural nature:

- Baron's Palace,
- Loseto entrance door: recognizable and passable by those who want to enter the street of the Ceglie district;
- Church of San Giorgio: dedicated to the protector of the neighborhood, whose celebrations are held every year on 24 April.
- Seat Palace;
- Loseto Castle.

Among the ancient streets of the neighborhood, you can find the bas-reliefs made of secular vivid stone.

== Public transport ==
It is possible to reach the Loseto neighbourhood with the following public transport:

- AMTAB bus lines: 11, 11/;
- Bari ring road SS 16, exit 12.
