= Ruvo Cathedral =

Cathedral of Saint Mary of the Assumption
- Co-Cathedral of The Assumption of Mary in Ruvo di Puglia
- Duomo di Ruvo di Puglia (italian)
- Cattedrale di Santa Maria Assunta (italian)
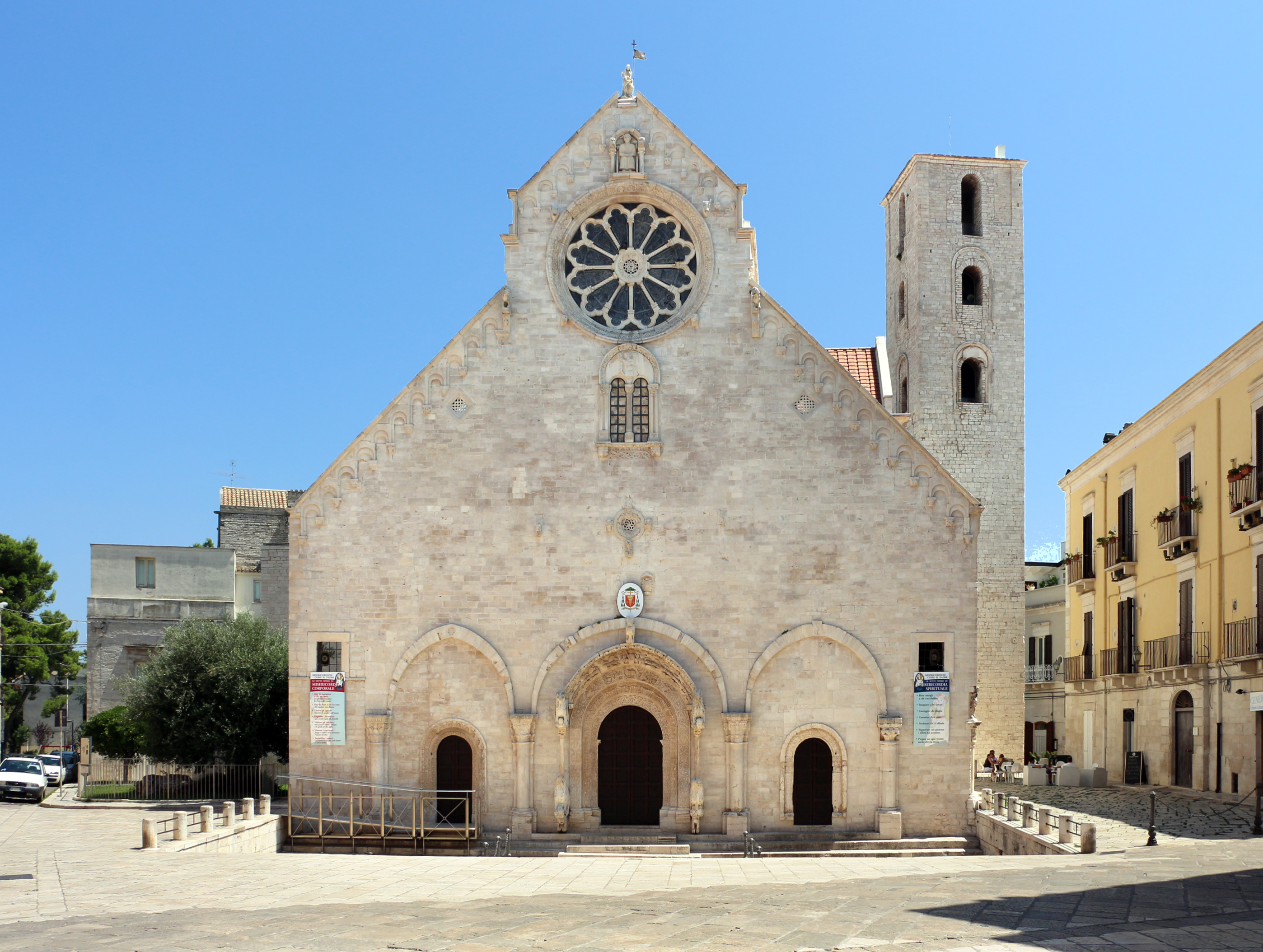
- The Cathedral's Façade of Ruvo in 2017
- Cathedral of Saint Mary of the Assumption
- 41°07′00.45″N 16°29′11.09″E
- Location: Ruvo di Puglia
- Country: Italy
- Tradition: Roman Rite
- Website: https://www.cattedraleruvo.it/

History
- Founder: Robert II of Bassavilla
- Consecrated: 13th century

Architecture
- Functional status: Co-Cathedral
- Architectural type: Apulian Romansque
- Style: Apulian Romansque
- Years built: 12th century
- Completed: 12th century

Administration
- Province: Metropolitan City of Bari
- Diocese: Diocese of Molfetta-Ruvo-Giovinazzo-Terlizzi

Cathedral of Saint Mary of the Assumption in Ruvo di Puglia (Italian: Concattedrale di Ruvo di Puglia, Concattedrale di Santa Maria Assunta, Duomo di Ruvo di Puglia) is a Roman Catholic cathedral in Ruvo di Puglia, an historic and a City of Art in Apulia, southern Italy, dedicated to the Assumption of the Virgin Mary. Formerly the episcopal seat of the Diocese of Ruvo, it is now a co-cathedral in the Diocese of Molfetta-Ruvo-Giovinazzo-Terlizzi. The building is an important example of late Apulian Romanesque architecture, built between the 12th and 13th centuries, with several later alterations.

== History ==
Ferdinando Ughelli in his Sacra Italia reports two different hypotheses regarding the construction of the first church in Ruvo. According to some, in fact, the first Christian religious building was built above the crypt of Saint Anacletus outside the city walls; according to others, however, the first church was built by Saint Anaceltus and dedicated to Saint Peter, built not too far from the current site of the Cathedral. However Ughelli himself erroneously identifies in the year 1000 the moment of foundation of the mother church. Ettore Bernich instead believes that Ruvo, as well as Bari and Conversano, had three cathedrals of which the first was the church of the Holy Trinity, the second that of Saint John and finally the present Cathedral of the Assumption.

Most likely it was decided by Robert II of Bassavilla, Lord of Ruvo, together with bishop Daniele to definitively build a cathedral after the city was razed to the ground by the barbarian invasions and the war events of the twelfth century. The works ended in the 13th century.

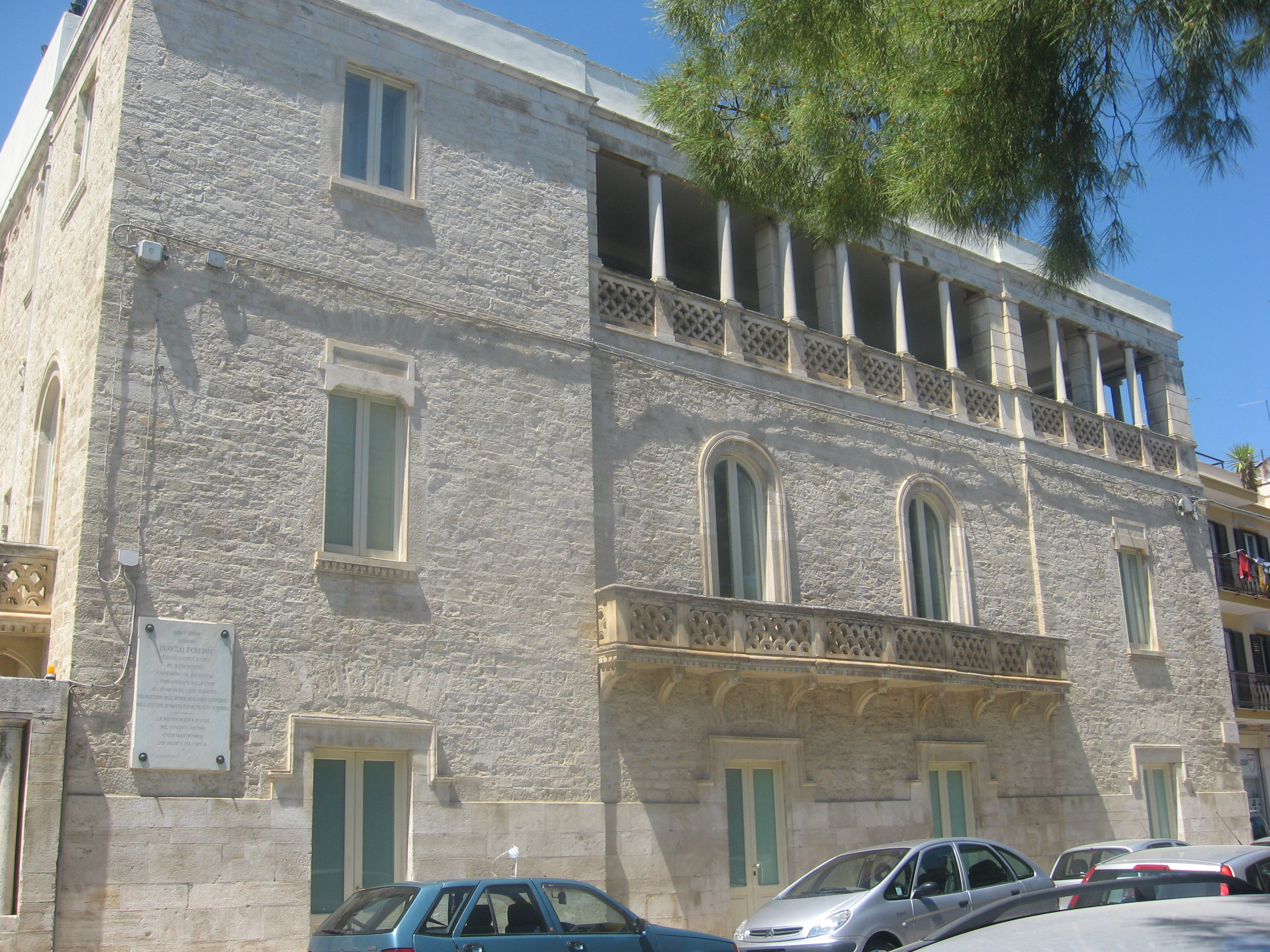
The Episcope.

In the modern age the Cathedral underwent various changes so much so that, as emerges from the ad limina reports of Bishop Gaspare Pasquali, in 1589 it could count on twelve side altars which later became fourteen. Despite the numerous altars and the existence of the sacristy and the connected episcope (we have news of the bishop's palace only from 1452), the first chapel attested by the sources dates back only to 1640: it was dedicated to the cult of the Blessed Sacrament, which it took care of the homonymous brotherhood founded in 1543 and now no longer existing. To this chapel was added a second one consecrated to the cult of Saint Blaise and his relics, both located on the left aisle. In the seventeenth century the clergy came into continuous conflict with the House Carafa, which acquired the fief of Ruvo in 1510 with Cardinal Oliviero Carafa. Under the dominion of the Duke of Andria and Count of Ruvo, Lord Ettore Carafa senior, the high altar was demolished to replace it with the throne of the Count himself. However in 1697 a new altar was built while in 1725 the bishop Bartolomeo Gambadoro rebuilt and enlarged the episcopal palace. Even in the first half of the eighteenth century the Cathedral was subject to expansion works: in 1744 the façade was lengthened by 2.40 meters (7 ft) per side and under the episcopate of Giulio De Turris the mother church was equipped in 1749 with a decorated wooden false ceiling and three canvases by Luca Alvese, also presented various chapels on both aisles: on the left aisle there were the chapels of the choir at night, of the Crucifix, of Saint Blaise, of the Blessed Sacrament and of Saint Lawrence, while on the right were builds the chapels of the Lady of Sorrows, the Saints Cosmas and Damian, the Lady of Constantinople the Archangel Michael and the Madonna of Pompeii.

In the first half of the twentieth century the aim was to eliminate all the aggregations and structural additions of the Baroque era, trying to restore the original church. Between 1901 and 1925 a new ciborium was built on the model of that of the Basilica di San Nicola in Bari by Ettore Bernich, a polychrome stained glass window depicting the Immaculate was affixed. In addition, the pedestal of the Cathedral inserted due to the difference in height of one meter between the floor of the church and the road surface due to the destruction of Ruvo in the Middle Ages was freed from the stage. In 1925 the Episcope was rebuilt by the engineer Sylos Labini. All the chapels were eliminated, the last of which, that of the Blessed Sacrament, only in 1935, thus rebuilding the wall of the two naves and giving greater internal space. In addition, the tombs of the bishops buried in the Cathedral and placed on the floor were set against the walls.

== Description ==
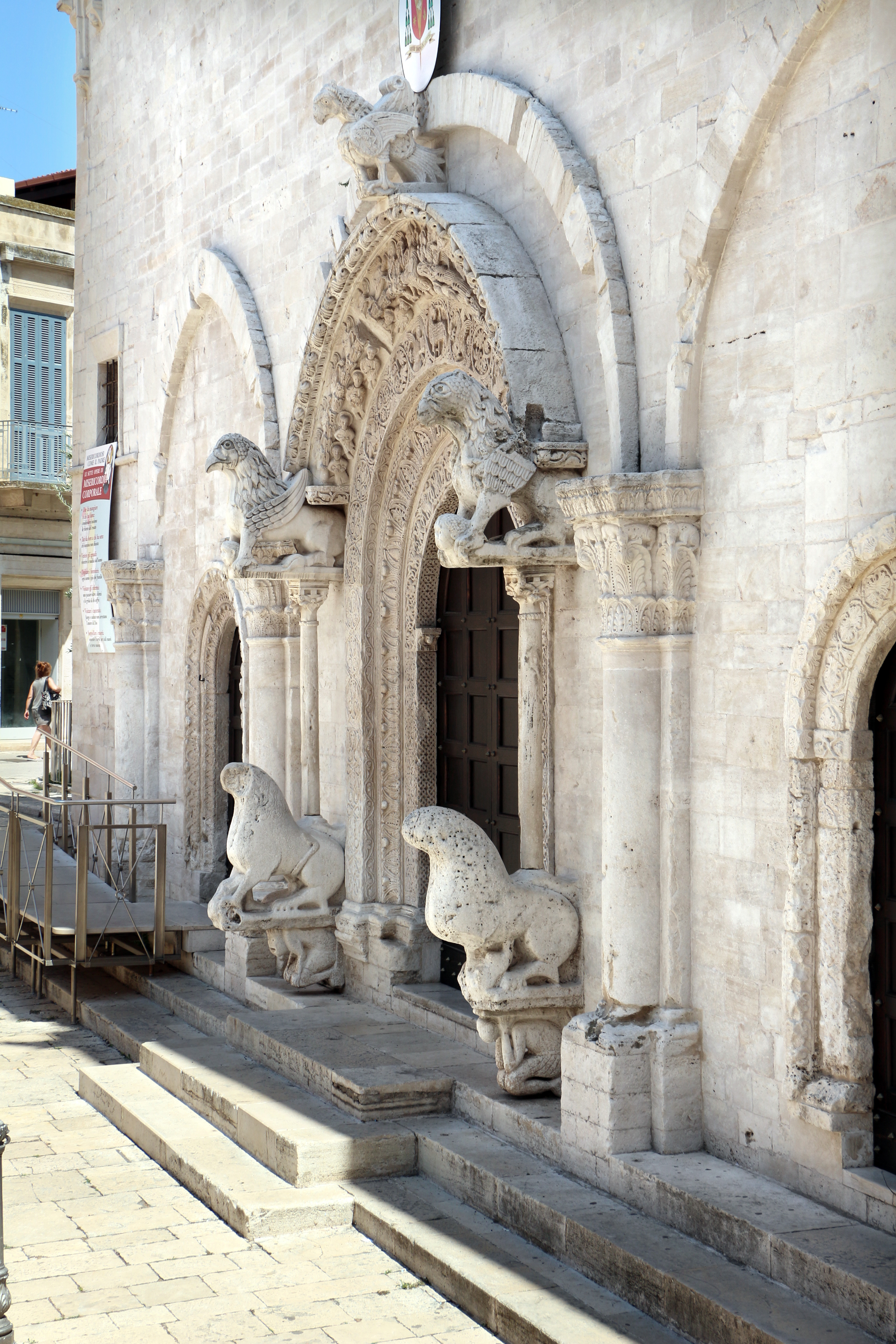
The main entrance with the arches and the griffons

=== The Façade ===
The façade is salient, typically Romanesque, with three portals by local artists: the central one is the largest and is enriched with bas-reliefs on the intrados. The external arch depicts Christ flanked by two pilgrims, the Vergin Mary and St. John the Baptist and around them are arranged angelic figures and the twelve apostles. The figure of the Agnus Dei (symbol of Christ's innocence) is central in the second arch, flanked by the symbols of the four Evangelists. In the internal arch two peacocks are sculpted in the act of pecking a bunch of grapes, the symbol of the Eucharist. The central portal is also flanked by two small columns surmounted by griffins (symbols of the flight of the soul towards God) which rest on column-bearing lions (symbolically guarding the church) in turn supported by telamons. The two smaller and poorer side portals are identified by two half columns which provide the support for two pointed arches.

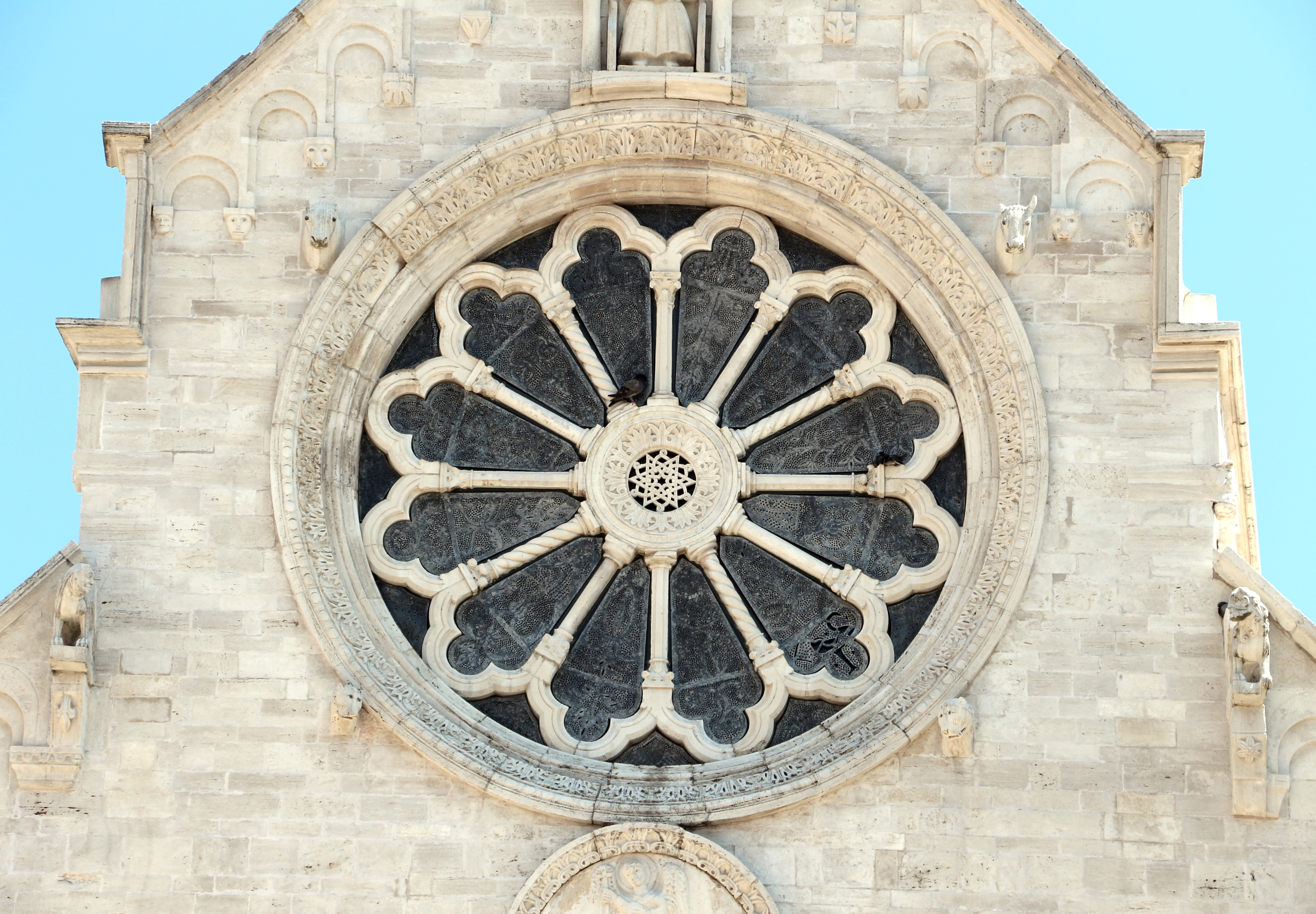
Rose window on the façade. (1237)

The façade is adorned with various stone artefacts and finds its best decoration in a mullioned window with the bas-relief of the Archangel Michael defeating the devil preceded by a small perforated central rose window and surrounded by demonic and angelic creatures. There are various hanging arches with human, zoomorphic and phytomorphic figures. The large rose window with twelve columns, worked in various ways and superimposed on a metal sheet worked very finely in the tunnel in a local workshop, dating back to the sixteenth century, is the protagonist of the façade. Above the rose window is the seated enigmatic figure identified by some as Robert II of Bassavilla (the financier of the church). At the top of the façade there is the statuette of Christ the Redeemer holding a wind vane flag.

=== Interior ===
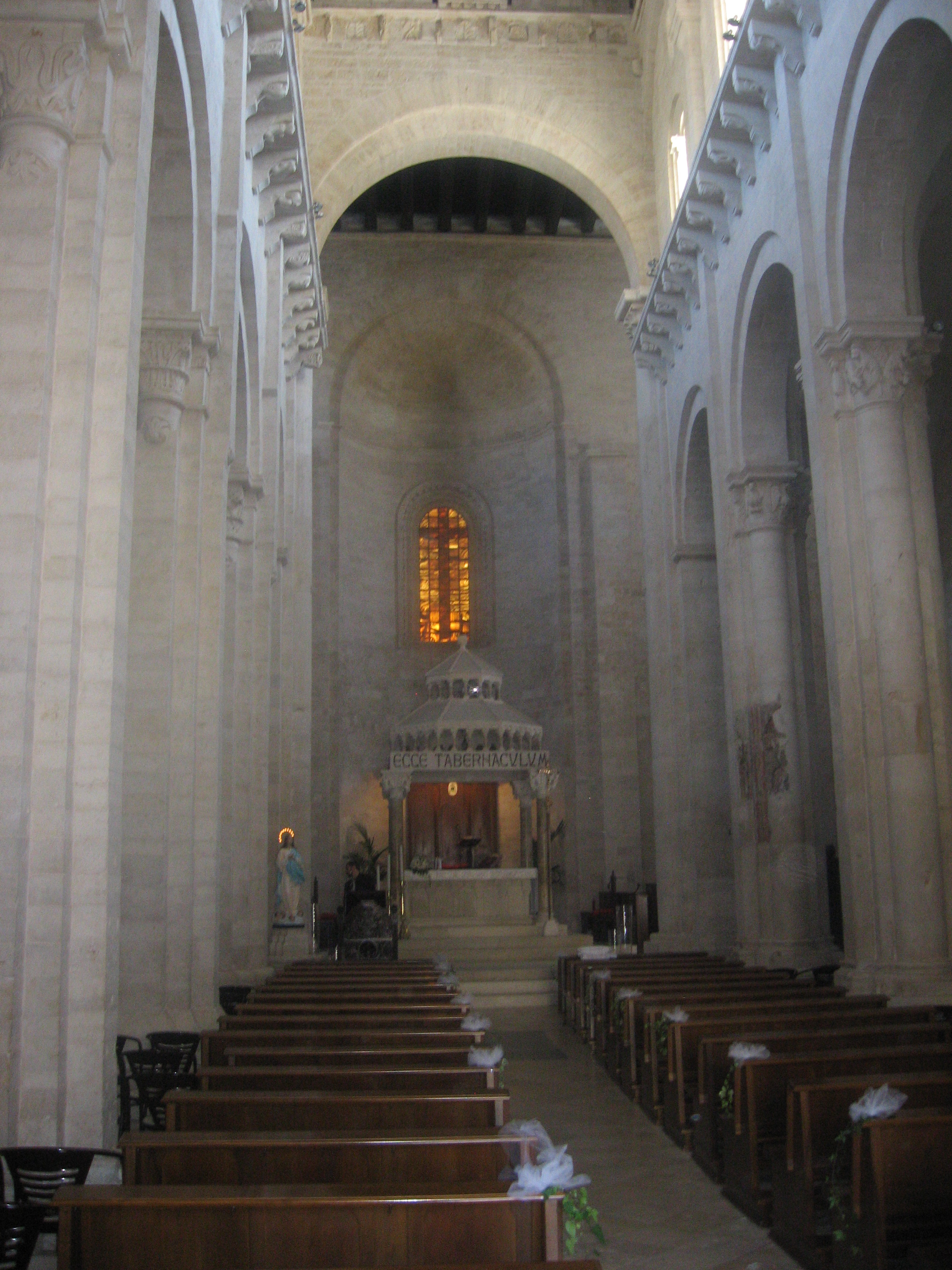
Central Nave of the Cathedral

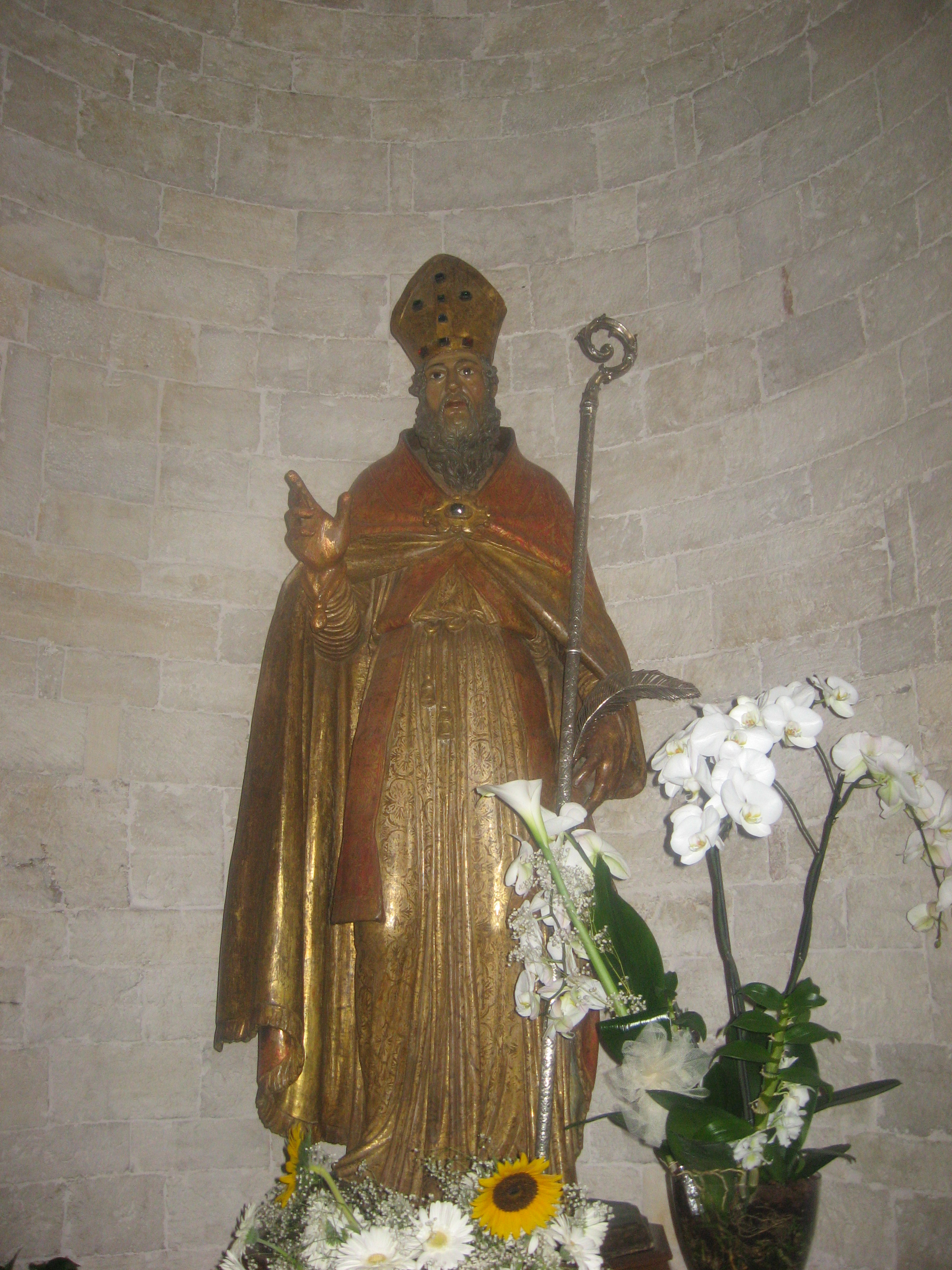
Wooden Statue of Saint Blaise, patron of the city, It is carried in procession during the patronal feast of February 3.

The interior is divided into three naves, leading into three apses, and a transept to the naves thus following the Latin cross plan. The central nave is the largest and is surrounded at the top by a false balcony (it is actually an internal corbel-cornice) which rests on two rows of columns, each one different from the other and of different origins. Furthermore, the columns on the right are cruciform and of greater artistic value than the square ones on the left. On the right columns are represented scenes and stories whose protagonists are mythological men or animals while on the left ones there are floral motifs. At the end of the central nave there is the beautiful ciborium built in the nineteenth century to a design by the architect Ettore Bernich and which is inspired by that of the Basilica of San Nicola in Bari. Furthermore, the central nave and the transept are covered by a trussed roof, while the aisles have a cross vault.

The current appearance of the building is the result of the restorations of the early twentieth century which were carried out in the name of a return to medieval forms. With the restorations almost all the chapels were demolished and of these works only two recesses remain in the left aisle and are the niche of the Sacred Heart of Jesus (19th century) and the current chapel of the Blessed Sacrament (not to be confused with the historic Cappellone entitled to the same cult).

Numerous works of art are kept: the polychrome and carved wooden statue of Saint Blaise, patron saint of the city, fine 16th century cabinet-making work finely worked with gold foil, represents the saint in a bishop's dress with a crosier coming from the Neapolitan goldsmith's and donated by the bishop Andrea Taccone; the reliquary of the same saint of Sebaste in silver; a fresco depicting the Virgin and Child with Saint Sebastian dating back to the 15th century, the signed ZT panel of the Virgin of Constantinople commissioned by the House of Pagano-De Leo; the splendid wooden crucifix from the 16th century; the 16th century stone statue of Saint Lawrance; the 15th century fresco of the Virgin enthroned with the Child and the Martyrdom of St. Sebastian; a canvas from the workshop of Marco Pino da Siena depicting the Adoration of the shepherds; traces of frescoes depicting some saints and the Virgin of Mercy.

=== Treasure ===
Numerous pieces of silverware and textile manufacture (sacred vestments) are part of the treasury of the co-Cathedral; among the first there is a monstrance with a full-length cast statue of the Faith, a silver processional cross and various sacred silver furnishings such as chalices, patens and pyxes. In the Cathedral there is also a silver statue of Saint Roch the work of the Neapolitan Giuseppe Sammartino.

=== Hypogeum ===
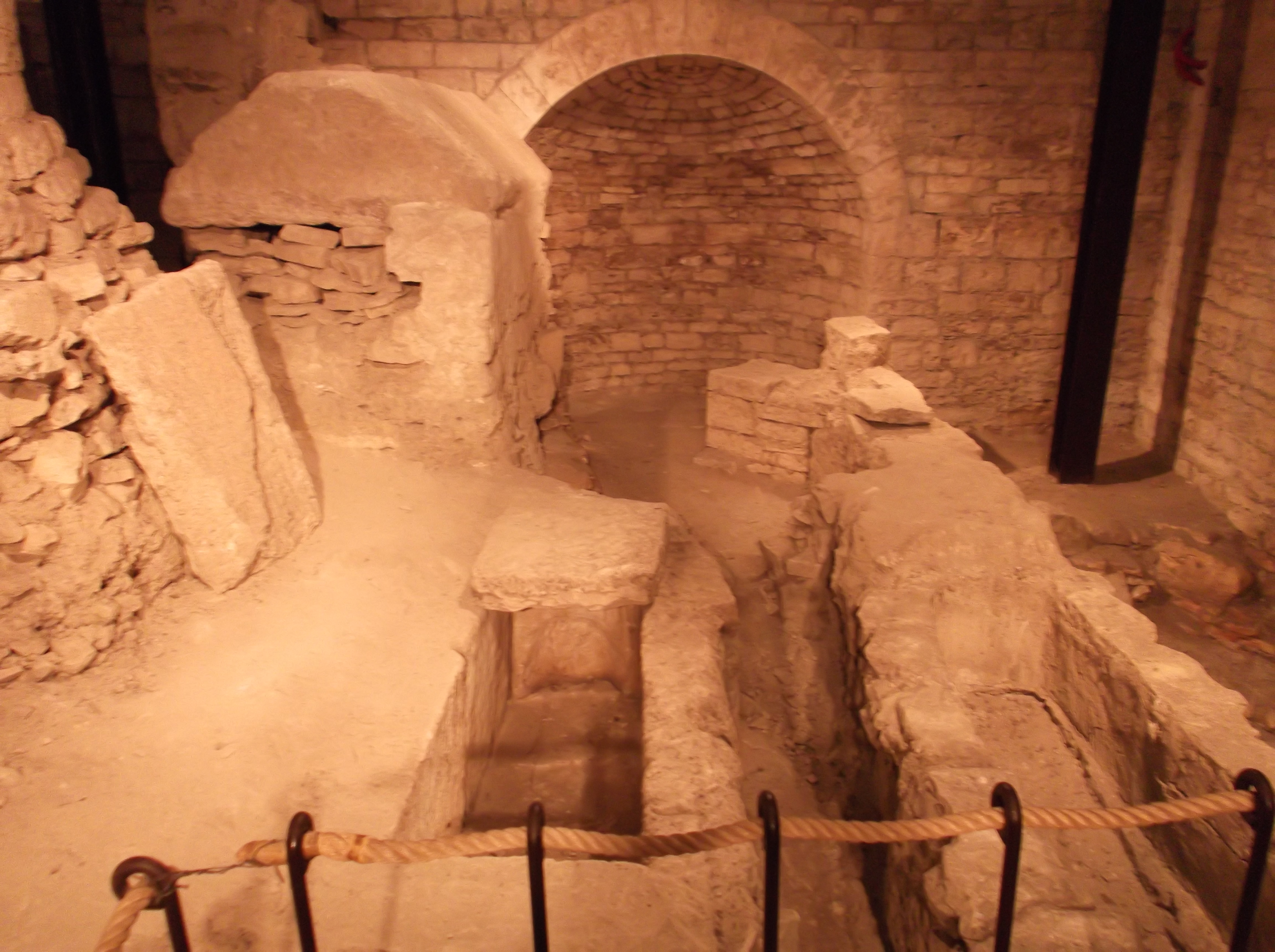
Tombs of Peucetian and Roman age found in the Ruvo Hypogeum

The underground heritage of the Ruvo Cathedral remained hidden for centuries until 1925, when some single-lancet windows emerged during the renovation works. However, in 1935, with the demolition of the chapel of the Blessed Sacrament, it was necessary to lower the floor level of the transept and aisles. However, the new pavement turned out to be continuously humid and wet, so the investigations conducted between 1974 and 1975 led to the discovery of the rich subsoil. It can therefore be assumed that the Cathedral was built on the rubble of a place that has always been frequented over the centuries by Peucetians, Romans and the medieval population. In the hypogeum, in fact, tombs dating back to these civilizations and burials of affiliated to the local brotherhoods were found. Some tombs have survived from the Peucetian age with a scarce funeral equipment but which may suggest an area used as a necropolis and inhabited due to the presence of a furnace. On the other hand, the two mosaic floors found in Roman times date back to the existence of a domus built in the 2nd century and enlarged in the 3rd. The two tombs rich in jewels come from the Middle Ages, moreover some pillars of an ancient building or church on which the Cathedral itself rests date back to the same period.

== Bell Tower ==
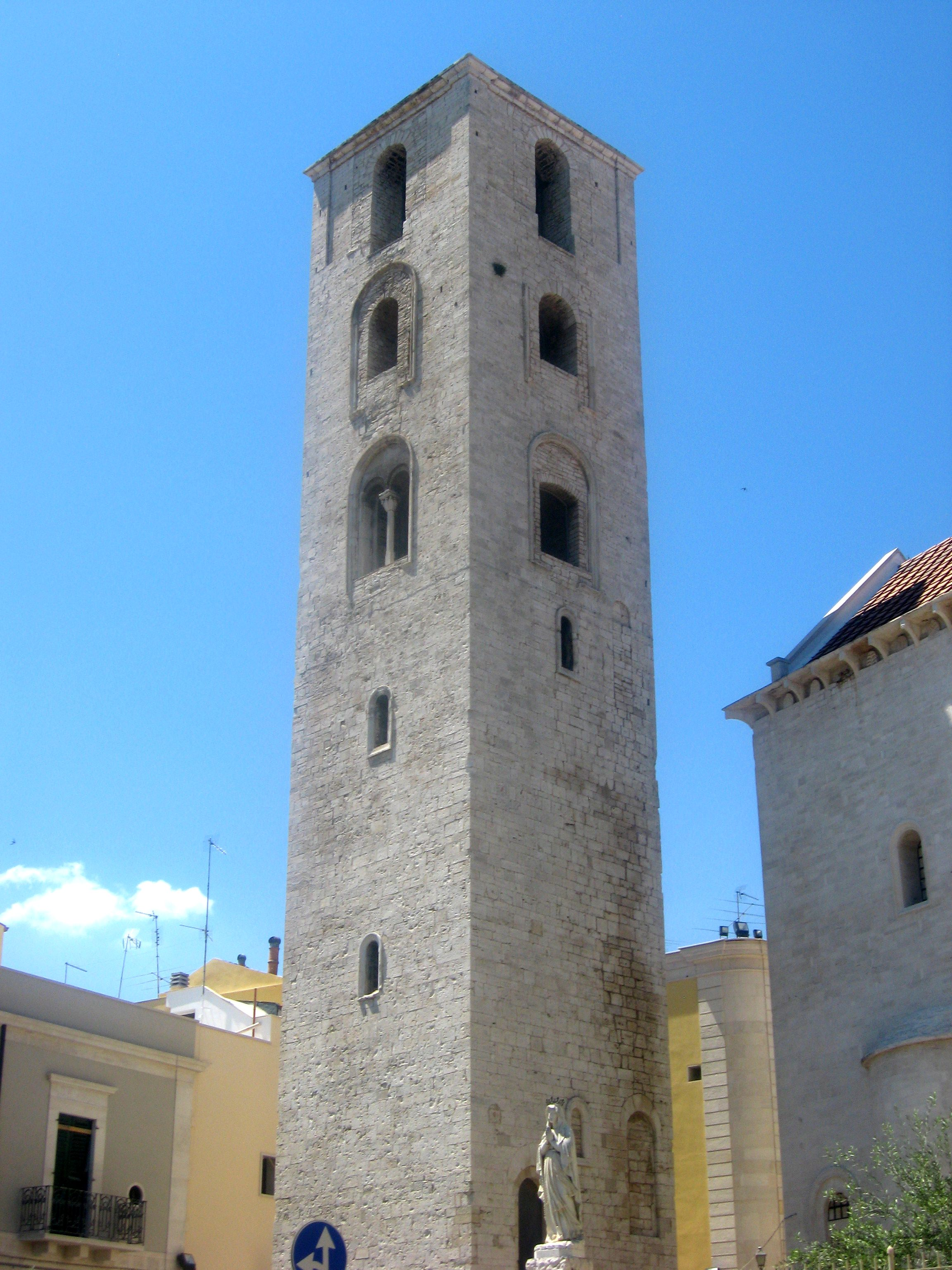
Tower Bell (year 1000)

The Bell Tower was built around the year 1000, before the Cathedral, with the function of a defensive tower and lookout so much so that from this structure it was possible to control the plain as far as the Adriatic. Initially the tower consisted of only three floors, then in the eighteenth century other two floors were added copying the style of the original architecture. The tower therefore returned to the defensive system of the ancient village of Ruvo and then became a Bell Tower with the construction of the Cathedral, whose transept is only 2.50 metres (8.2 ft) away. The building measures 6 metres (20 ft) on each side and is 36.85 metres (120.9 ft). At 5 metres (16 ft) below ground level there is a cistern for collecting rainwater, which at the time was essential for survival in the event of a siege. In the post-unification period the bell tower was declared an Italian National Monument. The tower, with a square plan, holds three bells of 18 quintals (1.8 tons).

== Gallery ==
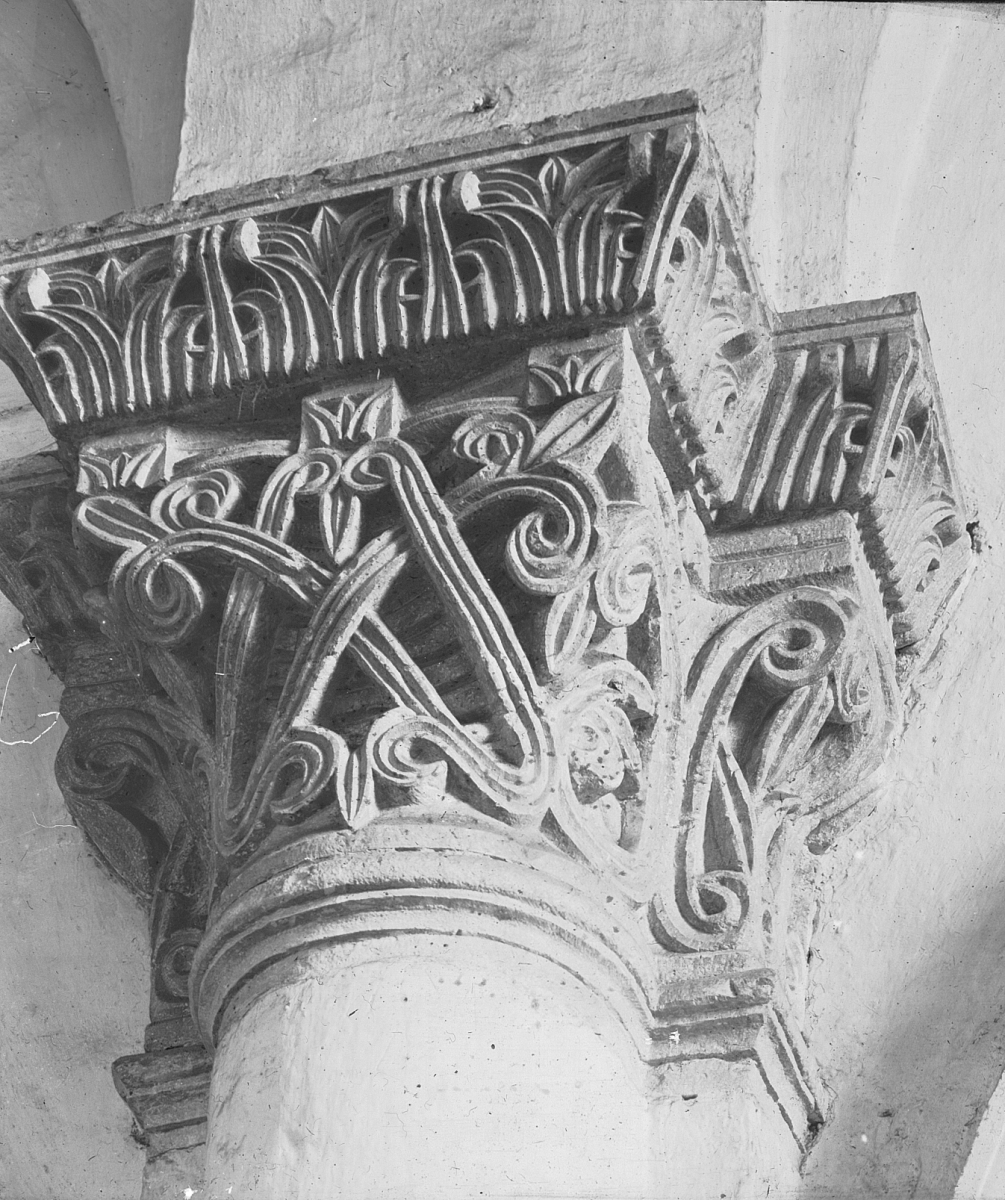
1895. Ruvo Cathedral; interior detail of capital. Brooklyn Museum Archives, Goodyear Archival Collection

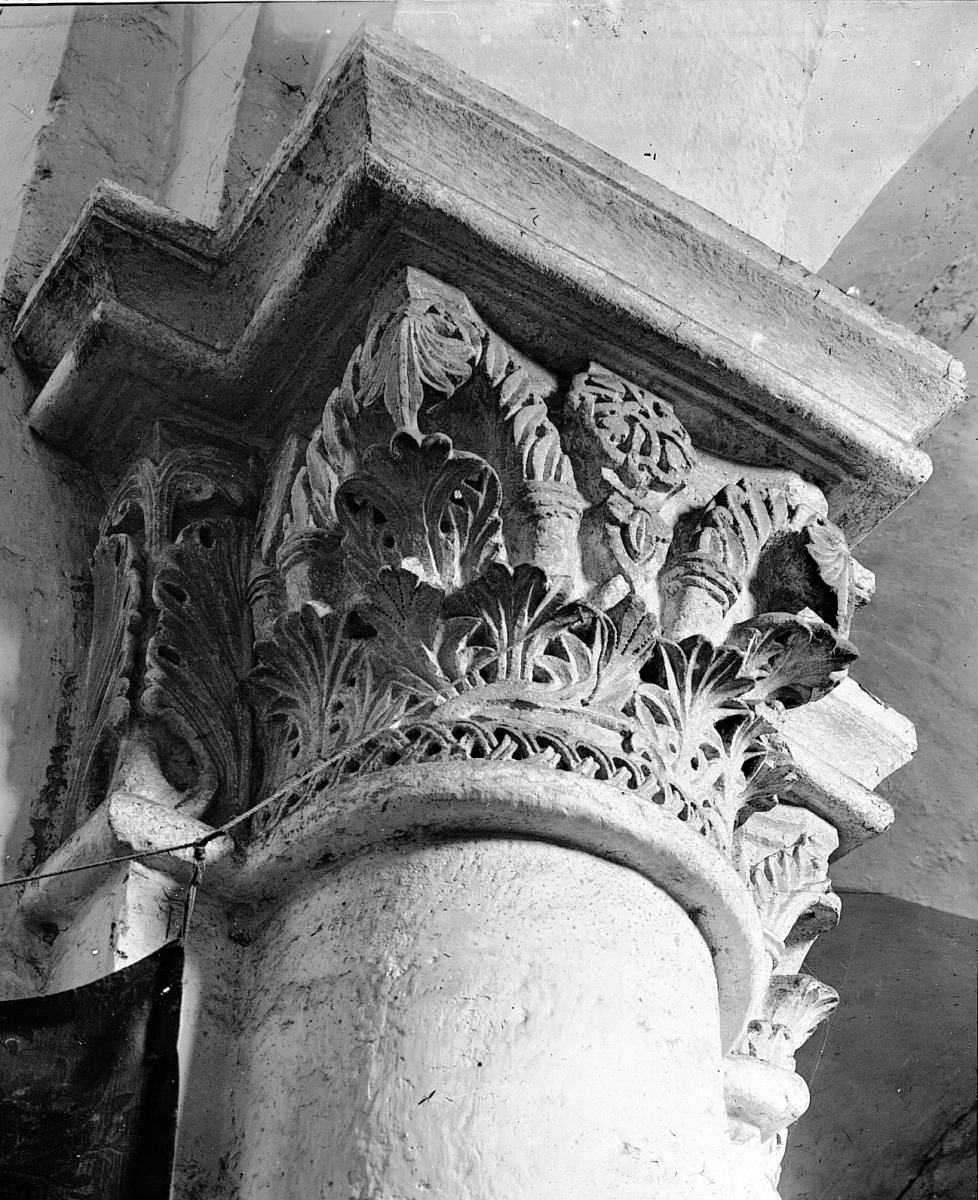
1895. Ruvo Cathedral; interior detail of capital. Brooklyn Museum Archives, Goodyear Archival Collection

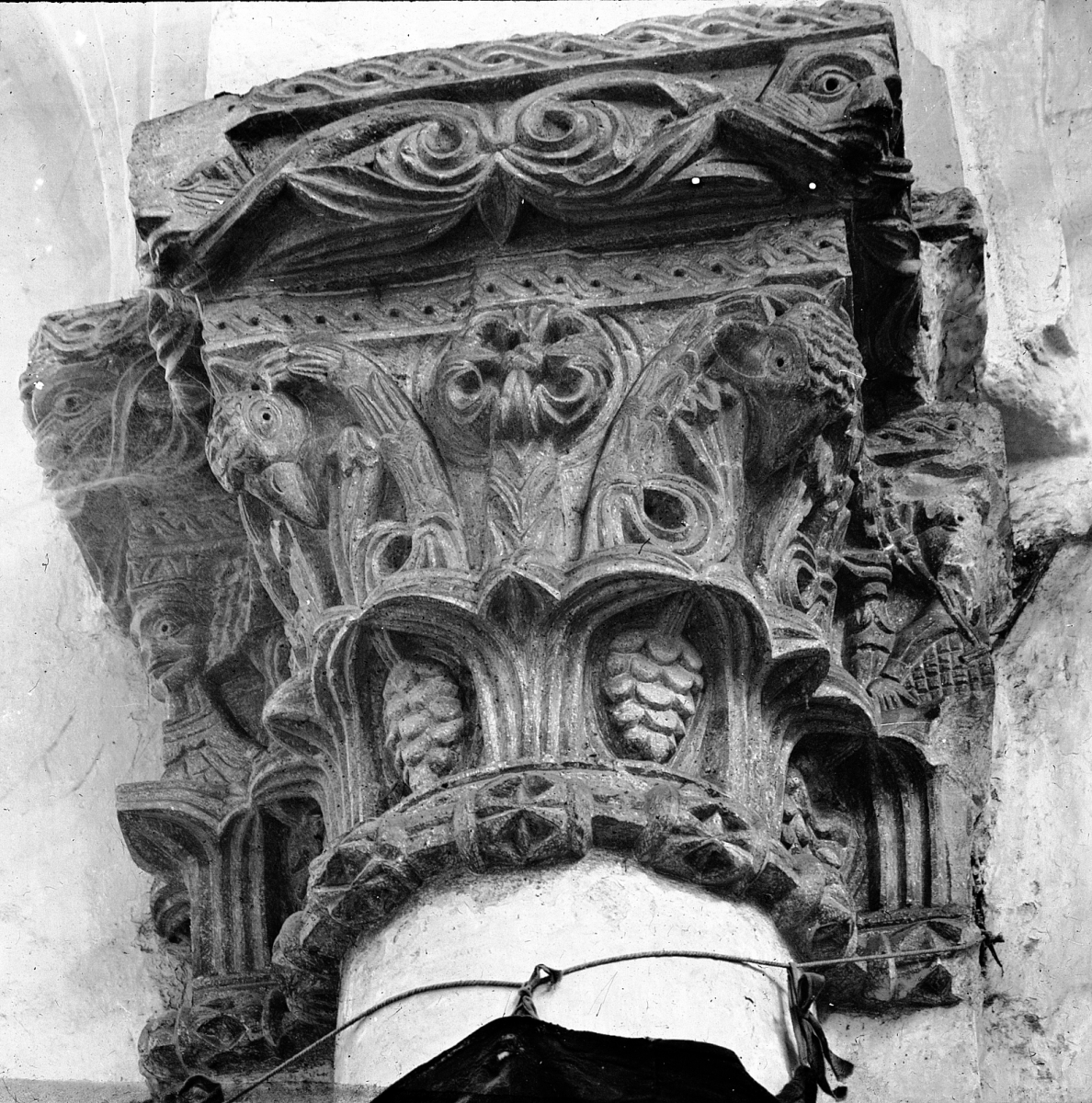
1895. Ruvo Cathedral; interior detail of capital. Brooklyn Museum Archives, Goodyear Archival Collection

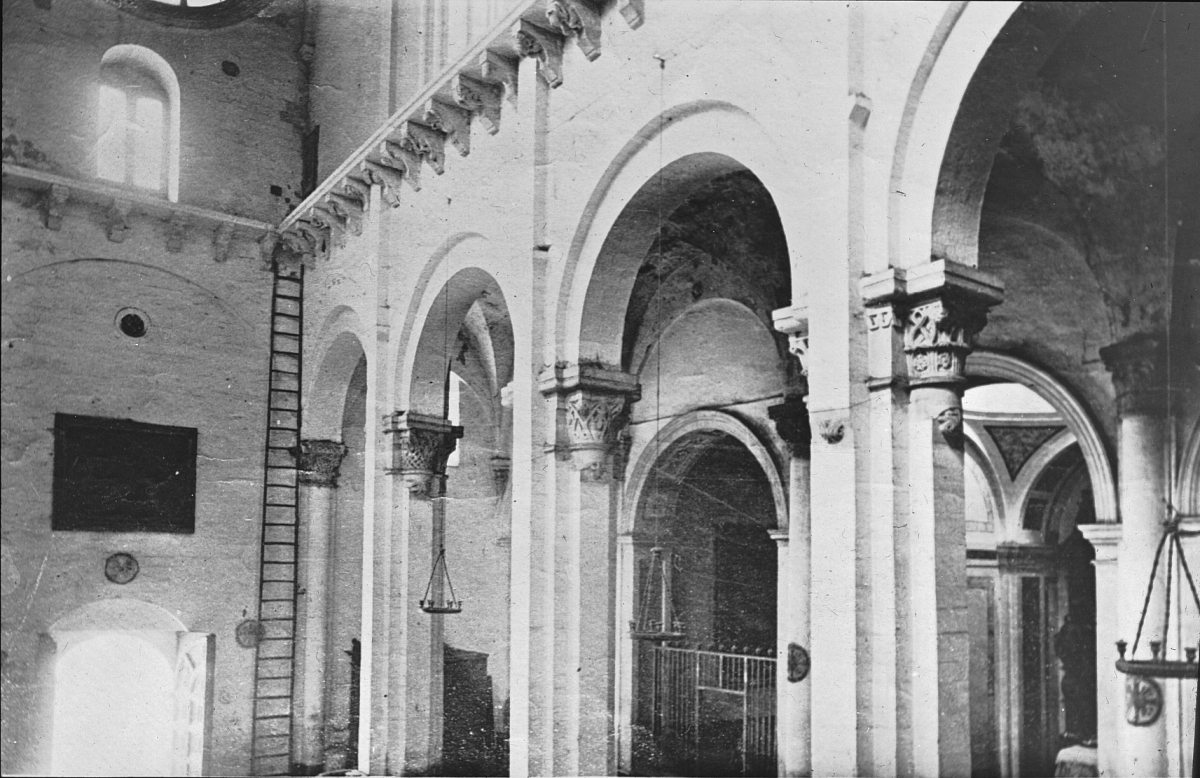
Ruvo Cathedral; interior looking toward entrance. Brooklyn Museum Archives, Goodyear Archival Collection

== See also ==
- Bitonto Cathedral
- Norman architecture
- History of Ruvo di Puglia

== Sources ==
- Cassano, R. (2001). "La cattedrale di Ruvo". Cattedrali di Puglia – Una storia lunga duemila anni. Bari. p. 154.
