= History of Ruvo di Puglia =

History of the municipality of Ruvo di Puglia, Italy

The history of Ruvo di Puglia begins with the founding of the first villages in 2000 B.C. and reaches the present day. The history of this town in the land of Bari is lost in the mists of time: little or nothing was known of its origins and history until the 19th century when prestigious vases and numerous coins from ancient times emerged from the soil of the Ruvo countryside, giving the people of Ruvo a space, time and place in history. Ruvo has existed under the rule of a number of external powers, from the Greeks to the Normans and the Bourbons.

== Toponym ==
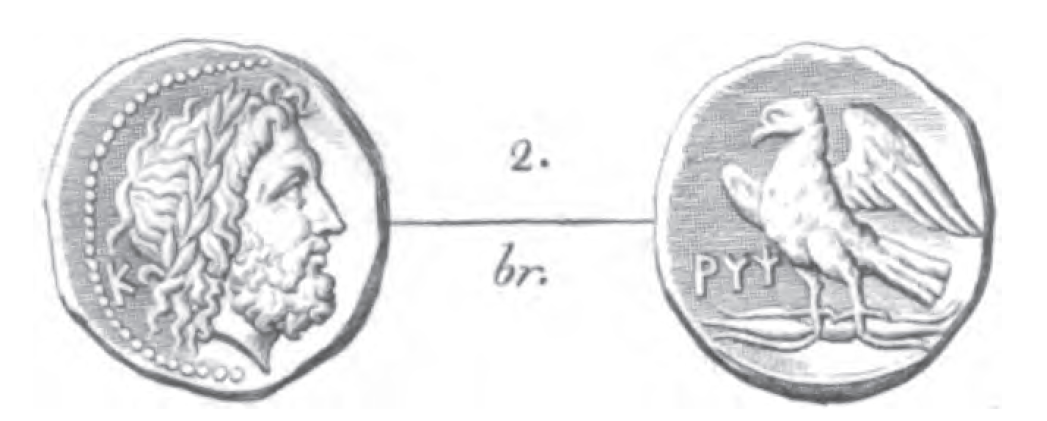
Large bronze from the mint of Ruvo; the obverse depicts Jupiter crowned with a laurel wreath, the reverse shows an eagle on lightning bolts, and the inscription ΡΥΨ, the name of the city, is shown.

Scholars of all ages have always encountered difficulties in offering a correct etymological interpretation of the name Ruvo. Salvatore Fenicia, a prolific nineteenth-century polygraph, in his Monograph of Ruvo of Magna Graecia failed to infer its derivation, citing its cause in the frequent destructions of the city that would lead, in his opinion, to a case of etymological damnatio memoriae. The same result was obtained by archaeologist Giovanni Jatta, a contemporary of Fenicia, who managed, however, to unravel some misinterpretations of the name of Ruvo in antiquity and derive the root and the Greek name of the city, to which Fenicia himself agreed. Jatta, in fact, first identified the writers of the classical world who mentioned Ruvo starting with Strabo's Netium, identifying it with a territory between Canosa and Ceglie (thus Gravina or Ruvo) and not as an unknown place, to Pliny the Elder's Rubustini (which clearly indicates the population of Ruvo) to Horace's Rubos, to Sextus Julius Frontinus rubustinus ager and ending with the misinterpretation of the Apulian Ruvo mistaken for the Lucanian Ruvo by Roberto Stefano and by the ancient commentators of Virgil and Horace who had mistaken Rubi for Ruvo del Monte and Rufris (the Latin name for Ruvo del Monte) for Ruvo di Puglia. Finally, Jatta in the introduction to his work also refuted the hypothesis of those who identified Rudiae, hometown of the Latin poet Quintus Ennius, with Ruvo since there are archaeological remains of his true homeland between Taranto and Brindisi. Of a totally adverse opinion to Jatta was Gaetano Moroni, author of the Dizionario di erudizione storico-ecclesiastica, who places among the illustrious men of Ruvo Domenico Cotugno and the poet Quintus Ennius and then identifies Ruvo with Strabo's Rudium and affixes to it the Latin name Ruben, hypothesizing the Ruvestine people as descendants of Reuben, son of Jacob.

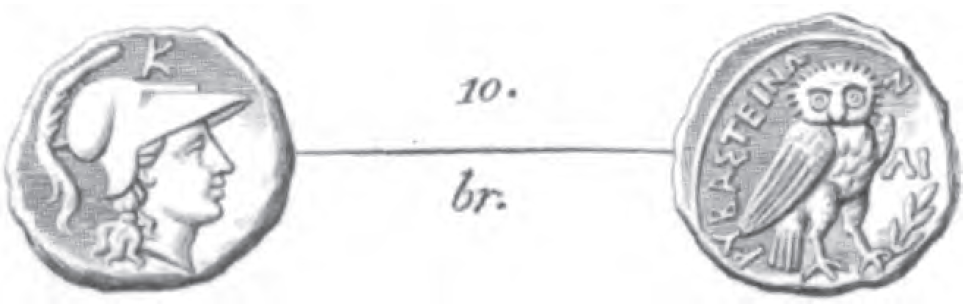
A coin of the mint of Ruvo from the Greek period; the obverse depicts helmeted Athena, and on the reverse is Athena's owl surmounted by the inscription ΡΥΒΑΣΤΕΙΝΩΝ

The name of the site is first attested on a series of coins of the 3rd century BCE, which bear legends in Greek characters: ΡΥΨ (Rhyps), ΡΥΒΑ (Rhyba), and ΡΥΒΑΣΤΕΙΝΩΝ (Rhybasteinon). In the 1st century BCE, the poet Horace referred to the inhabitants as the Rubi, and in the 1st century CE they appear in Pliny the Elder's list of the peoples of Apulia as the Rubustini. The name of the town remained Rubi throughout the Middle Ages.

The citizens of Ruvo are presently called ruvesi; however, they may also be called rubastini (from the Greek "Ῥυβαστεῖνοι," Rhybasteinoi) and ruvestini (presumably from the Latin rubustinus with the phonetic mutation of the b into v), the latter demonym may be used as a literary or higher form of ruvese.

== Ancient Ruvo ==
Inde Rubos fessi pervenimus, utpote longum
carpentes iter et factum corruptius imbri.
So we arrive tired in Ruvo, for we had survived
a long road made more miserable by rain.

— Quintus Horatius Flaccus, Sermones, Liber I - Sermo V

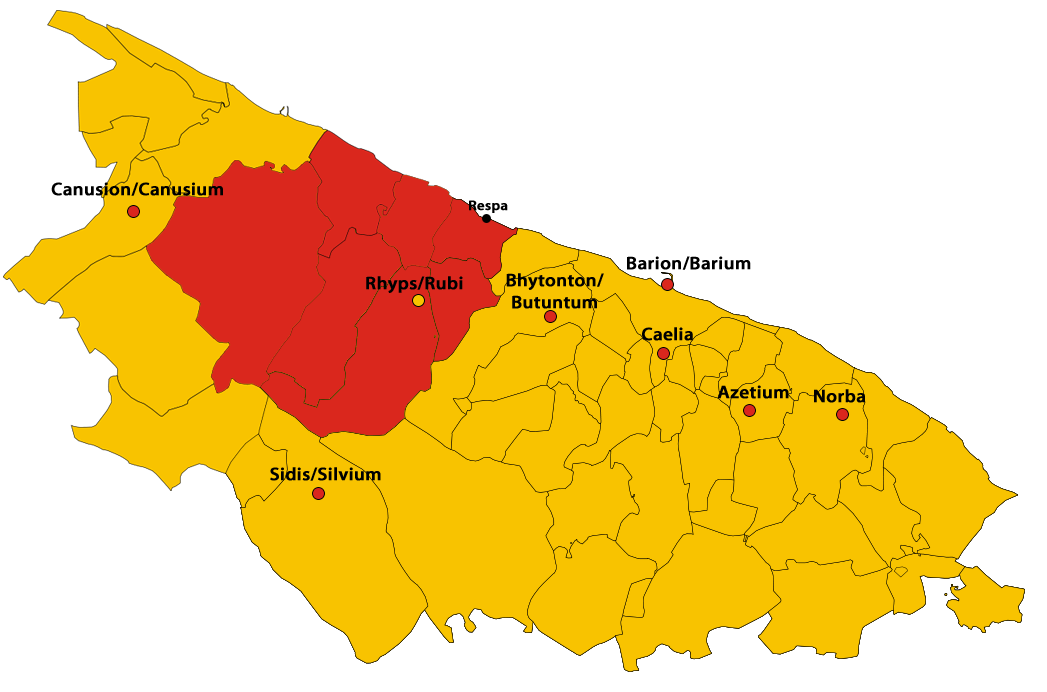
The territory of Ruvo in the 3rd century BC.

The history of Ruvo di Puglia gravitates around the fate of its countryside (ager rubustinus in Liber Coloniarum), still the third largest in the Province of Bari, which has always been divided into villages and contrade, such as the Contrada Matine in which specimens of petrified shells have been found, evidence of the antiquity of the Murgia soil and the marine formation of Apulia. Some worked stone artifacts reveal the settlement of some populations in the Ruvian countryside as early as the Middle Paleolithic, while remains of Neolithic villages prove the presence of man since the sixth millennium B.C. During the Bronze Age, the area pertaining to Ruvo di Puglia was later inhabited by the Morgetes, an Ausonian people, around 2000 B.C. and they took control of the original Ruvestine settlement in the area of the road leading from the Pulo di Molfetta to Matera, establishing a village of huts (about 14,000 inhabitants in a perimeter of 900 meters) about 15 kilometers from Ruvo. Evidence of this era is abundant and it is outlined as a village active in metal and stone working and trade, as can be inferred from a bronze axe found in Contrada Montedoro and some ornaments of the same material. With the Iron Age and the arrival of the Iapygians from Illyria, the Morgetes were forced to migrate southward. The Iapygians distinguished themselves into three different groups and cultures, the Messapians in Salento, the Peucetians in the Land of Bari, and the Daunians in the Tavoliere delle Puglie. The Peucetians therefore inherited the proto-urban settlement and founded Ruvo initially as a hilltop village where the municipal pine forest and the church of St. Michael the Archangel now stand. From a small village it soon became one of the main Peucetian cities, retaining relations with other villages, such as Sidis/Silvium (today's Gravina in Puglia), indigenous to the area and with the Etruscans to the north but also with the first colonies of Magna Graecia to the south, especially due to a maritime emporium, indicated by ancient sources as Respa, today's Cala San Giacomo in Molfetta.

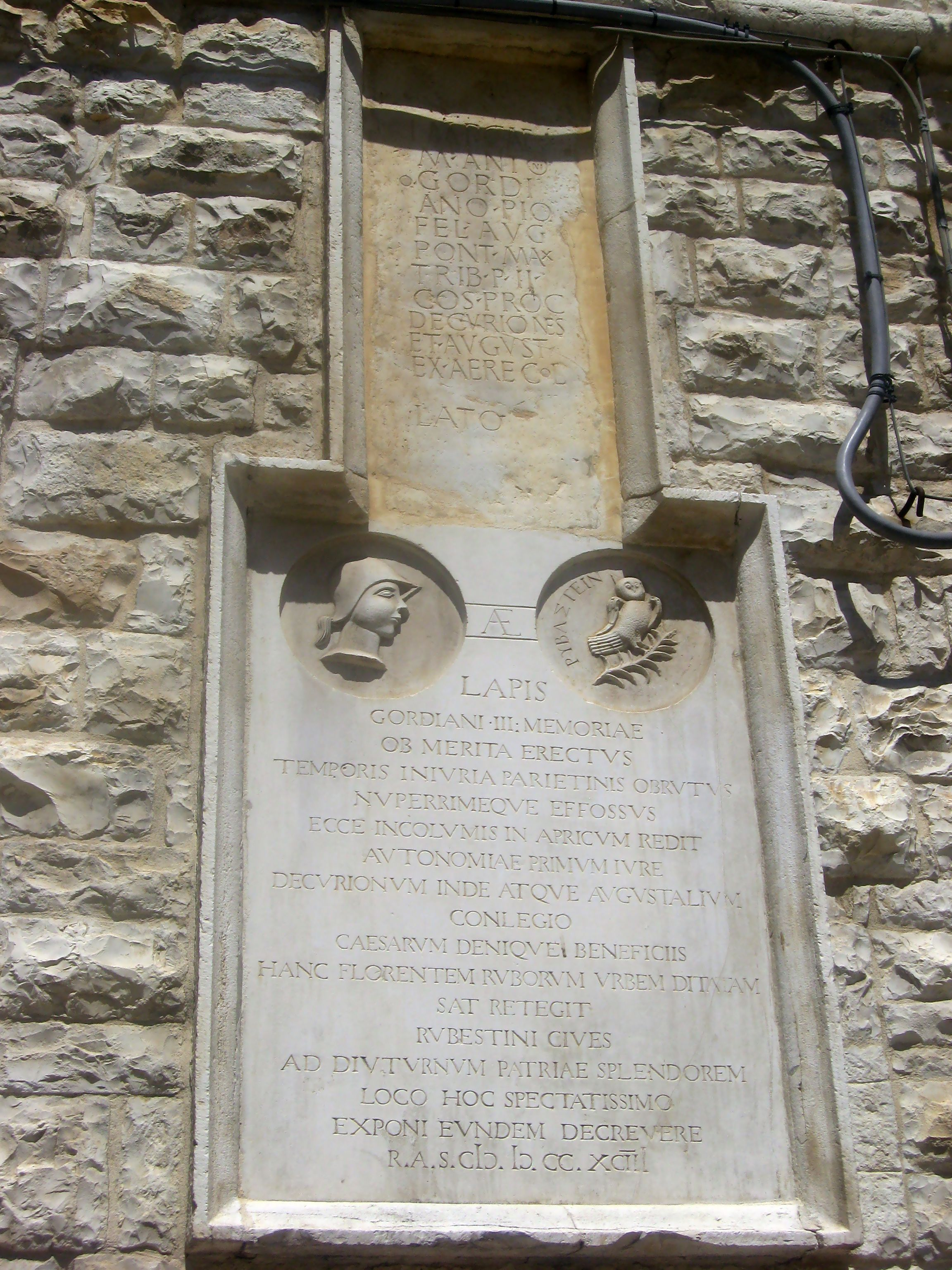
Menotti Garibaldi Square, epigraph of Gordian III

Between the 8th and 5th centuries B.C. some groups of settlers from Crete peacefully colonized the Peucetian village, overlapping and integrating with the already existing community, transforming it into an autonomous Greek city named Rhyps. With the arrival of the Greeks, the city experienced its moment of maximum splendor around the 4th century B.C., boasting a very large territory (the Ruvo countryside of the Greek era included Molfetta, Terlizzi, Corato, Trani, Bisceglie and Andria) and a population that was never reached again. Ruvo became a prosperous Greek city and its wealth was based on trade in oil and wine and a flourishing production of pottery, as evidenced by the vast necropolis in which tombs containing bronze, silver and gold objects have been found. The city first became an ally of Athens, as evidenced by some coins endowed with the helmeted Athena typical of the Attic power, reaching the height of its military might. Ruvo thus became independent, minting silver coins, and it was during this period that Ruvo received the large number of vases from Greece and gold from the trade held with the Etruscans. The necropolis played a major role in increasing the city's international reputation because of the thousands of Peucetian, Greek and Latin artifacts and the building of the ancient historical heritage forgotten until the early 20th century. The rediscovery of Ruvo's ancient history took place due to the local noble families, including the Jatta (later founders of the museum of the same name), the Caputi, the Fenicia and the Lojodice, who by setting up their own private museums curbed the buying and selling of those finds that now constitute the purest evidence of the city's past prestige in Greek times, such as the vase of Talos and the tomb of the warrior (or dancers) preserved at the National Archaeological Museum in Naples. Numerous villages also emerged in the Ruvestine countryside, including some near Calentano and the Mattine district.

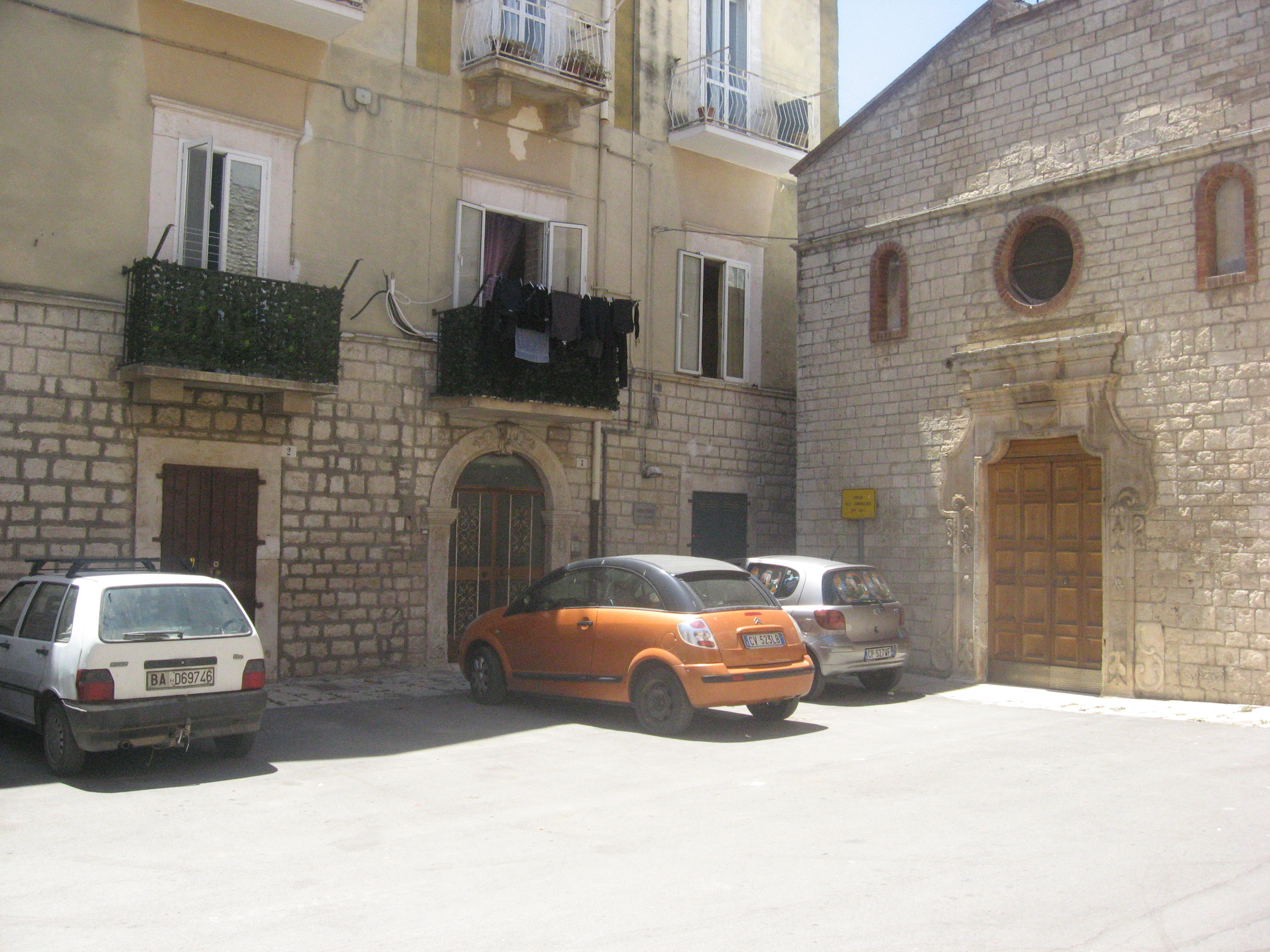
Largo Annunziata, site of the ancient Roman forum of Rubi

From 324 B.C. the city came into the orbit of Rome, which conquered Apulia following the Samnite Wars and the conflict with Taranto, thus ending the Hellenistic age in the said region. Under Roman rule Rubi enjoyed numerous privileges including legislative autonomy. However, with the passage of time this freedom was restricted with the granting of Roman citizenship and the title of municipium. Also attested is Rubi's membership in the Claudia tribe, one of the thirty-one rustic tribes. Ruvo's importance in Roman times is testified by its role as a station on the Via Traiana and by an epigraph, now located in Piazza Menotti Garibaldi, dedicated to Emperor Gordian III, which reports the existence in the city of the college of augustals. The same street, which crossed Ruvo, was traveled by the poet Quintus Horatius Flaccus, as reported in the Satires in the Iter Brundisinum. In the first century A.D. one of the oldest Christian dioceses was established in Ruvo, according to tradition: legend has it that St. Peter passed through Ruvo twice in 44 and on the first time converted some local pagans while on the second time, fleeing Rome from the persecutions of Emperor Claudius, he reconverted the same faithful who had returned to paganism, leaving as the first bishop of the city and the Apulian region St. Cletus (future third pope), to keep the faith alive in the nascent Christian community. The first Ruvestine Christians gathered in a cistern that served as a catacomb and a place of worship; a statue of the saint was also carved in stone in this place, to such an extent that the place is identified today as the cave of Saint Cletus. Under Roman rule the plan of the city was most likely to coincide with the historic center as evidenced by the remains of a domus below the Co-cathedral. In imperial times Ruvo was surrounded by walls and later suffered a first decrease in territory, as around the 5th century the cities of Molfetta, Trani and Bisceglie were established, thus preventing contact with the sea.

== Medieval Ruvo ==
Fortissima castra Rubis
The very strong castle of Ruvo

— Cantalicio, De bis recepta parthenope Gonsalviae

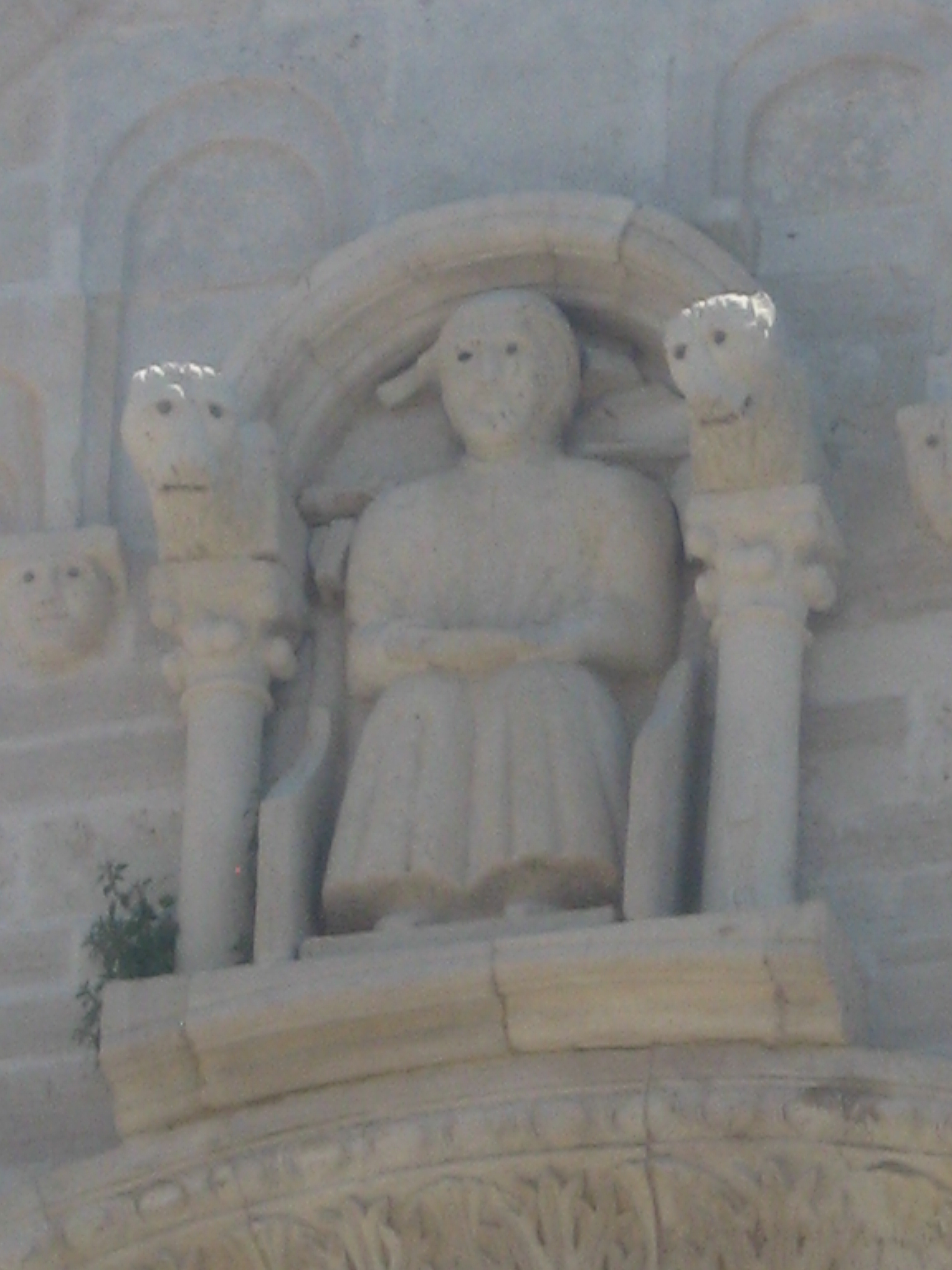
Robert II of Bassunvilla

For Ruvo, the fifth century meant the end of economic and political influence. Having fallen the Western Empire, it suffered, like the rest of the peninsula, the invasions of the Goths who razed the Roman city to the ground in 533, reducing it to a pile of rubble and thus raising the present ground about 5 or 7 meters. The survivors therefore moved down the hill building the new city above the necropolis and existing buildings only to be conquered by the Lombards in 567. In 857 Ruvo was sacked by Saracens who settled near the Purgatory Church and in the wide area still called Fondo Marasco (evolution of Fondo Moresco). To avoid finding themselves unprepared before their enemies, the Ruvestines endowed the new medieval city with very high walls, equipped with square towers and as many as four gates: Porta Noè or Noja (present-day Via Vittorio Veneto), Porta del Buccettolo (Via Campanella), Porta del Castello (Piazza Matteotti) and Porta Nuova or Sant'Angelo (Corso Piave). In the 11th century, during the Swabian-Norman era, the fortress town became part of the county of Conversano. However, the Count of Conversano, Tancredi, formed a coalition with other barons in the area rebelling against King Roger II of Sicily, who in 1129 reconquered all the revolting towns including Ruvo, the only one to put up a strenuous resistance due to its mighty walls. Legend has it that Roger II, seeing the difficulty in conquering Ruvo, had cunningly induced some local barons to betray the city thus allowing its conquest. Swabian rule, especially in the time span from 1166 to 1266, represented an economic and cultural rebirth for the local community. In this period the Romanesque cathedral, commissioned by Robert II of Bassunvilla, was built. In the same period between Ruvo and Canosa, at the behest of Frederick II of Swabia, the Castel del Monte was built. In addition, the Ruvestine countryside underwent a second reduction as Peter the Norman founded the cities of Corato and Andria. In this era the fief of Ruvo was also traversed by St. Francis of Assisi, who invited the inhabitants to build a new church (in which the Observant Friars Minor would later settle) on the site of the ruins of an old temple of Basilian monks.

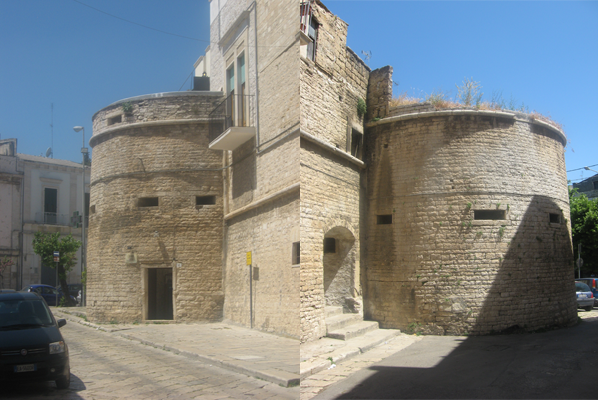
The last two remaining towers of Ruvo's medieval walls

From 1266 to 1435, the city entered the Angevin era, when on September 29, 1269, Charles I of Anjou ceded the Ruvian countryside with its hamlets (about twenty, including the important Calentano and the flourishing Matine and Strappete) to Arnolfo de Colant. Arnolfo II de Colant, Roberto de Juriaco and his son Galeriano followed as feudal lords of Ruvo. With the death of King Andrew of Hungary in 1345, Ruvo found itself in the middle of the clash between the Angevins and the Hungarians for control of the Kingdom of Naples, and in 1350 it was again sacked and razed to the ground by Ruggiero Sanseverino after a very long resistance by the Ruvestines that lasted for a good two days. It was at this time that it became necessary to build a gigantic tower, 33 meters high, called the "Tower of the Pilot" near the castle. Its base covered part of the elliptical base present today in the center of Matteotti Square and served as a prison, fort and place of defense. In addition, the tower, before the construction of the various lighthouses on the Adriatic coast, served as a landmark during the day so as to make safe the landings of sailors to their cities, while at night a bright lantern hung from the northern part of the convent of St. Angelo, being located in the highest part of the city. Following the Sanseverino attack, the inhabitants of the hamlets of Calentano and the Mattine district abandoned the countryside, taking refuge in the city and thus damaging the local agricultural economy. The existing walls were therefore repaired with a solid construction and were covered with a second stone wall; the tower was also reinforced with the addition of a rampart and a moat. At this time the Terlizzi countryside was permanently detached from Ruvo. In 1387 there was an improvement in political-social conditions as the village ceased to be a feudal town, becoming a state town. Angevin rule was succeeded by Aragonese rule, which lasted from 1435 until 1503.

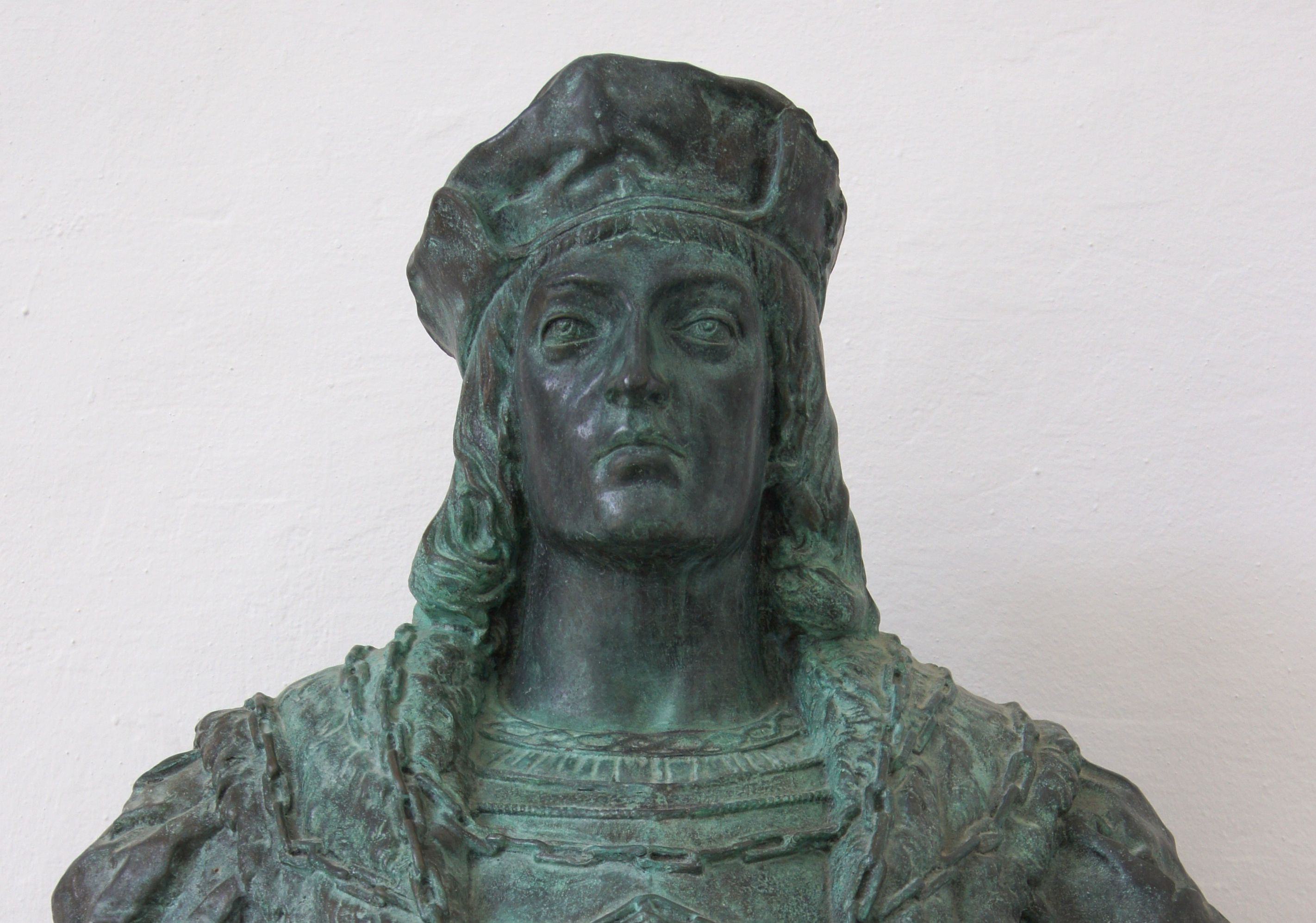
Gonzalo de Córdoba

In 1458 the city was owned by Isabella Del Balzo and then sold after three years to Galzarano de Requesens. Ruvo found itself involved in the Italian Wars of 1499-1504: during the conflict the French were stationed in the city under the leadership of Louis d'Armagnac, Duke of Nemours, whose contingent included Charles de Torgue and Jacques de La Palice. On February 13, 1503, the thirteen Frenchmen who took part in the Challenge of Barletta departed from Ruvo, after attending the congratulatory mass in the church of St. Roch. The little church of Saint Roch had been erected by the population in that same year, following the plague that struck the city. Tradition has it that Saint Roch had appeared, disguised as a traveler, in the days of the plague to the bishop of Ruvo and the first magistrate, inviting them to pray. Thus the people of Ruvo in gratitude to the saint erected a temple and he was acclaimed patron saint. On the night of February 22–23, 1503, during the absence of the Duke of Nemours, the city, entrusted to the command of Jacques de La Palice, suffered a nighttime ambush by Gonzalo de Córdoba, who sacked and destroyed the entire city center, producing such a quantity of debris and rubble that the road surface rose by a meter. The clash would go down in history under the name of the Battle of Ruvo.

== The rule of the Carafas (1510-1806) ==
Quondam magna fui totum urbs celebrata per orbem, si modo non eadem splendida fama patet
Once I was a great city celebrated throughout the world, and although I am no longer the same, my splendid fame shines through

— Inscription of 1516 found on the Porta Noé.

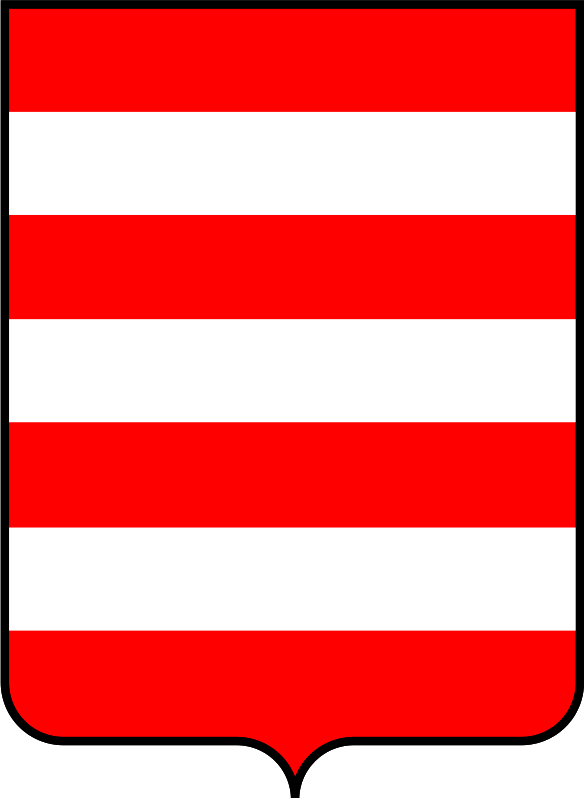
Coat of arms of the Carafa family, counts of Ruvo from 1510 to 1806

In 1510 the comital fief of Ruvo was sold by Isabella de Requesens to Cardinal Oliviero Carafa, who purchased it for his brother Fabrizio, who united the county of Ruvo with the duchy of Andria in 1522. With the arrival of the Carafa family the oldest patrician families disappeared, leaving the city to the free will of the Neapolitan lineage and emerging noble families. In 1516 under Fabrizio the walls were rebuilt and re-solidified after the assault of Gonzalo de Córdoba: the towers were also rebuilt, this time equipped with loopholes and a circular plan, as can still be seen today, and the main city gate or Porta Noé was fortified, which was also equipped with a portcullis in case the gate was broken through, surmounted by the municipal coat of arms, a niche with stone statues of the three patron saints of Ruvo, St. Cletus, St. Blaise and St. Roch, and the above-mentioned Latin inscription. However, while for almost two centuries Ruvo experienced a period of peace, the repercussions of the settlement of the new lineage weighed directly on the population and economy caught in the greedy and suffocating grip of the Carafa family, who took to appointing municipal administrators, turned the Pilota tower into a prison for opponents, hired henchmen to keep social tensions quelled, used the last remaining noble families in town to exert pressure, and allowed the locati (herd owners) from Abruzzo to carry out transhumance in the Ruvian countryside. All of this led to disastrous consequences for the city that resulted in the reduction of the population, the bankruptcy of the municipal administration (forced to sell the Contrada Difesa in 1632 due to debts) and the transfer of landed property from the hands of the peasants to those of the clergy. In addition, all municipal documents were transported from Ruvo to Andria. At the same time several noble palaces belonging to the Griffi, Avitaia, Caputi and Rocca families were built in Ruvo (later the palace would be bought by the Spada family), reflecting their influence and good economic condition. Religious buildings were also built such as the convent of St. Dominic and the Capuchin monastery in addition to some palatial houses including that of the Rubini family.

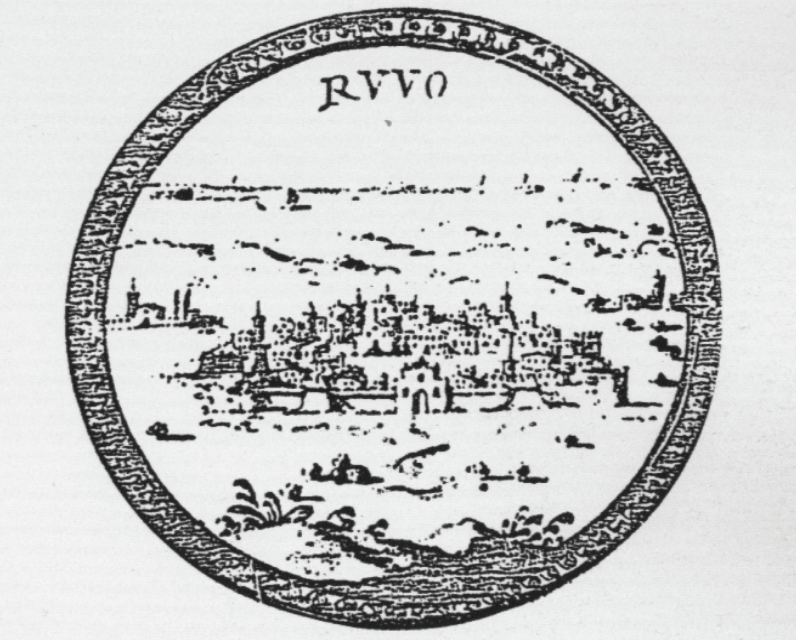
Ruvo as seen from Porta Noé in 1708, illustration by Cassiano de Silva

The wealth of Ruvo's fiefdom reached only the aristocratic strata, and these were joined by the clergy led by the bishop, who consolidated their role with the establishment of two new churches (the Purgatory and Carmine churches) and with the founding of the various confraternities in the age of the Counter-Reformation, including the Carmine archconfraternity, formed almost exclusively by clergymen, which became the richest and most influential brotherhood in the town. Together with the other confraternities (Confraternity of St. Rocco, Confraternity of the Purgatory and Confraternity of Purification-Addolorata) it carried out charitable-assistance activities: the same ones currently take care of the rites of Holy Week in Ruvo di Puglia. The major patronal feast of the Octave was established in the 16th century: according to tradition, the count of Ruvo, Ettore I Carafa, on his return from a hunting party from the Contrada Parco del conte, entered the city as the Corpus Christi procession was unfolding, and crossed the procession breaking it into two blocks; the population railed against the count, but at the moment of the passage of the most holy sacrament his horse bowed as a sign of respect, causing Carafa to fall, who, astonished and embittered by the incident, decided to have the feast repeated eight days later, thus instituting the Octave procession. Throughout the 1600s the population of Ruvo declined dramatically from 5816 inhabitants to 700, as it was torn apart by natural disasters such as the locust invasion of 1606, the snowfall with frost of 1616 (the consequences of which weighed on the Ruvian economy for the next ten years), the drought of 1622, the earthquakes of 1626 and 1627, and the plague of 1656. Important figures in Ruvo's history lived in this era, such as Antonio Avitaja (1621–1678), a man of letters, playwright, mayor in 1646 and founder of the Accademia degli Incogniti, Orazio Rocca (1674–1742), a magistrate and benefactor persecuted by the Carafa family, and above all Domenico Cotugno, a physician, anatomist and surgeon, discoverer of the causes of sciatica and the functioning of the inner ear ducts. Between 1795 and 1799 Ettore IV Carafa became count of Ruvo: having Jacobin ideals, he took an active part in the vicissitudes of the Neapolitan republic of 1799 and died on the guillotine in Naples with the other revolutionaries. In 1806 with the descent of Napoleon's troops into southern Italy, feudalism was abolished and thus ended the Carafa rule that had lasted three centuries.

== Liberal uprisings and the Risorgimento ==
There is no sovereign who does not know that Ruvo was equal to the most beautiful relics; there is no archaeologist who does not consider the vases and other ancient objects of Ruvo as the most interesting and the best in the world.

— Salvatore Fenicia, Memoria archeologica sopra li dodeci primi vasi scelti della collezione delle anticaglie de' Signori Jatta

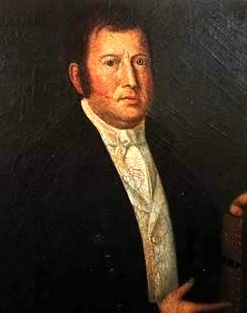
Giovanni Jatta

When the Neapolitan Republic was established in 1799, backed by the French army of General Jean Étienne Championnet, riots and insurrections of Jacobin inspiration broke out in Ruvo, which was still under the control of the Carafa family: the tricolor was hoisted on the clock tower (built in the 17th century) and the tree of liberty was planted in the main square. Soon the false news spread that the British navy would bombard all the towns on the coast that had planted the tree; the population seized with fear rushed to demolish the cypress and attacked the Jacobins and the municipal administrators who had done their best to plant the symbol of the revolution, without thinking that the cannonades from the sea of the British could never have reached the walls of Ruvo. The city thus fell into anarchy following the anti-Republican uprisings of the Sanfedists. Rushing to Ruvo's aid were Count Ettore IV Carafa and Magistrate Giovanni Jatta, two men of completely different ideals, one noble and the other liberal and averse to the count's lineage. Carafa, having seen his hometown Andria burn in the conflict between Sanfedists and the French, despite having supported republican ideals by favoring the action of General Broussier, sought to avoid a similar fate for Ruvo. Once the revolution failed, the count was executed in Naples and the Bourbons returned to power. Jatta, who had been elected several times by the people of Ruvo as the city's lawyer, as early as 1794 contested the defense of Ruvo in disputes with the Abruzzese herd owners and then also lashed out against the Carafa family aiming at the disintegration of the fiefdom: this case he undertook revealed his liberal tendencies and he was thus forced into exile in Switzerland by the Bourbon authorities and then returned to Naples during the revolution following General Championnet in 1799. During the period of the Republic he organized the National Guard in Ruvo and restored order in the city but this cost him the inclusion of his name among the state offenders and as many as ten years of exile when the Bourbons returned to the Kingdom of Naples. Having resumed his legal activities, in 1803 Jatta made agreements with the Carafa family, regarding the fate of the fiefdom, and with the Law of the Tavoliere he resolved the issues with the Abruzzese herd owners. The agreements made by Jatta, as defender of the city, were so fruitful that the municipality of Ruvo managed to pay off numerous debts and was counted among the richest in the province. In the same years the Dominicans were removed from Ruvo, while their church of San Domenico was entrusted to the Confraternity of the Purification. Jatta also witnessed the first excavations of Pompeii and Herculaneum, and infected by enthusiasm he initiated excavations in the Ruvestine countryside as well, discovering an underground historical and artistic heritage. Jatta became a collector and surrounded himself with the best experts, thus collecting the most relevant archaeological finds and setting up his private collection.

In addition to the Jatta family, the Fenicia and Caputi families also created collections of clay vases and coins. Upon Giovanni Jatta's death the collection was united with that of his brother Giulio and a museum was then established. Many were the antiquities and artifacts unearthed from the subsoil, and many of them were sold and donated to private and public museums in Naples. The discovery of the many finds from the Greek era made Ruvo famous and gave it a place in ancient history. In the Napoleonic era, the Ruvo cemetery was built by architect Tommaso Ferrieri Caputi, outside the city walls as stipulated by the edict of Saint Cloud.

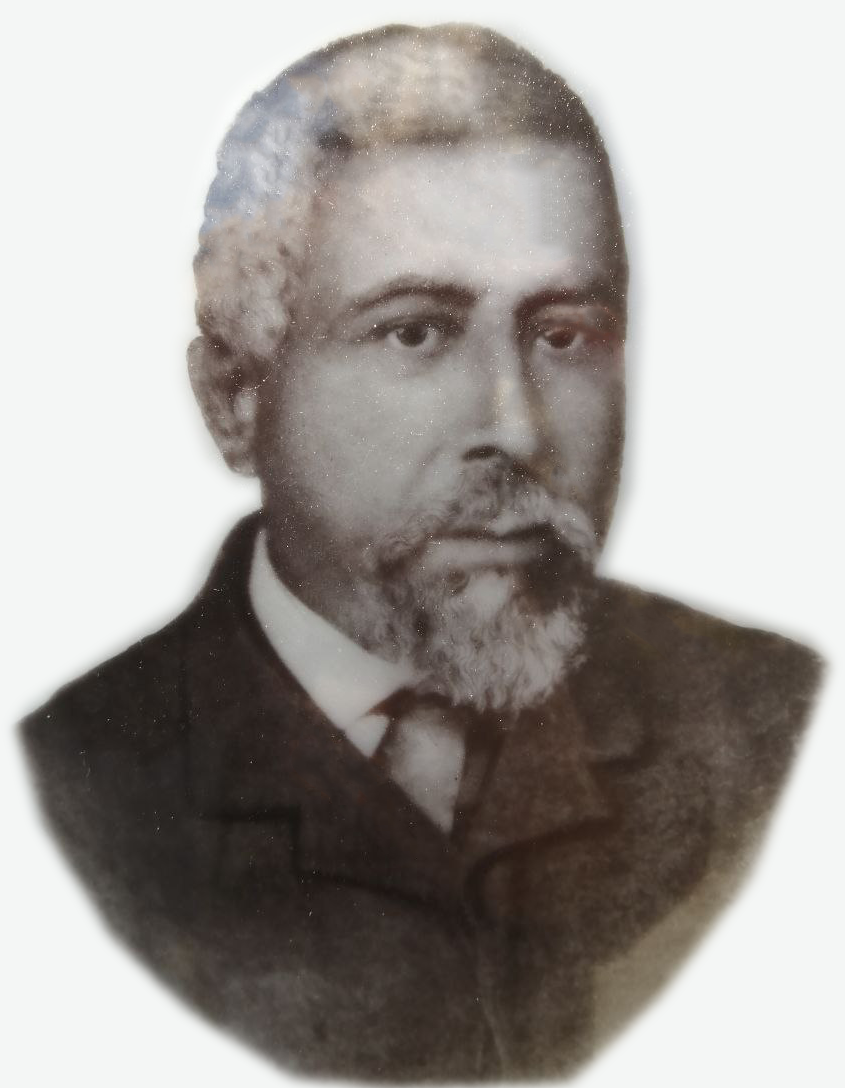
Francesco Rubini

After the fall of the Napoleonic Empire, Bourbon rule was restored over the South with the establishment of the Kingdom of the Two Sicilies. As early as 1817, a Carbonari cell called "Perfetta Fedeltà" was established in Ruvo with 162 members, including the aforementioned Tommaso Ferrieri Caputi, Vincenzo Cervone and Francesco Rubini, which promoted liberal and constitutional struggles. Despite the dissolution of the secret societies in 1821 by Ferdinand I, Ruvestine patriots continued their activities clandestinely in the homes of liberals Marino and Pasquale Cervone or in the church of the Madonna dell'Isola, which no longer exists. The leading figure of the 1848 uprisings was undoubtedly Francesco Rubini, who also joined Young Italy, was praised several times by Giuseppe Mazzini and Giuseppe Garibaldi, and acquired a reputation as a tireless preacher, capable of inflaming the spirits of the population, so much so that for his activities in 1849 he was arrested and tried. Released from prison after two years and forced into police supervision, he was considered highly dangerous even during the brief reign of Francis II. On Sept. 6, 1860, he was appointed by Garibaldi as governor with full powers, freed the patriots captured by General Pallavicino and formed the triumvirate of the "New Italy" with Giovanni Jatta Jr. and Vincenzo Chieco; he then became commander of the six companies captained by the same number of Ruvestines and then appointed by Bettino Ricasoli as first major of the National Guard, a post he held until 1886. In addition, Rubini and Cervone hosted Menotti Garibaldi in Ruvo, in the villa from that day called "Caprera," to recruit volunteers for the Trento campaign. He refused the office of prefect and Knight of the Kingdom of Italy, so much so that he was called the "renouncing lawyer" by Giovanni Bovio and Matteo Renato Imbriani. In 1861 he sided with the historical left but remained convinced that the Italian people were yet to be forged and was very bitter about the economic, political and social trends after the unification of Italy.

== From 1861 to industrial progress ==
[...] Optima cuncta mihi, cives, caelumque, solumque,
lac, fructus, segetes, mel fragrans, grataque vina.
Aegrotos sano, validorum corpora firmo.
Siste Rubis gressum si vis bene ducere vitam.
[...] All my things are great: the citizens, the climate, the terrain,
milk, fruit, fodder, fragrant honey and wines.
I heal the sick and make healthy bodies stronger.
Stay in Ruvo if you want to lead a good life.

— Giovanni Jatta, inscription on the old municipal house.

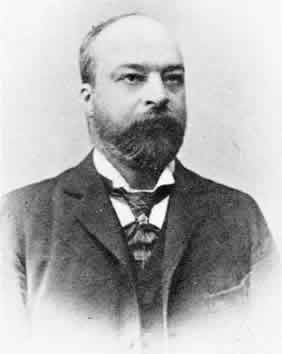
Il deputato Antonio Jatta

In the post-unification period Ruvo experienced a moment of growth and productivity, and in the same years Ruvo's deputy for the Kingdom of Italy Antonio Jatta addressed labor conditions in Apulia. Progress was marked by the construction of communication routes such as the railroad and the many roads that connected the city with the rest of Apulia. The various districts were revalued and turned into flourishing vineyards, olive groves and almond orchards, and estates were distributed. The population grew quickly and the town's urban planning changed radically: in the early 19th century, the walls and gates were torn down, leaving only two towers standing since the ancient wall did not allow the proper flow of air and thus contributed to a precarious hygienic condition. In 1820 the first public school in Ruvo was entrusted to the Scolopian Fathers and in the same period work was started on the Corato-Ruvo-Terlizzi road. During 1857 Ruvo was ravaged by an epidemic that affected the throats of many children; once again the population resorted to faith by exposing the relics of St. Blaise, protector of the throat. After a short time the epidemic disappeared and the Armenian saint was named co-patron of the city. Until 1861 the Pilot Tower remained intact, which was purchased by the municipality, renovated, cleared of the rampart surrounding it and turned into a telegraph office. However, the removal of the rampart made the structure unstable, and at 10 p.m. on February 18, 1881, it collapsed without causing casualties. In the same year the Ferrotramviaria came into operation, thus enabling communication with neighboring towns, while a year earlier Ruvo was equipped with the steam tramway that connected it with Bari and Barletta. In spite of the innovations of progress, Ruvo, as well as the whole of southern Italy, experienced the social tensions that resulted in the first laborer uprisings driven by hunger: the laborer insurrections were suppressed in blood on January 8, 1894, while the clashes of January 7, 1904 ended with the toll of one dead and several wounded. On May 14, 1905, Ruvo was provided with electric light, which, however, remained for a long time a privilege of the elite few, while an element benefiting the entire population was the construction of the Apulian Aqueduct in 1914. On January 8, 1908, the political struggle between the two local parties resulted in an armed clash in which three citizens lost their lives.

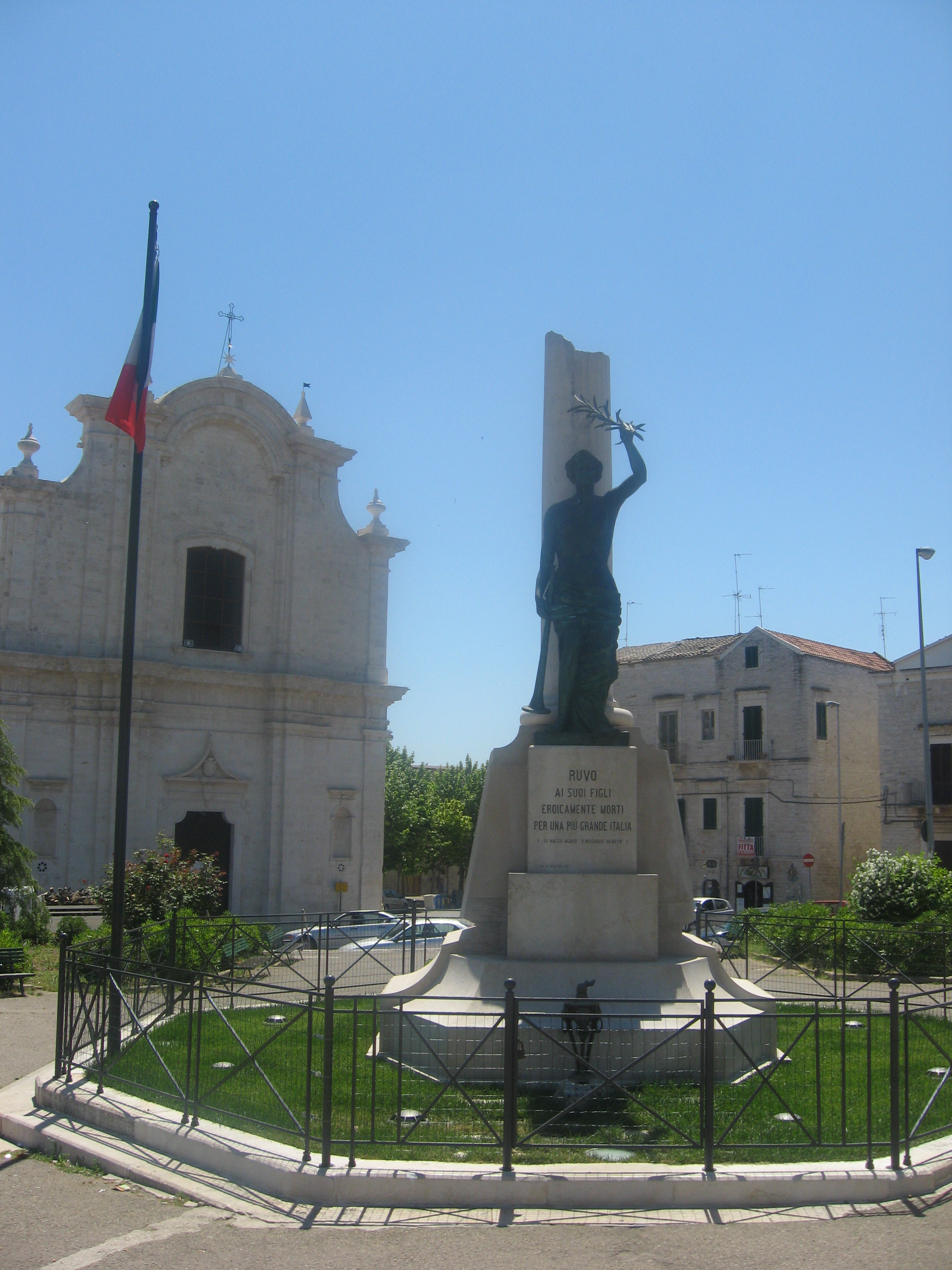
War Memorial in Bovio Square

During World War I many Ruvestine soldiers were killed on the battlefields: at the end of the war a monument was erected in Bovio Square to the 367 Ruvestines who fell in the war conflict. The end of the war was followed by the frightening epidemic of Spanish flu, which also struck Ruvo causing a very high number of deaths, so much so that it was necessary to destroy the cinema Roma, made of wood, in order to build new coffins. During the 20-year fascist period, the area of the quagmire, which carried malaria, was reclaimed, the sewerage system was created in 1933, and the Vittoria cinema opened in 1938. However, there were many protests against Mussolini's regime by workers and peasants who stormed the Casa del Fascio present in Matteotti Square. An example of antifascism was the priest Domenico Paparella, called the "Ruvian Don Sturzo": he organized the local section of the People's Party by refusing the membership of the National Fascist Party, whose refusal was followed by beatings by the squadrists. Paparella organized the youth and urged them to exercise any democratic activity that might annoy the fascists. He was imprisoned on a sham charge of firing on the crowd but the authorities were forced to release him given the pressure of the Ruvestine people who rose up against the squadrists who had hatched the plot. Another anti-fascist was engineer Egidio Boccuzzi, who was also lynched for refusing a PNF membership card because he was a socialist. Boccuzzi was falsely accused of design errors and therefore suspended, but engineer Sylos-Labini, called in to verify his incompetence, found nothing wrong rehabilitating him as a professional but not as an official at the behest of the regime. Boccuzzi designed the "Giovanni Bovio" elementary school building, the Sacred Heart Institute, the Church of the Redeemer as well as the avenue and some cemetery chapels. Ruvo was liberated immediately after the Cassibile armistice and therefore saw the U.S. Army enter the city on the morning of September 16, 1943. However, in the immediate aftermath of the war, in 1946, a year of tensions and uprisings, a bloody event was also recorded in Ruvo: on March 14, some militants of the local section of the PCI, during the contestation of the opening of the headquarters of the Common Man's Front, were victims of the explosion of a hand grenade, thrown by the qualunquist Giulio La Fortezza, which caused two deaths and twenty-nine injuries. The labor uprisings and struggles did not stop throughout the immediate postwar period to culminate in 1969 with a week of protest that began on July 5, the day of the resignation of the First Rumor government, evolved into strikes, occupations and clashes by the laborers and ended on July 11 with the signing of the new labor agreements. During the period of economic revival, the town distinguished itself on the cultural scene with the brothers Antonio and Alessandro Amenduni, both composers, who became famous for the funeral marches accompanying the Holy Week processions in Ruvo di Puglia, and Domenico Cantatore, a painter, who became internationally famous for his odalisques and landscapes that recall Apulia and especially Ruvo. In terms of production and industry, the municipality was provided with the industrial zone at the rise of the 1970s and has become particularly well known nationally and internationally for its extra virgin olive oil and Castel del Monte DOC wine.

== See also ==
- Battle of Ruvo
- Province of Bari
- Kingdom of Naples
- Kingdom of the Two Sicilies

== Bibliography ==
- Quintus Horatius Flaccus. Satires (in Latin). Roma.
- Anonimo Autore di Veduta (1633). Historia del combattimento de' tredici italiani con altrettanti francesi. Napoli.
- Autori Vari (1769). Raccolta di tutti i più rinomati scrittori dell'istoria generale del Regno di Napoli. Napoli: Gravier.
- Jatta, Giovanni (1844). Cenno storico sull'antichissima città di Ruvo nella Peucezia del giureconsulto napolitano Giovanni Jatta, colla giunta della breve istoria del famoso combattimento de' tredici Cavalieri Italiani con altrettanti Francesi seguito nelle vicinanze della detta città nel dì 13 Febbrajo 1503. Napoli: Porcelli.
- Vincenzio D'Avino (1848). Cenni storici sulle chiese arcivescovili, vescovili, e prelatizie (nullius) del regno delle Due Sicilie. Napoli: Ranucci.
- Gaetano Moroni (1852). Dizionario di erudizione storico-ecclesiastica da San Pietro ai nostri giorni, specialmente intorno ai principali santi, beati, martiri, padri, ai sommi pontefici, cardinali e più celebri scrittori ecclesiastici, ai varii gradi della gerarchia della chiesa cattolica, alle città patriarcali, arcivescovili e vescovili, agli scismi, alle eresie, ai concilii, alle feste più solenni, ai riti, alle cerimonie sacre, alle cappelle papali, cardinalizie e prelatizie, agli ordini religiosi, militari, equestri ed ospitalieri, non che alla corte e curia romana ed alla famiglia pontificia, ec. ec. ec., compilato da Gaetano Moroni Romano primo aiutante di camera di Sua Santità. Venezia: Tipografia Emiliana.
- Salvatore Fenicia (1854). Memoria archeologica sopra li dodeci primi vasi scelti della collezione delle anticaglie de' Signori Jatta. Napoli: Salvatore Piscopo.
- Salvatore Fenicia (1857). Monografia di Ruvo di Magna Grecia. Napoli: Salvatore Piscopo.
- Filippo Jatta (1930). Sintesi storica della città di Ruvo. Ruvo di Puglia: Speranza & de Rosellis.
- Angelo Tedone (1992). Rhyps, Rubi, Ruvo (città e agro). Ruvo di Puglia: Azienda Grafica Fiorino.
- Di Palo, Francesco (1993). Museo Archeologico Jatta. Ruvo di Puglia: Azienda Grafica Fiorino.
- Di Palo, Francesco (1994). Passione e Morte. Fasano: Schena.
- Angelo Tedone (1997). Ruvo di Puglia, Uomini illustri. Giovinazzo: Litografia Serigrafia Levante.
- Marina Silvestrini (2005). Le città della Puglia romana - un profilo sociale. Bari: Edipuglia.
- Andrea Celestino Montanaro (2007). Ruvo di Puglia e il suo territorio - Le necropoli, i corredi funerari tra la documentazione del XIX secolo e gli scavi moderni. Roma: L'Erma di Bretschneider.
- Comune di Ruvo di Puglia (2010). U calèndaríe de la 'ggíende de Ríuve. Terlizzi: Centro Stampa.
