= Bitonto Cathedral =

Roman Catholic cathedral in Bitonto, Italy

Coordinates: 41°06′23″N 16°41′24″E

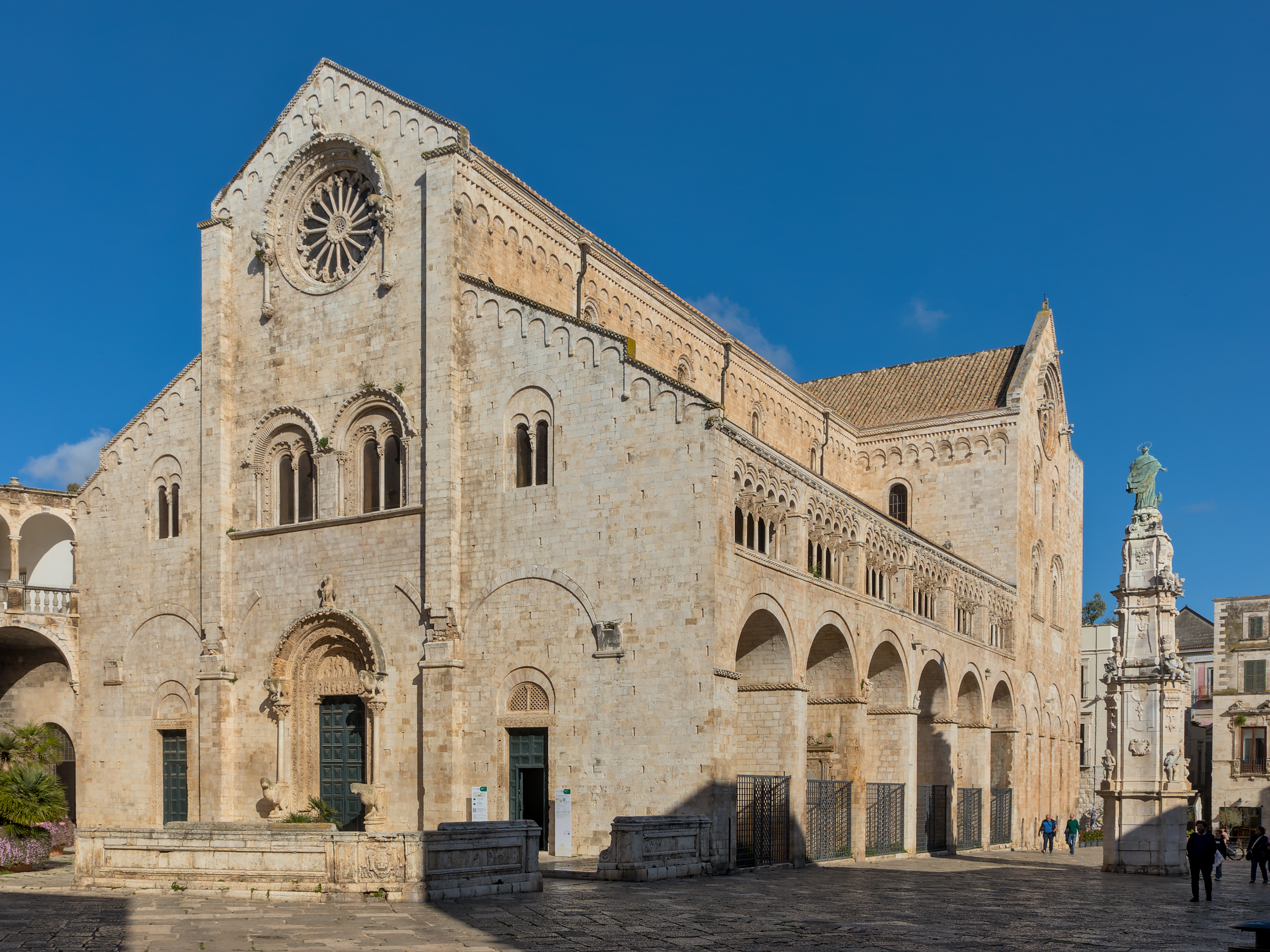
Bitonto Cathedral

Bitonto Cathedral (Italian: Duomo di Bitonto, Concattedrale di Maria SS. Assunta) is a Roman Catholic cathedral in the city of Bitonto in the Province of Bari, Italy.

== History ==
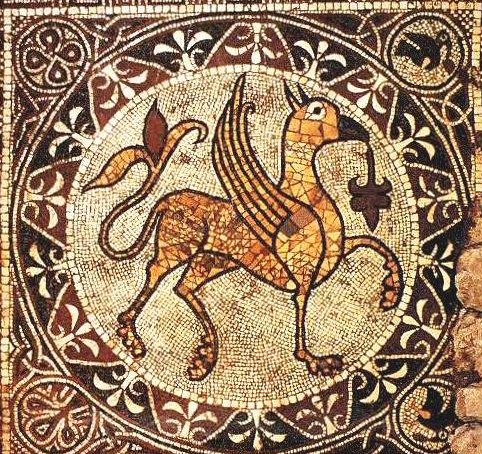
Griffin tile from previous church, in the present crypt

The cathedral, dedicated to Saint Mary, was the seat of the small Bishopric of Bitonto from the bishopric's foundation, believed to be in the 8th century, until 1818, when it was combined with the neighbouring Diocese of Ruvo to form the Diocese of Ruvo e Bitonto. This was separated again in 1982, and the Diocese of Bitonto, with Bitonto Cathedral as its seat, was briefly revived, but was combined with the Archdiocese of Bari in 1986 to form the Archdiocese of Bari-Bitonto, in which Bitonto Cathedral is now a co-cathedral.

== Structure ==
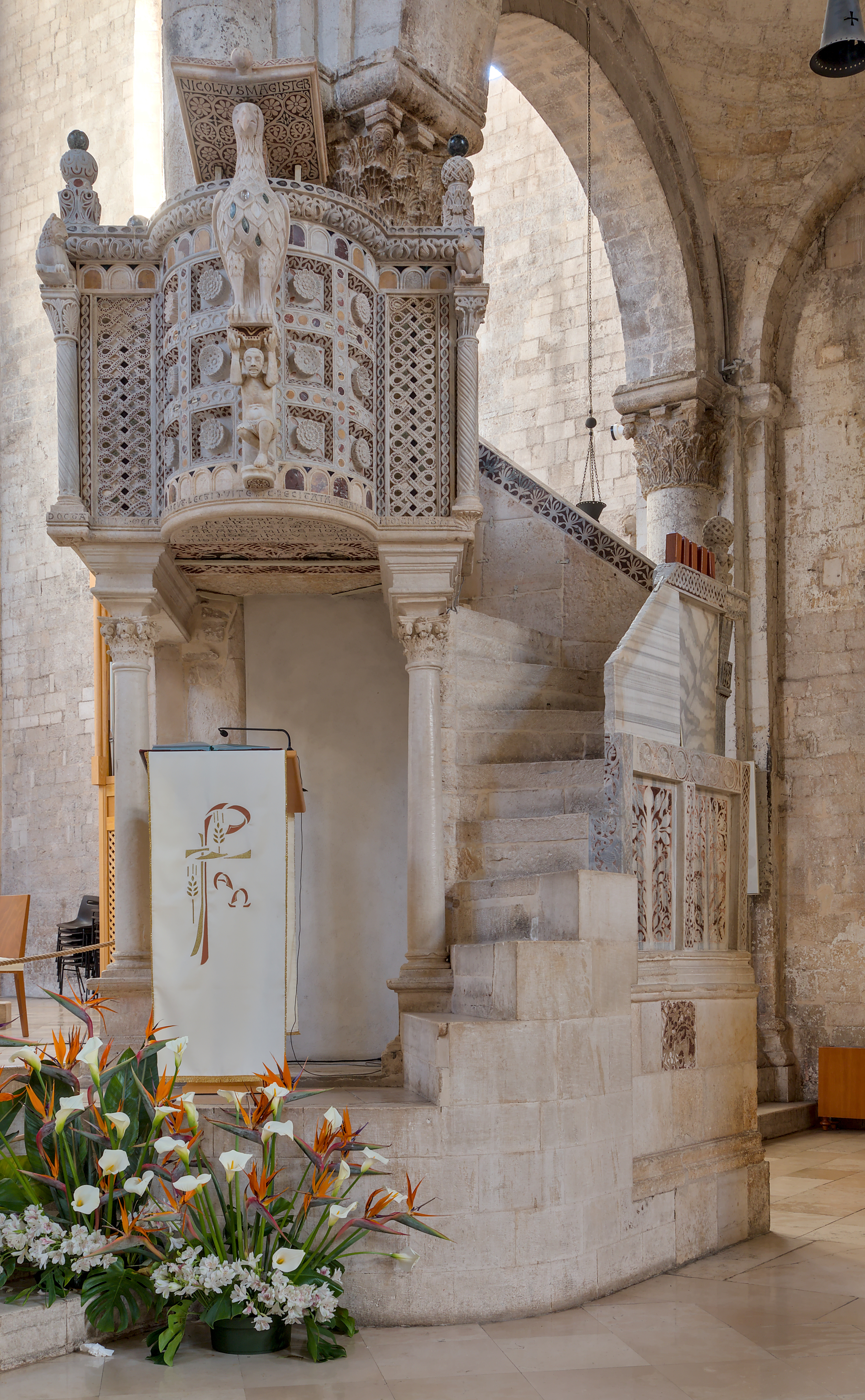
Ambo

The remains of a palaeochristian church, which predates by some centuries the establishment of the bishopric, have been discovered underneath the present building.

The existing church however is a Romanesque building of the late 11th-12th centuries, influenced by the Basilica of San Nicola in Bari. The west front is divided into three parts and has three portals (the central one of which is sculpted with plant motifs and scenes from the Old Testament), four mullioned windows and a rose window flanked by sculptures of animals supported by small columns. The interior has a nave and two aisles, and is also notable for its sculpture. The main artwork is the marble ambo, a combined pulpit and lectern, of 1229, a masterpiece of medieval Apulian stonecarving. In the crypt is a tile of a griffin, a survival from the predecessor church building.

== See also ==
- Ruvo Cathedral
- Norman architecture

== Sources and external links ==
- Catholic Hierarchy: Bitonto
- Catholic Encyclopedia: Diocese of Ruvo
- Mondimedievali.net: history and pictures of Bitonto Cathedral (in Italian)
- Photographs of the cathedral
- History (in Italian)
