= Margherita d'Andria =

Margherita Pignatelli Aragona Cortés, duchess d'Andria (1740–1810) was an Italian courtier.

== Life ==
She was born to Prince Fabrizio di Noia and Costanza de' Medici, and married Duke Riccardo Carafa d'Andria in 1767. She served as principal lady-in-waiting (Mistress of the Robes) to Queen Maria Carolina of Austria. She was the mother of Ettore Carafa, who had Republican sympathies. His political views were a cause of conflict between them, as the queen had her reprimand him for his views. When the Parthenopean Republic was declared in 1799, however, she became one of its profiled supporters, and became known for her efforts to help the wounded. At the fall of the republic, she was arrested by a Royalist mob and reportedly undressed in a mock attempt by the mob to portray her as the goddess of liberty. She managed to avoid a death sentence for her support of the Republic.
