= Ettore Carafa =

Italian soldier and politician (1767–1799)

Ettore Carafa Count of Ruvo, Duke of Andria
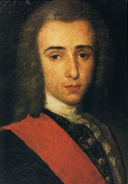
- Born: December 29, 1767; Andria, Kingdom of Naples
- Died: September 4, 1799 (aged 31); Naples, Parthenopean Republic
- Cause of death: Execution by decapitation
- Military career
- Allegiance: (France) French First Republic (Naples) Parthenopean Republic
- Rank: Commandant / General
- Commands: Legione Napoletana
- Conflicts: Siege of San Severo (1799); Siege of Andria (1799); Siege of Pescara(1799)

Ettore Carafa d'Andria, the Count of Ruvo (10 August 1767, in Andria – 4 September 1799, in Naples) was an Italian soldier and republican patriot, executed after the fall of the Parthenopean Republic. His courage, idealism, and resolute optimism created in Ettore an image of the Italian martyr for following generations involved in the struggle for more democratic structures and an Italian nation.

== Biography ==
His father, Riccardo Carafa, was the Duke of Andria; his mother, Margherita Pignatelli, was the sister of the Vicar General, Francesco Pignatelli. Ettore had three brothers: Francesco, Fabrizio, and Carlo. He had three sisters: Maria Giuseppa married to the Duke of Sangro, lieutenant general to the King; Maria Luisa married to Baldassarre Caracciolo, Duke of Casteldisangro; and another married to the Duke of Altemps. The house of Carafa had long been a prestigious noble family, which included an ancestor as Pope Paul IV. The Duke and Duchess had offices in the Court and were very loyal and faithful to the Bourbons; the Duchess and the daughters were considered pious, religious, and of strict morals.

Ettore and his brothers, unlike his parents, were attracted by the revolutionary fervor emanating from France. In 1787–1788, Ettore had secretly traveled to Paris with his tutor Franco Laghezza of Trani, where he became enamored with Jacobin ideas.

After returning to Naples, there was an incident wherein Ettore had appeared wearing a color emblematic of the revolution, in the form of a scarlet waistcoat, at the Fiorentini theater; this prompted a complaint by the Queen made to his mother, the Duchess of Andria. He was already under suspicion for being a leader of a movement that translated into Italian the 1789 Declaration of the Rights of Man and of the Citizen, and distributed the copies throughout Naples.

On 23 June 1794, Ettore's father, the Duke, died. As the eldest son, he would to inherit his father's appointment to the Order of San Gennaro. However, due to his anti-monarchical idealism, he refused to receive the honors of his father from the royal court. After an angry debate with his mother, he entered to the church of San Severino e Sossio, where he proceeded to blacken the escutcheon on the tomb of his venerable ancestor Carafa, who had been grand prior of the order of Malta.

By August, he was arrested while making a trip outside the city. With the help of his brother Carlo Carafa, the castle commander Guglielmo Pepe, and large bribes, he was soon able to escape from Castel Sant'Elmo, and flee to the Cisalpine Republic that had been established in Milan.

In January 1799, he joined the French-Italian army of General Championnet that invaded Naples, and forced the frightened King to flee to Sicily, and leave Ettore's uncle as Vicar General in the city. In Naples, the Parthenopean Republic was founded, and soon the young Ettore received the command of a Republican Legion.

One anecdote about Ettore's brother, Carlo, is that he was ordered by the Neapolitan Directory to proceed to Rome to levy soldiers to fight under Ettore in Abruzzo. Carlo approached his mother, the Duchess, to ask for funds for the trip and effort. The Duchess was living with her daughters in the Palazzo Vargas-Macciucca in Portici, since their palace in Naples had been burned and looted by the mob in January 1799. The Duchess supposedly angrily replied that she would give no money for such a purpose, but then dropped the keys to the money-chest, allowing Carlo to take the money she would not give.

Another brother, Francesco also fought with the Republican forces. On 13 June 1799, during the battle at the Ponte della Maddalena in Naples, he fell into a ditch, was seized and recognized by a Sanfedista from Andria, brought before Cardinal Ruffo, who jailed him at Castel Nuovo, from which he emerged after the Peace of Florence.

Ettore traveled to Puglia with General Duhesme. There they besieged San Severo, which after a violent assault, quickly fell. Then Ettore moved south to Andria with General Broussier and alongside his former jailer Guglielmo Pepe, where he thought his birthplace and the feud of his family ties would welcome him. However, the feudal lord who circled the walls of the city, trying to convince those inside that the republic aimed to abolish feudal status, was fired upon by his fellow Andrians atop the walls. A siege followed, featuring French artillery forced the city to surrender, and much of Andria was burned and sacked. For his next mission, Ettore was sent north to defend Pescara, but under nebulous circumstances, he was arrested by the pro-monarchical forces.

Ettore was moved to Naples, which had fallen to the Sanfedisti forces of Cardinal Ruffo. His last days were sordid, but he apparently still demonstrated valor to the end. He was taken to Naples and kept under guard with an iron cage around his neck for several days, which prevented sleep; ragged and with a long beard, he was brought to the Public Marketplace to be beheaded.

On 24 September 1799, his remains were buried in the Church of Santa Caterina near the Carmine Maggiore.

== Legacy ==
Ettore's life was short; the battles won by his legions, meager; and at the time of his death, the republic was overthrown, and Naples was in the thrall of a brutal reactionary purge. However, the King and Queen would again flee when the Napoleonic armies swept again into Campania, this time maintaining rule through French authorities, including King Joachim Murat from 1808 till 1815, when the Bourbon monarchy was restored. Ultimately, while the accomplishments of Ettore were limited, the echo of his passion reverberated among Romantic revolutionary movements in Southern Italy.

He rebelled against his upbringing: an aristocrat who fought for the rights of all men; a literate young man versed in cavalry battles. Ultimately, Ettore joined the legions of the tragic young patriots seeking liberty, who were executed by the Neapolitan "Ancien Régime".

Renowned for his fervor and the purity of his ideals, the romantic figure of Ettore Carafa—a high-ranking aristocrat who aligned himself with the aspirations of the common people—inspired several 19th-century novelists. Alexandre Dumas featured him as a character in the novel La Sanfelice, which he wrote in Naples in 1864. Ippolito Nievo devoted several chapters to Ettore Carafa in his major work, The Confessions of an Italian, a landmark of 19th-century Italian literature.

== Other sources ==
- Benedetto Croce. La Rivoluzione Napoletana del 1799. 3rd edition (in Italian). Gius. Laterza and Sons, Bari, 1912. OL 14018031M.
- Vincenzo Cuoco (1861). Saggio Storico sulla Rivoluzione di Napoli (1799) (in Italian).
- istituto Tecnico Economico Statale, Liceo Economico Sociale Ettore Carafa short biography.
