= List of railway stations in Apulia =

This is the list of the railway stations in Apulia owned by:

- Rete Ferroviaria Italiana (RFI), a branch of the Italian state company Ferrovie dello Stato;
- Ferrovie del Sud Est (FSE), a branch of the Italian state company Ferrovie dello Stato;
- Ferrovie Appulo Lucane (FAL);
- Ferrovie del Gargano (FG);
- Ferrotramviaria (FNB).

== RFI stations ==
Station	Locality	Province	Category
Acquaviva delle Fonti	Acquaviva	Bari	Silver
Altamura	Altamura	Bari	Bronze
Apricena	Apricena	Foggia	Bronze
Ascoli Satriano	Ascoli Satriano	Foggia	Bronze
Bari Centrale	Bari	Bari	Platinum
Bari Enziteto Catino	Bari	Bari	Bronze
Bari Marconi	Bari	Bari	Silver
Bari Palese Macchie	Bari	Bari	Silver
Bari Parco Sud	Bari	Bari	Bronze
Bari Santo Spirito	Bari	Bari	Silver
Bari Torre a Mare	Bari	Bari	Bronze
Bari Zona Industriale	Bari	Bari	Bronze
Barletta	Barletta	Barletta-Andria-Trani	Gold
Bisceglie	Bisceglie	Barletta-Andria-Trani	Silver
Bitetto-Palo del Colle	Bitetto	Bari	Silver
Bovino-Deliceto	Bovino	Foggia	Bronze
Brindisi	Brindisi	Brindisi	Gold
Candela-Sant'Agata di Puglia	Candela	Foggia	Bronze
Canne della Battaglia	Canne	Barletta-Andria-Trani	Bronze
Canosa di Puglia	Canosa di Puglia	Barletta-Andria-Trani	Silver
Carovigno	Carovigno	Brindisi	Bronze
Castellaneta	Castellaneta	Taranto	Bronze
Castellaneta Marina	Castellaneta	Taranto	Bronze
Cerignola Campagna	Cerignola	Foggia	Silver
Cervaro	Borgo Cervaro	Foggia	Bronze
Chieuti-Serracapriola	Chieuti	Foggia	Bronze
Cisternino	Cisternino	Brindisi	Bronze
Fasano	Fasano	Brindisi	Silver
Foggia	Foggia	Foggia	Gold
Francavilla Fontana	Francavilla Fontana	Brindisi	Silver
Ginosa	Ginosa	Taranto	Bronze
Gioia del Colle	Gioia del Colle	Taranto	Silver
Giovinazzo	Giovinazzo	Bari	Silver
Gravina in Puglia	Gravina in Puglia	Bari	Bronze
Grottaglie	Grottaglie	Taranto	Bronze
Grumo Appula	Binetto	Bari	Silver
Incoronata	Incoronata	Foggia	Bronze
Latiano	Latiano	Brindisi	Silver
Lecce	Lecce	Lecce	Gold
Manfredonia	Manfredonia	Foggia	Bronze
Massafra	Massafra	Taranto	Bronze
Mesagne	Mesagne	Brindisi	Bronze
Minervino Murge	Minervino Murge	Barletta-Andria-Trani	Bronze
Modugno Città	Modugno	Bari	Bronze
Mola di Bari	Mola di Bari	Bari	Silver
Molfetta	Molfetta	Bari	Silver
Monopoli	Monopoli	Bari	Silver
Ordona	Ordona	Foggia	Bronze
Oria	Oria	Brindisi	Bronze
Orsara di Puglia	Orsara di Puglia	Foggia	Bronze
Ortanova	Orta Nova	Foggia	Bronze
Ostuni	Ostuni	Brindisi	Silver
Palagianello	Palagianello	Taranto	Bronze
Palagiano-Chiatona	Palagiano	Taranto	Bronze
Palagiano-Mottola	Palagiano	Taranto	Bronze
Poggio Imperiale	Poggio Imperiale	Foggia	Bronze
Poggiorsini	Poggiorsini	Bari	Bronze
Polignano a Mare	Polignano a Mare	Bari	Silver
Rignano Garganico	Rignano Garganico	Foggia	Bronze
Rocchetta Sant'Antonio-Lacedonia	Rocchetta Sant'Antonio	Foggia	Bronze
San Pietro Vernotico	San Pietro Vernotico	Brindisi	Silver
San Severo	San Severo	Foggia	Silver
San Vito dei Normanni	San Vito dei Normanni	Brindisi	Bronze
Santeramo	Santeramo in Colle	Bari	Bronze
Siponto	Siponto	Foggia	Bronze
Spinazzola	Spinazzola	Barletta-Andria-Trani	Silver
Squinzano	Squinzano	Lecce	Silver
Taranto	Taranto	Taranto	Gold
Trani	Trani	Barletta-Andria-Trani	Silver
Trepuzzi	Trepuzzi	Lecce	Silver
Trinitapoli-San Ferdinando di Puglia	Trinitapoli	Barletta-Andria-Trani	Silver

== FSE stations ==
Station	Locality	Province
Adelfia	Adelfia	Bari
Alberobello	Alberobello	Bari
Alessano-Corsano	Alessano	Lecce
Alezio	Alezio	Lecce
Andrano-Castiglione	Andrano	Lecce
Bagnolo del Salento	Bagnolo del Salento	Lecce
Bax Capece	Francavilla Fontana	Brindisi
Bari Ceglie-Carbonara	Bari	Bari
Bari La Fitta	Bari	Bari
Bari Sud Est	Bari	Bari
Campi Salentina	Campi Salentina	Lecce
Cannole	Cannole	Lecce
Capurso	Capurso	Bari
Carmiano-Magliano	Carmiano	Lecce
Casamassima	Casamassima	Bari
Casarano	Casarano	Lecce
Castellana Grotte	Castellana Grotte	Bari
Ceglie Messapica	Ceglie Messapica	Brindisi
Cisternino Città	Cisternino	Brindisi
Conversano	Conversano	Bari
Copertino	Copertino	Lecce
Corigliano d'Otranto	Corigliano d'Otranto	Lecce
Crispiano	Crispiano	Taranto
Crispiano San Raffaele	Crispiano	Taranto
Erchie-Torre Santa Susanna	Erchie	Brindisi
Francavilla Fontana	Francavilla Fontana	Brindisi
Gagliano Leuca	Gagliano del Capo	Lecce
Galatina	Galatina	Lecce
Galatone Città	Galatone	Lecce
Gallipoli Baia Verde	Gallipoli	Lecce
Gallipoli Porto	Gallipoli	Lecce
Gallipoli Via Agrigento	Gallipoli	Lecce
Gallipoli Via Salento	Gallipoli	Lecce
Gallipoli	Gallipoli	Lecce
Galugnano	San Donato di Lecce	Lecce
Giurdignano	Giurdignano	Lecce
Grotte di Castellana	Castellana Grotte	Bari
Guagnano	Guagnano	Lecce
Locorotondo	Locorotondo	Bari
Maglie	Maglie	Lecce
Manduria	Manduria	Taranto
Martina Franca	Martina Franca	Taranto
Martina Franca Colonne Grassi	Martina Franca	Taranto
Matino	Matino	Lecce
Melissano	Melissano	Lecce
Melpignano	Melpignano	Lecce
Miggiano-Specchio-Montesano	Miggiano	Lecce
Monteroni di Lecce	Arnesano	Lecce
Morciano-Barbarano-Castrignano-Giuliano	Morciano di Leuca	Lecce
Mungivacca	Bari	Bari
Muro Leccese	Muro Leccese	Lecce
Nardò Centrale	Nardò	Lecce
Nardò Città	Nardò	Lecce
Noci	Noci	Bari
Noicattaro	Noicattaro	Bari
Novoli	Novoli	Lecce
Otranto	Otranto	Lecce
Parabita	Parabita	Lecce
Pascarosa	Ceglie Messapica	Brindisi
Poggiardo	Poggiardo	Lecce
Presicce-Acquarica	Presicce-Acquarica	Lecce
Putignano	Putignano	Bari
Putignano San Pietro Piturno	Putignano	Bari
Putignano Monte Laureto	Putignano	Bari
Racale-Alliste	Racale	Lecce
Rutigliano	Rutigliano	Bari
Salice-Veglie	Salice Salentino	Lecce
Salve-Ruggiano	Salve	Lecce
Sanarica	Sanarica	Lecce
San Cesario di Lecce	San Cesario di Lecce	Lecce
San Donato di Lecce	San Donato di Lecce	Lecce
Sammichele	Sammichele di Bari	Bari
Sannicola	Sannicola	Lecce
San Pancrazio Salentino	San Pancrazio Salentino	Brindisi
San Paolo	Martina Franca	Taranto
Seclì-Neviano-Aradeo	Seclì	Lecce
Soleto	Soleto	Lecce
Spongano	Spongano	Lecce
Statte	Statte	Taranto
Sternatia	Sternatia	Lecce
Taranto Galese	Taranto	Taranto
Taviano	Taviano	Lecce
Tiggiano	Tiggiano	Lecce
Tricase	Tricase	Lecce
Triggiano	Triggiano	Bari
Tuglie	Tuglie	Lecce
Turi	Turi	Bari
Ugento-Taurisano	Ugento	Lecce
Valenzano	Valenzano	Bari
Valenzano Lamie	Valenzano	Bari
Zollino	Zollino	Lecce

== FAL stations ==
Station	Locality	Province
Altamura	Altamura	Bari
Bari Policlinico	Bari	Bari
Bari Scalo	Bari	Bari
Binetto	Binetto	Bari
Gravina in Puglia	Gravina in Puglia	Bari
Grumo Appula	Grumo Appula	Bari
Marinella	Altamura	Bari
Mellitto	Grumo Appula	Bari
Modugno	Modugno	Bari
Palo del Colle	Palo del Colle	Bari
Pescariello	Altamura	Bari
Toritto	Toritto	Bari

== FG stations ==
Station	Locality	Province
Apricena Città	Apricena	Foggia
Baia Santa Barbara	Rodi Garganico	Foggia
Bellariva	Vico del Gargano	Foggia
Cagnano Varano	Cagnano Varano	Foggia
Carpino	Carpino	Foggia
Guardiola	Rodi Garganico	Foggia
Ischitella	Ischitella	Foggia
Mulino di Mare	Rodi Garganico	Foggia
Murge Nere	Vico del Gargano	Foggia
Peschici Calenella	Vico del Gargano	Foggia
Portone Perrone	San Nicandro Garganico	Foggia
Rodi Garganico	Rodi Garganico	Foggia
Rodi Porto	Rodi Garganico	Foggia
San Nicandro Garganico	San Nicandro Garganico	Foggia
Sotto la Costa	Rodi Garganico	Foggia
Vico-San Menaio	Vico del Gargano	Foggia

== FNB stations ==
Station	Locality	Province
Andria	Andria	Barletta-Andria-Trani
Bari Aeroporto	Bari	Bari
Bari Europa	Bari	Bari
Barletta Scalo	Barletta	Barletta-Andria-Trani
Bitonto	Bitonto	Bari
Bitonto Santi Medici	Bitonto	Bari
Brigata Bari	Bari	Bari
Cecilia	Bari	Bari
Cittadella	Bari	Bari
Corato	Corato	Bari
Corato Sud-Ospedale	Corato	Bari
Enziteto	Bari	Bari
Fesca-San Girolamo	Bari	Bari
Francesco Crispi	Bari	Bari
Macchie	Bari	Bari
Ospedale San Paolo	Bari	Bari
Palese	Bari	Bari
Quintino Sella	Bari	Bari
Ruvo	Ruvo di Puglia	Bari
San Gabriele	Bari	Bari
Sovereto	Terlizzi	Bari
Terlizzi	Terlizzi	Bari
Tesoro	Bari	Bari

== See also ==
- Railway stations in Italy
- Ferrovie dello Stato
- Rail transport in Italy
- High-speed rail in Italy
- Transport in Italy
