= List of Bari metropolitan railway stations =

This is a list of railway stations served by the Bari metropolitan railway service.

- Aeroporto
- Bari Centrale
- Bitonto
- Bitonto SS. Medici
- Brigata Bari
- Cittadella
- Europa
- Fesca-San Girolamo
- Francesco Crispi
- Ospedale
- Palese
- Quintino Sella
- San Gabriele
- Tesoro
