= Spongano railway station =

Railway station in Spongano, Italy

Spongano
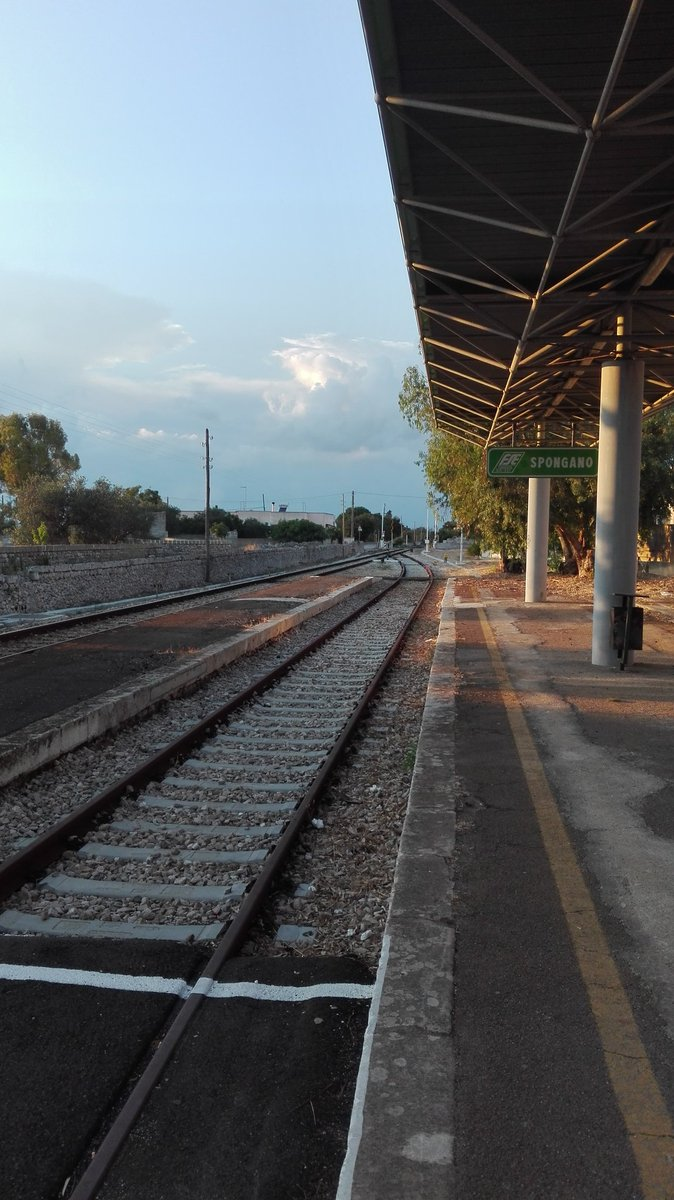
- Spongano railway station

General information
- Location: Spongano, Province of Lecce, Apulia; Italy
- Coordinates: 40°00′50″N 18°21′33″E
- Owner: Ferrovie del Sud Est
- Operator: Ferrovie del Sud Est
- Line: Maglie-Gagliano del Capo railway
- Platforms: 1

History
- Opened: 1910
Location
- Location within Apulia Location within Southern Italy Location within Italy

Spongano railway station is a railway station in Spongano, Italy, serving the locality of Spongano alongside the neighbouring municipality of Diso with its hamlet of Marittima. The station is located on the Maglie-Gagliano del Capo railway. The train services and the railway infrastructure are operated by Ferrovie del Sud Est.

== Train services ==
The station is served by the following service:

- Local services (Treno regionale) Zollino - Maglie - Tricase - Gagliano
