= Andria railway station =

Railway station in Italy

Andria
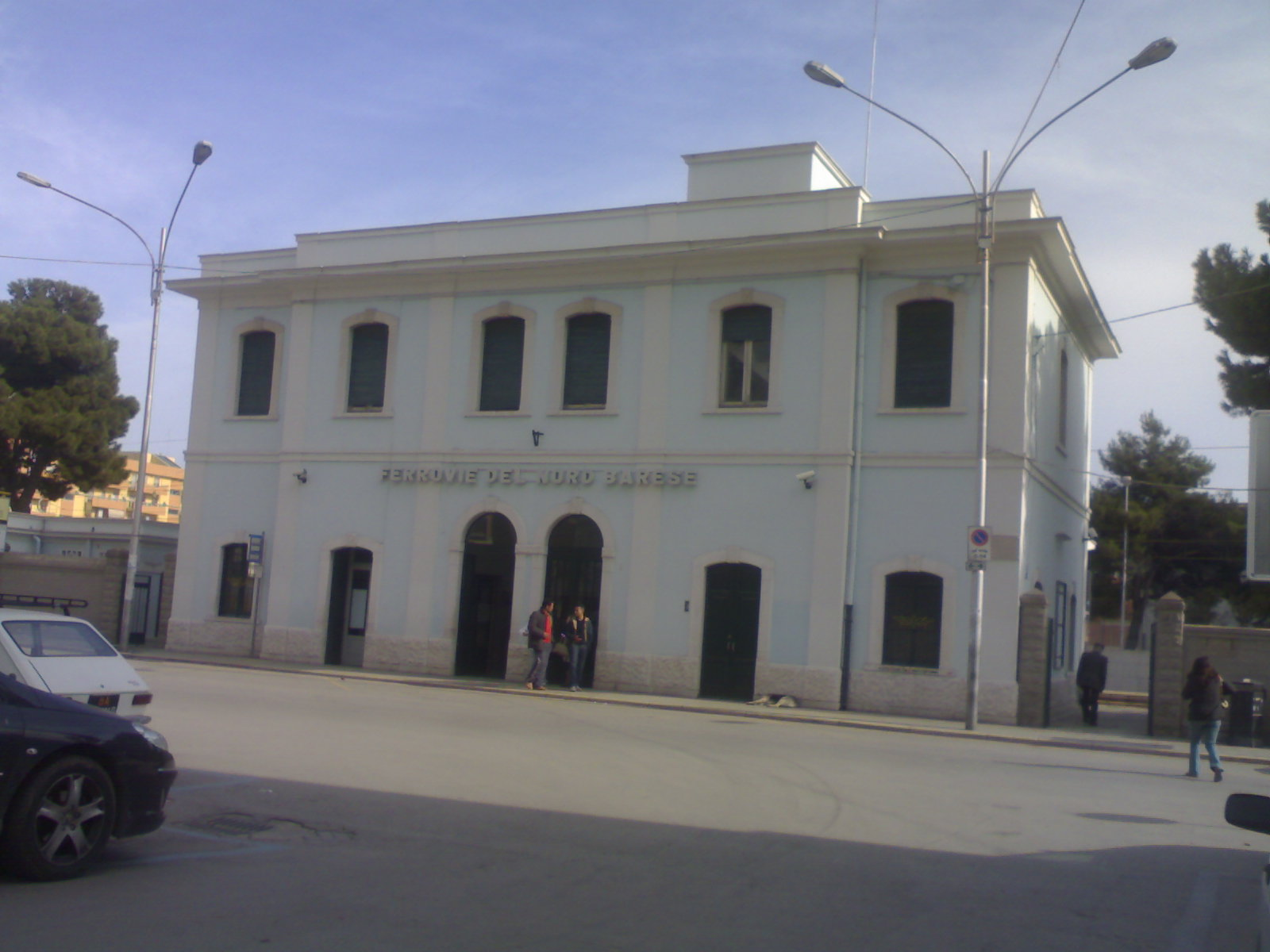
- Andria railway station

General information
- Location: Andria, Province of Barletta-Andria-Trani, Apulia; Italy
- Coordinates: 41°13′56″N 16°18′05″E
- Owner: Rete Ferroviaria Italiana
- Operator: Ferrotramviaria
- Line: Bari–Barletta railway
- Platforms: 2

History
- Opened: 1964; 62 years ago
Location
- Location within Apulia Location within Southern Italy Location within Italy

Andria (Italian: Stazione di Andria) is a railway station in the Italian town of Andria, in the Province of Barletta-Andria-Trani, Apulia. The station lies on the Bari–Barletta railway. The train services are operated by Ferrotramviaria.

On 12 July 2016, a train crash occurred between Andria and Corato.

== Train services ==
The station is served by the following service(s):

- Bari Metropolitan services (FR2) Barletta - Andria - Bitonto - Aeroporto - Bari

== See also ==
- Railway stations in Italy
- List of railway stations in Apulia
- Rail transport in Italy
- History of rail transport in Italy
