= Alessano–Corsano railway station =

Railway station in Alessano, Italy

Alessano–Corsano

General information
- Location: Alessano, Province of Lecce, Apulia; Italy
- Coordinates: 39°53′31.7″N 18°20′49.07″E
- Owner: Ferrovie del Sud Est
- Operator: Ferrovie del Sud Est
- Line: Maglie–Gagliano del Capo railway
- Platforms: 1

History
- Opened: 1910
Location
- Location within Apulia Location within Southern Italy Location within Italy

Alessano–Corsano railway station is a railway station in Alessano, Italy, built to serve the towns of Alessano and Corsano. The station is located on the Maglie–Gagliano del Capo railway. The train services and the railway infrastructure are operated by Ferrovie del Sud Est.

== Train services ==
The station is served by the following service:

- Local services (Treno regionale) Zollino - Maglie - Tricase - Gagliano
