= Trepuzzi railway station =

Railway station in Italy

Trepuzzi

General information
- Location: Piazza della Stazione; Trepuzzi LE; Trepuzzi, Lecce, Apulia; Italy
- Coordinates: 40°24′34″N 18°04′36″E
- Operator: Rete Ferroviaria Italiana
- Line: Ancona–Lecce (Trenitalia)
- Platforms: 2
- Train operators: Trenitalia

Other information
- Classification: Bronze

History
- Opened: 16 January 1866; 160 years ago
Location
- Location within Apulia Location within Italy

Trepuzzi (Italian: Stazione di Trepuzzi) is a railway station in the Italian town of Trepuzzi, in the Province of Lecce, Apulia. The station lies on the Adriatic Railway (Ancona–Lecce) and was opened on 16 January 1866. The train services are operated by Trenitalia.

== Train services ==
The station is served by the following service(s):

- Regional services (Treno regionale) Bari - Monopoli - Brindisi - Lecce
- Regional services (Treno regionale) Foggia -Bari - Monopoli - Brindisi - Lecce

== See also ==
- Railway stations in Italy
- List of railway stations in Apulia
- Rail transport in Italy
- History of rail transport in Italy
