= Tiggiano railway station =

Railway station in Tiggiano, Italy

Tiggiano

General information
- Location: Tiggiano, Province of Lecce, Apulia; Italy
- Coordinates: 39°54′16.76″N 18°21′28.25″E
- Owner: Ferrovie del Sud Est
- Operator: Ferrovie del Sud Est
- Line: Maglie-Gagliano del Capo railway
- Platforms: 1

History
- Opened: 1910
Location
- Location within Apulia Location within Southern Italy Location within Italy

Tiggiano railway station is a railway station in Tiggiano, Italy. The station is located on the Maglie-Gagliano del Capo railway. The train services and the railway infrastructure are operated by Ferrovie del Sud Est.

== Train services ==
The station is served by the following service:

- Local services (Treno regionale) Zollino - Maglie - Tricase - Gagliano
