= Putignano San Pietro Piturno railway station =

Railway station in Italy

Putignano San Pietro Piturno

General information
- Location: San Pietro Piturno, Bari, Apulia; Italy
- Coordinates: 40°52′12″N 17°05′17″E
- Owner: Rete Ferroviaria Italiana
- Line: Bari-Casamassima-Putignano railway
- Platforms: 1
- Train operators: Ferrovie del Sud Est

Other information
- Classification: Bronze

History
- Closed: 25 April 2021
Location
- Location within Apulia Location within Southern Italy Location within Italy

Putignano San Pietro Piturno railway station (Italian: Stazione di Putignano San Pietro Piturno) was a railway station in San Pietro Piturno, Italy. The station was located on the Bari-Casamassima-Putignano railway. It was closed on 25 April 2021.
