= Muro Leccese railway station =

Railway station in Muro Leccese, Italy

Muro Leccesse

General information
- Location: Muro Leccese, Province of Lecce, Apulia; Italy
- Coordinates: 40°05′55″N 18°20′05″E
- Owner: Ferrovie del Sud Est
- Operator: Ferrovie del Sud Est
- Line: Maglie-Gagliano del Capo railway
- Platforms: 2

History
- Opened: 1910
Location
- Location within Apulia Location within Southern Italy Location within Italy

Muro Lecesse railway station is a railway station in Muro Leccese, Italy. The station is located on the Maglie-Gagliano del Capo railway. The train services and the railway infrastructure are operated by Ferrovie del Sud Est.

== Train services ==
The station is served by the following service:

- Local services (Treno regionale) Zollino - Maglie - Tricase - Gagliano
