= Turi railway station =

Railway station in Italy

Turi
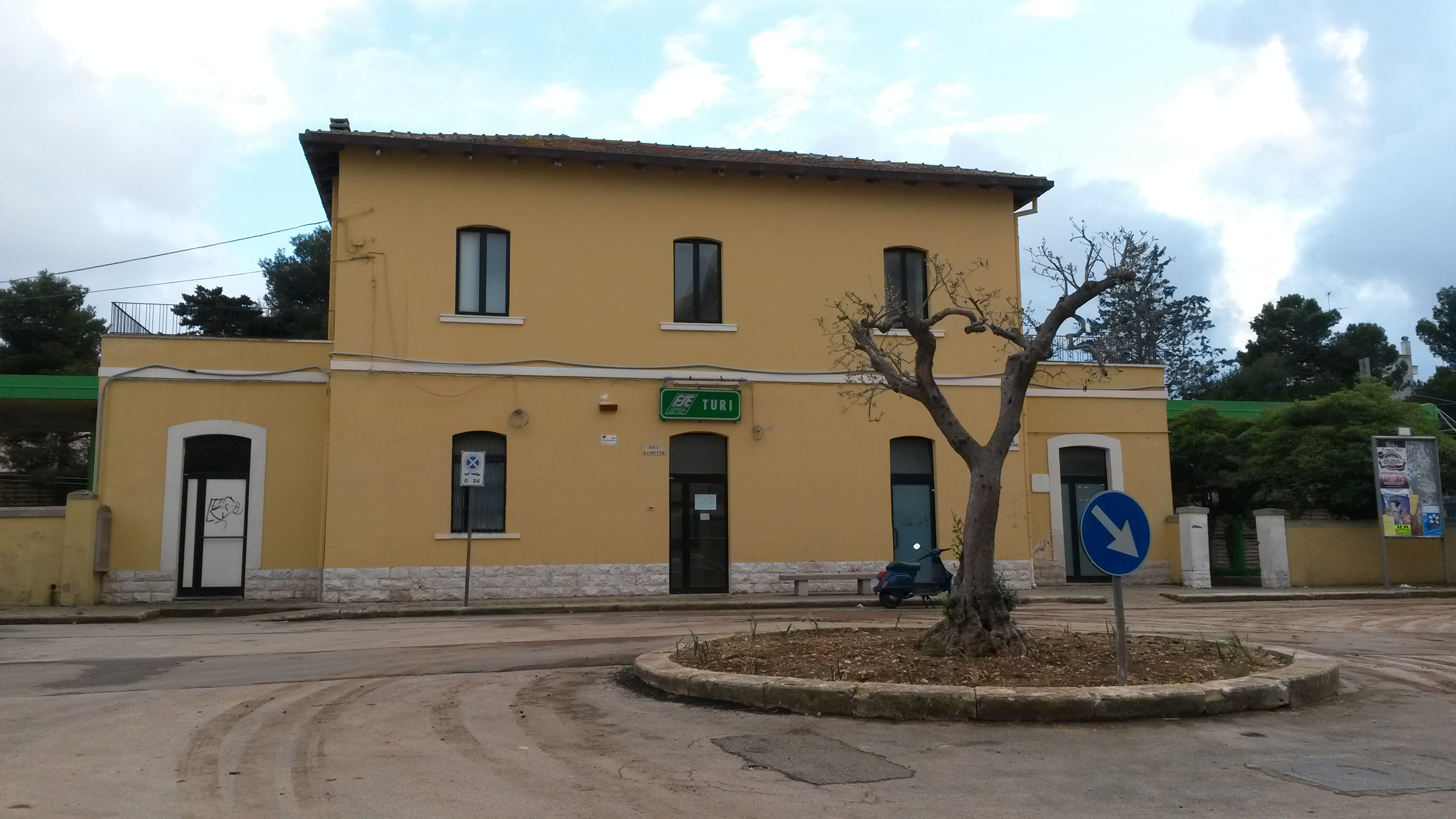
- Turi railway station

General information
- Location: Turi, Bari, Apulia; Italy
- Coordinates: 40°54′51″N 17°01′03″E
- Owner: Ferrovie del Sud Est
- Line: Bari-Casamassima-Putignano railway
- Platforms: 2
- Train operators: Ferrovie del Sud Est
Location
- Location within Apulia Location within Southern Italy Location within Italy

Turi is a railway station in Turi, Italy. The station is located on the Bari-Casamassima-Putignano railway. The train services and the railway infrastructure are operated by Ferrovie del Sud Est.

== Train services ==
The station is served by the following service(s):

- Local services (Treno regionale) Bari - Casamassima - Putignano
