= Andrano–Castiglione railway station =

Italian railway station

Andrano–Castiglione

General information
- Location: Castiglione d'Otranto, Province of Lecce, Apulia; Italy
- Coordinates: 39°58′46.02″N 18°20′23.41″E
- Owner: Ferrovie del Sud Est
- Operator: Ferrovie del Sud Est
- Line: Maglie–Gagliano del Capo railway
- Platforms: 2

History
- Opened: 1910
Location
- Location within Apulia Location within Southern Italy Location within Italy

Andrano–Castiglione railway station is a railway station built to serve the town of Castiglione d'Otranto, part of the municipality of Andrano, Italy. The station is located on the Maglie–Gagliano del Capo railway. The train services and the railway infrastructure are operated by Ferrovie del Sud Est.

== Train services ==
The station is served by the following service:

- Local services (Treno regionale) Zollino - Maglie - Tricase - Gagliano
