= Adelfia railway station =

Railway station in Adelfia, Italy

Adelfia

General information
- Location: Adelfia, Bari, Apulia; Italy
- Coordinates: 41°00′23″N 16°52′19″E
- Owner: Ferrovie del Sud Est
- Line: Bari-Casamassima-Putignano railway
- Platforms: 2
- Train operators: Ferrovie del Sud Est

Construction
- Parking: yes
Location
- Location within Apulia

Adelfia is a railway station in Adelfia, Italy. The station is located on the Bari-Casamassima-Putignano railway. The train services and the railway infrastructure are operated by Ferrovie del Sud Est.

== Train services ==
The station is served by the following service(s):

- Local services (Treno regionale) Bari - Casamassima - Putignano
