= Cisternino railway station =

Railway station in Apulia, Italy

Cisternino
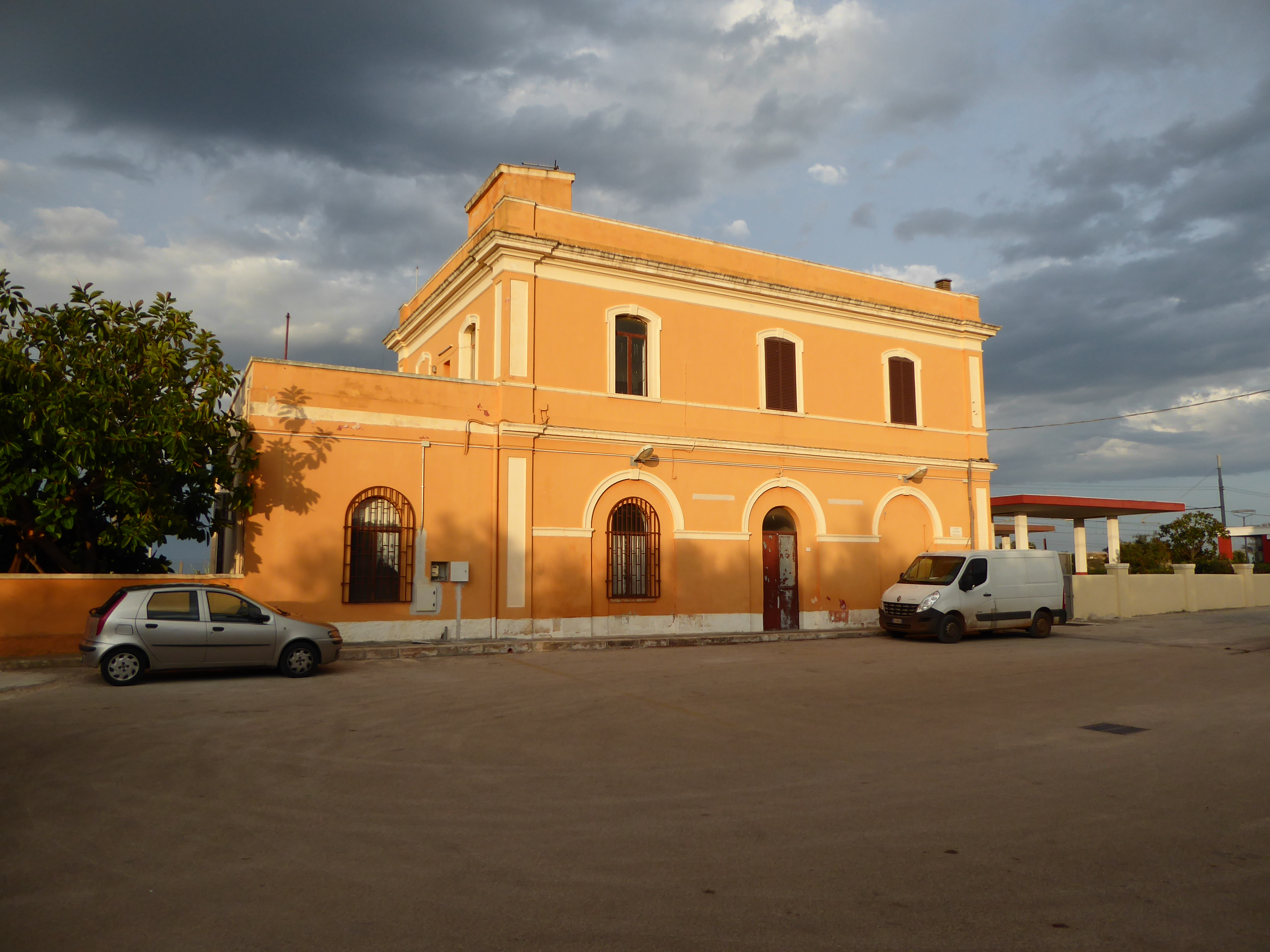

General information
- Location: Cisternino; Cisternino, Brindisi, Apulia; Italy
- Coordinates: 40°44′13″N 17°41′01″E
- Operator: Rete Ferroviaria Italiana
- Line: Ancona–Lecce (Trenitalia)
- Platforms: 2
- Train operators: Trenitalia

Other information
- Classification: Bronze

History
- Opened: 1865; 161 years ago
Location
- Location within Apulia Location within Italy

Cisternino (Italian: Stazione di Cisternino) is a railway station 16 km from the Italian town of Cisternino, in the Province of Brindisi, Apulia. The station lies on the Adriatic Railway (Ancona–Lecce) and was opened in 1865. The train services are operated by Trenitalia.

== Train services ==
The station is served by the following service(s):

- Regional services (Treno regionale) Bari - Monopoli - Brindisi - Lecce

== See also ==
- Railway stations in Italy
- List of railway stations in Apulia
- Rail transport in Italy
- History of rail transport in Italy
