= Apricena Città railway station =

Railway station in Italy

Apricena Città

General information
- Location: Apricena, Apulia; Italy
- Coordinates: 41°46′45″N 15°26′49″E
- System: Railway Station
- Operator: Ferrovie del Gargano
- Line: San Severo–Peschici railway
- Platforms: 2
- Tracks: 2

History
- Opened: 14 December 2014; 11 years ago
Location
- Location within Apulia Location within Southern Italy Location within Italy

Apricena Città (Italian: Stazione di Apricena Città) is a railway station serving the town of Apricena, in the region of Apulia, southern Italy. The station is located on the San Severo–Peschici railway. The train services are operated by Ferrovie del Gargano. The station opened on 14 December 2014 as part of the first phase of the new direct line between San Severo and San Nicandro Garganico. The second phase, from Apricena Città to San Nicandro Garganico opened on 13 June 2016.

== Train services ==
The station is served by the following services:

- Regional services (Treno regionale) Foggia - San Severo - Apricena - Rodi - Peschichi

== See also ==
- History of rail transport in Italy
- List of railway stations in Apulia
- Rail transport in Italy
- Railway stations in Italy
