= Cannole railway station =

Railway station in Cannole, Italy

Cannole

General information
- Location: Cannole, Province of Lecce, Apulia; Italy
- Coordinates: 40°09′21.73″N 18°22′22.5″E
- Owner: Ferrovie del Sud Est
- Operator: Ferrovie del Sud Est
- Line: Lecce-Otranto railway
- Platforms: 1

History
- Opened: 1872
Location
- Location within Apulia Location within Southern Italy Location within Italy

Cannole railway station is a railway station in Cannole, Italy. The station is located on the Lecce-Otranto railway. The train services and the railway infrastructure are operated by Ferrovie del Sud Est.

== Train services ==
The station is served by the following service:
