= Casamassima railway station =

Railway station in Casamassima, Italy

Casamassima

General information
- Location: Casamassima, Bari, Apulia; Italy
- Coordinates: 40°57′15″N 16°54′53″E
- Owner: Ferrovie del Sud Est
- Line: Bari-Casamassima-Putignano railway
- Platforms: 2
- Train operators: Ferrovie del Sud Est

History
- Opened: 1905
Location
- Location within Apulia Location within Southern Italy Location within Italy

Casamassima is a railway station in Casamassima, Italy. The station is located on the Bari-Casamassima-Putignano railway. The train services and the railway infrastructure are operated by Ferrovie del Sud Est.

== Train services ==
The station is served by the following service(s):

- Local services (Treno regionale) Bari - Casamassima - Putignano
