= Tricase railway station =

Railway station in Tricase, Italy

Tricase
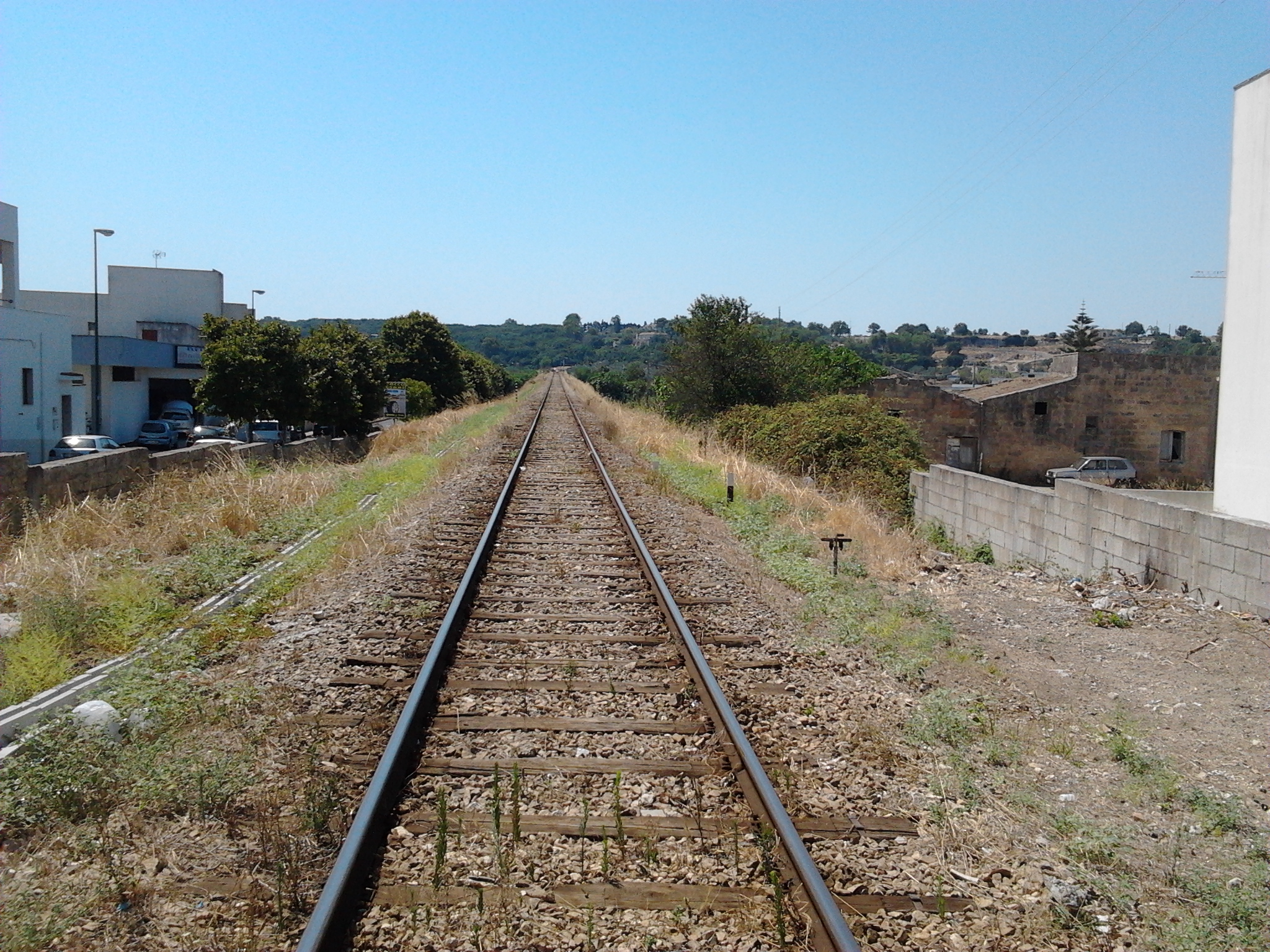
- Tricase railway station

General information
- Location: Tricase, Province of Lecce, Apulia; Italy
- Coordinates: 39°56′00.17″N 18°21′09.44″E
- Owner: Ferrovie del Sud Est
- Operator: Ferrovie del Sud Est
- Line: Maglie-Gagliano del Capo railway
- Platforms: 2

History
- Opened: 1910
Location
- Location within Apulia Location within Southern Italy Location within Italy

Tricase railway station is a railway station in Tricase, Italy, built to serve the locality of Tricase, alongside its hamlets Depressa and Lucugnano. The station is located on the Maglie-Gagliano del Capo railway. The train services and the railway infrastructure are operated by Ferrovie del Sud Est.

== Train services ==
The station is served by the following service:

- Local services (Treno regionale) Zollino - Maglie - Tricase - Gagliano
