= Bari Palese Macchie railway station =

Railway station in Italy

Bari Palese Macchie

General information
- Location: Macchie; Macchie, Bari, Apulia; Italy
- Coordinates: 41°09′05″N 16°46′01″E
- Operator: Rete Ferroviaria Italiana
- Line: Ancona–Lecce (Trenitalia)
- Platforms: 2
- Train operators: Trenitalia

Other information
- Classification: Bronze
Location
- Location within Apulia Location within Italy

Bari Palese Macchie (Italian: Stazione di Bari Palese Macchie) is a railway station in the Italian town of Macchie, in the Province of Bari, Apulia. The station lies on the Adriatic Railway (Ancona–Lecce). The train services are operated by Trenitalia.

== Train services ==
The station is served by the following service(s):

- Regional services (Treno regionale) Foggia - Barletta - Bari

== See also ==
- Railway stations in Italy
- List of railway stations in Apulia
- Rail transport in Italy
- History of rail transport in Italy
