= Corigliano d'Otranto railway station =

Railway station in Apulia, Italy

Corigliano d'Otranto

General information
- Location: Bagnolo del Salento, Province of Lecce, Apulia; Italy
- Coordinates: 40°09′42.49″N 18°15′44.47″E
- Owner: Ferrovie del Sud Est
- Operator: Ferrovie del Sud Est
- Line: Lecce-Otranto railway
- Platforms: 2

History
- Opened: 1896
Location
- Location within Apulia Location within Southern Italy Location within Italy

The Corigliano d'Otranto railway station is a railway station in Corigliano d'Otranto, Italy. The station is located on the Lecce-Otranto railway. The train services and the railway infrastructure are operated by Ferrovie del Sud Est.

== Train services ==
The station is served by the following service:
