= Bari La Fitta railway station =

Railway station in Bari, Italy

Bari La Fitta

General information
- Location: Via Corticelli; Ceglie del Campo, Bari, Apulia; Italy
- Coordinates: 41°03′40″N 16°52′18″E
- Owner: Ferrovie del Sud Est
- Line: Bari-Casamassima-Putignano railway
- Platforms: 1
- Train operators: Ferrovie del Sud Est

History
- Opened: 2008
Location
- Location within Apulia Location within Southern Italy Location within Italy

Bari La Fitta is a railway station in Ceglie del Campo, Italy. The station is located on the Bari-Casamassima-Putignano railway. The train services and the railway infrastructure are operated by Ferrovie del Sud Est.

== Train services ==
The station is served by the following service(s):

- Local services (Treno regionale) Bari - Casamassima - Putignano
