= Trinitapoli–San Ferdinando di Puglia railway station =

Railway station in Trinitapoli, Italy

Trinitapoli San Ferdinando di Puglia

General information
- Location: Trinitapoli; Trinitapoli, Barletta-Andria-Trani, Apulia; Italy
- Coordinates: 41°20′58″N 16°05′28″E
- Operator: Rete Ferroviaria Italiana
- Line: Ancona–Lecce (Trenitalia)
- Platforms: 3
- Train operators: Trenitalia

Other information
- Classification: Silver
Location
- Location within Apulia Location within Italy

Trinitapoli–San Ferdinando di Puglia (Italian: Stazione di Trinitapoli–San Ferdinando di Puglia) is a railway station in the Italian town of Trinitapoli and also for San Ferdinando di Puglia, in the Province of Barletta-Andria-Trani, Apulia. The station lies on the Adriatic Railway (Ancona–Lecce). The train services are operated by Trenitalia.

== Train services ==
The station is served by the following service(s):

- Regional services (Treno regionale) Foggia - Barletta - Bari

== See also ==
- Railway stations in Italy
- List of railway stations in Apulia
- Rail transport in Italy
- History of rail transport in Italy
