= Poggiardo railway station =

Railway station in Poggiardo, Italy

Poggiardo

General information
- Location: Poggiardo, Province of Lecce, Apulia; Italy
- Coordinates: 40°03′06″N 18°22′13″E
- Owner: Ferrovie del Sud Est
- Operator: Ferrovie del Sud Est
- Line: Maglie-Gagliano del Capo railway
- Platforms: 2

History
- Opened: 1910
Location
- Location within Apulia Location within Southern Italy Location within Italy

Poggiardo railway station is a railway station in Poggiardo, Italy. The station is located on the Maglie-Gagliano del Capo railway. The train services and the railway infrastructure are operated by Ferrovie del Sud Est.

== Train services ==
The station is served by the following service:

- Local services (Treno regionale) Zollino - Maglie - Tricase - Gagliano
