= Macchie railway station =

Railway station in Bari, Italy

Macchie

General information
- Location: Bari, Province of Bari, Apulia; Italy
- Coordinates: 41°08′53″N 16°46′08″E
- Owner: Rete Ferroviaria Italiana
- Operator: Ferrotramviaria
- Line: Bari–Barletta railway
- Platforms: 2
Location
- Location within Apulia Location within Southern Italy Location within Italy

Macchie (Italian: Stazione di Palese) is a railway station in the Italian district of Palese-Macchie in the city of Bari, in the Province of Bari, Apulia. The station lies on the Bari–Barletta railway. The train services are operated by Ferrotramviaria.

== Train services ==
The station is served by the following service(s):

- Bari Metropolitan services (FR1) Bitonto - Palese - Bari

== See also ==
- Railway stations in Italy
- List of railway stations in Apulia
- Rail transport in Italy
- History of rail transport in Italy
