= San Vito dei Normanni railway station =

Railway station in San Vito dei Normanni, Italy

San Vito dei Normanni

General information
- Location: San Vito dei Normanni; San Vito dei Normanni, Brindisi, Apulia; Italy
- Coordinates: 40°39′00″N 17°49′06″E
- Operator: Rete Ferroviaria Italiana
- Line: Ancona–Lecce (Trenitalia)
- Platforms: 2
- Train operators: Trenitalia

Other information
- Classification: Bronze

History
- Opened: 29 April 1865; 161 years ago
- Closed: unknown

Passengers
- 0: 0 0% (0)
Location
- Location within Apulia Location within Italy

San Vito dei Normanni (Italian: Stazione di San Vito dei Normanni) is a closed railway station near the Italian town of San Vito dei Normanni, in the Province of Brindisi, Apulia. The station lies on the Adriatic Railway (Ancona–Lecce) and was opened on date 29 April 1865. The train services not stop are operated by Trenitalia.

== Train services ==
The station was served by the following service(s):

- Regional services not stop here (Treno regionale) Bari - Monopoli - Brindisi - Lecce

== See also ==
- Railway stations in Italy
- List of railway stations in Apulia
- Rail transport in Italy
- History of rail transport in Italy
