= Botrugno =

Botrugno Griko: Botruòduros
- Comune
- Comune di Botrugno
- Location within Italy Location within Apulia
- Coordinates: 40°4′N 18°19′E
- Country: Italy
- Region: Apulia
- Province: Lecce (LE)
- Frazioni: San Cassiano, Sanarica, Scorrano, Supersano

Area
  - Total: 9 km^{2} (3.5 sq mi)
- Elevation: 92 m (302 ft)

Population (November 2008)
  - Total: 2,936
  - Density: 330/km^{2} (840/sq mi)
- Demonym: Botrugnesi
- Time zone: UTC+1 (CET)
  - Summer (DST): UTC+2 (CEST)
- Postal code: 73020
- Dialing code: 0836
- ISTAT code: 075009
- Patron saint: Saint Oronzo
- Saint day: 26 August
- Website: Official website

Botrugno (Salentino: Vitrùgna) is a town and comune in the Italian province of Lecce in the Apulia region of south-east Italy.

The main sight is the marquisal palace, which was erected in 16th century and restored during the 17th century. It was Castriota Scanderbeg family in 1725 who built the baroque-style balcony.
