= Guagnano railway station =

Railway station in Italy

Guagnano

General information
- Location: Guagnano, Province of Lecce, Apulia; Italy
- Coordinates: 40°23′55″N 17°56′39″E
- Owner: Ferrovie del Sud Est
- Operator: Ferrovie del Sud Est
- Line: Martina Franca-Lecce railway
- Platforms: 2
Location
- Location within Apulia Location within Southern Italy Location within Italy

Guagnano is a railway station in Guagnano, Italy. The station is located on the Martina Franca-Lecce railway. The train services and the railway infrastructure are operated by Ferrovie del Sud Est.

== Train services ==
The station is served by the following service(s):

- Local services (Treno regionale) Martina Franca - Francavilla Fontana - Novoli - Lecce
