= Capurso railway station =

Railway station in Apulia, Italy

Capurso

General information
- Location: Capurso, Bari, Apulia; Italy
- Coordinates: 41°02′57″N 16°55′25″E
- Owner: Ferrovie del Sud Est
- Line: Bari–Martina Franca–Taranto railway
- Platforms: 2
- Train operators: Ferrovie del Sud Est

History
- Closed: June 2019
Location
- Location within Apulia Location within Southern Italy Location within Italy

Capurso railway station (Italian: Stazione di Capurso) is a railway station in Capurso, Italy. The station is located on the Bari–Martina Franca–Taranto railway. The train services and the railway infrastructure are operated by Ferrovie del Sud Est.

== Services ==
As of the June 2025 timetable change, the following services stop at Capurso:

- Regionale: local bus service between Bari Centrale and Martina Franca.
