= San Cesario di Lecce railway station =

Railway station in San Cesario di Lecce, Italy

San Cesario di Lecce

General information
- Location: San Cesario di Lecce, Province of Lecce, Apulia; Italy
- Coordinates: 40°18′14″N 18°09′59″E
- Owner: Ferrovie del Sud Est
- Operator: Ferrovie del Sud Est
- Line: Lecce–Otranto railway
- Platforms: 2
Location
- Location within Apulia Location within Southern Italy Location within Italy

San Cesario di Lecce is a railway station in San Cesario di Lecce, Italy. The station is located on the Lecce–Otranto railway. The train services and the railway infrastructure are operated by Ferrovie del Sud Est.

== Train services ==
The station is served by the following service(s):

- Local services (Treno regionale) Lecce - Zollino - Nardo - Gallipoli
