= Galugnano railway station =

Railway station in Galugnano, Italy

Galugnano

General information
- Location: Galugnano, Province of Lecce, Apulia; Italy
- Coordinates: 40°15′23″N 18°12′23″E
- Owner: Ferrovie del Sud Est
- Operator: Ferrovie del Sud Est
- Line: Lecce–Otranto railway
- Platforms: 2
Location
- Location within Apulia Location within Southern Italy Location within Italy

Galugnano is a railway station in Galugnano, Italy. The station is located on the Lecce–Otranto railway. The train services and the railway infrastructure are operated by Ferrovie del Sud Est.

== Train services ==
The station is served by the following service(s):

- Local services (Treno regionale) Lecce - Zollino - Nardo - Gallipoli
