= Triggiano railway station =

Railway station in Triggiano, Italy

Triggiano
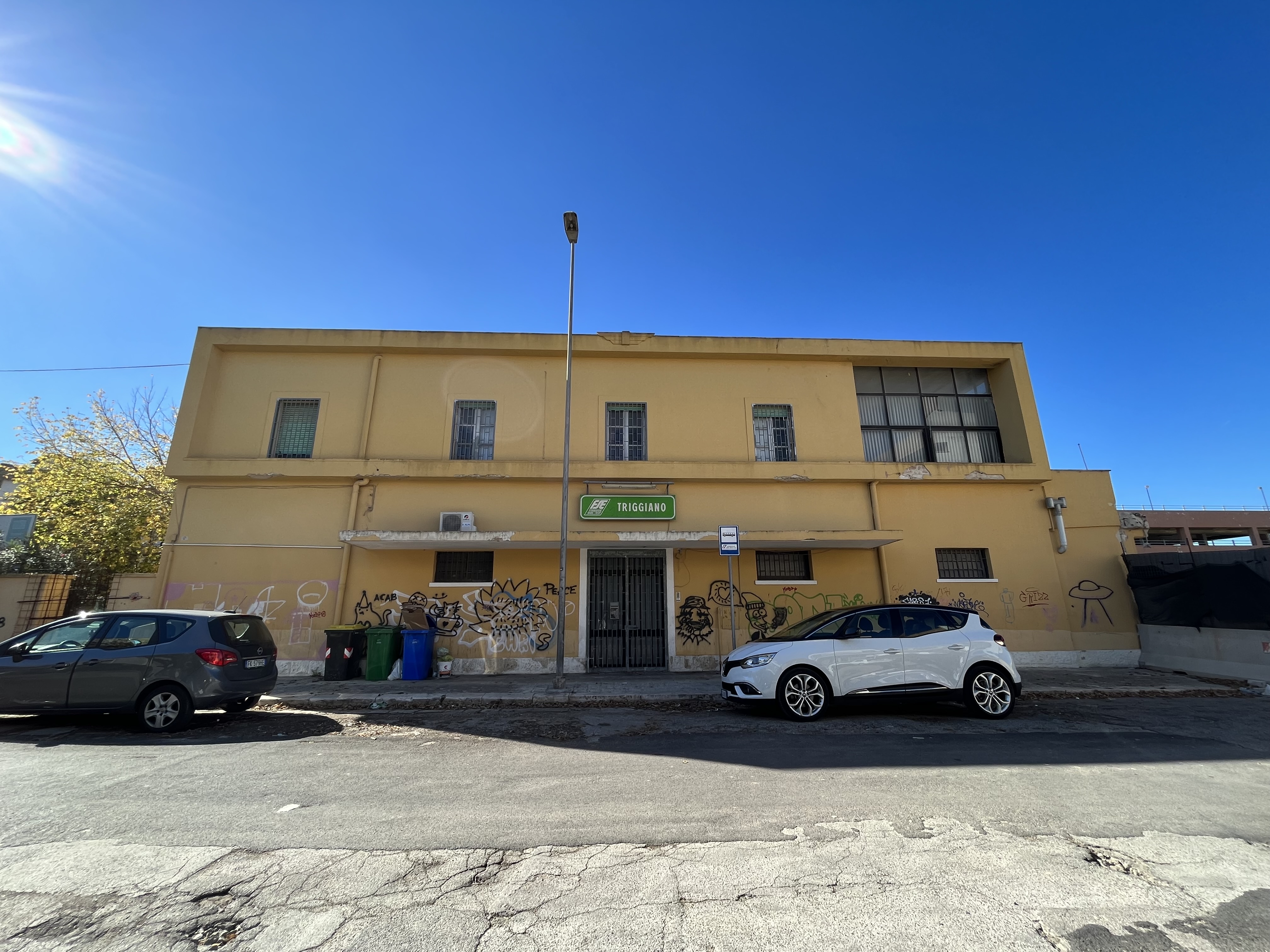
- The station building in 2022

General information
- Location: Triggiano, Bari, Apulia; Italy
- Coordinates: 41°03′51″N 16°54′59″E
- Owner: Ferrovie del Sud Est
- Line: Bari–Martina Franca–Taranto railway
- Platforms: 2
- Train operators: Ferrovie del Sud Est

History
- Opened: 12 August 1900
- Closed: June 2019
Location
- Location within Apulia Location within Southern Italy Location within Italy

Triggiano railway station (Italian: Stazione di Triggiano) is a railway station in Triggiano, Italy. The station is located on the Bari–Martina Franca–Taranto railway. The train services and the railway infrastructure are operated by Ferrovie del Sud Est.

== Services ==
As of the June 2025 timetable change, the following services stop at Triggiano:

- Regionale: local bus service between Bari Centrale and Martina Franca.
