= Altamura railway station =

Railway station in Italy

Altamura

General information
- Location: Altamura, Province of Bari, Apulia; Italy
- Coordinates: 40°50′15″N 16°33′04″E
- Owner: Rete Ferroviaria Italiana
- Operator: Trenitalia
- Line: Rocchetta Sant'Antonio-Gioia del Colle railway line
- Platforms: 3

History
- Closed: 11 December 2016
Location
- Location within Apulia Location within Italy

Altamura railway station (Italian: Stazione di Altamura) was a railway station in Altamura, Italy. The station was located on the Rocchetta Sant'Antonio-Gioia del Colle railway line and the train services were operated by Trenitalia. It was shut down in 2016.

It was physically adjacent to the station of the Ferrovie Appulo Lucane, which remains in use.
