= Fesca–San Girolamo railway station =

Railway station in Bari, Italy

Fesca–San Girolamo

General information
- Location: Bari, Province of Bari, Apulia; Italy
- Coordinates: 41°07′47″N 16°49′25″E
- Owner: Rete Ferroviaria Italiana
- Operator: Ferrotramviaria
- Line: Bari–Barletta railway
- Platforms: 5

History
- Opened: 1963; 63 years ago
Location
- Location within Apulia Location within Southern Italy Location within Italy

Fesca–San Girolamo (Italian: Stazione di Fesca–San Girolamo) is a railway station in the Italian city of Bari, in the Province of Bari, Apulia. The station lies on the Bari–Barletta railway. The train services are operated by Ferrotramviaria.

== Train services ==
The station is served by the Bari Metropolitan services (FM1) Ospedale.

== See also ==
- Railway stations in Italy
- List of railway stations in Apulia
- Rail transport in Italy
- History of rail transport in Italy
