= Oria railway station =

Railway station in Oria, Apulia, Italy

Oria

General information
- Location: Oria, Province of Brindisi, Apulia; Italy
- Coordinates: 40°30′29″N 17°38′47″E
- Owner: Rete Ferroviaria Italiana
- Operator: Trenitalia
- Line: Taranto–Brindisi railway
- Platforms: 2

History
- Opened: 6 January 1886; 140 years ago
Location
- Location within Apulia Location within Italy

Oria is a railway station in Oria, Italy. The station is located on the Taranto–Brindisi railway. The train services are operated by Trenitalia.

== Train services ==
The station is served by the following service(s):

- Local services (Treno regionale) Taranto - Francavilla Fontana - Brindisi
