= Bari Europa railway station =

Italian railway station

Europa

General information
- Location: Bari; Bari, Bari, Apulia; Italy
- Coordinates: 41°08′07″N 16°46′53″E
- Operator: Rete Ferroviaria Italiana
- Line: Bari–Bitonto railway (Trenitalia)
- Platforms: 2
- Train operators: Ferrotramviaria

Other information
- Classification: Bronze

History
- Opened: 20 July 2013; 13 years ago
Location
- Location within Apulia Location within Southern Italy Location within Italy

Europa (Italian: Stazione di Europa) is a railway station in the Italian city of Bari, in the Province of Bari, Apulia. The station lies on the Bari–Bitonto railway. The train services are operated by Ferrotramviaria.

== Train services ==
The station is served by the following service(s):

- Bari Metropolitan services (FR2) Barletta - Andria - Bitonto - Aeroporto - Bari
- Bari Metropolitan services (FM2) Bitonto - Aeroporto - Bari

== See also ==
- Railway stations in Italy
- List of railway stations in Apulia
- Rail transport in Italy
- History of rail transport in Italy
