= Corato railway station =

Italian railway station

Corato

General information
- Location: Corato, Province of Bari, Apulia; Italy
- Coordinates: 41°09′23″N 16°25′04″E
- Owner: Rete Ferroviaria Italiana
- Operator: Ferrotramviaria
- Line: Bari–Barletta railway
- Platforms: 2

History
- Opened: 1964; 62 years ago
Location
- Location within Apulia Location within Southern Italy Location within Italy

Corato (Italian: Stazione di Corato) is a railway station in the Italian town of Corato, in the Province of Bari, Apulia. The station lies on the Bari–Barletta railway. The train services are operated by Ferrotramviaria.

== Train services ==
The station is served by the following service(s):

- Bari Metropolitan services (FR2) Barletta - Andria - Bitonto - Aeroporto - Bari

== See also ==
- Railway stations in Italy
- List of railway stations in Apulia
- Rail transport in Italy
- History of rail transport in Italy
