= Modugno Città railway station =

Railway station in Italy

Modugno Città

General information
- Location: Modugno, Province of Bari, Apulia; Italy
- Coordinates: 41°05′10″N 16°46′44″E
- Owner: Rete Ferroviaria Italiana
- Operator: Trenitalia; Ferrovie Appulo Lucane
- Lines: Bari–Taranto railway Bari–Matera railway
- Platforms: 3

Services
Location
- Location within Apulia Location within Italy

Modugno Città is a railway station in Modugno, Italy. The station is located on the Bari–Taranto railway and Bari–Matera railway. The train services are operated by Trenitalia and Ferrovie Appulo Lucane.

== Train services ==
The station is served by the following service(s):

- Local services (Treno regionale) Bari - Gioia del Colle - Taranto
- Local services (Treno regionale) Bari - Altamura - Gravina - Potenza
- Local services (Treno regionale) Bari - Altamura - Matera
