= Erchie–Torre Santa Susanna railway station =

Railway station in Erchie, Italy

Erchie–Torre Santa Susanna

General information
- Location: Erchie, Province of Brindisi, Apulia; Italy
- Coordinates: 40°24′47″N 17°44′39″E
- Owner: Ferrovie del Sud Est
- Operator: Ferrovie del Sud Est
- Line: Martina Franca–Lecce railway
- Platforms: 2
Location
- Location within Apulia Location within Southern Italy Location within Italy

Erchie–Torre Santa Susanna is a railway station in Erchie, Italy, on the Martina Franca–Lecce railway. The train services and the railway infrastructure are operated by Ferrovie del Sud Est.

== Train services ==
The station is served by the following service(s):

- Local services (Treno regionale) Martina Franca - Francavilla Fontana - Novoli - Lecce
