= Melpignano railway station =

Railway station in Italy

Melpignano

General information
- Location: Melpignano, Province of Lecce, Apulia; Italy
- Coordinates: 40°08′52.55″N 18°16′37.8″E
- Owner: Ferrovie del Sud Est
- Operator: Ferrovie del Sud Est
- Line: Lecce-Otranto railway
- Platforms: 1

History
- Opened: 1922
Location
- Location within Apulia Location within Southern Italy Location within Italy

Melpignano railway station is a railway station in Melpignano, Italy. The station is located on the Lecce-Otranto railway. The train services and the railway infrastructure are operated by Ferrovie del Sud Est.

== Train services ==
The station is served by the following service:
