= Gravina in Puglia railway station =

Railway station in Italy

Gravina in Puglia

General information
- Location: Gravina in Puglia, Province of Bari, Apulia; Italy
- Coordinates: 40°49′32″N 16°25′05″E
- Owner: Rete Ferroviaria Italiana
- Operator: Trenitalia
- Line: Rocchetta Sant'Antonio-Gioia del Colle railway line
- Platforms: 3

History
- Opened: 1891
- Closed: 11 December 2016
Location
- Location within Apulia Location within Italy

Gravina in Puglia was a railway station at Gravina in Puglia, a town in Apulia, southern Italy. The station is located on the Rocchetta Sant'Antonio-Gioia del Colle railway line. Service ended in 2016.

It was physically adjacent to the station of the Ferrovie Appulo Lucane, which remains in use.
