= Palese railway station =

Railway station in Italy

Palese

General information
- Location: Bari, Province of Bari, Apulia; Italy
- Coordinates: 41°08′56″N 16°46′50″E
- Owner: Rete Ferroviaria Italiana
- Operator: Ferrotramviaria
- Line: Bari–Barletta railway
- Platforms: 3
Location
- Location within Apulia Location within Southern Italy Location within Italy

Palese (Italian: Stazione di Palese) is a railway station in the Italian district of Palese in the city of Bari, in the Province of Bari, Apulia. The station lies on the Bari–Barletta railway. The train services are operated by Ferrotramviaria.

== Train services ==
The station is served by the following service(s):

- Bari Metropolitan services (FR1) Bitonto - Palese - Bari

== See also ==
- Railway stations in Italy
- List of railway stations in Apulia
- Rail transport in Italy
- History of rail transport in Italy
