= San Pancrazio Salentino railway station =

Railway station in Italy

San Pancrazio Salentino

General information
- Location: San Pancrazio Salentino, Province of Brindisi, Apulia; Italy
- Coordinates: 40°25′16″N 17°50′12″E
- Owner: Ferrovie del Sud Est
- Operator: Ferrovie del Sud Est
- Line: Martina Franca-Lecce railway
- Platforms: 2
Location
- Location within Apulia Location within Italy

San Pancrazio Salentino is a railway station in San Pancrazio Salentino, Italy. The station is located on the Martina Franca-Lecce railway. The train services and the railway infrastructure are operated by Ferrovie del Sud Est.

== Train services ==
The station is served by the following service(s):

- Local services (Treno regionale) Martina Franca - Francavilla Fontana - Novoli - Lecce
