= Ospedale railway station =

Railway station in Italy

Ospedale

General information
- Location: Bari, Province of Bari, Apulia; Italy
- Coordinates: 41°07′03″N 16°46′50″E
- Owner: Rete Ferroviaria Italiana
- Operator: Ferrotramviaria
- Line: Bari–San Paolo railway
- Platforms: 2

History
- Opened: 22 December 2008; 17 years ago
Location
- Location within Apulia Location within Southern Italy Location within Italy

Ospedale (Italian: Stazione di Ospedale) is a railway station in the Italian city of Bari, in the Province of Bari, Apulia. The station lies on the Bari–San Paolo railway. The train services are operated by Ferrotramviaria.

== Train services ==
The station is served by the following service(s):

- Bari Metropolitan services (FM1) Ospedale - Bari

== See also ==
- Railway stations in Italy
- List of railway stations in Apulia
- Rail transport in Italy
- History of rail transport in Italy
