= Tiggiano =

- Comune
- Comune di Tiggiano
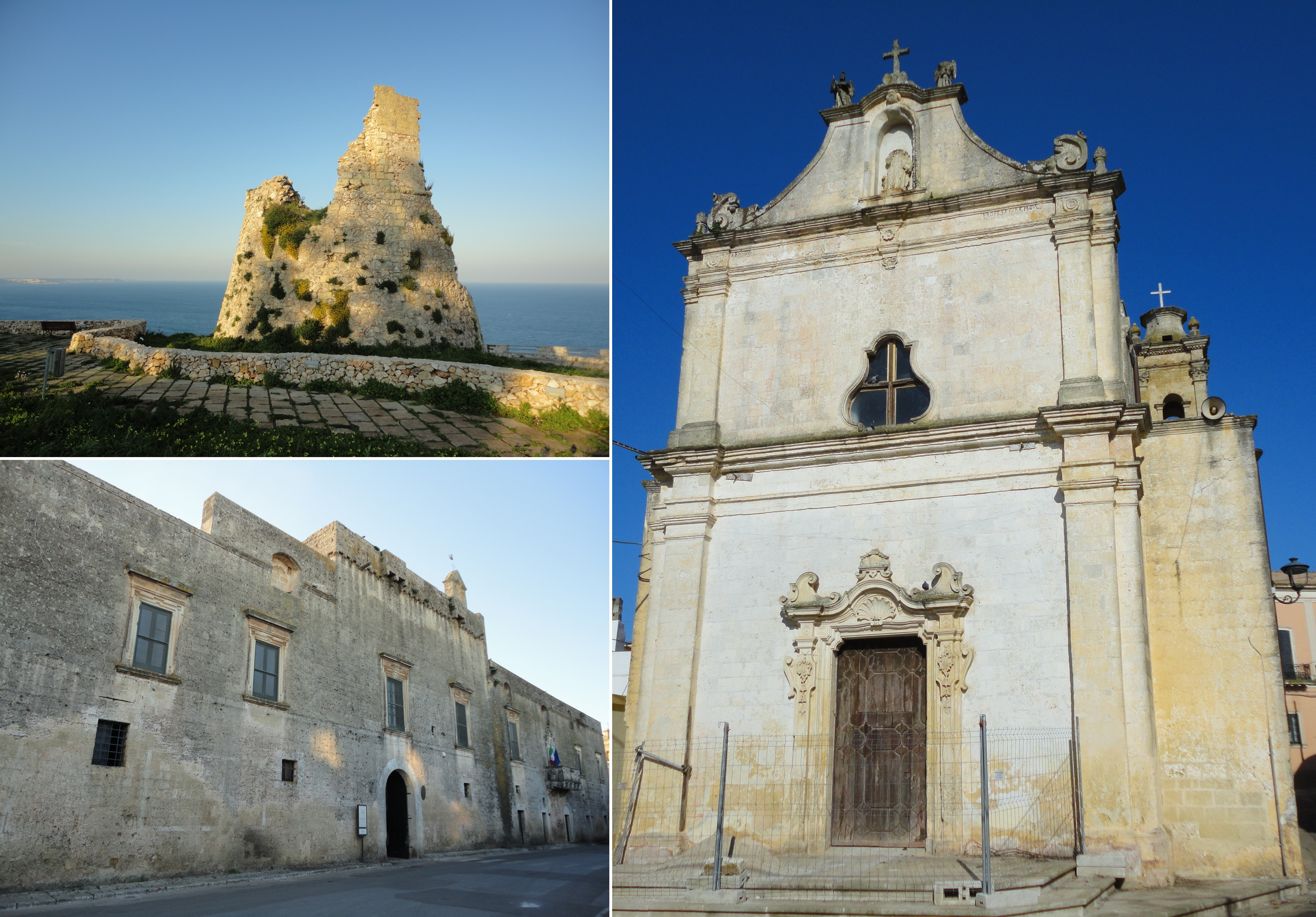
- Top left Nasparo Tower, bottom left Baronial Serafini Palace, right Saint Ippazio Cathedral

- Location within Italy Location within Apulia
- Coordinates: 39°54′N 18°22′E
- Country: Italy
- Region: Apulia
- Province: Lecce (LE)
- Frazioni: Alessano, Corsano, Tricase

Area
  - Total: 7.5 km^{2} (2.9 sq mi)
- Elevation: 128 m (420 ft)

Population (November 2009)
  - Total: 2,928
  - Density: 390/km^{2} (1,000/sq mi)
- Time zone: UTC+1 (CET)
  - Summer (DST): UTC+2 (CEST)
- Postal code: 73030
- Dialing code: 0833
- ISTAT code: 075086
- Patron saint: Sant'Ippazio
- Saint day: 19 January
- Website: Official website

Tiggiano (Salentino: Tiššànu) is a town and comune in the Italian province of Lecce in the Apulia region of south-east Italy.
