= Quintino Sella railway station =

Railway station in Bari, Italy

Quintino Sella
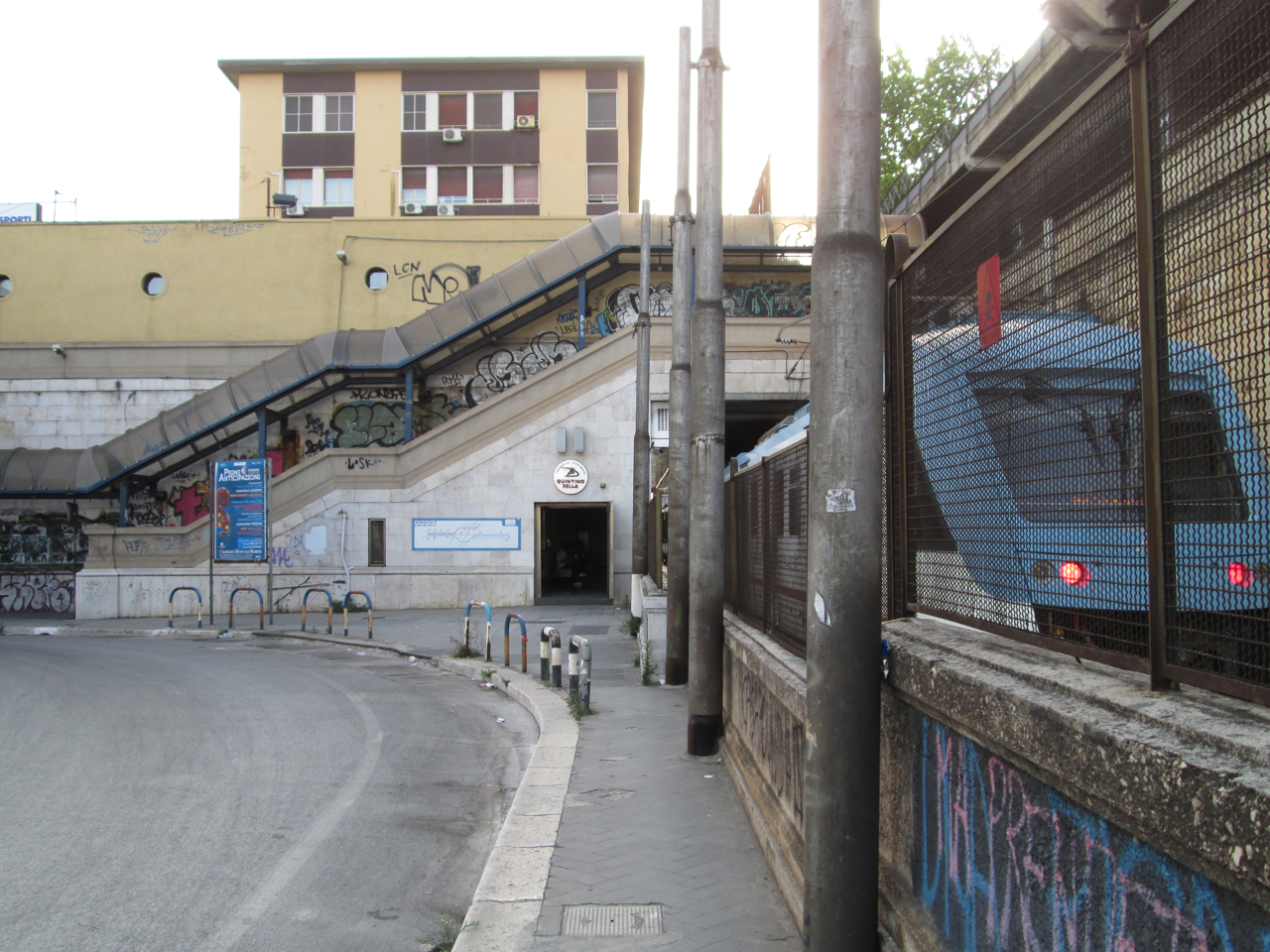
- A train arriving at Quintino Sella Station

General information
- Location: Bari; Bari, Bari, Apulia; Italy
- Coordinates: 41°07′04″N 16°51′45″E
- Operator: Rete Ferroviaria Italiana
- Line: Bari–Barletta railway (Trenitalia)
- Platforms: 1
- Train operators: Ferrotramviaria

Other information
- Classification: Bronze
Location
- Location within Apulia Location within Southern Italy Location within Italy

Quintino Sella (Italian: Stazione di Quintino Sella) is a railway station in the Italian city of Bari, in the Province of Bari, Apulia. The station lies on the Bari–Barletta railway. The train services are operated by Ferrotramviaria. The station is a one-platform station serving a single-track railway with trains going in both directions. The station is semi-subterranean with the platform opening directly to the street.

The ticket vending machine is at the far end of the underground portion of the platform away from the entrance.

== Train services ==
The station is served by the following service(s):

- Bari Metropolitan services (FR1) Bitonto - Palese - Bari
- Bari Metropolitan services (FR2) Barletta - Andria - Bitonto - Aeroporto - Bari
- Bari Metropolitan services (FM1) Ospedale - Bari
- Bari Metropolitan services (FM2) Bitonto - Aeroporto - Bari

== See also ==
- Railway stations in Italy
- List of railway stations in Apulia
- Rail transport in Italy
- History of rail transport in Italy
