= Brigata Bari railway station =

Railway station in Bari, Italy

Brigata Bari

General information
- Location: Bari; Bari, Bari, Apulia; Italy
- Coordinates: 41°07′05″N 16°51′06″E
- Operator: Rete Ferroviaria Italiana
- Line: Bari–Barletta railway (Trenitalia)
- Platforms: 1
- Train operators: Ferrotramviaria

Other information
- Classification: Bronze
Location
- Location within Apulia Location within Southern Italy Location within Italy

Brigata Bari (Italian: Stazione di Brigata Bari) is a railway station in the Italian city of Bari, in the Province of Bari, Apulia. The station lies on the Bari–Barletta railway.

The train services are operated by Ferrotramviaria.

== Train services ==
The station is served by the following service(s):

- Bari Metropolitan services (FR1) Bitonto - Palese - Bari
- Bari Metropolitan services (FR2) Barletta - Andria - Bitonto - Aeroporto - Bari
- Bari Metropolitan services (FM1) Ospedale - Bari
- Bari Metropolitan services (FM2) Bitonto - Aeroporto - Bari

== See also ==
- Railway stations in Italy
- List of railway stations in Apulia
- Rail transport in Italy
- History of rail transport in Italy
