= Ginosa railway station =

Railway station in Marina di Ginosa, Italy

Ginosa
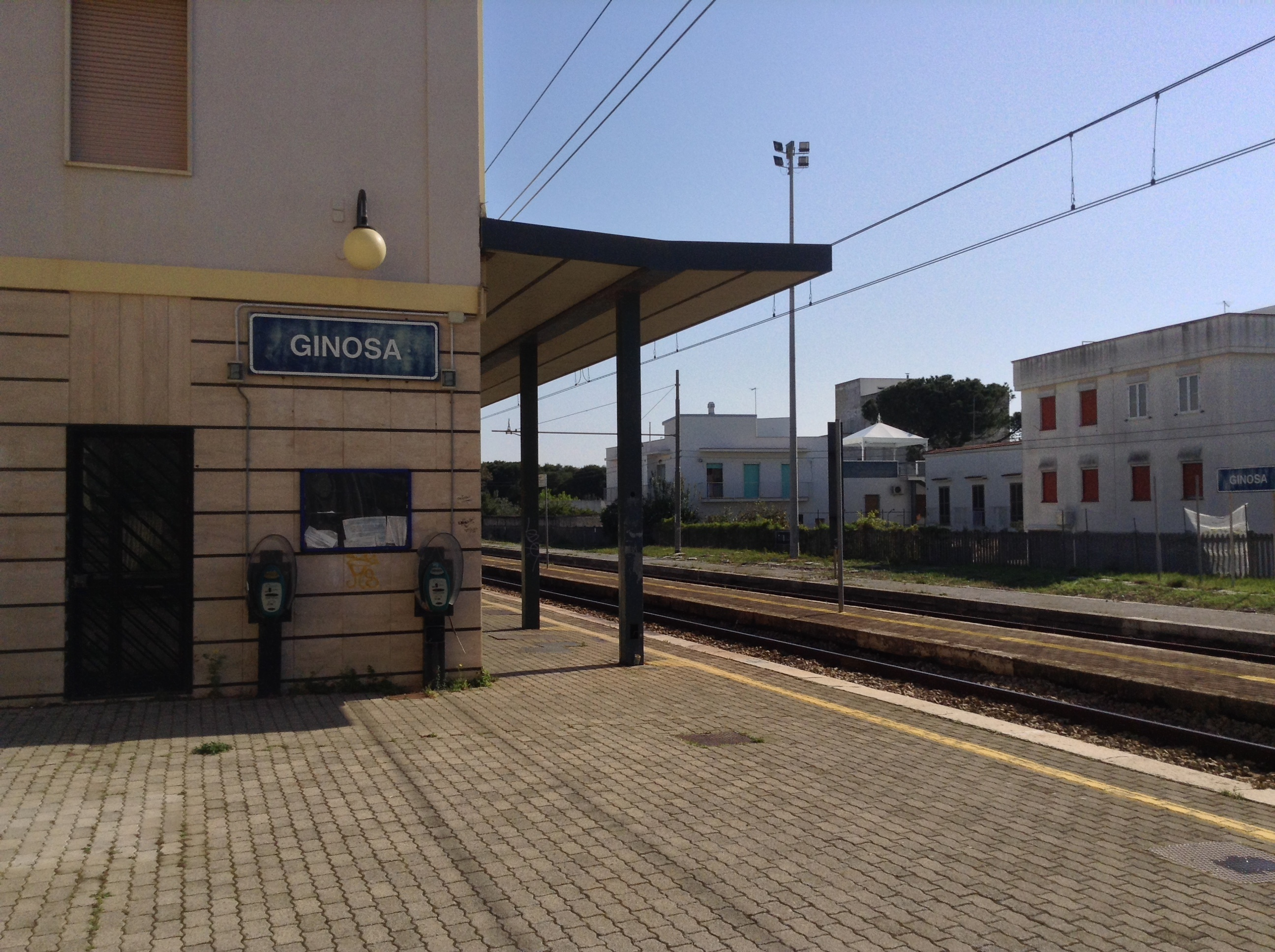
- Ginosa railway station

General information
- Location: Marina di Ginosa, Province of Taranto, Apulia; Italy
- Coordinates: 40°25′45″N 16°53′27″E
- Owner: Rete Ferroviaria Italiana
- Operator: Trenitalia
- Line: Taranto–Reggio di Calabria railway
- Platforms: 3
Location
- Location within Apulia Location within Italy

Ginosa is a railway station in Marina di Ginosa, Italy. The station is located on the Taranto–Reggio di Calabria railway. The train services are operated by Trenitalia.

== Train services ==
The station is served by the following service(s):

- Regional services (Treno regionale) Naples - Salerno - Potenza - Metaponto - Taranto
