= Salice–Veglie railway station =

Railway station in Italy

Salice–Veglie

General information
- Location: Salice Salentino, Province of Lecce, Apulia; Italy
- Coordinates: 40°23′23″N 17°57′57″E
- Owner: Ferrovie del Sud Est
- Operator: Ferrovie del Sud Est
- Line: Martina Franca–Lecce railway
- Platforms: 2
Location
- Location within Apulia Location within Southern Italy Location within Italy

Salice–Veglie is a railway station in Salice Salentino, Italy. The station is located on the Martina Franca–Lecce railway. The train services and the railway infrastructure are operated by Ferrovie del Sud Est.

== Train services ==
The station is served by:

- Local services (Treno regionale) Martina Franca - Francavilla Fontana - Novoli - Lecce
