= Cannole =

Cannole Griko: Cannula
- Comune
- Comune di Cannole
- Location within Italy Location within Apulia
- Coordinates: 40°09′58″N 18°21′55″E
- Country: Italy
- Region: Apulia
- Province: Lecce (LE)

Area
  - Total: 20 km^{2} (7.7 sq mi)
- Elevation: 105 m (344 ft)

Population (November 2008)
  - Total: 1,802
  - Density: 90/km^{2} (230/sq mi)
- Demonym: Cannolesi
- Time zone: UTC+1 (CET)
  - Summer (DST): UTC+2 (CEST)
- Postal code: 73020
- Dialing code: 0836
- ISTAT code: 075012
- Patron saint: San Vincenzo Ferreri
- Saint day: 5 April
- Website: Official website

Cannole (Salentino: Cànnole or Cànnule; Griko: Κάννουλα translit. Cànnula) is a town and comune in the Italian province of Lecce in the Apulia region of south-east Italy, in what could be the "tip" of the "heel" of Italy. It is 29 kilometres (18 mi) south-east of Lecce.

The inhabitants of Cannole, alongside Italian, also speak Griko, a Greek dialect. The language, folklore, traditions and history of Cannole, like those of the eight other cities in the area called "Salentine Greece", reveal significant Greek influences over the course of time, presumably from the time of the Byzantine control, or even the ancient Magna Graecia colonisation in the 8th century BCE.

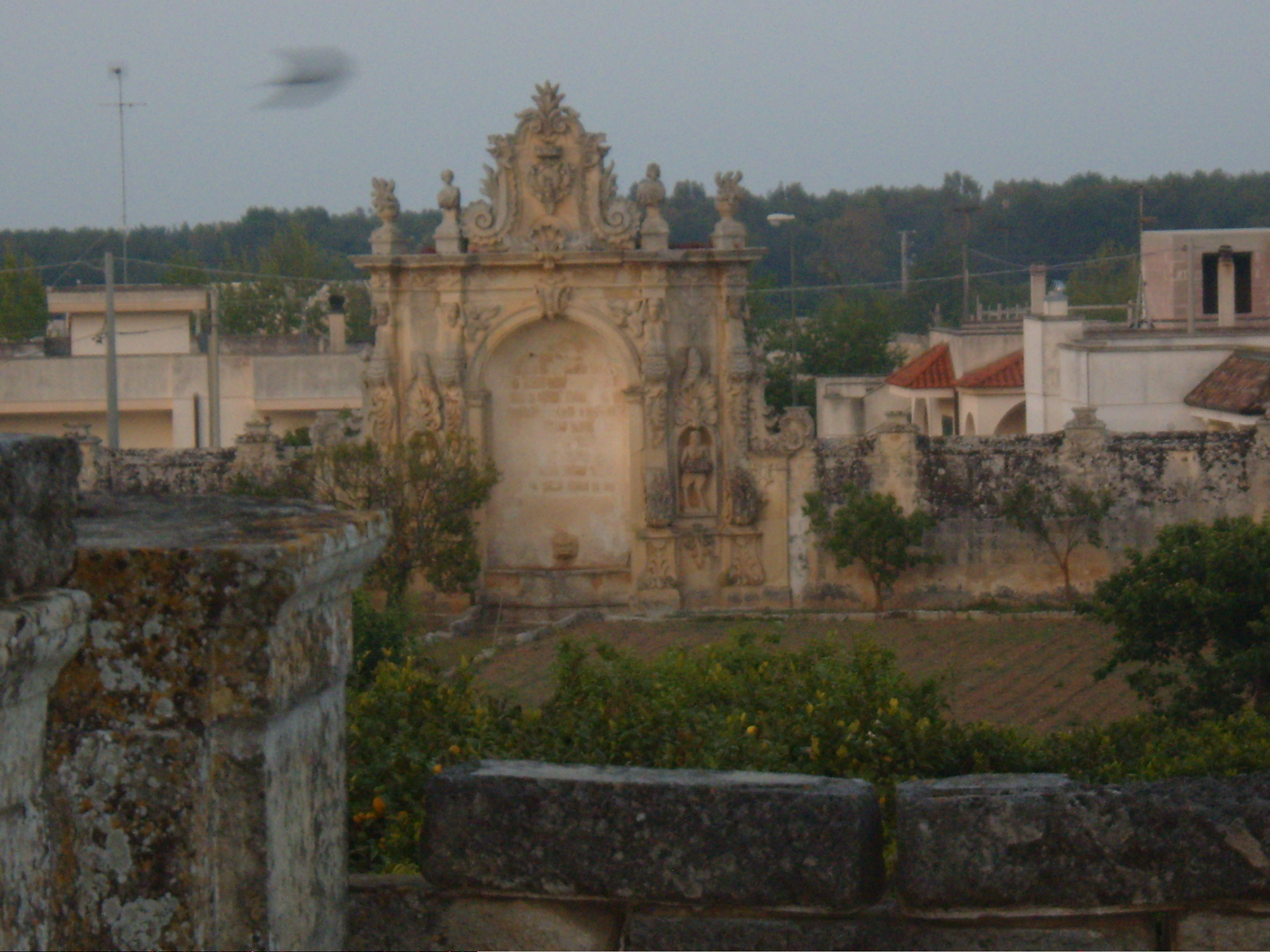
Fountain in the garden of the castle

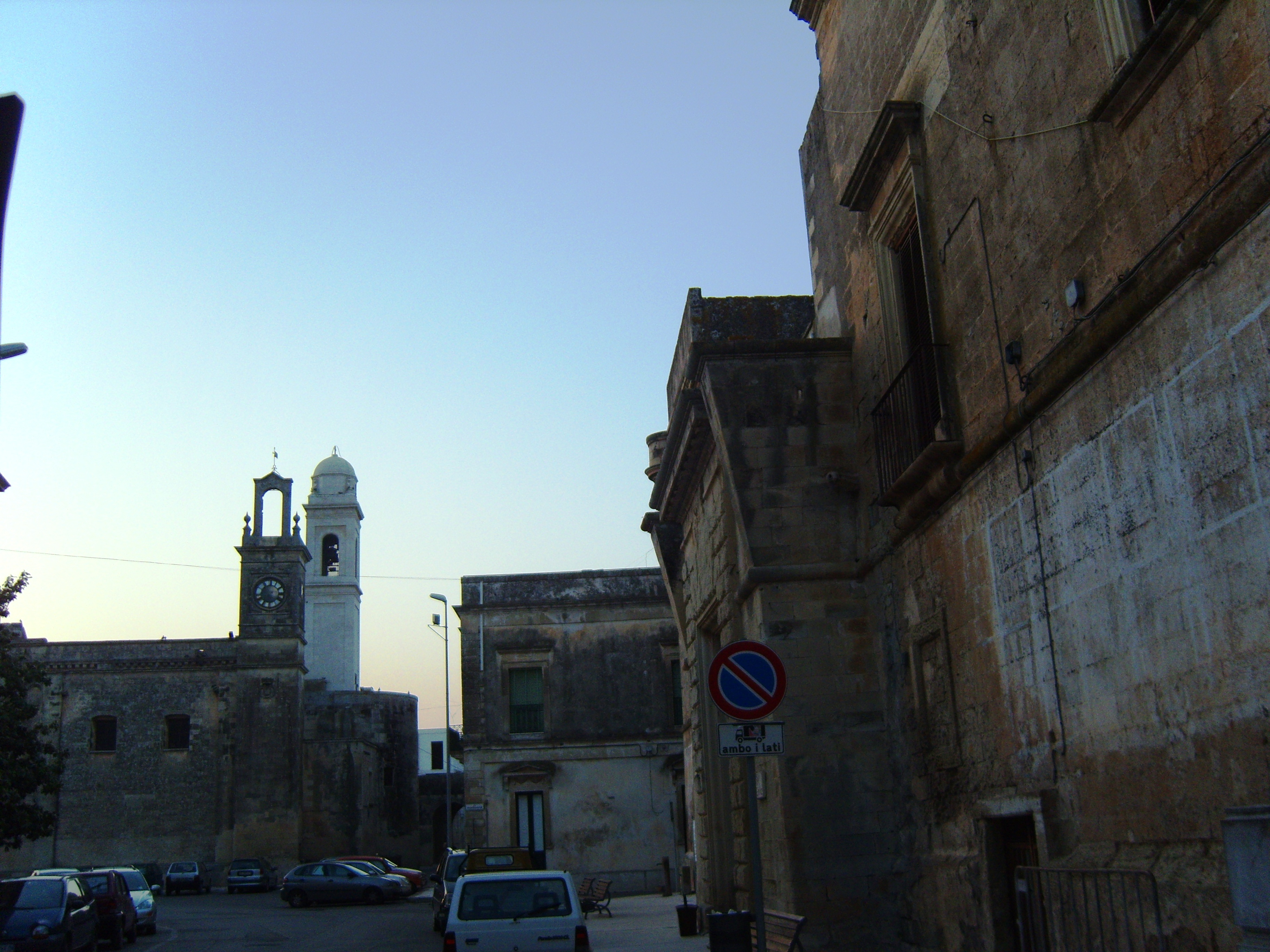
Square
