= Giurdignano =

- Comune
- Comune di Giurdignano
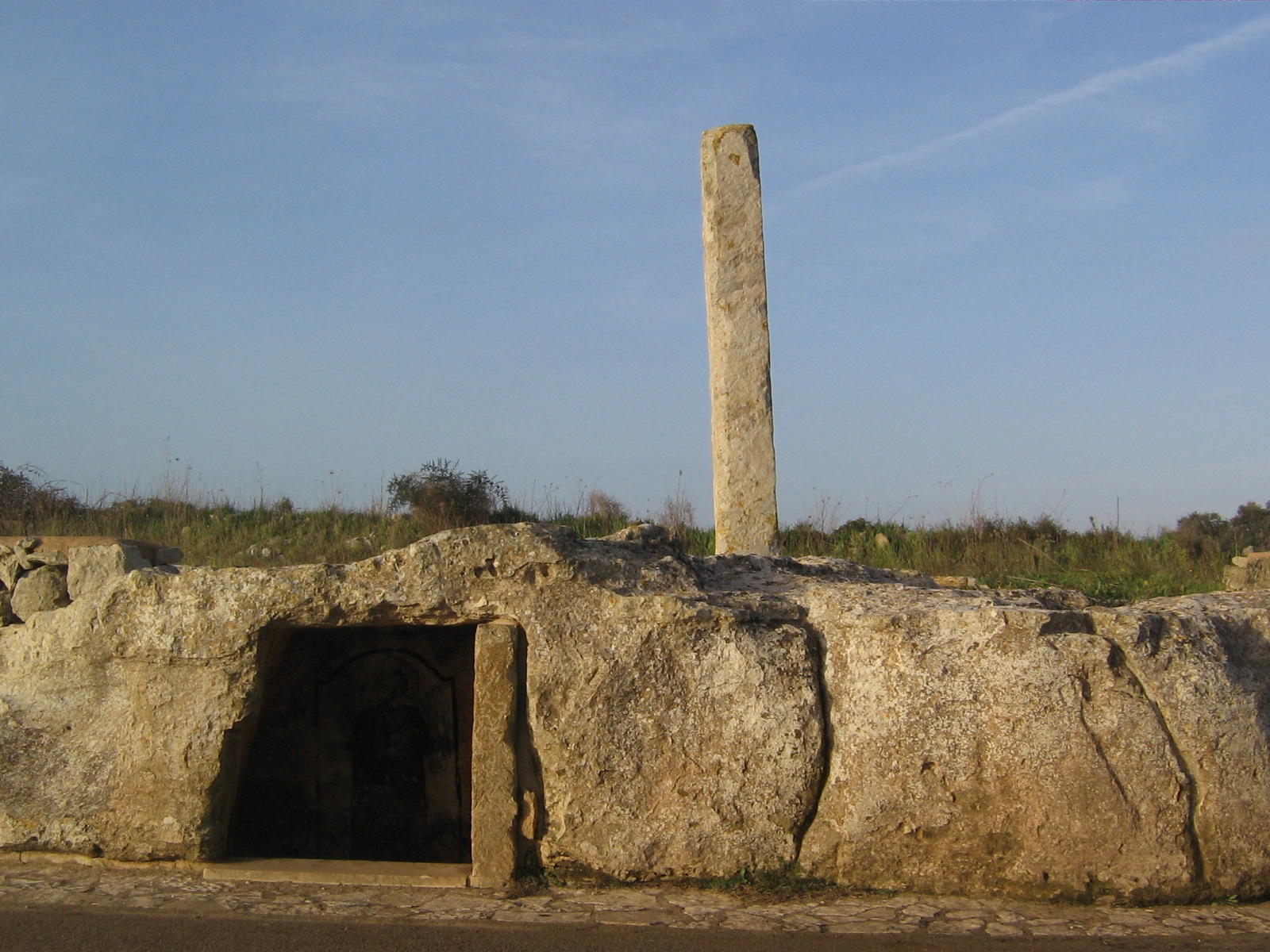
- San Paolo standing stone

- Coat of arms

- Location of Giurdignano in Italy Giurdignano (Apulia)
- Coordinates: 40°07′N 18°25′E
- Country: Italy
- Region: Apulia
- Province: Lecce (LE)

Government
  - Mayor: Monica Laura Gravante

Area
  - Total: 4.04 km^{2} (1.56 sq mi)
- Elevation: 78 m (256 ft)

Population (31 August 2017)
  - Total: 1,941
  - Density: 480/km^{2} (1,240/sq mi)
- Demonym: Giurdignanesi
- Time zone: UTC+1 (CET)
  - Summer (DST): UTC+2 (CEST)
- Postal code: 73020
- Dialing code: 0836
- ISTAT code: 075033
- Patron saint: St. Roch
- Saint day: August 17
- Website: Official website

Giurdignano is a town and comune in the province of Lecce in the Apulia region of south-east Italy.

== History ==
The human presence in the area of Giurdignano dates to as early as the Bronze Age, as testified by the presence of numerous menhirs and dolmens. Later it was conquered by the Romans (archaeological findings include a 2nd-3rd century AD necropolis).

Later it was part of the Byzantine Empire until the Normans conquered it in the 11th century.

== Main sights ==
The territory of Giurdignano is characterized by the greatest presence of menhir and dolmen in Italy, the total exceeding 25.

Other sights include the 18th century Mothern Church, the crypt of San Salvatore (8th-10th centuries, an example of Byzantine rock-carved chapel), the remains of the Abbey of Centoporte, and the 16th century baronial Palace.
