= Bitonto Santi Medici railway station =

Railway station in Italy

Bitonto Santi Medici

General information
- Location: Bitonto, Province of Bari, Apulia; Italy
- Coordinates: 41°07′02″N 16°41′53″E
- Owner: Rete Ferroviaria Italiana
- Operator: Ferrotramviaria
- Line: Bari–Barletta railway
- Platforms: 2
Location
- Location within Apulia Location within Southern Italy Location within Italy

Bitonto SS Medici is a railway station in Bitonto, Italy. The train services are operated by Ferrotramviaria.

== Train services ==
The station is served by the following service(s):

- Bari Metropolitan services (FR1) Bitonto - Palese - Bari
- Bari Metropolitan services (FR2) Barletta - Andria - Bitonto - Aeroporto - Bari
- Bari Metropolitan services (FM2) Bitonto - Aeroporto - Bari
