= Sanarica =

Sanarica Asinarìca (Greek)
- Comune
- Comune di Sanarica
- Location within Italy Location within Apulia
- Coordinates: 40°5′N 18°21′E
- Country: Italy
- Region: Apulia
- Province: Lecce (LE)
- Frazioni: Botrugno, Giuggianello, Muro Leccese, Poggiardo, San Cassiano, Scorrano

Area
  - Total: 12 km^{2} (4.6 sq mi)
- Elevation: 78 m (256 ft)

Population (30 November 2008)
  - Total: 1,484
  - Density: 120/km^{2} (320/sq mi)
- Demonym: Sanarichesi
- Time zone: UTC+1 (CET)
  - Summer (DST): UTC+2 (CEST)
- Postal code: 73030
- Dialing code: 0836
- ISTAT code: 075067
- Patron saint: Madonna delle Grazie
- Saint day: 8 September
- Website: Official website

Sanarica is a town and comune in the Italian province of Lecce in the Apulia region of south-east Italy.
