= San Donato di Lecce =

San Donato di Lecce Griko: Addunào
- Comune
- Comune di San Donato di Lecce
- Location within Italy Location within Apulia
- Coordinates: 40°16′N 18°11′E
- Country: Italy
- Region: Apulia
- Province: Lecce (LE)
- Frazioni: Galugnano

Government
  - Mayor: Alessandro Quarta

Area
  - Total: 21 km^{2} (8.1 sq mi)
- Elevation: 70 m (230 ft)

Population (November 2008)
  - Total: 5,863
  - Density: 280/km^{2} (720/sq mi)
- Time zone: UTC+1 (CET)
  - Summer (DST): UTC+2 (CEST)
- Postal code: 73010
- Dialing code: 0832
- ISTAT code: 075069
- Patron saint: San Donato
- Saint day: 7 August
- Website: Official website

San Donato di Lecce is a town and comune of 5,837 inhabitants in the Italian province of Lecce in the Apulia region of south-east Italy. It includes the frazione of Galugnano.
