= Trepuzzi =

- Comune
- Comune di Trepuzzi
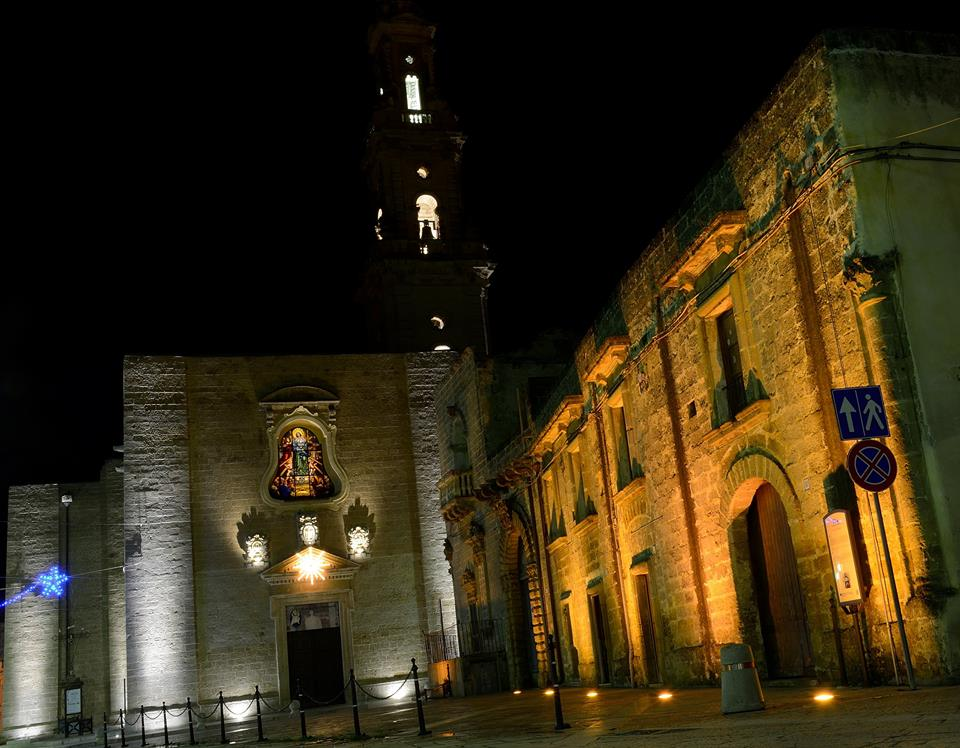
- Church of Santa Maria Assunta.

- Location within Italy Location within Apulia
- Coordinates: 40°24′N 18°4′E
- Country: Italy
- Region: Apulia
- Province: Lecce (LE)

Government
  - Mayor: Giuseppe Taurino

Area
  - Total: 23.43 km^{2} (9.05 sq mi)
- Elevation: 55 m (180 ft)

Population (31 December 2014)
  - Total: 14,757
  - Density: 629.8/km^{2} (1,631/sq mi)
- Demonym: Trepuzzini
- Time zone: UTC+1 (CET)
  - Summer (DST): UTC+2 (CEST)
- Postal code: 73019
- Dialing code: 0832
- Patron saint: Assumption of Mary
- Saint day: 15 August
- Website: Official website

Trepuzzi (Salentino: Trepuzze) is a town and comune in the province of Lecce in the Apulia region of south-east Italy.
