= Spongano =

- Comune
- Comune di Spongano
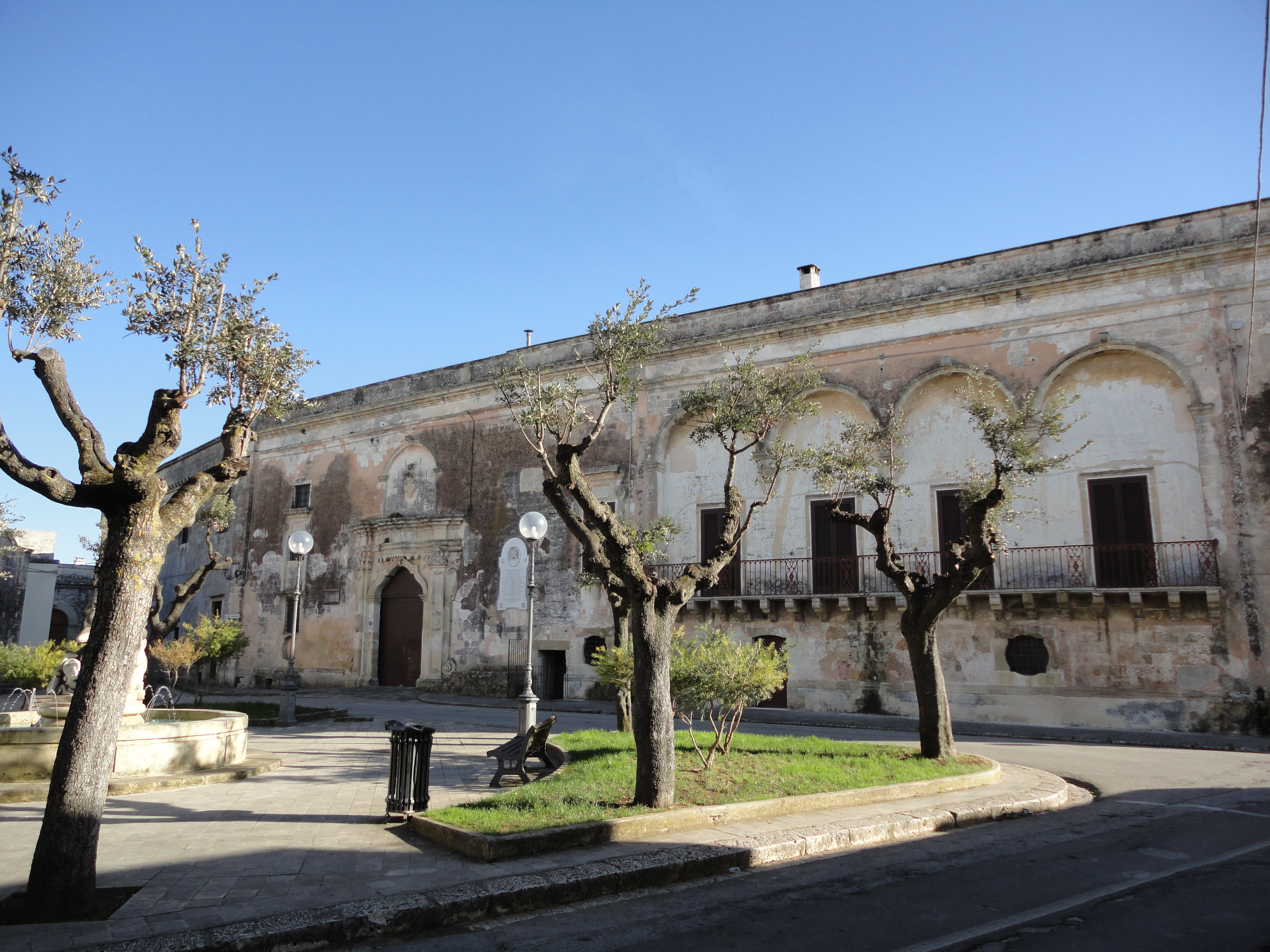
- The castle

- Coat of arms

- Location within Italy Location within Apulia
- Coordinates: 40°1′N 18°22′E
- Country: Italy
- Region: Apulia
- Province: Lecce (LE)

Government
  - Mayor: Luigi Rizzello

Area
  - Total: 12.42 km^{2} (4.80 sq mi)
- Elevation: 96 m (315 ft)

Population (30 November 2011)
  - Total: 3,813
  - Density: 307.0/km^{2} (795.1/sq mi)
- Demonym: Sponganesi
- Time zone: UTC+1 (CET)
  - Summer (DST): UTC+2 (CEST)
- Postal code: 73038
- Dialing code: 0836
- Patron saint: St. Victoria
- Saint day: 23 December
- Website: Official website

Spongano (Salentino: Spugnànu) is a town and comune in the province of Lecce, in the Apulia region of south-east Italy. It is located among the olive groves of Puglia's Salento, and retains its rural character while being just a few minutes to the Adriatic Sea. The rocky shore provides hidden coves interrupted by sandy beaches and reefs. The town bears witness to humanity's prehistoric presence with the dolmen called Piedi Grandi along with other megaliths and mehir.

== Main sights ==
- Church of San Giorgio (1771)
- Chapel of Immacolata (1636)
- Chapel of Madonna del Rosario (1628)
- Palazzo Bacile di Castiglione (16th century), which includes the former mediaeval rocca (Castle)
