= Bari Aeroporto railway station =

Railway station in Bari, Italy

Bari Aeroporto
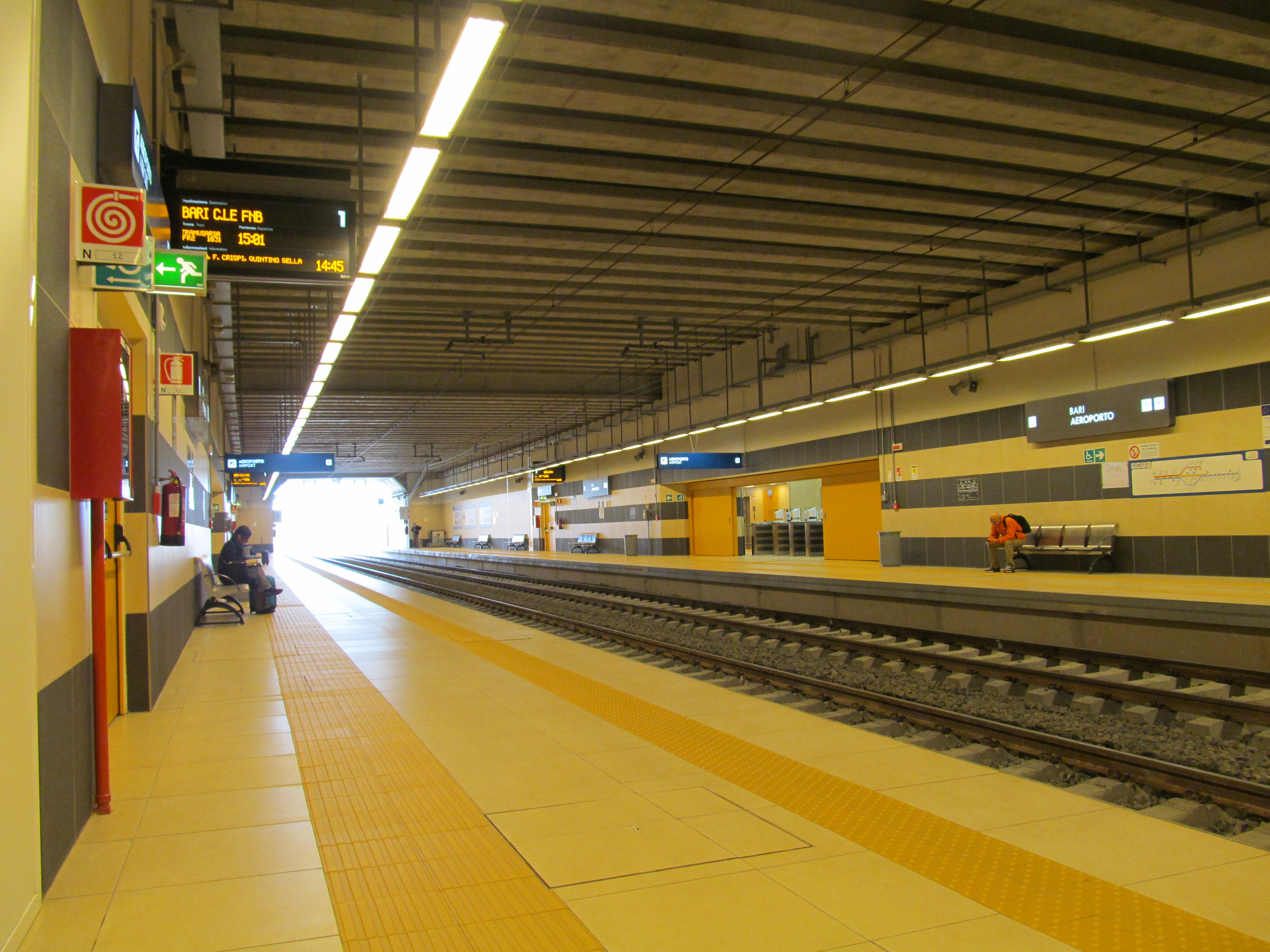
- Bari Aeroporto railway station

General information
- Location: Bari Karol Wojtyła Airport; Palese, Bari; Bari, Bari, Apulia; Italy
- Coordinates: 41°07′58″N 16°45′59″E
- Owner: Rete Ferroviaria Italiana
- Line: Bari–Bitonto railway
- Platforms: 2
- Train operators: Ferrotramviaria
- Connections: Bari Karol Wojtyła Airport

Other information
- Classification: Bronze

History
- Opened: 20 July 2013; 13 years ago
Location
- Location within Apulia Location within Southern Italy Location within Italy

Aeroporto is a railway station in Bari, Italy, which serves Bari Karol Wojtyła Airport. The two platforms are connected to the terminal by an underground walkway. The station opened on 20 July 2013 and the train services are operated by Ferrotramviaria.

== Train services ==
The station is served by the following service(s):

- Bari Metropolitan services (FR2) Barletta - Andria - Bitonto - Aeroporto - Bari
- Bari Metropolitan services (FM2) Bitonto - Aeroporto - Bari
