= Corsano =

- Comune
- Comune di Corsano
- Location within Italy Location within Apulia
- Coordinates: 39°53′N 18°22′E
- Country: Italy
- Region: Apulia
- Province: Lecce (LE)

Government
  - Mayor: Biagio Raona (since 2019)

Area
  - Total: 9 km^{2} (3.5 sq mi)
- Elevation: 121 m (397 ft)

Population (2024)
  - Total: 5,108
  - Density: 570/km^{2} (1,500/sq mi)
- Demonym: Corsanesi
- Time zone: UTC+1 (CET)
  - Summer (DST): UTC+2 (CEST)
- Postal code: 73033
- Dialing code: 0833
- ISTAT code: 075024
- Patron saint: St. Blaise
- Website: www.comune.corsano.le.it

Corsano is a town and comune in the province of Lecce in the Apulia region of south-east Italy.

== Geography ==
It is located on the last slopes of the Salentine Murge, facing the Adriatic Sea coast. The distance from Lecce is 60 kilometres (37 mi).

== History ==
Corsano was most likely founded in the 10th century, during the Byzantine domination of southern Italy, by Basilian monks. Later it was part of the Principality of Taranto, a semi-independent entity of the Kingdom of Naples, and later was held by numerous feudal families.

The most striking sight is the baronial Castle (17th century) and Julien's face.

== Twin towns and sister cities ==
Romans-sur-Isère, France
