= Bagnolo del Salento =

- Comune
- Comune di Bagnolo del Salento
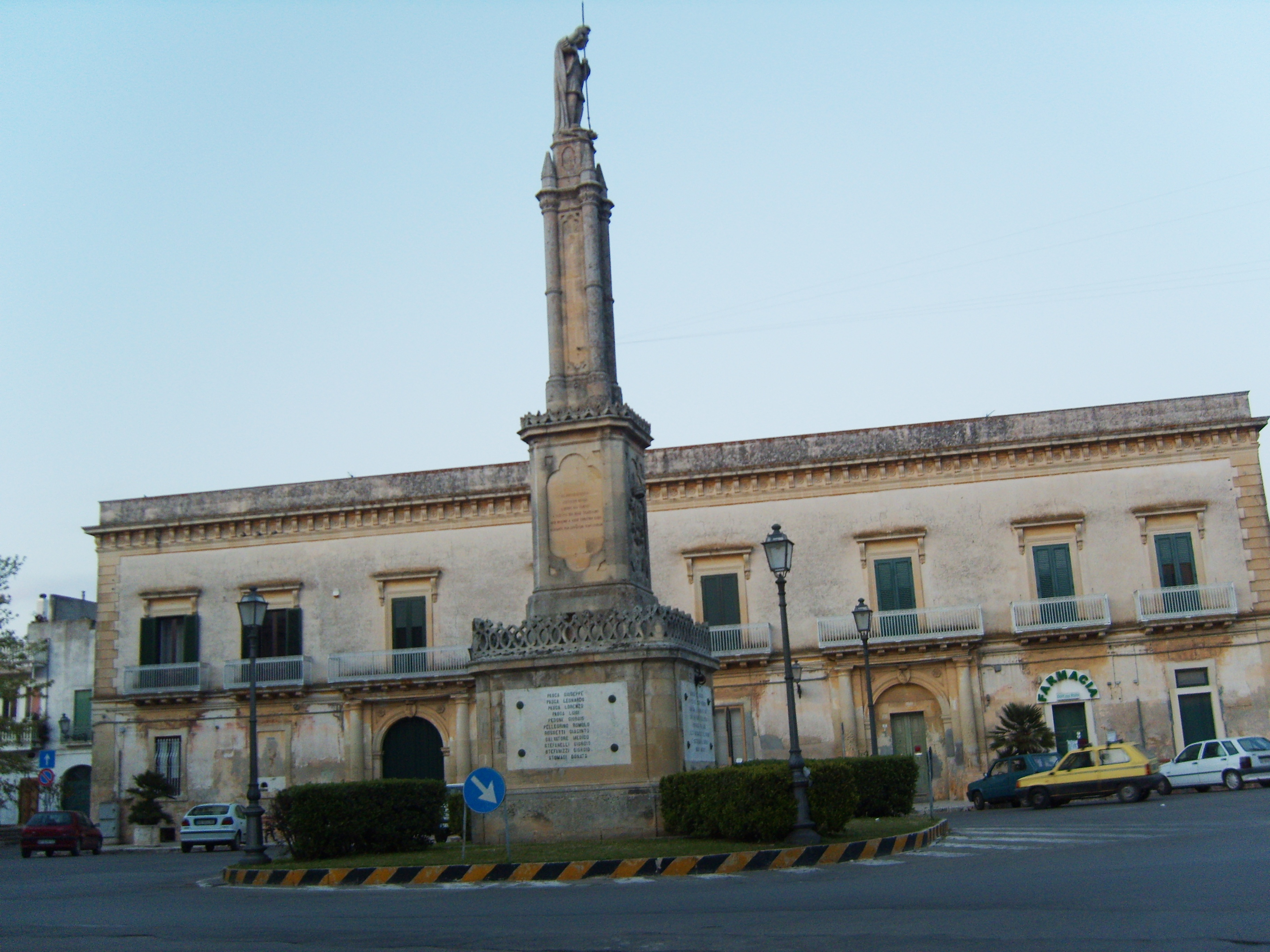

- Coat of arms

- Location within Italy Location within Apulia
- Coordinates: 40°9′N 18°21′E
- Country: Italy
- Region: Apulia
- Province: Lecce (LE)

Government
  - Mayor: Sonia Mariano

Area
  - Total: 6.74 km^{2} (2.60 sq mi)
- Elevation: 100 m (330 ft)

Population (30 April 2017)
  - Total: 1,814
  - Density: 269/km^{2} (697/sq mi)
- Demonym: Bagnolesi
- Time zone: UTC+1 (CET)
  - Summer (DST): UTC+2 (CEST)
- Postal code: 73020
- Dialing code: 0836
- ISTAT code: 075008
- Patron saint: Saint George
- Saint day: 23 April
- Website: Official website

Bagnolo del Salento (Salentino: Bagnùlu) is a town and comune in the province of Lecce in the Apulia region of south-east Italy.

In the 1946 Italian institutional referendum, Bagnolo del Salento was the comune with the strongest result for the retention of monarchy - 841 (99.41%) votes were cast for monarchy and only 5 for republic.
