= Bari–Casamassima–Putignano railway =

Railway line in Italy

Coordinates: 40°51′23.4″N 17°7′24.3″E

Bari-Casamassima-Putignano railway
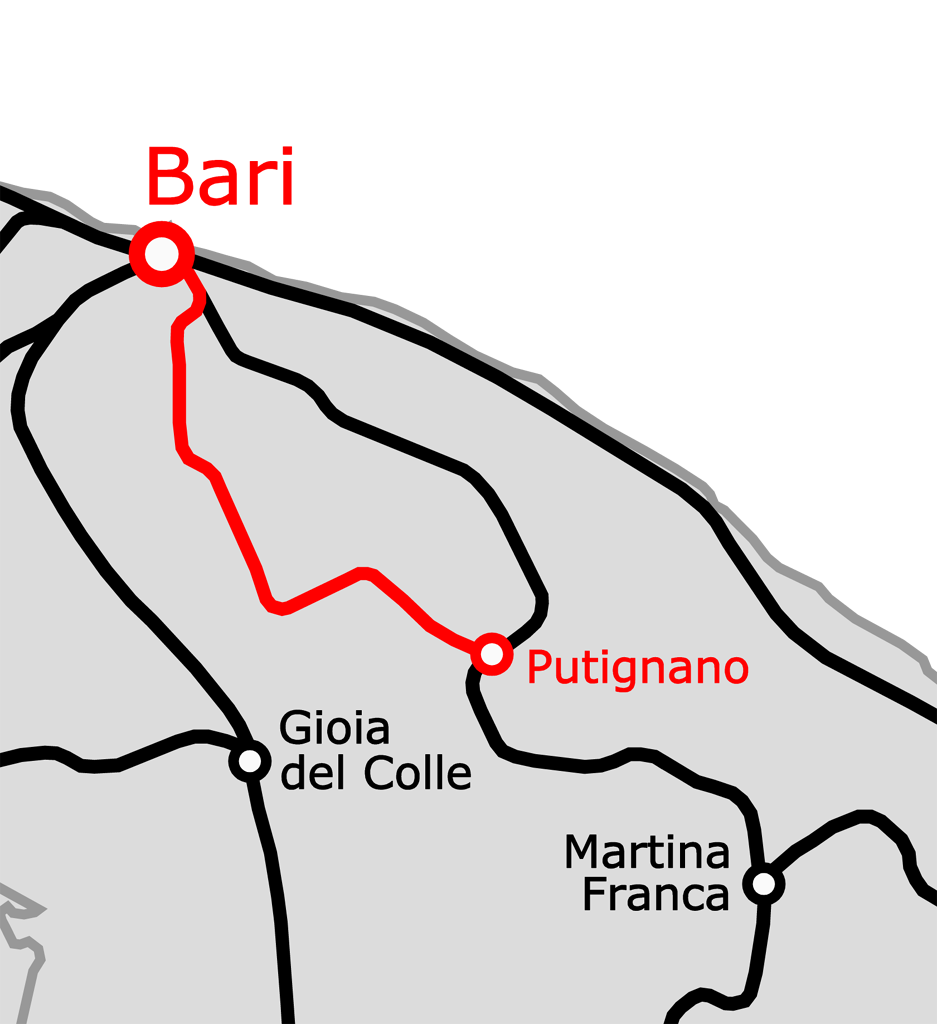

Overview
- Status: in use
- Owner: RFI
- Locale: Italy
- Termini: Bari Mungivacca; Putignano

Service
- Type: Heavy rail
- Operator(s): Ferrovie del Sud Est

History
- Opened: 1905

Technical
- Line length: 43 km (27 mi)
- Number of tracks: 1
- Track gauge: 1,435 mm (4 ft 8 1/2 in) standard gauge
- Electrification: Electrified at 3000 V DC

The Bari-Casamassima-Putignano railway is a 43-kilometre (27 mi) long Italian railway line, that connects Bari with Putignano via Casamassima.

The line was opened on 6 September 1905.

== Usage ==
The line is used by the following service(s):

- Local services (Treno regionale) Bari - Casamassima - Putignano

== Electrification ==
The railway is being electrified, largely with funds from the European Union, with most works completed in 2014. The FSE has requested a tender for four trains.

== See also ==
- List of railway lines in Italy
