= Maglie–Gagliano del Capo railway =

Railway line in Italy

Maglie-Gagliano del Capo railway

Overview
- Status: in use
- Owner: RFI
- Locale: Italy
- Termini: Maglie railway station; Gagliano Leuca railway station

Service
- Type: Heavy rail
- Operator(s): Ferrovie del Sud Est

History
- Opened: 1910

Technical
- Line length: 37 km (23 mi)
- Number of tracks: Single track
- Track gauge: 1,435 mm (4 ft 8 1/2 in) standard gauge

The Maglie–Gagliano del Capo railway is a 37-kilometre (23-mile) long railway line that connects Lecce with Zollino, Maglie and Gagliano del Capo in the region of Apulia, Italy.

== History ==
The line was opened in 1910.

== Usage ==
The line is used by the following service(s):

- Local services (Treno regionale) Zollino - Maglie - Tricase - Gagliano

== See also ==
- List of railway lines in Italy
