= Alberobello railway station =

Railway station in Alberobello, Italy

Alberobello
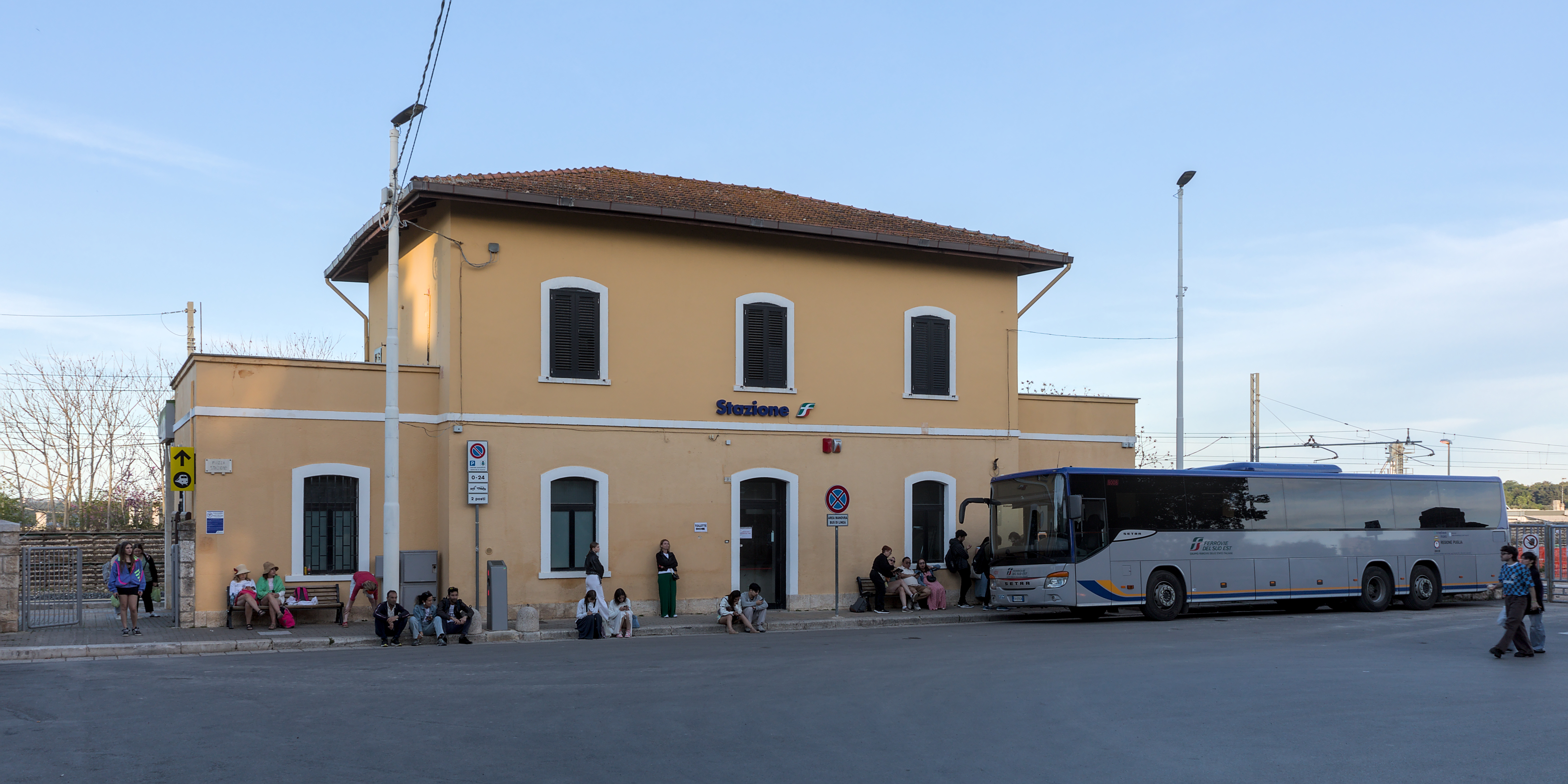
- The station building in 2025

General information
- Location: Alberobello, Bari, Apulia; Italy
- Coordinates: 40°47′12″N 17°14′32″E
- Owner: Ferrovie del Sud Est
- Line: Bari–Martina Franca–Taranto railway
- Platforms: 2
- Train operators: Ferrovie del Sud Est

Services
Preceding station	Ferrovie del Sud Est	Following station
Noci towards Putignano	Regionale; Putignano–Martina Franca	Locorotondo towards Martina Franca
Location
- Location within Apulia Location within Italy

Alberobello railway station (Italian: Stazione di Alberobello) is a railway station in Alberobello, Italy. The station is located on the Bari–Martina Franca–Taranto railway. The train services and the railway infrastructure are operated by Ferrovie del Sud Est.

== Services ==
As of the June 2025 timetable change, the following services stop at Alberobello:

- Regionale: local service between Bari Centrale and Martina Franca.
