= Noci railway station =

Railway station in Italy

Noci

General information
- Location: Noci, Bari, Apulia; Italy
- Coordinates: 40°47′44″N 17°07′41″E
- Owner: Ferrovie del Sud Est
- Line: Bari–Martina Franca–Taranto railway
- Platforms: 2
- Train operators: Ferrovie del Sud Est

Services
Preceding station	Ferrovie del Sud Est	Following station
Putignano Monte Laureto towards Putignano	Regionale; Putignano–Martina Franca	Alberobello towards Martina Franca
Location
- Location within Apulia Location within Southern Italy Location within Italy

Noci railway station (Italian: Stazione di Noci) is a railway station in Noci, Italy. The station is located on the Bari–Martina Franca–Taranto railway. The train services and the railway infrastructure are operated by Ferrovie del Sud Est.

== Services ==
As of the June 2025 timetable change, the following services stop at Locorotondo:

- Regionale: local service between Bari Centrale and Martina Franca.
