= Bari Sud Est railway station =

Railway station in Bari, Italy

Bari Sud Est
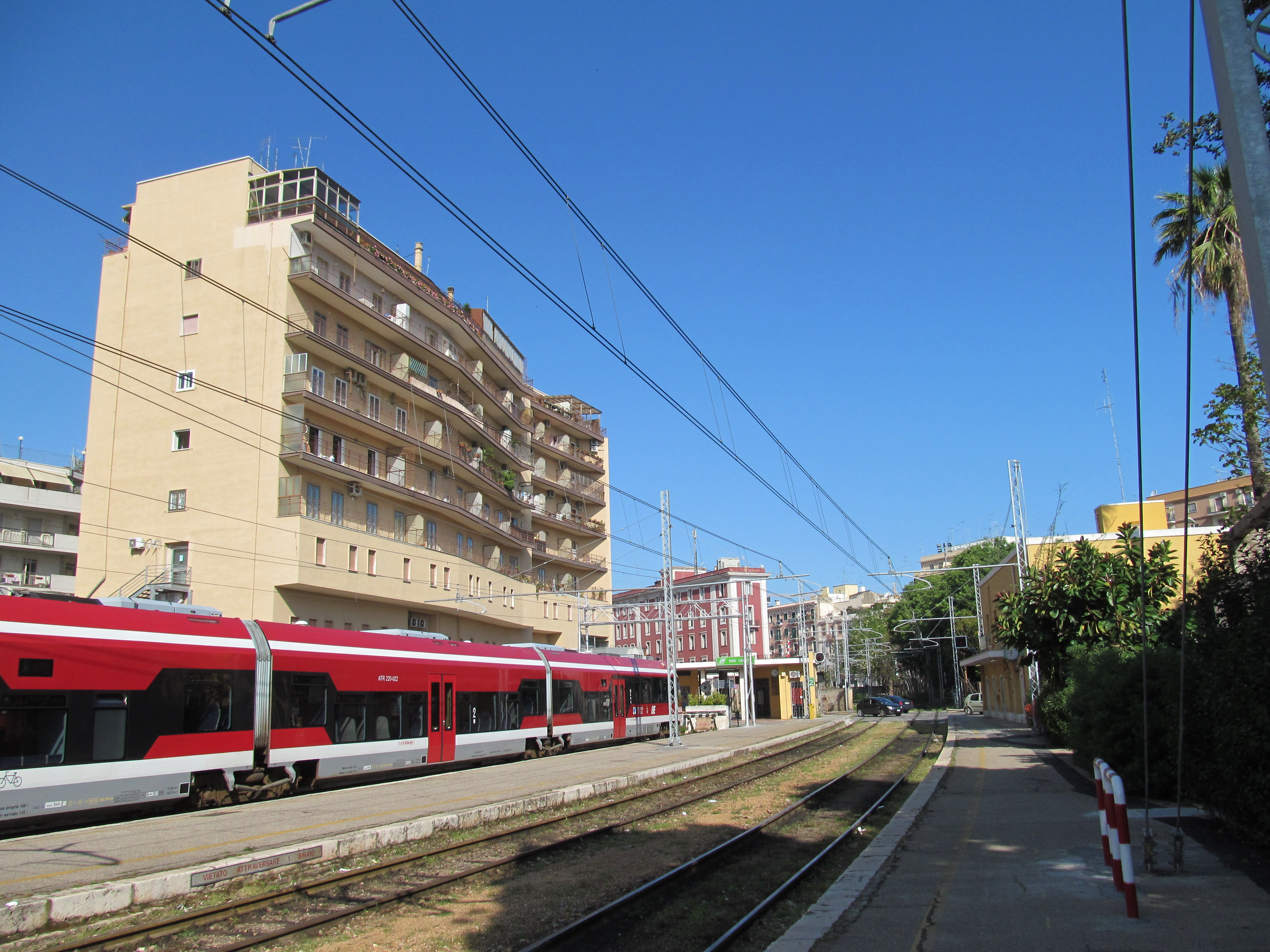
- Bari Sud Est railway station

General information
- Location: Bari; Bari, Bari, Apulia; Italy
- Coordinates: 41°07′02″N 16°52′47″E
- Owner: Ferrovie del Sud Est
- Line: Bari–Martina Franca–Taranto railway
- Platforms: 2
- Train operators: Ferrovie del Sud Est

Services
Preceding station	Ferrovie del Sud Est	Following station
Bari Centrale Terminus	Regionale; Bari–Putignano	Mungivacca towards Putignano
Location
- Location within Apulia Location within Southern Italy Location within Italy

Bari Sud Est railway station (Italian: Stazione di Bari Sud Est) is a railway station in Bari, Italy. It is located on the Bari–Martina Franca–Taranto railway. The train services and the railway infrastructure are operated by Ferrovie del Sud Est.

== Services ==
As of the June 2025 timetable change, the following services stop at Bari Sud Est:

- Regionale: local service between Bari Centrale and Martina Franca.
