= Mungivacca railway station =

Railway station in Bari, Italy

Mungivacca
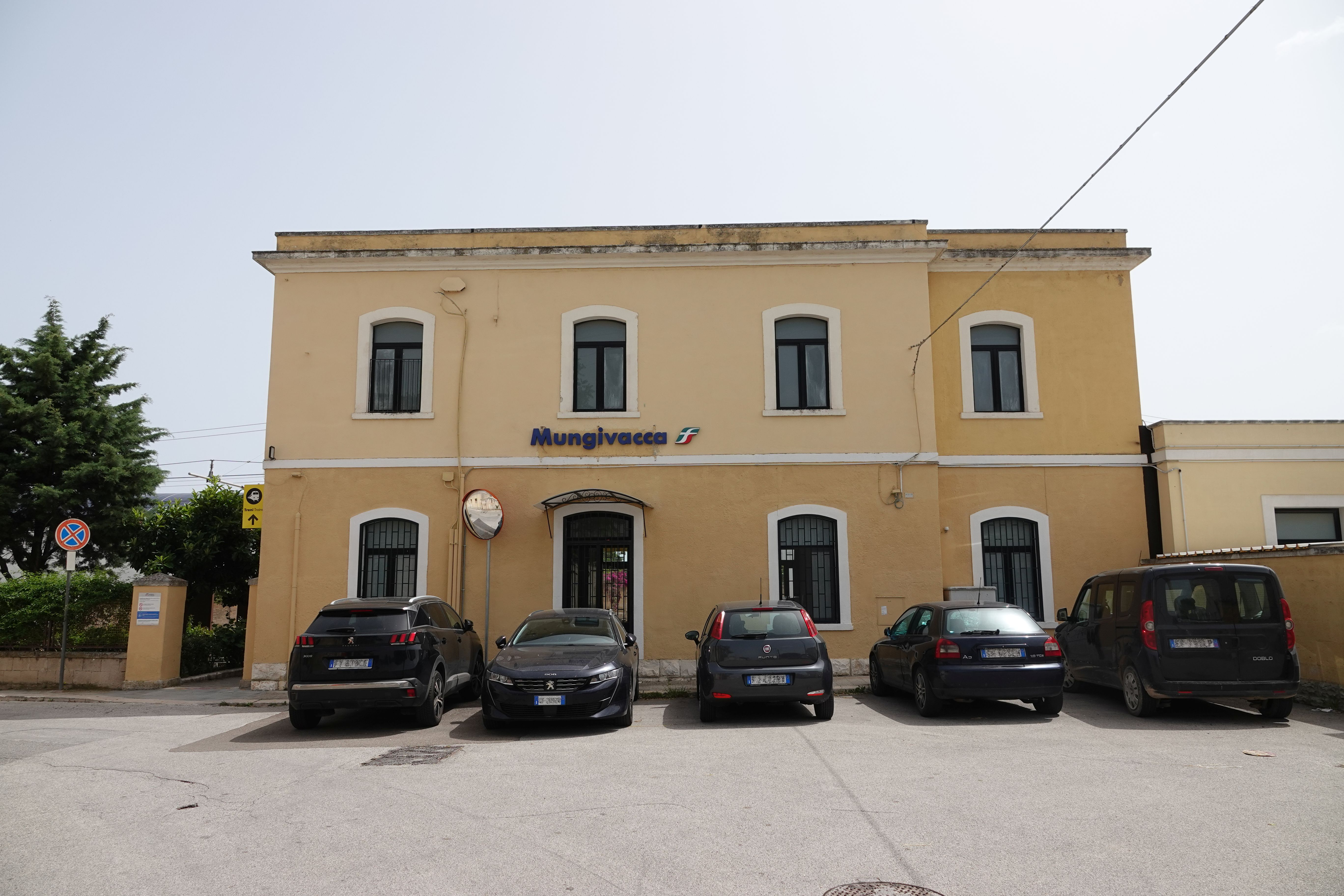
- The station building in 2024

General information
- Location: Bari; Bari, Bari, Apulia; Italy
- Coordinates: 41°05′24″N 16°54′01″E
- Owner: Ferrovie del Sud Est
- Lines: Bari–Martina Franca–Taranto railway Bari-Casamassima-Putignano railway
- Platforms: 4
- Train operators: Ferrovie del Sud Est

Services
Preceding station	Ferrovie del Sud Est	Following station
Bari Sud Est towards Bari Centrale	Regionale; Bari–Putignano	Bari Ceglie-Carbonara towards Putignano
Location
- Location within Apulia Location within Southern Italy Location within Italy

Mungivacca railway station (Italian: Stazione di Mungivacca) is a railway station in Bari, Italy. The station is located on the Bari–Martina Franca–Taranto railway and Bari-Casamassima-Putignano railway. The train services and the railway infrastructure are operated by Ferrovie del Sud Est.

The station is located next to the IKEA in Bari.

== Services ==
As of the June 2025 timetable change, the following services stop at Mungivacca:

- Regionale: local service between Bari Centrale and Putignano.
