= Locorotondo railway station =

Railway station in Italy

Locorotondo
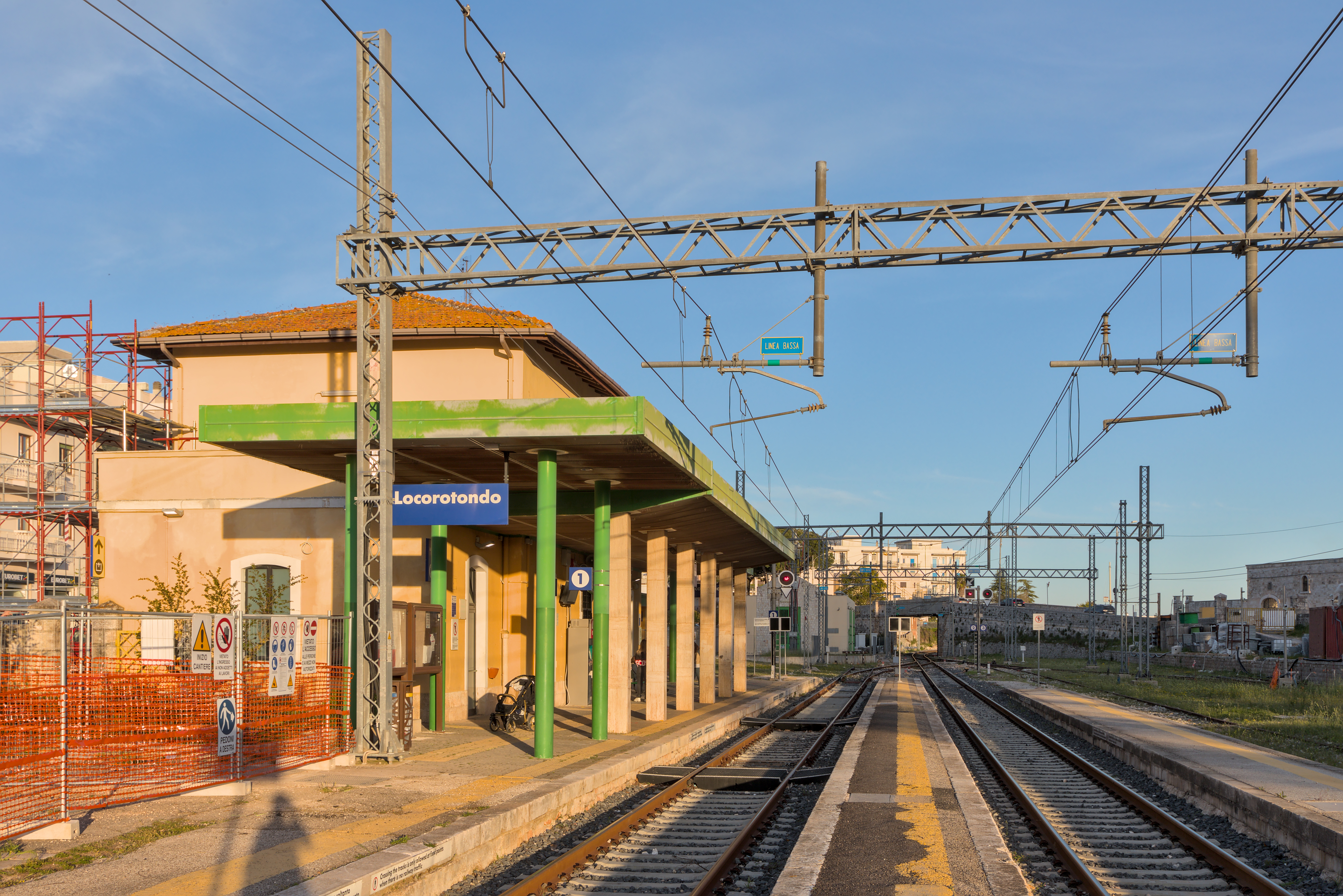
- The station in 2025

General information
- Location: Locorotondo, Bari, Apulia; Italy
- Coordinates: 40°45′21″N 17°19′15″E
- Owner: Ferrovie del Sud Est
- Line: Bari–Martina Franca–Taranto railway
- Platforms: 3
- Train operators: Ferrovie del Sud Est

Services
Preceding station	Ferrovie del Sud Est	Following station
Alberobello towards Putignano	Regionale; Putignano–Martina Franca	Martina Franca Terminus
Location
- Location within Apulia

Locorotondo railway station (Italian: Stazione di Locorotondo) is a railway station in Locorotondo, Italy. The station is located on the Bari–Martina Franca–Taranto railway. The train services and the railway infrastructure are operated by Ferrovie del Sud Est.

== Services ==
As of the June 2025 timetable change, the following services stop at Locorotondo:

- Regionale: local service between Bari Centrale and Martina Franca.
