= Crispiano railway station =

Railway station in Italy

Crispiano

General information
- Location: Crispiano, Taranto, Apulia
- Coordinates: 40°36′17″N 17°14′16″E
- Owner: Ferrovie del Sud Est
- Line: Bari–Martina Franca–Taranto railway
- Platforms: 2
- Train operators: Ferrovie del Sud Est

Services
Preceding station	Ferrovie del Sud Est	Following station
San Paolo towards Martina Franca	Regionale; Martina Franca–Taranto	Statte towards Taranto
Location
- Location within Apulia Location within Southern Italy Location within Italy

Crispiano railway station (Italian: Stazione di Crispiano) is a railway station in Crispiano, Italy. The station is located on the Bari–Martina Franca–Taranto railway. The train services and the railway infrastructure are operated by Ferrovie del Sud Est. As of December 2024 a €7.5 million renovation project is underway to rebuild the station as an intermodal transportation hub.

== Services ==
As of the June 2025 timetable change, the following services stop at Crispiano:

- Regionale: local service between Martina Franca and Taranto.
