= Conversano railway station =

Railway station in Conversano, Italy

Conversano

General information
- Location: Conversano, Bari, Apulia
- Coordinates: 40°58′16″N 17°06′55″E
- Owner: Ferrovie del Sud Est
- Line: Bari–Martina Franca–Taranto railway
- Platforms: 2
- Train operators: Ferrovie del Sud Est

History
- Opened: 1900

Services
Preceding station	Ferrovie del Sud Est	Following station
Rutigliano Terminus	Regionale; Rutigliano–Putignano	Castellana Grotte towards Putignano
Location
- Location within Apulia Location within Southern Italy Location within Italy

Conversano railway station (Italian: Stazione di Conversano) is a railway station in Conversano, Italy. The station is located on the Bari–Martina Franca–Taranto railway. The train services and the railway infrastructure are operated by Ferrovie del Sud Est.

== Services ==
As of the June 2025 timetable change, the following services stop at Conversano:

- Regionale: local service between Rutigliano and Putignano.
