= Taranto Galese railway station =

Railway station in Taranto, Italy

Taranto Galese

General information
- Location: Taranto, Taranto, Apulia; Italy
- Coordinates: 40°29′40″N 17°14′06″E
- Owner: Ferrovie del Sud Est
- Line: Bari–Martina Franca–Taranto railway
- Platforms: 2
- Train operators: Ferrovie del Sud Est

Services
Preceding station	Ferrovie del Sud Est	Following station
Statte towards Martina Franca	Regionale; Martina Franca–Taranto	Taranto Terminus
Location
- Location within Apulia Location within Southern Italy Location within Italy

Taranto Galese railway station (Italian: Stazione di Taranto Galese) is a railway station in Taranto, Italy. The station is located on the Bari–Martina Franca–Taranto railway. The train services and the railway infrastructure are operated by Ferrovie del Sud Est.

== Services ==
As of the June 2025 timetable change, the following services stop at Taranto Galese:

- Regionale: local service between Martina Franca and Taranto.
