= Statte railway station =

Railway station in Statte, Italy

Statte
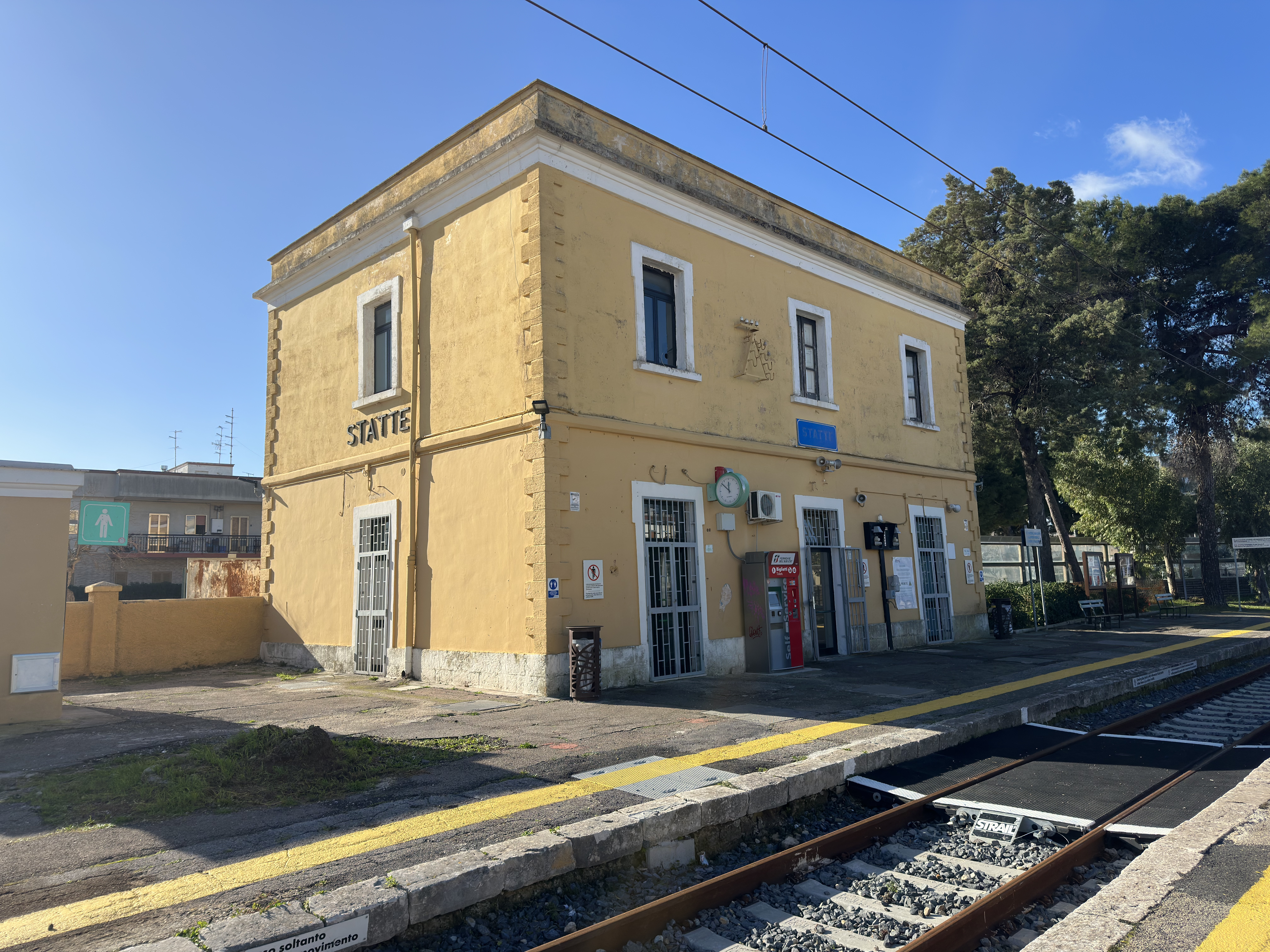
- The station building in 2025

General information
- Location: Statte, Taranto, Apulia; Italy
- Coordinates: 40°33′56″N 17°12′45″E
- Owner: Ferrovie del Sud Est
- Line: Bari–Martina Franca–Taranto railway
- Platforms: 2
- Train operators: Ferrovie del Sud Est

Services
| Preceding station | Ferrovie del Sud Est | Following station |
|---|---|---|
| Crispiano towards Martina Franca | Regionale; Martina Franca–Taranto | Taranto Galese towards Taranto |
Location
- Location within Apulia Location within Southern Italy Location within Italy

Statte railway station (Italian: Stazione di Statte) is a railway station in Statte, Italy. The station is located on the Bari–Martina Franca–Taranto railway. The train services and the railway infrastructure are operated by Ferrovie del Sud Est.

== Services ==
As of the June 2025 timetable change, the following services stop at Statte:

- Regionale: local service between Martina Franca and Taranto.
