= Martina Franca-Colonne Grassi railway station =

Railway station in Italy

Martina Franca–Colonne Grassi

General information
- Location: Martina Franca, Taranto, Apulia; Italy
- Coordinates: 40°41′07″N 17°19′53″E
- Owner: Rete Ferroviaria Italiana
- Line: Bari–Martina Franca–Taranto railway
- Platforms: 1
- Train operators: Ferrovie del Sud Est

Services
Preceding station	Ferrovie del Sud Est	Following station
Martina Franca Terminus	Regionale; Martina Franca–Taranto	San Paolo towards Taranto
Location
- Location within Apulia Location within Southern Italy Location within Italy

Martina Franca-Colonne Grassi railway station (Italian: Stazione di Martina Franca-Colonne Grassi) is a railway station in Martina Franca, Italy. The station is located on the Bari–Martina Franca–Taranto railway. The train services are operated by Ferrovie del Sud Est.

== Services ==
As of the June 2025 timetable change, the following services stop at Martina Franca-Colonne Grassi:

- Regionale: local service between Martina Franca and Taranto.
