= Novoli railway station =

Italian railway station

Novoli

General information
- Location: Novoli, Province of Lecce, Apulia; Italy
- Coordinates: 40°22′53″N 18°02′53″E
- Owner: Ferrovie del Sud Est
- Operator: Ferrovie del Sud Est
- Lines: Martina Franca-Lecce railway Novoli-Gagliano del Capo railway
- Platforms: 4
Location
- Location within Apulia Location within Southern Italy Location within Italy

Novoli is a railway station in Novoli, Italy. The station is located on the Martina Franca-Lecce railway and Novoli-Gagliano del Capo railway. The train services and the railway infrastructure are operated by Ferrovie del Sud Est.

== Train services ==
The station is served by the following service(s):

- Local services (Treno regionale) Martina Franca - Francavilla Fontana - Novoli - Lecce
- Local services (Treno regionale) Novoli - Nardo - Casarano - Gagliano
