= Maglie railway station =

Railway station in Maglie, Italy

Maglie

General information
- Location: Maglie, Province of Lecce, Apulia; Italy
- Coordinates: 40°07′33″N 18°17′59″E
- Owner: Ferrovie del Sud Est
- Operator: Ferrovie del Sud Est
- Lines: Lecce–Otranto railway Maglie-Gagliano del Capo railway
- Platforms: 3
Location
- Location within Apulia Location within Southern Italy Location within Italy

Maglie is a railway station in Maglie, Italy. The station is located on the Lecce–Otranto railway and Maglie-Gagliano del Capo railway. The train services and the railway infrastructure are operated by Ferrovie del Sud Est.

== Train services ==
The station is served by the following service(s):

- Local services (Treno regionale) Zollino - Maglie - Tricase - Gagliano
- Local services (Treno regionale) Maglie - Otranto
