= Rutigliano (disambiguation) =

Rutigliano is a town and commune in the Metropolitan City of Bari in the Apulia region in southern Italy.

Rutigliano may also refer to:

- Rutigliano (surname)
- Rutigliano railway station, Rutigliano, Italy
