= Rutigliano railway station =

Railway station in Rutigliano, Italy

Rutigliano

General information
- Location: Rutigliano, Bari, Apulia; Italy
- Coordinates: 41°00′42″N 17°00′30″E
- Owner: Ferrovie del Sud Est
- Line: Bari–Martina Franca–Taranto railway
- Platforms: 2
- Train operators: Ferrovie del Sud Est

History
- Opened: 1900

Services
Preceding station	Ferrovie del Sud Est	Following station
Terminus	Regionale; Rutigliano–Putignano	Conversano towards Putignano
Location
- Location within Apulia

Rutigliano railway station (Italian: Stazione di Rutigliano) is a railway station in Rutigliano, Italy. The station is located on the Bari–Martina Franca–Taranto railway. The train services and the railway infrastructure are operated by Ferrovie del Sud Est.

== Services ==
As of the June 2025 timetable change, the following services stop at Rutigliano:

- Regionale: local service to Putignano. The line west to Bari Centrale is abandoned/suspended and replaced with bus service.
