= Zollino railway station =

Railway station in Italy

Zollino
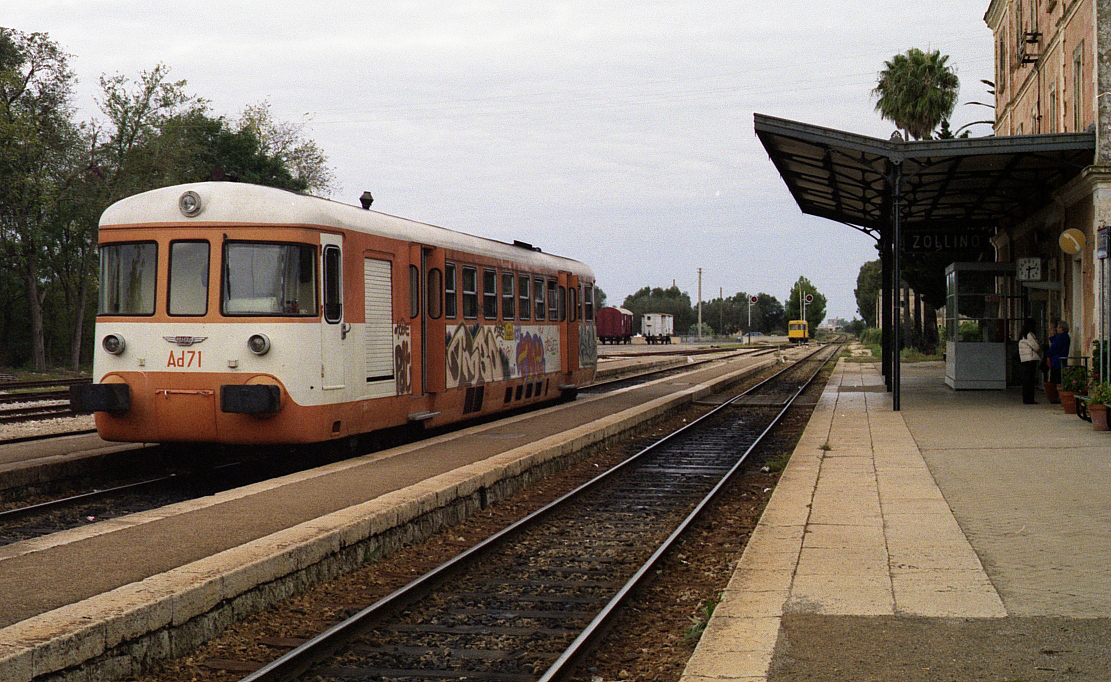
- Zollino railway station

General information
- Location: Zollino, Province of Lecce, Apulia; Italy
- Coordinates: 40°11′56″N 18°14′14″E
- Owner: Ferrovie del Sud Est
- Operator: Ferrovie del Sud Est
- Lines: Lecce–Otranto railway Zollino-Gallipoli railway
- Platforms: 3
Location
- Location within Italy

Zollino is a railway station in Zollino, Italy. The station is located on the Lecce–Otranto railway and Zollino-Gallipoli railway. The train services and the railway infrastructure are operated by Ferrovie del Sud Est.

== Train services ==
The station is served by the following service(s):

- Local services (Treno regionale) Lecce - Zollino - Nardo - Gallipoli
- Local services (Treno regionale) Zollino - Maglie - Tricase - Gagliano
