= Gallipoli railway station =

Railway station in Italy

Gallipoli

General information
- Location: Gallipoli, Province of Lecce, Apulia; Italy
- Coordinates: 40°03′27″N 17°59′17″E
- Owner: Ferrovie del Sud Est
- Operator: Ferrovie del Sud Est
- Lines: Zollino–Gallipoli railway Gallipoli–Casarano railway
- Platforms: 3
Location
- Location within Apulia Location within Southern Italy Location within Italy

Gallipoli is a railway station in Gallipoli, Apulia, Italy. The station is located on the Zollino–Gallipoli railway and Gallipoli–Casarano railway. The train services and the railway infrastructure are operated by Ferrovie del Sud Est.

== Train services ==
The station is served by the following service(s):

- Local services (Treno regionale) Lecce - Zollino - Nardo - Gallipoli
- Local services (Treno regionale) Casarano - Gallipoli
