= Otranto railway station =

Italian train station

Otranto
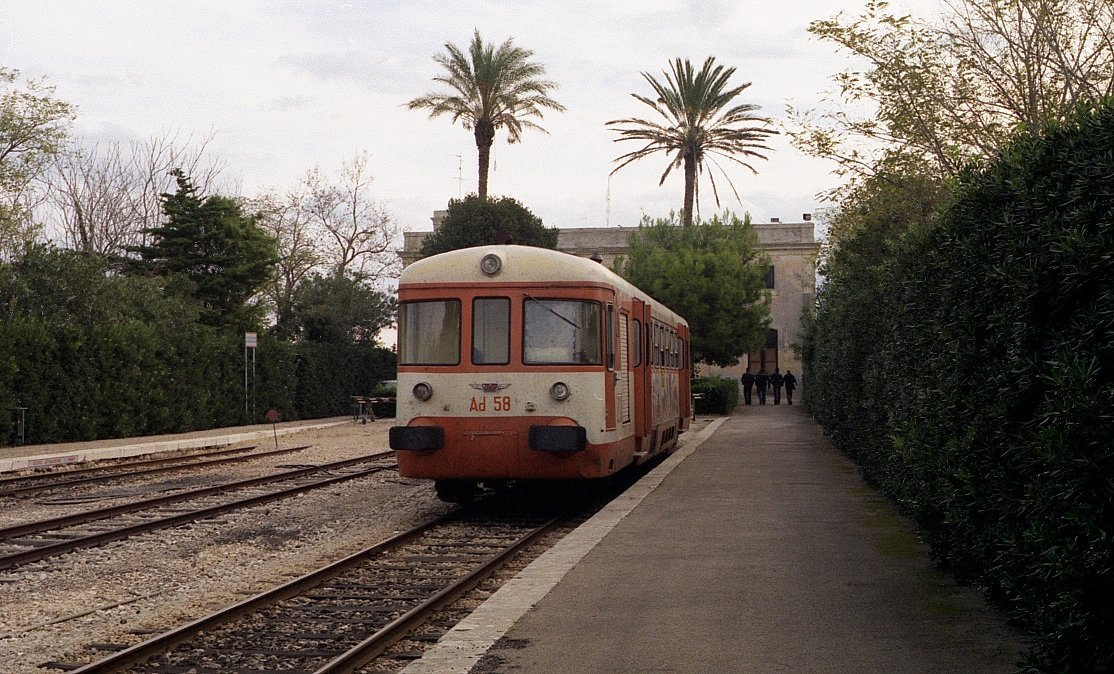
- Otranto railway station

General information
- Location: Otranto, Province of Lecce, Apulia; Italy
- Coordinates: 40°08′58″N 18°28′49″E
- Owner: Ferrovie del Sud Est
- Operator: Ferrovie del Sud Est
- Line: Lecce–Otranto railway
- Platforms: 2
Location
- Location within Apulia Location within Southern Italy Location within Italy

Otranto is a railway station in Otranto, Italy. The station is located on the Lecce–Otranto railway. The train services and the railway infrastructure are operated by Ferrovie del Sud Est.

== Train services ==
The station is served by the following service(s):

- Local services (Treno regionale) Maglie - Otranto
