= Accademia Musicale Mediterranea =

The Accademia Musicale Mediterranea (English: Mediterranean Musical Academy) is a music institute in Rome, Taranto, Martina Franca, Leporano and Fardella, Italy. It was founded by Cosimo Damiano Lanza in 1996 as a national centre for advanced musical studies. It is located in the Palazzo Lanza in Leporano near Taranto. Every year, the Academy organises piano master classes. During the summer months, a series of concerts are held under the title of Emozioni Concertistiche – young pianists festival. Annually it hosts students from all over Europe and the Orient. Since 2004 it has synergistic collaborations with universities, conservatories and schools: Brigham Young University, USA; Münchener Musikseminar in Munich, Germany; Conservatory of Gap, France; Conservatorios of S. Javier, Spain; Bocconi University, Milan; the Conservatory "Pedrollo" Vicenza; Conservatory "N. Piccinni", Bari; International Academy of Arts in Rome, Italy. The director is Prof. Cosimo Damiano Lanza and the president is Prof. Valter Monteleone.

== Professors ==
- Piano: Bruno Canino, Piero Rattalino, Roberto Cappello, Cosimo Damiano Lanza, Aquiles Delle Vigne,Christopher Park, Leonora Armellini, Alberto Miodini, Roberto Corlianò, Giovanni Umberto Battel, Gianmaria Bonino, Francesca Mammana, Daniele Puglielli, Silvana Libardo, Agnese Urso, Pierpaolo Morbidelli, Valfrido Ferrari, Alessandro Pisconti, Eduardo Franco Rondina, Vincenzo De Filpo, Pierluigi Camicia
- Violin: Ivan Rabaglia, Cybèle Stevenson, Pasquale Melucci
- Cello: Marcello Forte, Umberto Clerici
- Flute: Salvatore Stefanelli
- Guitar: Pino Forrésu
- Singing: Elvira Zamanova, Filomena Galeandro
- Clarinet: Maria Teresa Strappati, Angelo Magnaterra
- Trumpet: Rinaldo Strappati
- Harpsichord: Cosimo Damiano Lanza
- Organ: Francesco Buccolieri
- Composition: Francesco Rolle, Vito Buccolieri, Francesco Buccolieri

== Piano events ==
- 2025 (Chamber Music Festival) Mediterraneo
- 2010 Premio Italia Olimpo Pianistico (piano competition)
- 1982 Emozioni Concertistiche (festival of young pianists)

== Labels recordings ==
H-Demia Classic Recording:

- 2007 Da Brahms alle scuole Nazionali – piano: Agnese Urso and Pierpaolo Morbidelli
- 2007 Il Romanticismo di Schumann – piano: Alessandro Fichera and Marco Ragno
- 2011 Il pianismo di Gaetano Frascella
- 2012 Hillpark – Valter Monteleone
- 2014 Live – pianist Cosimo Damiano Lanza
