= Francavilla Fontana railway station =

Railway station in Francavilla Fontana, Italy

Francavilla Fontana
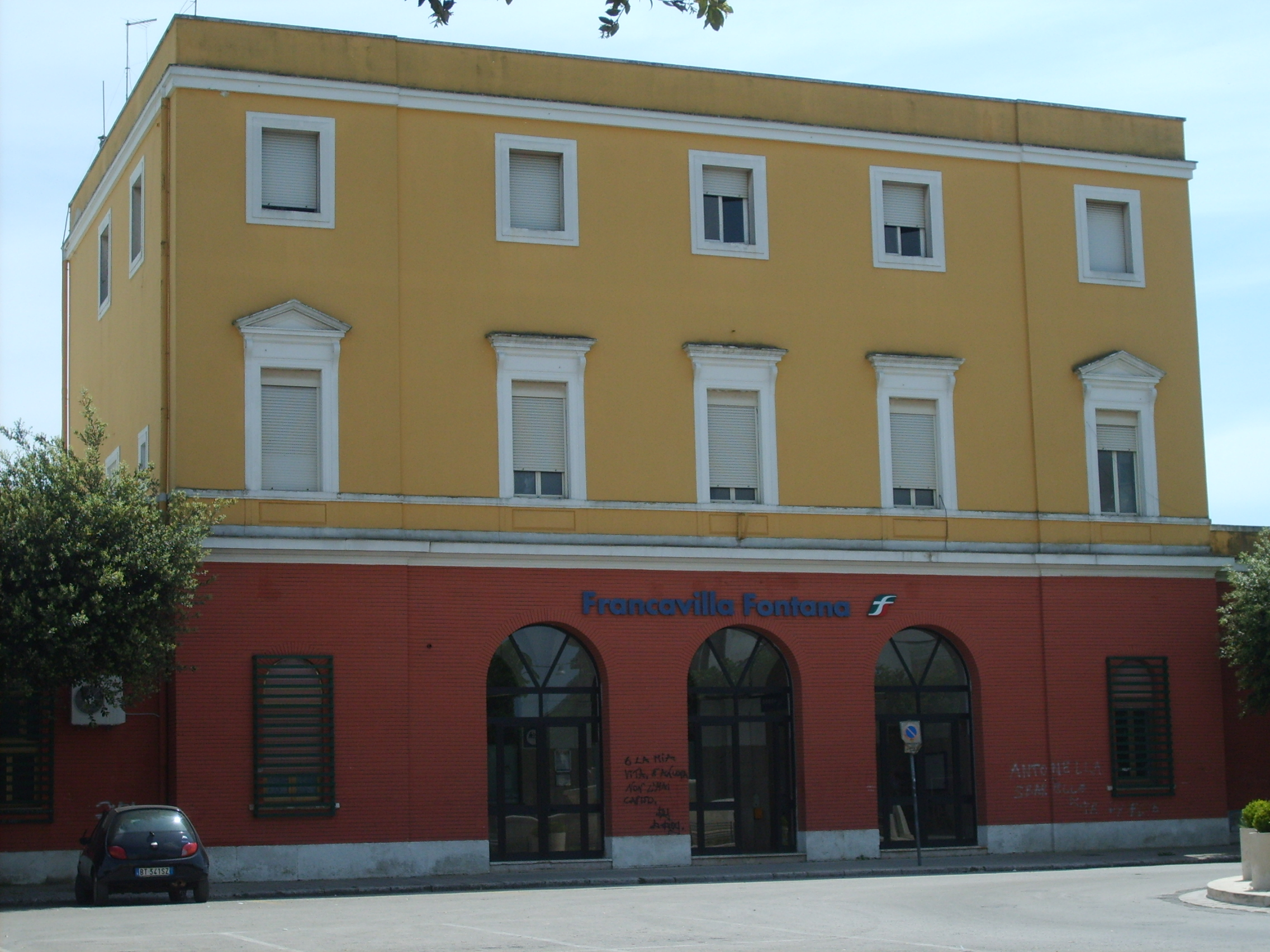
- Francavilla Fontana railway station

General information
- Location: Francavilla Fontana, Brindisi, Apulia; Italy
- Coordinates: 40°31′23″N 17°35′02″E
- Owner: Rete Ferroviaria Italiana
- Lines: Taranto–Brindisi railway Martina Franca-Lecce railway
- Platforms: 5
- Train operators: Trenitalia; Ferrovie del Sud Est

Other information
- Classification: Silver

History
- Opened: 1886
Location
- Location within Apulia Location within Italy

Francavilla Fontana is a railway station in Francavilla Fontana, Italy. The station is located on the Taranto–Brindisi railway and Martina Franca-Lecce railway. The train services are operated by Trenitalia and Ferrovie del Sud Est. The railway infrastructure is managed by Rete Ferroviaria Italiana.

== Train services ==
The station is served by the following service(s):

- Night train (Intercity Notte) Milan - Ancona - Pescara - Foggia - Bari - Taranto - Brindisi - Lecce
- Local services (Treno regionale) Taranto - Francavilla Fontana - Brindisi
- Local services (Treno regionale) Martina Franca - Francavilla Fontana - Novoli - Lecce

== See also ==
- History of Francavilla Fontana
