= Cisternino Città railway station =

Italian railway station

Cisternino Città

General information
- Location: Cisternino, Province of Brindisi, Apulia; Italy
- Coordinates: 40°44′13″N 17°25′35″E
- Owner: Ferrovie del Sud Est
- Operator: Ferrovie del Sud Est
- Line: Martina Franca-Lecce railway
- Platforms: 2
Location
- Location within Apulia Location within Southern Italy Location within Italy

Cisternino Città is a railway station in Cisternino, Italy. The station is located on the Martina Franca-Lecce railway. The train services and the railway infrastructure are operated by Ferrovie del Sud Est.

== Train services ==
The station is served by the following service(s):

- Local services (Treno regionale) Martina Franca - Francavilla Fontana - Novoli - Lecce
