= Gagliano Leuca railway station =

Railway station in Gagliano del Capo, Italy

Gagliano Leuca
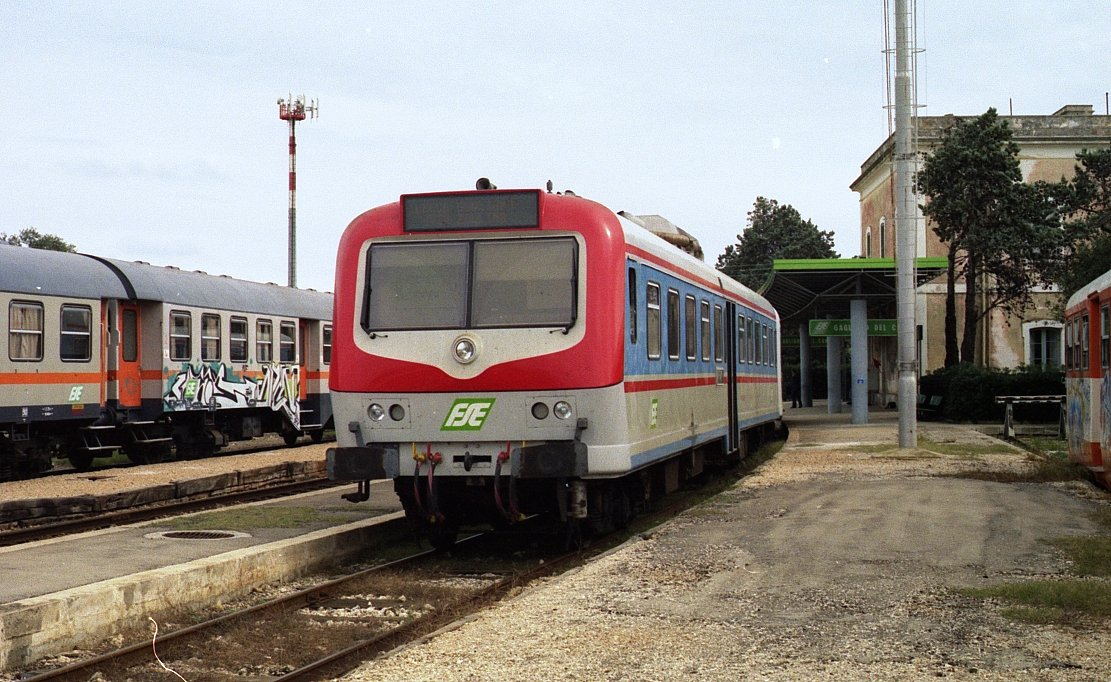
- Gagliano Leuca railway station

General information
- Location: Gagliano del Capo, Province of Lecce, Apulia; Italy
- Coordinates: 39°51′02″N 18°21′33″E
- Owner: Ferrovie del Sud Est
- Operator: Ferrovie del Sud Est
- Lines: Novoli-Gagliano del Capo railway Maglie-Gagliano del Capo railway
- Platforms: 3
Location
- Location within Apulia Location within Southern Italy Location within Italy

Gagliano Leuca is a railway station in Gagliano del Capo. The station is located on the Novoli-Gagliano del Capo railway and Maglie-Gagliano del Capo railway. The train services and the railway infrastructure are operated by Ferrovie del Sud Est.

== Train services ==
The station is served by the following service(s):

- Local services (Treno regionale) Zollino - Maglie - Tricase - Gagliano
- Local services (Treno regionale) Novoli - Nardo - Casarano - Gagliano
