= Carbonara di Bari =

Commune in Apulia, Italy

- Comune
- Comune di Carbonara di Bari

- Location within Italy Location within Apulia
- Coordinates: 41°4′30″N 16°52′9.48″E
- Country: Italy
- Region: Apulia
- Metropolitan city: Bari
- Time zone: UTC+1 (CET)
  - Summer (DST): UTC+2 (CEST)

Carbonara di Bari is a quartiere of Bari, in the region of Apulia in Italy.

== Landmarks ==
Carbonara contains the Bari Ceglie-Carbonara railway station, as well as the Bari War Cemetery. The cemetery contains 2,054 Commonwealth casualties of the First and Second world wars.
