= Martina Franca railway station =

Railway station in Martina Franca, Italy

Martina Franca
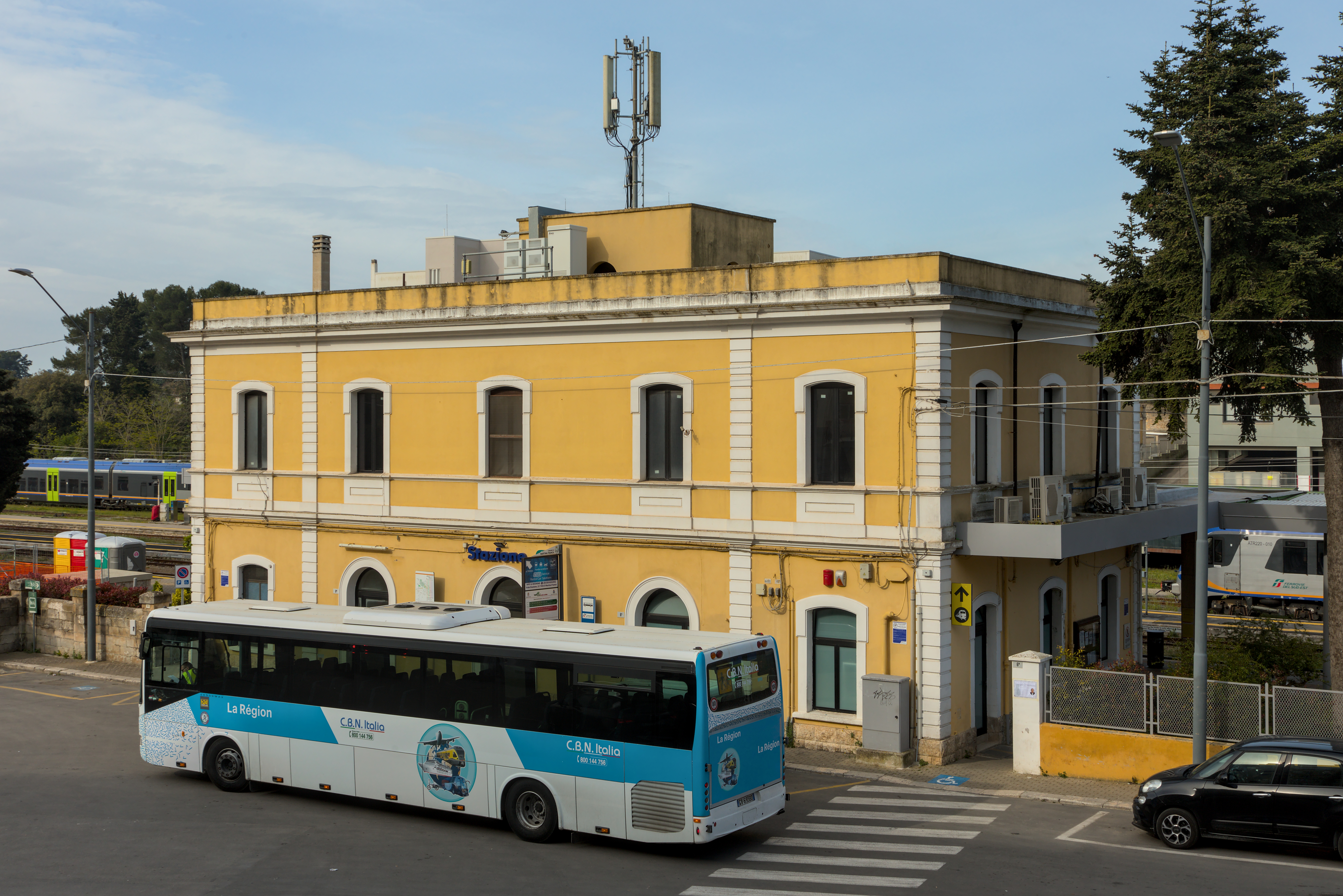
- Martina Franca railway station, with a CBN Italia bus stopping by

General information
- Location: Martina Franca, Taranto, Apulia; Italy
- Coordinates: 40°42′01″N 17°19′55″E
- Owner: Ferrovie del Sud Est
- Lines: Bari–Martina Franca–Taranto railway Martina Franca–Lecce railway
- Platforms: 4
- Train operators: Ferrovie del Sud Est

Services
Preceding station	Ferrovie del Sud Est	Following station
Locorotondo towards Putignano	Regionale; Putignano–Martina Franca	Terminus
Terminus	Regionale; Martina Franca–Francavilla Fontana	Cisternino Città towards Francavilla Fontana
Terminus	Regionale; Martina Franca–Taranto	Martina Franca-Colonne Grassi towards Taranto
Location
- Location within Apulia Location within Southern Italy Location within Italy

Martina Franca railway station (Italian: Stazione di Martina Franca) is a railway station in Martina Franca, Italy. The station is located on the Bari–Martina Franca–Taranto railway and Martina Franca–Lecce railway. The train services and the railway infrastructure are operated by Ferrovie del Sud Est.

== Services ==
As of the June 2025 timetable change, the following services stop at Martina Franca:

- Regionale: local service to Bari Centrale, Lecce, and Taranto.
