= Novoli-Gagliano del Capo railway =

Railway line in Italy

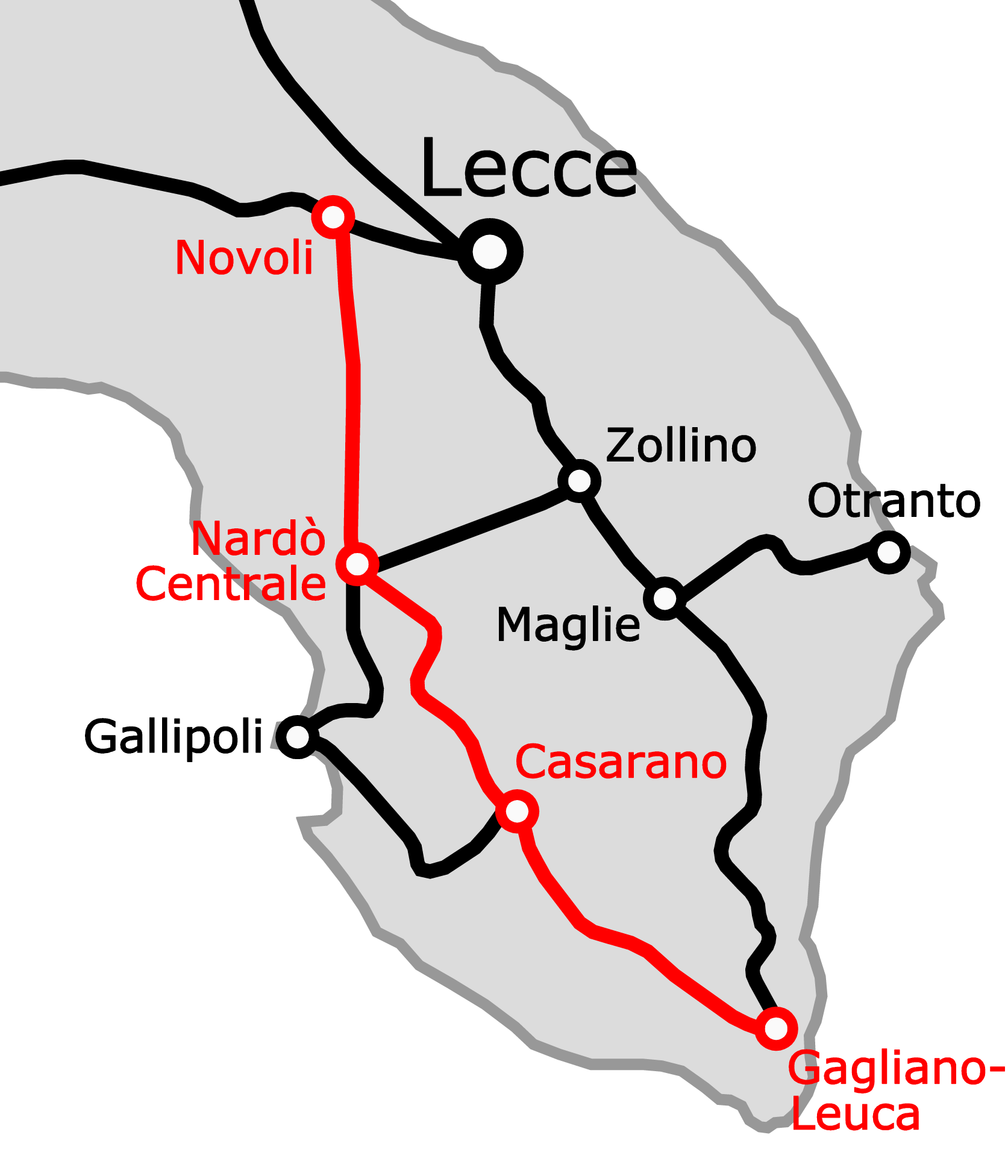

Overview
- Status: in use
- Owner: RFI
- Locale: Italy
- Termini: Novoli railway station; Gagliano Leuca railway station

Service
- Type: Heavy rail
- Operator: Ferrovie del Sud Est

History
- Opened: In stages between 1907 and 1911

Technical
- Line length: 75 km (47 mi)
- Number of tracks: Single track
- Track gauge: 1,435 mm (4 ft 8 1/2 in) standard gauge

The Novoli-Gagliano del Capo railway is an Italian 75-kilometre (47-mile) long railway line, that connects Novoli with Gagliano del Capo. The route operates through the region of Apulia.

== History ==
The line was opened in stages between 1907 and 1911.

== Usage ==
The line is used by the following service(s):

- Local services (Treno regionale) Novoli - Nardo - Casarano - Gagliano

== See also ==
- List of railway lines in Italy
