= Gallipoli–Casarano railway =

Railway line in Italy

Gallipoli-Casarano railway
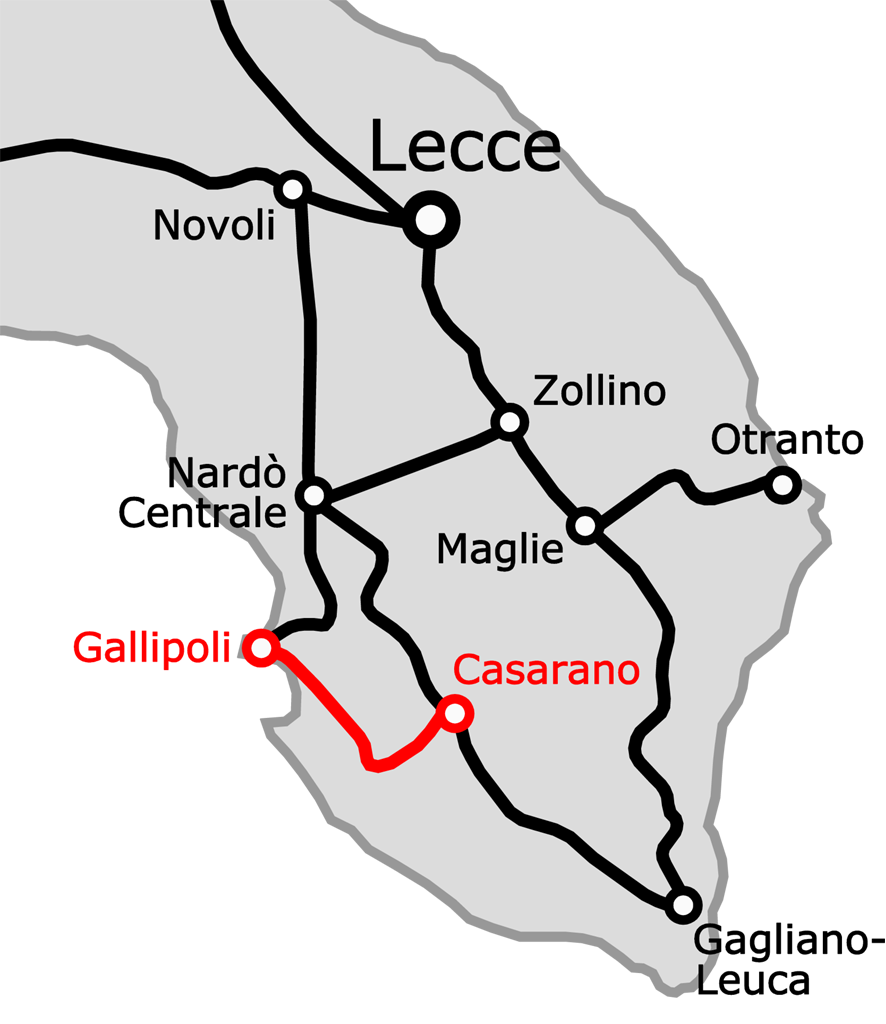

Overview
- Status: in use
- Owner: RFI
- Locale: Italy
- Termini: Gallipoli railway station; Casarano railway station

Service
- Type: Heavy rail
- Operator(s): Ferrovie del Sud Est

History
- Opened: 1919

Technical
- Line length: 22 km (14 mi)
- Number of tracks: Single track
- Track gauge: 1,435 mm (4 ft 8 1/2 in) standard gauge

The Gallipoli–Casarano railway is an Italian 22-kilometre (14-mile) long railway line, that connects Gallipoli with Casarano and Gagliano del Capo. The route operates through the region of Apulia.

== History ==
The line was opened in 1919.

== Usage ==
The line is used by the following service(s):

- Local services (Treno regionale) Gallipoli - Casarano

== See also ==
- List of railway lines in Italy
