= Zollino–Gallipoli railway =

Railway line in Italy

Zollino-Gallipoli railway
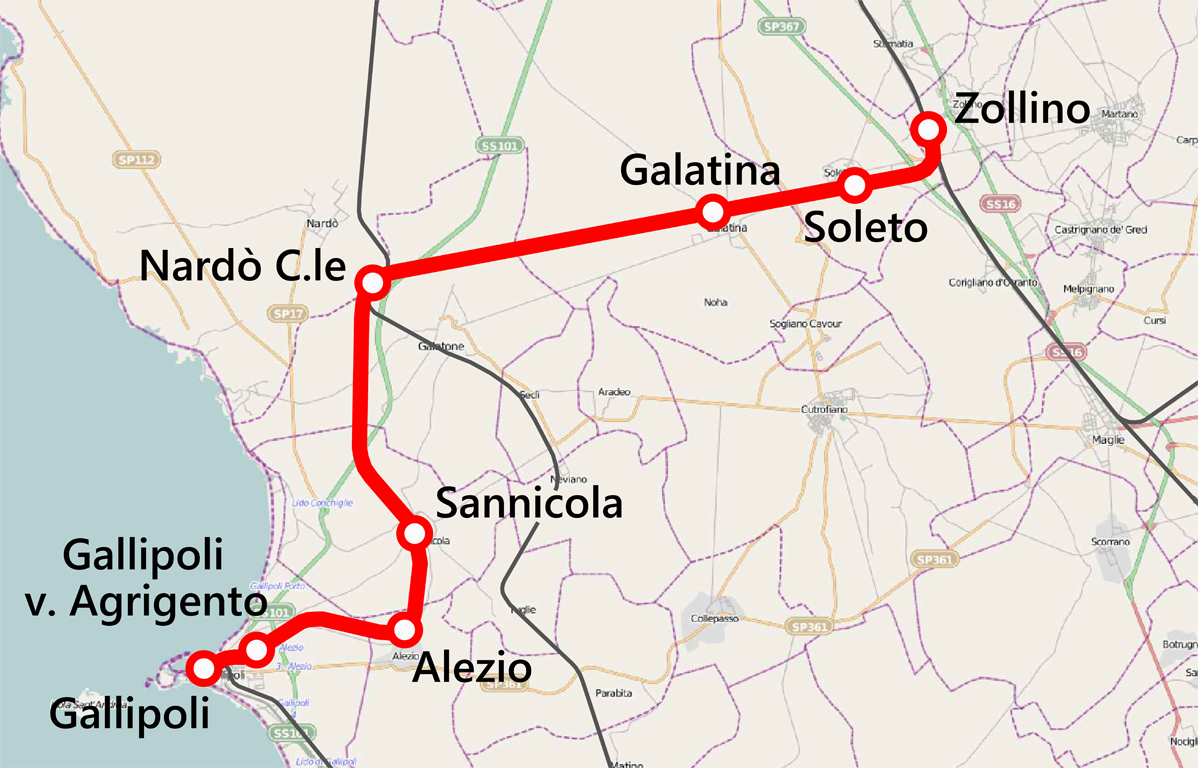

Overview
- Status: in use
- Owner: RFI
- Locale: Italy
- Termini: Zollino railway station; Gallipoli railway station

Service
- Type: Heavy rail
- Operator: Ferrovie del Sud Est

History
- Opened: In stages between 1884 and 1885

Technical
- Line length: 34 km (21 mi)
- Number of tracks: Single track
- Track gauge: 1,435 mm (4 ft 8 1/2 in) standard gauge

The Zollino–Gallipoli railway is an Italian 34-kilometre (21-mile) long railway line that connects Lecce and Zollino with Gallipoli in the region called Apulia.

== History ==
The line was opened in stages between 1884 and 1885.

== Usage ==
The line is used by the following service(s):

- Local services (Treno regionale) Lecce - Zollino - Nardo - Gallipoli

== See also ==
- List of railway lines in Italy
