= Rutigliano (surname) =

Rutigliano is a surname. Notable people with the surname include:

- Danny Rutigliano, American actor
- David Rutigliano (born 1965), American politician
- Sam Rutigliano (born 1931), American football coach and analyst
