= Leporano =

Leporano Lupranu
- Comune
- Comune di Leporano
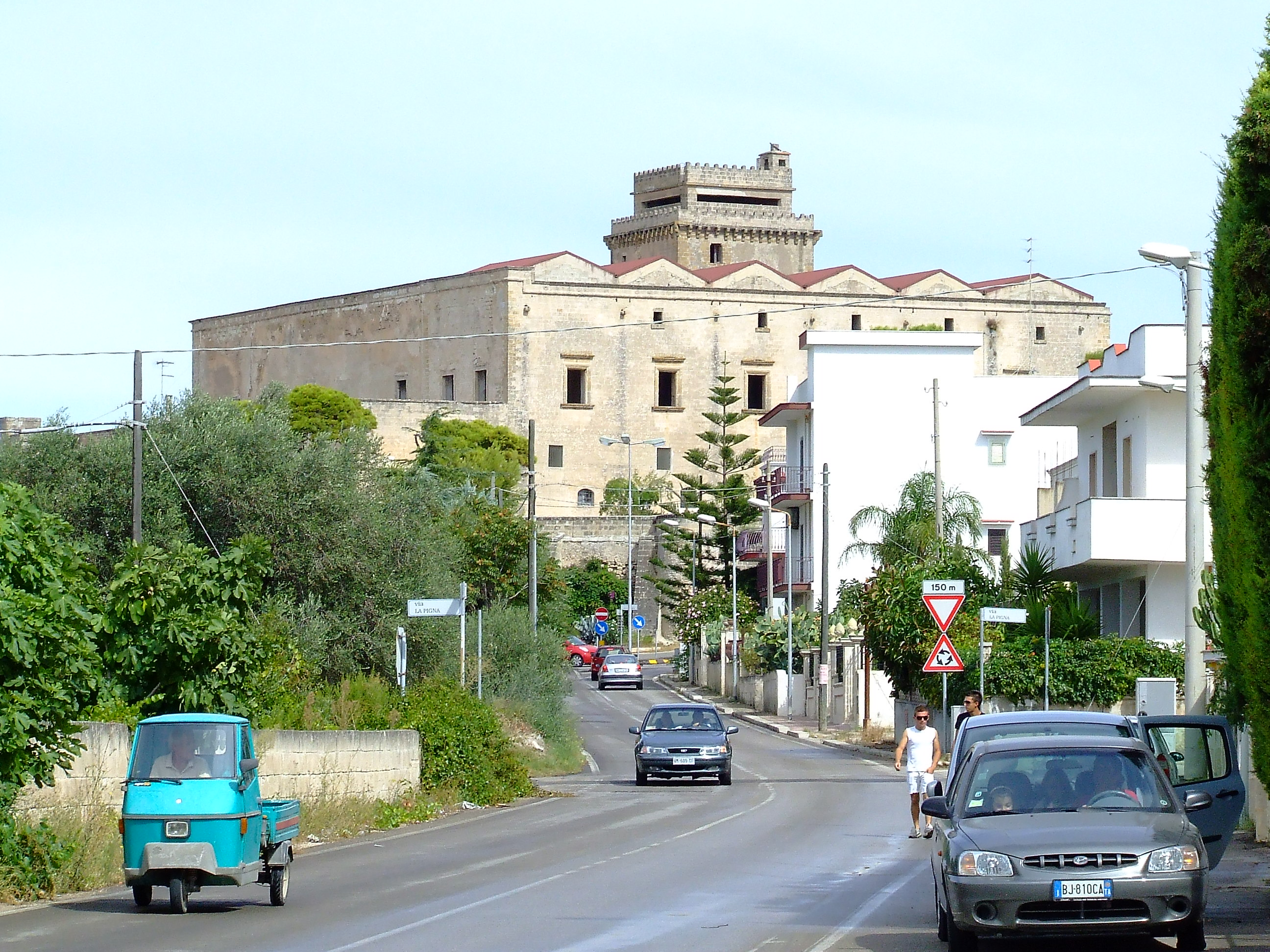
- View of Leporano

- Location within Italy Location within Apulia
- Coordinates: 40°23′N 17°20′E
- Country: Italy
- Region: Apulia
- Province: Taranto (TA)
- Frazioni: Marina di Leporano

Government
  - Mayor: Angelo D'Abramo

Area
  - Total: 15 km^{2} (5.8 sq mi)
- Elevation: 47 m (154 ft)

Population (28 February 2017)
  - Total: 8,082
  - Density: 540/km^{2} (1,400/sq mi)
- Demonym: Leporanesi (Lupranisi in local dialect)
- Time zone: UTC+1 (CET)
  - Summer (DST): UTC+2 (CEST)
- Postal code: 74020
- Dialing code: 099
- Patron saint: St. Emygdius
- Saint day: 5 August
- Website: Official website

Leporano (Salentino: Luprànë) is a town and comune in the province of Taranto, in the Apulia region of southeast Italy. The municipality of Leporano is a little maritime town at the Ionian Sea.

The noble family of the princes of Leporano is named after the town.

== Main sights ==
Sights include the fortress Castello Muscettola, the Saturo watch tower and the port of Pirrone.

== People ==
- Pino De Vittorio, singer, actor
- Emidio Greco, director
- Cosimo Damiano Lanza, pianist, harpsichordist, composer
- Carlo Veneziani, director
- Jole Veneziani, stylist
