= Lecce–Otranto railway =

Key southeastern Italian transport link

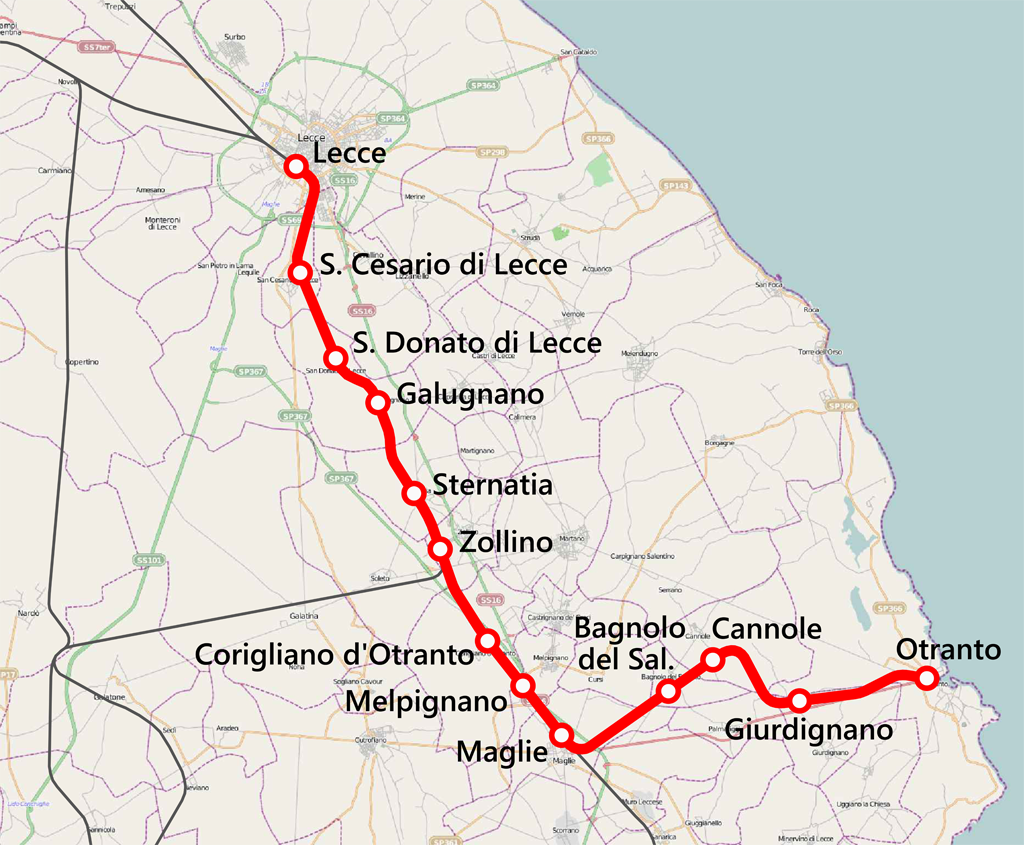

Overview
- Status: in use
- Owner: RFI
- Locale: Italy
- Termini: Lecce railway station; Otranto railway station

Service
- Type: Heavy rail
- Operator(s): Ferrovie del Sud Est

History
- Opened: In stages between 1868 and 1872

Technical
- Line length: 47 km (29 mi)
- Number of tracks: Single track
- Track gauge: 1,435 mm (4 ft 8 1/2 in) standard gauge

The Lecce–Otranto railway is an Italian 47-kilometre (29-mile) long railway line, that connects Lecce with Zollino, Maglie and Otranto. The route operates through the region of Apulia.

== History ==
The line was opened in stages between 1868 and 1872.

== Usage ==
The line is used by the following service(s):

- Local services (Treno regionale) Lecce–Zollino–Nardo–Gallipoli
- Local services (Treno regionale) Zollino– Maglie–Tricase–Gagliano
- Local services (Treno regionale) Maglie–Otranto

== See also ==
- List of railway lines in Italy
