= Putignano railway station =

Railway station in Putignano, Italy

Putignano
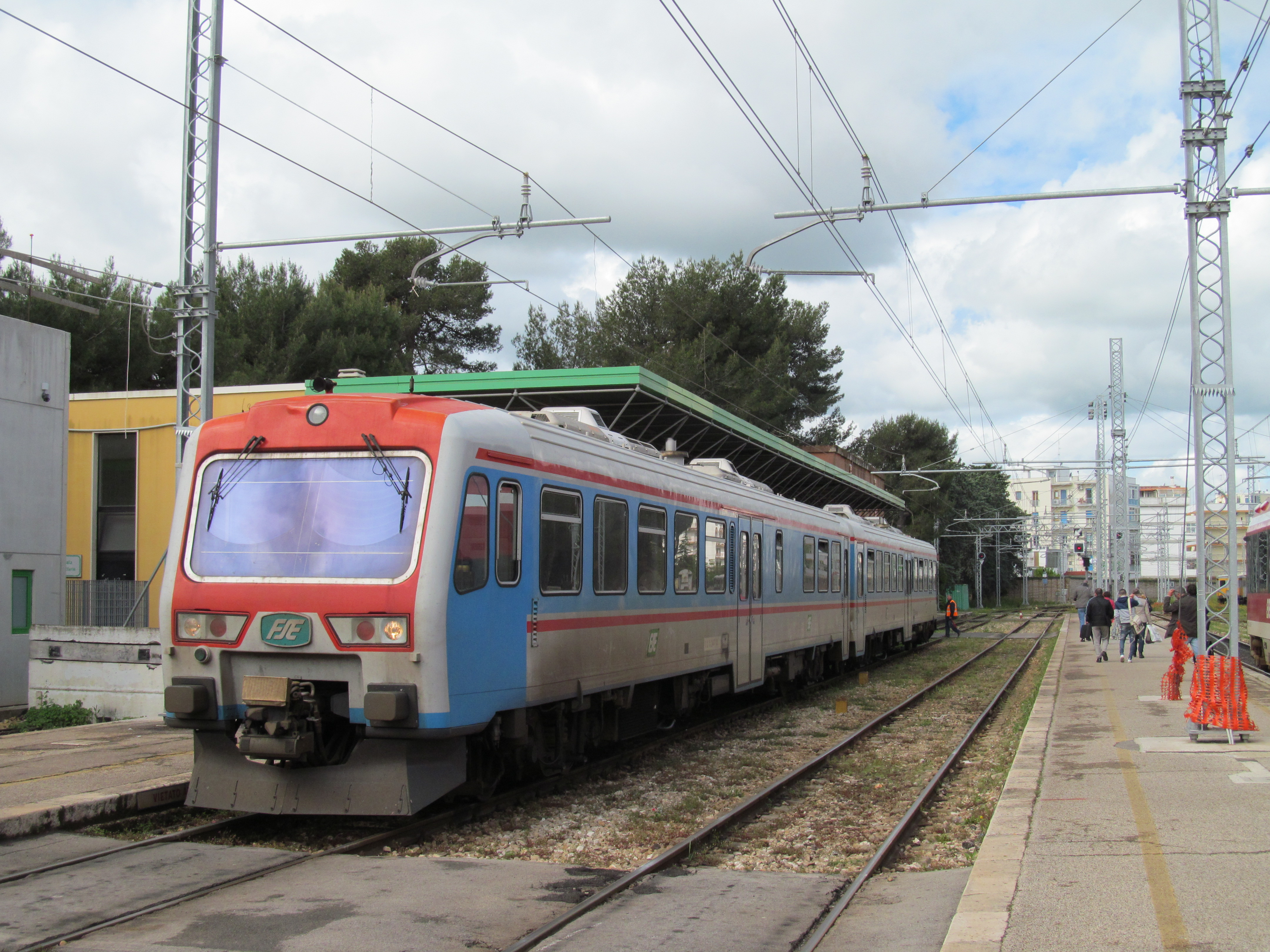
- Putignano railway station

General information
- Location: Putignano, Bari, Apulia; Italy
- Coordinates: 40°51′23″N 17°07′23″E
- Owner: Ferrovie del Sud Est
- Lines: Bari–Martina Franca–Taranto railway Bari-Casamassima-Putignano railway
- Platforms: 3
- Train operators: Ferrovie del Sud Est

Services
Preceding station	Ferrovie del Sud Est	Following station
Turi towards Bari Centrale	Regionale; Bari–Putignano	Terminus
Terminus	Regionale; Putignano–Martina Franca	Putignano Monte Laureto towards Martina Franca
Castellana Grotte towards Rutigliano	Regionale; Rutigliano–Putignano	Terminus
Location
- Location within Apulia Location within Southern Italy Location within Italy

Putignano railway station (Italian: Stazione di Putignano) is a railway station in Putignano, Italy. The station is located on the Bari–Martina Franca–Taranto railway and Bari-Casamassima-Putignano railway. The train services and the railway infrastructure are operated by Ferrovie del Sud Est.

== Services ==
As of the June 2025 timetable change, the following services stop at Putignano:

- Regionale: local service between Bari Centrale and Putignano and Martina Franca.
