= Martina Franca–Lecce railway =

Railway line in Italy

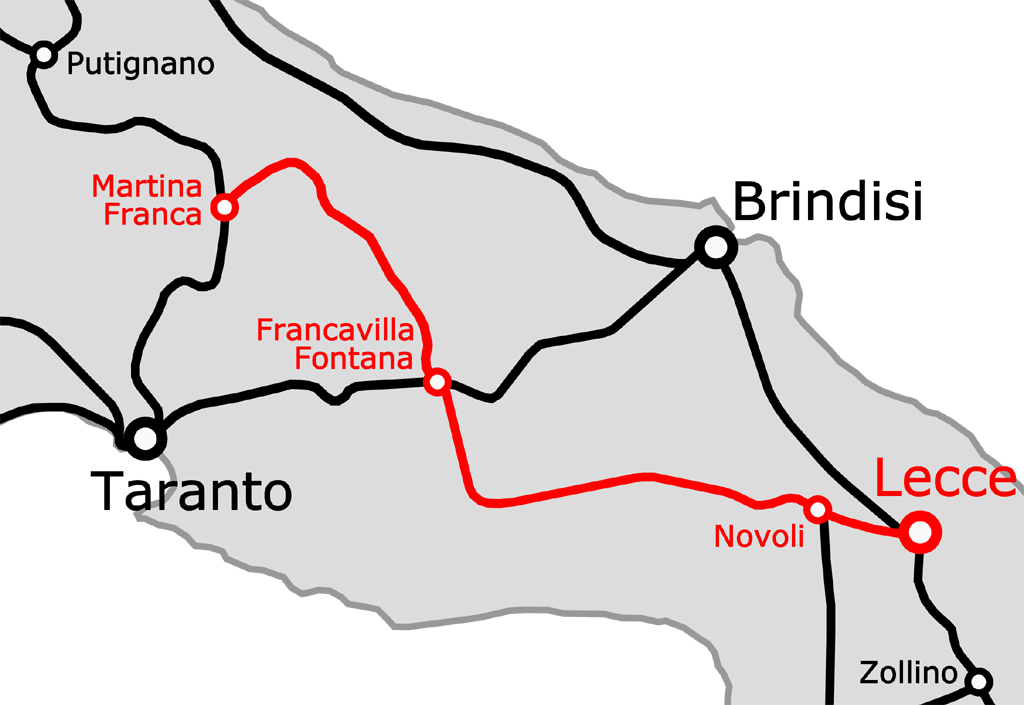

Overview
- Status: in use
- Owner: RFI
- Locale: Italy
- Termini: Martina Franca; Lecce

Service
- Type: Heavy rail
- Operator(s): Ferrovie del Sud Est

History
- Opened: 1907 (Lecce - Francavilla Fontana); 1925 (Francavilla Fontana - Martina Franca)

Technical
- Line length: 103 km (64 mi)
- Number of tracks: Single track
- Track gauge: 1,435 mm (4 ft 8 1/2 in) standard gauge

The Martina Franca–Lecce railway is an Italian 103-kilometre (64-mile) long railway line, that connects Martina Franca with Francavilla Fontana and Lecce.

The line was opened in four stages between 1907 and 1925. On 27 May 1907 the section from Lecce to Francavilla Fontana opened; the line was further extended on 14 August 1924 to Ceglie Messapica. On 5 April 1925 the line reached Cisternino and finally reached Martina Franca on 24 December 1925.

== Usage ==
The line is used by the following service(s):

- Local services (treno regionale): Martina Franca – Francavilla Fontana – Novoli – Lecce

== See also ==
- List of railway lines in Italy
