= Martina Franca =

Italian town

- Comune
- Città di Martina Franca
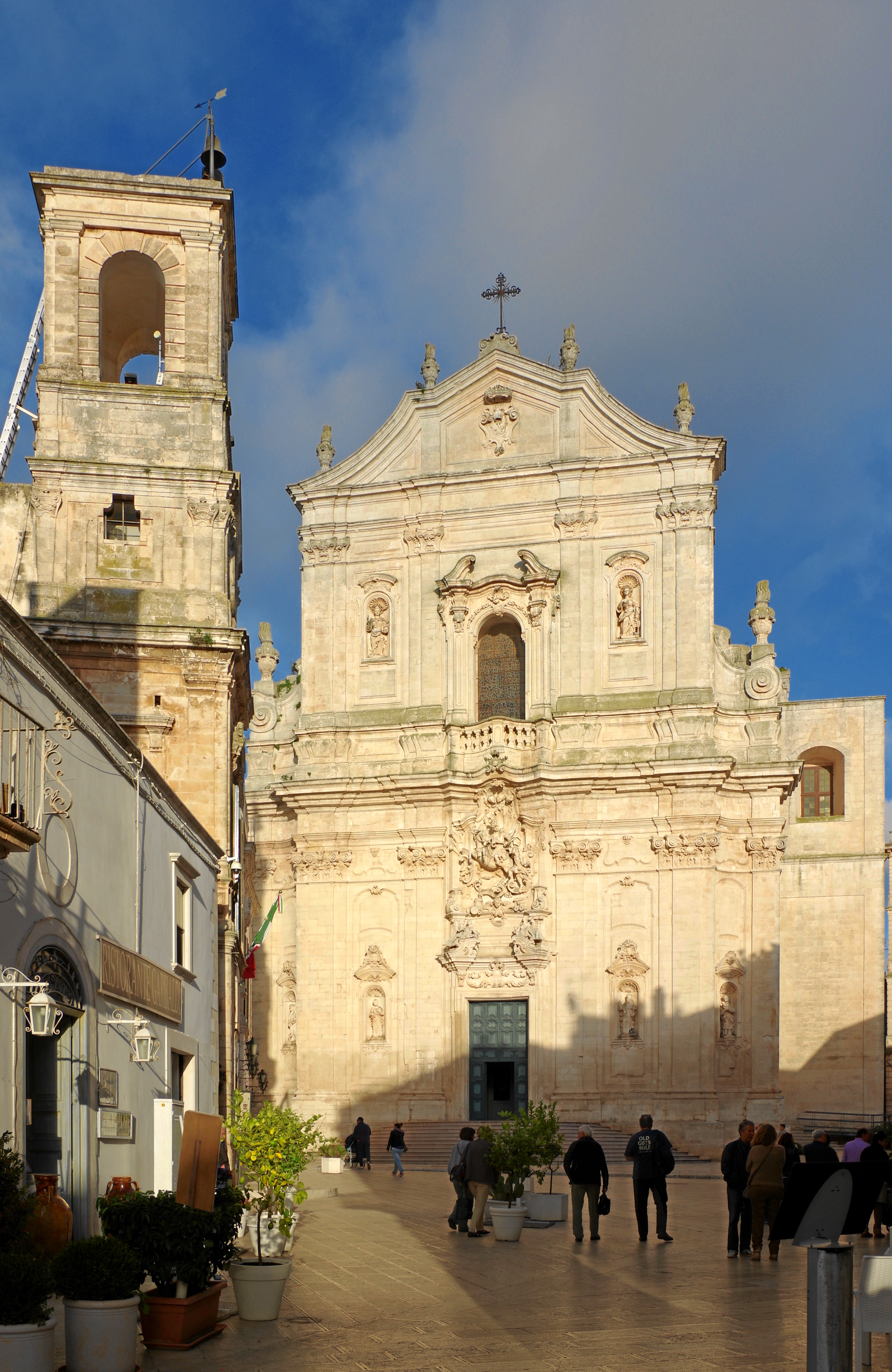
- Piazza Plebiscito and the Cathedral

- Coat of arms

- Martina within the Province of Taranto

- Location within Italy Location within Apulia
- Coordinates: 40°38′N 17°02′E
- Country: Italy
- Region: Apulia
- Province: Taranto (TA)
- Founded: 1300 AD
- Frazioni: Baratta, Capitolo, Cappuccini, Carpari, Gemma, Infarinata, Lamia Vecchia, Madonna dell'Arco, Monte Fellone, Monte Ilario, Montetulio, Monti del Duca, Motolese, Nigri, Ortolini, Papadomenico, Pergolo, Pianelle, San Paolo, Specchia Tarantina

Government
  - Mayor: Gianfranco Palmisano (PD)

Area
  - Total: 299.72 km^{2} (115.72 sq mi)
- Elevation: 431 m (1,414 ft)

Population (31 December 2017)
  - Total: 48,884
  - Density: 163.10/km^{2} (422.42/sq mi)
- Demonym: Martinesi
- Time zone: UTC+1 (CET)
  - Summer (DST): UTC+2 (CEST)
- Postal code: 74015
- Dialing code: 080
- Patron saint: San Martino
- Website: comune.martina-franca.ta.it

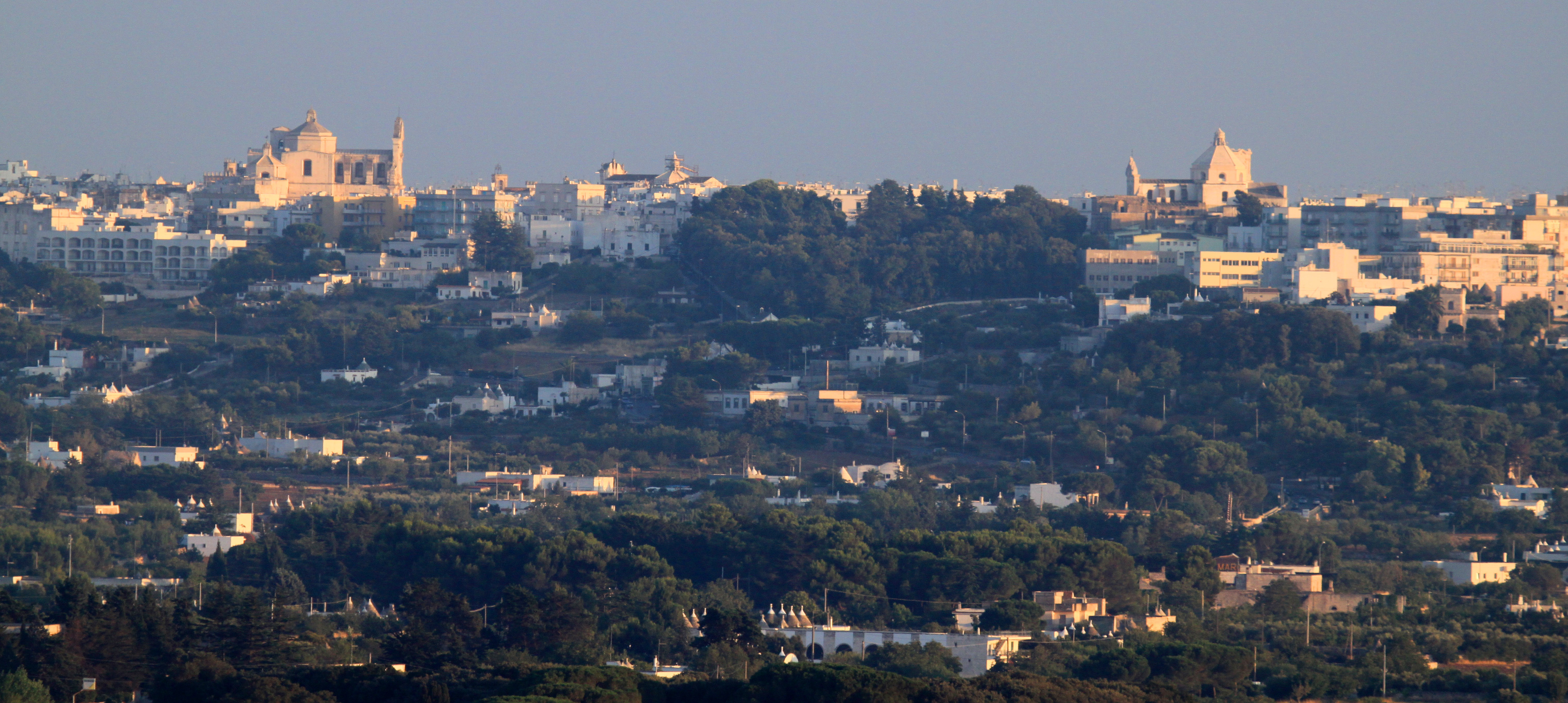
Panoramic view

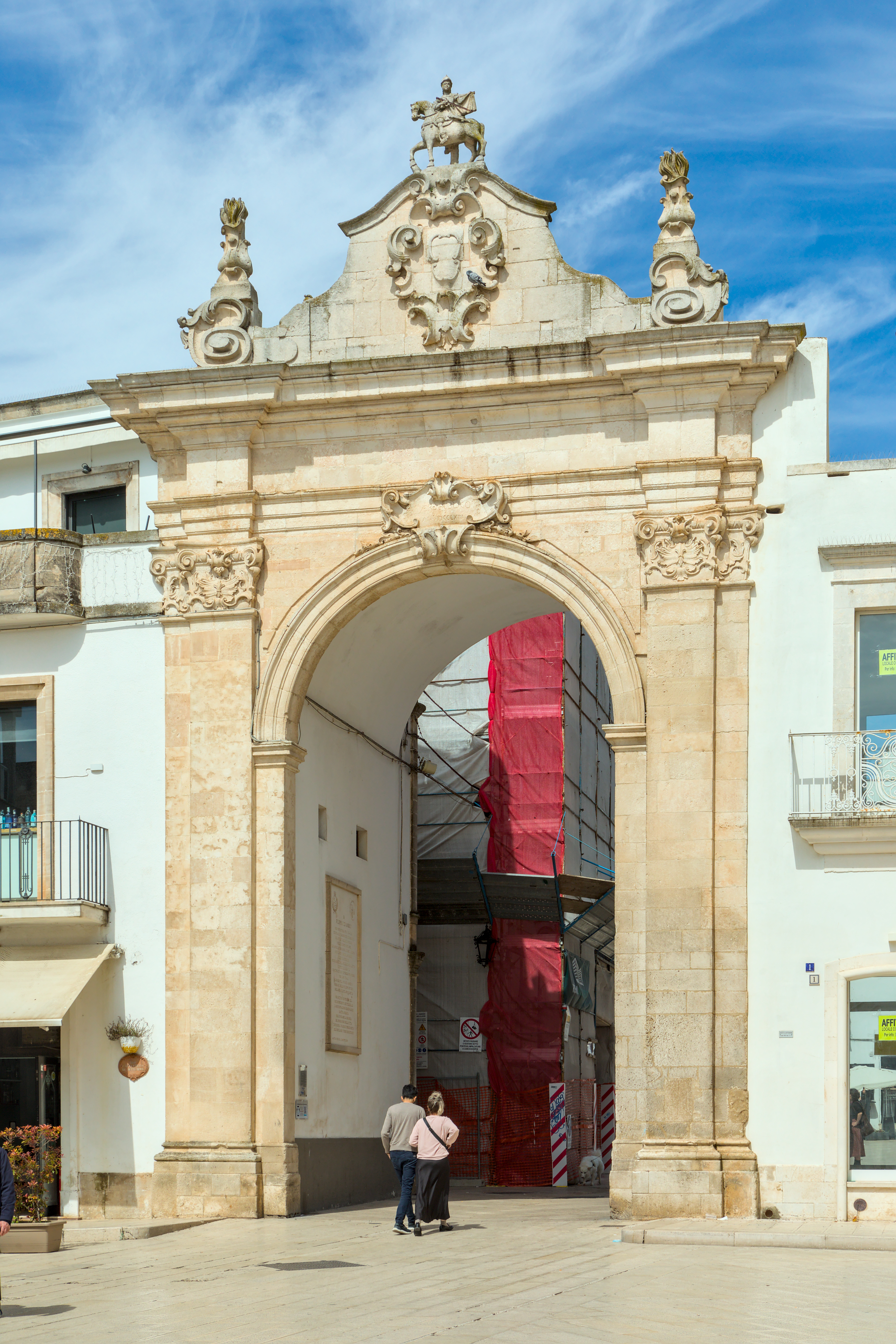
Porta di Santo Stefano, linking Piazza XX Settembre and Piazza Roma

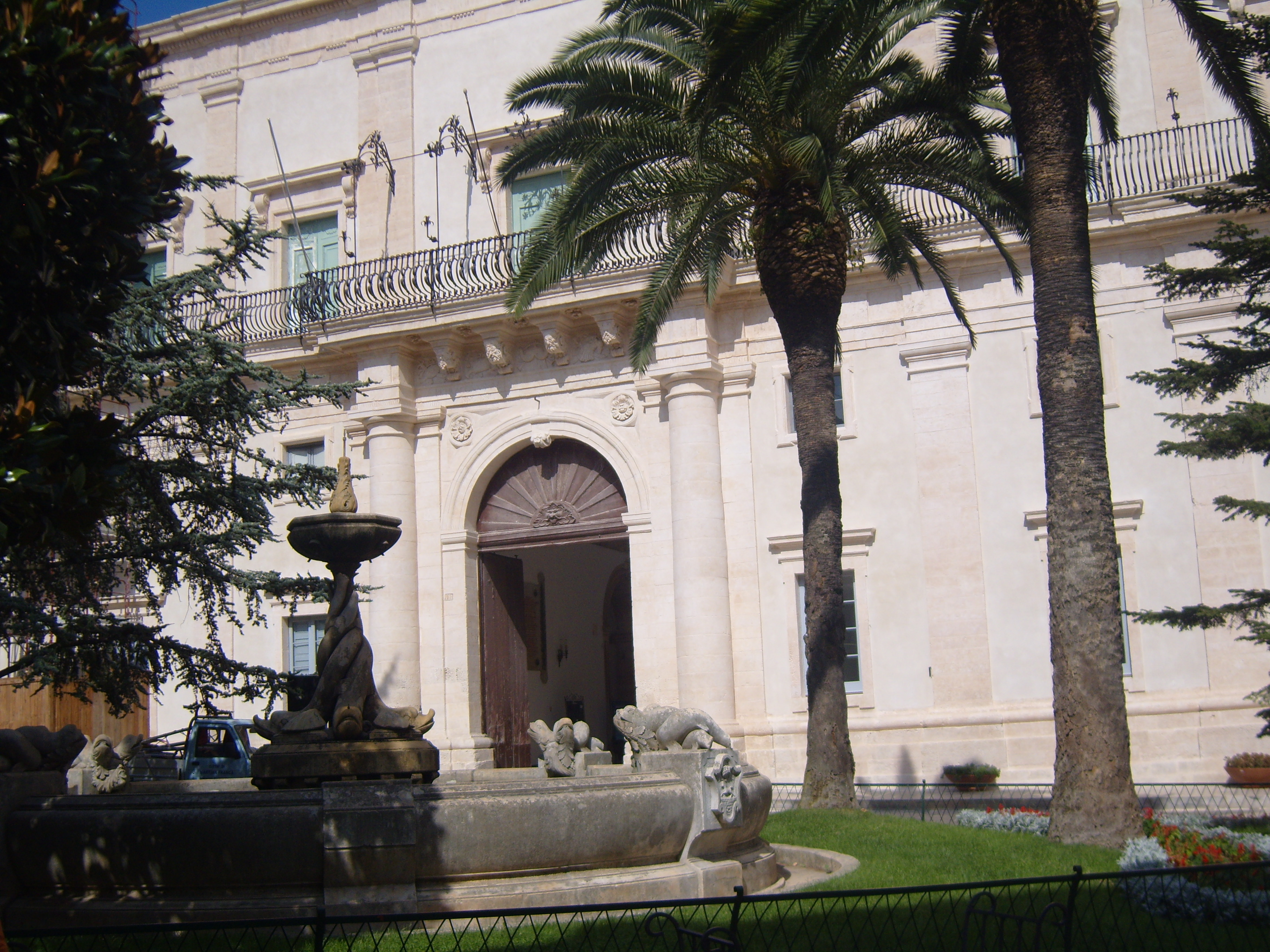
Ducal Palace in Piazza Roma

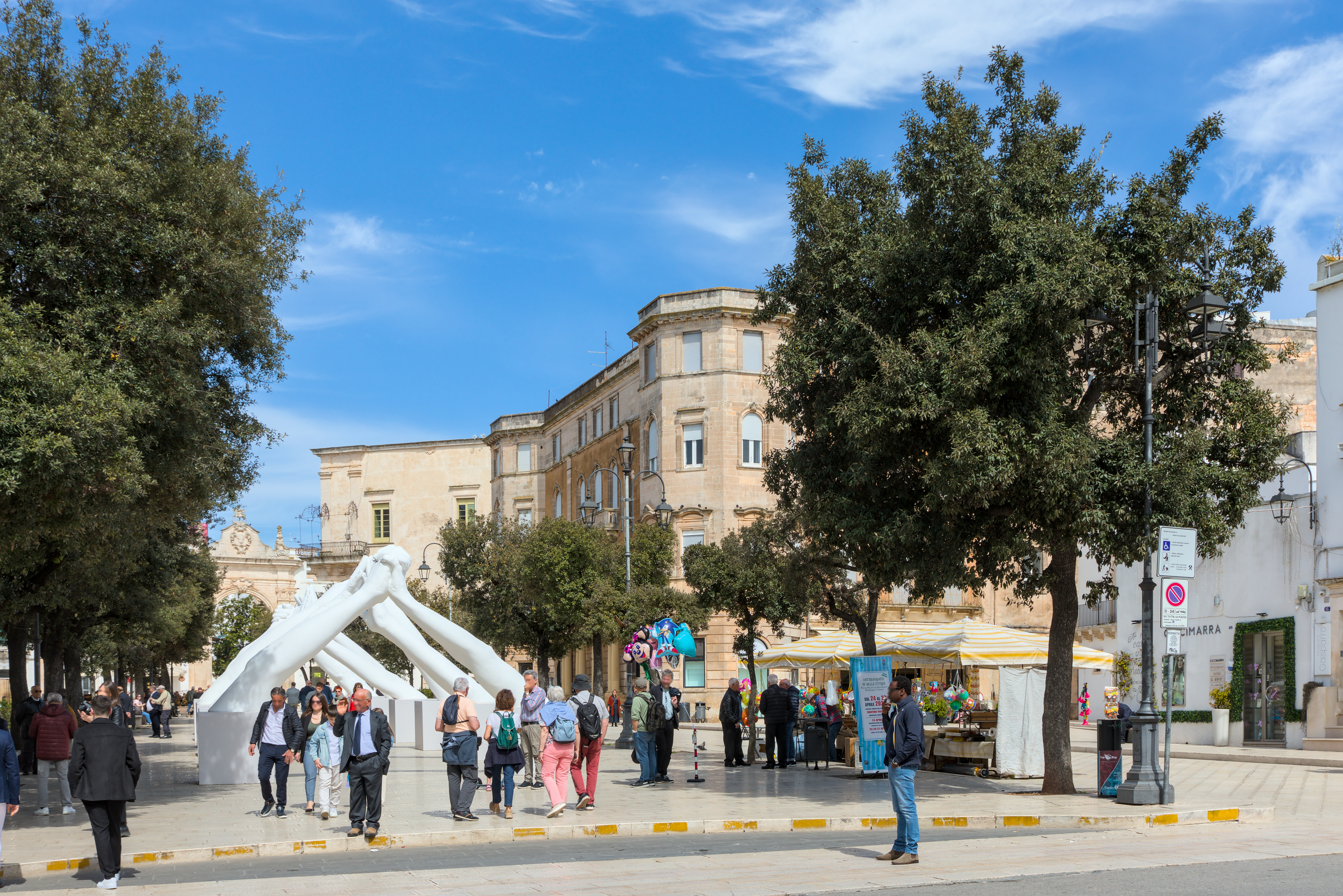
Piazza XX Settembre

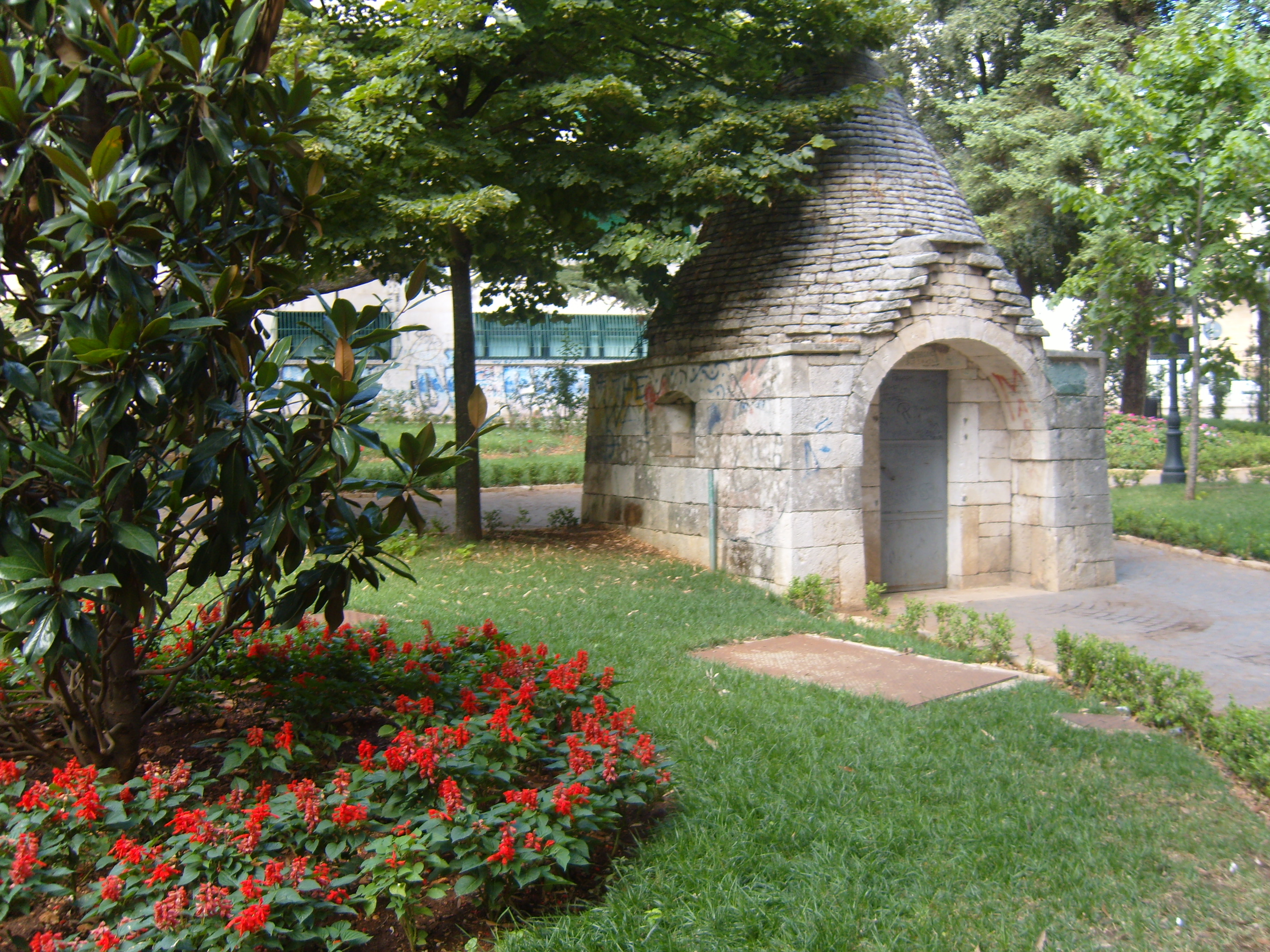
A trullo in the city park

Martina Franca, also known simply as Martina (Martinese: Marténe), is a town and municipality in the province of Taranto, Apulia, Italy. It is the second most populated town of the province after Taranto, and has a population (2016) of 49,086. Since 1975, the town has hosted the annual summer opera festival, the Festival della Valle d'Itria.

== Geography ==
Located in the Itria Valley, close to the provinces of Bari and Brindisi, Martina Franca borders with the municipalities of Alberobello (BA), Ceglie Messapica (BR), Cisternino (BR), Crispiano, Massafra, Mottola, Locorotondo (BA), Ostuni (BR), Villa Castelli (BR), Grottaglie and Noci (BA). It counts the hamlets (frazioni) of Baratta, Capitolo, Cappuccini, Carpari, Gemma, Infarinata, Lamia Vecchia, Madonna dell'Arco, Monte Fellone, Monte Ilario, Montetulio, Monti del Duca, Motolese, Nigri, Ortolini, Papadomenico, Pergolo, Pianelle, San Paolo, and Specchia Tarantina.

== Culture ==
The opera Festival della Valle d'Itria is held annually in July/August. It presents a variety of rather unusual operas.

== Economy ==
Agriculture is concentrated in fertile lands in small valleys. Viticulture is mainly focused on white grape varieties. There are many olive trees growing — olive oil is one of the main product of the area. Sheep and goats are the most common livestock. There is also the breeding of thoroughbred Murgese horses and the Martina Franca donkey. The most developed industry is textile manufacturing that made Martina famous also in the movie industry for a big international film in the '80s. The services sector includes banking, insurance and tourism, particularly enogastronomic tourism. Visitors can visit oil mills, vineyards and cellars to sample local products.

== Main sights ==
The town has a particularly conserved old town surrounded by stone walls with prominent Baroque gates leading to piazzas and narrow, winding streets. Piazza Roma is the largest square in the old town, with a green space in the centre of a largely triangular grass pattern, facing the 17th-century Palazzo Ducale.

== Gastronomy ==
=== Martina Franca DOC ===
The comune of Martina Franca produces a white Denominazione di origine controllata (DOC) Italian wine that can be made in a still or sparkling Spumante style. The wine has a tendency not to age well, often turning from a light white color to a darker amber color and losing its fresh fruit flavors after only 3 to 4 years in the bottle. All grapes destined for DOC wine production need to be harvested to a yield no greater than 13 tonnes/ha. The wine is made predominantly (50-65%) from Verdeca and Bianco d'Alessano which can make between 45-40% of the blend. Additional grapes are permitted up to a maximum of 5% including Bombino bianco, Fiano and Malvasia Toscana. The finished wine must attain a minimum alcohol level of 11% in order to be labelled with the Martina Franca DOC designation. Martina Franca is also known for its capocollo and for Bombette (Pork neck rolls stuffed with Canestrato, salt and pepper).

== Sports ==
The town's football team is the A.S. Martina Franca 1947, which are currently plays in Lega Pro. Its home ground is the Giuseppe Domenico Tursi Stadium. The Formula One driver Antonio Giovinazzi was born in Martina Franca.

The local futsal club is the LCF Martina. It was founded in 2009 and its home ground is the PalaWojtyla.

== Transport ==
Martina Franca railway station is an important junction point between the lines Bari–Martina–Taranto and Martina–Lecce, both operated by the Ferrovie del Sud Est (FSE). A minor station on the line to Taranto, Martina Franca Colonne Grassi, is located in the southwestern suburb. Another minor stop, San Paolo, serves the nearby frazione of the same name.

== References in popular culture ==
In the novel Artemis Fowl by Eoin Colfer, Martina Franca is the setting of a troll attack.

== Notable people ==
- Giuseppe Aprile (1732–1813), composer and castrato
- Rossella Brescia (born 1971), dancer and TV presenter
- Pietro Carbotti, Venerable
- Domenico Carella (1721–1813), painter
- Donato Carrisi (born 1973), thriller writer
- Gioconda de Vito (1907–1994), violinist
- Mario Desiati (born 1977), novelist who grew up in Martina Franca
- Matteo Fischetti (1830–1887), pianist and composer
- Antonio Giovinazzi (born 1993), racing driver for Ferrari AF Corse
- Paolo Grassi (Milan, 1919 – London, 1981), founder of the Piccolo Teatro di Milano and director of the Teatro alla Scala
- Cosimo Damiano Lanza (Leporano, 1962), pianist, harpsichordist and composer. Director of the Accademia Musicale Mediterranea in Martina Franca.
- Renzo Rubino (born 1988, Taranto), singer-songwriter, raised by parents of Martina Franca
- Aldo Semerari (1923–1982), criminologist and suspected neo-fascist terrorist, who was born in Martina Franca
- Richard Sinclair (born 1948, Canterbury), English progressive rock musician, who lives in the countryside of Martina
- Rudolph Valentino (Castellaneta, 1895 – New York City, 1936), American actor. His father came from Martina Franca.

== See also ==
- Ghironda Festival, established in 1995
- Itria Valley

== Sources ==
- Jewish Virtual Library
- C. Colafemmina, Gli ebrei a Taranto (2005)
- N. Ferorelli, Gli Ebrei nell’Italia meridionale, dall’età romana al secolo XVIII
