= Putignano =

- Comune
- Comune di Putignano
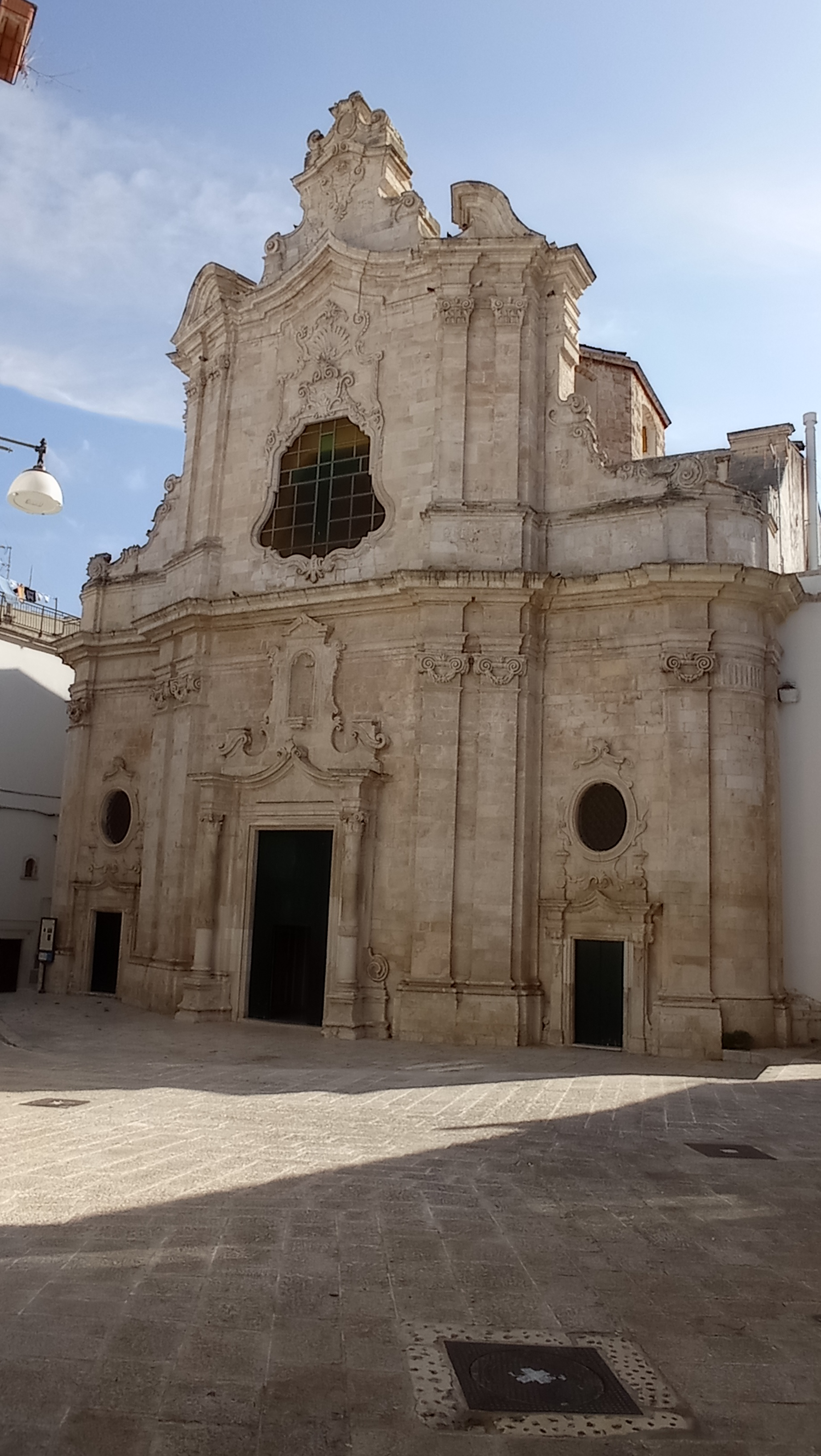

- Coat of arms

- Location within Italy Location within Apulia
- Coordinates: 40°51′N 17°7′E
- Country: Italy
- Region: Apulia
- Metropolitan city: Bari (BA)
- Frazioni: Bacano, Chiancarosa, Gorgo di Mola, Marchione, Parco Grande, San Michele, San Michele in Monte Laureto, San Pietro Piturno

Government
  - Mayor: Michele Vinella

Area
  - Total: 99.11 km^{2} (38.27 sq mi)
- Elevation: 372 m (1,220 ft)

Population (31 December 2010)
  - Total: 27,394
  - Density: 276.4/km^{2} (715.9/sq mi)
- Demonym: Putignanesi
- Time zone: UTC+1 (CET)
  - Summer (DST): UTC+2 (CEST)
- Postal code: 70017
- Dialing code: 080
- Patron saint: Saint Stephen
- Saint day: 3 August
- Website: Official website

Putignano (Barese: Putignàane) is a town and comune of the Metropolitan City of Bari, in Apulia, southern Italy. Located in the Murge area, it is known for its ancient Carnival, for textile manufacturing companies and for karst caves.

== Geography ==
Putignano rises in a hilly position in the Murgia of trulli and caves, at an altitude of 372 m s.l.m. The territory, which covers an area of 99.11 km^{2} and has an altitude of between 293 and 456 m asl, is morphologically made up of a series of terraces composed of layers of limestone positioned on irregular levels.

== Origin of the name ==
There are various conjectures around the origin of the toponym:

- from Potamos (river), because the city was in ancient times crossed by a canal from the ancient center of Frassineto, near Gioia del Colle;
- from Puteus insanus (pit that makes folle) or from Puteus janus, because of the ancient custom of depositing the must in the country cisterns;
- from Apollo Pithunis (slayer of the snake Python) from which Pethunianum derives. This is due to the alleged presence of a sanctuary of Apollo inside a cave near Monte Laureto, a high hill in the Agro putignanese;
- from Pytna, ancient center of the island of Crete, from which an ancient tribe is thought to have lived in the territory in ancient times;
- from puteus, due to the large quantity of wells present in the territory;
- from an ancient noble name, Potinius, Putinius, from which the Latin form Putinianum would have derived.

== History ==
Putignano originated from an ancient Peuceta center. There are numerous archaeological finds such as vases, coins, weapons, found in ancient burials. It is conceivable, in the absence of further evidence, that it prospered during the age of Magna Graecia, until it subsequently became a Roman municipium. The center decayed over the centuries.

Around the year 1000 the territory of Putignano became the property of the Benedictine monks who resided in the Abbey of Santo Stefano di Monopoli. Since then small families of peasants began to live in the territory of Putignano in the service of the Benedictines. Over the years the population progressively increased, so that a small agricultural center was born, which developed over the centuries.

The Benedictine domination dates back to some events concerning Frederick II of Swabia. He loved to hunt in the territories of Bari, in fact he also had a residence in Gioia del Colle. Putignano was also dear to him, so much so that he had a castle built immediately outside the town. Preparing to enter the city, the people of Putignano denied him access, on the advice of the Benedictines, siding with the Pope who had excommunicated the emperor. From then on his love for the city became hatred for the infidelity he suffered, destroying the castle, of which today no trace remains and severely ruining the walls.

The fights of the bishop of Conversano were added to the fury of Frederick II to obtain spiritual jurisdiction over the territory. However, for a long period of time, Putignano enjoyed (as happened in the nearby city of Rutigliano) the status of ecclesia nullius diocesis, that is it did not belong to any diocese and was under the direct dependence of the Holy See.

In 1317, due to some disagreements between the Benedictine monks, he handed Putignano into the hands of the order of the Knights of Jerusalem. The feud was declared a slave and whoever obtained the investiture was called Balì and had temporal and spiritual power. In this period the Adriatic coast was the victim of Turkish raids. For this reason it was decided to transfer a Byzantine icon with the effigy of the Virgin and the relics of Santo Stefano from the Abbey of Santo Stefano in Monopoli in safer territories. Putignano was chosen, where a church was built for the conservation of these objects. It is also said that on the occasion of the procession for the transfer of the relics the Propaggini celebrations originated, the opening event of the Putignano Carnival.

The period of greatest splendor lived under the dominion of the Gerosolimitani or Cavalieri di Malta, was that of the Balì Carafa government. In 1472 he had a new wall built to replace the old one damaged by Frederick II. He built it larger and more imposing, with 14 round towers and 12 quadrangles, surrounded by a large moat. It also allowed the opening of a second door, Porta Barsento, in addition to the existing Porta Grande. In 1477 he completed another great work. He rebuilt the Church of San Pietro Apostolo, building it much larger and giving it a great artistic and architectural value. It was in fact the first church built in Putignano and had become small and decadent, because it dates back to the period of the first peasant nucleus of the year 1000. During the seventeenth century Putignano developed notably, becoming an important agricultural center and accumulating great wealth and works of art, kept in the numerous churches of the city and in the many convents established. At the end of the eighteenth century, however, even Putignano was victim of the requisitions of property of the French, who carried away all the church bells (except the largest of the church of San Pietro, still existing today) and numerous paintings and sacred furnishings.

In 1806, three olms were planted by the French in Putignano in memory of the ideas of democracy and freedom. Of these, one is still in existence today. In the Risorgimento numerous people from Putignano joined the Garibaldi Thousand, including Captain Francesco Saverio Tateo, one of the insurgents of Villa Glori. After the unification of Italy, Putignano grew and developed. During the fascist dictatorship it was visited twice by Prince Umberto II of Savoy, a friend of the Romanazzi-Carducci family, a noble Putignanese family. Putignano reached its full development during the fifties and sixties, in which the development of the textile industry flourished and the Carnival took its current form. In addition, numerous infrastructures were built, including the hospital, which made Putignano one of the main centers of south-eastern Bari.

== Events ==
=== Carnival ===
The Putignano Carnival is the best known of Southern Italy but also the oldest in Europe. Its first edition dates back to 1394. The Putignano Carnival is one of the longest in duration. It starts on December 26 with the Propaggini event. It recalls the arrival in Putignano of the relics of Santo Stefano from the abbey of Monopoli. On this day, the Putignanesi perform in theatricals in the vernacular, accusing and mocking local authorities about the problems of the country that have remained unresolved.

Then there are the carnival Thursdays, there are seven of them and they are counted starting from January 17 (Feast of Sant'Antonio Abate). Every Thursday is dedicated to every category of the Putignano population, which is called to celebrate the carnival, so we have Thursday: Monsignori, priests, nuns, widows and widows, Pazzi (single boys), married women, of the Cornuti (married men).

The most important is that of the Cornuti, as it reminds the population that the carnival is about to end. During the horned Thursday, the "Accademia delle Corna" elects the "Great Horned of the Year" among the leading members of the population. The carnival ends on Shrove Tuesday, with the last evening parade and the carnival funeral. Famous are the papier-mâché giants, generically called "allegorical carts"; they parade during the four carnival parades, generally held on a Sunday, except on Shrove Tuesday.

== Monuments and places of interest ==
=== Religious architectures ===
- Chiesa di Santa Maria La Greca e di Santo Stefano protomartire e patrono con la reliquia del cranio di S.Stefano e consacrata il 28 aprile 1522;
- Chiesa di Santa Maria di Costantinopoli;
- Convento delle Carmelitane e annessa chiesa;
- Chiesa di San Lorenzo e Madonna del Pozzo;
- Cappella del Purgatorio;
- Chiesa della Maddalena;
- Grotta di San Michele in Monte Laureto (in periferia);
- Chiesa di Santo Stefano Piccolo;
- Chiesa rupestre della Madonna delle Grazie;
- Chiesa dei SS. Cosma e Damiano e di S.Irene;
- Cappella di San Biagio Vescovo (in periferia);
- Monastero e Chiesa di Santa Chiara;
- Chiesa di San Pietro Piturno;
- Cappella di Pin Pen;
- Chiesa dei Cappuccini.

=== Others ===
- Principe Guglielmo Romanazzi Carducci Civic Museum of Santo Mauro
- Civic Museum of the sculptor Giuseppe Albano
- War Memorial
- Bust of Vincenzo Petruzzi
- Bust of Cesare Contegiacomo - sculptor Giuseppe Albano from Putignano -
- Monument to the fallen of Nassirya
- Bust of Pietro Mezzapesa

== Languages and dialects ==
The Putignanese dialect is a variant of the Bari lineage and how this is characterized by linguistic sedimentation due to the dominations that followed one another over the centuries. Conspicuous is the presence of words of Greek origin, acquired during the period of the Magna Graecia and during the later Byzantine domination:

Ceras (cherry), derives from εράσιον; Panar (wicker basket), derives from Παναριον; Grast (vase with plant), derives from γράστις, which means grass; Zeit (boyfriends), comes from Ζυγή, which means pair, couple.

== Movie set ==
Putignano was chosen as the setting for the fiction The General of the Brigands (2012) by Paolo Poeti. Some scenes were shot in the Palazzo del Balì.

== Economy ==
In the past, the economy of the city was principally based on agriculture, but in more recent times the population has transformed it into an industrial centre. Numerous families have founded companies in industries such as food production (taralli are one example) and the manufacture of dresses for wedding and children's religious functions.

== Culture ==
Putignano is well known for its Carnival, which is the oldest (dating to 1394) and longest-lasting Italian carnival, as it starts the day after Christmas and finishes the day before Ash Wednesday. There are four Carnival parades, three taking place on the last month's Sundays and one in the evening of the last day of carnival, Shrove Tuesday. As of 2005, the Carnival Foundation added a summer parade that usually takes place in July.

The name of the city has also been given to an asteroid of this solar system, 7665 Putignano.

== Transport ==
The town is served by Putignano railway station, with regional services to Bari and Martina Franca.

== Services ==
In this town there is a big high school that offers three different orientations specializing students in:

- classical subjects
- scientific subjects
- languages
