= Bari–Martina Franca–Taranto railway =

Railway line in Italy

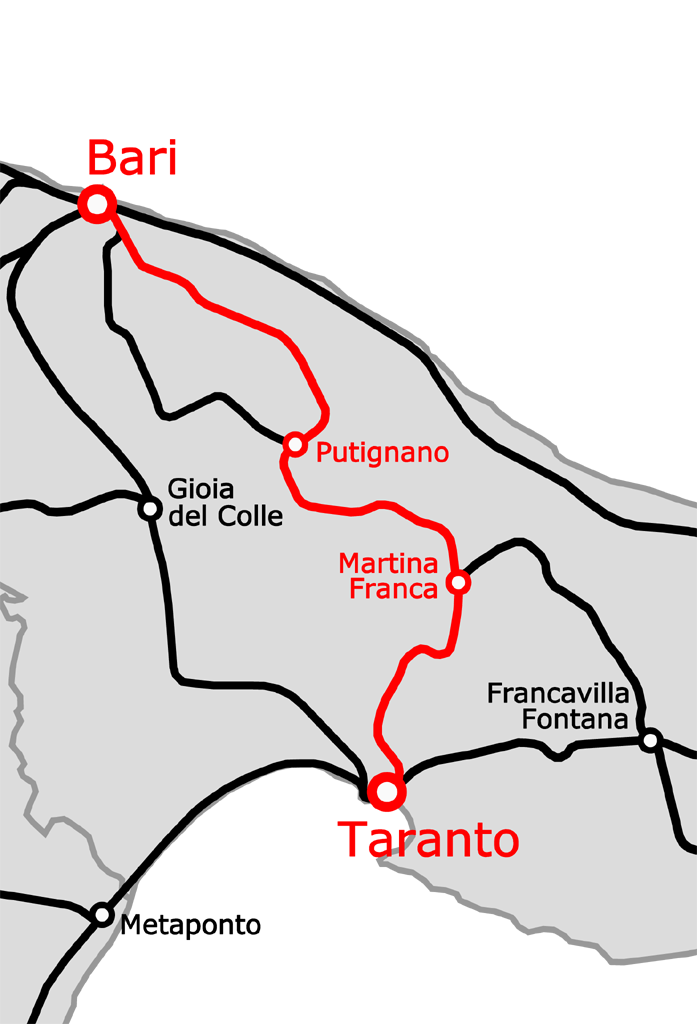

Overview
- Status: in use
- Owner: RFI
- Locale: Italy
- Termini: Bari; Taranto

Service
- Type: Heavy rail
- Operator(s): Ferrovie del Sud Est

History
- Opened: 1900

Technical
- Line length: 113 km (70 mi)
- Number of tracks: 1
- Track gauge: 1,435 mm (4 ft 8 1/2 in) standard gauge

The Bari–Martina Franca–Taranto railway is a 113-kilometre (70 mi) long Italian railway line, that connects Bari with Putignano, Martina Franca and further to Taranto.

The line was opened in three stages between 1900 and 1931. On 12 August 1900 the section from Bari to Putignano opened, the line was further extended on 14 December 1903 to Locorotondo. On 24 December 1925 the line opened between Locorotondo and Martina Franca and finally from Martina Franca to Taranto on 22 April 1931.

== Usage ==
The line is used by the following service(s):

- Local services (Treno regionale) Bari - Conversano - Putignano - Martina Franca
- Local services (Treno regionale) Bari - Casamassima - Putignano (between Bari Centrale and Bari Mungivacca)
- Local services (Treno regionale) Martina Franca - Taranto

== Electrification ==
The railway is being electrified, largely with funds from the European Union, with most works completed in 2014. The FSE has requested a tender for four trains.

== See also ==
- List of railway lines in Italy
