= Ferrovie del Sud Est =

Italian railway company

Ferrovie del Sud Est e Servizi Automobilistici S.r.l. (FSE)
- Company type: Public benefit corporation, Limited company
- Industry: Transport
- Founded: 1931
- Headquarters: Bari, Italy
- Area served: Province of Bari Province of Taranto Province of Lecce
- Products: Rail transport Bus transport
- Website: www.fseonline.it

Ferrovie del Sud Est (FSE) is a railway company in Apulia region, Italy. The company operates in the comuni south of Lecce and in the provinces of Bari, Brindisi and Taranto. The company also operates bus lines. In August 2016 its network was taken over by Ferrovie dello stato due to financial problems at the company. The company is now wholly owned by the Italian Transport Ministry.

== Geography ==
The interior of Salento is a relatively flat plateau, which, however, slopes steeply down to the coasts of the Adriatic Sea and the Gulf of Taranto. The coast itself was very marshy, malarial and uninhabitable. Except for a few port cities, such as Bari, Otranto, Gallipoli and Taranto, all settlements are therefore located inland. Thus, the FSE routes only lead to the sea in the seaports mentioned and otherwise run in the interior of Apulia. The draining of the marshy coast only started in the 1930s. In recent years, large-scale seaside tourism has developed there, for which the railway runs much too far inland.

== Lines ==
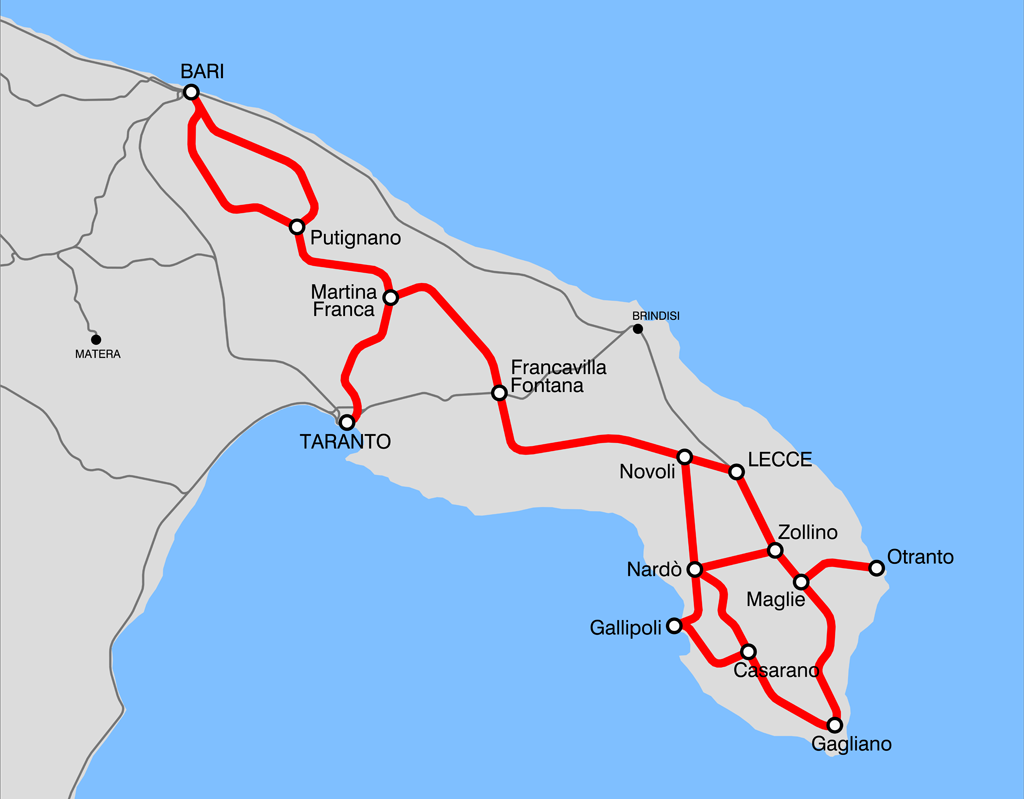
Red: Ferrovie del Sud Est network Black: Ferrovie dello Stato network

FSE operates trains on the following routes:

- Linea 1 Bari–Martina Franca–Taranto railway and Bari-Casamassima-Putignano railway
- Linea 2 Martina Franca–Lecce railway
- Linea 3 Novoli-Gagliano del Capo railway
- Linea 4 Gallipoli–Casarano railway
- Linea 5 Zollino–Gallipoli railway
- Linea 6 Maglie–Gagliano del Capo railway
- Linea 7 Lecce–Otranto railway

== Fleet ==
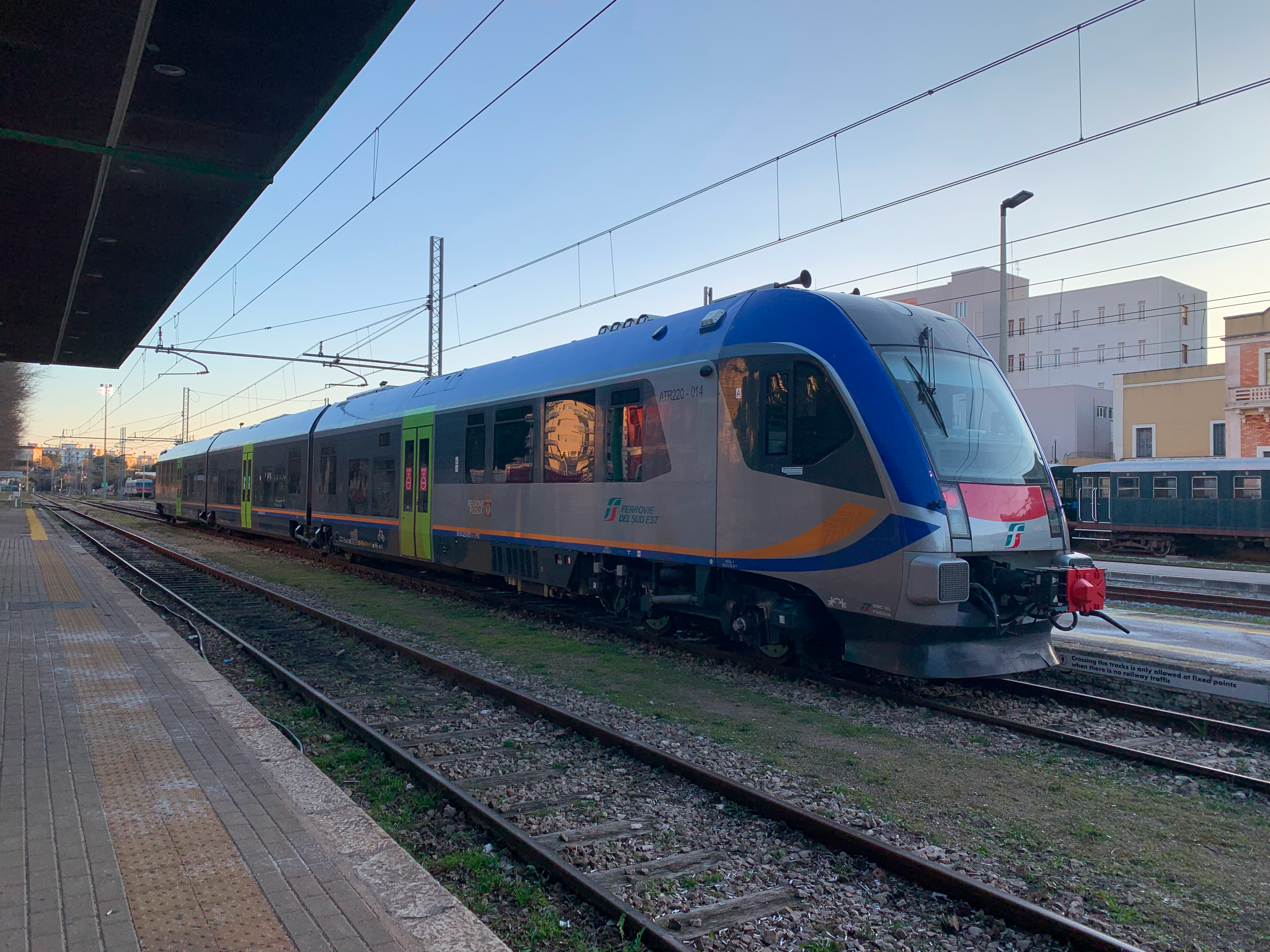
An ATR 220 of Ferrovie del Sud Est

=== Current fleet ===
Class	Image	Cars per set	Type	Top speed		Number	Builder	Built	In service
Class	Image	Cars per set	Type	km/h	mph	Number	Builder	Built	In service
DE.122		N/A	Diesel locomotive	100	62	8	IMPA, ITIN, DPA	1987-1989, 2006-2009	yes
BB.150		N/A	Diesel locomotive	80	50	13	Reggiane, Marelli	1958-1960	no
D.343		N/A	Diesel locomotive	130	81	3	OM, Sofer, O.ME.CA.	1967-1970	no
D.752		N/A	Diesel locomotive	100	62	2	CKD	1973-1976	no
Ad 31-45		1	Diesel multiple unit	103	64	15	Fiat Ferroviaria, O.ME.CA.	1978-1979	yes
Ad 51-80		1	Diesel multiple unit	120	75	30	Breda, Aerfer	1958-1960	no
Ad 81-88		2	Diesel multiple unit	150	93	4	Fiat Ferroviaria	1999-2000	no
Ad 121-130		2	Diesel multiple unit	114	71	5	Fiat Ferroviaria	1956-1963	no
ATR 200		2	Diesel multiple unit	120	75	3	Stadler	1996-1997	no
Pesa Atribo ATR 220		3	Diesel multiple unit	130	81	27	Pesa SA	2008-2011	yes
Newag Impuls ETR 322		3	Electric multiple unit	160	99	11	Newag	2016-2021	yes
Alstom Coradia ETR 104		4	Electric multiple unit	160	99	9	Alstom	2024-	yes

=== Former fleet ===
Class	Image	Cars per set	Type	Top speed		Number	Builder	Built	In service
Class	Image	Cars per set	Type	km/h	mph	Number	Builder	Built	In service
Ad 01-10		1	Diesel multiple unit	88	55	10	MAN SE, OMS	1939-1952	1939-1996

== See also ==
- Bari Centrale railway station
- Transportation in Italy
