= Bari Centrale railway station =

Railway station in Bari, Italy

Bari Centrale
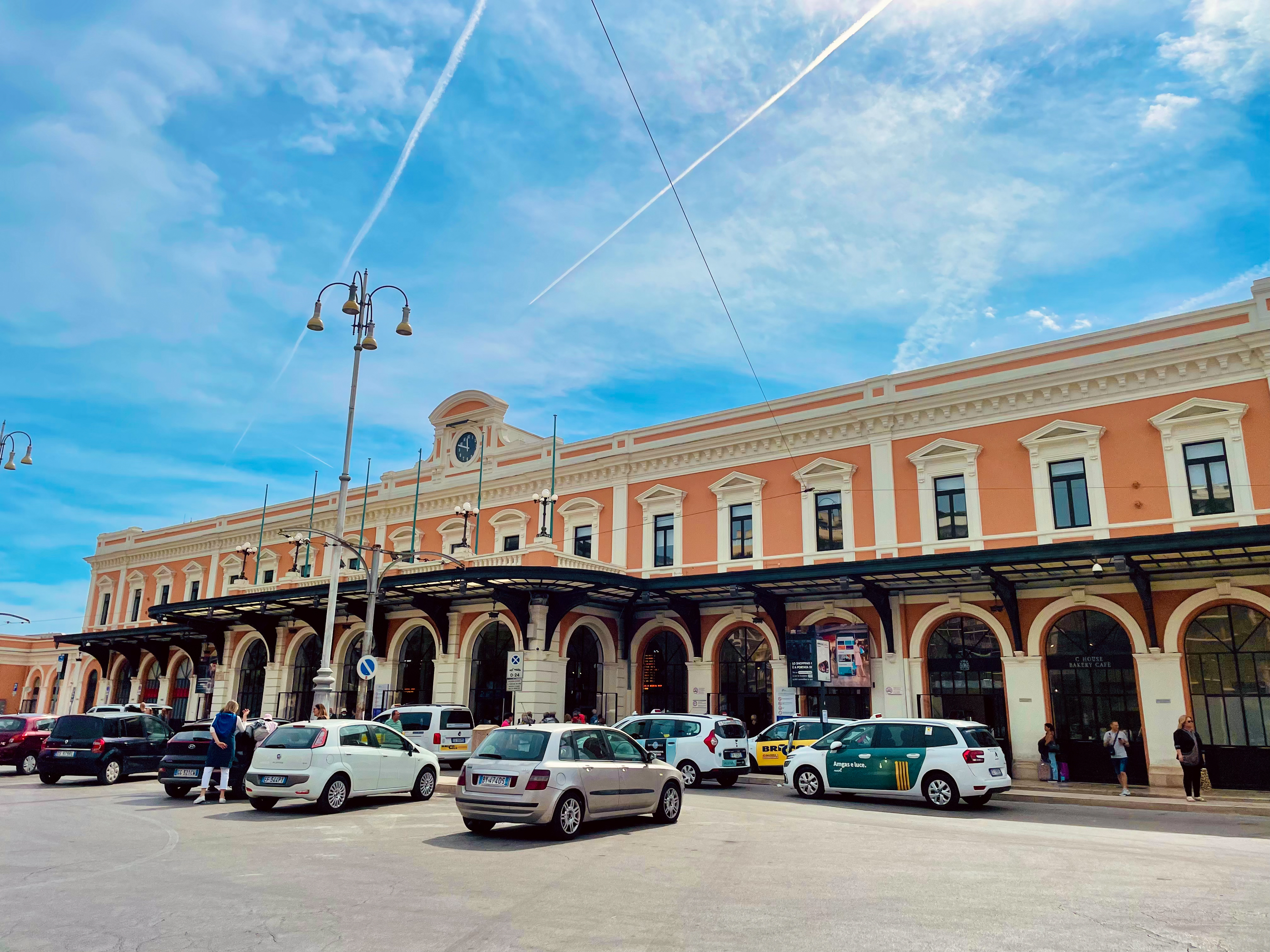
- Station façade

General information
- Location: Piazza Aldo Moro; 70122 Bari; Province of Bari, Apulia; Italy
- Coordinates: 41°07′05″N 16°52′12″E
- Owner: Rete Ferroviaria Italiana
- Operator: Grandi Stazioni
- Lines: Ancona–Lecce (Trenitalia); Bari–Taranto (Trenitalia); Bari–Bitritto (Trenitalia); Bari–Martina Franca–Taranto (FSE); Bari–Barletta railway (Ferrotramviaria); Bari–San Paolo railway (Ferrotramviaria); Bari–Matera railway (Ferrovie Appulo Lucane)
- Platforms: 20
- Train operators: Trenitalia; Ferrovie del Sud Est; Ferrotramviaria; Ferrovie Appulo Lucane
- Connections: Urban and suburban buses

History
- Opened: 1864; 162 years ago

Services
Preceding station	Trenitalia	Following station
Barletta towards Milano Centrale or Venezia Santa Lucia	Frecciarossa	Monopoli towards Lecce
Barletta towards Milano Centrale	Frecciarossa	Gioia del Colle towards Taranto
Barletta towards Roma Termini	Frecciarossa	Brindisi towards Lecce
Barletta towards Roma Termini	Frecciargento	Terminus
Molfetta towards Milano Centrale or Milano Porta Garibaldi	InterCity; Milan–Lecce	Polignano a Mare towards Lecce
Molfetta towards Roma Termini	InterCity; Rome–Taranto	Gioia del Colle towards Taranto
Terminus	InterCity; Reggio Calabria–Bari/Lecce	Gioia del Colle towards Reggio Calabria Centrale
Molfetta towards Milano Centrale	InterCity Notte; Milan–Lecce	Gioia del Colle towards Lecce
Molfetta towards Torino Porta Nuova	InterCity Notte; Turin–Lecce	Polignano a Mare towards Lecce
Terminus	Regionale Veloce; Bari–Lecce	Bari Torre a Mare towards Lecce
Bari Zona Industriale towards Foggia	Regionale; Foggia–Bari	Terminus
Bari Zona Industriale towards Barletta	Regionale; Barletta–Fasano	Marconi towards Fasano
Terminus	Regionale; Bari–Lecce	Marconi towards Lecce
Terminus	Regionale; Bari–Taranto	Bari Villaggio Lavoratore towards Taranto
Bari Santa Rita towards Bitritto	Regionale; Bitritto–Bari	Terminus
Preceding station	Ferrovie del Sud Est	Following station
Terminus	Regionale; Bari–Putignano	Bari Sud Est towards Putignano
Location
- Location within Apulia Location within Italy

Bari Centrale is the main railway station of the Italian city of Bari, capital of Apulia. It is one of the most important railway stations in Italy, with an annual ridership of 14 million.

== History ==
The station was first built in 1864 and between 1865 and 1906 5 more platforms were added. In the first half of the 20th century it was further enlarged and renewed and in 1946, after World War II, the most recent renovation project was started.

== Structure and transport ==
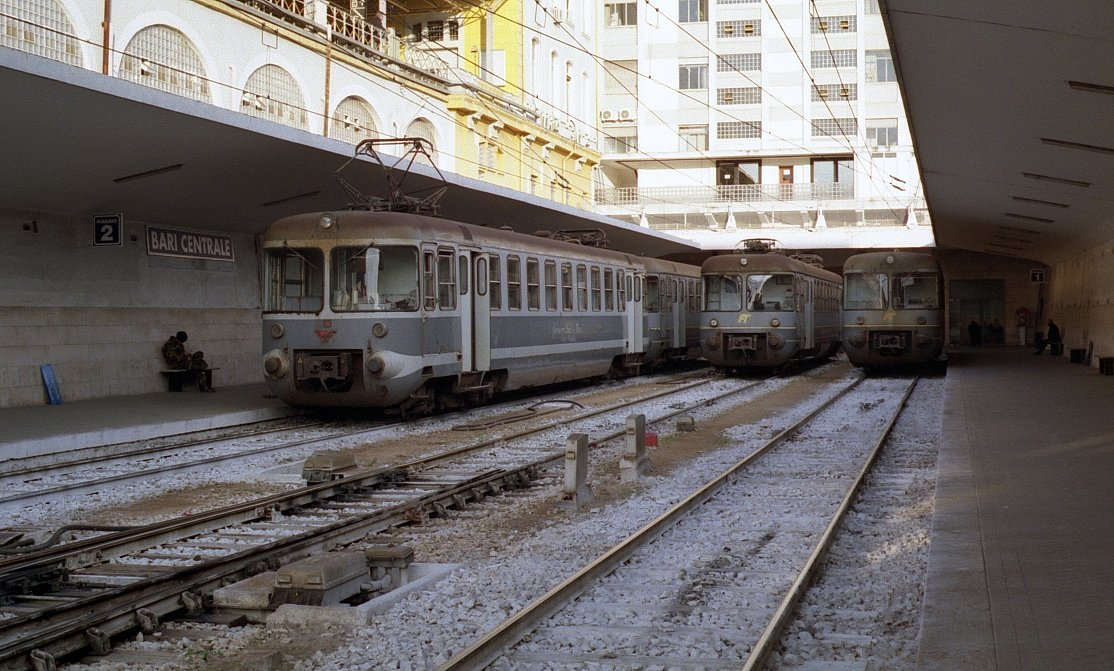
Bari Centrale, 2002

Bari Centrale lies in the middle of the city, at Aldo Moro square (Piazza Aldo Moro). It is a large junction station with 16 platforms for passenger service (13 for FS trains, 3 for FSE).

The station is situated on the lines Ancona–Pescara–Bari–Lecce (FS), Bari–Taranto (FS), and Bari–Martina Franca–Taranto (FSE).

The station is divided into three areas. The main station is used by Trenitalia and FSE and comprises 16 platforms. On the west side of Piazza Aldo Moro are the entrances to the Ferrotramviaria and Ferrovie Appulo Lucane stations, with three and two platforms respectively.

The Centrale is an important transportation hub for the Apulia regional services. For long-distance transport it is served by Le Frecce (Frecciargento and Frecciabianca), InterCity and Express trains to Rome, Milan, Bologna, Turin and Venice.

Until 1994 it was served by the express "Parthenon" Athens–Paris.

== Train services ==
The station is served by the following services:

- High speed services (Frecciarossa) Milan–Bologna–Ancona–Pescara–Foggia–Bari
- High speed services (Frecciargento) Rome–Foggia–Bari–Brindisi–Lecce
- High speed services (Frecciabianca) Milan–Parma–Bologna–Ancona–Pescara–Foggia–Bari–Brindisi–Lecce
- High speed services (Frecciabianca) Milan–Parma–Bologna–Ancona–Pescara–Foggia–Bari–Taranto
- High speed services (Frecciabianca) Turin–Parma–Bologna–Ancona–Pescara–Foggia–Bari–Brindisi–Lecce
- High speed services (Frecciabianca) Venice–Padua–Bologna–Ancona–Pescara–Foggia–Bari–Brindisi–Lecce
- Intercity services Rome–Foggia–Bari (- Taranto)
- Intercity services Bologna–Rimini–Ancona–Pescara–Foggia–Bari–Brindisi–Lecce
- Intercity services Bologna–Rimini–Ancona–Pescara–Foggia–Bari–Taranto
- Night train (Intercity Notte) Rome–Foggia–Bari–Brindisi–Lecce
- Night train (Intercity Notte) Milan–Parma–Bolgona–Ancona–Pescara–Foggia–Bari–Brindisi–Lecce
- Night train (Intercity Notte) Milan–Ancona–Pescara–Foggia–Bari–Taranto–Brindisi–Lecce
- Night train (Intercity Notte) Turin–Alessandria–Bolgona–Ancona–Pescara–Foggia–Bari–Brindisi–Lecce
- Regional services (Treno regionale) Bari–Brindisi–Lecce
- Regional services (Treno regionale) Foggia–Barletta–Bari
- Local services (Treno regionale) Bari–Gioia del Colle–Taranto
- Local services (Treno regionale) Bari–Conversano–Putignano–Martina Franca
- Local services (Treno regionale) Bari–Casamassima–Putignano
- Local services (Treno regionale) Bari–Altamura–Gravina–Potenza
- Local services (Treno regionale) Bari–Altamura–Matera
- Bari Metropolitan services (FR1) Bitonto–Palese–Bari
- Bari Metropolitan services (FR2) Barletta–Andria–Bitonto–Aeroporto–Bari
- Bari Metropolitan services (FM1) Ospedale–Bari
- Bari Metropolitan services (FM2) Bitonto–Aeroporto–Bari

== Bus services ==
- 100 Bari–Valenzano–Adelfia–Putignano–Alberobello–Martina Franca
- 110 Bari–Casamassima–Gioia del Colle–Taranto
- 120 Bari–Triggiano–Capurso–Cellamare–Casamassima–Sammichele
- 130 Bari–Conversano–Putignano–Noci–Taranto
- 150 Bari–Monopoli–Fasano–Brindisi

== Gallery ==
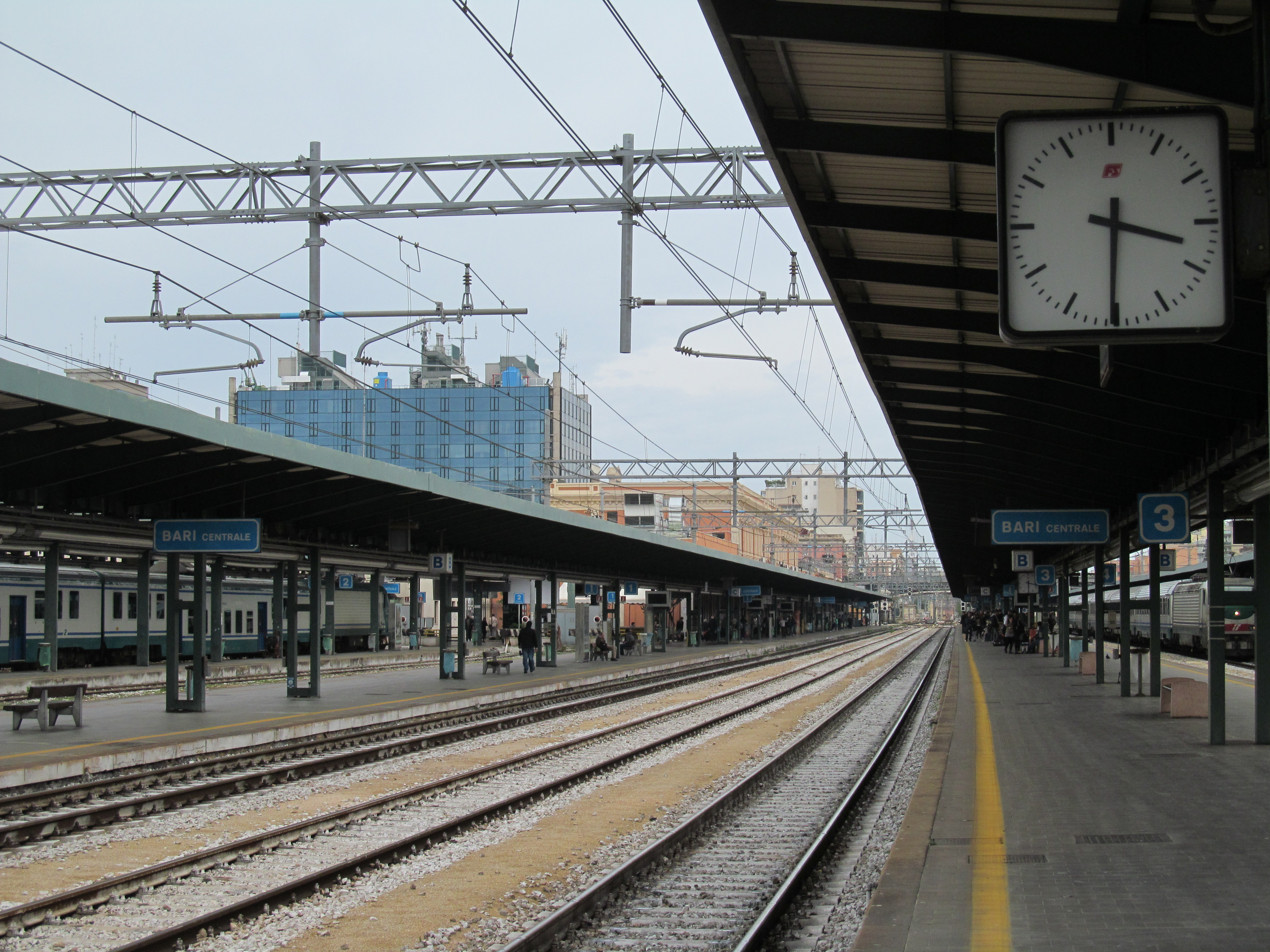
A view of the main station

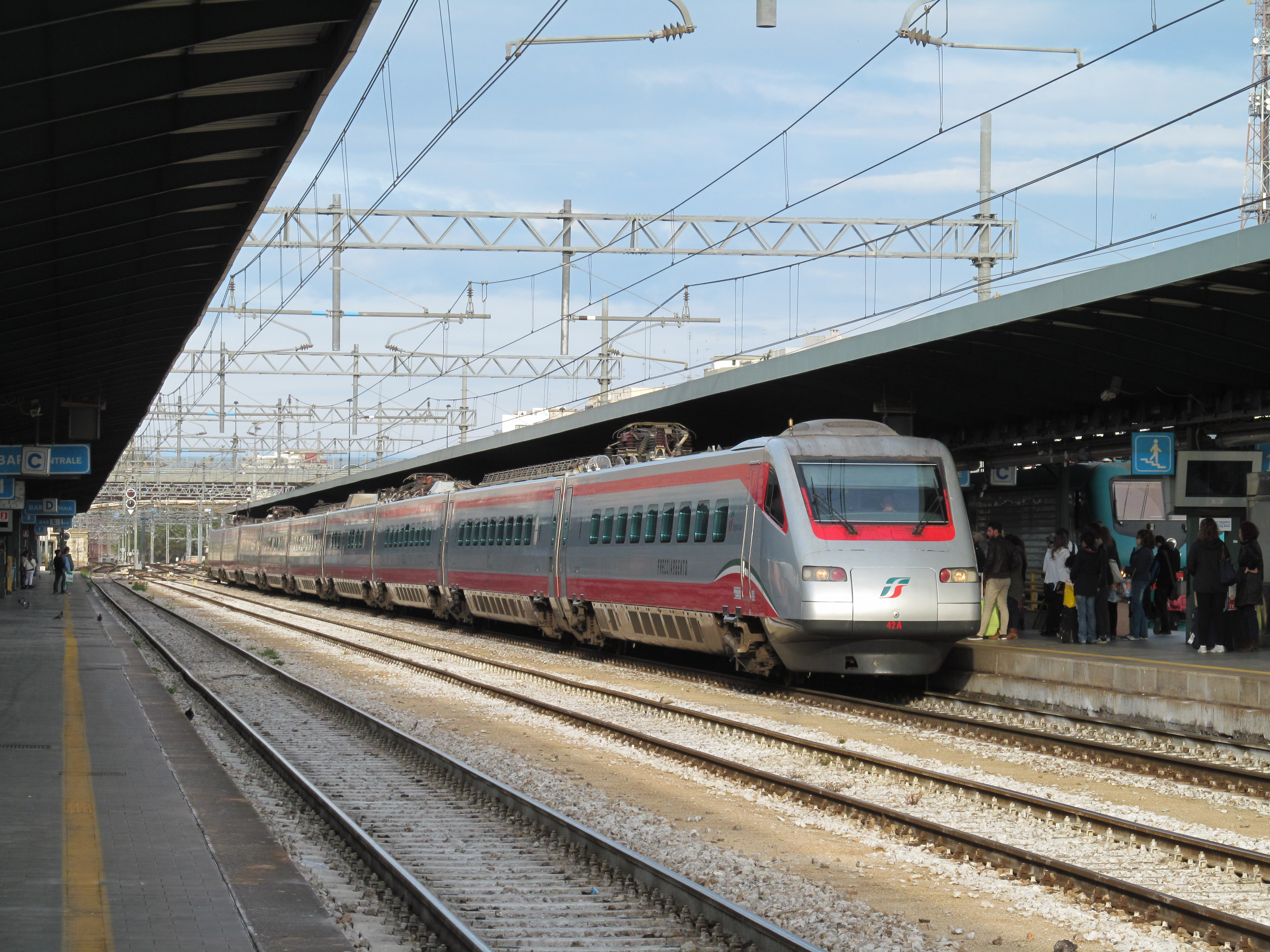
A Frecciargento at the station

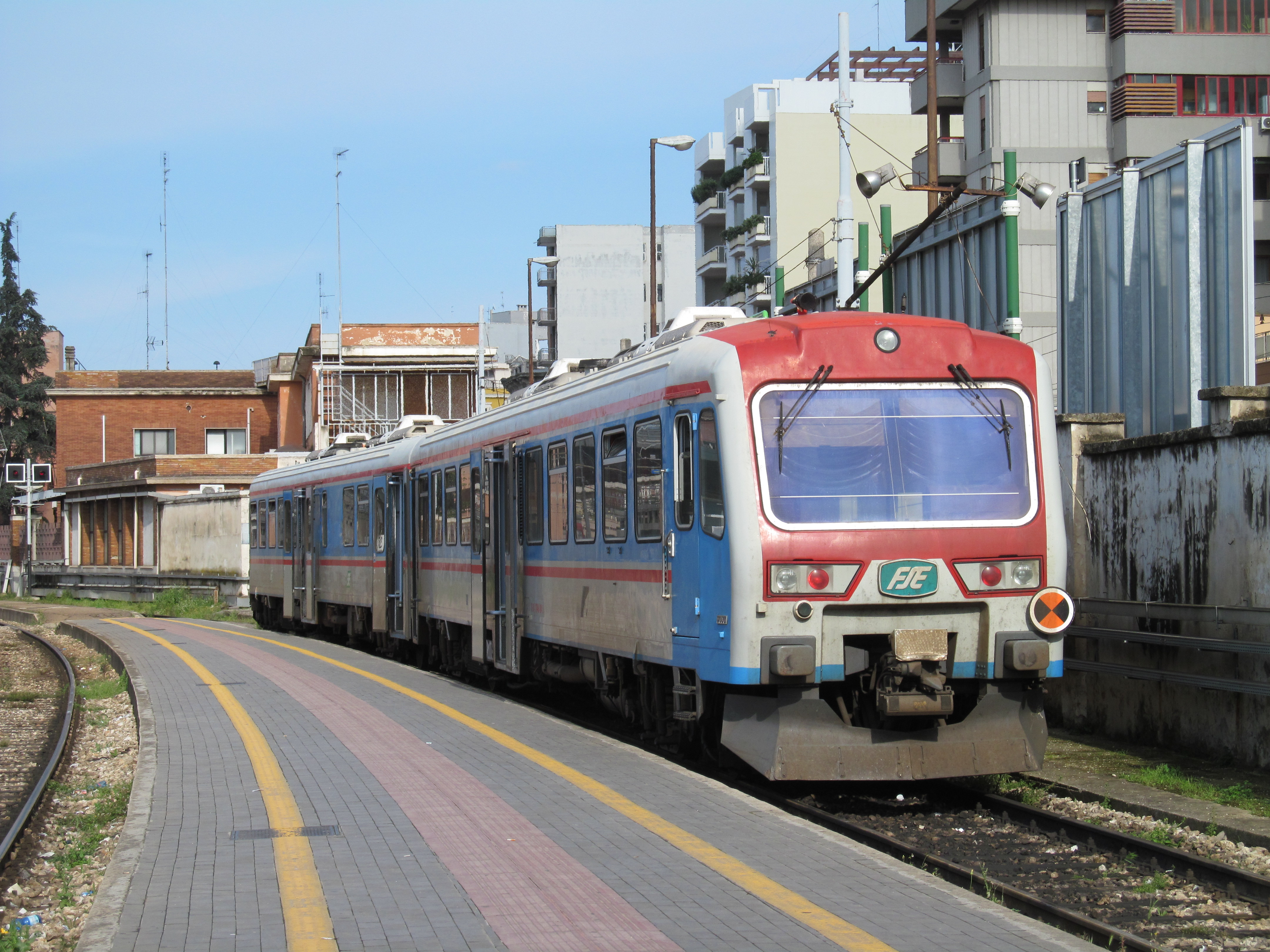
An FSE train at the station

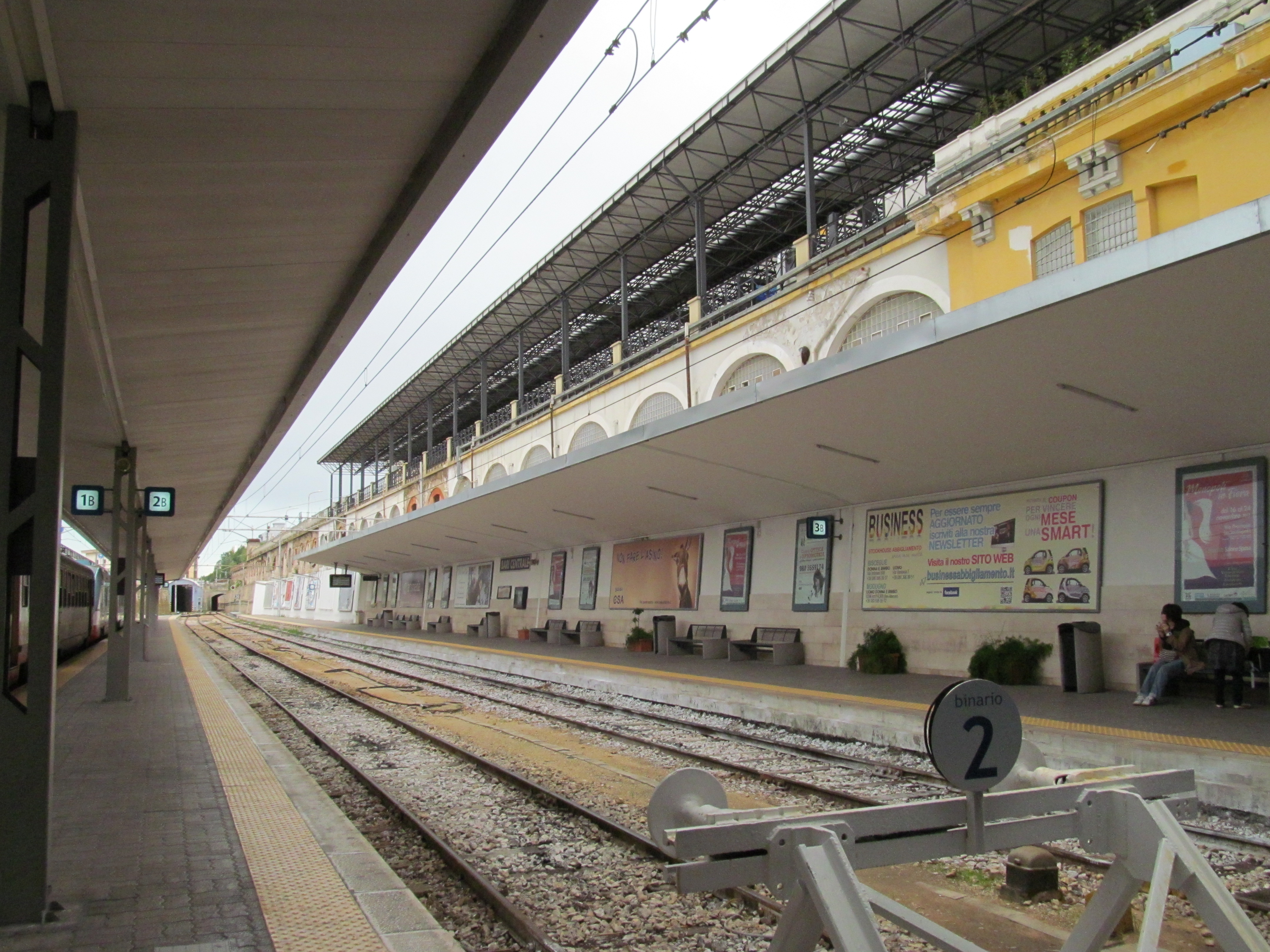
The Ferrotramviaria station

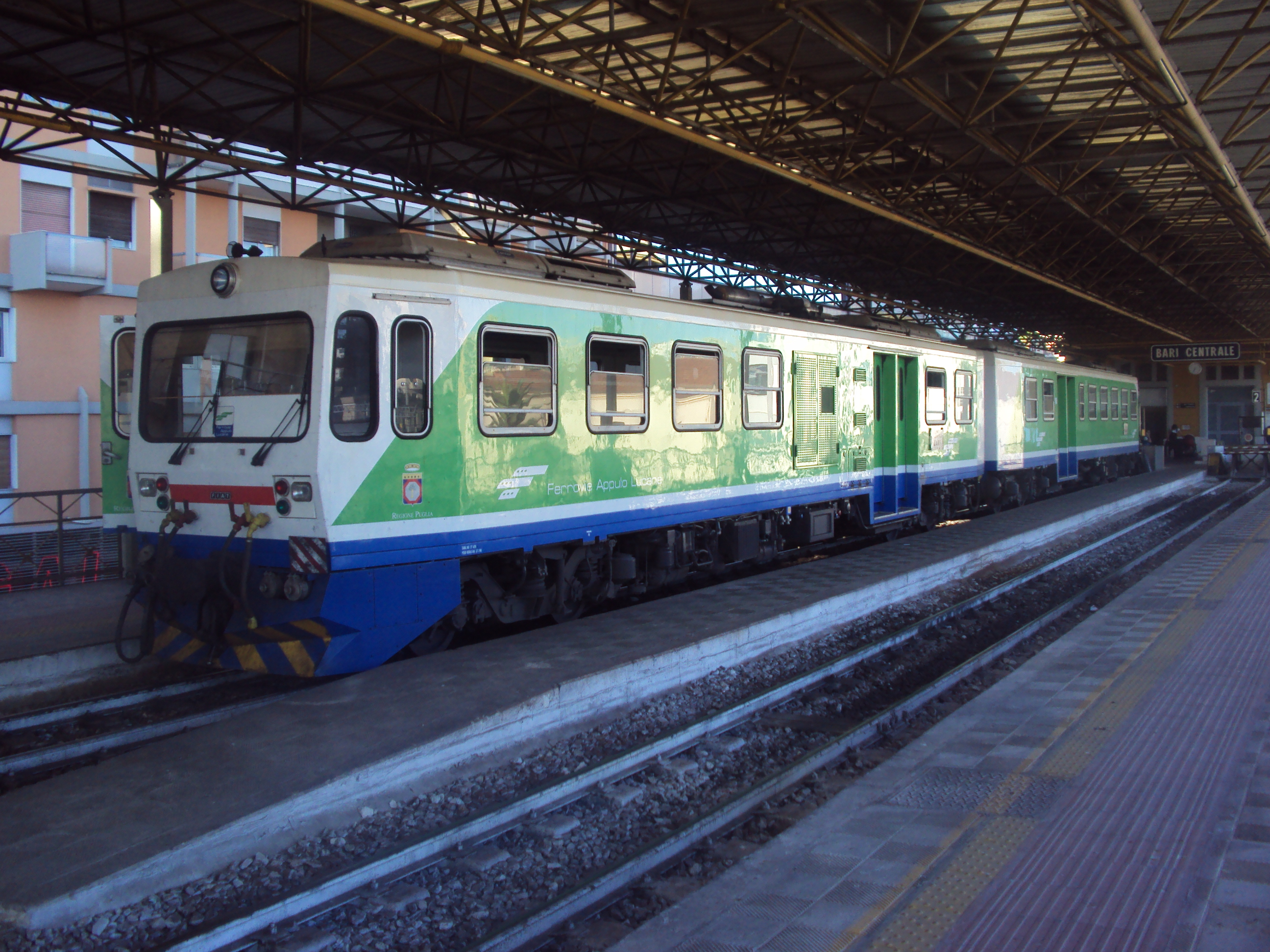
A train at the Ferrovie Appulo Lucane station

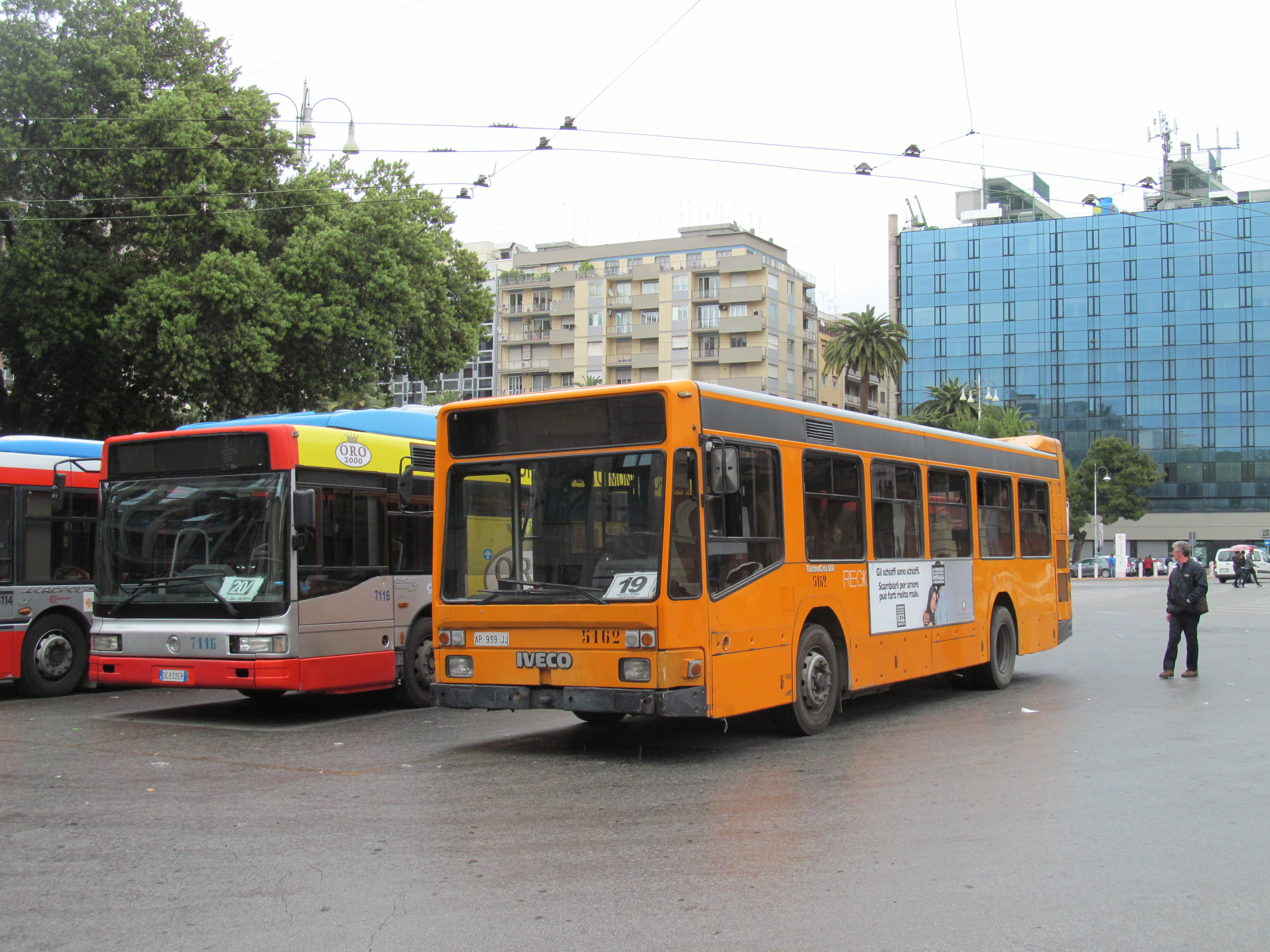
Buses loading outside the station

== See also ==
- Bari metropolitan railway service
- List of Bari metropolitan railway stations
- Railway stations in Italy
