= Bari Parco Sud railway station =

Railway station in Bari, Italy

Bari Parco Sud
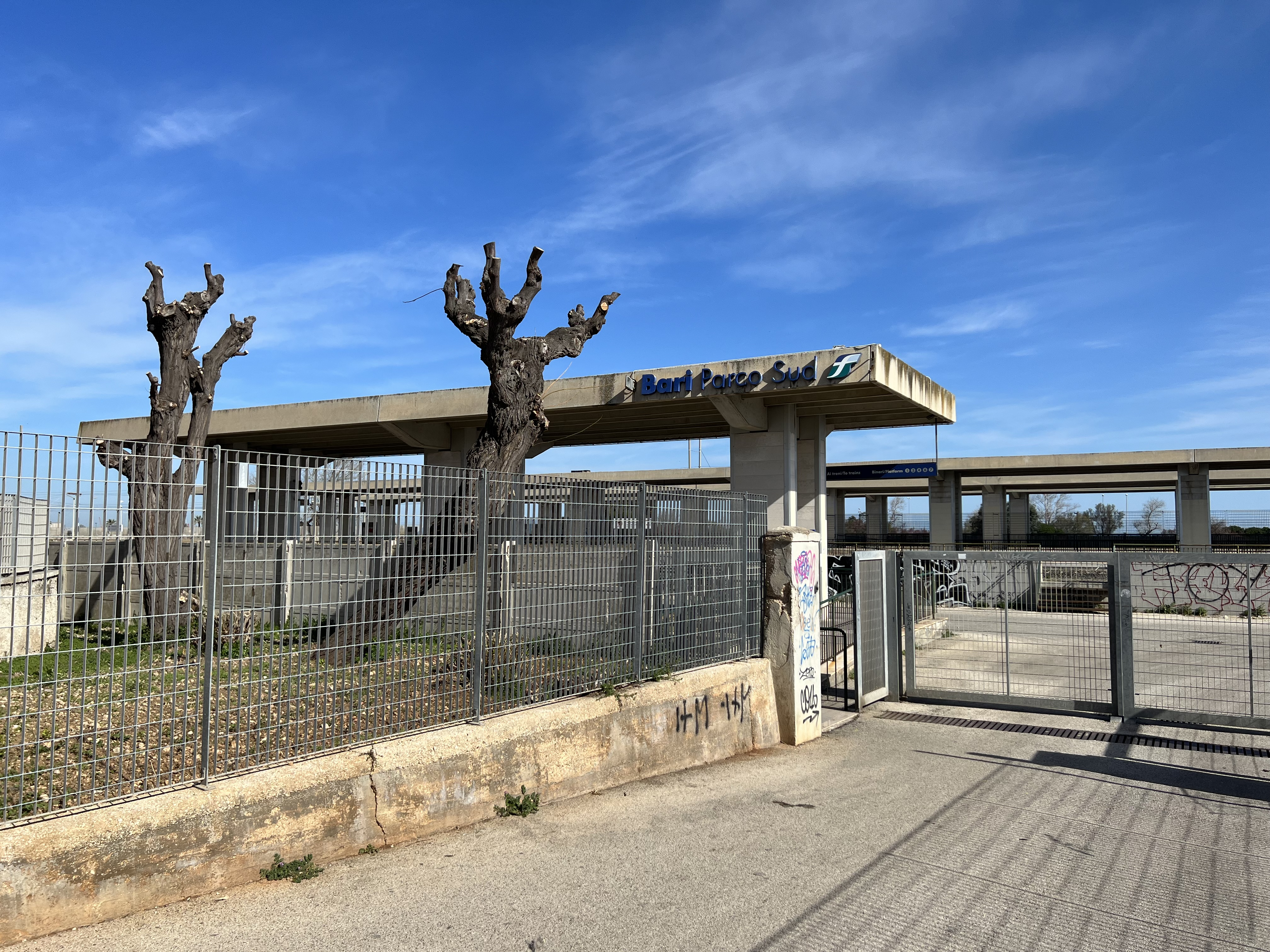
- The station platforms in 2023

General information
- Location: Bari; Bari, Bari, Apulia; Italy
- Coordinates: 41°06′53″N 16°53′53″E
- Operator: Rete Ferroviaria Italiana
- Line: Ancona–Lecce (Trenitalia)
- Platforms: 6
- Train operators: Trenitalia

Other information
- Classification: Bronze

History
- Opened: 14 December 2004; 21 years ago

Services
| Preceding station | Trenitalia | Following station |
|---|---|---|
| Marconi towards Barletta | Regionale; Barletta–Fasano | Bari Torre Quetta towards Fasano |
| Marconi towards Bari Centrale | Regionale; Bari–Lecce | Bari Torre Quetta towards Lecce |
Location
- Location within Apulia Location within Italy

Bari Parco Sud (Italian: Stazione di Bari Parco Sud) is a railway station in the Italian city of Bari, in the Province of Bari, Apulia. The station opened on 14 December 2004 and lies on the Adriatic Railway (Ancona–Lecce). The train services are operated by Trenitalia.

== Train services ==
The station is served by the following service(s):

- Regional services (Treno regionale) Foggia-Barletta-Trani-Bari - Monopoli - Fasano-Brindisi - Lecce

== See also ==
- Railway stations in Italy
- List of railway stations in Apulia
- Rail transport in Italy
- History of rail transport in Italy
