= Marconi railway station =

Railway station in Italy

Marconi
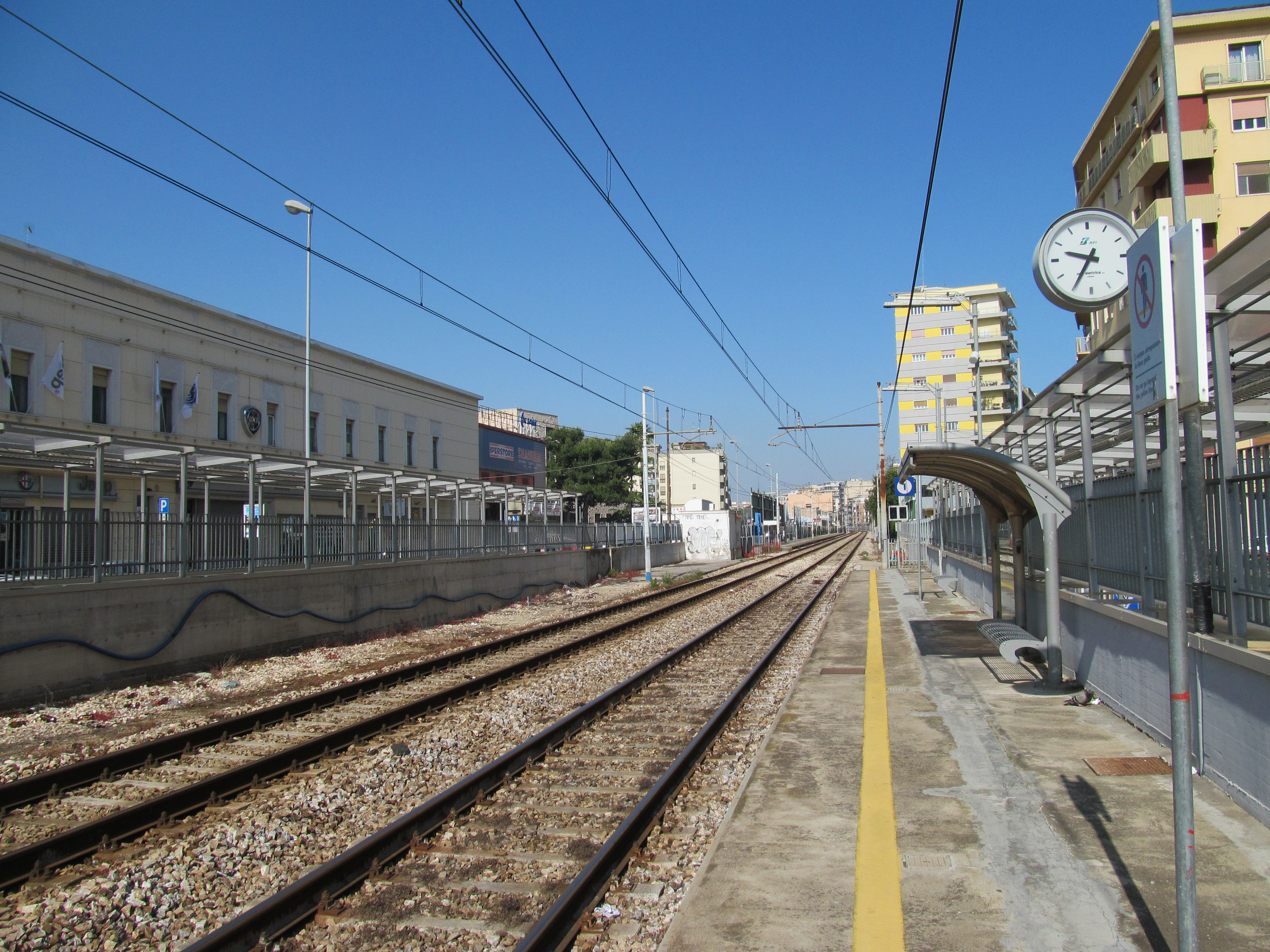

General information
- Location: Bari; Bari, Bari, Apulia; Italy
- Coordinates: 41°07′01″N 16°53′15″E
- Operator: Rete Ferroviaria Italiana
- Line: Ancona–Lecce (Trenitalia)
- Platforms: 2
- Train operators: Trenitalia

Other information
- Classification: Bronze

History
- Opened: 31 May 1992; 34 years ago

Services
Preceding station	Trenitalia	Following station
Bari Centrale towards Barletta	Regionale; Barletta–Fasano	Bari Parco Sud towards Fasano
Bari Centrale Terminus	Regionale; Bari–Lecce	Bari Parco Sud towards Lecce
Location
- Location within Apulia Location within Italy

Marconi railway station (Italian: Stazione di Marconi) is a railway station in the Italian city of Bari, in the Province of Bari, Apulia. It opened on 31 May 1992 and lies on the Adriatic Railway (Ancona–Lecce). The train services are operated by Trenitalia.

== Services ==
As of the June 2025 timetable change, the following services stop at Marconi:

- Regionale: local service to Barletta and Fasano.

== See also ==
- Railway stations in Italy
- List of railway stations in Apulia
- Rail transport in Italy
- History of rail transport in Italy
