= Bari–Bitritto railway line =

Bari–Bitritto

Overview
- Owner: Rete Ferroviaria Italiana
- Line number: 136

Service
- Operator(s): Trenitalia

History
- Opened: 8 January 2024

Technical
- Track gauge: 1,435 mm (4 ft 8 1/2 in) standard gauge
- Electrification: 3,000 V DC

The Bari–Bitritto railway line is a standard gauge railway line in Italy. It runs 11.2 kilometres (7.0 mi) from Bari Centrale to Bitritto. It was built by Rete Ferroviaria Italiana (RFI) and opened in 2024. Trenitalia operates services over the line.

== History ==
The line had a long gestation period, with initial planning beginning in 1986 and construction in 1998. In the early 2000s the project was associated with Ferrovie Appulo Lucane, operator of several 950 mm (3 ft 1 3/8 in) lines in the Apulia and Basilicata regions. Eventually recast as a standard gauge line under Rete Ferroviaria Italiana, it opened for regular service on 8 January 2024.

== Operation ==
Passenger services on the line are operated by Trenitalia. As of the June 2025 timetable change, these consisted of roughly one train every 40 to 50 minutes in each direction between Bari Centrale and Bitritto.
