= Trani railway station =

Railway station in Trani, Italy

Trani
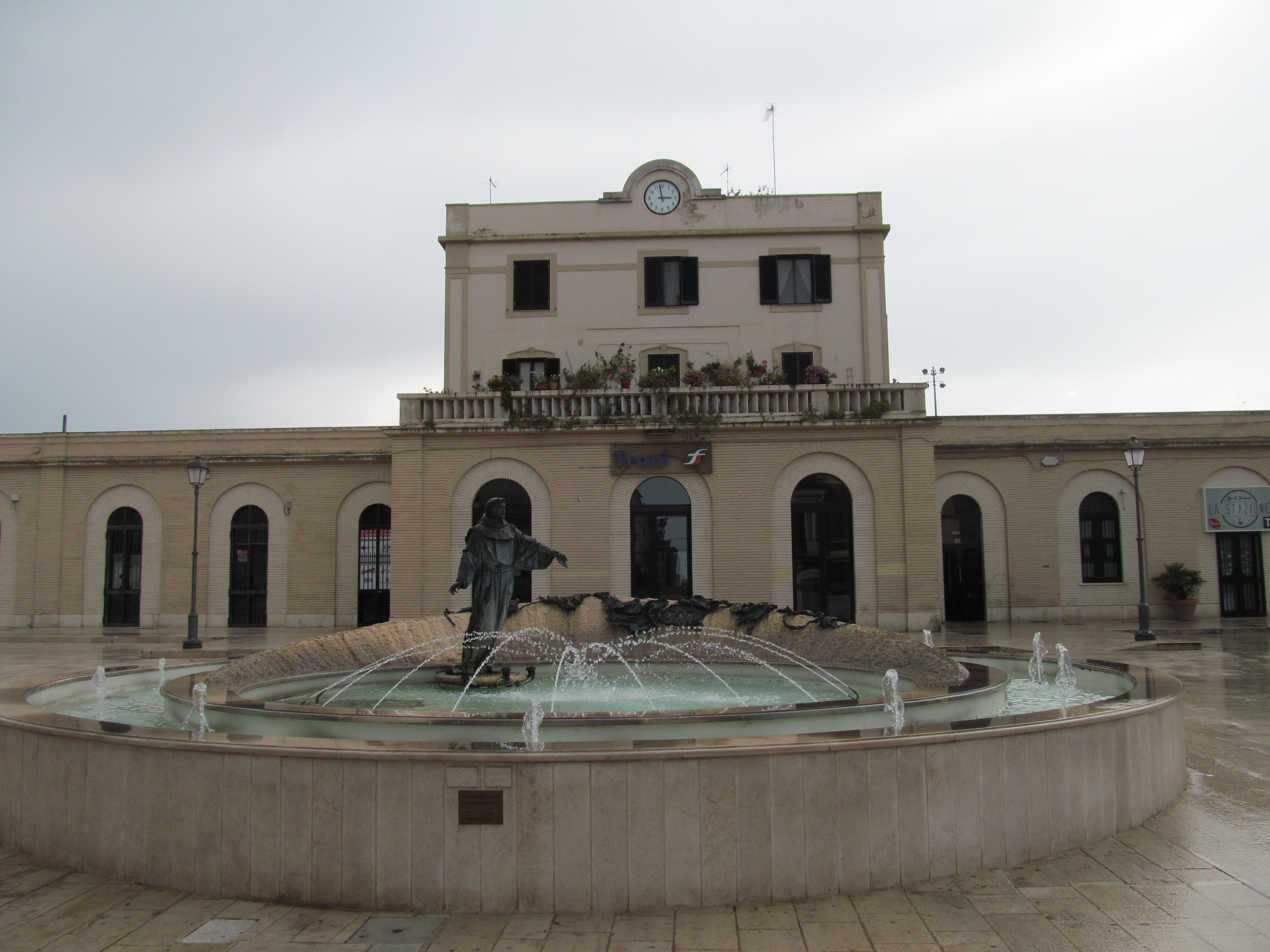
- Trani railway station

General information
- Location: Trani; Trani, Barletta-Andria-Trani, Apulia; Italy
- Coordinates: 41°16′21″N 16°25′04″E
- Operator: Rete Ferroviaria Italiana
- Line: Ancona–Lecce
- Platforms: 3
- Train operators: Trenitalia

Other information
- Classification: Silver

History
- Opened: 8 November 1864; 161 years ago
Location
- Location within Apulia Location within Italy

Trani (Italian: Stazione di Trani) is a railway station in the Italian town of Trani, in the Province of Barletta-Andria-Trani, Apulia. The station lies on the Adriatic railway. Train services are operated by Trenitalia.

== See also ==
- Railway stations in Italy
- List of railway stations in Apulia
- Rail transport in Italy
- History of rail transport in Italy
