= Bari–Barletta railway =

Railway line in southern Italy

Overview
- Status: in use
- Line number: FR
- Locale: Apulia, Italy
- Termini: Bari Centrale; Barletta
- Stations: 14

Service
- Type: commuter rail
- Operator(s): Ferrotramviaria
- Rolling stock: Alstom ELT 200 EMU

History
- Opened: 1965

Technical
- Track gauge: 1,435 mm (4 ft 8 1/2 in) standard gauge
- Electrification: 3,000 V DC, overhead lines
Route map
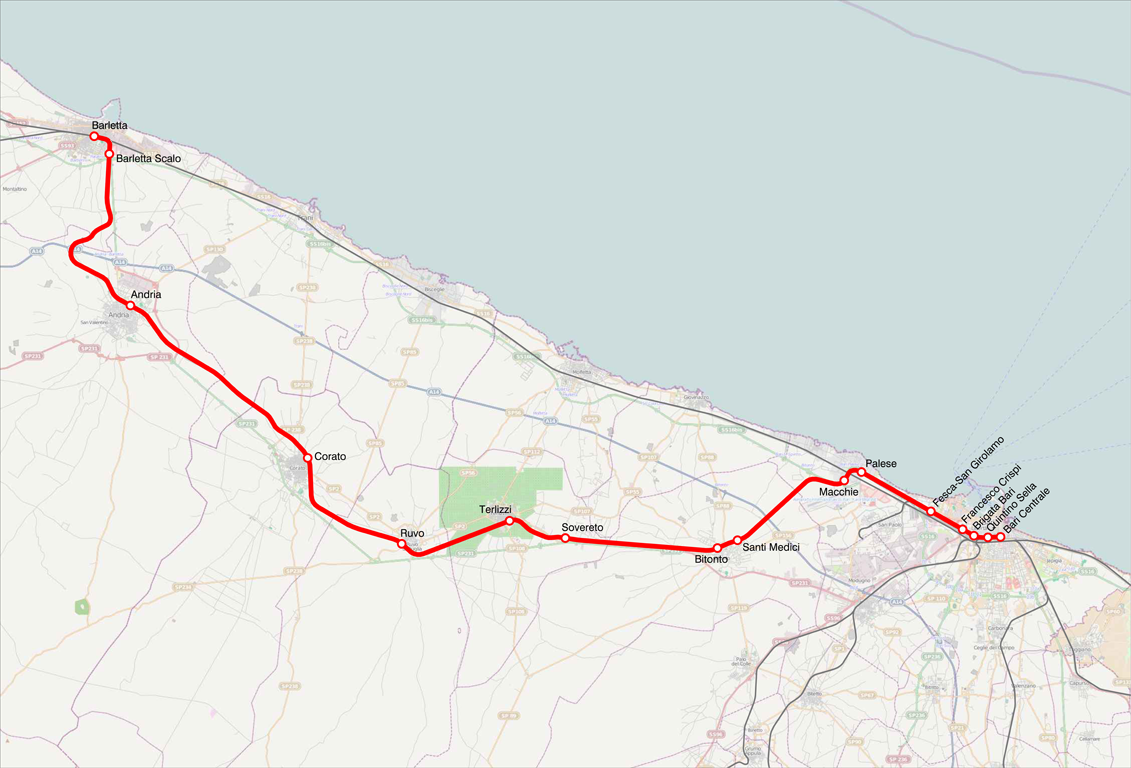

The Bari–Barletta railway is a regional railway line in Apulia, Italy, managed by the private company Ferrotramviaria.

== History ==
The line was opened in 1965, replacing an old, narrow gauge, tramway line, operated with steam locomotives.

Since the 1990s the line has been refurbished, converting a portion to double track, as follows: in November 2004 from Bitonto to Ruvo, in April 2005 from Palese to Bitonto, and in January 2006 from Fesca to Palese.

Since 22 December 2008 the section of the line within the city of Bari has been shared with the metropolitan railway service. Since then, the line operation, known before as Ferrovia Bari Nord ("Bari northern railway"), has been called Ferrovie del Nord Barese ("Bari region northern railways").

At around 11:30am local time, on 12 July 2016, a head-on collision between two passenger trains occurred on the single track section of the line near Andria, north of Bari. At least 23 people were killed and dozens more injured.
