= Andria–Corato train collision =

July 2016 train crash in Italy

Andria-Corato train collision
- Location within Italy Location within Apulia

Details
- Date: 12 July 2016; 10 years ago 11:06 CEST (09:06 UTC)
- Location: Andria, Apulia
- Coordinates: 41°11′51.5″N 16°21′36.8″E
- Country: Italy
- Line: Bari–Barletta railway
- Operator: Ferrotramviaria
- Incident type: Head-on collision
- Cause: Timetable error

Statistics
- Trains: 2
- Deaths: 23 (2 drivers, 1 conductor, 1 off-duty conductor, 19 passengers)
- Injured: 54

The Andria–Corato train collision happened late in the morning of 12 July 2016 when two regional passenger trains on a single-track section of the Bari–Barletta railway collided head-on between the towns of Andria and Corato in the Apulia region of southern Italy. Twenty-three people were killed and 54 injured. The stretch of track is operated by regional rail company Ferrotramviaria.

== Background ==
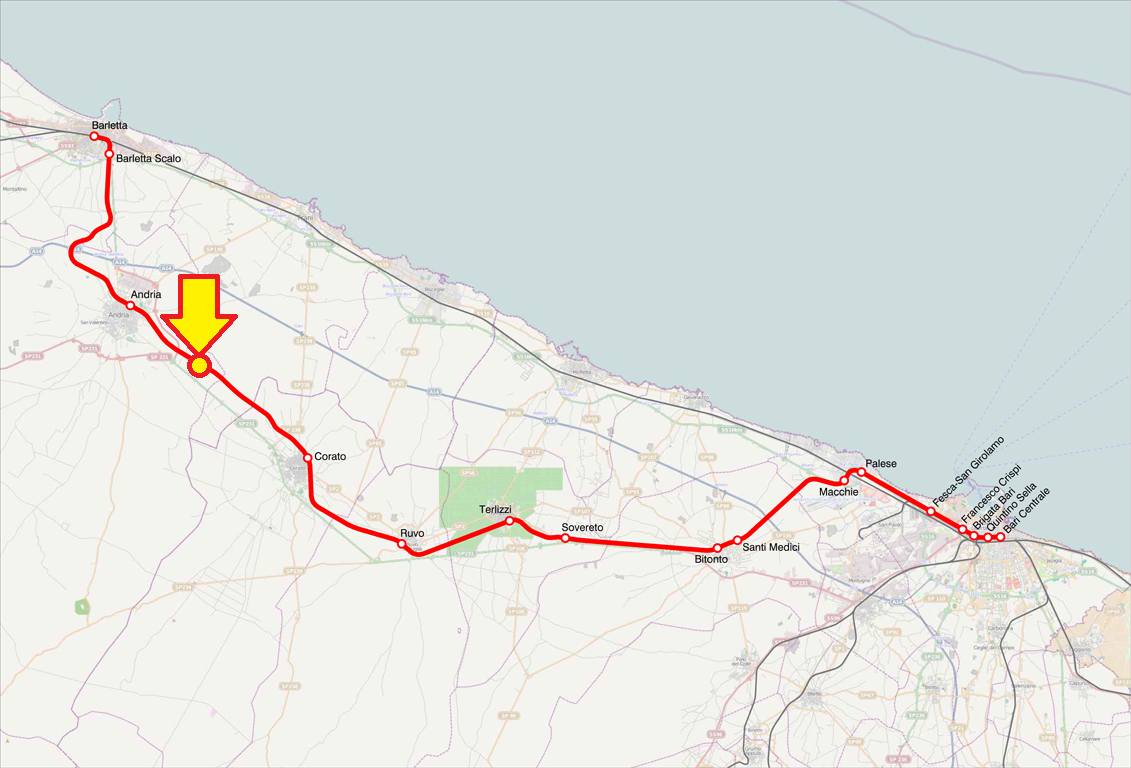
Route of the Bari–Barletta line, with location of the incident marked

The Bari–Barletta line is laid to standard gauge, with 3,000 V DC overhead electrification. Since the 1990s the line has been refurbished, and is mostly upgraded to double track. The crash occurred between the Corato and Andria stations, on the remaining single-track section of the line between Ruvo di Puglia and Barletta. That 37-kilometre (23 mi) section operates with "telephonic block" signalling, where station masters must notify the arrival of trains and inform drivers whether it is safe to proceed. EU funds were made available in April 2012 to upgrade this remaining section to double track, but at the time of the crash the work had only recently been put for tender.

== Collision ==
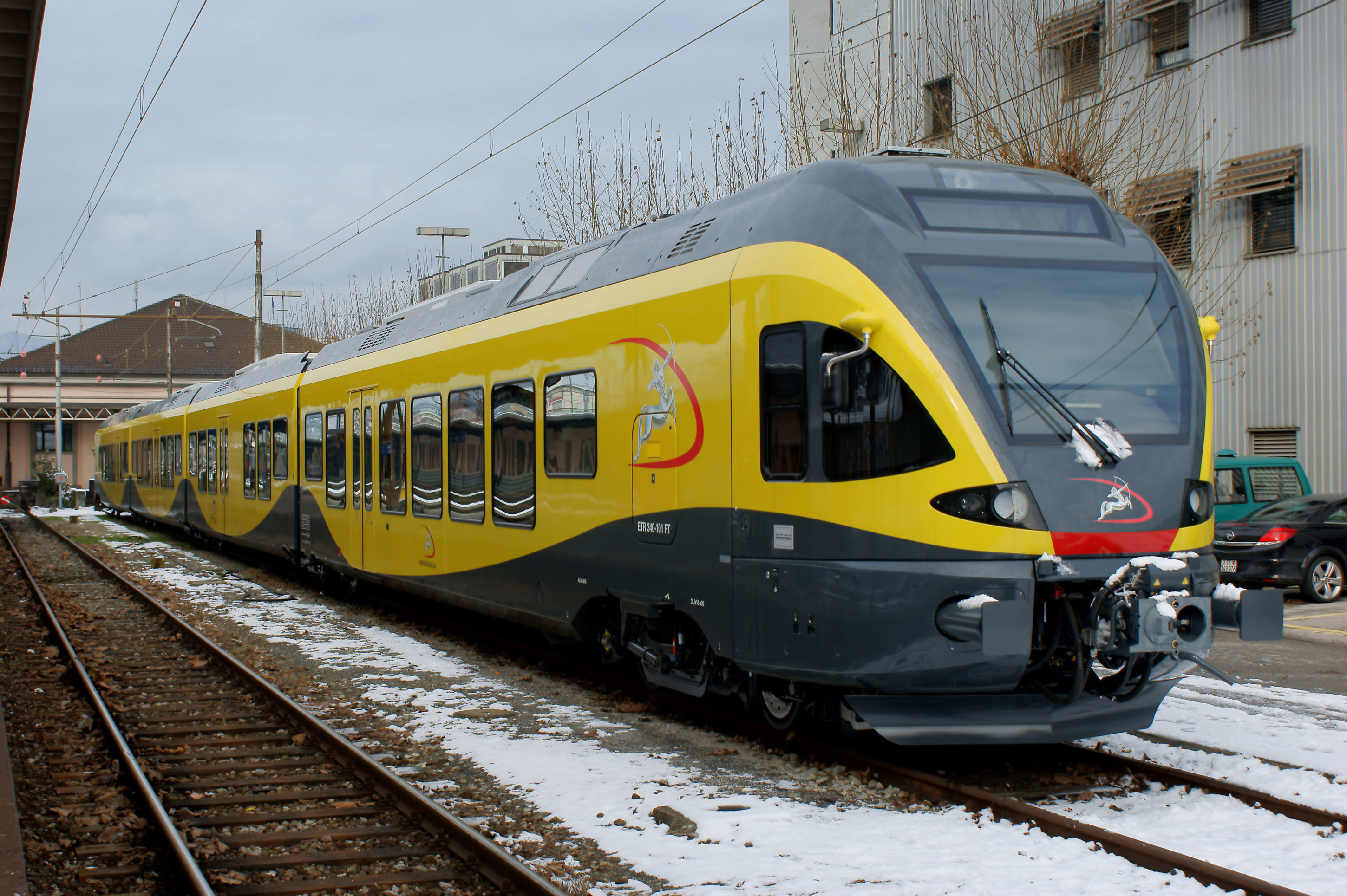
A Ferrotramviaria ETR 340 train of the same type involved in the crash

The collision occurred at 11:06 local time (09:06 UTC) in the countryside, adjacent to an olive grove, approximately 6 kilometres (3.7 mi) from Andria station and 51 km (32 mi) from Bari. (Many earlier reports mentioned the time 11:38 and also other train service numbers than those later reported. But this seems to have been a mistake.) The trains involved were a Stadler FLIRT ETR 340 (service ET1016 from Bari to Barletta) and an Alstom Coradia ELT 200 (service ET1021 from Barletta to Bari), each being a four-carriage multiple unit. They were travelling at speeds of up to 100 kilometres per hour (62 mph) in opposite directions: ET1021 travelling south-east from Andria and ET1016 north-west from Corato. The crash occurred on a curve, giving neither driver any chance to spot the other train, or attempt an emergency braking, before the collision. The first two carriages and the fore part of the third one of ET1016, and the leading carriage of ET1021, disintegrated in the impact; the second carriage of ET1021 partially derailed and was heavily damaged; the other cars of both trains remained on track almost intact.

The weather at the time was described as hot, moist and sunny, with temperatures up to 40 °C (104 °F).

=== Casualties ===
Twenty-three people were killed and 54 injured. Both drivers and one of the two conductors were killed. One of the victims was a farmer who was hit by a metal plate while he was working close to the crash site.

=== Rescue ===
The rescue operations were complicated by the lack of road access to the site of the crash and by the hot weather.

A field hospital was set up adjacent to the crash site. Some of the injured were airlifted to hospital by medical helicopter. An appeal was made for local people to donate blood. Around 200 emergency service personnel were involved in the rescue effort, as well as members of the army.

== Reactions ==
The Italian Prime Minister, Matteo Renzi, cut short a visit to Milan, returned to Rome and then, in the early evening, visited the crash site. The Italian President, Sergio Mattarella, expressed condolences for the crash, as did Pope Francis. The Mayor of Corato, Massimo Mazzilli, said that the scene was "as if an airplane fell out of the sky".

== Investigation ==
Graphic timetable of the Corato train collision.

The Agenzia Nazionale per la Sicurezza delle Ferrovie (ANSF) is responsible for investigating rail accidents in Italy. The rail operator stated that it had secured records of the communications between the stations at either end of the single track section and the phone calls made between the station masters and the two drivers. The train event recorder from one of the trains was recovered from the wreckage, but the other's was destroyed.

Initial responses from the public inquiry led by the Public Prosecutor of Trani's Justice Court said that departure clearance from Andria for ET1021 should not have been given because, when it left the station, ET1016 was already on the track. Investigations will try to determine why ET1021 was cleared for departure before ET1016 (the train coming from the opposite direction) had arrived at Andria station. On 14 July 2016, the station masters of both Corato and Andria were placed under investigation for their roles in the disaster.

According to the timetable, both trains should have been crossing in Andria's station between 10:58 and 10:59. Accounted sources report that a third train ET1642, running late from Corato to Andria and preceding ET1016, could have been confused with ET1016 itself, causing Andria's station master to assume the track between Andria and Corato was free of traffic once the late train had departed northbound to Barletta.

On 6 December 2017, Ministry of Infrastructure and Transport published a survey report on the accident and confirmed the direct cause was the confusion of ET1642 and ET1016.

Timetable of Bari–Barletta line
	ET1642		ET1016		ET1021	
	Scheduled	Actual	Scheduled	Actual	Scheduled	Actual
Bari Centrale			10:03		11:54	
...	...	...	...	...	...	...
Ruvo	10:19	10:41:00	10:41	10:52:00	11:16	
Corato	10:27	10:50:30	10:48	11:00:55	11:09	
				11:05:20		11:05:20
Andria	10:37	11:00:00	10:59		10:58	11:00:35
Barletta Scalo			11:09		10:47	10:48:00
Barletta Centrale			11:11		10:44	10:44:00

== Lawsuit ==
In 2023, a station manager was sentenced to 6.5 years of prison and a train driver was sentenced to 7 years of prison.

== See also ==
- List of rail accidents in 2016
