= Bari Torre a Mare railway station =

Railway station in Bari, Italy

Bari Torre a Mare

General information
- Location: Torre a Mare; Torre a Mare, Bari, Apulia; Italy
- Coordinates: 41°04′58″N 16°59′43″E
- Operator: Rete Ferroviaria Italiana
- Line: Ancona–Lecce (Trenitalia)
- Platforms: 4
- Train operators: Trenitalia

Other information
- Classification: Bronze

History
- Opened: 1865
Location
- Location within Apulia Location within Italy

Bari Torre a Mare (Italian: Stazione di Bari Torre a Mare) is a railway station in the Italian town of Torre a Mare, in the Province of Bari, Apulia. The station lies on the Adriatic Railway (Ancona–Lecce). The train services are operated by Trenitalia.

Until 1940 the station was called Noicattaro.

== Train services ==
The station is served by the following service(s):

- Regional services (treno regionale) Foggia-Bari - Monopoli - Brindisi - Lecce

== See also ==
- Railway stations in Italy
- List of railway stations in Apulia
- Rail transport in Italy
- History of rail transport in Italy
