= Bari Zona Industriale railway station =

Railway station in Italy, managed by RFI

Bari Zona Industriale

General information
- Location: Bari; Bari, Bari, Apulia; Italy
- Coordinates: 41°07′40″N 16°49′35″E
- Operator: Rete Ferroviaria Italiana
- Line: Ancona–Lecce (Trenitalia)
- Platforms: 2
- Train operators: Trenitalia

Other information
- Classification: Bronze
Location
- Location within Apulia Location within Italy

Bari Zona Industriale (Italian: Stazione di Bari Zona Industriale) is a railway station in the Italian city of Bari, in the Province of Bari, Apulia. The station lies on the Adriatic Railway (Ancona–Lecce). The train services are operated by Trenitalia.

Bari Zona Industriale is a request stop.

== Train services ==
The station is served by the following service(s):

- Regional services (Treno regionale) Foggia - Barletta - Bari

== See also ==
- Railway stations in Italy
- List of railway stations in Apulia
- Rail transport in Italy
- History of rail transport in Italy
