= Polignano a Mare railway station =

Railway station in Italy

Polignano a Mare
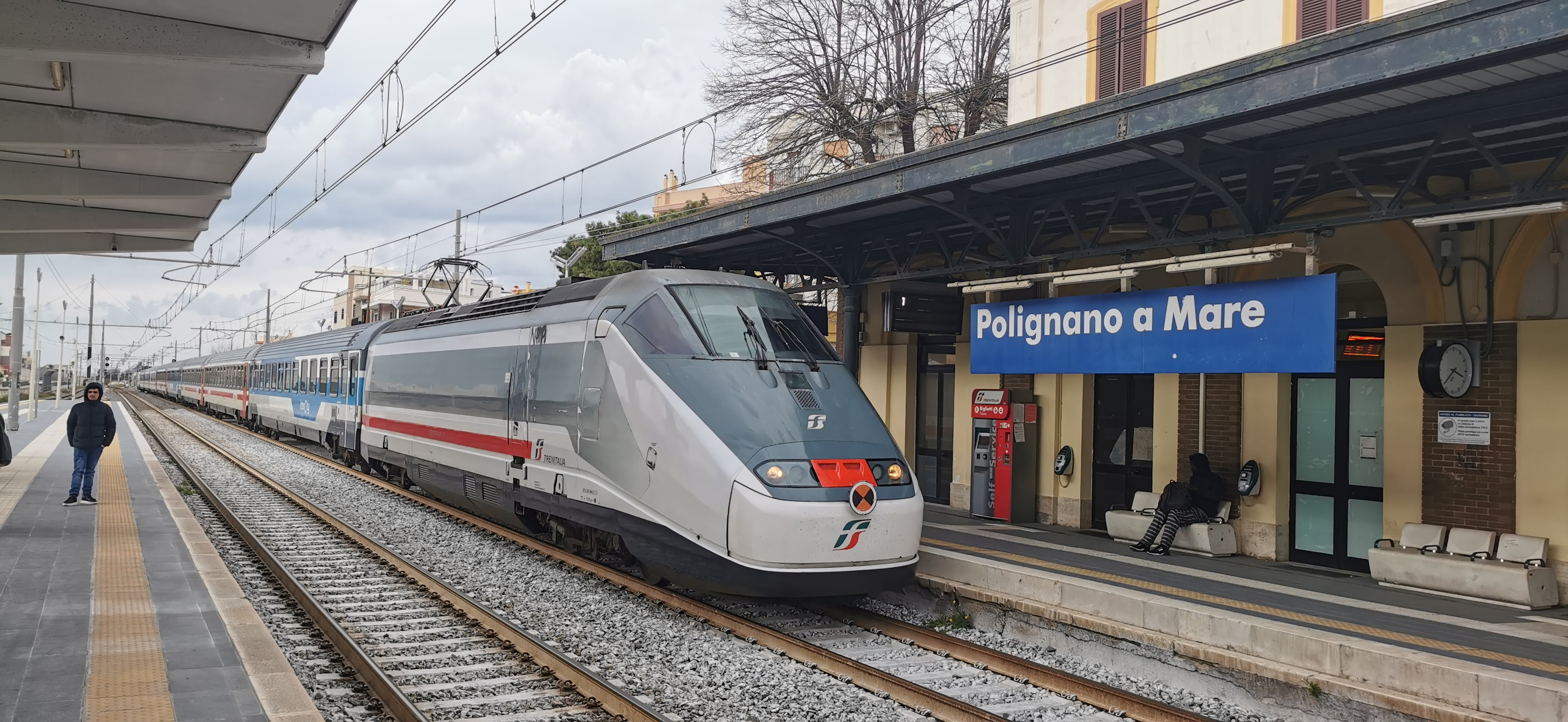

General information
- Location: Polignano a Mare; Polignano a Mare, Bari, Apulia; Italy
- Coordinates: 40°59′27″N 17°13′07″E
- Operator: Rete Ferroviaria Italiana
- Line: Ancona–Lecce (Trenitalia)
- Platforms: 3
- Train operators: Trenitalia

Other information
- Classification: Bronze

History
- Opened: 1865; 161 years ago
Location
- Location within Apulia Location within Italy

Polignano a Mare (Italian: Stazione di Polignano a Mare) is a railway station in the Italian town of Polignano a Mare, in the Province of Bari, Apulia. The station lies on the Adriatic Railway (Ancona–Lecce). The train services are operated by Trenitalia.

== Train services ==
The station is served by the following service(s):

- Regional services (Treno regionale) Bari - Monopoli - Brindisi - Lecce

== See also ==
- Railway stations in Italy
- List of railway stations in Apulia
- Rail transport in Italy
- History of rail transport in Italy
