= Trolleybuses in Lecce =

Transit system in Apulia, Italy

Lecce trolleybus system
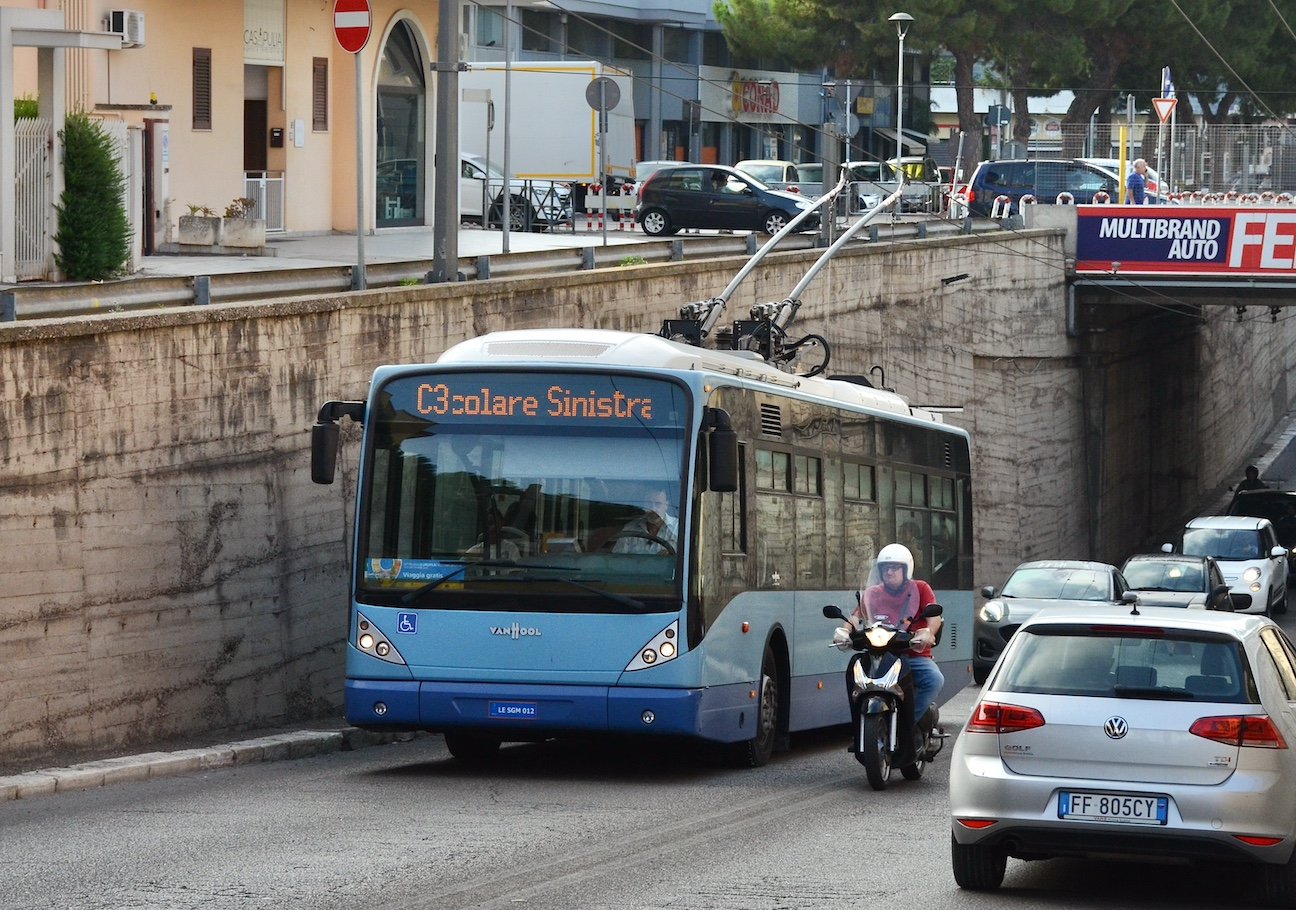
- A trolleybus on circular route C3 in 2022

Operation
- Locale: Lecce, Apulia, Italy
- Open: 12 January 2012
- Status: Open
- Routes: 3
- Operator: SGM Lecce

Infrastructure
- Stock: 12 trolleybuses

Statistics
Overview
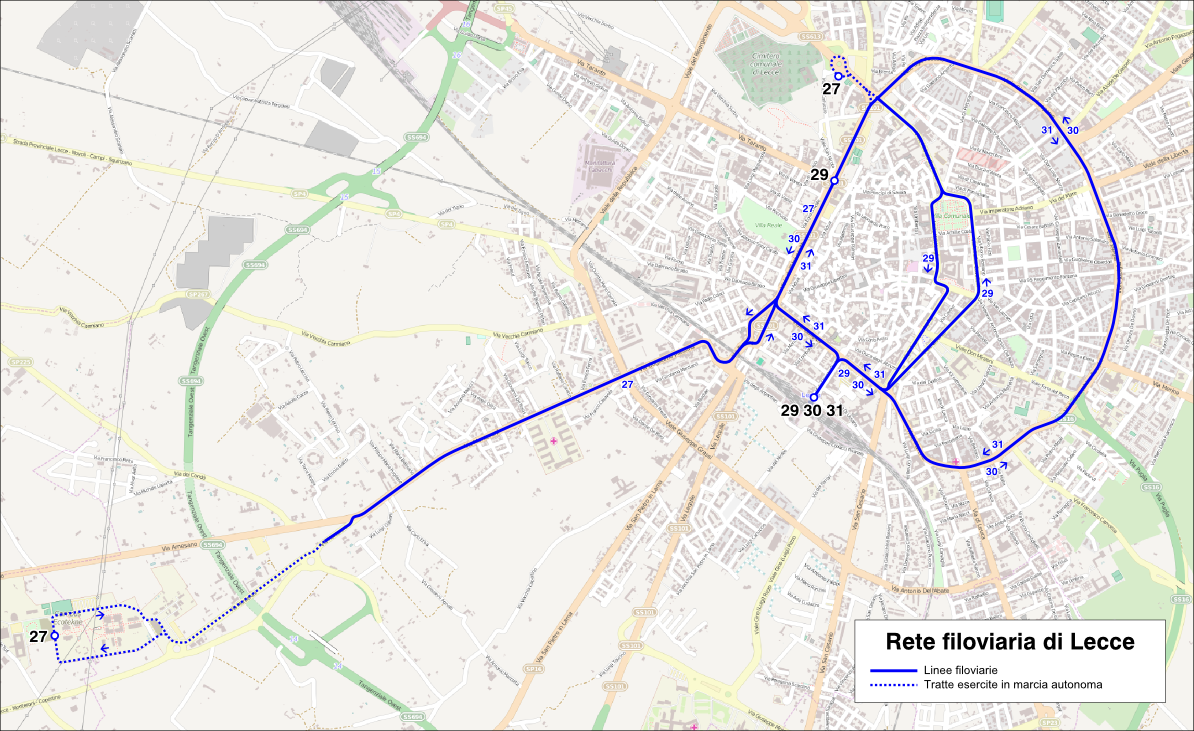
- Website: http://www.sgmlecce.it/ SGM Lecce (in Italian)

The Lecce trolleybus system (Italian: Rete filoviaria di Lecce) forms part of the public transport network of the city and comune of Lecce, in the Apulia region, southern Italy.

Opened in January 2012, the system comprises three routes, of which one is a circular (loop) route with different route numbers for the two directions. The last of the three routes opened in June 2014.

== History ==
The network was made possible thanks to state funding authorised by the law 211 of 26 February 1992 (Interventions in the field of mass rapid transport systems). The tender for its construction was won by a consortium made up of Sirti, Van Hool NV, Imet Spa and Vossloh Kiepe GmbH.

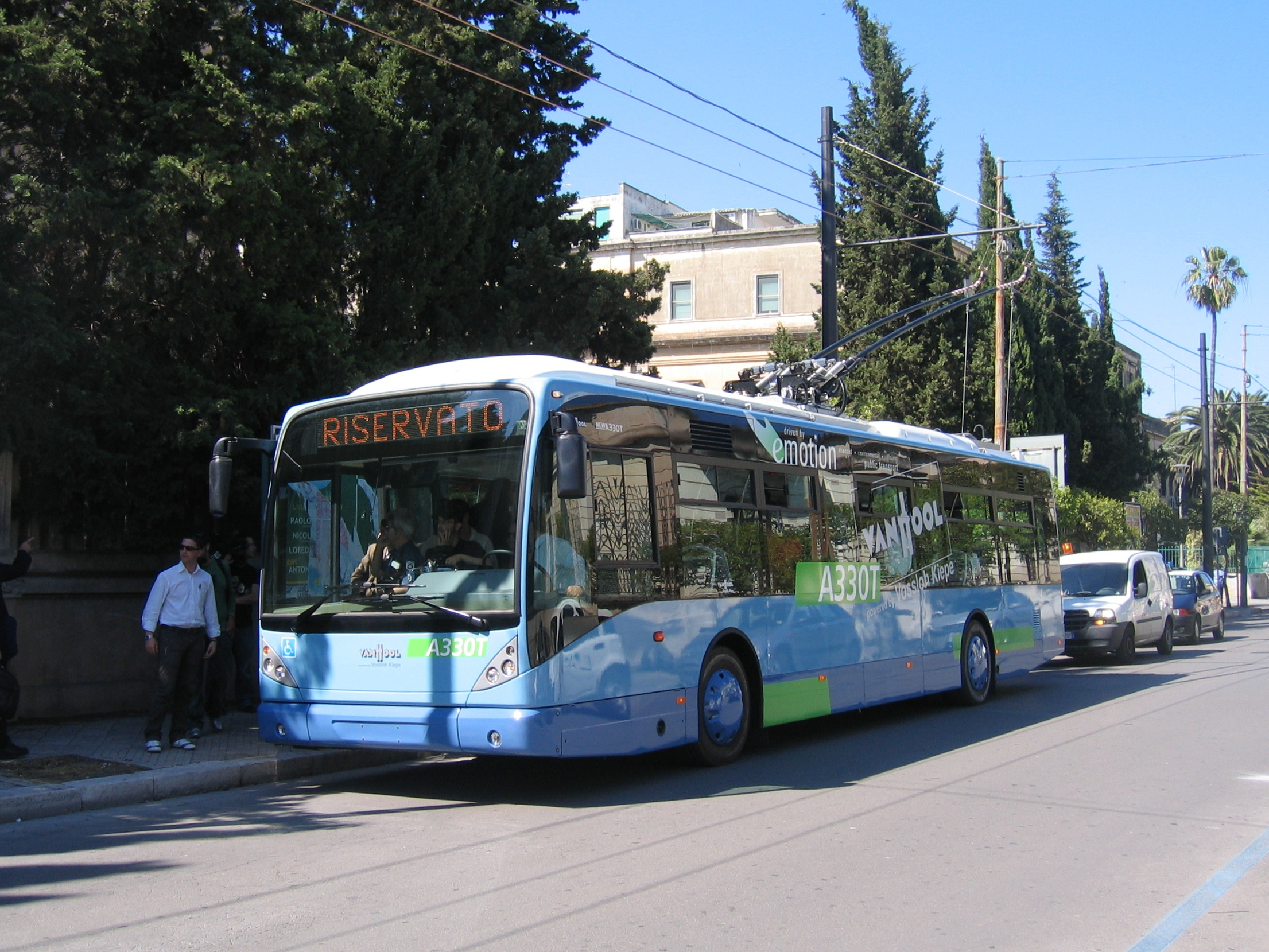
The first trolleybus a few weeks after delivery, in 2007. The opening of the system for service ultimately was delayed until 2012.

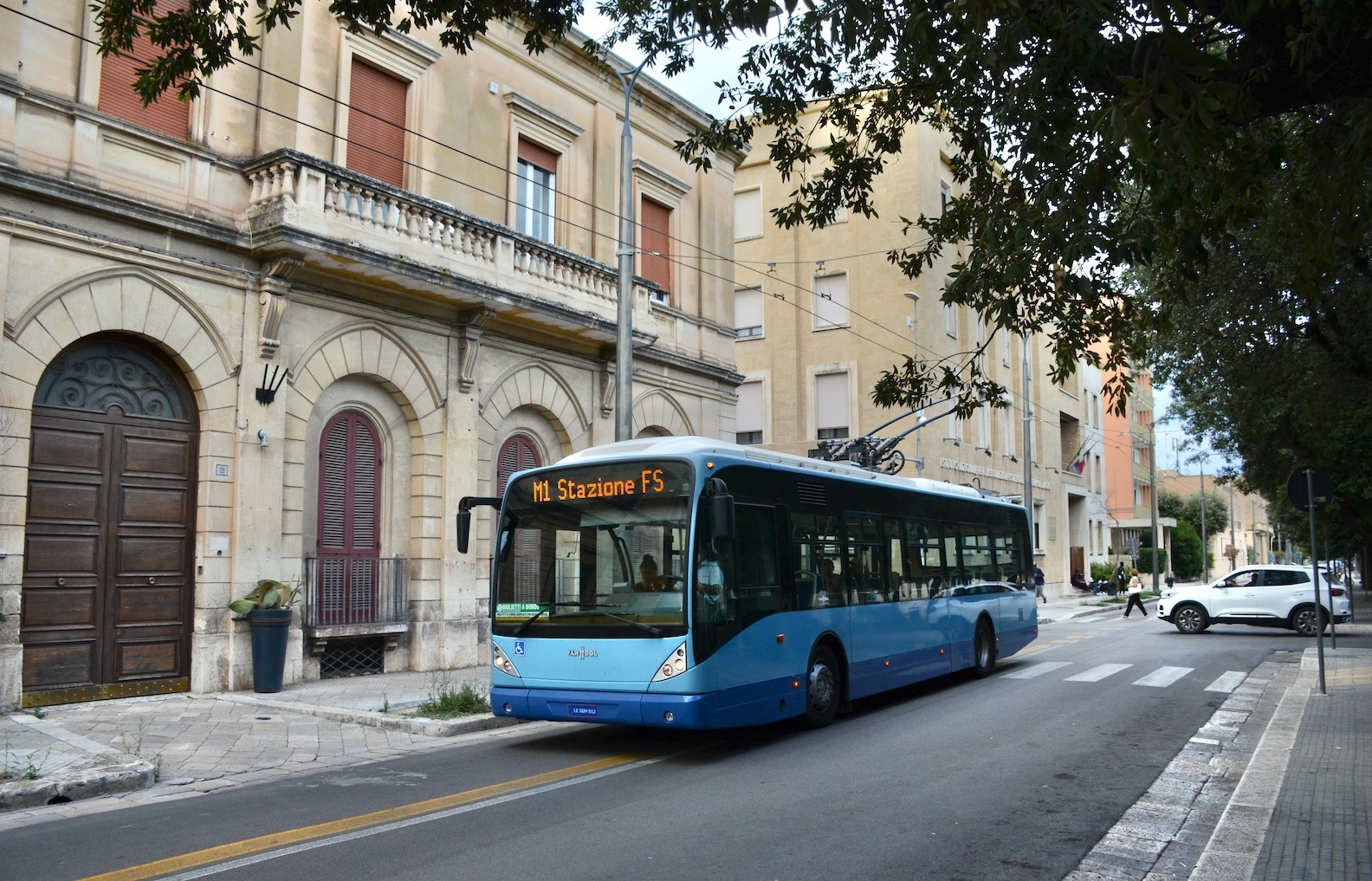
A trolleybus on route M1, formerly 29, in 2022

The first of 12 Van Hool trolleybuses on order was delivered on 30 March 2007, and the first overhead wiring was installed during the same month. The operator, SGM Lecce, ceremonially 'opened' the network in the presence of the then-mayor, Adriana Poli Bortone, and ran an inaugural tour. However, a series of bureaucratic problems delayed the actual completion of the system and its opening for service. Delivery of additional trolleybuses began around the end of October 2007.

On 31 March 2010, SGM appointed a director of trolleybus operations, a move that facilitated commencement of procedures for driver training. Still, by October 2010 only a few test runs had taken place.

The system was finally opened on 12 January 2012, but only one route (29) initially. At the time of the system's opening, four of the twelve vehicles on order – all of which had been completed by the end of 2007 – were still being stored at the Van Hool factory in Belgium.

On 2 February 2013, the second line was opened, a loop route numbered 31 in the clockwise direction and 30 in the counterclockwise direction, with a headway of 40 minutes. The third route, 27, opened on 15 June 2014, connecting the city centre with Ecotekne. A large loop at the route's outer end is not equipped with overhead wiring, and the trolleybuses cover it using their diesel engines.

Trolleybuses do not operate on any route on Sundays.

In June 2022, the routes were renumbered, with route 27 becoming S13, route 29 becoming M1, and circular 30/31 (counterclockwise/clockwise) becoming C3 and C2, respectively. A change made to the circular routes at that time was that they ceased to divert from Via Gallipoli to serve the railway station. At the time of these changes, route 27 had been temporarily operated by motorbuses since the end of 2021 because of roadworks and the need to repair a substation, but trolleybuses returned to the route, now S13, in October 2024.

== Lines ==
The Lecce trolleybus lines are as follows:

- M1 (formerly 29): City Terminal (on Via Porta d'Europa) – city centre – Lecce railway station
- C2/C3 (formerly 31/30), named Circolare destra and Circolare sinistra (clockwise circular and counterclockwise circular), with layover point at Porta Napoli
- S13 (ex-27): City Terminal – Ecotekne-Fiorini

== Fleet ==
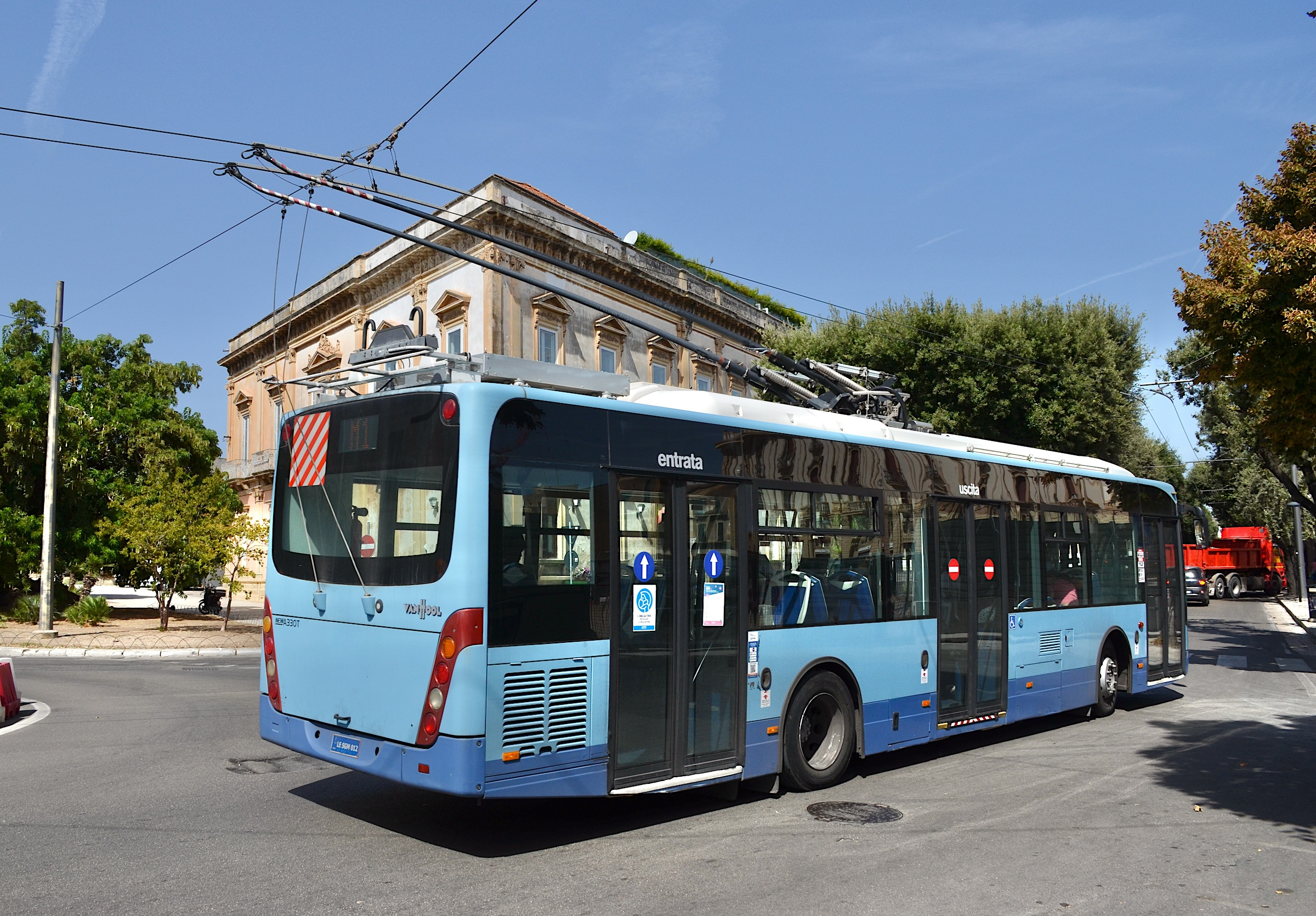
The rear and right side of one of Lecce's Van Hool A330T trolleybuses, in the two-tone blue livery they have worn since delivery

The Lecce trolleybus fleet comprises 12 Van Hool A330T 12 m dual-mode rigid buses, built in 2006–2007, each fitted with both electric traction motors and a euro 4 diesel engine.

== See also ==
- List of trolleybus systems in Italy
