= Barletta railway station =

Railway station in Barletta, Italy

Barletta
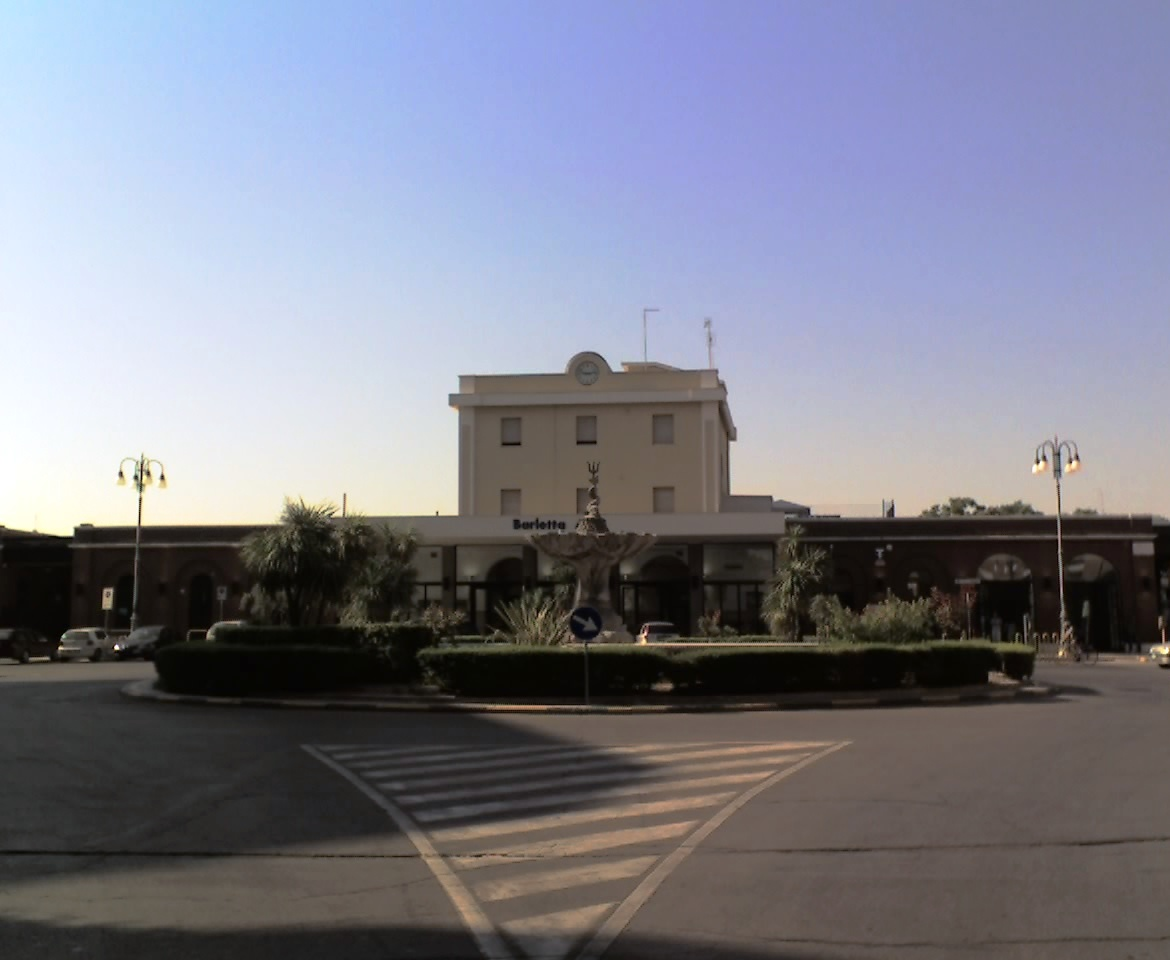
- View of the piazza and passenger building.

General information
- Location: Piazza Francesco Conteduca 1; 76121 Barletta BT; Barletta, Barletta, Apulia; Italy
- Coordinates: 41°18′55″N 16°16′43″E
- Operator: Rete Ferroviaria Italiana; Centostazioni
- Lines: Ancona–Lecce (Trenitalia); Barletta–Spinazzola (Trenitalia); Bari–Barletta (FT)
- Distance: 593.919 km (369.044 mi) from Bologna Centrale
- Platforms: 7
- Train operators: Trenitalia; Ferrotramviaria
- Connections: Urban and suburban buses

Other information
- Classification: Gold

History
- Opened: 11 August 1864; 162 years ago
Location
- Location within Apulia Location within Italy

Barletta railway station (Italian: Stazione di Barletta) is the main station serving the city and comune of Barletta, in the region of Apulia, southern Italy. Opened in 1864, it forms part of the Adriatic Railway (Ancona–Lecce), and is also a junction station for two other, regional, lines, the Barletta–Spinazzola railway, and the Bari–Barletta railway, operated by Ferrotramviaria.

In the past, the station was also connected with the Port of Barletta, by a line ending at Barletta Marittima railway station, but that connection is now closed.

The station is currently managed by Rete Ferroviaria Italiana (RFI). However, the commercial area of the passenger building is managed by Centostazioni. Train services on the Adriatic Railway and the Barletta–Spinazzola railway are operated by Trenitalia. Each of these companies is a subsidiary of Ferrovie dello Stato (FS), Italy's state-owned rail company.

Services on the Ferrovie del Nord Barese are operated by Ferrotramviaria (FT).

== Location ==
Barletta railway station is situated at Piazza Francesco Conteduca, on the southern edge of the city centre.

== History ==
The station was opened on 11 August 1864, upon the inauguration of the Foggia–Trani section of the Adriatic Railway.

On 1 October 1883, the station became a break of gauge junction station, upon the opening of the FNB, which was then a 750 mm (2 ft 5 1/2 in) narrow gauge line. The FNB station was, and still is, located in the same station yard, and is connected with the mainline station via a covered walkway, with direct access from Via Vittorio Veneto.

On 1 August 1895, the station also became a junction for the then newly opened standard gauge Barletta–Spinazzola railway. The since closed link between the station and Barletta Marittima, mentioned above, was opened on 1 August 1895.

Between 1959 and 1965, services on the FNB were suspended while that line was converted to standard gauge.

== Features ==
The station has a large passenger building housing several facilities, including a ticket office, waiting room, bar and office of traffic management. Above the ground floor where these services are found, the building is equipped with two additional floors.

In the station yard, there are seven through tracks used for passenger service. The first five are used by Trenitalia trains, while the latter two are used as a terminus for FNB trains. The tracks are served by four platforms with shelters and connecting subways.

There are other through tracks serving the goods yard, although it is not used much today, especially in light of the closure of the line to Barletta Marittima.

The station also has a locomotive shed.

== Train services ==
The station has about three million passenger movements each year, due mainly to passenger interchanges between different lines and between train and bus.

All trains stop at the station, including regional, interregional, express, InterCity and Eurostar. The station is also the terminus for all secondary line trains to Spinazzola and Bari Centrale (via the FNB), respectively. The destinations of trains departing from the station vary widely, because there are so many trains.

The station is served by the following services (incomplete):

- High speed services (Frecciargento) Rome - Foggia - Bari - Brindisi - Lecce
- High speed services (Frecciabianca) Milan - Parma - Bologna - Ancona - Pescara - Foggia - Bari - Brindisi - Lecce
- High speed services (Frecciabianca) Milan - Parma - Bologna - Ancona - Pescara - Foggia - Bari - Taranto
- High speed services (Frecciabianca) Turin - Parma - Bologna - Ancona - Pescara - Foggia - Bari - Brindisi - Lecce
- High speed services (Frecciabianca) Venice - Padua - Bologna - Ancona - Pescara - Foggia - Bari - Brindisi - Lecce
- Intercity services Rome - Foggia - Bari (- Taranto)
- Intercity services Bologna - Rimini - Ancona - Pescara - Foggia - Bari - Brindisi - Lecce
- Intercity services Bologna - Rimini - Ancona - Pescara - Foggia - Bari - Taranto
- Night train (Intercity Notte) Rome - Foggia - Bari - Brindisi - Lecce
- Night train (Intercity Notte) Milan - Parma - Bolgona - Ancona - Pescara - Foggia - Bari - Brindisi - Lecce
- Night train (Intercity Notte) Milan - Ancona - Pescara - Foggia - Bari - Taranto - Brindisi - Lecce
- Night train (Intercity Notte) Turin - Alessandria - Bolgona - Ancona - Pescara - Foggia - Bari - Brindisi - Lecce
- Regional services (Treno regionale) Foggia - Barletta - Bari
- Bari Metropolitan services (FR2) Barletta - Andria - Bitonto - Aeroporto - Bari

== See also ==
- History of rail transport in Italy
- List of railway stations in Apulia
- Rail transport in Italy
- Railway stations in Italy
