= Molfetta railway station =

Railway station in Molfetta, Italy

Molfetta

General information
- Location: Molfetta; Molfetta, Bari, Apulia; Italy
- Coordinates: 41°11′45″N 16°35′47″E
- Operator: Rete Ferroviaria Italiana
- Line: Ancona–Lecce (Trenitalia)
- Platforms: 2
- Train operators: Trenitalia

Other information
- Classification: Silver
Location
- Location within Apulia Location within Italy

Molfetta (Italian: Stazione di Molfetta) is a railway station serving Molfetta, in the region of Apulia, southern Italy. The station lies on the Adriatic railway, and is serviced by Trenitalia trains.

== Train services ==
The station is served by the following service(s):

- Intercity services Rome - Foggia - Bari
- Intercity services Bologna - Rimini - Ancona - Pescara - Foggia - Bari - Brindisi - Lecce
- Intercity services Bologna - Rimini - Ancona - Pescara - Foggia - Bari - Taranto
- Night train (Intercity Night) Rome - Foggia - Bari - Brindisi - Lecce
- Night train (Intercity Night) Milan - Parma - Bolgona - Ancona - Pescara - Foggia - Bari - Brindisi - Lecce
- Night train (Intercity Night) Milan - Ancona - Pescara - Foggia - Bari - Taranto - Brindisi - Lecce
- Night train (Intercity Night) Turin - Alessandria - Bolgona - Ancona - Pescara - Foggia - Bari - Brindisi - Lecce
- Regional services (Treno regionale) Foggia - Barletta - Bari

== See also ==
- Railway stations in Italy
- List of railway stations in Apulia
- Rail transport in Italy
- History of rail transport in Italy
