= Ferrovie Appulo Lucane =

Railway company in Italy

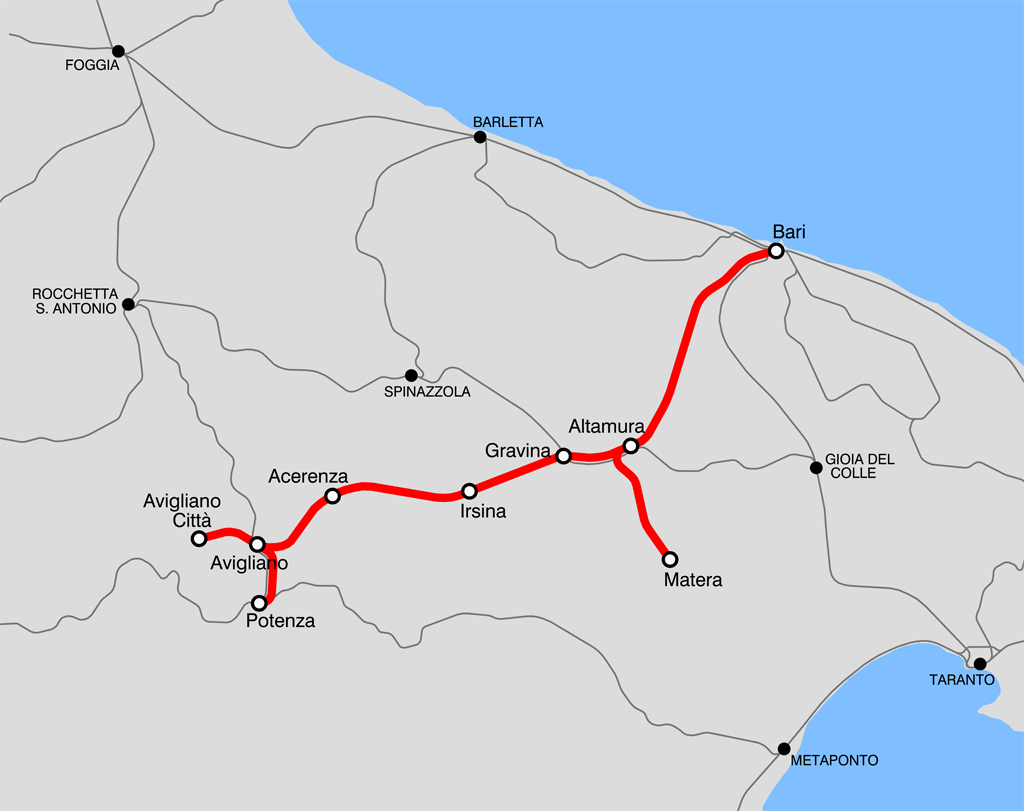
- FAL system map

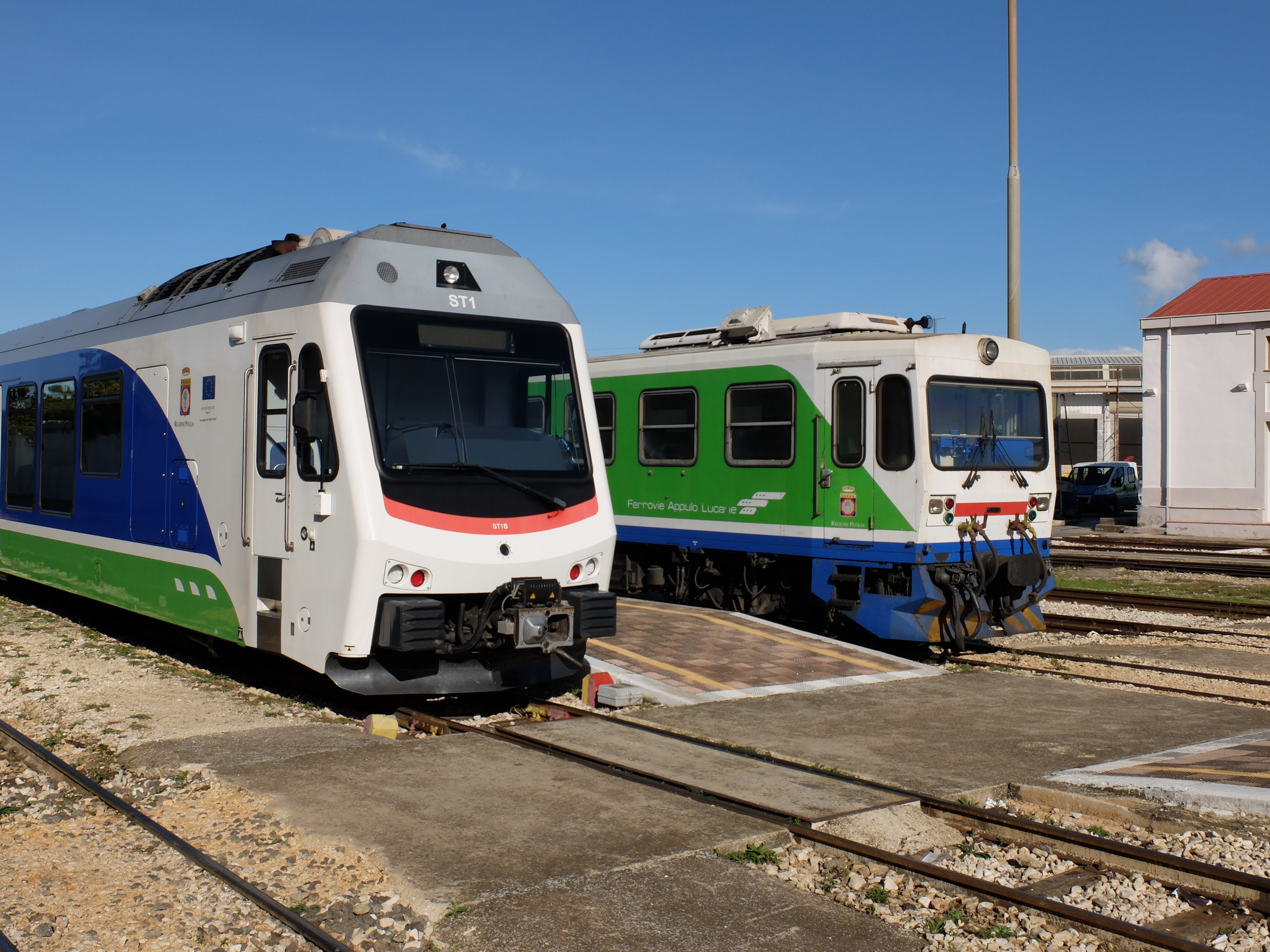
- Two FAL trains at Bari Centrale in 2016

Overview
- Dates of operation: 1991–
- Predecessor: Ferrovie Calabro Lucane

Technical
- Track gauge: 950 mm (3 ft 1 3/8 in)
- Length: 183 kilometres (114 mi)

Ferrovie Appulo Lucane (FAL) is a railway company in Italy. It was created in 1991 when Ferrovie Calabro Lucane was split into two companies, and became fully independent in 2001. It owns and operates 183 kilometres (114 mi) in the regions of Apulia and Basilicata.

== History ==
Ferrovie Calabro Lucane was founded in 1915. The company's network peaked with 765 kilometres (475 mi) of 950 mm (3 ft 1 3/8 in) track. In 1991, Ferrovie Calabro Lucane was split into two companies, Ferrovie Appulo Lucane and Ferrovie della Calabria.

== Lines ==
The FAL's principal line runs 72.6 kilometres (45.1 mi) from Bari Centrale to Matera Sud, in Matera. Another line runs 100 kilometres (62 mi) from Altamura to Potenza. A short 7.7-kilometre (4.8 mi) branch runs from that line west to Avigliano.
