= Bari metropolitan railway service =

Commuter rail service in Bari, Italy

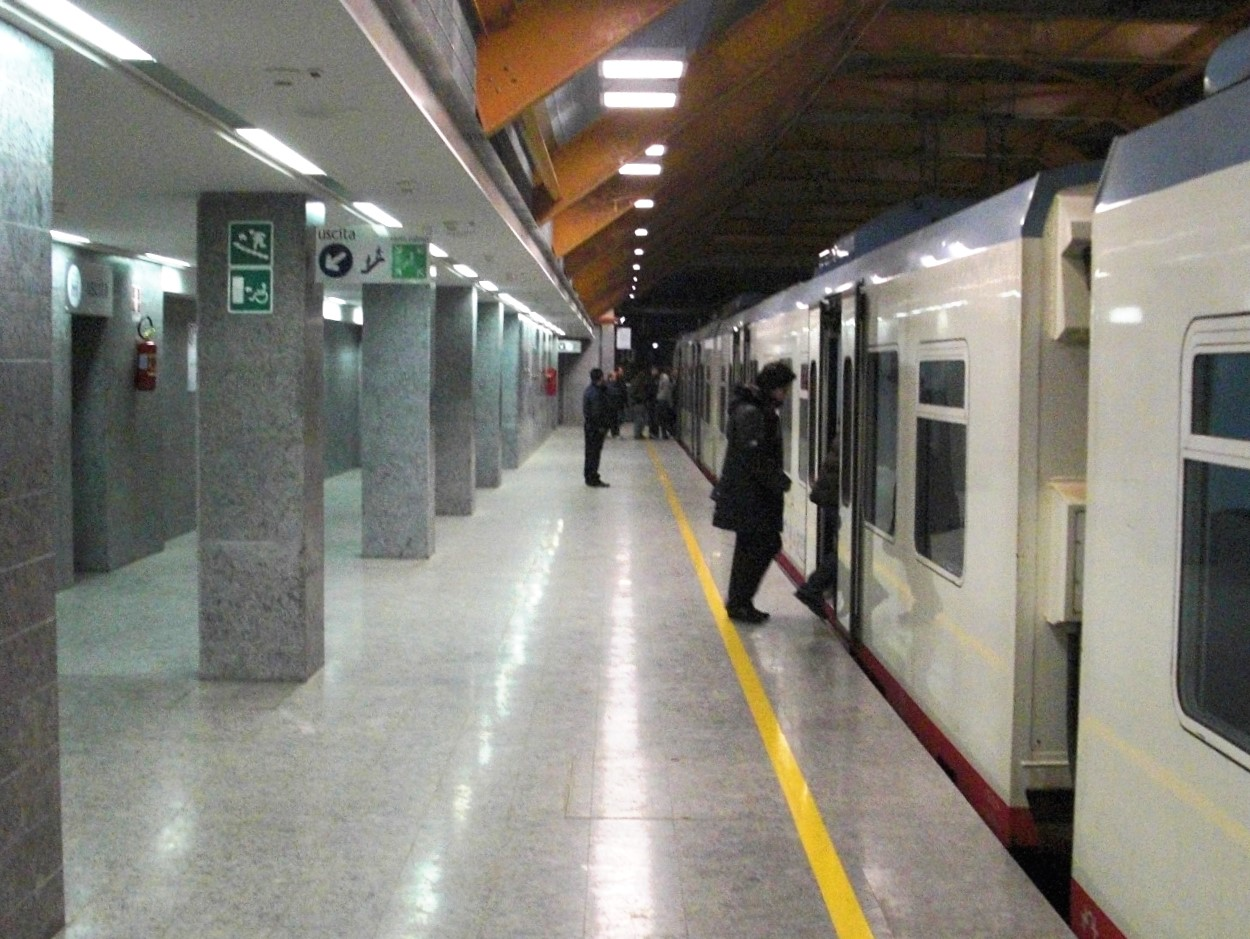
- Train at San Gabriele station

Overview
- Locale: Bari
- Transit type: Commuter rail
- Number of lines: 2
- Number of stations: 13
- Daily ridership: 17,000 daily (2021)

Operation
- Began operation: 24 June 2008
- Operator: Ferrotramviaria
- Number of vehicles: ELT 200

Technical
- Track gauge: 1,435 mm (4 ft 8 1/2 in)
- Electrification: 3 kV, overhead line
System map

The Bari metropolitan railway service is a commuter rail service in the Italian city Bari. It consists of two lines, joining the central railway station, located in the city centre, with the dormitory suburb San Paolo (line FM1) and with the ″Karol Wojtyła″ Airport and the city of Bitonto (line FM2).

The system is operated by Ferrotramviaria. The national railway company Trenitalia also operates an urban railway service between Molfetta and Mola di Bari.

== History ==
The construction of a commuter railway to the dormitory suburb San Paolo was approved by Bari city council in 1999.

The railway line was opened on 24 June 2008, and after test services was opened for public service on 22 December.

On 20 July 2013 the new line FM2 to Bitonto, that also connects the ″Karol Wojtyła″ Airport, has been opened.

== Lines being built ==
Line	Route	Length	Manager
FM3	Central station ↔ Bitritto	13 km	RFI

== See also ==
- List of Bari metropolitan railway stations
