= Fasano railway station =

Railway station in Fasano, Italy

Fasano
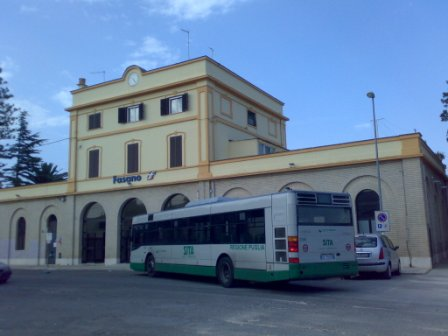

General information
- Location: Fasano; Fasano, Brindisi, Apulia; Italy
- Coordinates: 40°51′05″N 17°23′09″E
- Operator: Rete Ferroviaria Italiana
- Line: Ancona–Lecce (Trenitalia)
- Platforms: 4
- Train operators: Trenitalia

Other information
- Classification: Bronze

History
- Opened: 1866; 160 years ago
Location
- Location within Apulia Location within Italy

Fasano (Italian: Stazione di Fasano) is a railway station near the Italian town of Fasano, in the Province of Brindisi, Apulia. The station lies on the Adriatic Railway (Ancona–Lecce) and was opened in 1866. The train services are operated by Trenitalia.

== Train services ==
The station is served by the following service(s):

- Intercity services Bologna - Rimini - Ancona - Pescara - Foggia - Bari - Brindisi - Lecce
- Night train (Intercity Night) Rome - Foggia - Bari - Brindisi - Lecce
- Night train (Intercity Night) Milan - Parma - Bologna - Ancona - Pescara - Foggia - Bari - Brindisi - Lecce
- Night train (Intercity Night) Turin - Alessandria - Bologna - Ancona - Pescara - Foggia - Bari - Brindisi - Lecce
- Regional services (Treno regionale) Bari - Monopoli - Brindisi - Lecce

== See also ==
- Railway stations in Italy
- List of railway stations in Apulia
- Rail transport in Italy
- History of rail transport in Italy
