= Lecce railway station =

Station in Apulia, Italy

Lecce
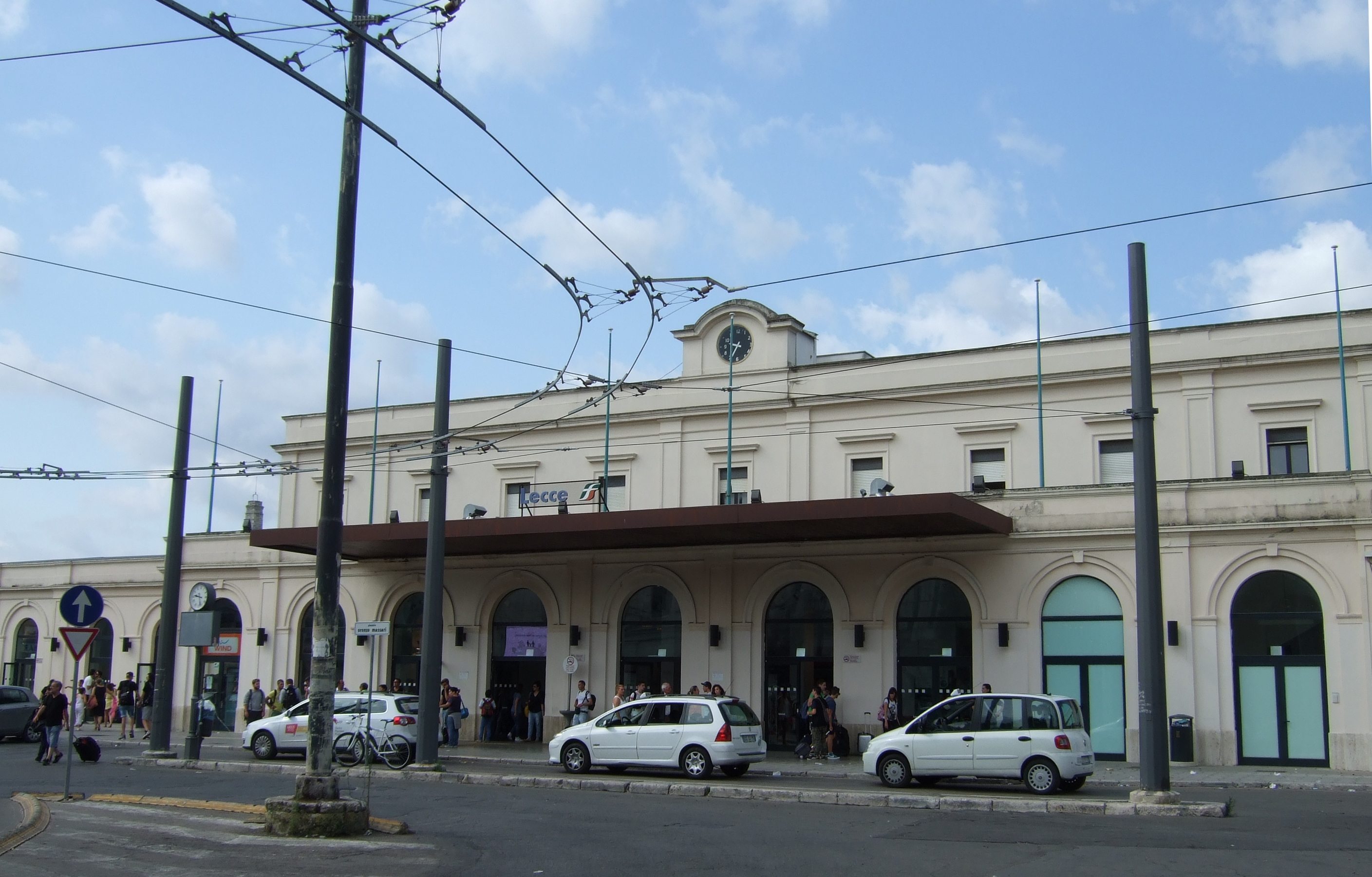

General information
- Location: Piazzale Oronzo Massari; 73100 Lecce LE; Lecce, Lecce, Apulia; Italy
- Coordinates: 40°20′44″N 18°09′58″E
- Operator: Rete Ferroviaria Italiana; Centostazioni
- Lines: Ancona–Lecce (Trenitalia); Martina Franca–Lecce (FSE); Lecce–Otranto (FSE)
- Distance: 797.903 km (495.794 mi) from Bologna Centrale
- Platforms: 8
- Train operators: Trenitalia; Ferrovie del Sud Est (FSE)
- Connections: Lecce trolleybus system, route M1.

Other information
- IATA code: LCZ
- Classification: Gold

History
- Opened: 15 January 1866; 160 years ago
Location
- Location within Apulia Location within Italy

Lecce railway station (Italian: Stazione di Lecce) (IATA: LCZ) serves the city and comune of Lecce, in the region of Apulia, Southern Italy. Opened in 1866, it is the southern terminus of the Adriatic Railway (Ancona–Lecce), and is also the terminus of two regional lines, the Martina Franca–Lecce railway and the Lecce–Otranto railway.

The station is currently managed by Rete Ferroviaria Italiana (RFI). However, the commercial area of the passenger building is managed by Centostazioni. Train services on the Adriatic Railway are operated by or on behalf of Trenitalia. Each of these companies is a subsidiary of Ferrovie dello Stato (FS), Italy's state-owned rail company.

Services on the Martina Franca–Lecce railway and the Lecce–Otranto railway are operated by Ferrovie del Sud Est (FSE).

== Location ==
Lecce railway station is situated at Piazzale Oronzo Massari, a short distance to the south west of the city centre.

== History ==
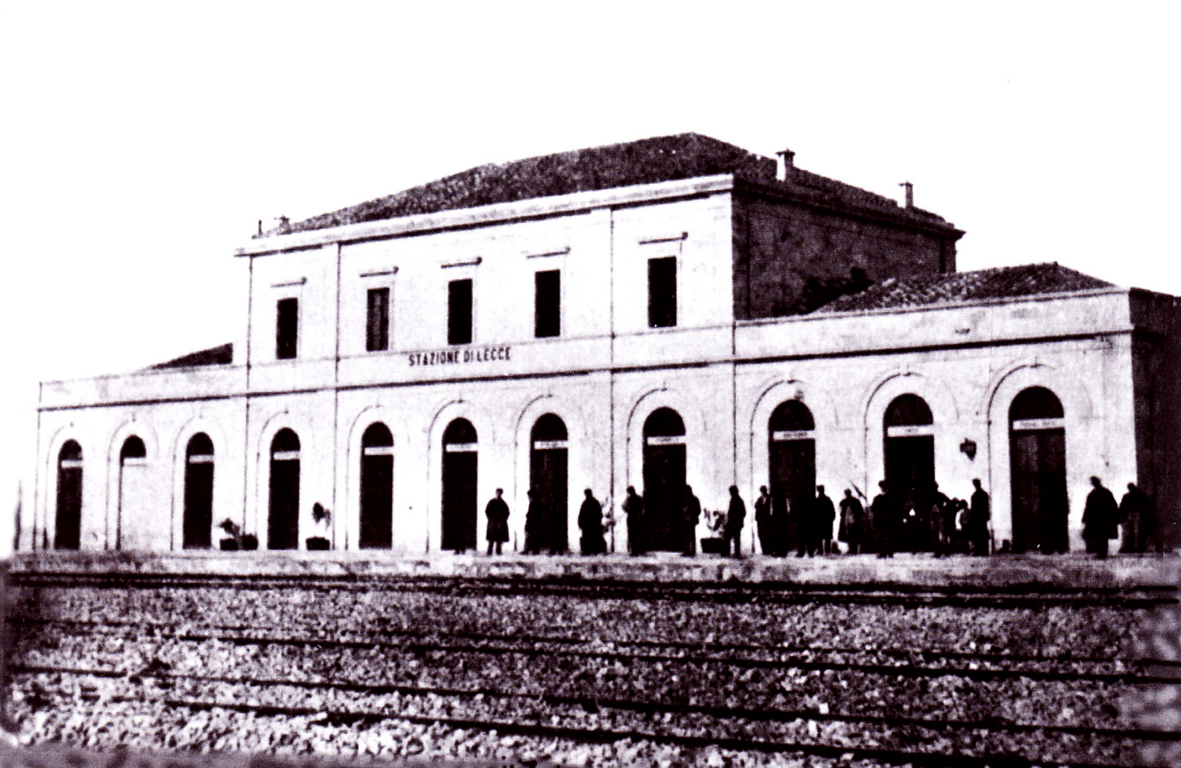
The passenger building in 1866.

The station was opened on 15 January 1866, upon the inauguration of the final section of the Adriatic Railway, between Brindisi and Lecce. It remained a terminal station until 1 February 1868, when a new line was opened between Lecce and Zollino. That line now forms part of the Lecce–Otranto railway.

From the date of its opening until the nationalisation of railways in Italy, the station was operated by the Società per le Strade Ferrate Meridionali (English: Company for the Southern Railways, SFM). It was then taken over by the FS.

On 27 May 1907, the station was linked with Francavilla Fontana, by a railway line built to the Italian narrow gauge of 950 mm (3 ft 1 3/8 in). This line later became the nucleus of the Martina Franca–Lecce railway, operated by the LSE. Since 1933, the Lecce-Maglie-Otranto railway, which serves as an extension of the Adriatic Railway, has also been operated by the LSE.

== Train services ==
Adriatic Railway mainline trains depart from Lecce with destinations including Bari, Rome, Milan, Bologna, Venice and Turin.

The station is also served by regional trains operated by either Trenitalia or the FSE. Destinations linked by regional trains with Lecce include Bari, Foggia, Taranto, Manduria, Gallipoli (Italy), Otranto, Maglie, Santa Maria di Leuca, Novoli, Francavilla Fontana and Martina Franca.

The station is served by the following services:

- High speed services (Frecciargento) Rome - Foggia - Bari - Brindisi - Lecce
- High speed services (Frecciabianca) Milan - Parma - Bologna - Ancona - Pescara - Foggia - Bari - Brindisi - Lecce
- High speed services (Frecciabianca) Turin - Parma - Bologna - Ancona - Pescara - Foggia - Bari - Brindisi - Lecce
- High speed services (Frecciabianca) Venice - Padua - Bologna - Ancona - Pescara - Foggia - Bari - Brindisi - Lecce
- Intercity services Bologna - Rimini - Ancona - Pescara - Foggia - Bari - Brindisi - Lecce
- Night train (Intercity Notte) Rome - Foggia - Bari - Brindisi - Lecce
- Night train (Intercity Notte) Milan - Parma - Bologna - Ancona - Pescara - Foggia - Bari - Brindisi - Lecce
- Night train (Intercity Notte) Milan - Ancona - Pescara - Foggia - Bari - Taranto - Brindisi - Lecce
- Night train (Intercity Notte) Turin - Alessandria - Bologna - Ancona - Pescara - Foggia - Bari - Brindisi - Lecce
- Regional services (Treno regionale) Bari - Monopoli - Brindisi - Lecce
- Local services (Treno regionale) Martina Franca - Francavilla Fontana - Novoli - Lecce
- Local services (Treno regionale) Lecce - Zollino - Nardo - Gallipoli

== See also ==
- History of rail transport in Italy
- List of railway stations in Apulia
- Rail transport in Italy
- Railway stations in Italy
