= Ferrotramviaria =

Ferrotramviaria S.p.A.
- Company type: Società per azioni
- Founded: 1936
- Headquarters: Bari, Italy
- Area served: Apulia, Italy
- Key people: Giuseppe Pavoncelli (President and CEO)
- Products: Passenger railway transport
- Website: ferrovienordbarese.it

Ferrovie del Nord Barese
Overview
- Locale: Apulia, Italy

Technical
- Electrification: 3 kV DC, overhead lines

Other
- Website: ferrovienordbarese.it

Ferrotramviaria is a private railway company of Italy. Based in Bari, in the Apulia region, it manages the Ferrovie del Nord Barese network, composed by the Bari–Barletta railway and the Bari metropolitan railway service.

== Railway services ==
Line network

Ferrotramviaria operates two railway lines on the network of Ferrovie del Nord Barese:

- Bari–Barletta railway, opened in 1965, former known as Ferrovia Bari Nord;
- Bari metropolitan railway service, opened in 2008, also known as Metropolitana San Paolo.

On the network are two commuter lines (FM 1 and FM 2) and two regional lines (FR 1 and FR 2) in service.

The company also has two locomotives used on freight services along the Adriatic coast.

== Rolling stock ==
Class	Image	Cars per set	Type	Top speed		Number	Builder	Built
Class	Image	Cars per set	Type	km/h	mph	Number	Builder	Built
EL 01-12		1	Electric multiple unit	110	68	12	Stanga, TIBB, Casaralta	1963-1964, 1980
EL 13-15		1	Electric multiple unit	130	81	3	Firema, ABB	1995
ELT 200	Bari - stazione ferroviaria FT - elettrotreno ELT.212	3 or 4	Electric multiple unit	130	81	12	Alstom	2005, 2008
ETR 341 & 342		4	Electric multiple unit	160	99	4	Stadler	2008, 2009
ETR 452	FT-ETR452 TR04+ETR452 TR03+ELT 202-PresentazioneCivity-BariCentrale-Bari-2014-12-18-IannelliGiorgio-02	4	Electric multiple unit	160	99	2 (3)	CAF	2014 (due 2015)
E.483		N/A	Electric locomotive	140	87	2	Bombardier	2013
De 02		N/A	Diesel locomotive	30	19	1	Stanga, TIBB	1968
