= Adriatic railway =

Key eastern Italian transport link

Adriatic railway (Ancona–Lecce)
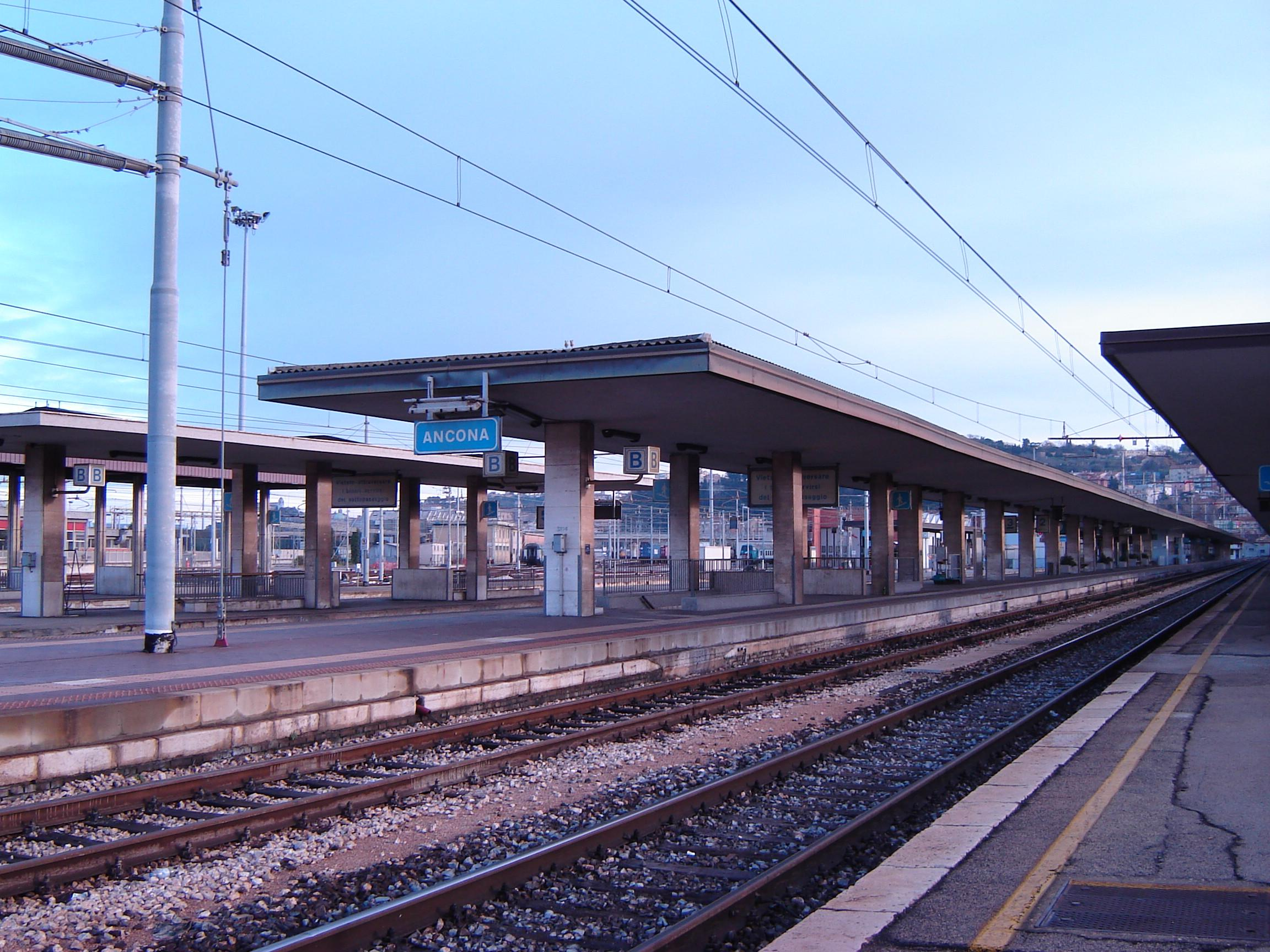
- Ancona railway station

Overview
- Status: Operational
- Line number: 103, 104, 132, 133
- Locale: Apulia, South-East Italy
- Termini: Ancona railway station; Lecce railway station

Service
- System: Rete Ferroviaria Italiana (RFI)
- Operator(s): Ferrovie del Sud Est

History
- Opened: 1860

Technical
- Line length: 594 km (369 mi)
- Number of tracks: Double track
- Track gauge: 1,435 mm (4 ft 8 1/2 in) standard gauge
- Electrification: Electrified at 3000 V DC

The Adriatic railway (Italian: Ferrovia Adriatica) is the railway from Ancona to Lecce that runs along the Adriatic Coast of Italy, following it almost all of the way. It is one of the main lines of the Italian rail system and links the northern cities with the most important productive areas of central and southern Italy.

The railway was built by the Società per le Strade Ferrate Meridionali (Italian: Company for the Southern Railways, SFM), between 1863 and 1872. In 1906, management of the line was taken over by Ferrovie dello Stato Italiane. In 1933, the southernmost Lecce-Otranto segment of the line was turned over to the Ferrovie del Sud Est, which has maintained it to the present day.

== History ==
Shortly after the proclamation of the Kingdom of Italy, the new government took over the granting of railway concessions, which, in prior years, had often been doled out in a haphazard manner by the different states and provisional dictatorial governments of the Italian Peninsula to various companies: canceling some, changing others and continually releasing new rights-of-way.

In November 1861 the Milan–Bologna railway line began operation, with the connection of the Milan-Piacenza line to the Piacenza-Bologna via a bridge – initially of wood but later replaced by an iron structure – across the river Po. This allowed trains from Turin and France to travel directly to the Adriatic coast along the Ancona-Bologna line, which itself had been built in November 1861 by the SFR, in what was then the Papal States.

The construction of an Adriatic line had long been desired, but had never come to pass: mainly because of the difficulty in reconciling the needs of the two countries – the Papal States and the Kingdom of the Two Sicilies – through whose territories the line would pass. The constitution of the kingdom of Italy in 1860 brought a resolution to this dilemma, and, as entrepreneurs in Piedmont and Lombardy desired access to Adriatic ports for closer and easier trade with Asia through the Suez Canal, construction would proceed rapidly following unification.

As early as May 1861, a detailed and complex feasibility study was presented to the Chamber of Deputies for new railways in southern Italy that were considered of vital importance. In particular, the construction of a railway along the Adriatic coast from Ancona to Brindisi and Otranto was seen as essential, as these ports were considered by many to be on the verge of becoming Europe's "door to the East." At that time, several European countries were competing for the privilege of transporting the Imperial Indian Mail train (referred to in Italy as the Valigia delle Indie), in hopes of sharing in the profits of the trade between England and its vast colonial empire. In July 1862, Count Pietro Bastogi, former Finance Minister of the Kingdom of Italy succeeded in putting together a consortium of 92 bankers with the huge sum (at that time) of 100 million gold lire of capital from entirely Italian sources. The Società per le Strade Ferrate Meridionali (Italian: 'Company for the Southern Railways', SFM) moved quickly to build the rail line, completing the Brindisi-Lecce segment by 1866. The Lecce-Otranto segment was delayed by bitter controversies which prevented the choice of a route for many years. The last stretch of 19 miles from Maglie to Otranto was not complete until 20 September 1872.

The new Adriatic Railway allowed, for the first time, relatively rapid travel between the south and the north-central regions of Italy. In 1866, in fact, there were no railways on the Tyrrhenian coast south of Eboli. Vittorio Emanuele II on 9 November 1863 inaugurated the line with his train ride from Pescara to Foggia, following hurried work to finish the track. The public opening was postponed until 25 April 1864. In the proceedings of the first legislature of the Kingdom of Italy, the parliamentarian Leopoldo Galeotti wrote hopefully that "before long the port of Brindisi, reborn to a new life, will bring within her breast the Indian Mail, a sure sign that the commerce of the world will be drawn a second time to our seas. In a few days, thanks to the great industry of Southern Company, despite the obstacles of every kind that had to be overcome, locomotives will arrive at the port of Brindisi." In September 1871 the completion of the Fréjus Rail Tunnel allowed the luxury Peninsular Express (from the same company that operated the famous Orient Express) to complete the London-Brindisi trip in 47 hours via Calais and Paris.

The line was built in record time using the easiest and least demanding engineering methods (tunnels and viaducts), often near the sea. Weather was a significant cause of work interruptions, due to the heavy storms that frequently batter the Adriatic coast.

=== 21st century: Double track ===
The line was reoriented in 2004, with double tracking, for the stretch from Lesina to Apricena (saving about 2.5 km), while at the end of 2005, the railway between Ortona and Vasto Casalbordino and between the Port of Vasto and Vasto / San Salvo were also realigned; for the dual purpose of eliminating the multiple curves in the old section, and reducing the danger posed by storm surges and coastal erosion.

Between 2002 and 2006 the track between Brindisi and Lecce was doubled, followed by the segment between Bari Centrale and Fasano. In 2007 the segment between San Severo and Apricena was also given double track.

The only stretch of the Adriatic line that remains single track is from Termoli to Lesina, which is the bottleneck of the line.

== Features ==
A notable aspect of the Adriatic line is the almost total absence of tunnels, with the exception of the Pescara-Vasto segment, where there are seven, including three with a length greater than 5000 m. The railway is almost entirely double track, and is DC electrified to 3000 V.

== Developments ==
In 2023, Rete Ferroviaria Italiana has estimated the cost of a new Bologna-Ancona-Pescara-Foggia-Bari high-speed line, with trains travelling at up to 300 kilometres per hour, at between EUR 40 and 50 billion. By contrast, the cost of speeding up the existing line, with trains travelling up to 200 kilometres per hour, amounts to EUR 5 billion.

== See also ==
- List of railway lines in Italy
- History of railways in Italy
