= Crotto =

Crotto may refer to:

- Crotto (architecture), a dome-shaped construction in Switzerland and Italy

Crotto is also an Italian surname. It may refer to the following:

- Giuseppe Crotto (1830-1903), Italian merchant and landowner
- José Camilo Crotto (1863-1936), Argentine politician
- Rachel Crotto (born 1958), American chess player
