= Azura, Numidia =

Ancient town in Roman North Africa

Azura was an ancient civitas and bishopric in Roman North Africa. It remains only as Latin Catholic titular see.

== History ==
Azura was one of many cities of sufficient importance in the Roman(-Berber) province of Numidia to become a suffragan. The town was located near present-day Henchir-Loulou (itself a former Roman city and bishopric, Rotaria), Algeria.

== Bishopric ==
Azura did not send a representative to the Council of Nicaea nor Chalcedon.

As a bishopric, Azura was represented by the Catholic bishop Victor at the Conference of Carthage (411), where the Catholics declared the schismatic Donatist bishops heretics.

Its bishop Leporius was among the Catholic bishops whom the Arian king Huneric of the Vandal Kingdom summoned to Carthage in 484 and was then exiled, like most Catholics.

== Titular see ==
The diocese of Azura was nominally restored in 1933 as Latin Titular bishopric of Azura (Latin = Curiate Italian) / Azuen(sis) (Latin adjective).

It has had the following incumbents, so far of the fitting Episcopal (lowest) rank:

- Afonso Maria Ungarelli, Sacred Heart Missionaries (M.S.C.) (1948.11.13 – death 1988.05.23) first as Apostolic Administrator of Territorial Prelature of Pinheiro (Brazil; now a diocese) (1940 – 1948.11.13), then as Bishop-Prelate of Pinheiro (1948.11.13 – 1975.03.01), as Apostolic Administrator of Territorial Prelature of Cândido Mendes (now Diocese of Zé Doca, Brazil) (1963 – 1965.12.20) and finally as emeritate
- Edward Dajczak (1989.12.15 – 2007.06.23) as Auxiliary Bishop of Diocese of Zielona Góra–Gorzów (Poland) (1989.12.15 – 2007.06.23); next Bishop of Koszalin–Kołobrzeg (Poland) (2007.06.23 – ...)
- António José da Rocha Couto, S.M.P. (2007.07.06 – 2011.11.19) as Auxiliary Bishop of Archdiocese of Braga (Portugal) (2007.07.06 – 2011.11.19); previously Superior General of Portuguese Missionary Society (S.M.P.) (2002.07.29 – 2007.07.06); later Bishop of Lamego (Portugal) (2011.11.19 – ...)

BIOS TO ELABORATE

- Titular Bishop Gaétan Proulx, Servites (O.S.M.) (2011.12.12 – 2016.07.02)
- Titular Bishop is Mexican-born Jorge Humberto Rodríguez-Novelo, of Denver.

== See also ==
- Catholic dioceses in Algeria
- Catholic Church in Algeria

== Sources and external links ==
- Gcatholic
