= Ivan Šaško =

Croatian prelate

Monsignor Ivan Šaško
- Auxiliary bishop of Zagreb
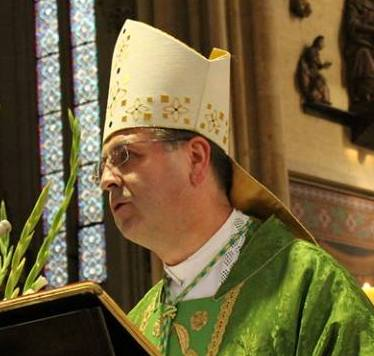
- Archdiocese: Roman Catholic Archdiocese of Zagreb
- See: Zagreb
- Appointed: 11 February 2008
- Installed: 29 March 2008
- Other post: Titular Bishop of Rotaria (2008-)

Orders
- Ordination: 28 June 1992 by Franjo Kuharic
- Consecration: 29 March 2008 by Josip Bozanic

Personal details
- Born: Ivan Šaško; 1 August 1966 (age 60) Ðivan near Vrbovec, PR Croatia, FPR Yugoslavia (modern Croatia)
- Denomination: Roman Catholic
- Education: Pontifical Gregorian University; Pontifical Atheneum of St. Anselm
- Motto: In novitate vitae In newness of life (Romans 6:4)
- Coat of arms

Ivan Šaško (born 1 August 1966, in Ðivan near Vrbovec) is a Croatian prelate of the Roman Catholic Church who serves as Auxiliary bishop of the Roman Catholic Archdiocese of Zagreb since March 29, 2008.

== Early life and education ==
Ivan Šaško was born in a small village of Ðivan near Vrbovec on 1 August 1966 to Stjepan and Ljubica Šaško. He attended the first two classes of the elementary school in Banovo, and finished it at Vrbovec in the year 1981. After graduation, he attended minor seminary in Zagreb. He graduated from the Interdiocese Preparatory Seminary in 1985 after which he went to serve conscription in the army. In the autumn of 1986, Šaško entered major seminary and started the study of theology and philosophy at the Catholic Theological Faculty of the University of Zagreb. Upon completion of the second year of study in 1988, Šaško went to Rome to the Pontifical Atheneum of St. Anselm, where he stayed until 1994 and continued his studies at the Pontifical Gregorian University, from which he graduated in 1991. In the same year, he was ordained a deacon for the Archdiocese of Zagreb and began postgraduate studies and specialization in the liturgy at the Pontifical Atheneum of St. Anselm. On 28 June 1992, Šaško was ordained a priest for the Archdiocese of Zagreb by Cardinal Franjo Kuharić. He gained his Master's degree on 10 June 1994. That same year he became a member of the Pontifical Croatian College of St. Jerome and continued writing a doctoral dissertation. Šaško successfully defended a dissertation on 28 November 1997, with the thesis Dona, munera, sancta sacrifício - and omnibus ... facere digneris: dinamismo pneumatologici part Canone Romano. Ricerca e proposta per una rilettura teologico-liturgica.

== Career ==
In 1996 Šaško came back to Croatia and started working as an assistant in the Department of the liturgy of the Zagreb Catholic Theological Faculty. From the year 2000 he worked as docent in the same department. From 2002 to 2007, he was head of the Department of the liturgy. From 2001 he is a member of the Assembly of prebendaries of the Zagreb cathedral. In 2008 he was appointed canon of the Cathedral Kaptol of Zagreb. In January 2005 he was appointed President of the Commission for the establishment of the Catholic University of Croatia, and still today, after the University opening in 2006, continues as the President of the Commission of the University. In April 2005 he was elected associate professor in the Department of the liturgy of Zagreb Catholic Theological Faculty. He is member of the editorial board of the scientific journal Bogoslovska smotra. In October 2005, Šaško participated in the IX Regular General Synod of Bishops in the Vatican, in a group of Assistants to the Special Secretary of the Synod. During three pastoral visits of Pope John Paul II to Croatia, he was one of those responsible for the preparation of liturgical celebrations.

On 11 February 2008, Pope Benedict XVI appointed Šaško auxiliary bishop of Zagreb and titular Bishop of Rotary. Cardinal Josip Bozanić ordained him on 29 March 2008.
