= Rotăria =

Rotaria or Rotăria may refer to:

- Rotăria, a village in Motoșeni Commune, Bacău County, Romania
- Rotăria, a village in Ciortești Commune, Iași County, Romania
- Rotaria (diocese), ancient bishopric in Numidia, North Africa
