= Bombette =

Italian fresh pork meat rolls

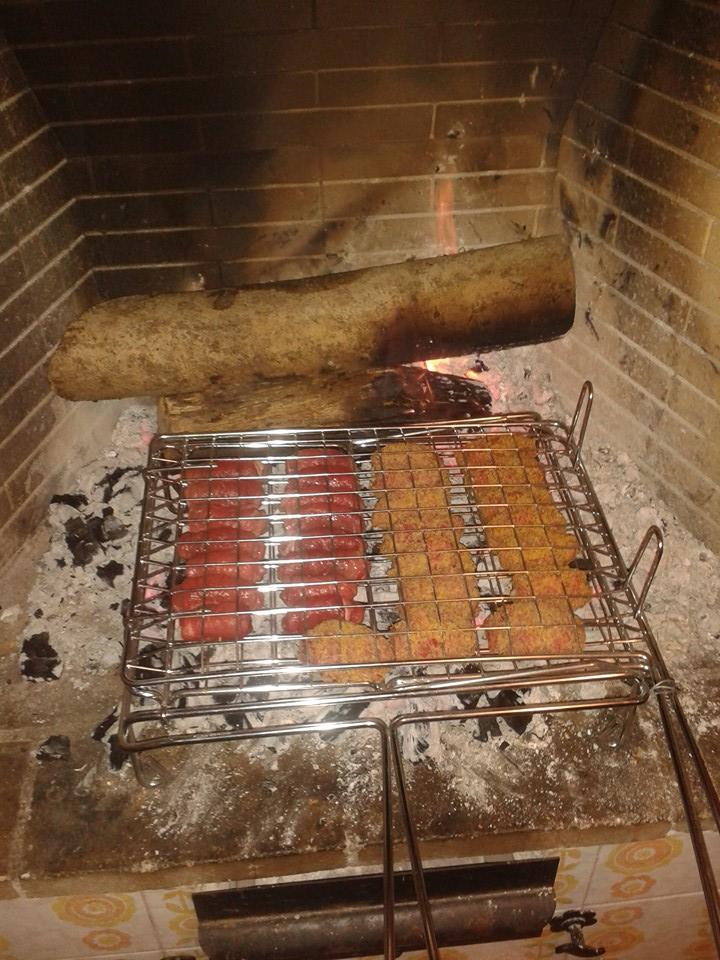
- Region or state: Apulia

Bombette ([bomˈbette]; singular bombetta) are fresh pork meat rolls usually stuffed with cheese, salt and pepper, traditionally spread all over Apulia and prepared in the whole territory of Valle d'Itria (in particular Martina Franca, Cisternino and Locorotondo, as well as spread in most of the provinces of Taranto and Brindisi with recipes varying from place to place).

== Name origin ==
The literal translation of bombette is "little bombs".

The name refers to the rounded shape and small size of these rolls, as well as to their filling which creates a real "explosion" of flavour.

== Preparation ==
Bombette are prepared with selected slices of pork capocollo (coppa); the slices of meat are placed on a cutting board and usually stuffed with Apulian canestrato cheese, salt and pepper, then rolled up and closed manually until creating a real "bundle", sometimes parsley is added. The rolls thus obtained can be cooked on the grill or even in the oven.

== Variants ==
There are many variations of this speciality, whose recipes are often jealously and secretly guarded by individual butchers, originating a wide variety of bombette made by the "house". Among the most common ones there are some without any filling, simply seasoned with salt and pepper, or some others wrapped with a slice of bacon, some containing ham instead of minced meat or others with a spicy filling often called "Mexican bombette".
