= Martino Scarafile =

Italian bishop

- Bishop of Castellaneta
- Church: Catholic Church
- Diocese: Diocese of Castellaneta
- In office: 31 October 1985 – 14 February 2003
- Predecessor: Ennio Appignanesi
- Successor: Pietro Maria Fragnelli
- Previous posts: Titular Bishop of Rotaria (1980-1985); Auxiliary Bishop of Conversano (1980-1985)

Orders
- Ordination: 23 July 1950
- Consecration: 6 January 1981 by Pope John Paul II

Personal details
- Born: 1 July 1927 Cisternino, Province of Brindisi, Kingdom of Italy
- Died: 27 December 2011 (aged 84)

Martino Scarafile (1 July 1927 – 27 December 2011) was the Catholic bishop of the Diocese of Castellaneta, Italy.

Ordained to the priesthood in 1950, Scarafile was named bishop in 1980. He retired in 2003.
