= Catholic University of Croatia =

Private university of the Catholic Church in Zagreb, Croatia

- Seal of Catholic University of Croatia
- Motto: Lux Vera (Latin); Svjetlo Istinsko (Croatian)
- Motto in English: The True Light
- Type: Private
- Established: June 3, 2006; 20 years ago
- Founder: Archdiocese of Zagreb
- Religious affiliation: Catholic
- Chancellor: Josip Bozanić
- Rector: Željko Tanjić
- Vice-Rectors: List: Hrvoje Štefančić, PhD (Vice-Rector for International Relations); Gordan Črpić, PhD (Vice-Rector for Organisation and Financial Affairs); Roberto Antolović, PhD (Vice-Rector for Science); Roko Mišetić, PhD (Vice-Rector for Academic Affairs)
- Faculty: 75
- Students: c. 1200
- Location: Zagreb, Croatia; 45.8140°N 15.9444°E
- Campus: Urban
- Colors
- Website: http://www.unicath.hr/eng unicath.hr

Catholic University of Croatia (Croatian: Hrvatsko katoličko sveučilište; Latin: Universitas Studiorum Catholica Croatica) is a private university of the Catholic Church in Croatia located in Zagreb, Croatia.

== History ==
On October 12, 2004, the Croatian Bishops' Conference, on its 29th plenary session, held in Zadar, adopted a Decision on the Establishment of the Catholic University of Croatia. The decision stipulated that the founder of the university was to be the Archdiocese of Zagreb and its sponsor the Croatian Bishops' Conference.

On January 6, 2005, Archbishop Josip Bozanić established the Commission for the Establishment of the Catholic University of Croatia, whose mission was to prepare the establishment of the university. On January 7, 2005, Bozanić appointed five members to the commission. The commission completed its task on June 3, 2006, when Bozanić officially established the university with the publication of the "Decree on the Establishment of the Catholic University of Croatia-Luce Vera Illuminata" (Illuminated with the True Light) and "Instruction for the Establishment" (no. 1273-2/2006). The Commission for the Establishment became the Commission of the Croatian Catholic University. It had to prepare a study for the launch of the university. Bishop Ivan Šaško, a professor at the Catholic Faculty of Theological of the University of Zagreb, was appointed interim rector.

On June 6, 2006, the Archdiocese of Zagreb and the Croatian government signed an agreement on the exchange of property according to which the archdiocese was given the premises of the former military compound in Črnomerec in exchange of its properties in Vlaška street that were confiscated after the World War II by the Yugoslav government.

On July 3, 2008, the Ministry of Science, Education and Sports issued a license to the university to offer programs in psychology, sociology, and history and with equal conditions of employment for five years.

The university premises were blessed on September 19, 2008, by the Cardinal Secretary of State Tarcisio Bertone. On that occasion, Bozanić explained the reasons for the establishment of the university: "The basis for the establishment of this University is a commitment of the Catholic Church to assist the Croatian system of higher education while carrying out its mission and to streamline its opportunities in the social space because the Church believes that it's very important, and for that there were no preconditions in the past decades. We are aware that the Church and the Gospel have a lot to say about university life."

During his visit to Croatia on June 4, 2011, Pope Benedict XVI called the establishment of the university to be a "sign of hope".

Teaching in the undergraduate university study of history began in the 2010–2011 academic year. Teaching in the undergraduate university studies of psychology and sociology began in the 2012–2013 academic year. Teaching in the graduate university study of history began in the 2013–2014 academic year.

In September 2011, the founder appointed Prof Željko Tanjić, PhD, Rector ad interim since Msgr. Ivan Šaško, PhD, became Auxiliary Bishop of Zagreb in the meantime. Prof Željko Tanjić, PhD, was elected Rector in the first term in 2016 and in the second term in 2020.

In March 2013, the Ministry of Science, Education and Sports granted the university a license for programmes in history, sociology, and psychology.

The first generation of undergraduate history students graduated on 15 March 2014.

In July 2014, the Ministry of Science, Education and Sports granted the Catholic University of Croatia a license for research activities in the field of social sciences and humanities.

In March 2015, the Catholic University of Croatia was granted a license for undergraduate and graduate programmes in communication sciences by the Ministry of Science, Education and Sports.

In October 2015, the Ministry of Science, Education and Sports issued a license for research activities in the field of biomedicine and healthcare to the Catholic University of Croatia, and in November 2015 a licence for an undergraduate and graduate programme in nursing.

Teaching in the communication sciences and nursing programmes began in the 2015–2016 academic year.

In October 2019, the Ministry of Science and Education granted the Catholic University of Croatia a licence to offer a two-subject undergraduate programme in history.

In September 2020, the Ministry of Science and Education issued a licence to the Catholic University of Croatia to offer a two-subject graduate programme in sociology.

In June 2020, the Ministry of Science and Education granted the Catholic University of Croatia a license to offer an integrated undergraduate and graduate programme in medicine.

Since the 2019–2020 academic year, the Catholic University of Croatia has implemented two postgraduate university (doctoral) studies in the fields of humanities and social sciences: postgraduate university study of History and postgraduate university study of Sociology: Values, Identity and Social Changes in Croatian Society.

In 2016, the Catholic University of Croatia awarded its first honorary doctorate to Cardinal Gerhard Ludwig Müller.

Since 2012, Day of the Catholic University of Croatia has been marked by a lectio magistralis held by Raffaele Cardinal Farina in 2012, Péter Cardinal Erdő in 2013, Zenon Cardinal Grocholewski in 2014, George Cardinal Pell in 2015, Robert Cardinal Sarah in 2016, Pietro Parolin in 2017 and Prof Isabel Maria de Oliveira Capeloa Gil, PhD, Rector of the Catholic University of Portugal and President of the International Federation of Catholic Universities, in 2019.

== Academic activity ==
The first academic year began in 2010/2011 when 40 students enrolled in the first year of the history program. In October 2011, the university started its programs in psychology and sociology. The first graduates of the undergraduate program in history graduated in 2014.

In July 2014 University received accreditation for scientific activity in the field of social sciences and humanities. In the 2015/2016 academic year, the university launched its program in communicology and nursing.

in September 2021 university started the program in medicine.

The university annually accepts 40 full-time students per program and currently has around 1,300 students.

== Faculties of study ==
The university offers B.A. and M.A. degrees in:

- History
- Psychology
- Sociology
- Communicology
- Nursing
- Medicine
