= Alberobello =

Town in Apulia, Italy

- Comune
- Comune di Alberobello
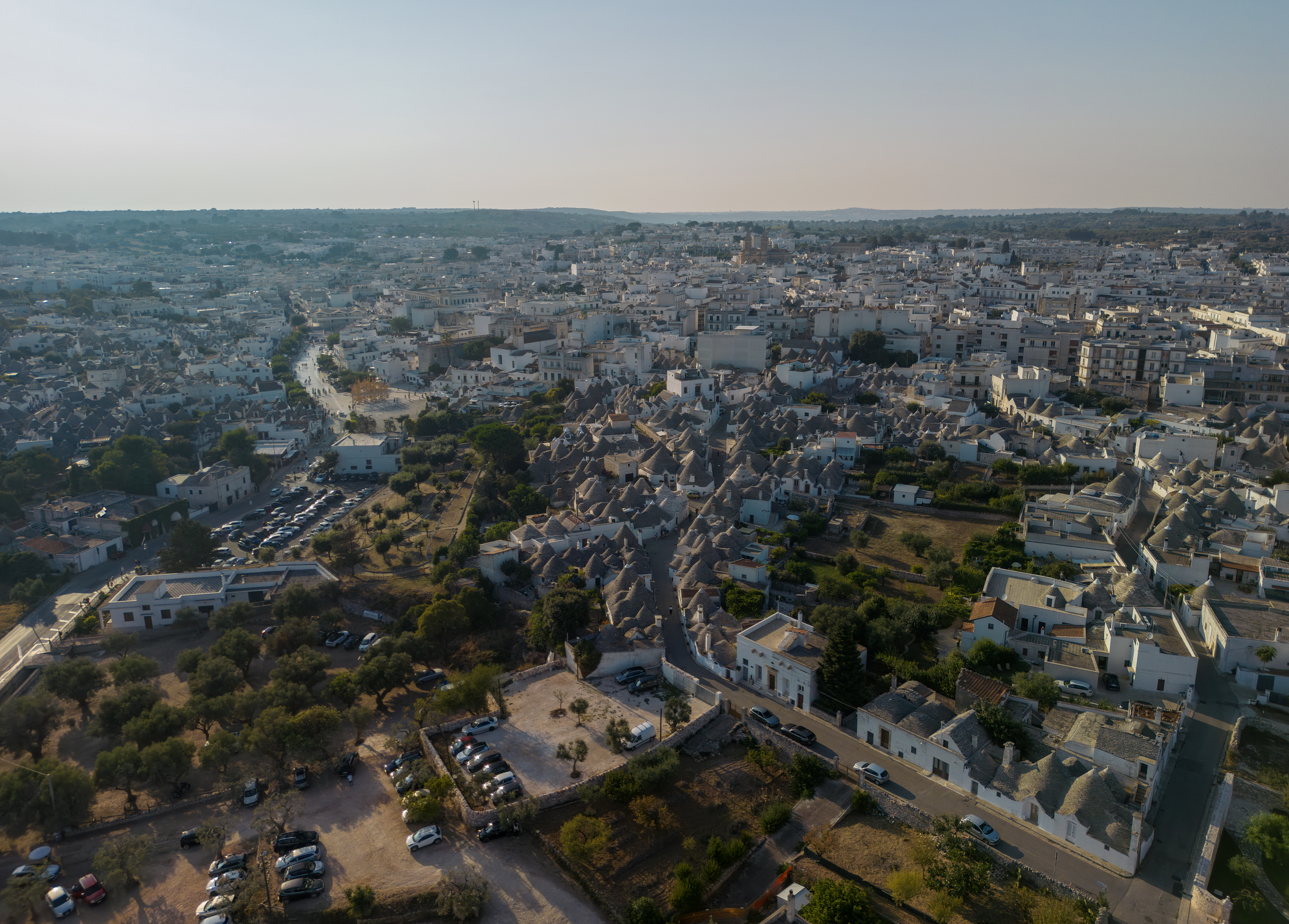
- Alberobello

- Coat of arms

- Location within Italy Location within Apulia
- Coordinates: 40°47′N 17°14′E
- Country: Italy
- Region: Apulia
- Metropolitan city: Bari (BA)
- Frazioni: Coreggia (Original name Correggia), the one frazione of Alberobello since 1894

Government
  - Mayor: Francesco De Carlo

Area
  - Total: 40.82 km^{2} (15.76 sq mi)
- Elevation: 402.5 m (1,321 ft)

Population (31 August 2022)
  - Total: 10,237
  - Density: 250.8/km^{2} (649.5/sq mi)
- Demonym: Alberobellese(i)
- Time zone: UTC+1 (CET)
  - Summer (DST): UTC+2 (CEST)
- Postal code: 70011
- Dialing code: 080
- Patron saint: Saints Cosmas and Damian
- Saint day: 25-26-27-28 September
- Website: Official website

UNESCO World Heritage Site
- Official name: The Trulli of Alberobello
- Criteria: Cultural: iii, iv, v
- Reference: 787
- Inscription: 1996 (20th Session)
- Area: 10.52 ha (26.0 acres)

Alberobello (Italian: [ˌalberoˈbɛllo]; literally "beautiful tree"; Barese: Ajarubbédde) is a small town and comune of the Metropolitan City of Bari, Apulia, southern Italy. It has 10,237 inhabitants (2022) and is famous for its unique trullo buildings. The trulli of Alberobello have been designated as a UNESCO World Heritage Site since 1996. Alberobello is one of I Borghi più belli d'Italia ("The most beautiful villages of Italy").

== History ==
The first occupation of the area started only in the early sixteenth century on the impulse of the Count of Conversano Andrea Matteo III Acquaviva d'Aragona. He allowed about forty peasant families from Noci to settle here and cultivate the land, with an obligation to give him a tenth of their crops.

In 1635 his successor, Count Giangirolamo II (1600–1665) erected an inn with a tavern and an oratory and started the urbanization of the forest with the construction of few small houses. The expansion of the urban area was helped, firstly by the abundance of calcareous sedimentary limestone from the surrounding karst landscape, and secondly, by the requirement of the Count to build houses only with dry stone walls without the use of mortar, which would become the peculiar trulli. This obligation to have houses built from drystone only, was an expedient of the Count to avoid paying taxes to the Spanish Viceroy of the Kingdom of Naples. The centre of Alberobello was built on the course of the ancient river Cana, which is now followed by Largo Giuseppe Martelotta, the main street of the town.

Alberobello remained a fief of the Acquaviva of Aragon until 27 May 1797, when King Ferdinand IV of Bourbon elevated the small village to the royal city, freeing it from the feudal servitude of the counts. On 22 June 1797, the first mayor Francesco Giuseppe Lippolis was elected.

Alberobello is the only inhabited centre with an entire district of trulli, and is considered to be the cultural capital of the trulli of the Itria Valley.

== The trulli of Alberobello ==
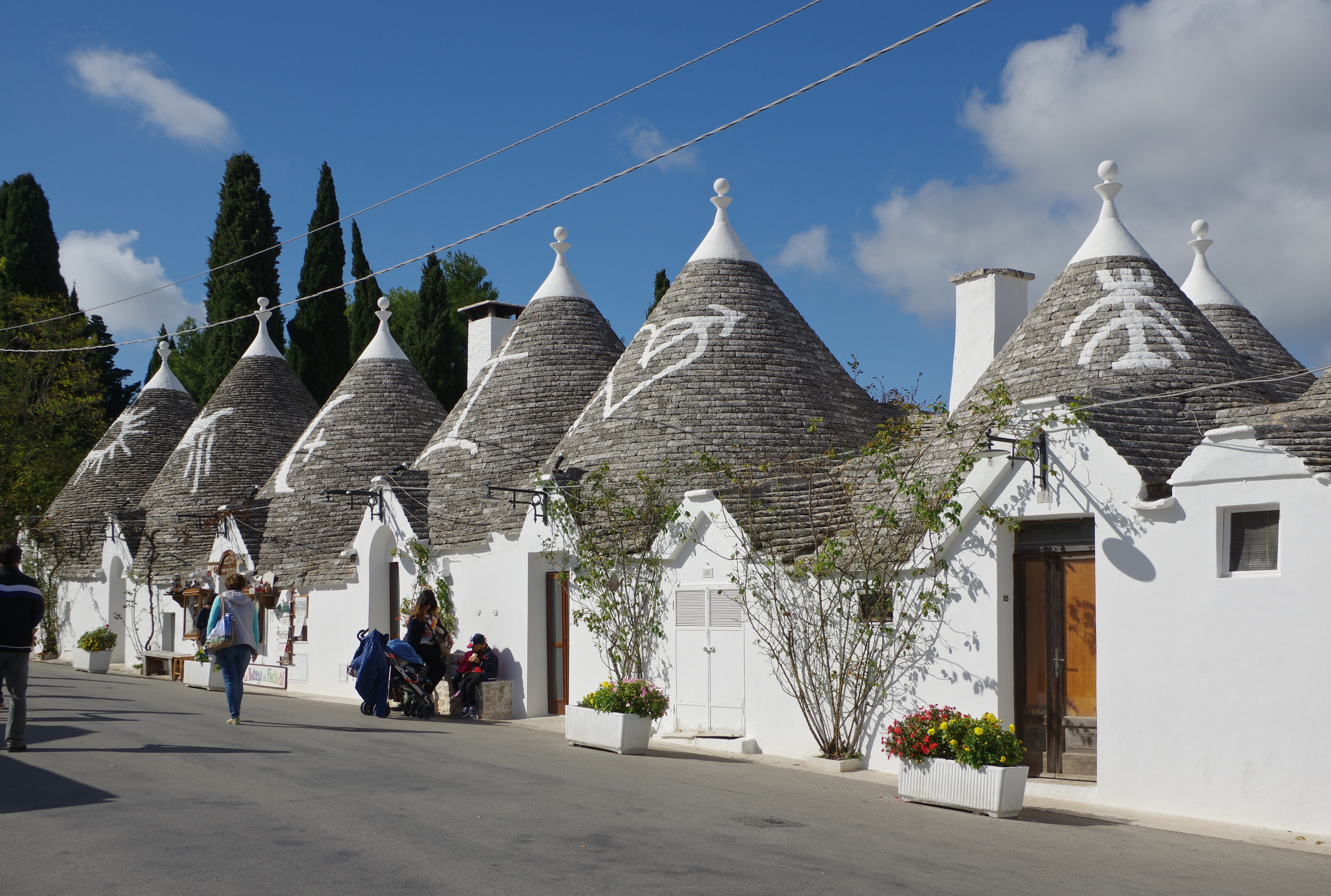
Row of trullo houses in Monte Pertica street in Alberobello

The history of the trulli (from Ancient Greek τρούλλοι) is linked to the Prammatica De Baronibus, an edict of the 15th-century Kingdom of Naples that subjected every new settlement to a tribute. In 1481 the Counts of Conversano D'Acquaviva D'Aragona from 1481, owners of the territory of Alberobello, then imposed on the residents that they built their dwellings dry, without using mortars, so that they could be configured as precarious buildings and easily demolished.

Having to use only stones, the peasants found in the round form with self-supporting domed roof the simplest configuration. The roofs were embellished with decorative pinnacles representing the signature of the architect (master trullaro).

== International relations ==
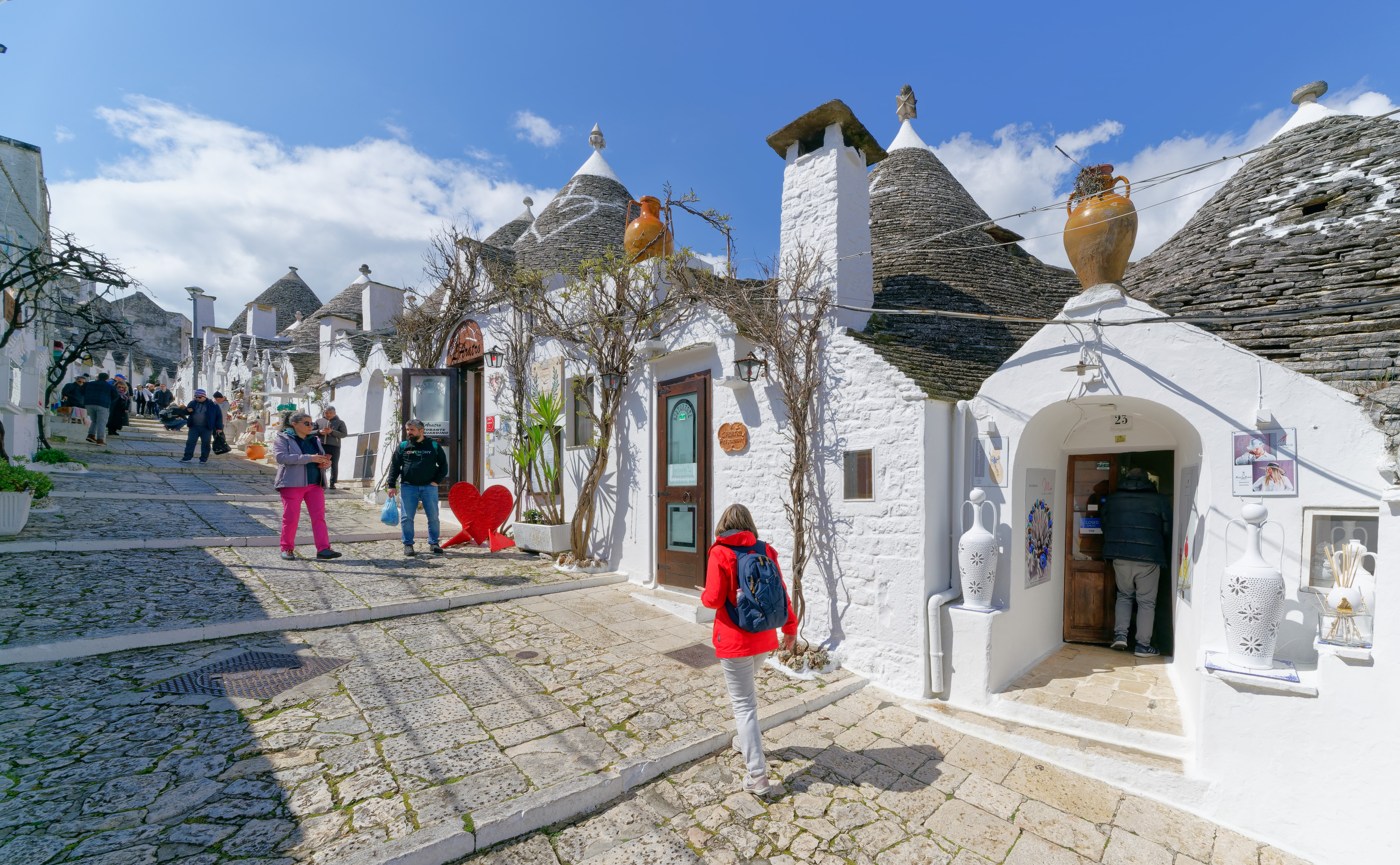
Trulli Street in Alberobello.

Alberobello is twinned with:

- Shirakawa-gō, Japan
- Gokayama, Japan
- Monte Sant'Angelo, Italy, since 2013
- Andria, Italy
- Harran, Turkey, since 2013

During the Italian diaspora, a large number of Alberobellesi emigrated to Utica, New York.

== Transport ==
Alberobello is served by Alberobello railway station. Alberobello is served by the following nearby airports:

- Bari Airport
- Brindisi Airport

Alberobello is also served by Cotrap and FS Sud Est buses.

== Gallery ==
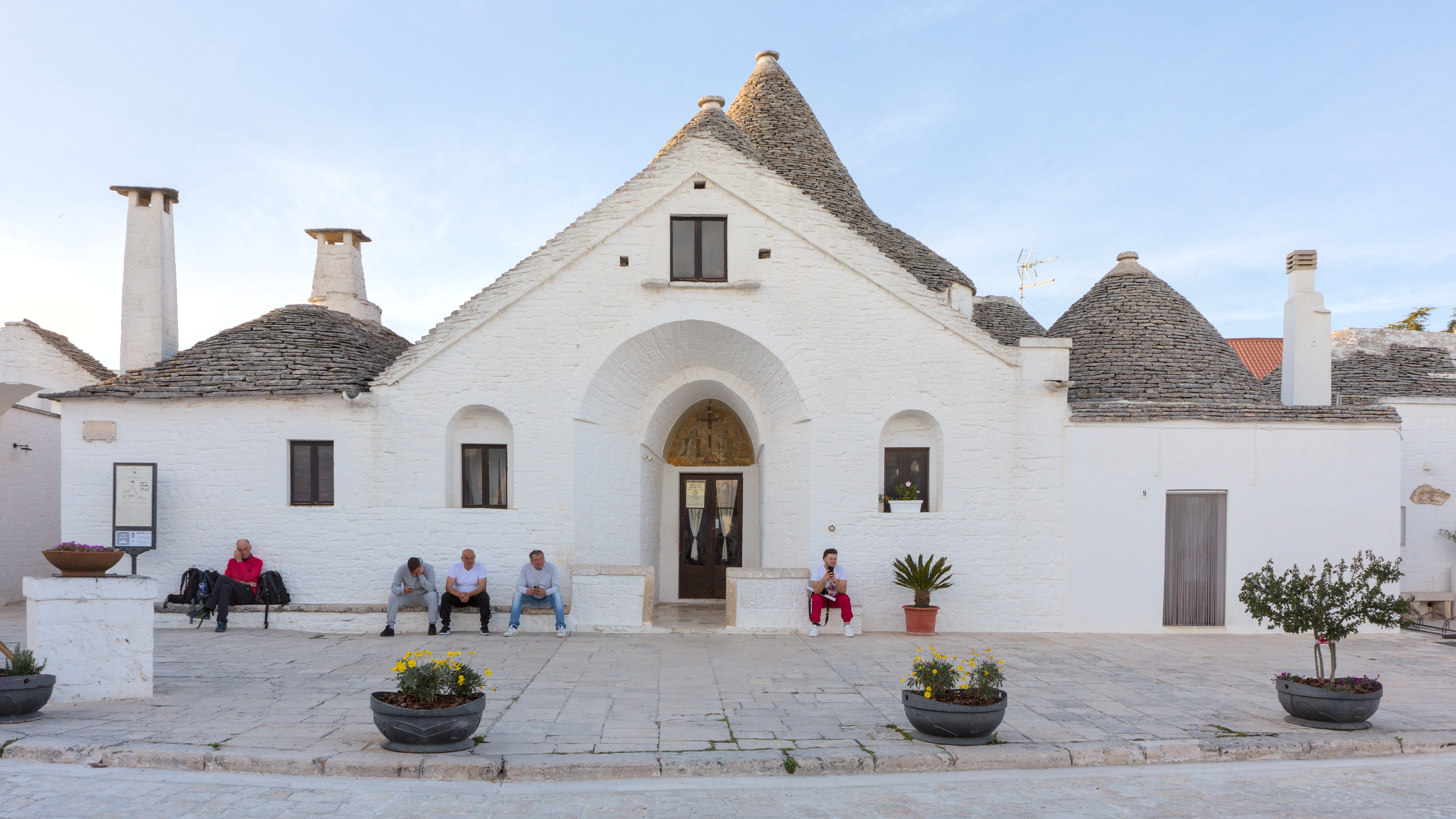
The Trullo Sovrano

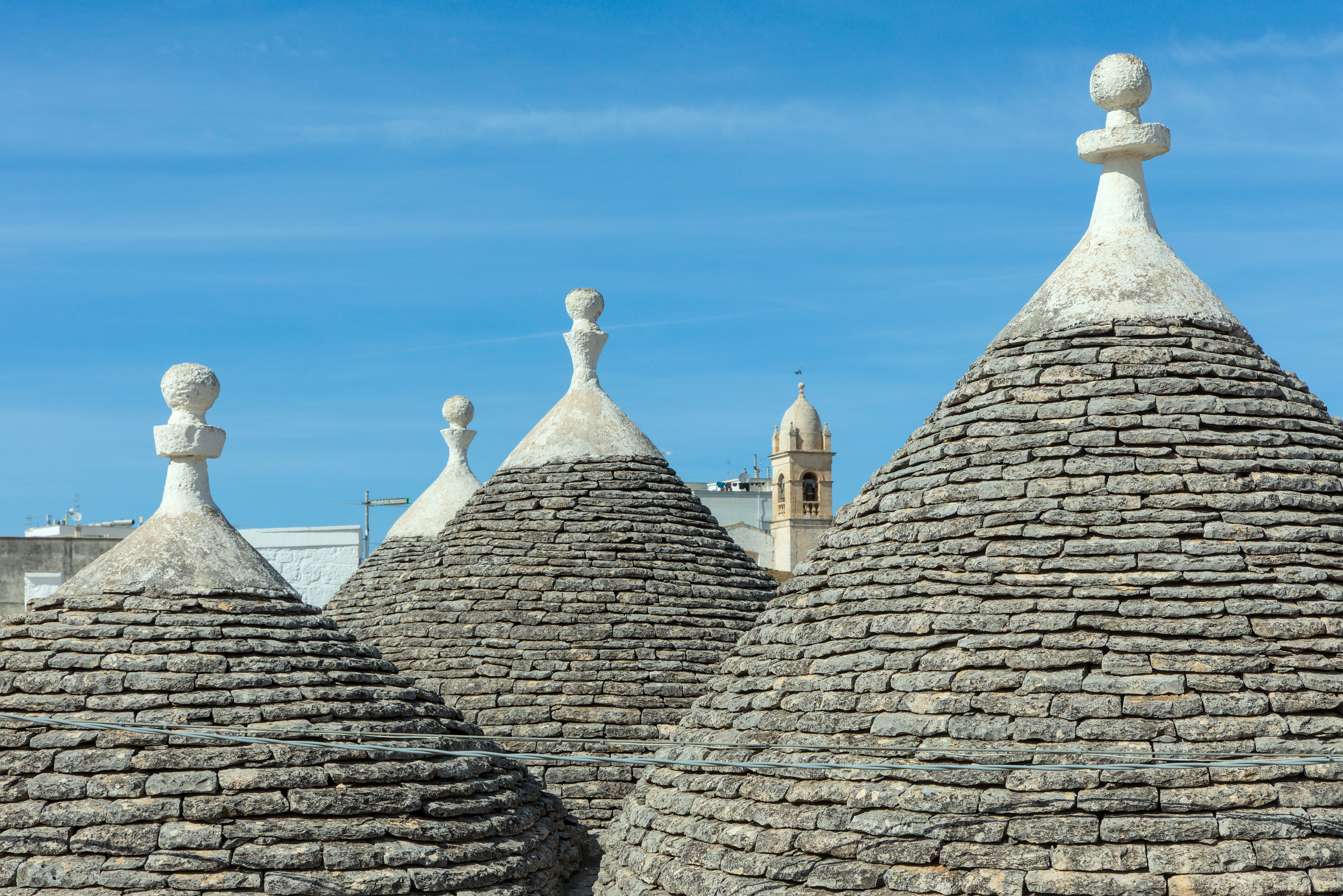
Trulli roofs in Rione Monti

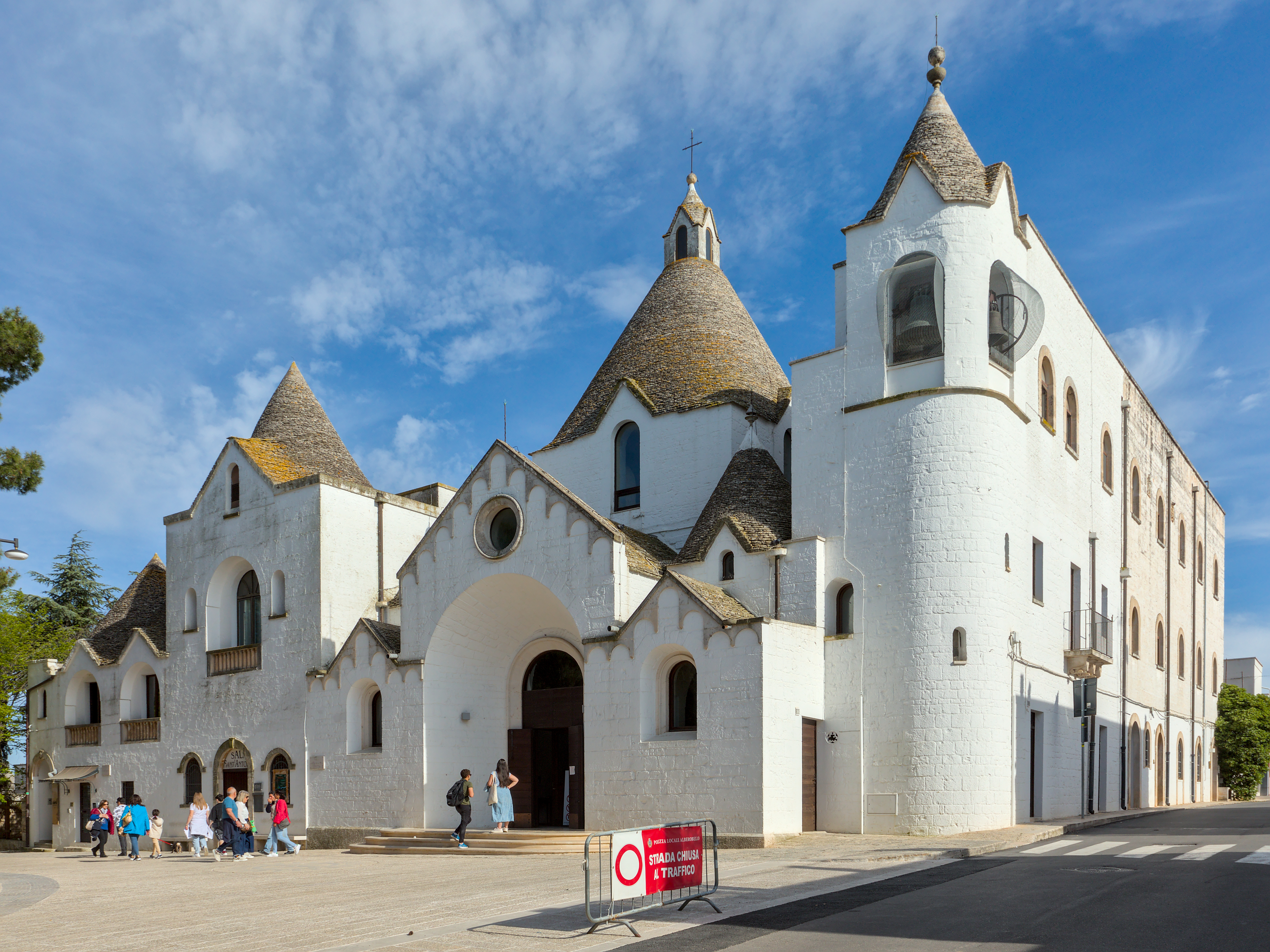
Sant'Antonio di Padova church

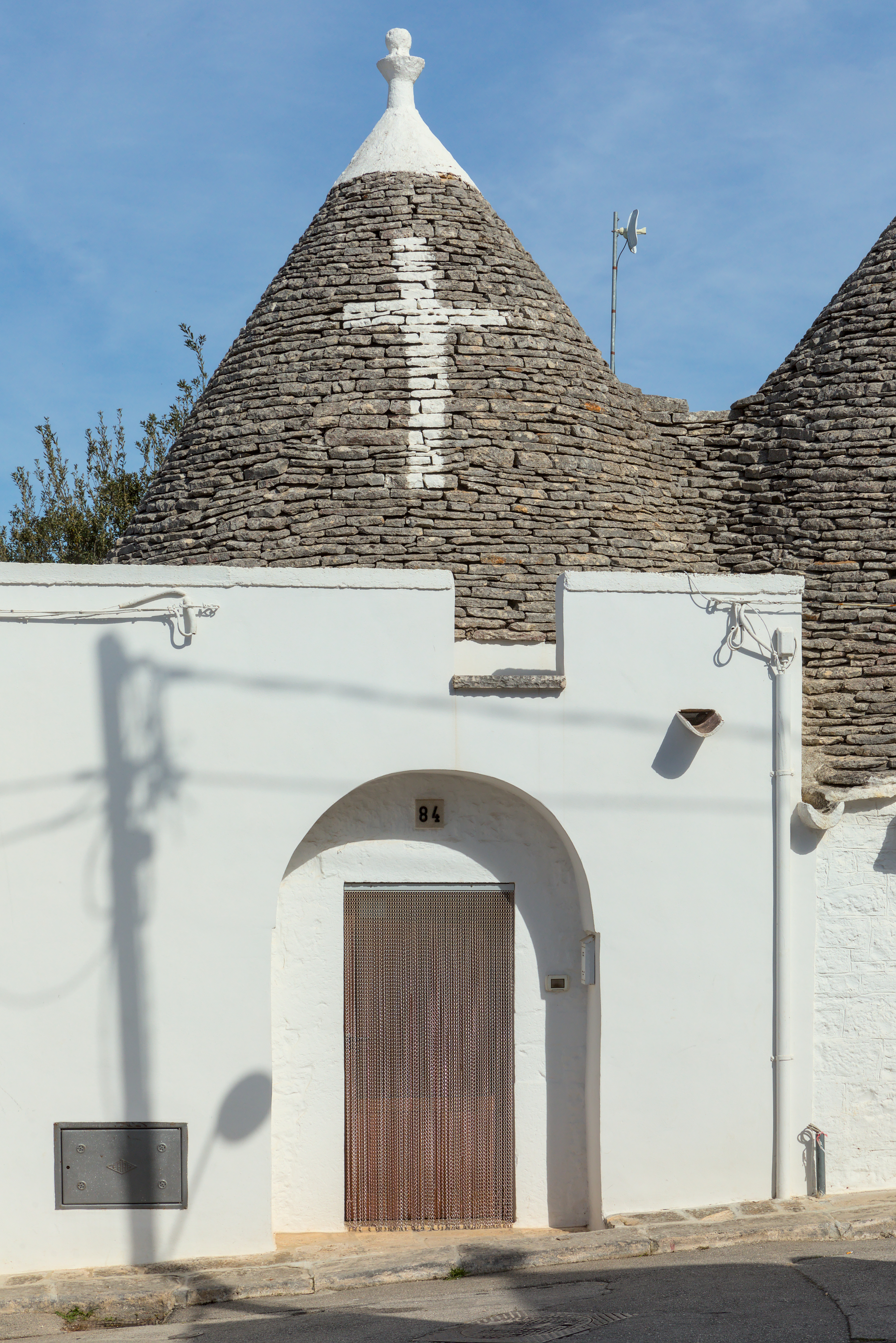
Trullo with a cross painted on the roof
