= Trullo =

Traditional Apulian dry stone hut

Coordinates: 40°46′55.45″N 17°14′13.01″E

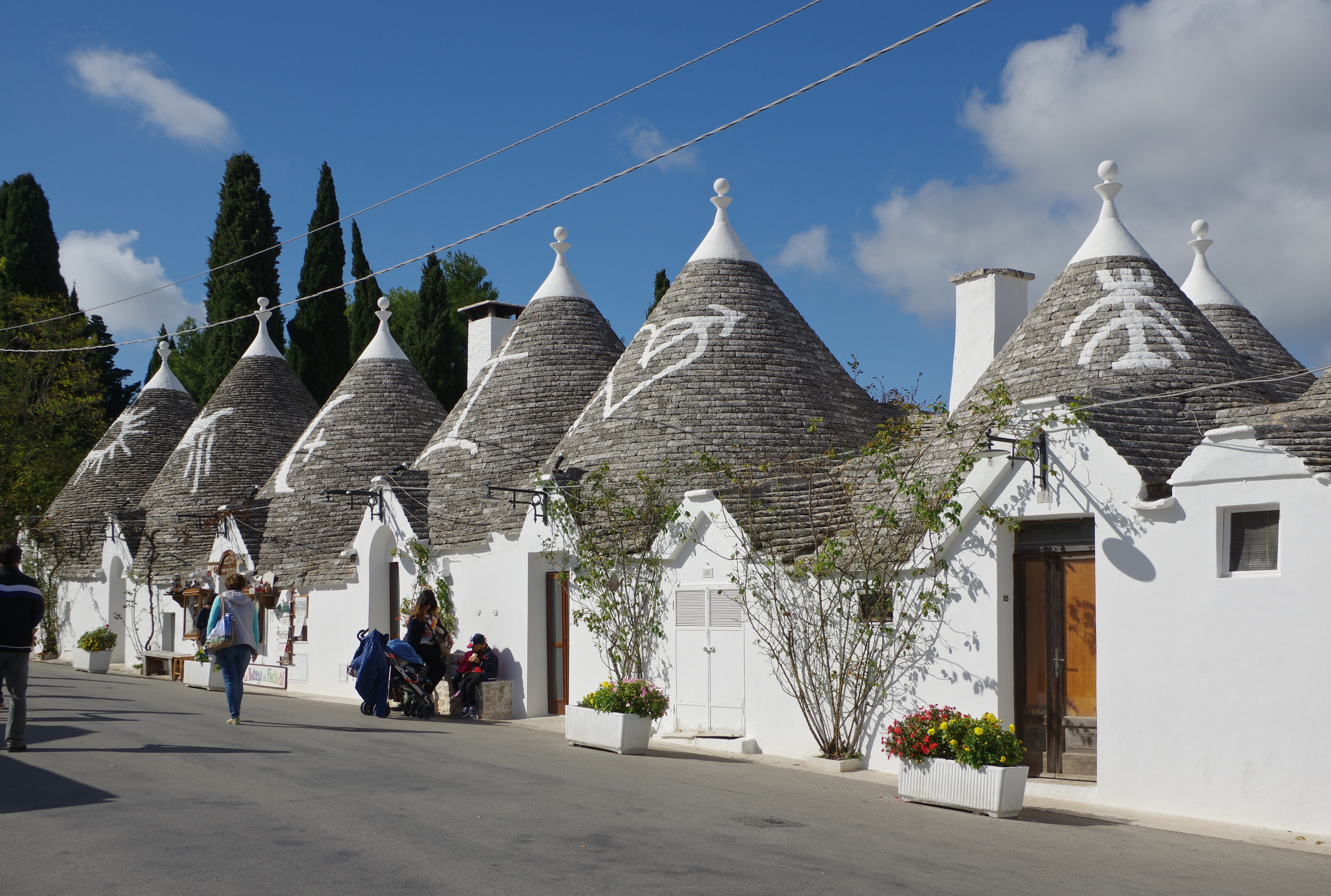
Row of trullo houses on Monte Pertica street in Alberobello, Metropolitan City of Bari, Apulia, southern Italy

A trullo (plural, trulli) is a traditional Apulian dry stone hut with a conical roof. Their style of construction is specific to the Itria Valley, in the Murge area of the Italian region of Apulia. Trulli were generally constructed as temporary field shelters and storehouses or as permanent dwellings by small proprietors or agricultural labourers. In the town of Alberobello, in the province of Bari, whole districts contain dense concentrations of trulli. The golden age of trulli was the nineteenth century, especially its final decades, which were marked by the development of wine growing.

== From the casedda to the trullo ==
The Italian term trullo (from the Greek word τρούλος, cupola) refers to a house whose internal space is covered by a dry stone corbelled or keystone vault. Trullo is an Italianized form of the dialectal term, truddu, used in a specific area of the Salentine peninsula (i.e. Lizzaio, Maruggio, and Avetrana, in other words, outside the Murgia dei Trulli proper), where it is the name of the local agricultural dry stone hut. Trullo has replaced the local term casedda (pl. casedde) (Italian casetta, pl. casette), which was used by locals in the Murgia to call this type of house.

A stonemason specializing in the building of trulli is a trullisto or trullaro in Italian. The corresponding dialectal term is caseddaro (caseddari in the plural), i.e. builder of casedde.

== History ==
There are many theories behind the origin of the design. One of the more popular theories is that due to high taxation on property, the people of Apulia built dry stone wall constructions so that they could be dismantled quickly when tax inspectors were in the area.

In available historical records from the mid-fourteenth century to the late sixteenth century, the area of Alberobello is referred to mostly as selva ("forest") and occasionally, as a land from which grazing animals were excluded. Evidence is lacking as to the existence of dwellings in the area prior to the seventeenth century.

A Plan of the Territory of Mottala drawn by Donato Gallerano in 1704 reveals the existence of a nucleus of trulli in the midst of a large wood, making up the initial settlement of Arbore bello ("beautiful tree").

In a geographical map drawn by Giovanni Antonio Rizzi Zannoni in 1808, one may see the selva of Alberobello and, in the midst of it, a clearing with a settlement pattern of scattered houses that bears a striking resemblance to the present-day urban pattern.

In an 1897 photograph of the rione Monti (the district of the Mounts), the trulli are far less densely packed than today, being surrounded by enclosed gardens.

The urban trulli still extant in Alberobello date from the eighteenth, nineteenth and twentieth centuries. After having undergone a process of densification in the first decades of the twentieth century, the trulli settlements began to be deserted during the second half of the twentieth century.

The rural trulli, on cheaper land, ceased to be built when the cost of labour began to rise in the twentieth century. The sheer expense of handling the hundreds of tons necessary for a single house became prohibitive.

== Distribution ==
The style of construction is specific to the Itria Valley, in the Murge area of the Italian region of Apulia. Trulli may be found in and out of Alberobello, and in the areas around Locorotondo, Fasano, Ostuni, Cisternino, Martina Franca, and Ceglie Messapica.

== Geology ==
The Murgia is a karst plateau. Winter rains drain through the soil into fissures in the strata of limestone bedrock and flow through underground watercourses into the Adriatic. There is no permanent surface water, and water for living purposes must be trapped in catchment basins and cisterns. The surface forms a landscape of rolling hills and ridges punctuated now and again with dolines and other forms of enclosed depressions characteristic of karsts.

== Architecture ==
=== Grouping ===
The trullo is essentially a rural building type. With its thick walls and its inability to form multi-storey structures, it is an inefficient use of ground space and consequently ill-suited for high density settlement. Being constructed of small stones, however, it has a flexibility and adaptability of form making the design most helpful in tight urban situations.

In the countryside, trullo domes were built singly or in groups of up to five, or sometimes, in large farmyard clusters of a dozen or two dozen, but never for the occupancy of more than a single rural family.

=== Materials ===
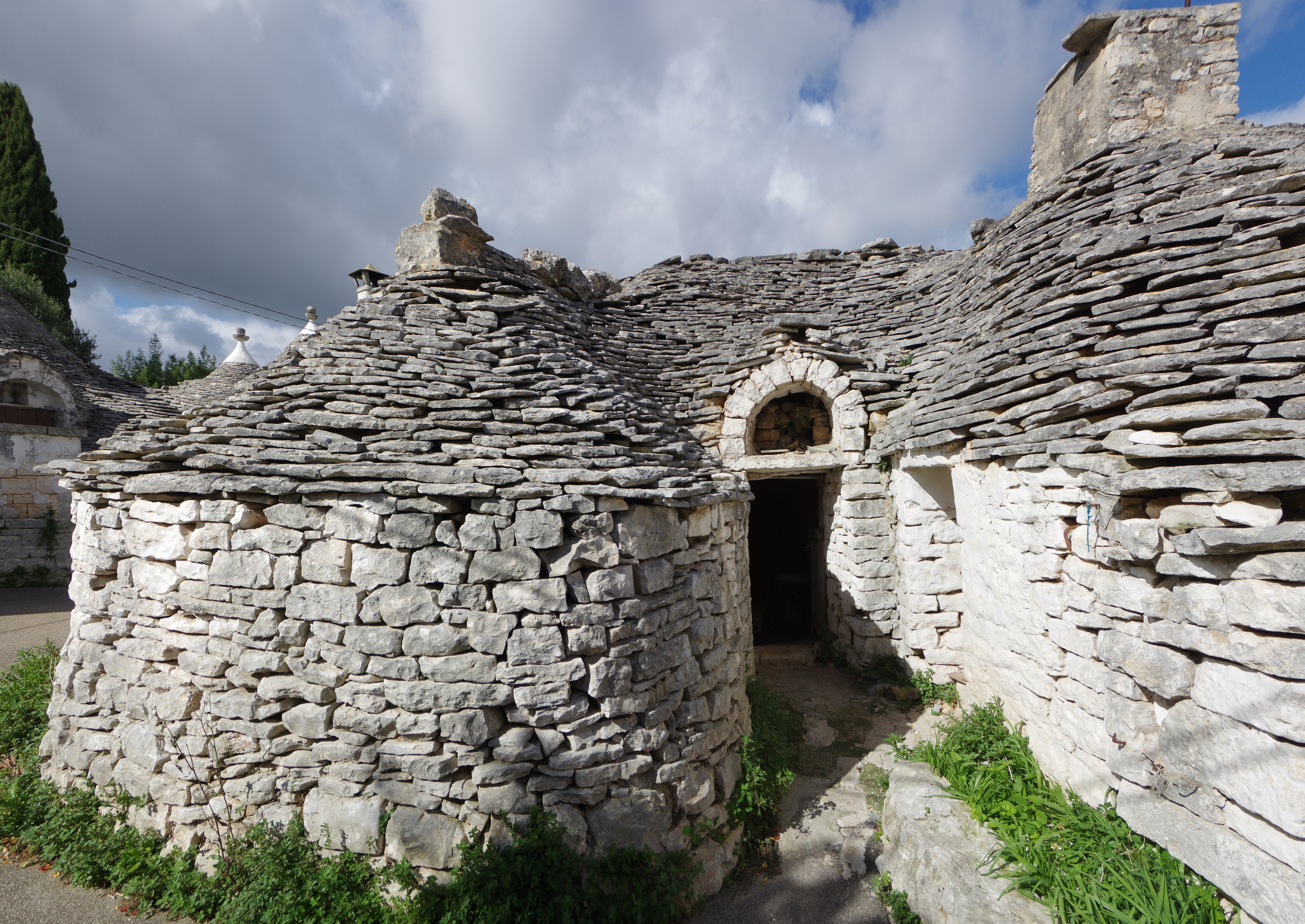
Recessed entrance to a trullo complex.

Depending on the area, the building material used could be either hard limestone or calcareous tufa.

=== Masonry ===
Traditionally trulli were built using dry stone masonry, i.e. without any mortar or cement. This style of construction also is prevalent in the surrounding countryside where most of the fields are separated by dry-stone walls.

=== Walls ===
In Alberobello, the structural walls of a trullo are laid directly on the bedrock, after removal of the topsoil when necessary. Their width varies from 0.80 metres to 2.70 metres (a measure recorded in the Trullo Sovrano). Their height (from ground level to where the vault starts) ranges from 1.60 metres to 2 metres. Their exterior facing has a 3 to 5% batter.

=== Underground cistern ===
The stones needed for starting to build a trullo were provided by digging a cistern (cisterna), an absolute necessity in an area devoid of water. The cistern was capped with a lime-mortared barrel vault or dome that in many cases, supported the floor of the house.

=== Roofs ===
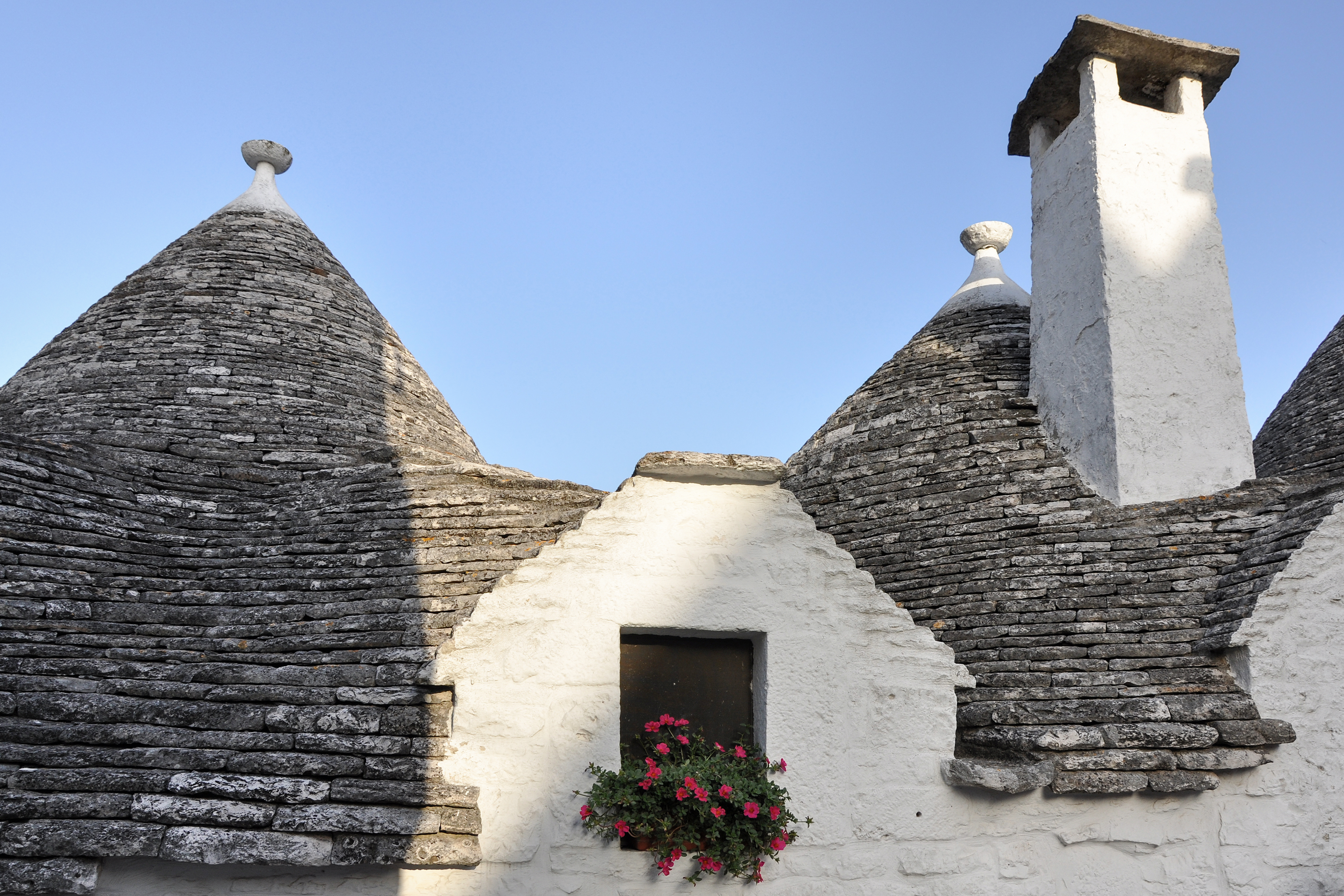
Renovated stone roofs.

The roofs are constructed in two skins: an inner skin of limestone voussoirs, capped by a closing stone, and an outer skin of limestone slabs that are slightly tilted outwardly, ensuring that the structure is watertight. The roof stones may be taken away without compromising the stability of the rest of the building.

=== Plans ===
The trullo may take on a circular or a square plan. The circular trullo is mostly a temporary shelter for animals and their fodder, or, for the peasant himself.

The trullo that is part of a grouping of three, four, or five follows a squarish plan. It may serve as a kitchen, bedroom, animal shelter, store room for food or tools, oven, or cistern, as the case may be.

In Alberobello, groupings did not exceed two trulli, as evidenced by nineteenth-century notarial deeds.

=== Pinnacles ===
In Alberobello, atop the cone of a trullo, there is normally a hand-worked sandstone pinnacle (pinnacolo), that may be one of many designs: disk, ball, cone, bowl, polyhedron, or a combination thereof, that is supposed to be the signature of the stonemason who built the trullo.

=== Whitewashed symbols ===
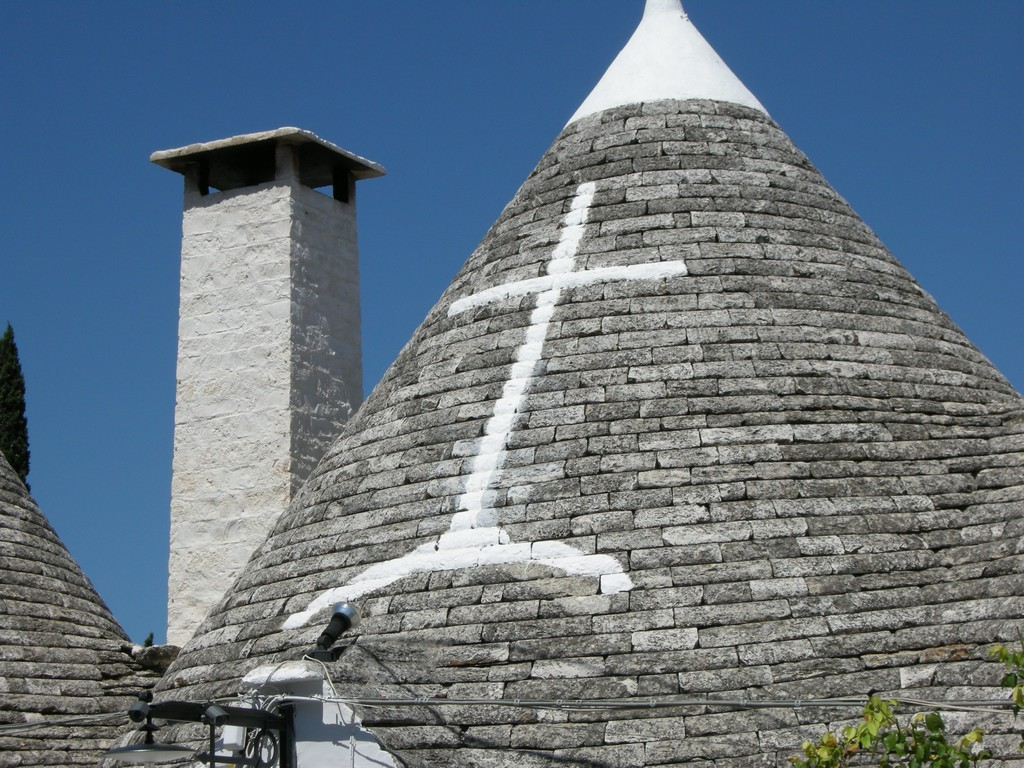
A whitewashed Christian cross on a renovated stone roof.

Additionally, the cone may have a symbol painted on it (as shown in the picture of the trulli in Alberobello.) Such symbols may include Christian symbols such as a simple cross, a cross on a heart pierced by an arrow (representing Santa Maria Addolorata ("Our Lady of Sorrows"), a circle divided into four quarters with the letters S, C, S, D in them (for Sanctus Christus and Sanctus Dominus according to one source, but more likely, the initials of Santo Cosma and Santo Damiano, the two saints to whom the local basilica is dedicated) and quite a few others.

The symbols now visible on a row of trulli in via Monte Pertica (cross, pierced heart, host with rays radiating from it, tree, dove symbolising the Holy Spirit, and crescent with a cross) were painted only in the late twentieth century and the early 2000s when the roof cones were renovated.

The quaint symbols that grace the trullo-like cones of bungalows at the Hotel dei Trulli in Alberobello first appeared in the late 1950s, when the hotel resort was built.

=== Interiors ===
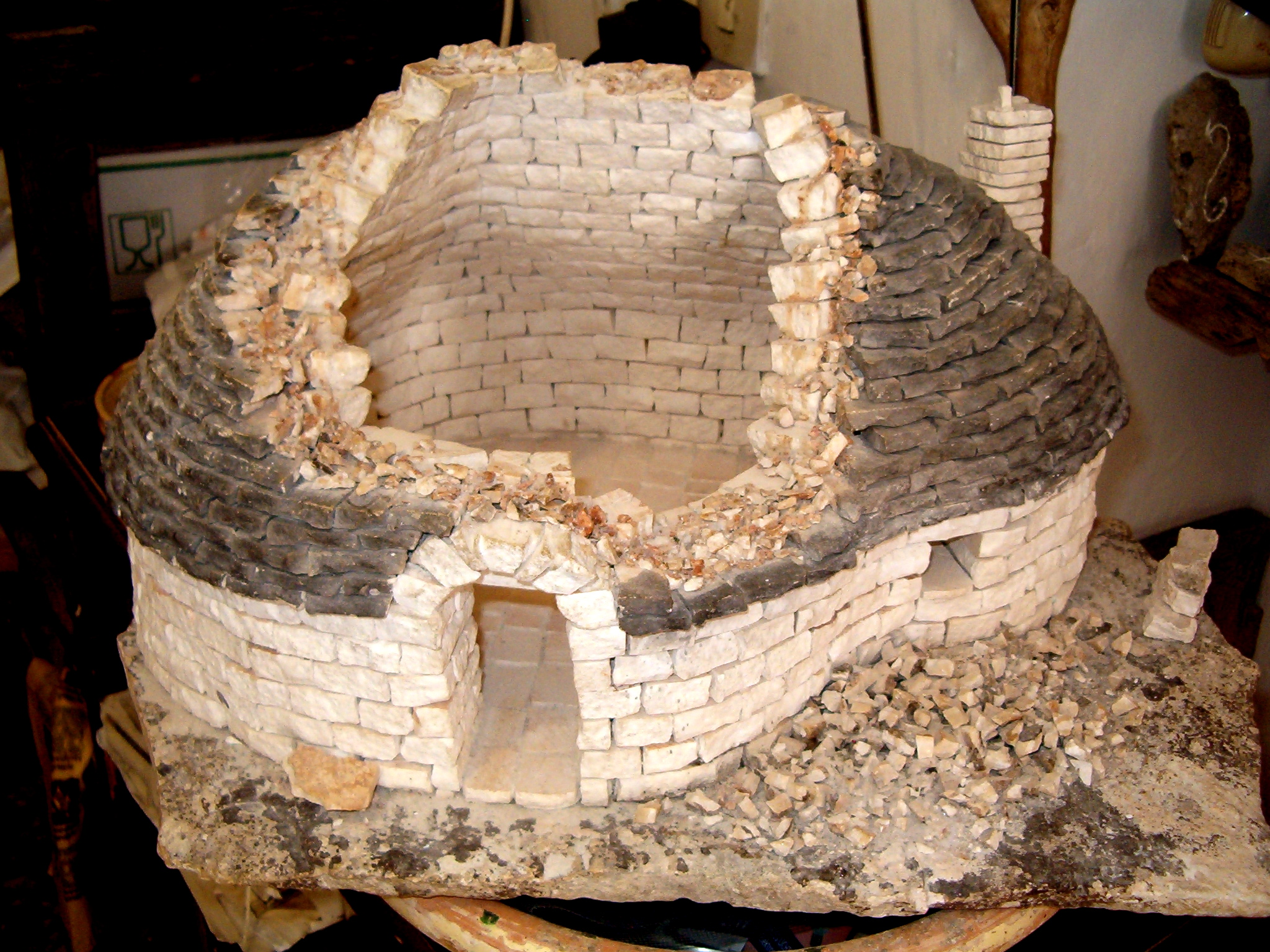
Model showing the typical construction technique of a trullo of Alberobello; the cavity between the inside ashlar wall face and the exterior covering of stone tiles or chiancharelle is filled with stone rubble and the vault is one of stone voussoirs.

The vast majority of trulli have one room under each conical roof, with additional living spaces in arched alcoves. Children would sleep in alcoves made in the wall with curtains hung to separate them from the central room.

A multi-room trullo house has many cones, each representing a separate room.

Along with its exterior wall, a trullo's interior room and vault intrados often were rendered with lime plaster and whitewashed for protection against drafts.

The trulli used as dwellings all have an open fireplace complete with a flue (hidden in the masonry) and a stone-built chimney stack (rising high above the roof). Because of their design, trulli are difficult to heat: the walls are very thick and warm air will rise up the interior cone. An alternative heating solution was to use a central brasero with embers in it (a specimen may be seen in Alberobello's Museo del Territorio).

The thick stone walls and dome of the trullo that cool pleasantly during the summer, tend to become unpleasantly cold during the winter months, condensing the moisture given off by cooking and breathing, making it difficult to feel warm even in front of the fire. The inhabitants simply leave the doors open during the day to keep the interior dry, and live more outdoors than in.

In trulli that were used as stables, the troughs the animals fed from may still be seen.

=== Windows ===
Owing to the concentration of houses, trulli have few openings except for their doorway and a small aperture provided in the roof cone for ventilation, this coupled with the extremely high thermal inertia makes them warmer in winter and cooler in the summer. On the other hand, trulli can be quite dark inside.

=== Façades ===
Some trullo houses have had their perimeter walls raised substantially so that their cones may be hidden from view, making the buildings resemble ordinary houses.

A number of conical roofs have a truncated top with a round hole in it covered by a movable circular slab. Access to the hole is by an outside stairway built into the roof. These trulli were for storage of grain, hay, or straw.

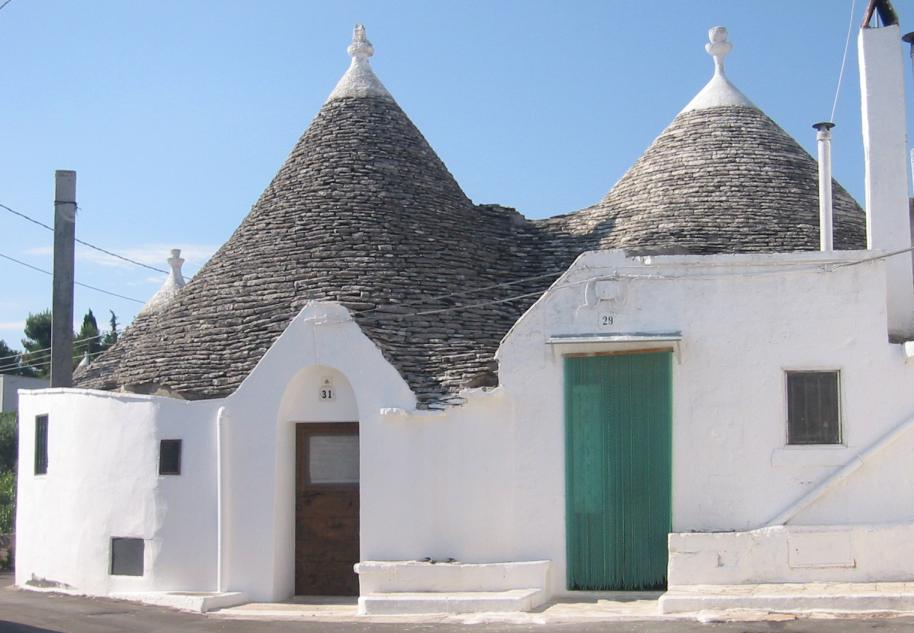
Two contiguous trulli (Alberobello)

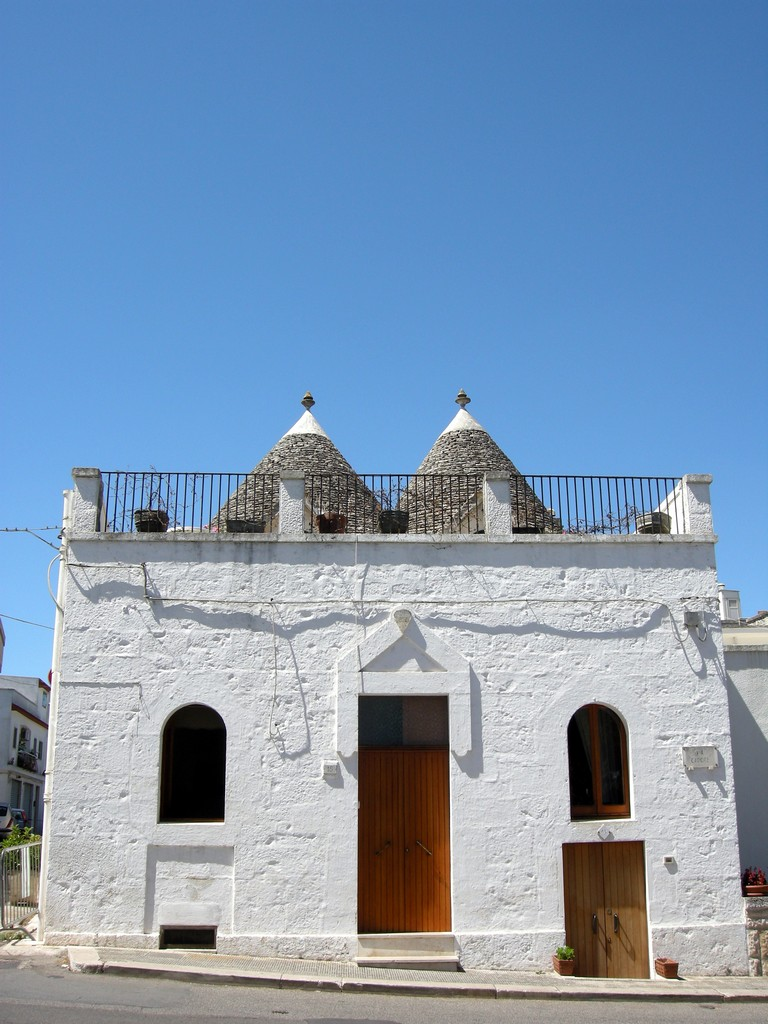
Trullo house with raised façade wall hiding both its conical roofs (Alberobello)

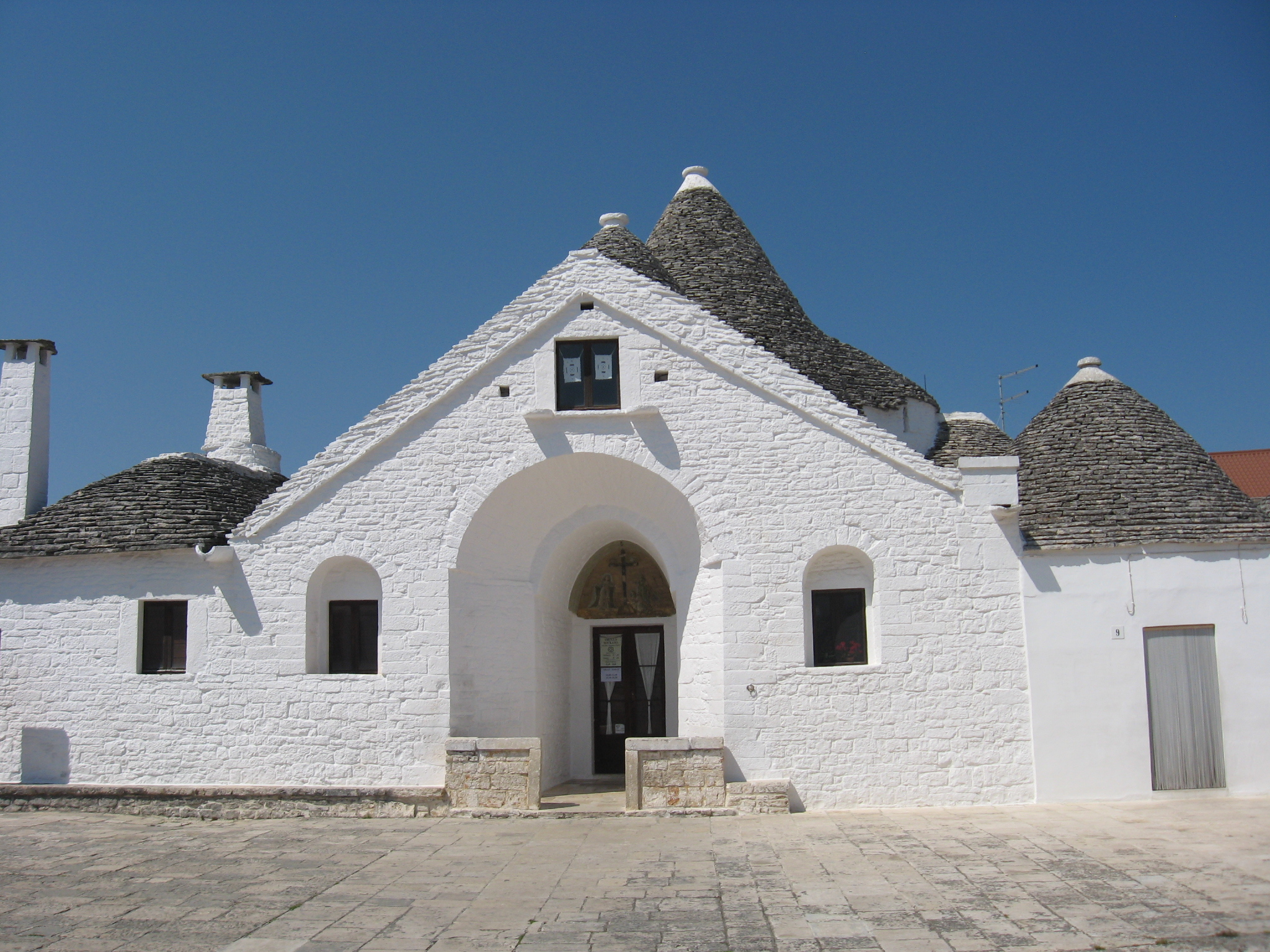
Trullo Sovrano, built on two levels with internal staircase

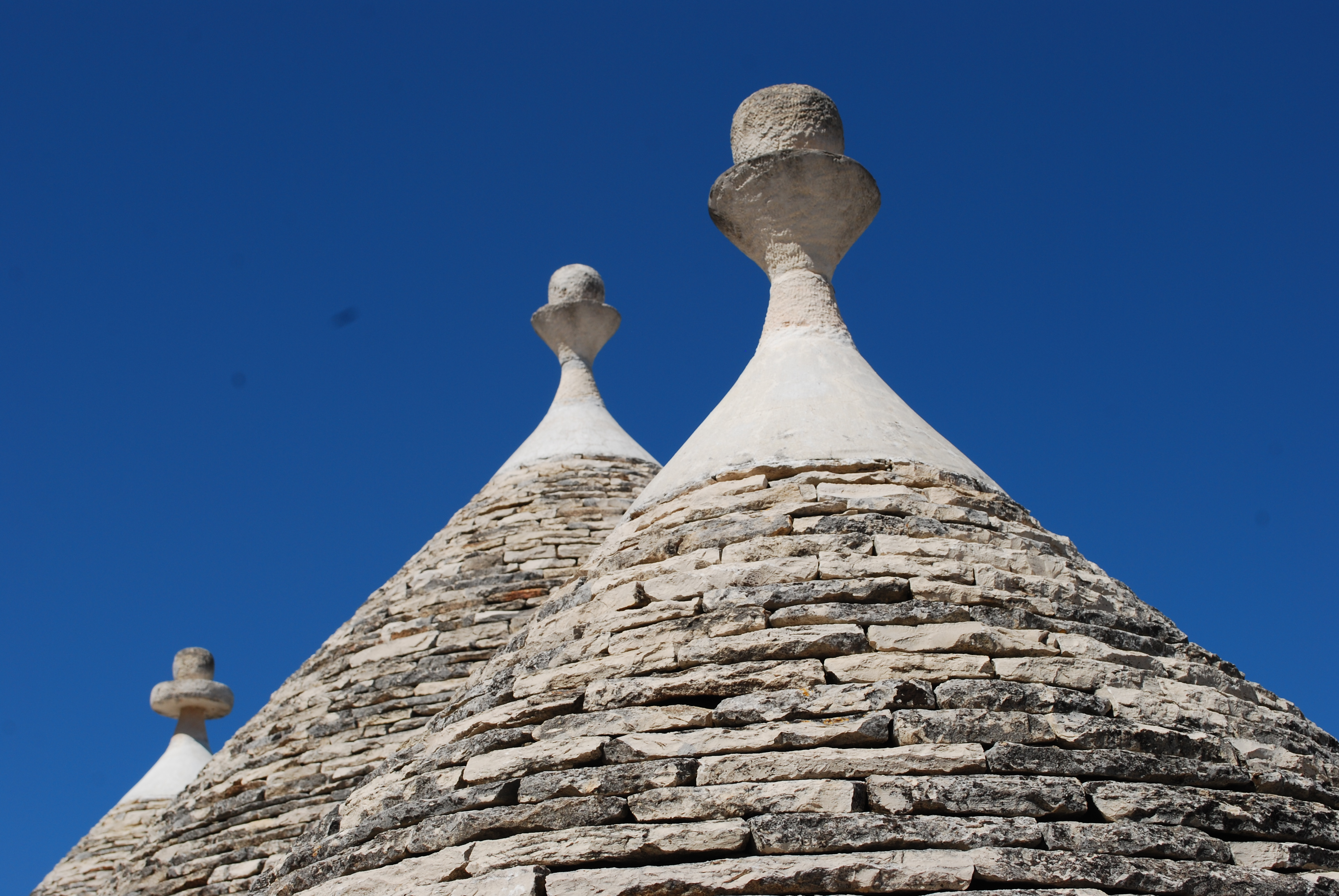
Carved stone pinnacles atop refurbished trullo cones (Alberobello)

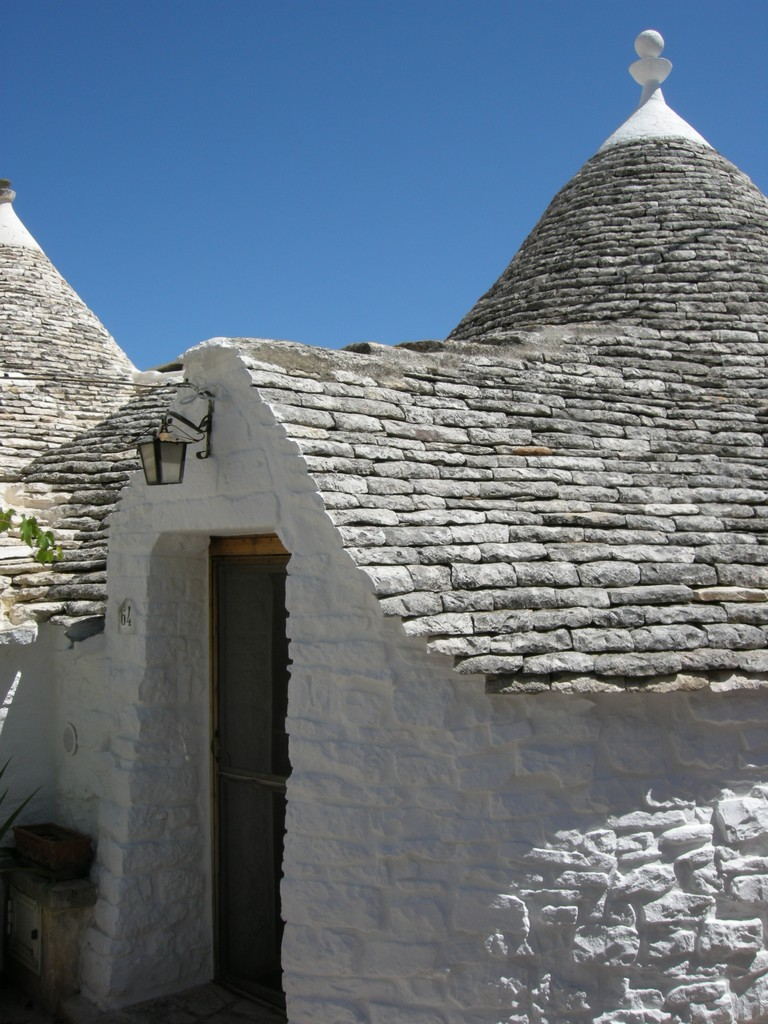
Entrance of a trullo (Alberobello)

== Trulli as a tourist attraction ==
Today, the surviving trulli are popular with British and German tourists and are often bought and restored for general use. Anyone wishing to restore a trullo, however, needs to conform with many regulations, as trulli are protected under the United Nations Educational, Scientific, and Cultural Organization (UNESCO) world heritage law.

Since the beginning of the twenty-first century, a large number of trullo houses have been restored and converted into second homes or self-catering cottages. In 1999, rebuilding a trullo roof would cost about three million lira (about 1,500 euros) and in 2009, the cost rose up to 15,000 euros.

In late twentieth century the Monti district in Alberobello was largely a derelict area when Antonella Guido and Dino Barnaba began buying up a few dozen abandoned trulli, installed modern kitchenettes in them with a view to renting them out as mini apartments for the night for less than rooms cost at local hotels. They even painted good-luck symbols on the roof of each trullo.

In Apulia region some Trulli are still inhabited, most of them have been made compliant with hygienic norms; the ones closer to cities have often been converted into rooms for an adjacent home or villa built with modern techniques; this trend has slowed because most of these modifications are considered illegal due to the damage to the historical structure.

In the Alberobello region, local residents who still live in trulli do so only because they cannot afford to move out or, because they provide bed and board for tourists in their trulli.

== See also ==
- Crotto, a similar construction in northern Italy
- Dry stone masonry
- Beehive house
- Early and simple domes
