= Una Chi =

Italian translator and writer (1942–2021)

- Born: Bruna Bianchi; 5 June 1942; Milan
- Died: 19 January 2021 (aged 78); Cisternino
- Known for: Erotic literature, translations from German
- Website: Official website

Una Chi (born Bruna Bianchi; Milan, 5 June 1942 – Cisternino, 19 January 2021) was an Italian translator and writer.

== Life ==
Bruna Bianchi was born in Milan in 1942. For many years she was a professor of German literature at the University of Milan. She translated into Italian several German literature masterpieces, including Günter Grass' From the Diary of a Snail (Aus dem Tagebuch einer Schnecke) (Einaudi, Turin, 1974); Max von der Grün's Stellenweise Glatteis (Einaudi, 1977); Max Frisch's Montauk (Einaudi, 1977) and Bluebeard (Einaudi, 1984); Hermann Hesse's Liebesgeschichten (Mondadori, 2016); Annette von Droste-Hülshoff's Letzte Gaben (Campanotto, 1990); and Martin Walser's Das Einhorn (Feltrinelli, 1969). She also translated works by Goethe and Thomas Mann.

In 1994 she published her first novel, È duro campo di battaglia il letto. under the pseudonym Una Chi (Italian for "One Who"). She then authored three more erotica books, mostly conspicuous for her scholarly and coldly analytical prose and the crudeness of her narrative.

In 1999 she translated a revised Italian edition of Grass's The Tin Drum for Einaudi.

== Works ==
- 1994: E duro campo di battaglia il letto, ES, 1994 ISBN 88-86534-56-6;
- 1995: Il sesso degli angeli, ES, 1995 ISBN 88-86534-09-4;
- 1997: Ti vedo meglio al buio, ES, 1998 ISBN 88-86534-53-1;
- 2000: L'ultimo desiderio, ES, 2000 ISBN 88-87939-00-4
