= Rotaria (diocese) =

Ancient Roman and Byzantine era bishopric

Rotaria (adjective Rotariensis) was an ancient Roman and Byzantine era bishopric of Numidia, North Africa.

The civitas turned predominantly Donatist (a schismatic heresy) in Churchmanship. and appears to have been ethnically Roman rather than Berber. It is a titular see and the title is now held by Ivan Šaško, auxiliary bishop of Zagreb.

Rotaria has been identified with Henchir-Loulou, near Renier Algeria, but was located in the Roman province of Numidia.

Nearby Azura, Numidia, also was a civitas and bishopric, and similarly now a Latin Catholic titular see.

== Bishops ==
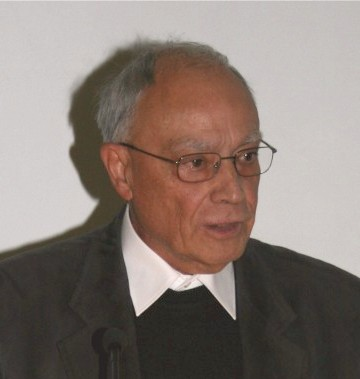
Reinhard Lettmann.jpg

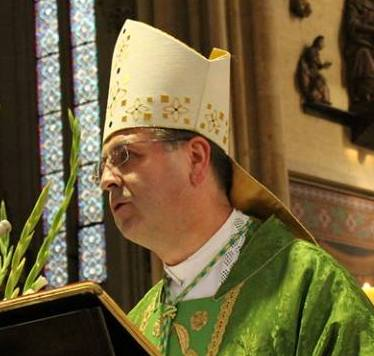
Ivan Šaško.

- Felix (Donatist Bishop).
- Simplicus (411) (Donatist)
- Victor(411) took part in the Council of Carthage (411).
- Pavol Brezanóczy (15 September 1964 – 10 January 1969)
- Percival Caza (18 March 1969 – 26 November 1970)
- Vincent Madeley Harris (27 April 1971 – 15 November 1971)
- Reinhard Lettmann (18 January 1973 – 11 January 1980)
- Martino Scarafile (20 December 1980 – 31 October 1985)
- Agustín Otero Largacha (3 May 1986 – 9 May 2004)
- Gonzalo de Villa y Vásquez (9 July 2004 – 28 July 2007)
- Ivan Šaško (11 February 2008 – present)

== See also ==
- List of Catholic dioceses in Algeria
