= Henchir-Loulou =

Locality and archaeology site in Algeria

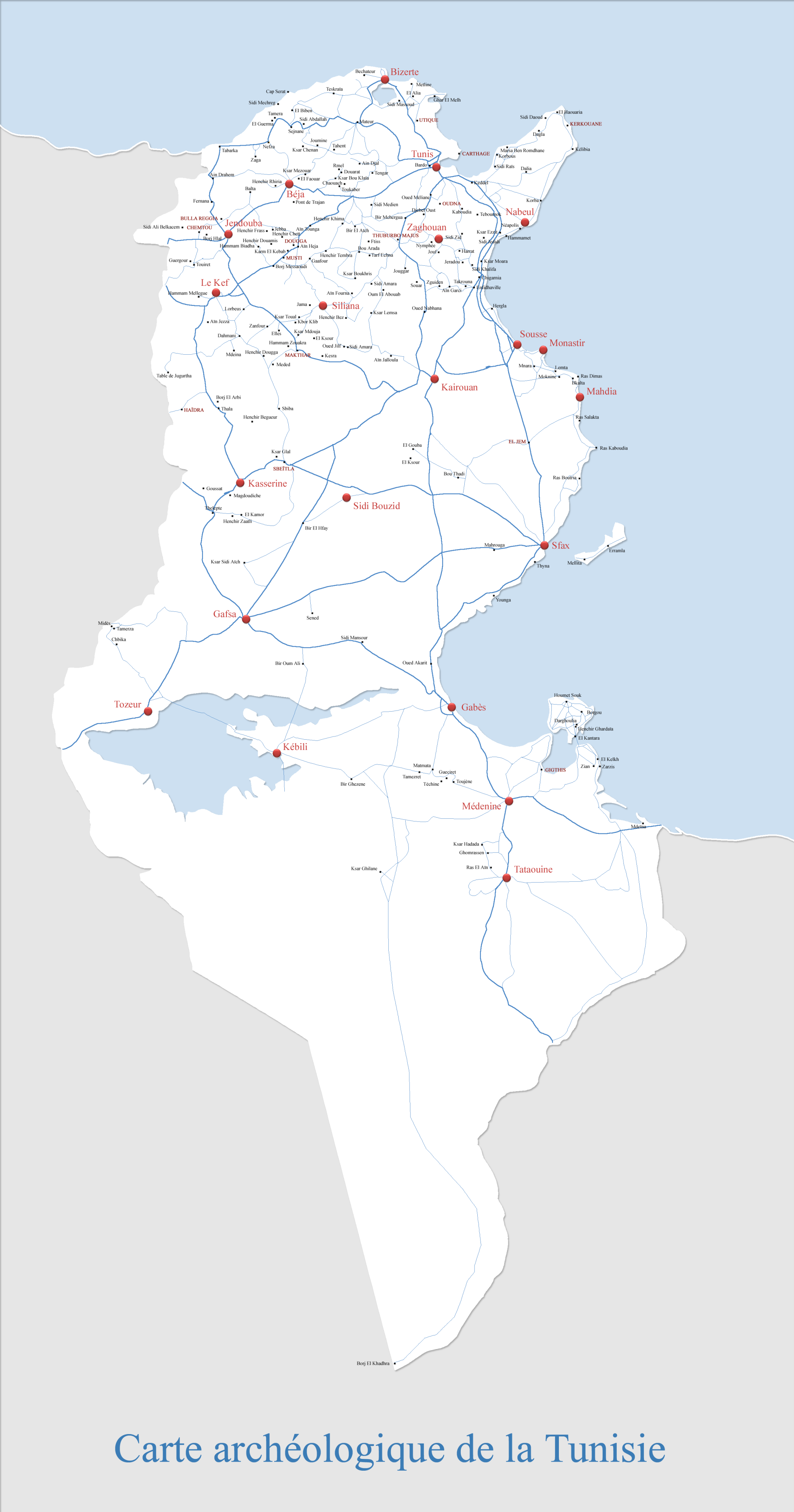
Archaeology map of Tunisia

Henchir-Loulou a locality and archaeology site near the modern town of Aïn Makhlouf, Algeria. It is the site of an ancient Roman Era town.

Known throughout antiquity as Rotaria, Henchir-Loulou is a site containing vast archeological remains but the site has experienced a significant loss in its archaeological fabric as it has been used as a quarry for cut stone, for nearby villages. this has led to a degradation in the original makeup of the town.

The first comprehensive survey of the Roman town was conducted by Léon Renier during French colonial times.
