= Banovo =

- Village
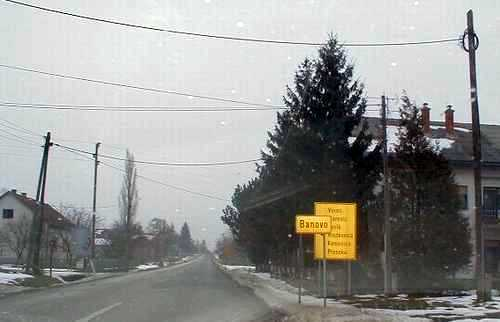

- Location within Croatia
- Coordinates: 45°54′54″N 16°25′55″E
- Country: Croatia
- County: Zagreb County

Area
  - Total: 0.7 km^{2} (0.27 sq mi)

Population (2021)
  - Total: 118
  - Density: 170/km^{2} (440/sq mi)
- Time zone: UTC+1 (CET)
  - Summer (DST): UTC+2 (CEST)

Banovo is a village in Croatia. It is connected by the D41 highway.
