= Itria Valley =

Area of Apulia, Southern Italy

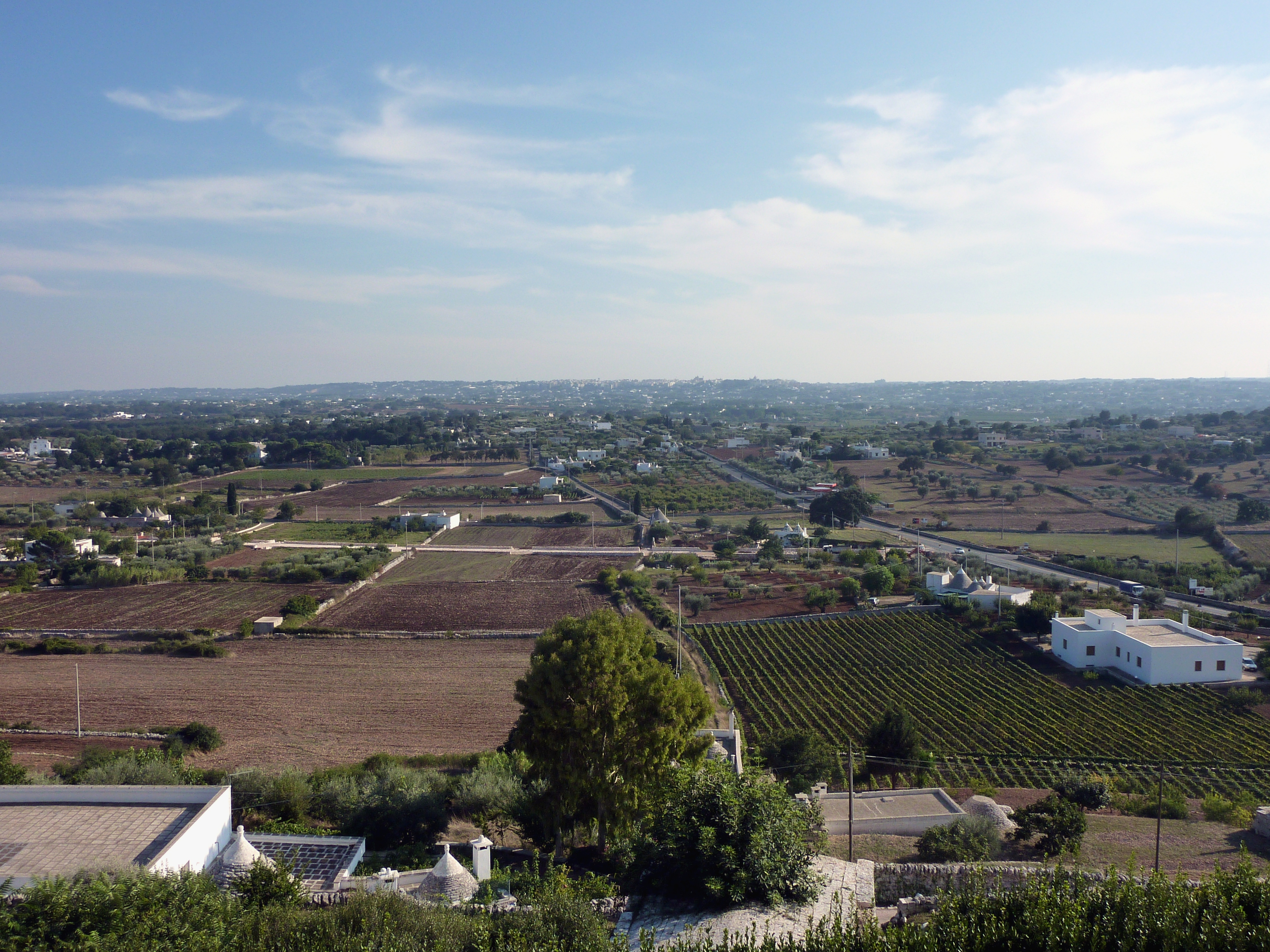
Itria Valley seen from Locorotondo

Itria Valley (in Italian: Valle d'Itria) is an area located in Apulia region, in Southern Italy. Itria Valley spreads over Province of Bari, Province of Brindisi and Province of Taranto, and coincide with the lower part of Murgia upland (Low Murgia). The towns of Martina Franca, Locorotondo, Cisternino and Ceglie Messapica overlook Itria Valley. "Valley" is an inaccurate term, because Itria Valley has not the typical conformation of mountain area valleys: it is just a depression due to karstic phenomena.

== History ==
Itria Valley place-name is probably derived from Basilian Fathers oriental cult of the Madonna Odegitria (that is, ‘the Virgin Mary who shows the way’), patron of wayfarers, which founded - using a natural shelter located in Itria Valley - a monastic site where a fresco portraying the Madonna Odegitria was found. Over the ruins of this medieval place of worship, located in Martina Franca, the Capuchin Monastery (in Italian: Convento dei Cappuccini) - which nowadays is an interesting tourist attraction - was built in 1545.

== Features ==
The main Itria Valley features are the following:

- trulli, the typical ancient Apulian small round houses of stone with a conical roof;
- a large amount of olives from which they obtain olive oil;
- vineyards from which they obtain high quality white wine, such as Locorotondo DOC and Martina Franca DOC.

== Comprehensive list of the town territories comprised in Itria Valley area ==
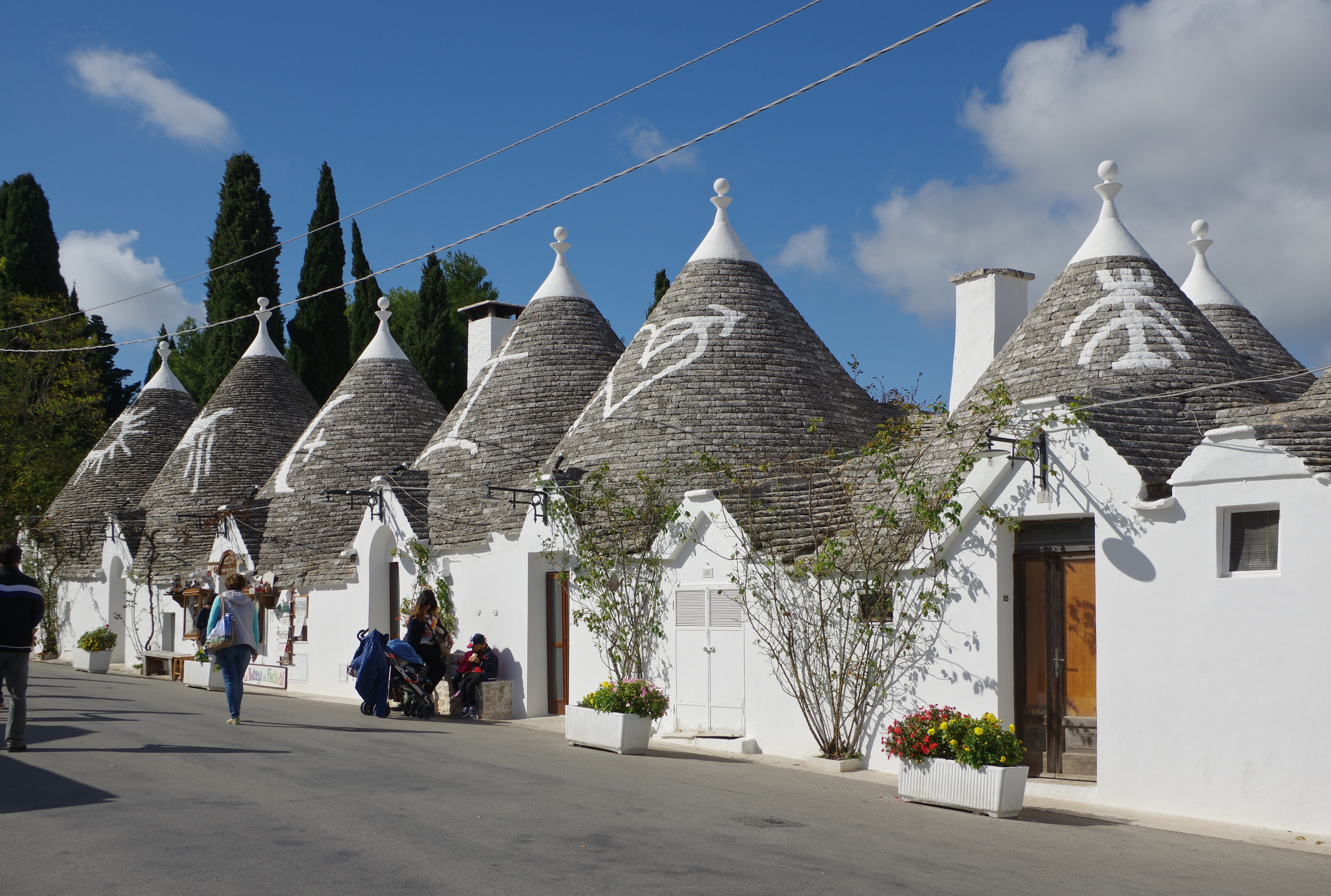
Trulli in Alberobello

- In Province of Bari:
  - Alberobello
  - Locorotondo
- In Province of Brindisi:
  - Ceglie Messapica
  - Cisternino
  - Ostuni
- In Province of Taranto:
  - Martina Franca
