= Crotto (architecture) =

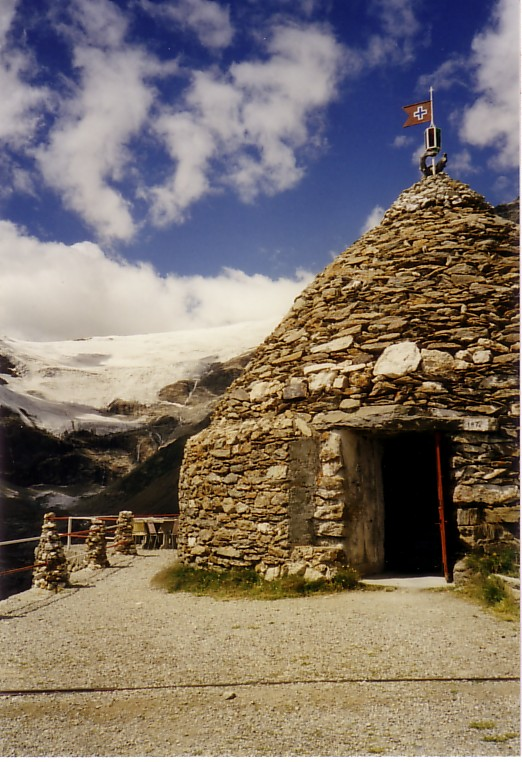
A crotto at Sassal Mason

A crotto (plural: crotti, in Puschlav dialect - singular and plural: crot) is a round, domed, one-roomed house. Crotti represent a special feature of the Swiss Val Poschiavo, but can also be found in the neighboring valleys of the Italian Valchiavenna.

They are built of quarry stone without mortar, a type of construction known as early as the Bronze Age, and are often built over a spring. When used as a milk cellar, there was also water for rinsing the vessels. Inside, a crotto is cool and damp, so they were used to store food, but some were also inhabited.

The Crotto from 1876 (right) stands next to the excursion restaurant "Sassal Mason" at an altitude of 2355 m above sea level and is still used today to store drinks, especially wine.

== See also ==
Trullo, a similar structure in southern Italy

== Bibliography ==
- Peter Meyer: Das große ADAC Alpenbuch. ADAC Verlag GmbH, 81365 München 1995, ISBN 3-87003-689-3.
