= Cisternino =

- Comune
- Comune di Cisternino
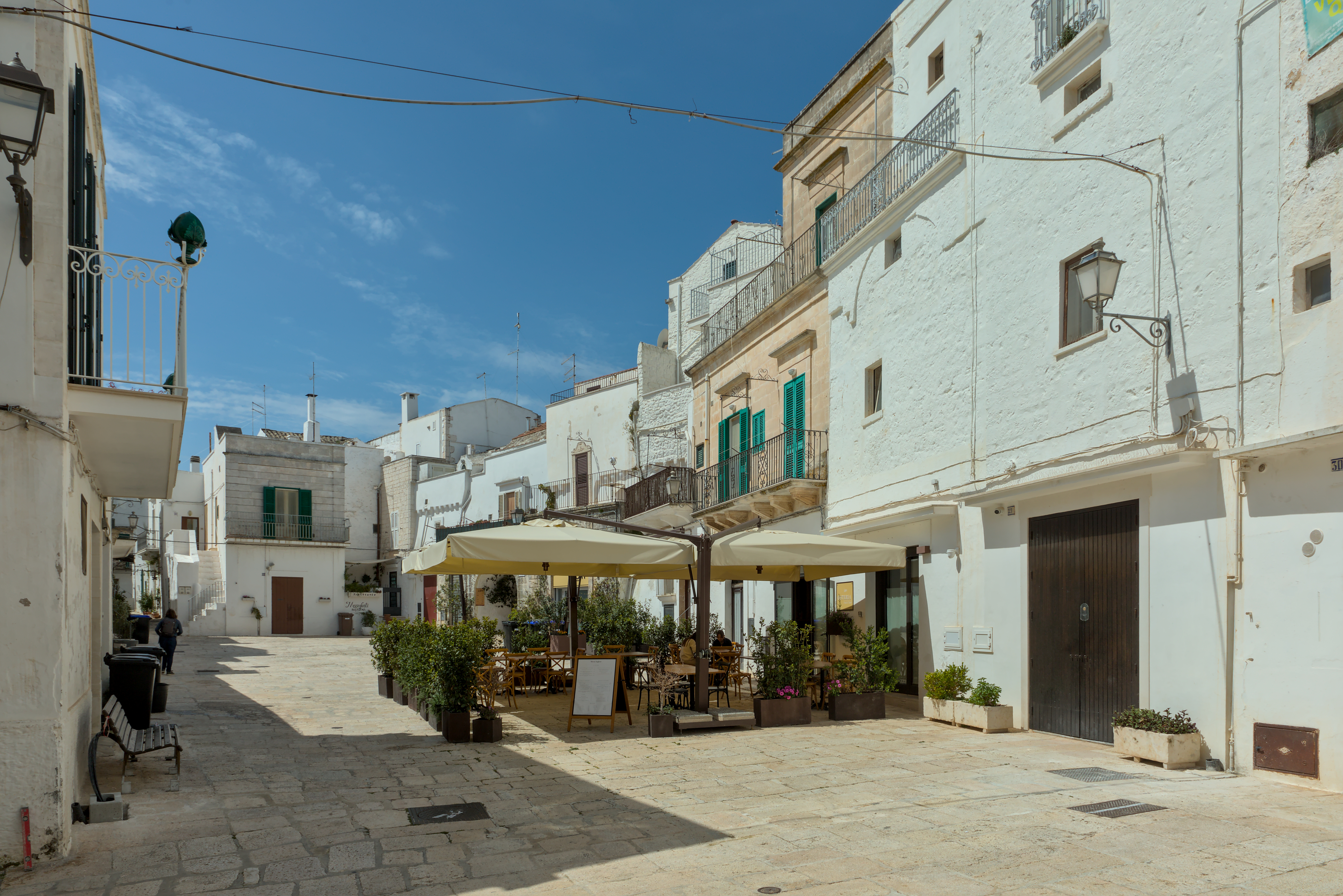
- Piazza Pellegrino Rossi, in the old town

- Coat of arms

- Location within Italy Location within Apulia
- Coordinates: 40°44′N 17°26′E
- Country: Italy
- Region: Apulia
- Province: Brindisi (BR)
- Frazioni: Caranna, Casalini, Marinelli, Sisto

Government
  - Mayor: Luca Convertini

Area
  - Total: 54.17 km^{2} (20.92 sq mi)
- Elevation: 392 m (1,286 ft)

Population (28 February 2014)
  - Total: 11,600
  - Density: 214/km^{2} (555/sq mi)
- Demonym: Cistranesi
- Time zone: UTC+1 (CET)
  - Summer (DST): UTC+2 (CEST)
- Postal code: 72014
- Dialing code: 080
- Patron saint: St. Quiricus
- Saint day: July 15
- Website: Official website

Cisternino (Barese: Cïsterninë) is a comune in the province of Brindisi in Apulia, on the coast of south-eastern Italy, approximately 50 kilometres (31 mi) north-west of the city of Brindisi. It is one of I Borghi più belli d'Italia ("The most beautiful villages of Italy"). Its main economic activities are tourism, the growing of olives and grapes, and dairy farming.

Cisternino sits in a historic zone of Itria Valley (in Italian: Valle d'Itria), known for its prehistoric conical, dry stone houses called trulli, which are preserved under UNESCO safeguards due to their cultural significance, dry stone walls (muretti a secco), and its fertile soil which makes it the home of the Salento wine region. In 2014, Cisternino was declared the Cittaslow City of the Year.

== Main sights ==
The architecture is typical of the region with an old Centro Storico (Historical Centre) containing white-washed, stone buildings with cool, shaded, cave-like interiors, narrow streets and churches. The town also features several community squares, each of which is built on the edge of the hill allowing for some spectacular landscapes.

In Cisternino and the surrounding area there have been several Bronze Age finds, including different types of hand tools. Evidence would suggest that the region was also a seasonal home to ancient hunter-gatherer humans.

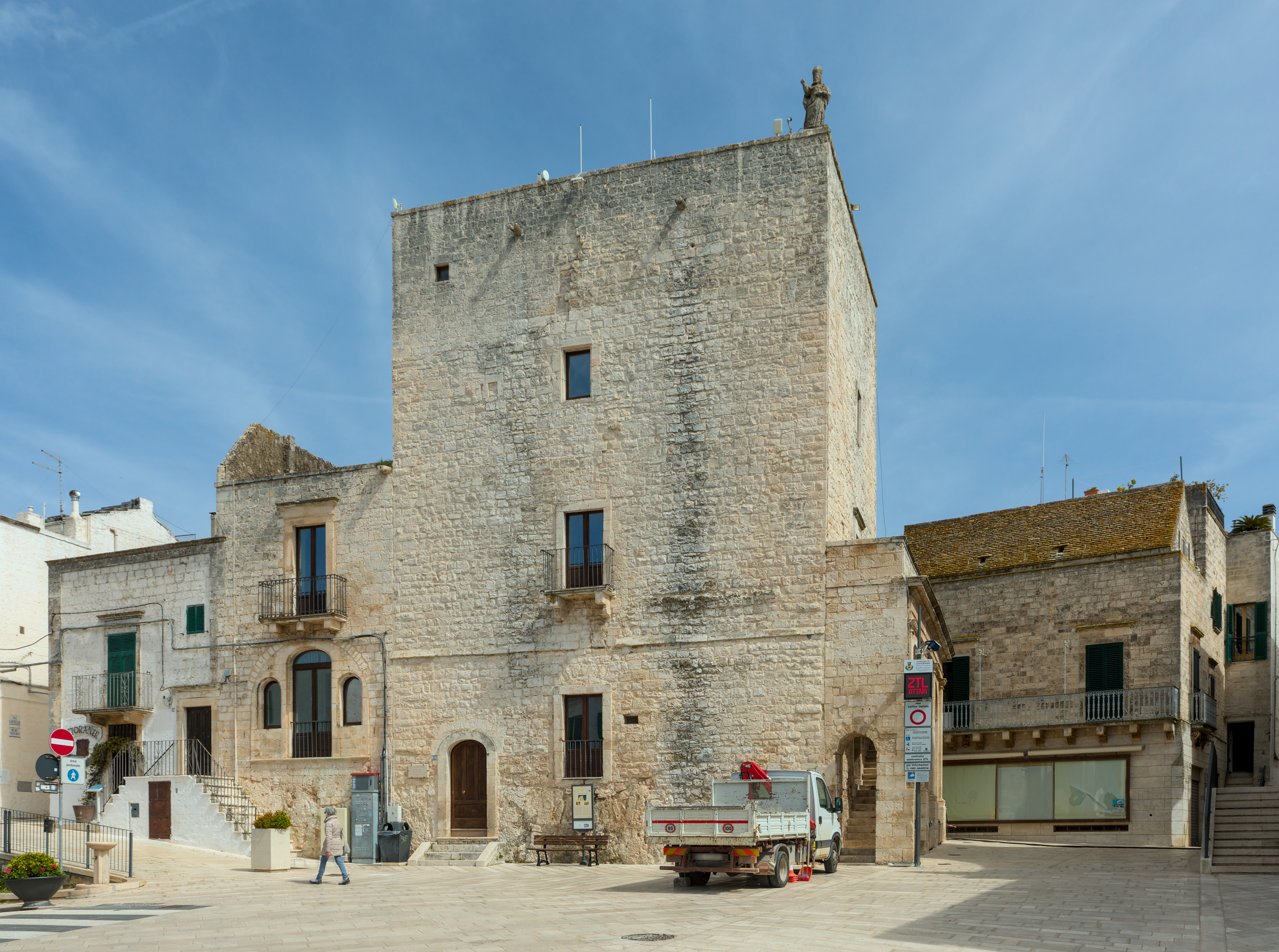
The Norman-Swabian tower

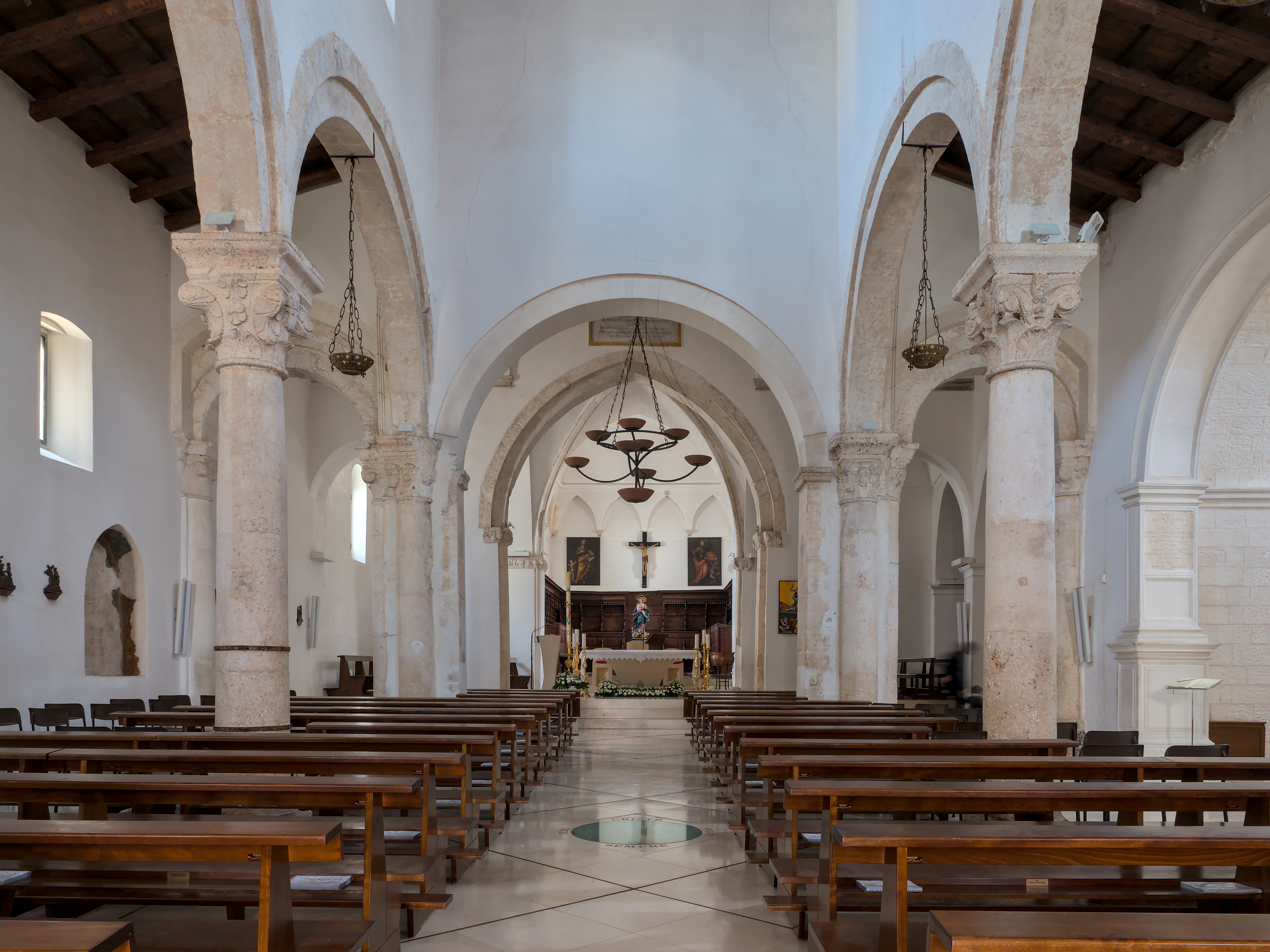
Interior of Chiesa Madre

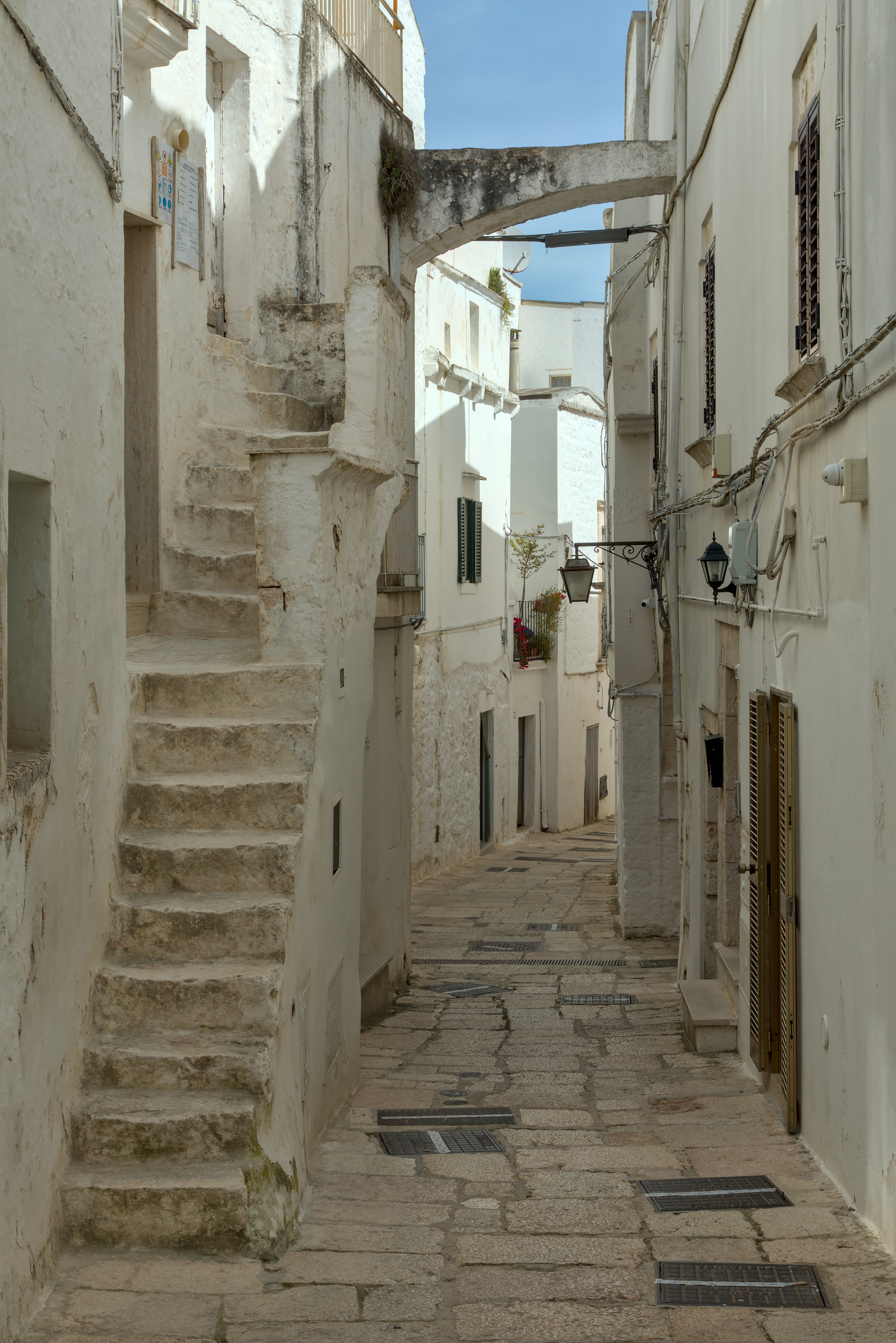
A typical street in the old town, narrow, with white facades and exterior stairs

== Food ==
Broad beans purée with wild chicory (fave e cicorie selvatiche), orecchiette con braciole e polpette (a particular shape of pasta with tomato sauce, stuffed beef rolls and bread balls on the side to dip in the sauce at the end) and "bombette" (a type of roasted pork rolls) are three typical dishes of Cisternino cuisine.

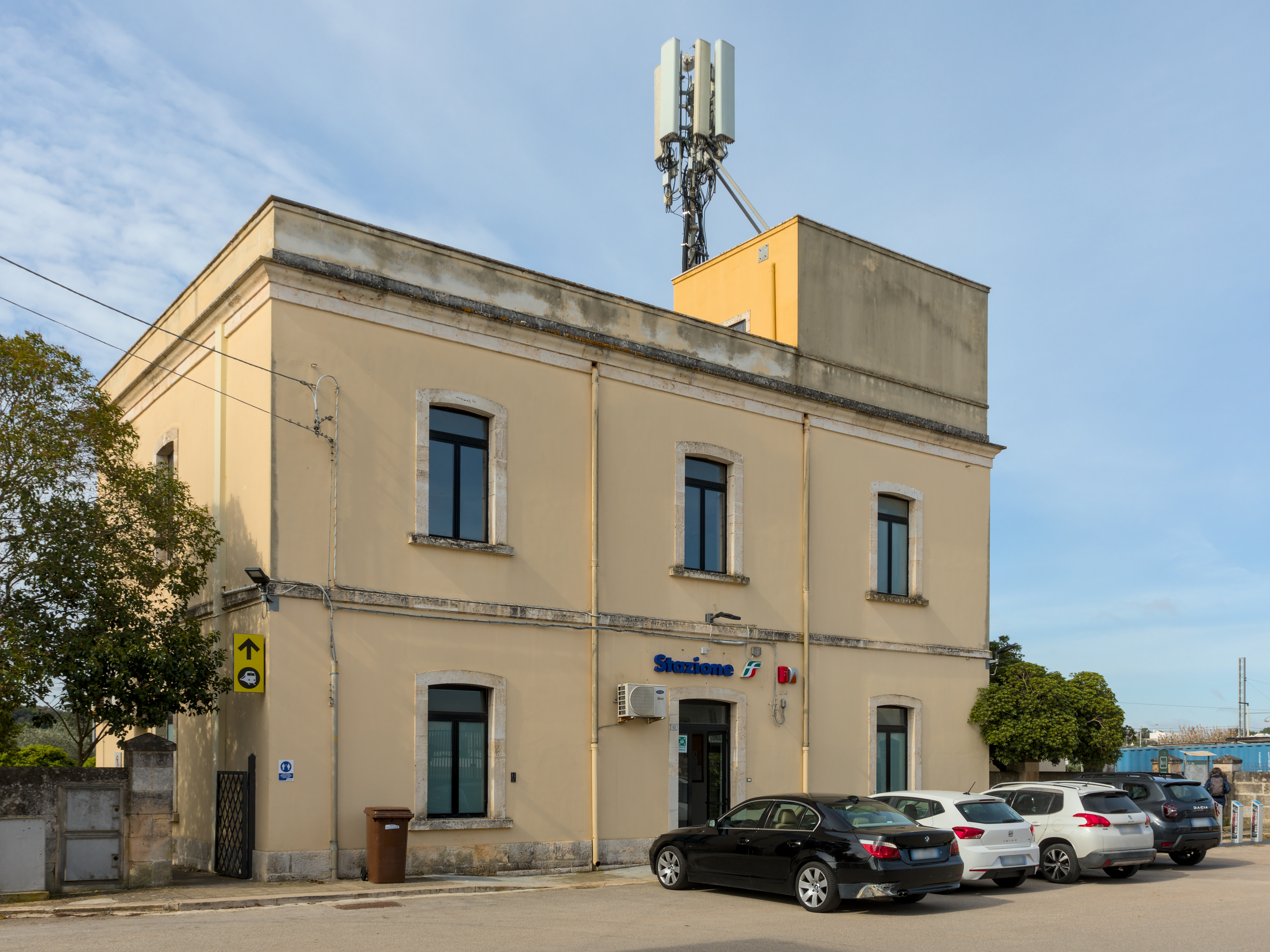
The train station.

== Transport ==
Public transport in Cisternino is minimal, with a large proportion of the inhabitants relying on their own means of transport. However, there are buses to nearby Fasano which also houses the nearest major train station.

The nearest airports are in the cities of Bari and Brindisi which are both less than one hour’s drive from Cisternino.

== Twin towns ==
- Kreuzlingen, Switzerland

== Notable people ==
- Lisetta Carmi - photographer
- Una Chi - novelist, translator
