= List of municipalities of the Province of Lecce =

The following is a list of the 96 municipalities (comuni) of the Province of Lecce in the region of Apulia in Italy.

== List ==
Municipality	Population (2026)	Area (km²)	Density
Alessano	5,982	28.69	208.5
Alezio	5,644	16.79	336.2
Alliste	6,344	23.53	269.6
Andrano	4,406	15.71	280.5
Aradeo	8,798	8.58	1,025.4
Arnesano	3,903	13.56	287.8
Bagnolo del Salento	1,698	6.74	251.9
Botrugno	2,570	9.75	263.6
Calimera	6,633	11.18	593.3
Campi Salentina	9,615	45.88	209.6
Cannole	1,568	20.35	77.1
Caprarica di Lecce	2,243	10.71	209.4
Carmiano	11,646	24.24	480.4
Carpignano Salentino	3,615	48.99	73.8
Casarano	18,940	38.73	489.0
Castri di Lecce	2,694	12.95	208.0
Castrignano de' Greci	3,632	9.62	377.5
Castrignano del Capo	5,055	20.77	243.4
Castro	2,274	4.56	498.7
Cavallino	12,993	22.65	573.6
Collepasso	5,452	12.79	426.3
Copertino	22,698	58.53	387.8
Corigliano d'Otranto	5,519	28.41	194.3
Corsano	5,049	9.12	553.6
Cursi	3,769	8.36	450.8
Cutrofiano	8,638	56.81	152.1
Diso	2,792	11.42	244.5
Gagliano del Capo	4,779	16.60	287.9
Galatina	25,173	82.65	304.6
Galatone	14,855	47.08	315.5
Gallipoli	18,826	41.22	456.7
Giuggianello	1,118	10.27	108.9
Giurdignano	1,936	14.04	137.9
Guagnano	5,279	38.03	138.8
Lecce	94,387	241.00	391.6
Lequile	8,600	36.80	233.7
Leverano	13,334	49.50	269.4
Lizzanello	12,029	25.42	473.2
Maglie	13,061	22.66	576.4
Martano	8,397	22.25	377.4
Martignano	1,525	6.49	235.0
Matino	10,754	26.63	403.8
Melendugno	10,093	92.31	109.3
Melissano	6,537	12.55	520.9
Melpignano	2,154	11.10	194.1
Miggiano	3,222	7.80	413.1
Minervino di Lecce	3,392	18.13	187.1
Monteroni di Lecce	13,147	16.74	785.4
Montesano Salentino	2,590	8.53	303.6
Morciano di Leuca	3,030	13.57	223.3
Muro Leccese	4,574	16.77	272.7
Nardò	30,784	193.24	159.3
Neviano	4,755	16.30	291.7
Nociglia	2,093	11.13	188.1
Novoli	7,426	18.08	410.7
Ortelle	2,194	10.23	214.5
Otranto	5,587	77.20	72.4
Palmariggi	1,346	8.97	150.1
Parabita	8,686	21.09	411.9
Patù	1,644	8.69	189.2
Poggiardo	5,745	19.96	287.8
Porto Cesareo	6,484	35.13	184.6
Presicce-Acquarica	9,040	43.06	209.9
Racale	10,670	24.29	439.3
Ruffano	9,217	39.73	232.0
Salice Salentino	7,549	59.87	126.1
Salve	4,580	33.07	138.5
San Cassiano	1,936	8.77	220.8
San Cesario di Lecce	7,787	8.09	962.5
San Donato di Lecce	5,350	21.58	247.9
San Pietro in Lama	3,344	8.20	407.8
Sanarica	1,475	13.02	113.3
Sannicola	5,540	27.64	200.4
Santa Cesarea Terme	2,764	116.14	23.8
Scorrano	6,542	35.33	185.2
Seclì	1,784	8.78	203.2
Sogliano Cavour	3,810	5.33	714.8
Soleto	5,086	30.46	167.0
Specchia	4,453	25.10	177.4
Spongano	3,399	12.42	273.7
Squinzano	13,235	29.78	444.4
Sternatia	2,072	16.76	123.6
Supersano	4,036	36.41	110.8
Surano	1,474	8.99	164.0
Surbo	14,481	20.78	696.9
Taurisano	11,059	23.68	467.0
Taviano	11,363	22.13	513.5
Tiggiano	2,825	7.71	366.4
Trepuzzi	13,764	23.43	587.5
Tricase	16,938	43.33	390.9
Tuglie	5,018	8.50	590.4
Ugento	11,923	100.40	118.8
Uggiano La Chiesa	4,322	14.46	298.9
Veglie	13,053	62.31	209.5
Vernole	6,522	61.28	106.4
Zollino	1,810	9.95	181.9

== See also ==
- List of municipalities of Apulia
- List of municipalities of Italy
