= List of municipalities of Apulia =

Location of Apulia (Puglia) within Italy

Provinces of Apulia

The following is a list of the municipalities (comuni) of the region of Apulia in Italy.

There are 257 municipalities in Apulia as of 2026:

- 41 in the Metropolitan City of Bari
- 10 in the Province of Barletta-Andria-Trani
- 20 in the Province of Brindisi
- 61 in the Province of Foggia
- 96 in the Province of Lecce
- 29 in the Province of Taranto

== List ==
Municipality	Province	Population (2026)	Area (km^{2})	Density
Accadia	Foggia	2,204	30.74	71.7
Acquaviva delle Fonti	Bari	19,680	132.03	149.1
Adelfia	Bari	16,371	29.81	549.2
Alberobello	Bari	10,029	40.82	245.7
Alberona	Foggia	836	49.75	16.8
Alessano	Lecce	5,982	28.69	208.5
Alezio	Lecce	5,644	16.79	336.2
Alliste	Lecce	6,344	23.53	269.6
Altamura	Bari	70,336	431.38	163.0
Andrano	Lecce	4,406	15.71	280.5
Andria	Barletta-Andria-Trani	96,520	402.89	239.6
Anzano di Puglia	Foggia	1,055	11.02	95.7
Apricena	Foggia	12,486	172.51	72.4
Aradeo	Lecce	8,798	8.58	1,025.4
Arnesano	Lecce	3,903	13.56	287.8
Ascoli Satriano	Foggia	5,634	336.68	16.7
Avetrana	Taranto	6,109	74.17	82.4
Bagnolo del Salento	Lecce	1,698	6.74	251.9
Bari	Bari	316,248	117.39	2,694.0
Barletta	Barletta-Andria-Trani	92,067	149.35	616.5
Biccari	Foggia	2,579	106.65	24.2
Binetto	Bari	2,184	17.65	123.7
Bisceglie	Barletta-Andria-Trani	53,242	69.25	768.8
Bitetto	Bari	11,745	33.95	345.9
Bitonto	Bari	52,868	174.34	303.2
Bitritto	Bari	11,456	17.98	637.2
Botrugno	Lecce	2,570	9.75	263.6
Bovino	Foggia	2,862	84.93	33.7
Brindisi	Brindisi	81,181	332.98	243.8
Cagnano Varano	Foggia	6,525	166.84	39.1
Calimera	Lecce	6,633	11.18	593.3
Campi Salentina	Lecce	9,615	45.88	209.6
Candela	Foggia	2,696	96.82	27.8
Cannole	Lecce	1,568	20.35	77.1
Canosa di Puglia	Barletta-Andria-Trani	27,275	150.93	180.7
Caprarica di Lecce	Lecce	2,243	10.71	209.4
Capurso	Bari	15,107	15.14	997.8
Carapelle	Foggia	6,868	25.00	274.7
Carlantino	Foggia	746	34.71	21.5
Carmiano	Lecce	11,646	24.24	480.4
Carosino	Taranto	6,380	10.93	583.7
Carovigno	Brindisi	17,093	106.62	160.3
Carpignano Salentino	Lecce	3,615	48.99	73.8
Carpino	Foggia	3,698	80.05	46.2
Casalnuovo Monterotaro	Foggia	1,402	48.36	29.0
Casalvecchio di Puglia	Foggia	1,620	31.93	50.7
Casamassima	Bari	19,093	78.43	243.4
Casarano	Lecce	18,940	38.73	489.0
Cassano delle Murge	Bari	15,282	90.20	169.4
Castellana Grotte	Bari	19,702	69.13	285.0
Castellaneta	Taranto	15,798	242.32	65.2
Castelluccio dei Sauri	Foggia	1,958	51.47	38.0
Castelluccio Valmaggiore	Foggia	1,177	26.79	43.9
Castelnuovo della Daunia	Foggia	1,218	61.49	19.8
Castri di Lecce	Lecce	2,694	12.95	208.0
Castrignano de' Greci	Lecce	3,632	9.62	377.5
Castrignano del Capo	Lecce	5,055	20.77	243.4
Castro	Lecce	2,274	4.56	498.7
Cavallino	Lecce	12,993	22.65	573.6
Ceglie Messapica	Brindisi	18,363	132.02	139.1
Celenza Valfortore	Foggia	1,267	65.42	19.4
Cellamare	Bari	5,761	5.91	974.8
Celle di San Vito	Foggia	143	18.41	7.8
Cellino San Marco	Brindisi	5,889	37.84	155.6
Cerignola	Foggia	56,711	593.93	95.5
Chieuti	Foggia	1,467	61.52	23.8
Cisternino	Brindisi	10,954	54.17	202.2
Collepasso	Lecce	5,452	12.79	426.3
Conversano	Bari	25,993	128.42	202.4
Copertino	Lecce	22,698	58.53	387.8
Corato	Bari	46,845	169.35	276.6
Corigliano d'Otranto	Lecce	5,519	28.41	194.3
Corsano	Lecce	5,049	9.12	553.6
Crispiano	Taranto	12,816	112.30	114.1
Cursi	Lecce	3,769	8.36	450.8
Cutrofiano	Lecce	8,638	56.81	152.1
Deliceto	Foggia	3,424	75.85	45.1
Diso	Lecce	2,792	11.42	244.5
Erchie	Brindisi	8,041	44.63	180.2
Faeto	Foggia	624	26.10	23.9
Faggiano	Taranto	3,366	21.06	159.8
Fasano	Brindisi	38,747	131.72	294.2
Foggia	Foggia	145,078	509.26	284.9
Fragagnano	Taranto	4,889	22.41	218.2
Francavilla Fontana	Brindisi	34,352	177.94	193.1
Gagliano del Capo	Lecce	4,779	16.60	287.9
Galatina	Lecce	25,173	82.65	304.6
Galatone	Lecce	14,855	47.08	315.5
Gallipoli	Lecce	18,826	41.22	456.7
Ginosa	Taranto	21,721	188.49	115.2
Gioia del Colle	Bari	26,433	208.94	126.5
Giovinazzo	Bari	19,087	44.30	430.9
Giuggianello	Lecce	1,118	10.27	108.9
Giurdignano	Lecce	1,936	14.04	137.9
Gravina In Puglia	Bari	41,990	384.74	109.1
Grottaglie	Taranto	29,976	102.12	293.5
Grumo Appula	Bari	11,956	81.30	147.1
Guagnano	Lecce	5,279	38.03	138.8
Ischitella	Foggia	4,028	85.46	47.1
Isole Tremiti	Foggia	470	3.18	147.8
Laterza	Taranto	14,584	161.17	90.5
Latiano	Brindisi	13,222	55.38	238.8
Lecce	Lecce	94,387	241.00	391.6
Leporano	Taranto	8,202	15.33	535.0
Lequile	Lecce	8,600	36.80	233.7
Lesina	Foggia	6,255	160.16	39.1
Leverano	Lecce	13,334	49.50	269.4
Lizzanello	Lecce	12,029	25.42	473.2
Lizzano	Taranto	9,444	47.18	200.2
Locorotondo	Bari	13,792	48.19	286.2
Lucera	Foggia	30,335	339.79	89.3
Maglie	Lecce	13,061	22.66	576.4
Manduria	Taranto	29,528	180.41	163.7
Manfredonia	Foggia	53,015	354.54	149.5
Margherita di Savoia	Barletta-Andria-Trani	11,025	35.70	308.8
Martano	Lecce	8,397	22.25	377.4
Martignano	Lecce	1,525	6.49	235.0
Martina Franca	Taranto	46,753	298.72	156.5
Maruggio	Taranto	5,138	49.07	104.7
Massafra	Taranto	31,766	128.00	248.2
Matino	Lecce	10,754	26.63	403.8
Mattinata	Foggia	5,840	73.48	79.5
Melendugno	Lecce	10,093	92.31	109.3
Melissano	Lecce	6,537	12.55	520.9
Melpignano	Lecce	2,154	11.10	194.1
Mesagne	Brindisi	25,738	124.05	207.5
Miggiano	Lecce	3,222	7.80	413.1
Minervino di Lecce	Lecce	3,392	18.13	187.1
Minervino Murge	Barletta-Andria-Trani	7,811	257.41	30.3
Modugno	Bari	35,993	32.24	1,116.4
Mola di Bari	Bari	24,095	50.94	473.0
Molfetta	Bari	57,016	58.97	966.9
Monopoli	Bari	47,657	157.89	301.8
Monte Sant'Angelo	Foggia	10,891	245.13	44.4
Monteiasi	Taranto	5,190	9.75	532.3
Monteleone di Puglia	Foggia	914	36.42	25.1
Montemesola	Taranto	3,467	16.43	211.0
Monteparano	Taranto	2,239	3.85	581.6
Monteroni di Lecce	Lecce	13,147	16.74	785.4
Montesano Salentino	Lecce	2,590	8.53	303.6
Morciano di Leuca	Lecce	3,030	13.57	223.3
Motta Montecorvino	Foggia	583	19.94	29.2
Mottola	Taranto	15,103	213.96	70.6
Muro Leccese	Lecce	4,574	16.77	272.7
Nardò	Lecce	30,784	193.24	159.3
Neviano	Lecce	4,755	16.30	291.7
Noci	Bari	18,095	150.60	120.2
Nociglia	Lecce	2,093	11.13	188.1
Noicattaro	Bari	25,766	40.79	631.7
Novoli	Lecce	7,426	18.08	410.7
Ordona	Foggia	3,366	39.57	85.1
Oria	Brindisi	14,364	83.67	171.7
Orsara di Puglia	Foggia	2,469	83.01	29.7
Orta Nova	Foggia	16,576	105.24	157.5
Ortelle	Lecce	2,194	10.23	214.5
Ostuni	Brindisi	29,803	225.56	132.1
Otranto	Lecce	5,587	77.20	72.4
Palagianello	Taranto	7,429	43.86	169.4
Palagiano	Taranto	15,712	69.97	224.6
Palmariggi	Lecce	1,346	8.97	150.1
Palo del Colle	Bari	20,253	79.71	254.1
Panni	Foggia	673	32.71	20.6
Parabita	Lecce	8,686	21.09	411.9
Patù	Lecce	1,644	8.69	189.2
Peschici	Foggia	4,291	49.39	86.9
Pietramontecorvino	Foggia	2,367	71.65	33.0
Poggiardo	Lecce	5,745	19.96	287.8
Poggio Imperiale	Foggia	2,551	52.88	48.2
Poggiorsini	Bari	1,240	43.44	28.5
Polignano A Mare	Bari	17,271	63.09	273.8
Porto Cesareo	Lecce	6,484	35.13	184.6
Presicce-Acquarica	Lecce	9,040	43.06	209.9
Pulsano	Taranto	11,162	18.27	610.9
Putignano	Bari	25,696	100.16	256.5
Racale	Lecce	10,670	24.29	439.3
Rignano Garganico	Foggia	1,722	89.40	19.3
Roccaforzata	Taranto	1,729	6.15	281.1
Rocchetta Sant'Antonio	Foggia	1,597	72.48	22.0
Rodi Garganico	Foggia	3,306	13.45	245.8
Roseto Valfortore	Foggia	982	50.06	19.6
Ruffano	Lecce	9,217	39.73	232.0
Rutigliano	Bari	18,254	53.85	339.0
Ruvo di Puglia	Bari	24,092	223.83	107.6
Salice Salentino	Lecce	7,549	59.87	126.1
Salve	Lecce	4,580	33.07	138.5
Sammichele di Bari	Bari	5,921	34.23	173.0
San Cassiano	Lecce	1,936	8.77	220.8
San Cesario di Lecce	Lecce	7,787	8.09	962.5
San Donaci	Brindisi	6,050	34.04	177.7
San Donato di Lecce	Lecce	5,350	21.58	247.9
San Ferdinando di Puglia	Barletta-Andria-Trani	13,855	41.23	336.0
San Giorgio Ionico	Taranto	13,850	23.56	587.9
San Giovanni Rotondo	Foggia	26,129	261.88	99.8
San Marco in Lamis	Foggia	12,205	234.20	52.1
San Marco la Catola	Foggia	810	28.63	28.3
San Marzano di San Giuseppe	Taranto	8,796	19.19	458.4
San Michele Salentino	Brindisi	6,006	26.53	226.4
San Nicandro Garganico	Foggia	13,367	173.36	77.1
San Pancrazio Salentino	Brindisi	8,958	56.68	158.0
San Paolo di Civitate	Foggia	5,322	91.16	58.4
San Pietro in Lama	Lecce	3,344	8.20	407.8
San Pietro Vernotico	Brindisi	12,807	46.94	272.8
San Severo	Foggia	48,807	336.31	145.1
San Vito dei Normanni	Brindisi	17,793	67.08	265.3
Sanarica	Lecce	1,475	13.02	113.3
Sannicandro di Bari	Bari	9,608	56.79	169.2
Sannicola	Lecce	5,540	27.64	200.4
Sant'Agata di Puglia	Foggia	1,737	26.82	64.8
Santa Cesarea Terme	Lecce	2,764	116.14	23.8
Santeramo in Colle	Bari	25,578	144.86	176.6
Sava	Taranto	15,033	44.57	337.3
Scorrano	Lecce	6,542	35.33	185.2
Seclì	Lecce	1,784	8.78	203.2
Serracapriola	Foggia	3,528	143.36	24.6
Sogliano Cavour	Lecce	3,810	5.33	714.8
Soleto	Lecce	5,086	30.46	167.0
Specchia	Lecce	4,453	25.10	177.4
Spinazzola	Barletta-Andria-Trani	5,794	184.01	31.5
Spongano	Lecce	3,399	12.42	273.7
Squinzano	Lecce	13,235	29.78	444.4
Statte	Taranto	12,540	67.32	186.3
Sternatia	Lecce	2,072	16.76	123.6
Stornara	Foggia	5,778	33.86	170.6
Stornarella	Foggia	5,402	33.81	159.8
Supersano	Lecce	4,036	36.41	110.8
Surano	Lecce	1,474	8.99	164.0
Surbo	Lecce	14,481	20.78	696.9
Taranto	Taranto	185,112	249.86	740.9
Taurisano	Lecce	11,059	23.68	467.0
Taviano	Lecce	11,363	22.13	513.5
Terlizzi	Bari	25,958	69.23	375.0
Tiggiano	Lecce	2,825	7.71	366.4
Torchiarolo	Brindisi	5,286	32.34	163.5
Toritto	Bari	7,953	75.35	105.5
Torre Santa Susanna	Brindisi	10,045	55.77	180.1
Torremaggiore	Foggia	16,283	210.01	77.5
Torricella	Taranto	4,096	26.93	152.1
Trani	Barletta-Andria-Trani	54,731	103.41	529.3
Trepuzzi	Lecce	13,764	23.43	587.5
Tricase	Lecce	16,938	43.33	390.9
Triggiano	Bari	25,558	20.11	1,270.9
Trinitapoli	Barletta-Andria-Trani	13,613	148.77	91.5
Troia	Foggia	6,491	168.25	38.6
Tuglie	Lecce	5,018	8.50	590.4
Turi	Bari	12,972	71.40	181.7
Ugento	Lecce	11,923	100.40	118.8
Uggiano La Chiesa	Lecce	4,322	14.46	298.9
Valenzano	Bari	17,139	15.98	1,072.5
Veglie	Lecce	13,053	62.31	209.5
Vernole	Lecce	6,522	61.28	106.4
Vico del Gargano	Foggia	7,152	111.08	64.4
Vieste	Foggia	13,234	169.19	78.2
Villa Castelli	Brindisi	8,939	35.15	254.3
Volturara Appula	Foggia	340	52.00	6.5
Volturino	Foggia	1,499	58.35	25.7
Zapponeta	Foggia	3,192	41.75	76.5
Zollino	Lecce	1,810	9.95	181.9
