= Parabita =

Parabita Griko: Bàusta
- Comune
- Comune di Parabita
- Location within Italy Location within Apulia
- Coordinates: 40°3′N 18°8′E
- Country: Italy
- Region: Apulia
- Province: Lecce (LE)
- Frazioni: Alezio, Collepasso, Matino, Tuglie

Area
  - Total: 20 km^{2} (7.7 sq mi)
- Elevation: 80 m (260 ft)

Population (30 November 2008)
  - Total: 9,477
  - Density: 470/km^{2} (1,200/sq mi)
- Demonym: Parabitani
- Time zone: UTC+1 (CET)
  - Summer (DST): UTC+2 (CEST)
- Postal code: 73052
- Dialing code: 0833
- ISTAT code: 075059
- Patron saint: Santa Maria della Coltura
- Website: Official website

Parabita is a town and comune in the Italian province of Lecce in the Apulia region of south-east Italy.

The town is the home of Banca Popolare di Lecce (ex-Banca Popolare di Parabita e Aradeo), which was merged with other bank to form Banca Popolare Pugliese.

Its history goes back to prehistoric times; neolithic era huts were uncovered but archeologists say there was a human presence here even before that.
