= Sogliano =

Sogliano is an Italian placename and surname.

- Giovanni Antonio Sogliani (1492 – 1544) - Florentine painter

== Places in Italy ==
- Sogliano al Rubicone – in the province of Forlì-Cesena
- Sogliano Cavour – in the province of Forlì-Cesena-Lecce
