= San Cesario =

San Cesario may refer to:

- San Cesario di Lecce, a town and comune in the Italian province of Lecce in the Apulia region of south-east Italy
- San Cesario sul Panaro, a comune in the Province of Modena in the Italian region Emilia-Romagna
