= Alvania hallgassi =

Scientific classification
- Kingdom: Animalia
- Phylum: Mollusca
- Class: Gastropoda
- Subclass: Caenogastropoda
- Order: Littorinimorpha
- Family: Rissoidae
- Genus: Alvania
- Species: A. hallgassi

Binomial name
- Alvania hallgassi Amati & Oliverio, 1985

Species of gastropod

Alvania hallgassi is a species of small sea snail, a marine gastropod mollusk or micromollusk in the family Rissoidae.

== Description ==
The length of the shell varies between 2 mm and 3 mm.

== Distribution ==
This marine species occurs off Otranto, Italy; also off Greece.
