= San Cassiano =

- Comune
- Comune di San Cassiano
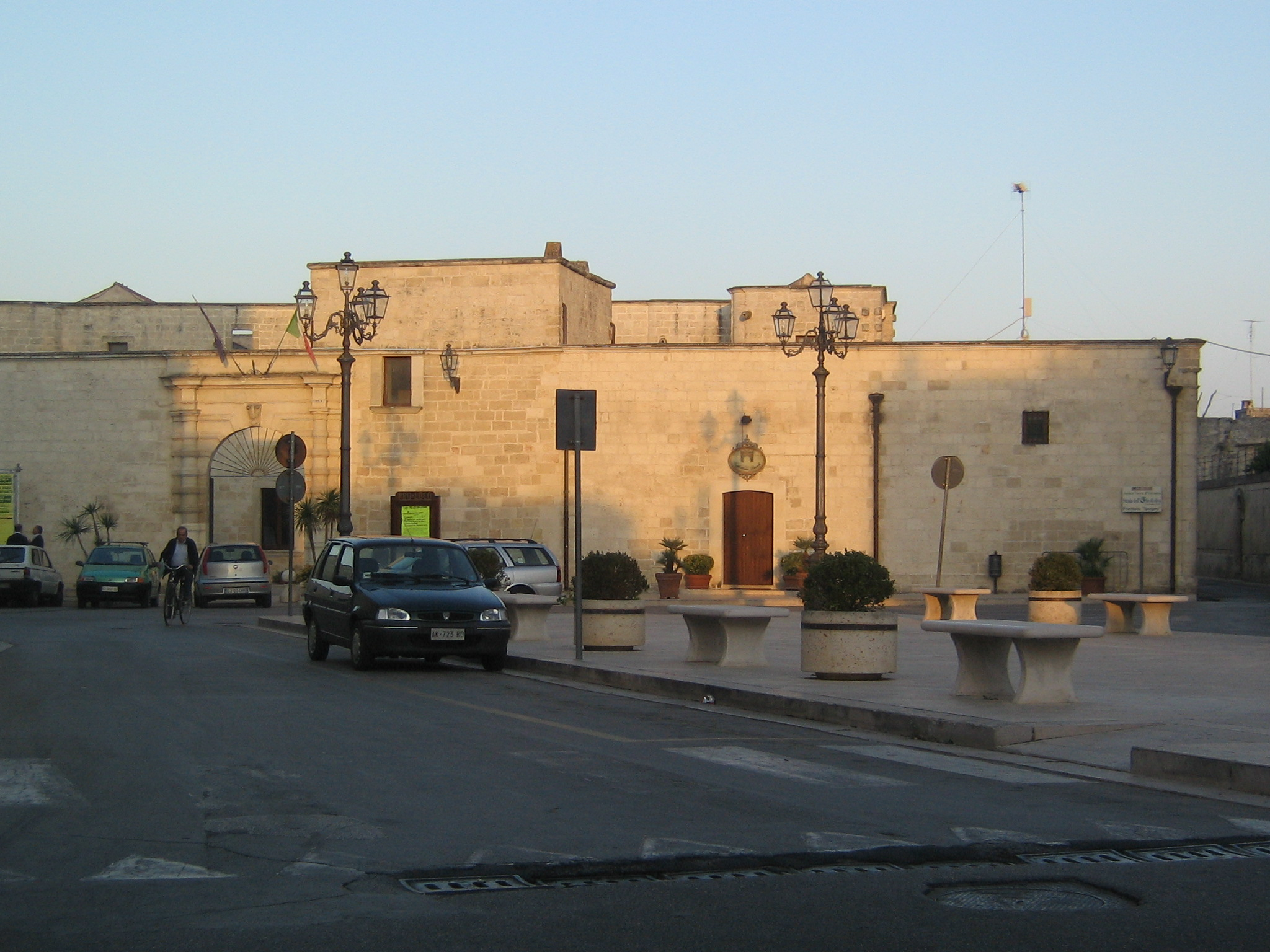
- Baronial palace

- Location within Italy Location within Apulia
- Coordinates: 40°3′N 18°20′E
- Country: Italy
- Region: Apulia
- Province: Lecce (LE)
- Frazioni: Botrugno, Nociglia, Poggiardo, Sanarica, Supersano

Area
  - Total: 8.55 km^{2} (3.30 sq mi)

Population (2008)
  - Total: 2,148
  - Density: 251/km^{2} (651/sq mi)
- Demonym: Sancassianesi
- Time zone: UTC+1 (CET)
  - Summer (DST): UTC+2 (CEST)
- Postal code: 73020
- Dialing code: 0836
- ISTAT code: 075095
- Patron saint: Martiri di Otranto and San Rocco
- Saint day: 18 August
- Website: Official website

San Cassiano is a town and comune in the Italian province of Lecce and region of Apulia in south-east Italy.
