= Supersano =

- Comune
- Comune di Supersano
- Location within Italy Location within Apulia
- Coordinates: 40°1′N 18°15′E
- Country: Italy
- Region: Apulia
- Province: Lecce (LE)
- Frazioni: Botrugno, Casarano, Collepasso, Cutrofiano, Montesano Salentino, Nociglia, Ruffano, San Cassiano, Scorrano

Area
  - Total: 36 km^{2} (14 sq mi)
- Elevation: 105 m (344 ft)

Population (November 2008)
  - Total: 4,508
  - Density: 130/km^{2} (320/sq mi)
- Demonym: Supersanesi
- Time zone: UTC+1 (CET)
  - Summer (DST): UTC+2 (CEST)
- Postal code: 73040
- Dialing code: 0833
- ISTAT code: 075081
- Patron saint: San Michele Arcangelo
- Saint day: 8 May
- Website: Official website

Supersano (Salentino: Supersanu) is a town and comune in the Italian province of Lecce in the Apulia region of south-east Italy.
