= Surano =

- Comune
- Comune di Surano
- Location within Italy Location within Apulia
- Coordinates: 40°2′N 18°21′E
- Country: Italy
- Region: Apulia
- Province: Lecce (LE)
- Frazioni: Andrano, Montesano Salentino, Nociglia, Poggiardo, Spongano

Area
  - Total: 8.85 km^{2} (3.42 sq mi)
- Elevation: 102 m (335 ft)

Population (November 2008)
  - Total: 1,701
  - Density: 192/km^{2} (498/sq mi)
- Demonym: Suranesi
- Time zone: UTC+1 (CET)
  - Summer (DST): UTC+2 (CEST)
- Postal code: 73030
- Dialing code: 0836
- ISTAT code: 075082
- Patron saint: Beati martiri di Otranto and San Rocco
- Saint day: 14–16 August

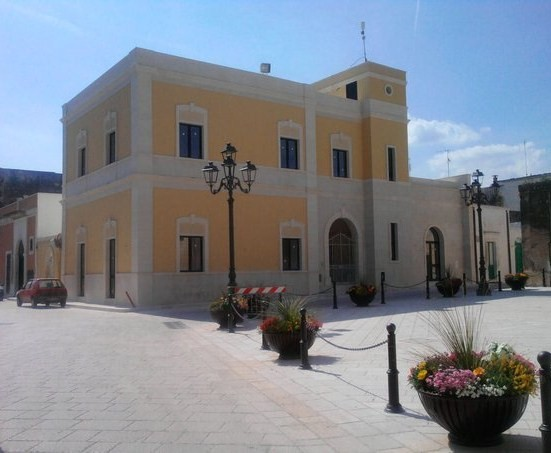

Surano is a town and comune in the Italian province of Lecce in the Apulia region of south-east Italy.
