= Palmariggi =

- Comune
- Comune di Palmariggi
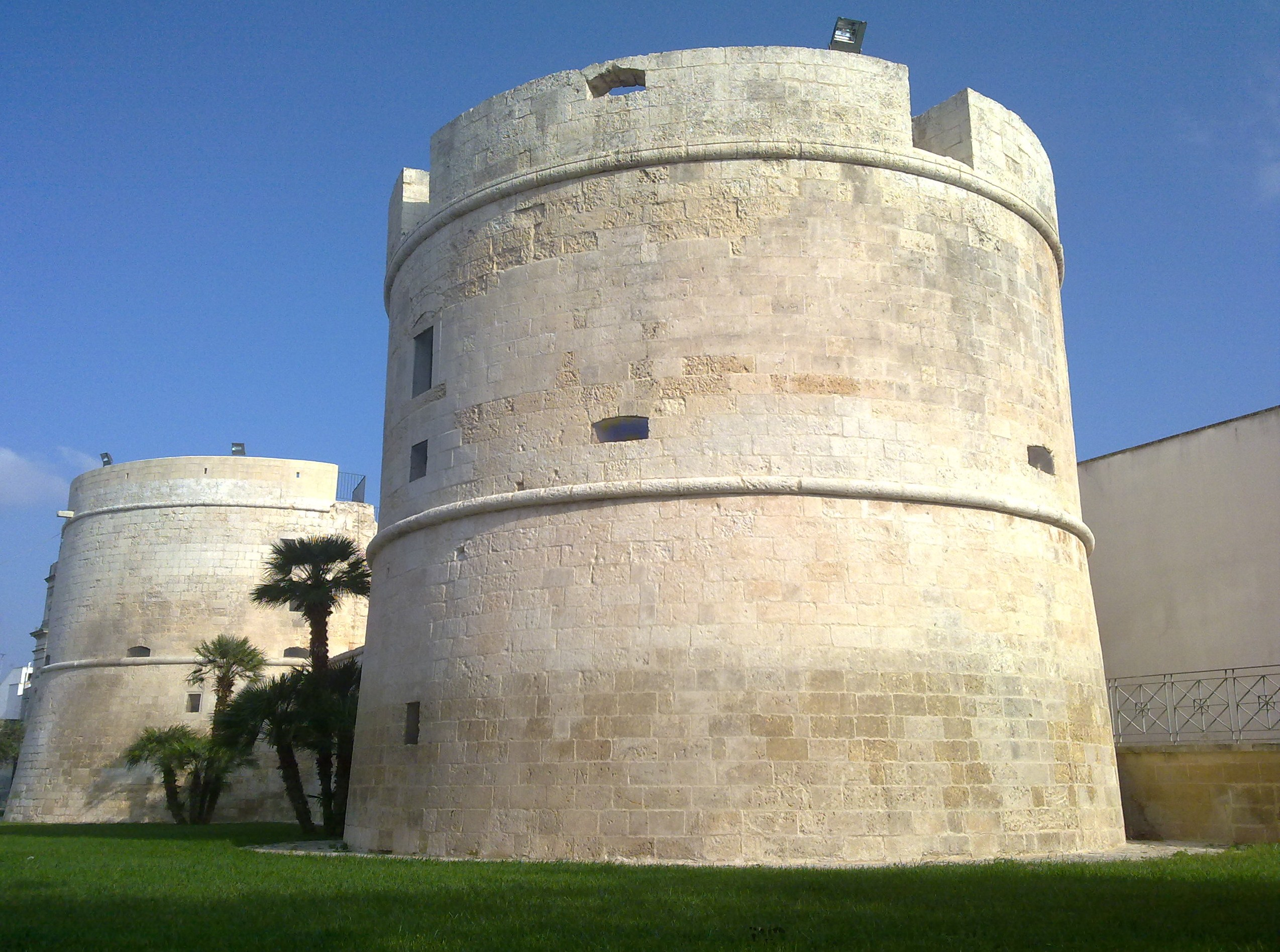
- Aragonese Castle

- Location within Italy Location within Apulia
- Coordinates: 40°8′N 18°23′E
- Country: Italy
- Region: Apulia
- Province: Lecce (LE)

Government
  - Mayor: Franco Zezza

Area
  - Total: 8.78 km^{2} (3.39 sq mi)
- Elevation: 99 m (325 ft)

Population (June 2023)
  - Total: 1,364
  - Density: 155/km^{2} (402/sq mi)
- Demonym: Palmariggini or Palmaricioti
- Time zone: UTC+1 (CET)
  - Summer (DST): UTC+2 (CEST)
- Postal code: 73020
- Dialing code: 0836
- ISTAT code: 075058
- Patron saint: SS. Madonna della Palma
- Saint day: Second Sunday after Easter
- Website: Official website

Palmariggi (Salentino: Parmarisci) is a town and comune in the province of Lecce in the Apulia region of south-east Italy.

== Main sights ==
- Mother church, dedicated to St. Luke the Evangelist, rebuilt after 1777
- Sanctuary of Madonna di Montevergine
- Aragonese Castle (15th century), of which only two towers remain
- Menhir of Montevergine
