= Sogliano Cavour =

Sogliano Cavour Sughiàna (Greek)
- Comune
- Comune di Sogliano Cavour
- Coat of arms

- Location within Italy Location within Apulia
- Coordinates: 40°9′N 18°12′E
- Country: Italy
- Region: Apulia
- Province: Lecce (LE)
- Frazioni: Corigliano d'Otranto, Cutrofiano, Galatina

Area
  - Total: 5 km^{2} (1.9 sq mi)
- Elevation: 75 m (246 ft)

Population (November 2008)
  - Total: 4,151
  - Density: 830/km^{2} (2,200/sq mi)
- Demonym: Soglianesi
- Time zone: UTC+1 (CET)
  - Summer (DST): UTC+2 (CEST)
- Postal code: 73010
- Dialing code: 0836
- ISTAT code: 075075
- Patron saint: San Lorenzo
- Saint day: 10 August
- Website: Official website

Sogliano Cavour (Griko: Sughiàna; Salentino: Sughiànu) is a town and comune in the Italian province of Lecce in the Apulia region of south-east Italy.
