= Alliste =

Alliste Griko: Kallísti
- Comune
- Comune di Alliste
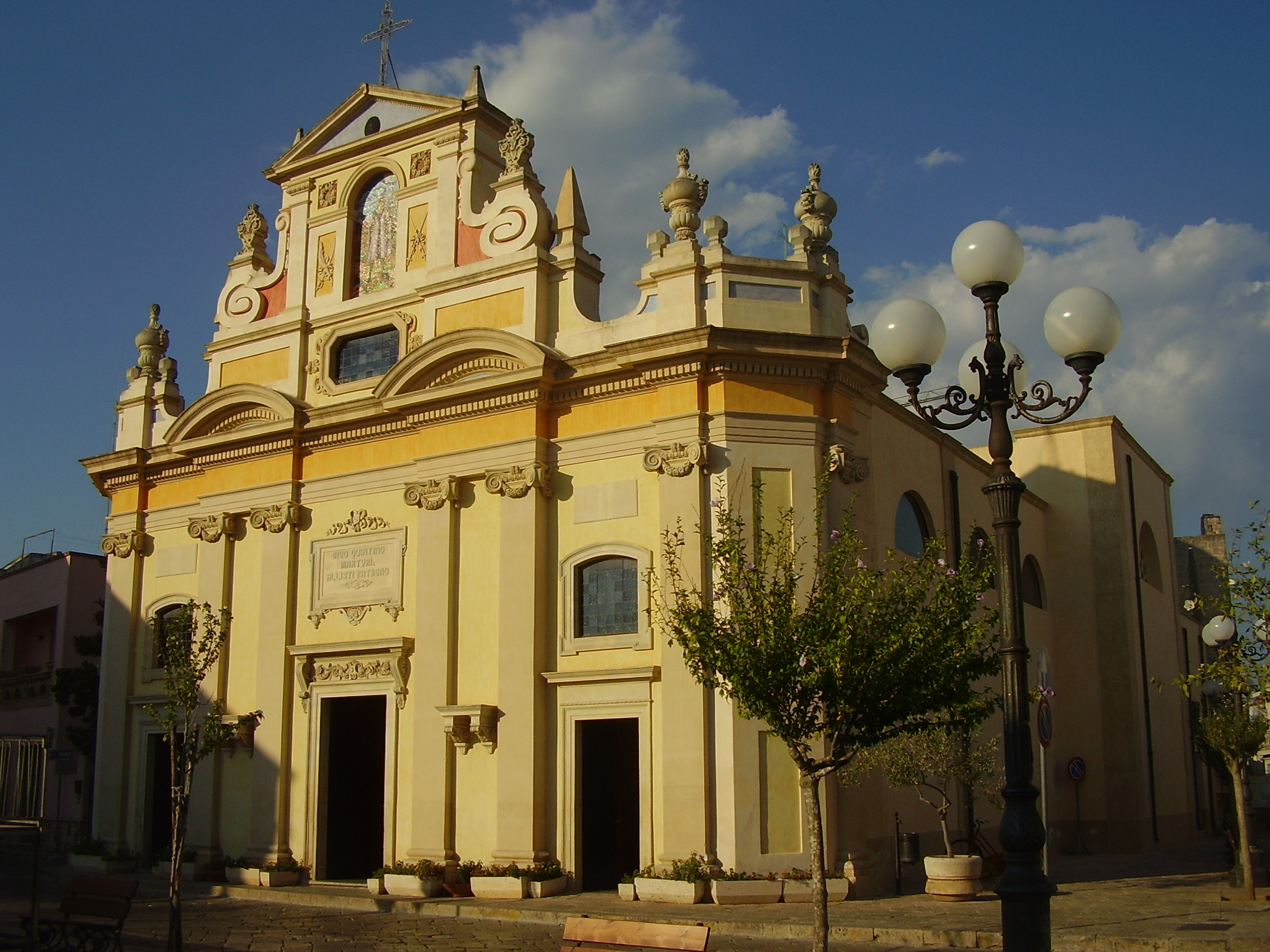
- Mother church of San Quintino.

- Location within Italy Location within Apulia
- Coordinates: 39°57′N 18°5′E
- Country: Italy
- Region: Apulia
- Province: Lecce (LE)
- Frazioni: Capilungo, Felline, Posto Rosso

Government
  - Mayor: Renato Rizzo

Area
  - Total: 23.53 km^{2} (9.08 sq mi)
- Elevation: 54 m (177 ft)

Population (30 April 2017)
  - Total: 6,708
  - Density: 285.1/km^{2} (738.4/sq mi)
- Demonyms: Allistini
- Time zone: UTC+1 (CET)
  - Summer (DST): UTC+2 (CEST)
- Postal code: 73040
- Dialing code: 0833
- ISTAT code: 075004
- Patron saint: Saint Quentin
- Saint day: 31 October
- Website: Official website

Alliste (Salentino: Caḍḍiste) is a town and comune in the province of Lecce in the Apulia region of south-east Italy.
