= Ortelle =

- Comune
- Comune di Ortelle
- Location within Italy Location within Apulia
- Coordinates: 40°2′N 18°24′E
- Country: Italy
- Region: Apulia
- Province: Lecce (LE)
- Frazioni: Vignacastrisi

Area
  - Total: 9 km^{2} (3.5 sq mi)
- Elevation: 110 m (360 ft)

Population (30 November 2008)
  - Total: 2,440
  - Density: 270/km^{2} (700/sq mi)
- Demonym: Ortellesi
- Time zone: UTC+1 (CET)
  - Summer (DST): UTC+2 (CEST)
- Postal code: 73030
- Dialing code: 0836
- ISTAT code: 075056
- Patron saint: San Giorgio
- Saint day: 23 April
- Website: Official website

Ortelle (Salentino: Arteḍḍhre) is a town and comune in the Italian province of Lecce in the Apulia region of south-east Italy. The 19th-century pastel painter Giuseppe Casciaro was born in Ortelle.
