= San Pietro in Lama =

- Comune
- Comune di San Pietro in Lama
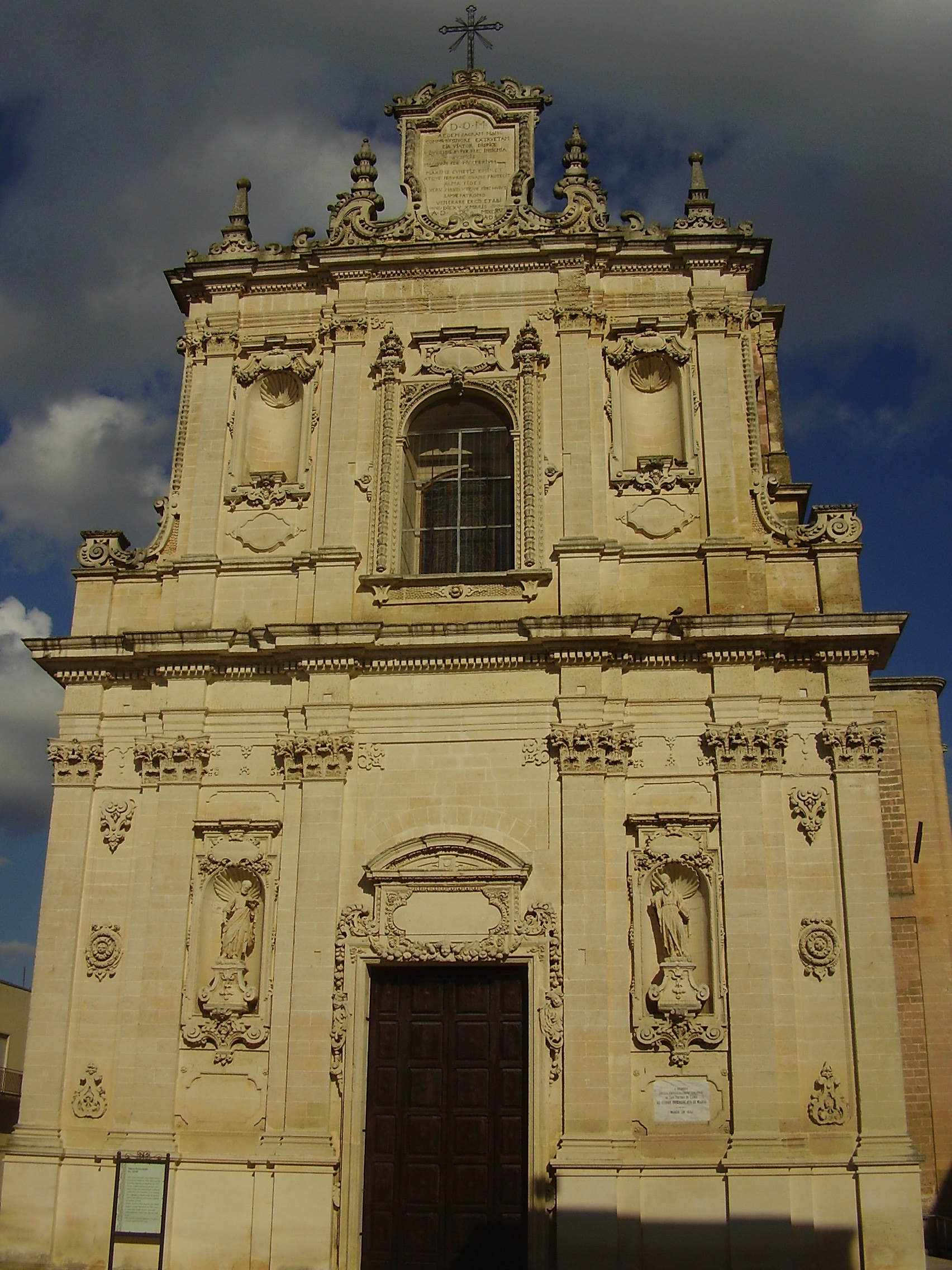
- Mother Church (Chiesa Madre).

- Coat of arms

- Location within Italy Location within Apulia
- Coordinates: 40°18′N 18°7′E
- Country: Italy
- Region: Apulia
- Province: Lecce (LE)

Government
  - Mayor: Raffaele Quarta

Area
  - Total: 8.2 km^{2} (3.2 sq mi)
- Elevation: 43 m (141 ft)

Population (30 November 2011)
  - Total: 3,629
  - Density: 440/km^{2} (1,100/sq mi)
- Demonym: Sampietrini or Sampietrani
- Time zone: UTC+1 (CET)
  - Summer (DST): UTC+2 (CEST)
- Postal code: 73010
- Dialing code: 0832
- Patron saint: St. Peter
- Saint day: 7 April
- Website: Official website

San Pietro in Lama (Salentino: Sampiètru ti l'ìrmici) is a town and comune in the province of Lecce in the Apulia region of south-east Italy.

Its Mother Church is a typical example of Leccese Baroque.
