= Giuggianello =

- Comune
- Comune di Giuggianello
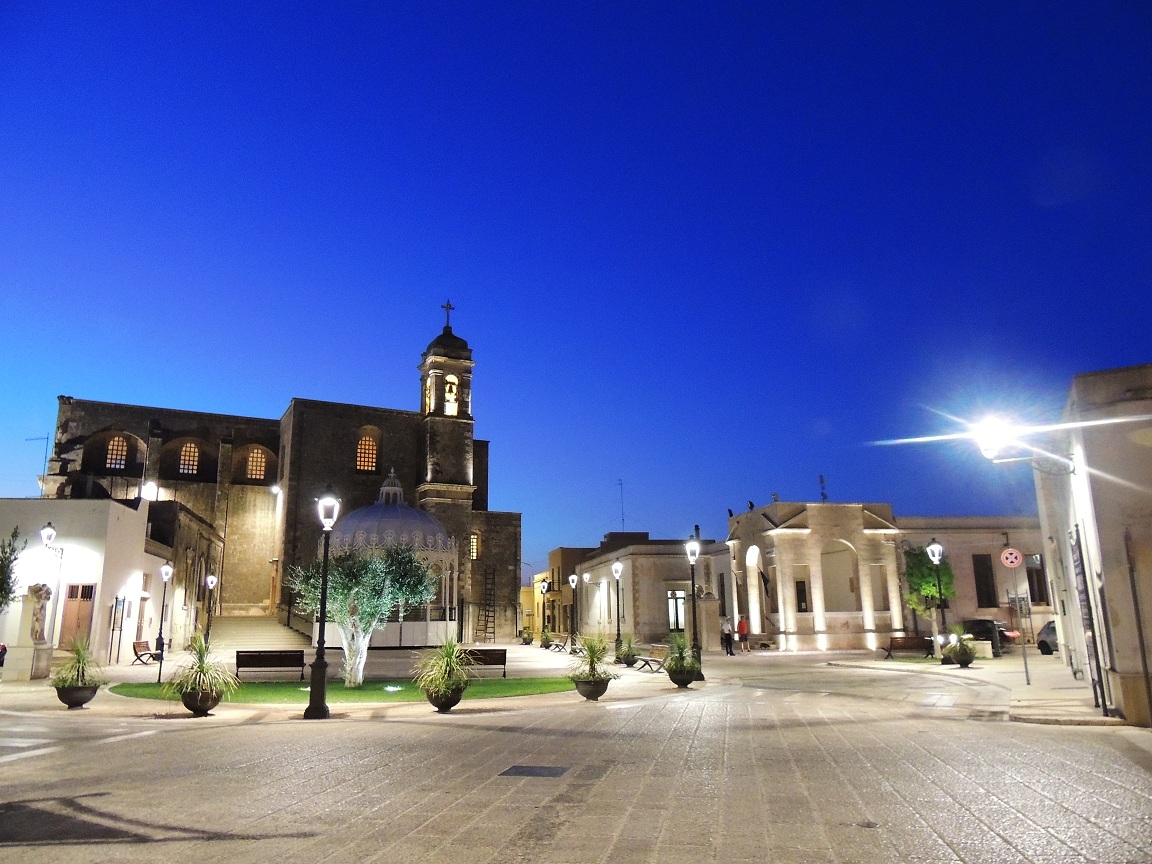

- Location within Italy Location within Apulia
- Coordinates: 40°6′N 18°22′E
- Country: Italy
- Region: Apulia
- Province: Lecce (LE)

Government
  - Mayor: Luca Benegiamo

Area
  - Total: 10.27 km^{2} (3.97 sq mi)
- Elevation: 79 m (259 ft)

Population (31 August 2017)
  - Total: 1,210
  - Density: 118/km^{2} (305/sq mi)
- Demonym: Giuggianellesi
- Time zone: UTC+1 (CET)
  - Summer (DST): UTC+2 (CEST)
- Postal code: 73030
- Dialing code: 0836
- ISTAT code: 075032
- Patron saint: St. Christopher
- Saint day: 25 July
- Website: Official website

Giuggianello (Salentino: Sciuvaneddhru) is a town and comune in the province of Lecce in the Apulia region of south-east Italy.
