= Patù =

Patù Páthos (Greek)
- Comune
- Comune di Patù
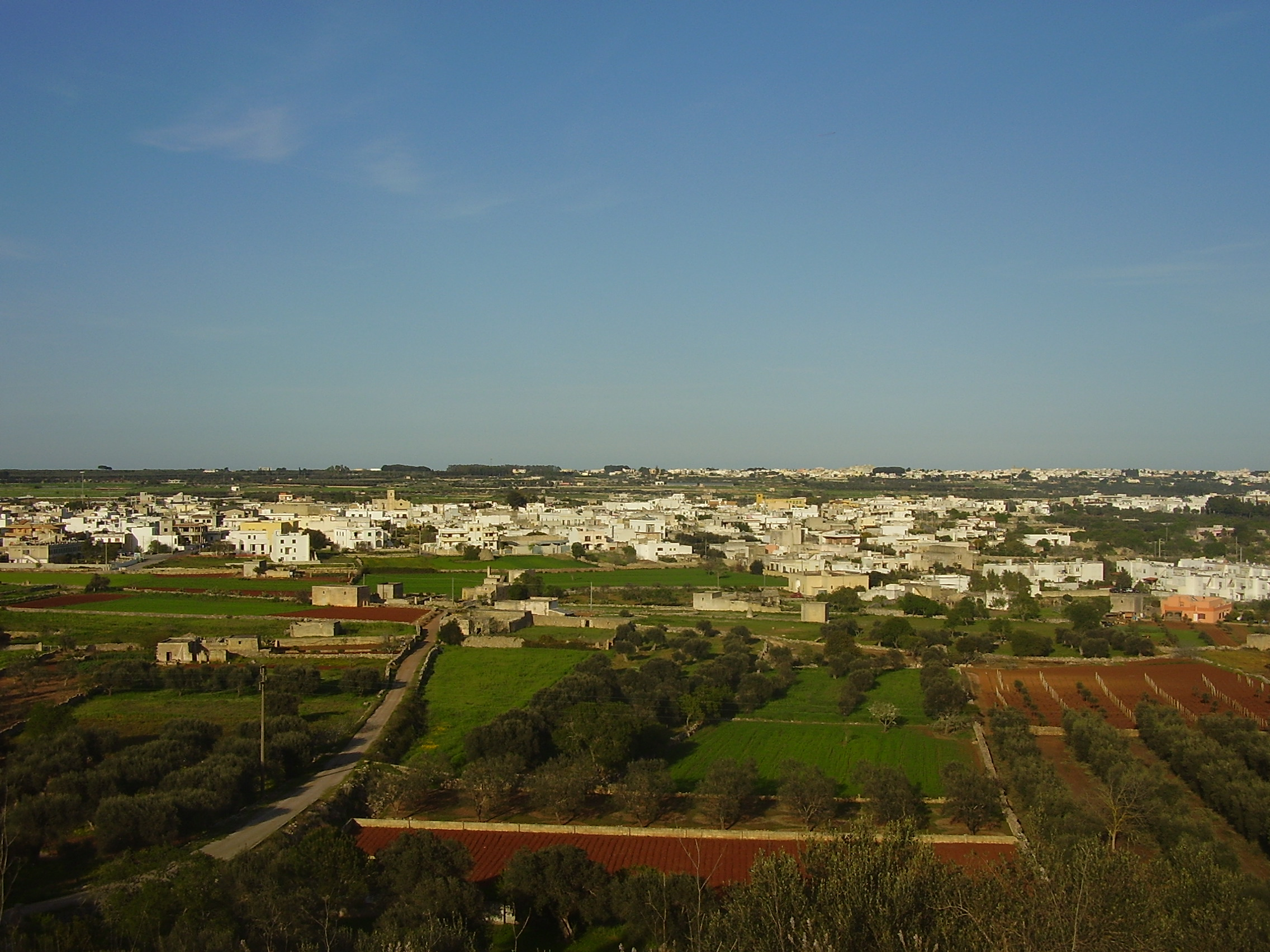

- Coat of arms

- Location within Italy Location within Apulia
- Coordinates: 39°51′N 18°20′E
- Country: Italy
- Region: Apulia
- Province: Lecce (LE)
- Frazioni: Felloniche, Marina di San Gregorio

Government
  - Mayor: Gabriele Abatarusso

Area
  - Total: 8.54 km^{2} (3.30 sq mi)
- Elevation: 124 m (407 ft)

Population (9 October 2011)
  - Total: 1,721
  - Density: 202/km^{2} (522/sq mi)
- Demonym: Patuensi
- Time zone: UTC+1 (CET)
  - Summer (DST): UTC+2 (CEST)
- Postal code: 73053
- Dialing code: 0833
- ISTAT code: 075060
- Patron saint: St. Michael Archangel
- Saint day: 24 June
- Website: Official website

Patù (Salentino: Pàtu) is a town and comune in the province of Lecce in the Apulia region of south-east Italy.

== Main sights ==
- Mother Church of St. Michael Archangel (1564), with a late Renaissance façade and a single nave. The entrance portal has the inscription Terribilis est locus iste ("Terrible Is This Place").
- Church of San Giovanni Battista, in Byzantine-Romanesque style (10th-11th centuries)
- Church of the Madonna di Vereto.
- Crypt of Sant'Elia, built by Basilian monks in the 8th-9th centuries.
- Torre del Fortino, the last surviving of the four towers of the destroyed castle.
- Archaeological site of Vereto, a Messapic ancient town
- Centopietre ("Hundred Stones"), a tomb-mausoleum of a knight who was killed by the Saracens before a battle fought nearby in 877.
