= Seclì =

Seclì Sikleion (Greek)
- Comune
- Comune di Seclì
- Coat of arms

- Location within Italy Location within Apulia
- Coordinates: 40°8′N 18°6′E
- Country: Italy
- Region: Apulia
- Province: Lecce (LE)
- Frazioni: Aradeo, Galatina, Galatone, Neviano

Area
  - Total: 8 km^{2} (3.1 sq mi)
- Elevation: 78 m (256 ft)

Population (March 2018)
  - Total: 1,427
  - Density: 180/km^{2} (460/sq mi)
- Demonym: Seclioti or Sichigliati
- Time zone: UTC+1 (CET)
  - Summer (DST): UTC+2 (CEST)
- Postal code: 73050
- Dialing code: 0836
- ISTAT code: 075074
- Patron saint: San Paolo Apostolo-Sant'Antonio da Padova
- Website: Official website

Seclì (Greek: Sikleion) is a town and comune in the Italian province of Lecce in the Apulia region of southeast Italy.
