= Surbo =

Surbo Greek: Syrvos
- Comune
- Comune di Surbo
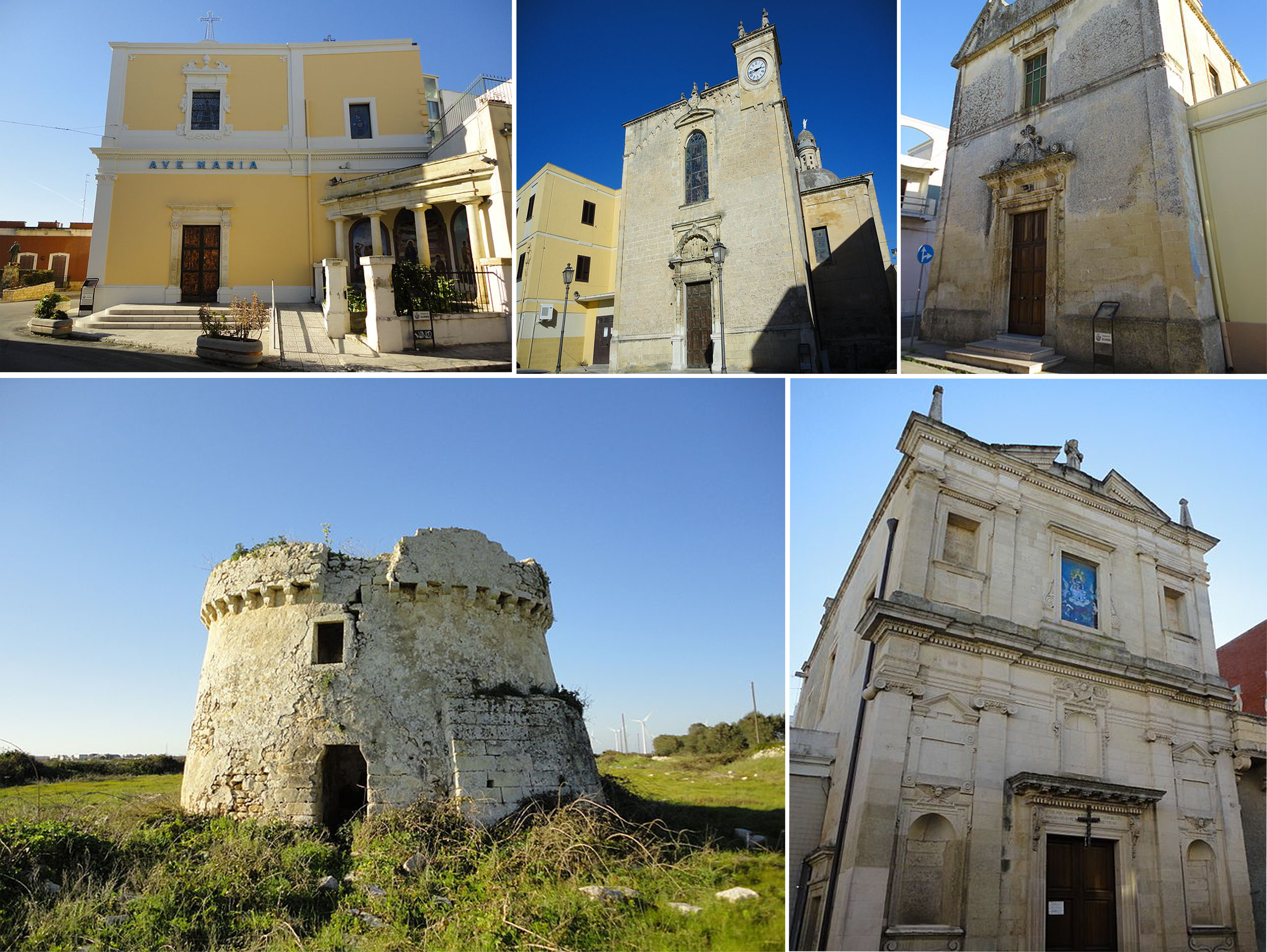
- Top left:Maria SS Loreto Church, Top middle:Santa Maria del Popolo Church, Top right:Saint Joseph Church, Bottom left:Torre del Cavallari (Cavallari Tower), Bottom right:Saint Vitus Church

- Coat of arms

- Location within Italy Location within Apulia
- Coordinates: 40°24′N 18°8′E
- Country: Italy
- Region: Apulia
- Province: Lecce (LE)
- Frazioni: Giorgilorio

Government
  - Mayor: Oronzo Trio

Area
  - Total: 20 km^{2} (7.7 sq mi)
- Elevation: 55 m (180 ft)

Population (31 July 2016)
  - Total: 15,190
  - Density: 760/km^{2} (2,000/sq mi)
- Demonym: Surbini
- Time zone: UTC+1 (CET)
  - Summer (DST): UTC+2 (CEST)
- Postal code: 73010
- Dialing code: 0832
- Patron saint: St. Orontius of Lecce
- Saint day: 2 October
- Website: Official website

Surbo (Greek: Syrvos) is a town and comune in the province of Lecce in the Apulia region of south-east Italy. It is an administrative enclave in the territory of the city of Lecce from whose center it is about 5 km away
