= San Cesario di Lecce =

- Comune
- Comune di San Cesario di Lecce
- Location within Italy Location within Apulia
- Coordinates: 40°18′N 18°10′E
- Country: Italy
- Region: Apulia
- Province: Lecce (LE)
- Frazioni: Cavallino, Lecce, Lequile, San Donato di Lecce

Area
  - Total: 7 km^{2} (2.7 sq mi)
- Elevation: 42 m (138 ft)

Population (November 2008)
  - Total: 8,154
  - Density: 1,200/km^{2} (3,000/sq mi)
- Demonym: Sancesariàni
- Time zone: UTC+1 (CET)
  - Summer (DST): UTC+2 (CEST)
- Postal code: 73016
- Dialing code: 0832
- ISTAT code: 075068
- Patron saint: San Cesario
- Website: Official website

San Cesario di Lecce is a town and comune in the Italian province of Lecce in the Apulia region of south-east Italy.
