= Lequile =

- Comune
- Comune di Lequile
- Coat of arms

- Location within Italy Location within Apulia
- Coordinates: 40°18′N 18°8′E
- Country: Italy
- Region: Apulia
- Province: Lecce (LE)
- Frazioni: Dragoni

Area
  - Total: 36 km^{2} (14 sq mi)
- Elevation: 38 m (125 ft)

Population (November 2008)
  - Total: 8,501
  - Density: 240/km^{2} (610/sq mi)
- Demonym: Lequilesi
- Time zone: UTC+1 (CET)
  - Summer (DST): UTC+2 (CEST)
- Postal code: 73010
- Dialing code: 0832
- ISTAT code: 075036
- Patron saint: St. Vitus
- Saint day: Fourth Sunday in June
- Website: Official website

Lequile (Salentino: Lècule) is a town and comune in the Italian province of Lecce in the Apulia region of south-east Italy.
