= Otranto =

Otranto Oṭṛàntu (Salentino) Derentó/Δερεντό (Greek)
- Comune
- Comune di Otranto
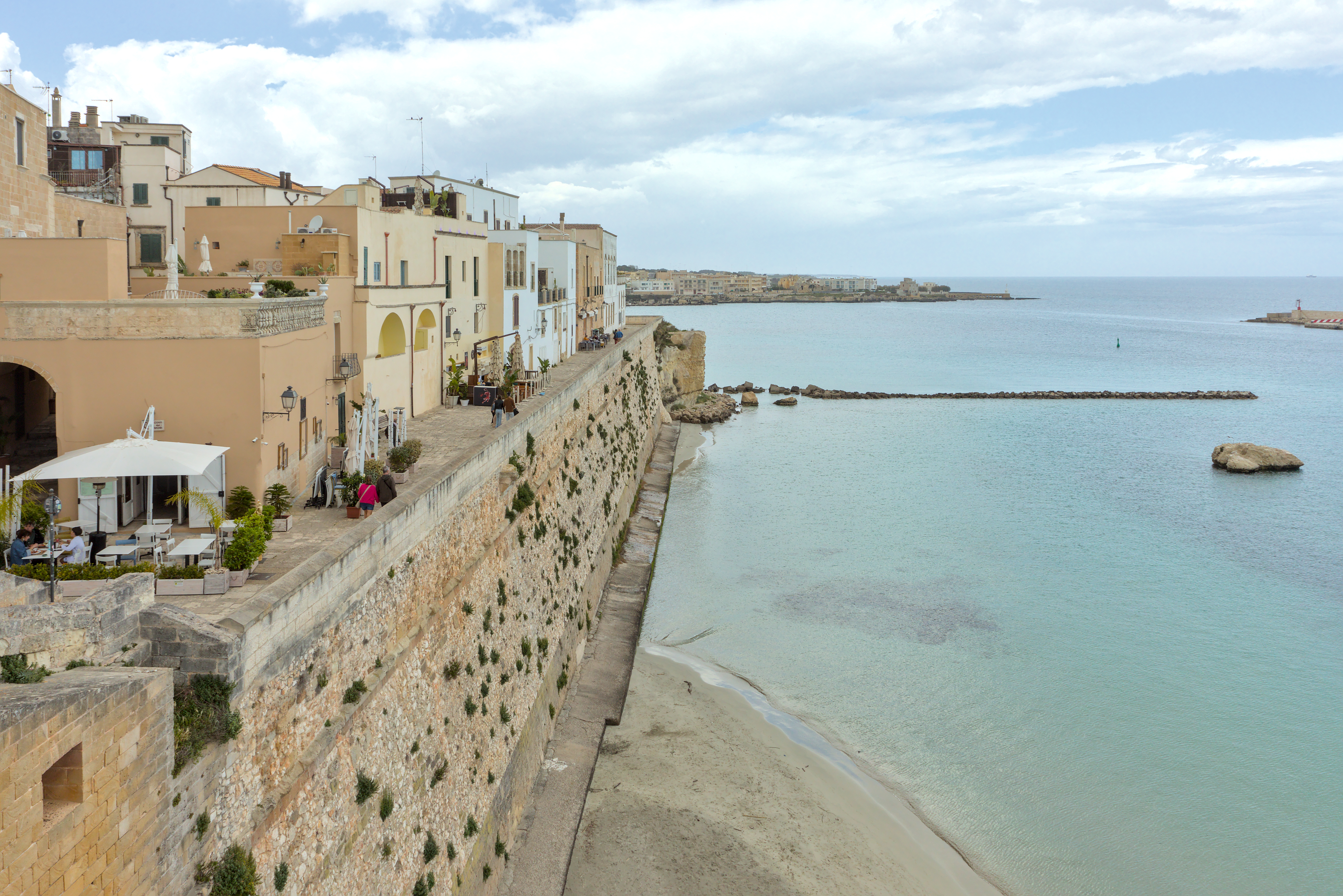
- Otranto seen from Torre Matta, a tower overlooking the harbour

- Coat of arms

- Location within Italy Location within Apulia
- Coordinates: 40°09′N 18°29′E
- Country: Italy
- Region: Apulia
- Province: Lecce (LE)
- Frazioni: Porto Badisco, Conca Spellucchia

Government
  - Mayor: Francesco Bruni

Area
  - Total: 77.2 km^{2} (29.8 sq mi)
- Elevation: 15 m (49 ft)

Population (31 December 2025)
  - Total: 5,587
  - Density: 72.4/km^{2} (187/sq mi)
- Demonym: Idruntini or Otrantini
- Time zone: UTC+1 (CET)
  - Summer (DST): UTC+2 (CEST)
- Postal code: 73028
- Dialing code: 0836
- ISTAT code: 075057
- Patron saint: Martyrs of Otranto
- Saint day: 14 August
- Website: Official website

Otranto (UK: /ɒˈtræntoʊ/,US: /oʊˈtrɑːntoʊ/, Italian: [ˈɔːtranto]; Salentino: Oṭṛàntu; Griko: Δερεντό, romanized: Derentò; Ancient Greek: Ὑδροῦς, romanized: Hudroûs; Latin: Hydruntum) is a coastal town, port and comune in the province of Lecce (Apulia, Italy), in a fertile region once famous for its breed of horses. It is one of I Borghi più belli d'Italia ("The most beautiful villages of Italy").

It is located on the east coast of the Salento peninsula. The Strait of Otranto, to which the city gives its name, connects the Adriatic Sea with the Ionian Sea and separates Italy from Albania. The harbour is small and has little trade.

The lighthouse Faro della Palascìa, at approximately five kilometres (three miles) southeast of Otranto, marks the most easterly point of the Italian mainland.

About 50 kilometres (31 mi) south lies the promontory of Santa Maria di Leuca (so called since ancient times from its white cliffs, leukos being Greek for white), the southeastern extremity of Italy, the ancient Promontorium Iapygium or Sallentinum. The district between this promontory and Otranto is densely populated and very fertile.

The area that lies between Otranto and Santa Maria di Leuca is part of the Regional Natural Coastal Park of "Costa Otranto - Santa Maria di Leuca e Bosco di Tricase" wanted by the Apulia Region in 2008. This territory has numerous natural and historical attractions such as Ciolo, which is a rocky cove.

== History ==
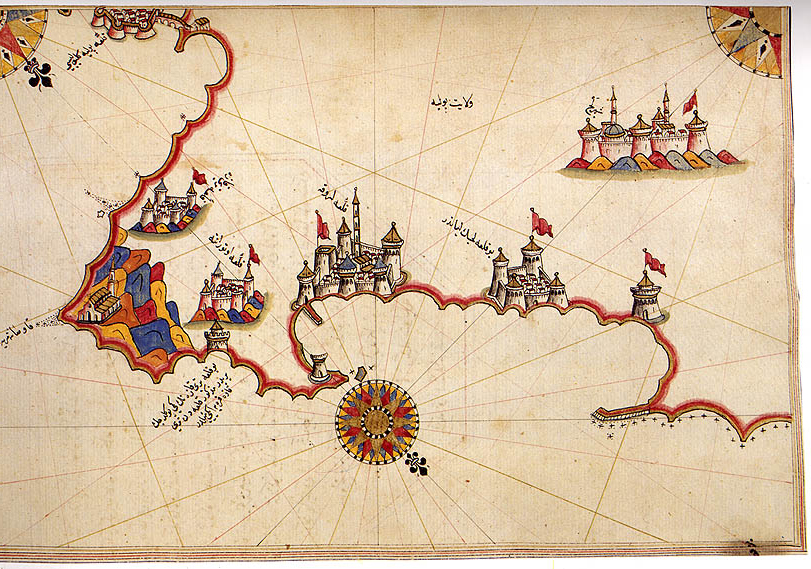
Historic map of Otranto by Piri Reis

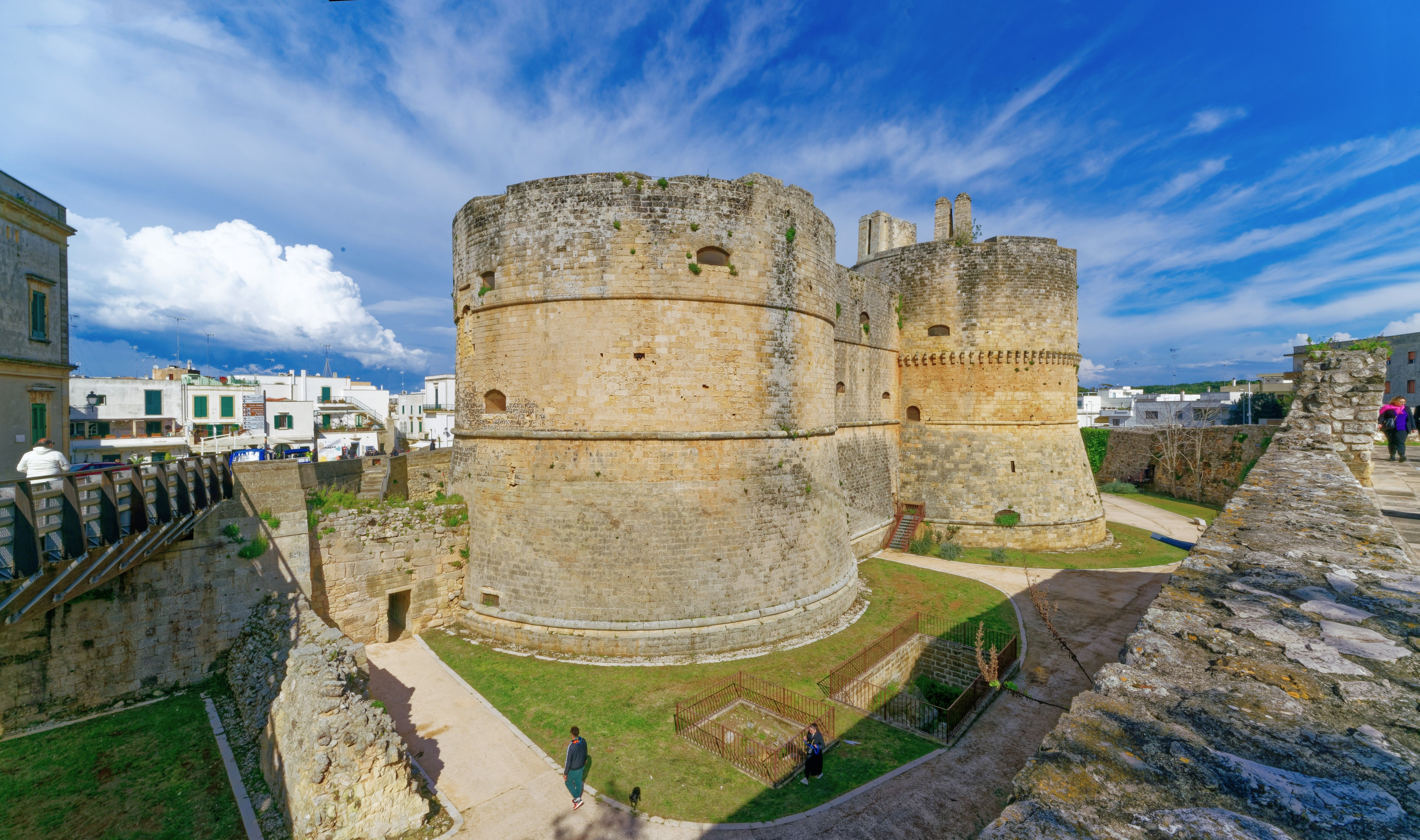
The fortress

Otranto occupies the site of the ancient Greek city of Magna Graecia Hydrus (Greek Ὑδροῦς, stem Ὑδρουντ-) or Hydruntum (Latin), also known as Hydrunton, Hydronton, or Hydruntu. Otranto was a town of Messapian origin which sided against Rome in the wars of Pyrrhus and of Hannibal.

In Roman times it was a city. As it is the nearest port to the eastern coast of the Adriatic Sea, it was perhaps more important than Brundisium (present Brindisi), under the Roman emperors as a point of embarkation for the East, as the distance to Apollonia (in present Albania) was less than from Brundisium.

In the 8th century, it was for some time in the possession of duke Arechis II of Benevento.

On 17 August 928, the city was sacked by a Fatimid fleet under Sabir al-Fata. Its inhabitants were carried to North Africa as slaves. It remained in the hands of the Byzantine emperors until it was among the last cities of Apulia to surrender to the Norman Robert Guiscard in 1068. It then became part of the Principality of Taranto. In the Middle Ages, the Jews had a school there.

=== Ottoman conquest ===
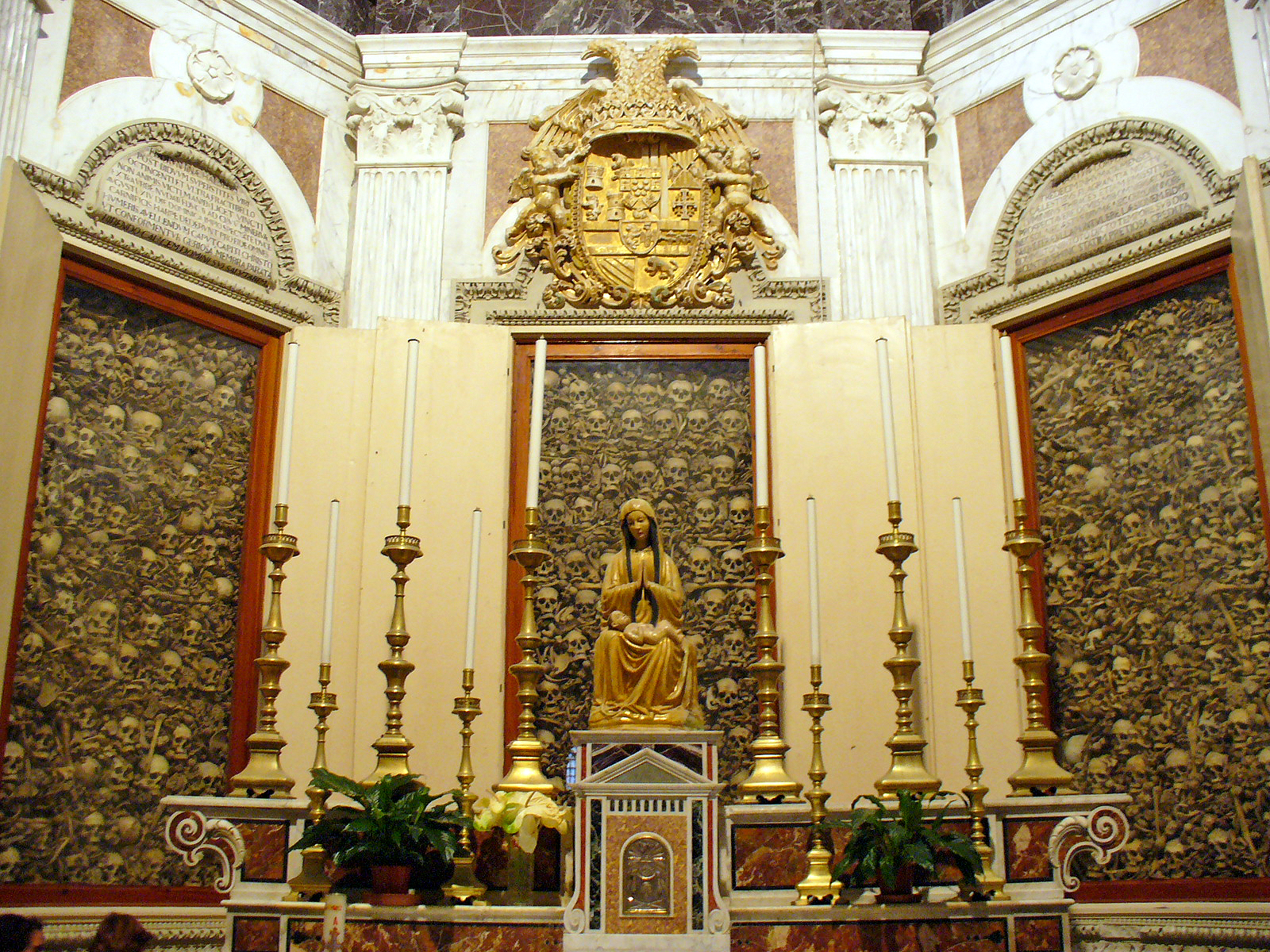
Skulls of "Martyrs of Otranto" on display in Otranto cathedral

In 1480, Sultan Mehmed II sent an Ottoman fleet to invade Rome under the command of Gedik Ahmed Pasha. The force reached the shores of Apulia on 28 July 1480, and the city was captured in two weeks on 11 August 1480. The Muslim invaders had the commander of the defending force executed by being sawn in half and 800 residents were beheaded after refusing to convert to Islam. They were canonised by Pope Francis on 12 May 2013. Archbishop Stefano Pendinelli was also martyred.

Between August and September 1480, the Italian and European kingdoms failed to help King Ferdinand of Naples except for his cousin Ferdinand the Catholic of Spain, the Kingdom of Sicily and later the Republic of Genoa. In 1481, the Pope, in panic, called for a crusade to be led by King Ferdinand of Naples and was joined by troops of Hungarian king Matthias Corvinus. The Ottomans controlled the city for 13 months. Mehmed II died on his way to capture the rest of Italy. His successor, Sultan Bayezid II, ordered Gedik Ahmed Pasha to be hanged. On 11 September 1481, the Ottomans abandoned the city.

In 1537, the famous Ottoman corsair and admiral Barbarossa recaptured Otranto and the Fortress of Castro, but the Ottomans were again repulsed from the city and from the rest of Apulia.

=== Napoleonic Wars ===
In 1804, the city was obliged to harbour a French garrison that was established there to watch the movements of the English fleet. Under the French name of Otrante it was created a duché grand-fief de l'Empire in the Napoleonic kingdom of Naples for Joseph Fouché, Napoleon's minister of Police (1809). The family used the title of duc d'Otrante after Joseph Fouché's death.

=== World War I ===
During WWI the allied Italian-French-British Fleet organized the Otranto Barrage to control the Austro-Hungarian Fleet in the Adriatic Sea. The Austro-Hungarian Fleet led by captain Miklós Horthy attacked the Barrage (13–15 May 1917) breaking it and sinking some British drifters (Battle of the Strait of Otranto (1917)).

=== World War II ===
During WWII the British fleet raided the Otranto Channel (11–12 November 1940) as a diversionary manoeuvre (Battle of the Strait of Otranto (1940) from the contemporary main attack on Taranto (Battle of Taranto).

== Geography ==
=== Climate ===
Otranto experiences a humid subtropical climate (Köppen climate classification Cfa) with long, hot summers and short, cool winters.

Climate data for Otranto
Month	Jan	Feb	Mar	Apr	May	Jun	Jul	Aug	Sep	Oct	Nov	Dec	Year
Mean daily maximum °C (°F)	13.0 (55.4)	13.5 (56.3)	15.7 (60.3)	18.9 (66.0)	24.4 (75.9)	27.0 (80.6)	28.7 (83.7)	28.5 (83.3)	25.8 (78.4)	22.3 (72.1)	17.3 (63.1)	14.0 (57.2)	20.8 (69.4)
Mean daily minimum °C (°F)	7.2 (45.0)	8.2 (46.8)	9.6 (49.3)	10.0 (50.0)	12.1 (53.8)	15.9 (60.6)	21.2 (70.2)	21.1 (70.0)	16.0 (60.8)	12.7 (54.9)	10.3 (50.5)	8.3 (46.9)	12.7 (54.9)
Average precipitation mm (inches)	52 (2.0)	60 (2.4)	81 (3.2)	83.3 (3.28)	83.6 (3.29)	110.7 (4.36)	85.8 (3.38)	67.5 (2.66)	114.6 (4.51)	100.2 (3.94)	80.7 (3.18)	53.3 (2.10)	972.2 (38.28)
Average precipitation days	6.7	7.1	8.2	8.1	6.9	7.3	5.8	5.1	7.7	7.5	7.2	6.6	84.2
Source: Italian Ministry of Defence

== Main sights ==
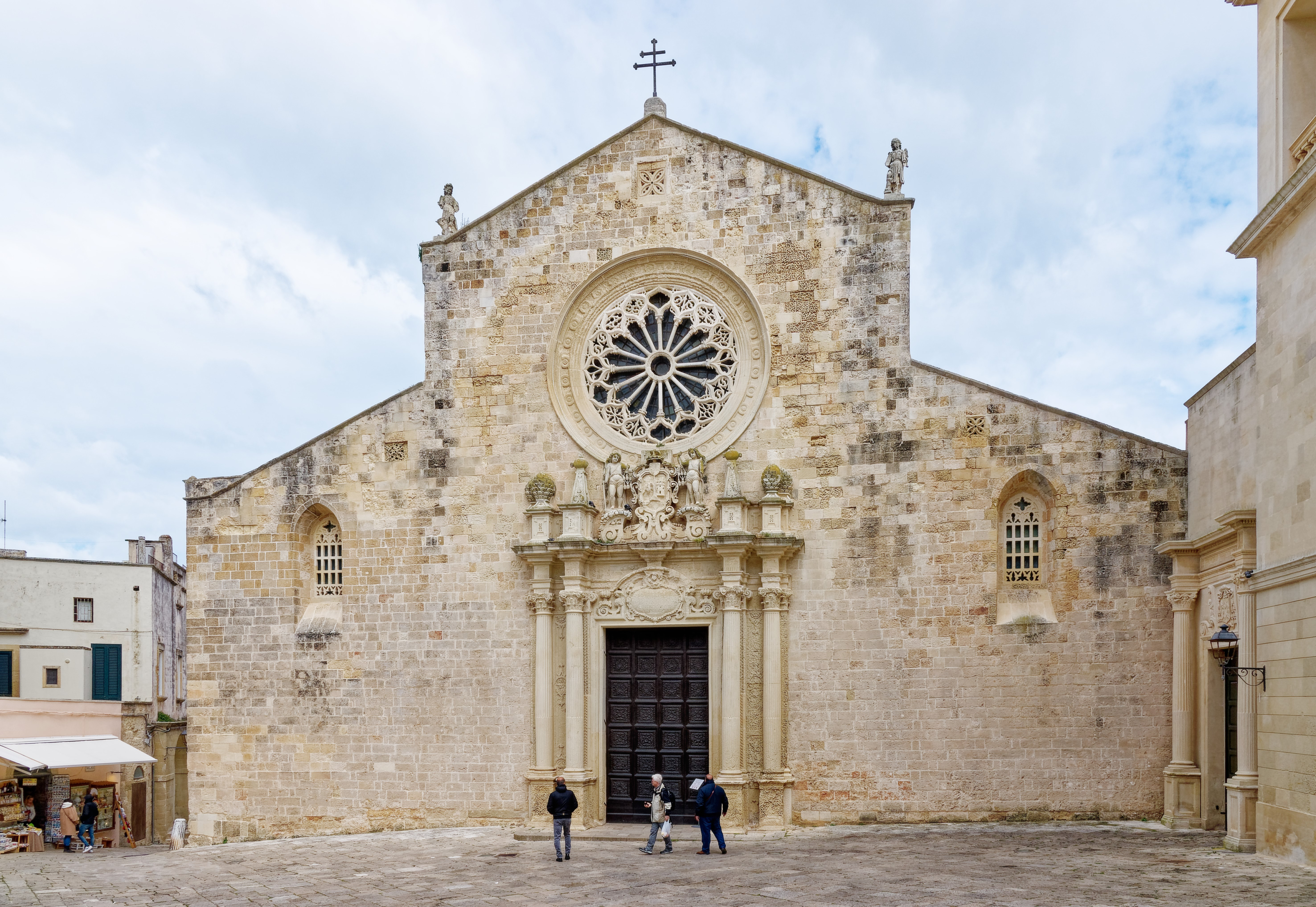
The Cathedral of Otranto

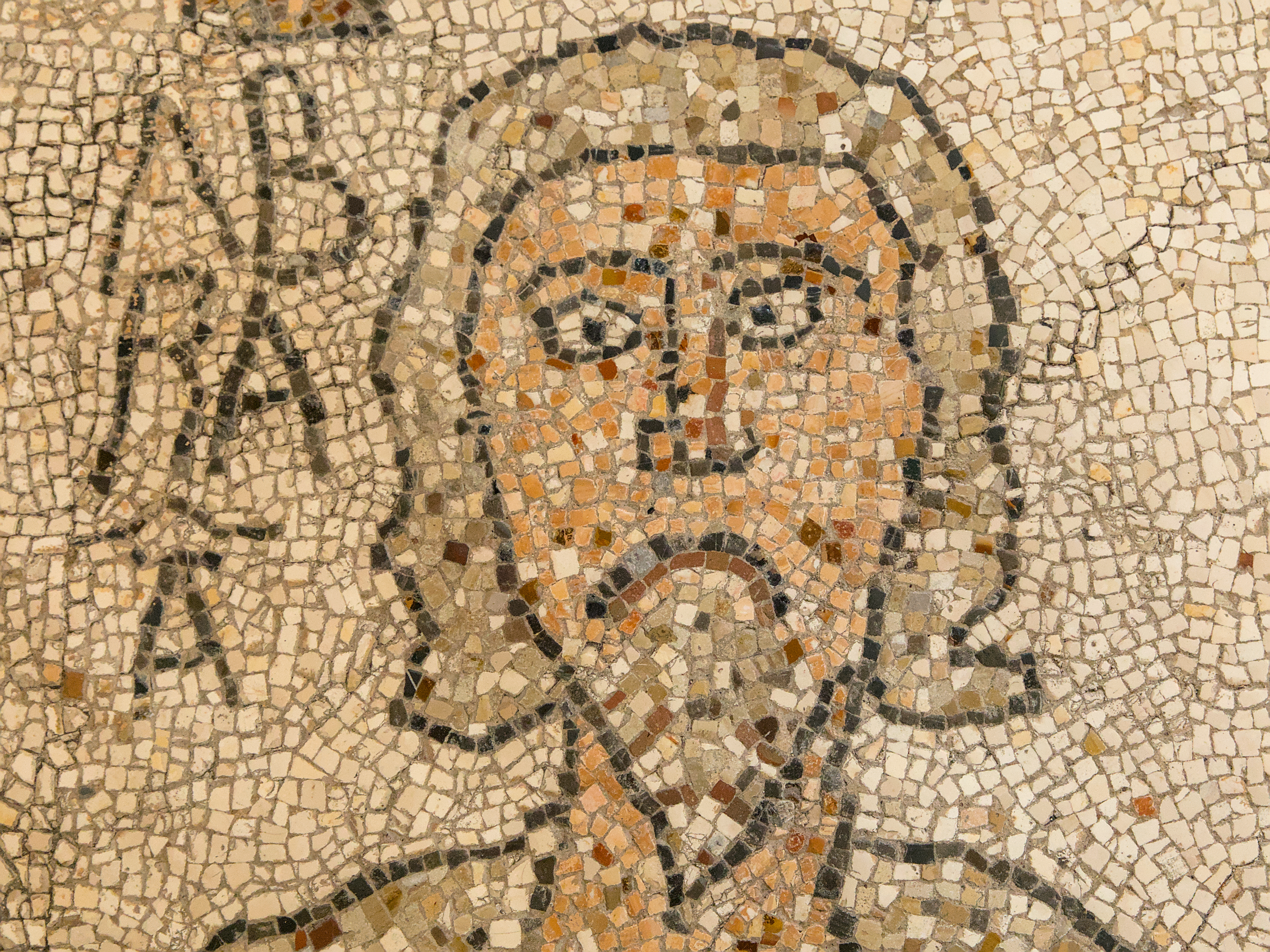
Head of Abraham, detail of the mosaic covering most of the cathedral's floor.

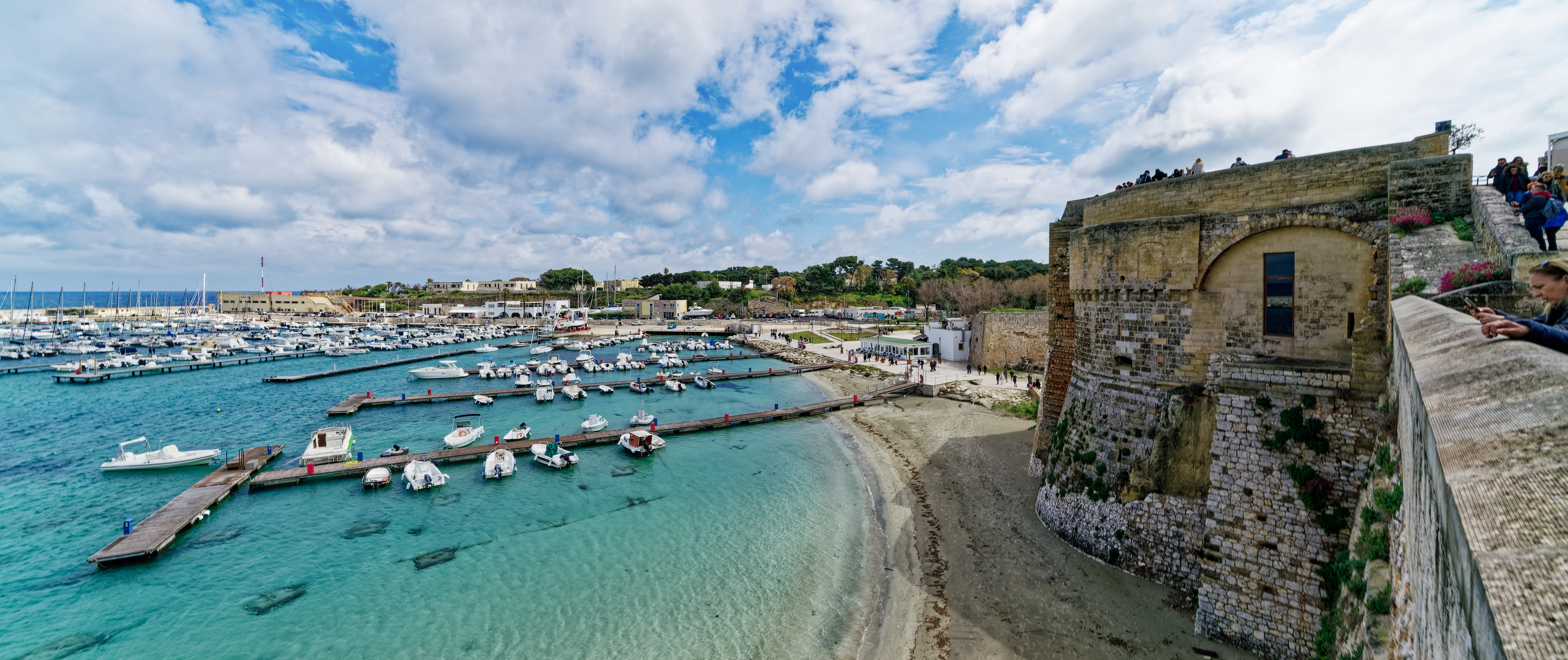
The harbor of Otranto seen from the historic center

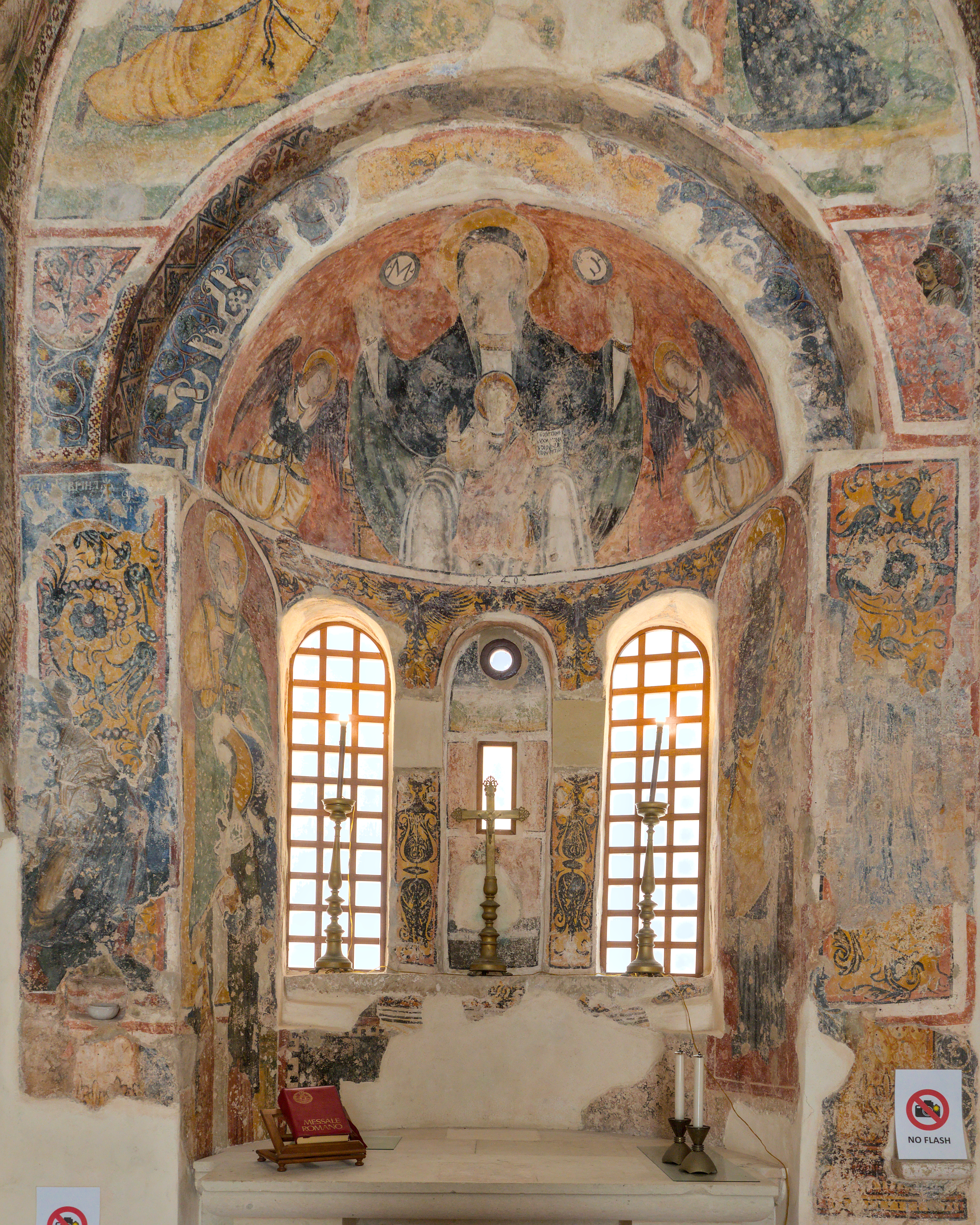
Choir of the church of San Pietro.

Otranto main sights include:

- The Castello Aragonese (Castle), reinforced by Emperor Frederick II and rebuilt by Alphonso II of Naples in 1485–98. It has an irregular plan with five sides, with a moat running along the entire perimeter. In origin it had a single entrance, reachable through a draw-bridge. Towers include three cylindrical ones and a bastion called Punta di Diamante ("Diamond's Head"). The entrance sports the coat of arms of Emperor Charles V.
- The Cathedral, consecrated in 1088, a work of Count Roger I adorned later (about 1163), by Bishop Jonathas, with a mosaic floor; it has a rose window and side portal of 1481. The interior, a basilica with nave and two aisles, contains columns said to come from a temple of Minerva and a fine mosaic pavement of 1166, with interesting representations of the months, Old Testament subjects and others. Bones and relics of the Martyrs of Otranto, who perished in the 15th-century siege surround the high altar. The church has a crypt supported by 42 marble columns. The same Count Roger also founded a Basilian monastery here, which, under Abbot Nicetas, became a place of study; its library was nearly all bought by Bessarion.
- The church of San Pietro, with Byzantine frescoes.
- The catacombs of Torre Pinta.
- Idro, a small river which the toponym Otranto stems from.

== Culture ==
Otranto is the setting of Horace Walpole's book The Castle of Otranto, which is generally held to be the first Gothic novel. Walpole had chosen the town from a map of the Kingdom of Naples because the name was "well-sounding"; he was not aware that Otranto had a castle until 1786, some twenty-two years after the novel was first published under a pseudonym. The principal model for the castle was his villa in Strawberry Hill, London.

Otranto is also mentioned in Bram Stoker's novel The Lady of the Shroud.

== International relations ==
=== Twin towns – Sister cities ===
Otranto is twinned with:

- Sarandë, Albania

== See also ==
- Bishopric of Otranto
- Martyrs of Otranto
- Otranto Tragedy
- Ottoman invasion of Otranto

== Sources ==
- Heraldica.org- Napoleonic
- GigaCatholic
