= Morciano di Leuca =

- Comune
- Comune di Morciano di Leuca
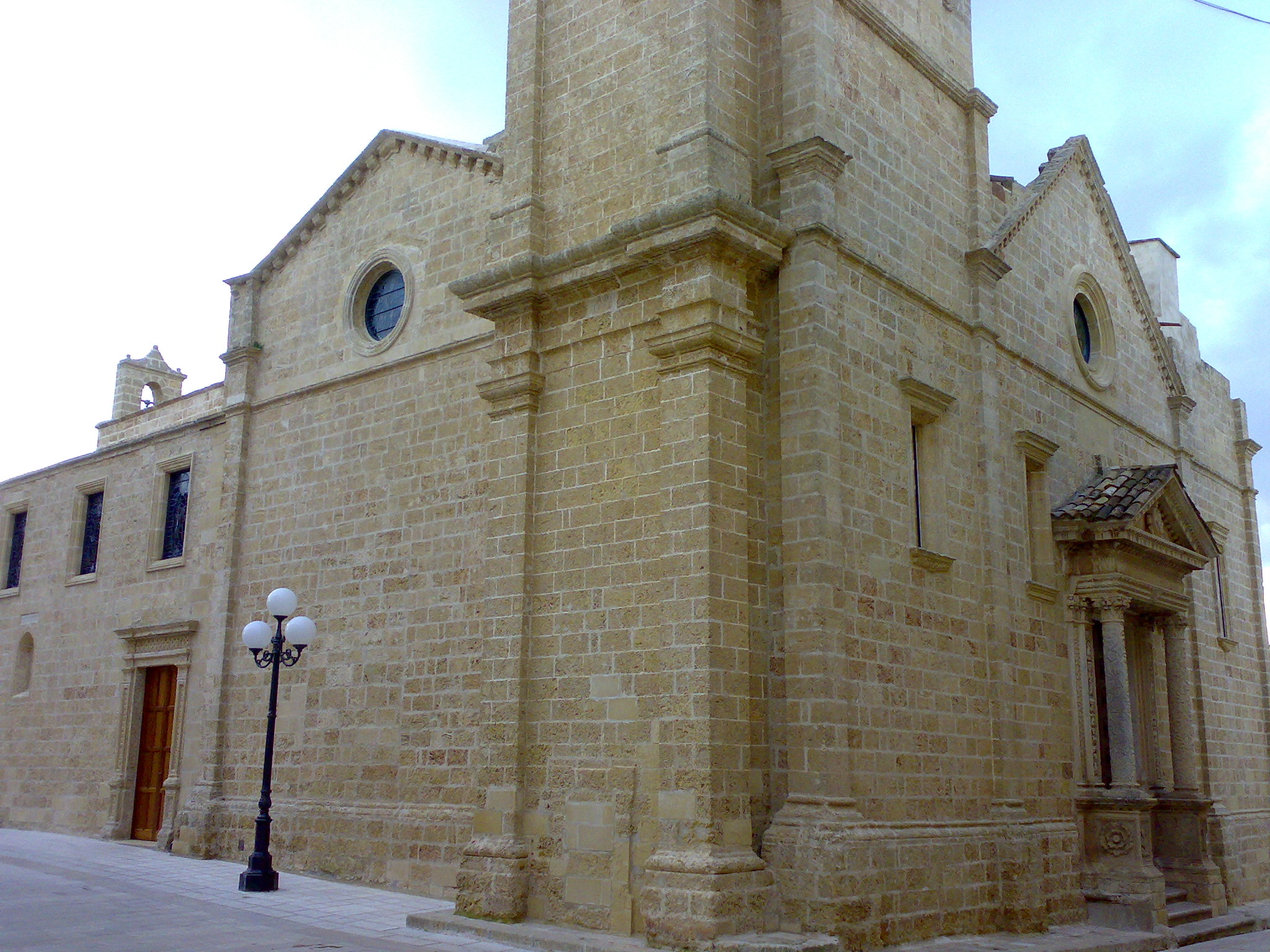
- Mother Church of Morciano di Leuca

- Coat of arms

- Location of Morciano di Leuca in Italy Morciano di Leuca (Apulia)
- Coordinates: 39°51′N 18°19′E
- Country: Italy
- Region: Apulia
- Province: Lecce (LE)
- Frazioni: Barbarano del Capo, Marina di Torre Vado

Government
  - Mayor: Lorenzo Ricchiuti

Area
  - Total: 13.57 km^{2} (5.24 sq mi)
- Elevation: 130 m (430 ft)

Population (31 August 2020)
  - Total: 3,121
  - Density: 230.0/km^{2} (595.7/sq mi)
- Demonym: Morcianesi
- Time zone: UTC+1 (CET)
  - Summer (DST): UTC+2 (CEST)
- Postal code: 73040
- Dialing code: 0833
- ISTAT code: 075050
- Patron saint: Saint John the Merciful
- Saint day: 23 January
- Website: Official website

Morciano di Leuca is a town and comune of 3,121 inhabitants in the province of Lecce, in the Apulia region of south-east Italy.

== History ==
The origins of Morciano di Leuca probably go back to the 9th century AD, with the destruction of the city by the Saracens. In 1190 king Tancred of Sicily gave Sinibaldo Sambiasi the fief of Morciano, which remained under his family until the 13th century. Later it was acquired by other barons, including Walter VI of Brienne (1335).

== Main sights ==
- Castle, built by order of Walter VI of Brienne in the early 14th century
- Mother Church of San Giovanni Elemosiniere (16th century)
- Church of the Carmine (c. 1486)
- Coastal watchtower of Torre Vado (16th century)
