= Province of Lecce =

Province of Italy

Coordinates: 40°21′7.24″N 18°10′8.9″E

Province of Lecce Provincia di Lecce (Italian) Provincia te Lècce (Salentino)
- Province
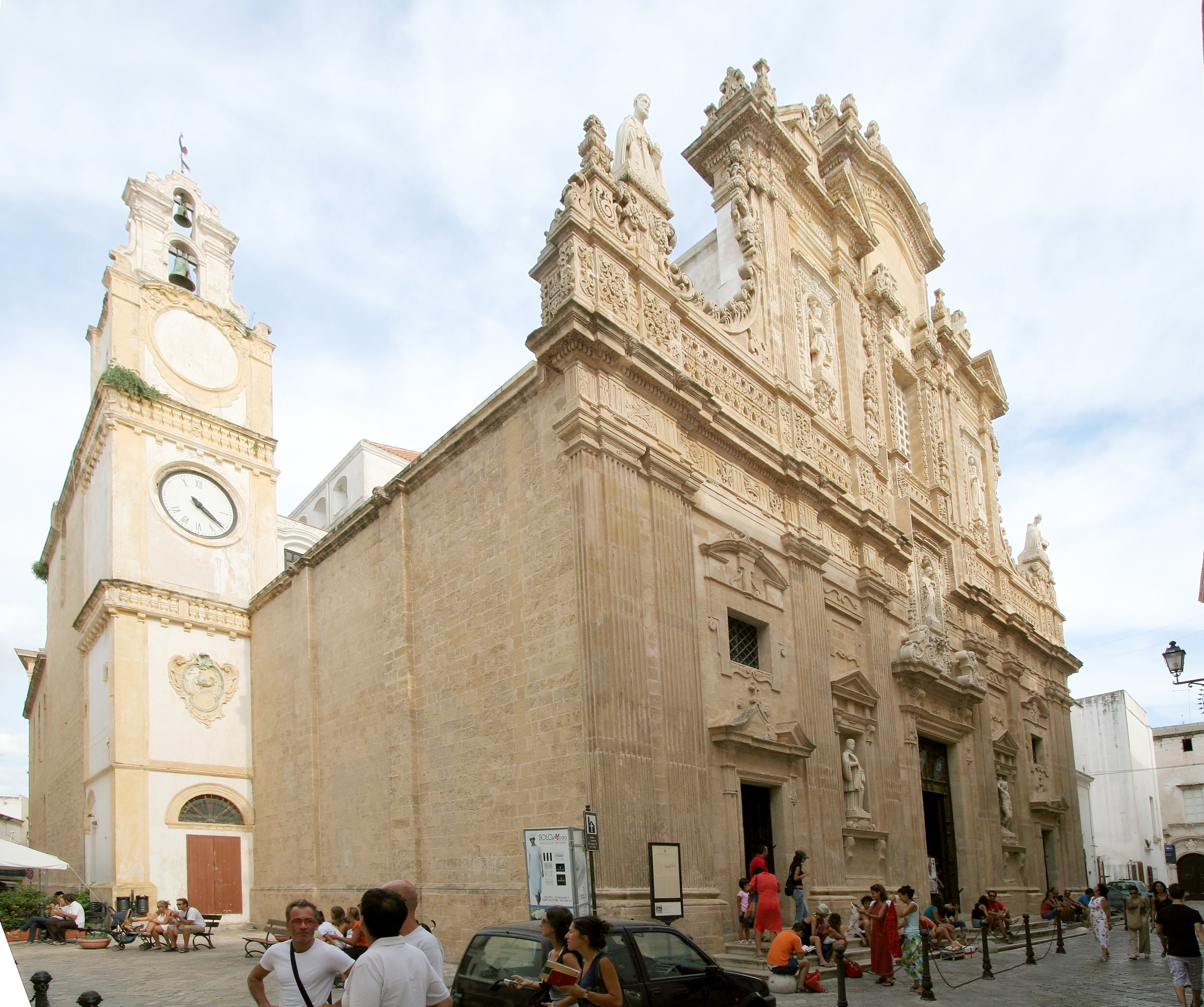
- The Cathedral of Gallipoli

- Flag Coat of arms

- Location of the Province of Lecce in Italy
- Country: Italy
- Region: Apulia
- Capital(s): Lecce
- Municipalities: 97

Government
  - President: Fabio Tarantino

Area
  - Total: 2,799.07 km^{2} (1,080.73 sq mi)

Population (2026)
  - Total: 761,927
  - Density: 272.207/km^{2} (705.013/sq mi)

GDP
  - Total: €12.715 billion (2015)
  - Per capita: €15,789 (2015)
- Time zone: UTC+1 (CET)
  - Summer (DST): UTC+2 (CEST)
- Postal code: 73001-73100
- Telephone prefix: 0832, 0833, 0836
- Vehicle registration: LE
- ISTAT code: 075

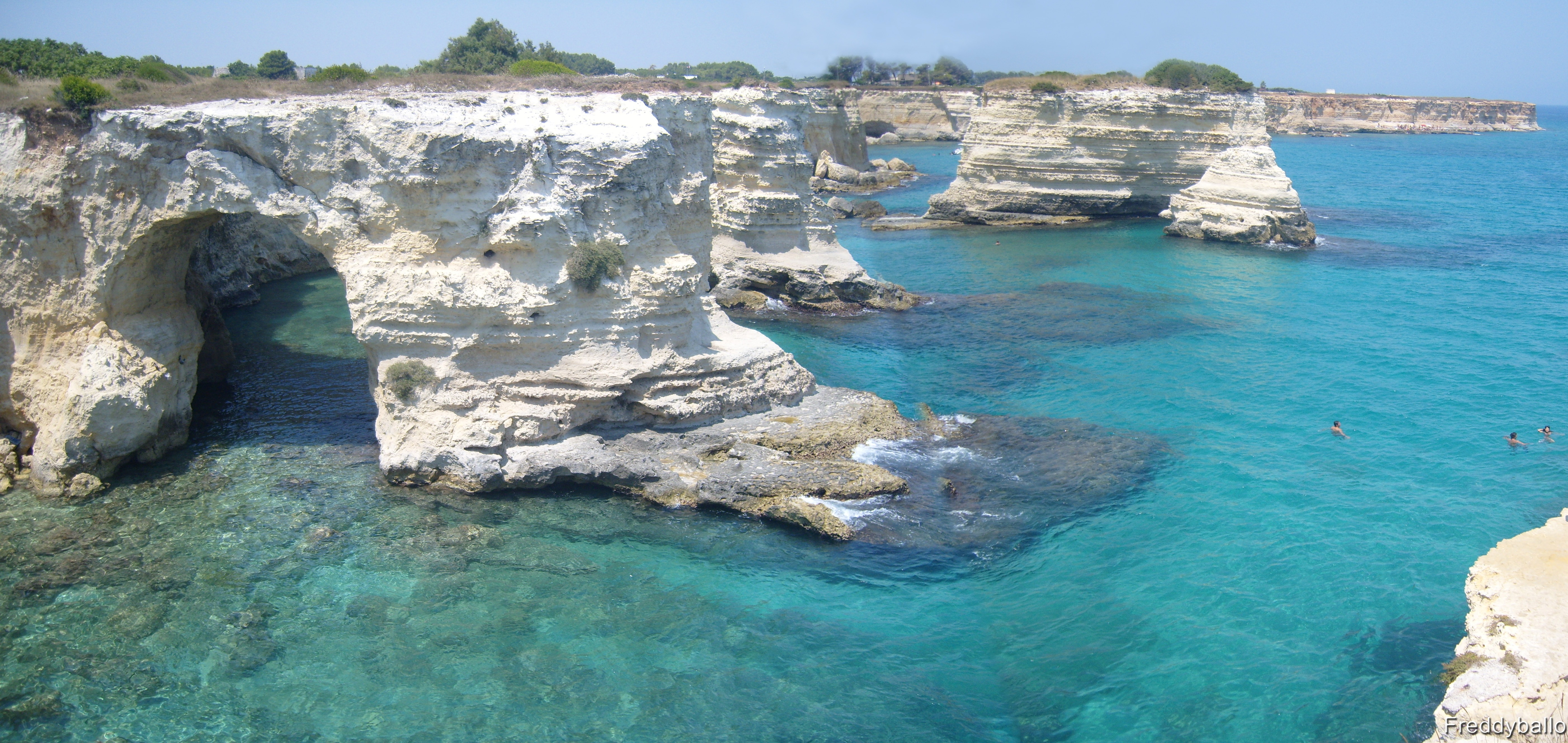
Torre Sant'Andrea

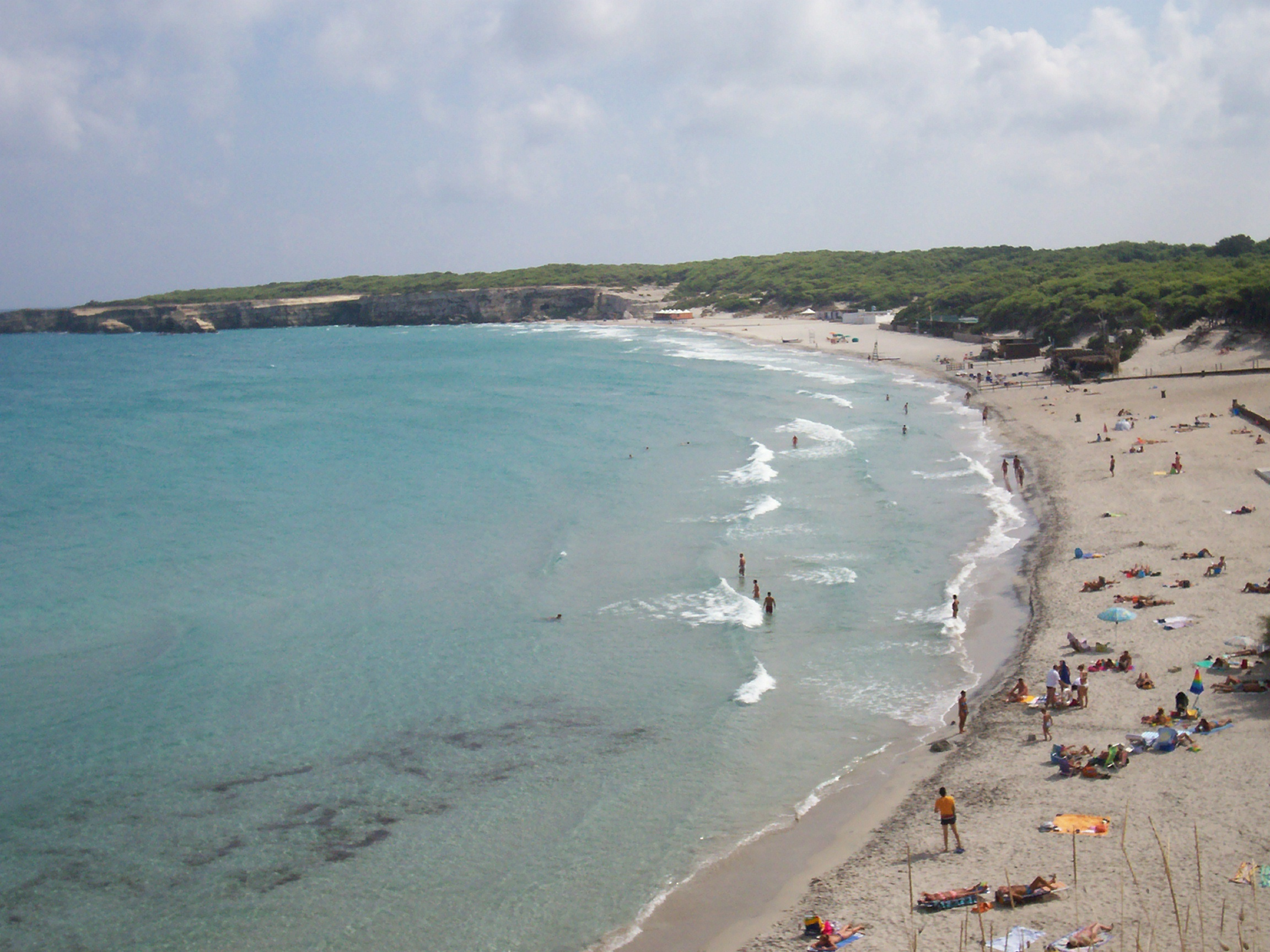
Torre dell'Orso beach

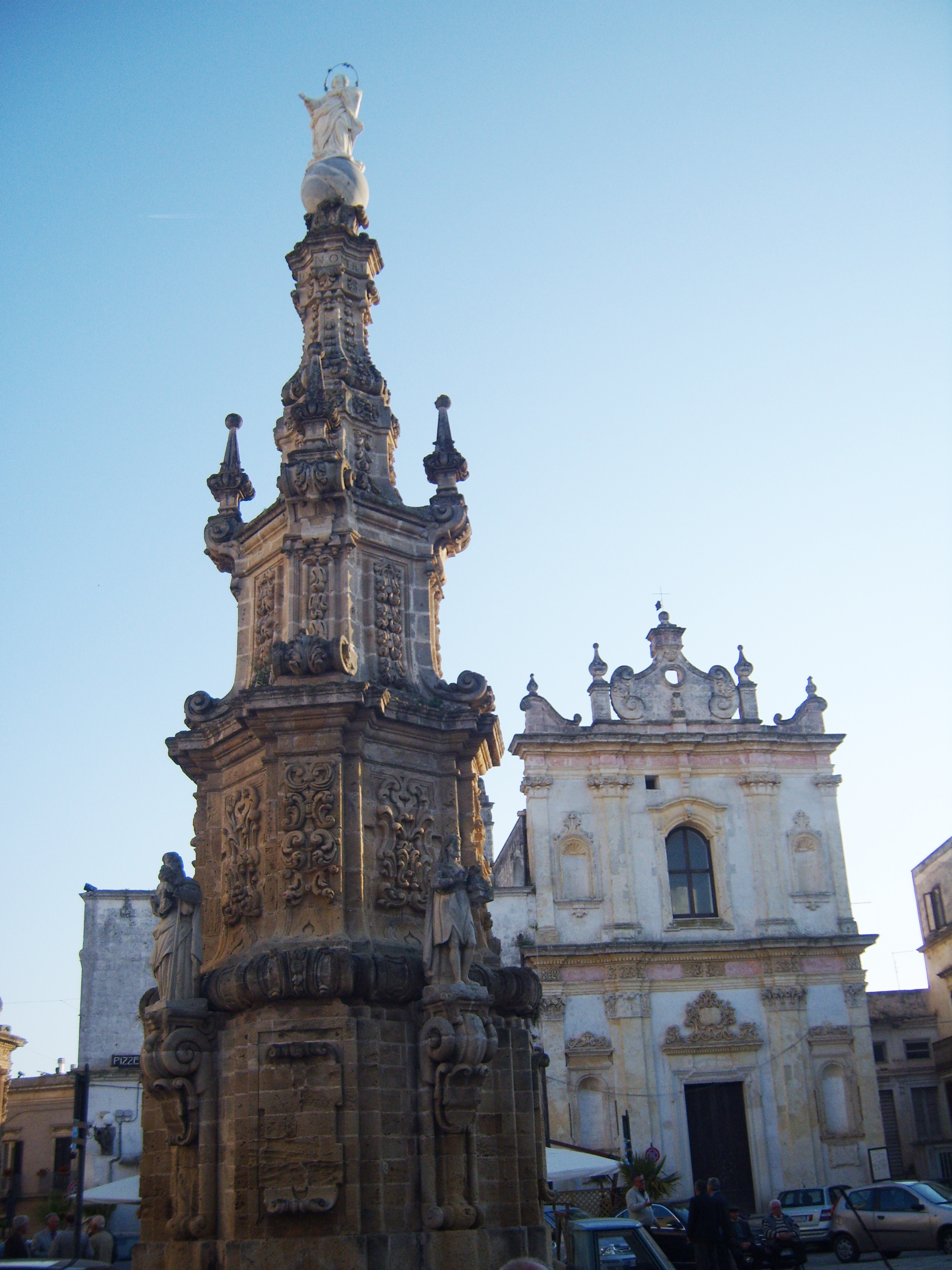
Salandra square in Nardò

The province of Lecce (Italian: provincia di Lecce; Salentino: provincia te Lècce) is a province in the region of Apulia in southern Italy. Its capital is the city of Lecce. Located on the Salento peninsula, the province is called the "Heel of Italy". Located on the Salento peninsula,

The province has a population of 761,927 in an area of 2,799.07 square kilometres (1,080.73 mi^{2}) across its 97 municipalities. It is the second most-populous province in Apulia and the 22nd most populous province in Italy.

It is surrounded by the provinces Taranto and Brindisi in the northwest, the Ionian Sea in the west, and the Adriatic Sea in the east. This location has established it as a popular tourist destination. It has been ruled by the Romans, Byzantine Greeks, Carolingians, Lombards, and Normans. The important towns are Lecce, Gallipoli, Nardò, Maglie, and Otranto. Its important agricultural products are wheat and corn. Lecce stone extracted from the province has been used to decorate several historical monuments and is widely used for interior decoration.

== History ==
The province of Lecce has its origins in the medieval Giustizierato, known then as the province of Terra d'Otranto. During the medieval era, Muslim slaves were transported from the province's ports and the practice of keeping slaves was common. Since the eleventh century the Terra d'Otranto included the territories of the provinces of Lecce, Taranto and Brindisi, with the exception of Fasano and Cisternino. During this time Lecce was severely affected by poverty despite the production of olive oil. People from Lecce migrated to the Province of Bari, where they worked in the wine industry. Up to 1663, the province of Terra d'Otranto also included the territory of Matera (Basilicata). Its first capital was Otranto but in the Norman period (twelfth century), Lecce city was made the capital. After the unification of Italy, the name Terra d'Otranto was changed to province of Lecce and its territory was divided into the four districts; Lecce, Gallipoli, Brindisi and Taranto. Its break-up began in 1923 when the district of Taranto was transformed into the new province of the Ionian.

After the first world war economic conditions worsened and unemployment peaked. These factors, coupled with the negligence of the weak government, prompted farm workers to revolt against their employers. Farm owners were captured and paraded in public places.

== Municipalities ==
The province has 97 municipalities:

- Alessano
- Alezio
- Alliste
- Andrano
- Aradeo
- Arnesano
- Bagnolo del Salento
- Botrugno
- Calimera
- Campi Salentina
- Cannole
- Caprarica di Lecce
- Carmiano
- Carpignano Salentino
- Casarano
- Castri di Lecce
- Castrignano de' Greci
- Castrignano del Capo
- Castro
- Cavallino
- Collepasso
- Copertino
- Corigliano d'Otranto
- Corsano
- Cursi
- Cutrofiano
- Diso
- Gagliano del Capo
- Galatina
- Galatone
- Gallipoli
- Giuggianello
- Giurdignano
- Guagnano
- Lecce
- Lequile
- Leverano
- Lizzanello
- Maglie
- Martano
- Martignano
- Matino
- Melendugno
- Melissano
- Melpignano
- Miggiano
- Minervino di Lecce
- Monteroni di Lecce
- Montesano Salentino
- Morciano di Leuca
- Muro Leccese
- Nardò
- Neviano
- Nociglia
- Novoli
- Ortelle
- Otranto
- Palmariggi
- Parabita
- Patù
- Poggiardo
- Porto Cesareo
- Presicce-Acquarica
- Racale
- Ruffano
- Salice Salentino
- Salve
- San Cassiano
- San Cesario di Lecce
- San Donato di Lecce
- San Pietro in Lama
- Sanarica
- Sannicola
- Santa Cesarea Terme
- Scorrano
- Seclì
- Sogliano Cavour
- Soleto
- Specchia
- Spongano
- Squinzano
- Sternatia
- Supersano
- Surano
- Surbo
- Taurisano
- Taviano
- Tiggiano
- Trepuzzi
- Tricase
- Tuglie
- Ugento
- Uggiano La Chiesa
- Veglie
- Vernole
- Zollino

== Demographics ==
Historical population
Year	Pop.	±%
1861	225,678	—
1871	250,520	+11.0%
1881	278,915	+11.3%
1901	348,530	+25.0%
1911	389,476	+11.7%
1921	427,166	+9.7%
1931	489,202	+14.5%
1936	526,553	+7.6%
1951	623,905	+18.5%
1961	678,338	+8.7%
1971	696,503	+2.7%
1981	762,017	+9.4%
1991	803,977	+5.5%
2001	787,825	−2.0%
2011	802,018	+1.8%
2021	775,348	−3.3%
Source: ISTAT

As of 2026, the population is 761,927, of which 48.3% are male, and 51.7% are female. Minors make up 13.7% of the population, and seniors make up 27.0%.

Lecce has several ethnic and linguistic minority groups. A Griko community of around 40,000 lives in the Grecia Salentina region in the central area of the province, and there is an Arbëreshe community in Soleto.

=== Immigration ===
As of 2025, immigrants make up 7.6% of the population. The 5 largest foreign countries of birth are Switzerland, Germany, Romania, Albania, and Morocco.

== Tourism ==
The San Cataldo Nature Reserve is located in the province. It is a 28 hectares (69 acres) protected area that was set up in 1977 along the Adriatic coast near Lecce. The Reserve is home to a large number of animals such as foxes, hedgehogs, badgers, weasels, reptiles and birds. A variety of Mediterranean plants species is also found here. Lakes Alimini Grande and Alimini Piccolo are also located in the province. Lake Alimini Grande is surrounded by a rocky area covered with pine woods and Mediterranean vegetation; also, its depth does not exceed four meters, and the water is rich with shellfish. Lake Alimini Piccolo is found further inland and consists of freshwater; this water comes from the groundwater channel of the Rio Grande. Alimini Piccolo's depth does not exceed half a meter.

Another tourist destination is the Ciolo, which is a canyon and includes also many caves. It is a natural habitat for many species of vagile meiofauna and ferns.

== Sources ==
- Cassar, J.; Winter, M.G.; Marker, B.R.; N.R.G. Walton; D.C. Entwisle; E.N. Bromhead; J.W.N. Smith (2014). Stone in Historic Buildings: Characterization and Performance. Geological Society of London. ISBN 978-1-86239-376-9.
- Cinel, Dino (2002). The National Integration of Italian Return Migration, 1870-1929. Cambridge University Press. ISBN 978-0-521-52118-5.
- Domenico, Roy Palmer (2002). The Regions of Italy: A Reference Guide to History and Culture. Greenwood Publishing Group. ISBN 978-0-313-30733-1.
- Gentilcore, David (1992). From Bishop to Witch: The System of the Sacred in Early Modern Terra D'Otranto. Manchester University Press. ISBN 978-0-7190-3640-8.
- Macgregor, John (1843). Commercial Statistics: A Digest of the Productive Resources, Commercial Legislation, Customs Tariffs ... of All Nations, Including All British Commercial Treaties with Foreign States ... Nott.
- Mikropoulos, Tassos A. Elevating and Safeguarding Culture Using Tools of the Information Society: Dusty traces of the Muslim culture. Earthlab. ISBN 978-960-233-187-3.
- Snowden, Frank M. (2004). Violence and the Great Estates in the South of Italy: Apulia, 1900-1922. Cambridge University Press. ISBN 978-0-521-52710-1.
