= Poggiardo =

- Comune
- Comune di Poggiardo
- Location within Italy Location within Apulia
- Coordinates: 40°3′N 18°23′E
- Country: Italy
- Region: Apulia
- Province: Lecce (LE)
- Frazioni: Vaste

Area
  - Total: 19.80 km^{2} (7.64 sq mi)
- Elevation: 90 m (300 ft)

Population (June 2010)
  - Total: 6,123
  - Density: 309.2/km^{2} (800.9/sq mi)
- Demonym: Poggiardesi
- Time zone: UTC+1 (CET)
  - Summer (DST): UTC+2 (CEST)
- Postal code: 73037
- Dialing code: 0836
- ISTAT code: 075061
- Patron saint: Sant'Antonio di Padova
- Saint day: 13 June
- Website: Official website

Poggiardo (Salentino: Pusciardu) is a town and comune in the Italian province of Lecce in the Apulia region of south-east Italy. An old Messapian town, Vaste, is located in its territory as a frazione.
