= Matino =

- Comune
- Comune di Matino
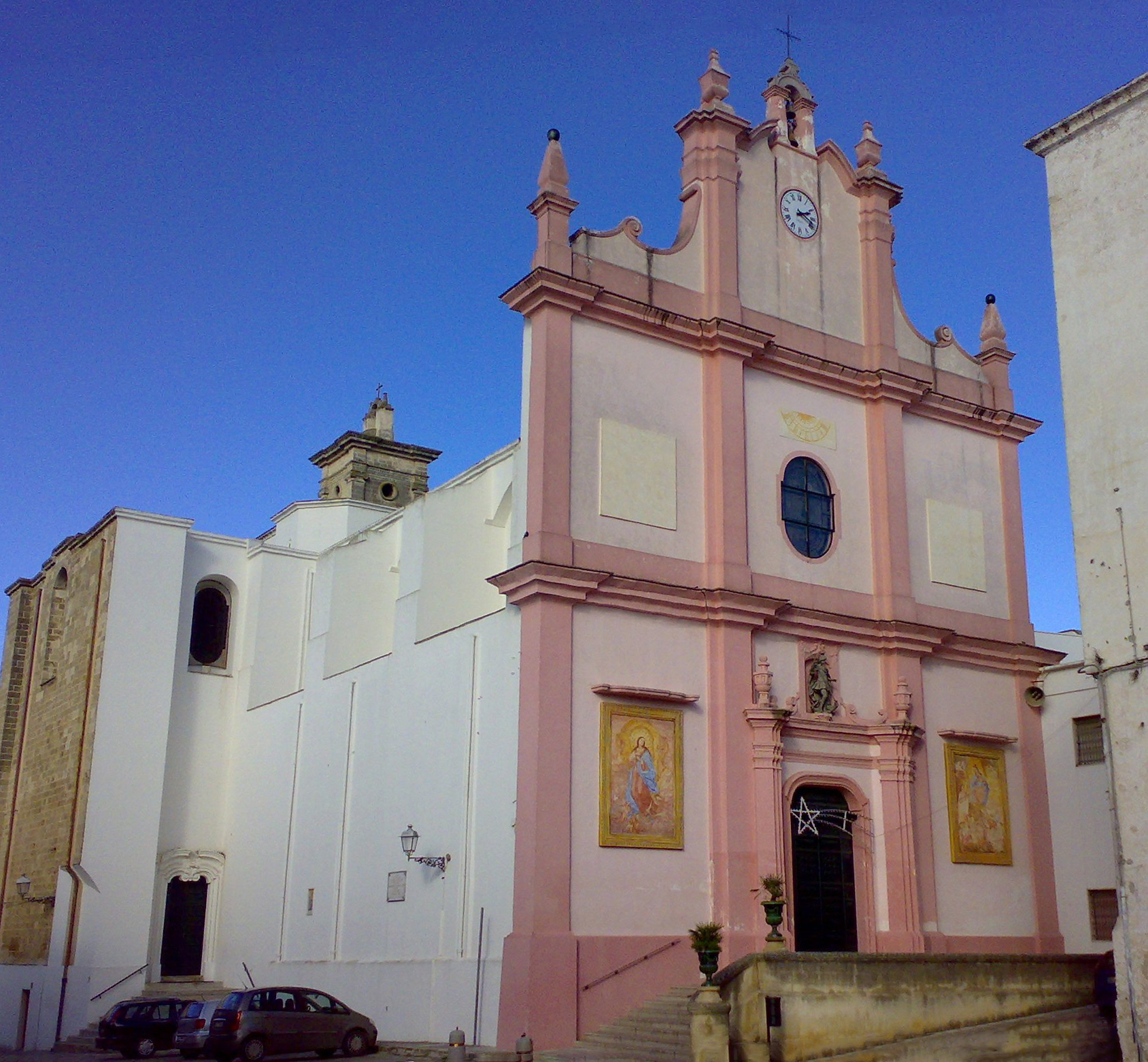
- Church of San Giorgio.

- Coat of arms

- Location of Matino in Italy Matino (Apulia)
- Coordinates: 40°2′N 18°8′E
- Country: Italy
- Region: Apulia
- Province: Lecce (LE)
- Frazioni: Cumentu (centro), Paduli Piani, Peppiceddhru, Puntusu, Sacro Cuore, Bosco, Sant'Anastasia,

Government
  - Mayor: Giorgio Salvatore Toma

Area
  - Total: 26.63 km^{2} (10.28 sq mi)
- Elevation: 75 m (246 ft)

Population (31 December 2017)
  - Total: 11,444
  - Density: 429.7/km^{2} (1,113/sq mi)
- Demonym: Matinesi
- Time zone: UTC+1 (CET)
  - Summer (DST): UTC+2 (CEST)
- Postal code: 73046
- Dialing code: 0833
- ISTAT code: 075042
- Patron saint: San Giorgio Martire
- Saint day: 23 April
- Website: Official website

Matino is a town and comune in the province of Lecce in the Apulia region of south-east Italy.
