= Collepasso =

- Comune
- Comune di Collepasso
- Location within Italy Location within Apulia
- Coordinates: 40°4′N 18°10′E
- Country: Italy
- Region: Apulia
- Province: Lecce (LE)

Government
  - Mayor: Laura Manta

Area
  - Total: 12.79 km^{2} (4.94 sq mi)
- Elevation: 120 m (390 ft)

Population (30 June 2017)
  - Total: 6,023
  - Density: 470.9/km^{2} (1,220/sq mi)
- Demonym: Collepassesi
- Time zone: UTC+1 (CET)
  - Summer (DST): UTC+2 (CEST)
- Postal code: 73040
- Dialing code: 0833
- ISTAT code: 075021
- Patron saint: Madonna delle Grazie
- Saint day: 8 September
- Website: Official website

Collepasso (Salentino: Culupazzu) is a town and comune in the province of Lecce, Apulia, south-eastern Italy.
