= Alezio =

Alezio Alytia (Greek)
- Comune
- Comune di Alezio
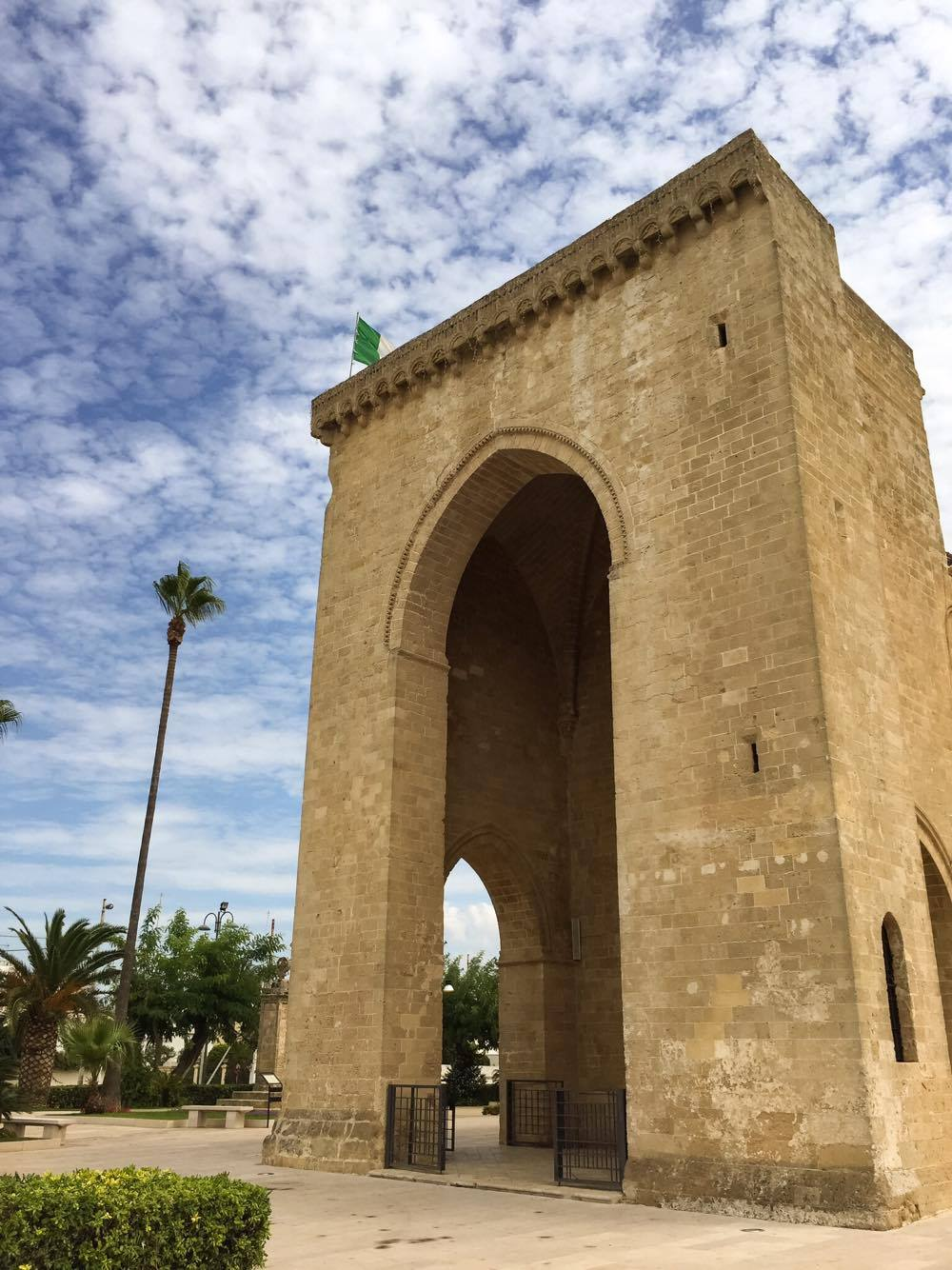
- Shrine of Our Lady of the Lizza

- Location within Italy Location within Apulia
- Coordinates: 40°4′N 18°03′E
- Country: Italy
- Region: Apulia
- Province: Lecce (LE)

Government
  - Mayor: Andrea Barone

Area
  - Total: 16 km^{2} (6.2 sq mi)
- Elevation: 75 m (246 ft)

Population (1 January 2017)
  - Total: 5,695
  - Density: 360/km^{2} (920/sq mi)
- Demonym: Aletini
- Time zone: UTC+1 (CET)
  - Summer (DST): UTC+2 (CEST)
- Postal code: 73011
- Dialing code: 0833
- ISTAT code: 075003
- Patron saint: Madonna della Lizza
- Saint day: 15 August
- Website: Official website

Alezio (Messapic: Alytia; Latin: Aletium) is a town and comune in the province of Lecce in the Apulia region of south-east Italy.

== History ==
Alezio (despite legend assigning its foundation to a king of Crete) was a centre of the Messapi, who would call it Alytia like their former capital in Acarnania. According to Pliny the Elder, the Aletines descended instead from the Iapyges, who descended by the Oscans. It is mentioned as Baletium in the Peutingerian Table (4th century AD). It was a stop on the Via Traiana, who connected ancient Apulia to Rome.

Around the year 1000, Alezio was destroyed by the Saracens, its inhabitants moving to the Gallipoli island. It remained deserted until the 12th-13th centuries, when a church dedicated to Santa Maria della Alizza or della Lizza was built by some Basilian monks. The new Casal d'Alezio, built around it, remained a small village until the 18th century. It was called Villa Picciotti from the 18th century until 1873, when the Messapic name was restored.

== Alezio DOC ==
Within Alezio is a 60-hectare (150-acre) region that produces red and rose DOC wines that are a blend with up to 20% Negroamaro, plus Sangiovese, Malvasia and Montepulciano. Harvest yields are limited to 14 tonnes/ha. The wines are aged for a minimum of 2 years prior to release and must contain a minimum alcohol level of 12.5%.

== Main sights ==
- The Civic Museum of the Messapi, inaugurated in 1982, is a national monument of Italy. It houses remains from Messapic necropolises outside Alezio (4th-3rd centuries BC).
- The Sanctuary of Santa Maria della Lizza, usually considered to be built in the 12th-13th centuries, although remains of a Byzantine-style fresco could date its foundation to some two centuries before. The remains of the frescoes, which once covered the whole interior, span a range of time from the 10th and the 16th century. Most of them dealt with stories of the life of the Virgin Mary.
- Messapian Necropolis, an ancient messapian necropolis, located in Monte Delia area, found by archaeological excavations.

== Transportation ==
Alezio is served by a railway station of the Ferrovie Sud-Est, which also holds several bus services in the area.
