= Cutrofiano =

Cutrofiano Κουτρουφιάνα/Kutrufiàna (Griko) Merpignanu (Salentino)
- Comune
- Comune di Cutrofiano
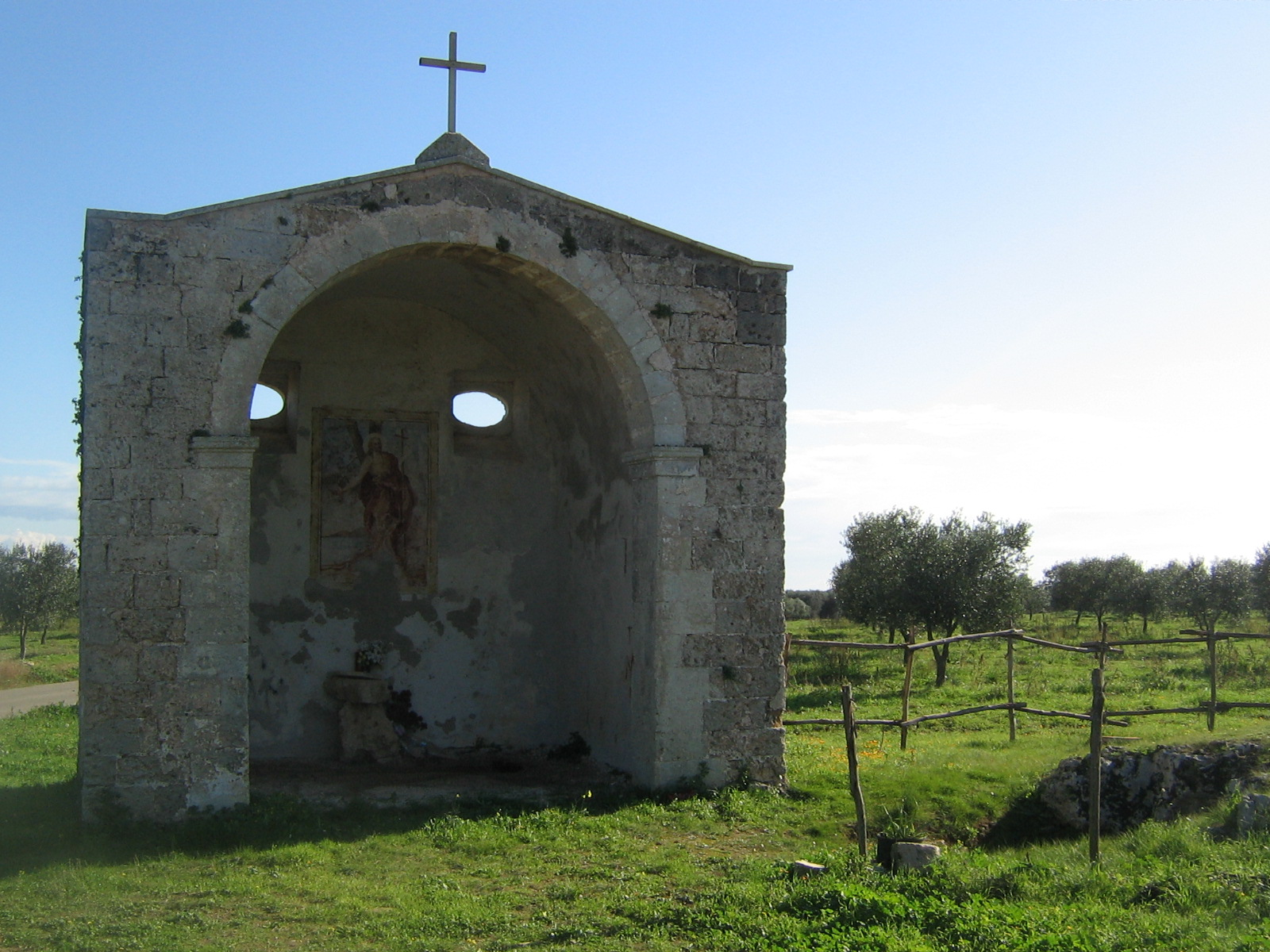
- Small church of San Giovanni Battista.

- Location within Italy Location within Apulia
- Coordinates: 40°07′N 18°12′E
- Country: Italy
- Region: Apulia
- Province: Lecce (LE)

Government
  - Mayor: Luigi Melissano

Area
  - Total: 56.81 km^{2} (21.93 sq mi)
- Elevation: 81 m (266 ft)

Population (1st January 2024)
  - Total: 8,684
  - Density: 152.9/km^{2} (395.9/sq mi)
- Demonym: Cutrofianesi
- Time zone: UTC+1 (CET)
  - Summer (DST): UTC+2 (CEST)
- Postal code: 73020
- Dialing code: 0836
- ISTAT code: 075026
- Patron saint: St. Anthony of Padua
- Website: Official website

Cutrofiano (Salentino: Cutrufiànu; Griko: Κουτρουφιάνα translit. Kutrufiàna ) is a town and comune in the province of Lecce in the Apulia region of south-east Italy. It is known for its shoes and ceramic production.

Main sights include the Mother Church (Chiesa matrice, 17th century) and that of the Immaculate Conception (18th century). The economy is mostly based on agriculture (olive oil, wine, cereals, tobacco). Cutrofiano is also a center of ceramics craftmanship.

== History ==
Cutrofiano has been the only town in a group of medieval houses, that survived Turks' attacks.

Because of its closeness with a swamp, the town used clay since remote times: the ceramic industry is documented by a lot of earthenware objects found in Cutrofiano and by a Roman furnace that has been discovered during an excavation.

In the 1600s, once that Turks' attacks were finished, Cutrofiano started its expansion. Ceramic shops became very important for the town's economy. In 1745–1750, in Cutrofiano there were about 650 inhabitants and 150 of them made a living in the ceramics industry.

Cutrofiano has been part of Soleto's county since 1319, so it started being part of the big possessions of Balzo-Orsini, princes of Taranto, and Conti of Lecce. In 1484 the town was given to Del Doce-Capece, that in 1664 gave it to their relatives Filomarini, that kept it until that feudalism was canceled in 1806.

A peculiar case, linked to feudal sedition, was the Cutrofiano's wood one, that was part of the big mediterranean wood that in the past filled the low Salento. It extended for 714 ha and it was the main source of timber that served to stoke furnaces to produce earthenware products.

== Climate ==
Cutrofiano is part of the low Salento that has a mediterranean climate, characterized by mild winters and warm and wet summers. The lowest temperature is about 5°C and the highest is about 40°C.

== Etymology ==
Cutrofiano's name come from terracotta objects, that are typical of the town. Their name is ''cutrubbi'' and they are clay containers (from greek ''kutra'', that means vase). They gave to the town the name of ''Cutrubbiano'' that later was changed with ''Cutrofiano''.

== Society ==
Dialect

The dialect spoken in Cutrofiano is the Salentino dialect in its southern variant. Salentino dialect is full of influences linked to the various dominations: Greek, Roman, Byzantine, Lombard, Norman, Albanian, French and Spanish.
