= Salentino dialect =

Extreme Southern Italian dialect found in the Salento Peninsula, Italy

Salentino
- salentinu
- Native to: Italy
- Region: Salento (southern Apulia) formerly Corfu
- Language family: Indo-European: Italic; Latino-Faliscan; Latin; Romance; Italo-Western; Italo-Dalmatian; Italo-Romance; Extreme Southern Italian; Salentino

Language codes
- ISO 639-3: –

Salentino (salentinu; salintinu; salentino) is an Extreme Southern Italian dialect (italiano meridionale estremo in Italian), spoken in the Salento peninsula, situated in the south of the Apulia region of Italy.

== Overview ==
Salentino is a dialect of the Extreme Southern Italian language group (italiano meridionale estremo). It is thus closer to the Southern Calabrian dialect and the dialects of Sicily than to the geographically less distant dialects of central and northern Apulia (like Tarantino, Barese and Foggiano).

The traditional areas where Salentino is spoken are the province of Lecce, much of the southern part of the province of Brindisi, and the southern part of the province of Taranto.

== History ==
The Salentino dialect is a product of the different powers and/or populations that have had a presence in the peninsula over the centuries: indigenous Messapian, Ancient Greek, Roman, Byzantine Greek, Lombard, French and Spanish influences are all, to differing levels, present in the modern dialect, but the Greek substratum has had a particular impact on the phonology and the lexicon of this language. Salentino is thus a derivative of local dialects of Vulgar Latin, with a strong Greek substratum.

The oldest text in Salentino is in the margin notes of a copy of the Mishnah known as Parma A written between 1072 and 1073. It is written in the Judeo-Salentino dialect of Salentino which is now extinct.

During the Middle Ages, the area was home to both Romance-based dialects–the precursors to the modern Salentino–and Greek-based dialects in roughly equal measure. The areas of Greek speech have retreated over time, but Salento remains one of two areas of southern Italy, the other being southern Calabria, where Griko can still be heard in some villages (today known collectively as the Grecìa Salentina).

== Characteristics ==
The term Salentino should be considered a general word to describe the various Romance vernaculars of the Salento peninsula, rather than one to describe a unified standard language spoken throughout the area. Indeed, in common with most other Italian languages, there are no agreed standards for spelling, grammar or pronunciation, with each locality and even generation having its own peculiarities. What unites the various local dialects of the Salento is their shared differences from the dialects further north in Apulia, such as the Tarantino and Barese dialect, and their similarities with other varieties of Sicilian, particularly those found in Calabria. In Sicily efforts have been made by the non-profit Cademia Siciliana to standardise the orthography for written insular Sicilian. They have also adopted a 'polycentric' approach which suggests that Salentino should have its own orthography within a family of Sicilian orthographies.

Salentino has 5 vowels and an SOV (subject, object, verb) word order. There are six persons: jeu (I), tu (you, singular), idhu/idha (he, it/she, it), nui (we), vui (you, plural), idhi/idhe (they). And there are six tenses: present, imperfect, remote past, past perfect, past pluperfect, plus remote past.

=== Contemporary authors ===
Orazio Testarotta di Taviano (1870-1964): his real name is Oronzo Miggiano. The pseudonym by which it is known was chosen for specific reasons: the name Horace refers to the Latin poet with whom he shares the satirical character of his works; while Testarotta is the Italian translation of the capiruttu dialect because it always fell to the ground. His is a poem that uses satire to denounce the political and social situation of the time. In fact, there are three fundamental themes on which it is based: the political and social condition from fascism to the republican age; the condition of the people in relation to the economy; the industrial and technological progress that disrupts the entire system.

Giuseppe Susanna (1851-1929): his poetry has an ideological and progressive function, therefore in stark contrast to the previous dialectal poetry. The main objective in Susanna's works is the emancipation of the proletariat and peasants, based on a language no longer sentimental like that of the late 1800s.

Pietro Gatti di Ceglie Messapica (1913-2013): together with Nicola G. De Donno and Erminio Caputo, he is one of the greatest representatives of that generation of authors who worked especially in the post-war period. It is a period characterized by greater freedom of writing and continuous experimentation. Above all, dialect poetry was radically renewed, now characterized by strong individualism and subjectivism.

Nicola Giuseppe De Donno di Maglie (1920-2004): he is part of the generation of authors born between 1915 and 1930. In his works he deals with very current themes and problems, ranging from autobiographism to satire to religious or social topics. It uses dialect as an autonomous language, free from any expressive compromise.

Erminio Caputo (born in Campobasso, in 1921): he also belongs to the generation of writers born in the first thirty years of the century. Born to Salento parents, he settled in Lecce in 1965, after occasional stays in Tuscany and marche. Unlike De Donno, who was an important point of reference for him, his is a predominantly religious poetics, linked not so much to the external reality that surrounds him, but to the inner, intimate reality of the soul.

== Sample text ==
Salentino	English
Aggiu lettu sulemente na fiata st' articulu	I read this article only one time
Stammatina aggiu cantatu	I sang this morning
Su’ turnatu	I returned
Ci tinia fame mangiava	If I was hungry, i’d eat
Aggiu ffare	I have to do
Aggiu ppurtare	I have to bring
Manciavi ci te tania fame	You could eat if you were hungry
Iddu ulia cu llu ddicu	He wanted me to tell him
Tocca cu bbiscia	(that) I need to see it
Iddhru è ertu basciu siccu	He is tall, short, skinny
Iddha ete de Cutrufianu	She is from Cutrofiano
Su'statu a mmare	I was at the seaside
U Marcu su’	I am Marco
Cci ghe beddu	How beautiful

== See also ==
- Salento
- Apulia
- Griko language
- Magna Graecia
- Catepanate of Italy
