= Griko people =

Ethnic Greek community of Southern Italy

Griko people Grecanici
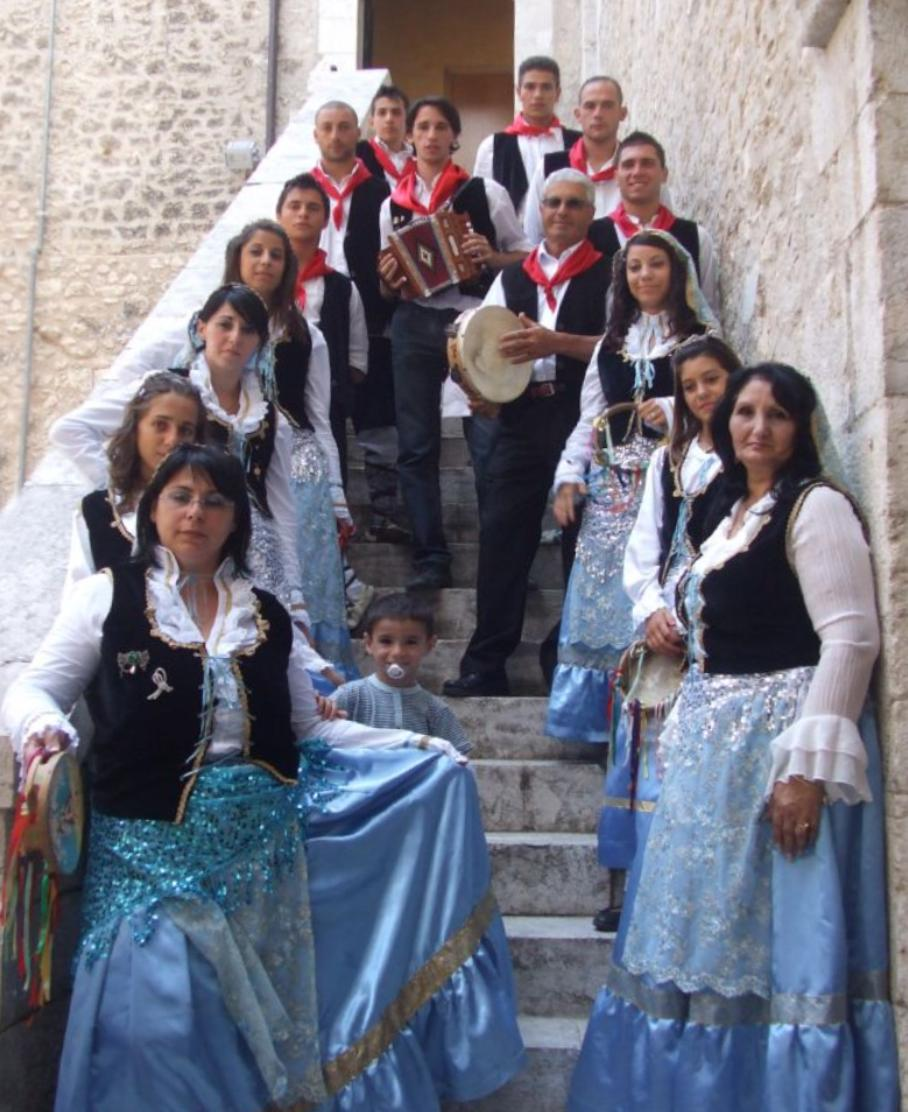
- Griko people in the Grecia Calabra area of Calabria, Southern Italy.

Total population
- c. 80,000

Regions with significant populations
- Southern Italy (especially Bovesia and Salento)
- Apulia: 54,278 (2005)
- Calabria: 22,636 (2010)
- Sicily: 500 (2012)

Languages
- Greek (Italiot dialects), Italian, Extreme Southern Italian (Salentino, Central–Southern Calabrian)

Religion
- Latin Church

Related ethnic groups
- other Greeks, Sicilians, Italians
- ^{a} Total population count only includes Griko people from Bovesia and Grecia Salentina regions. The number of Griko people from outside these regions remains undetermined.

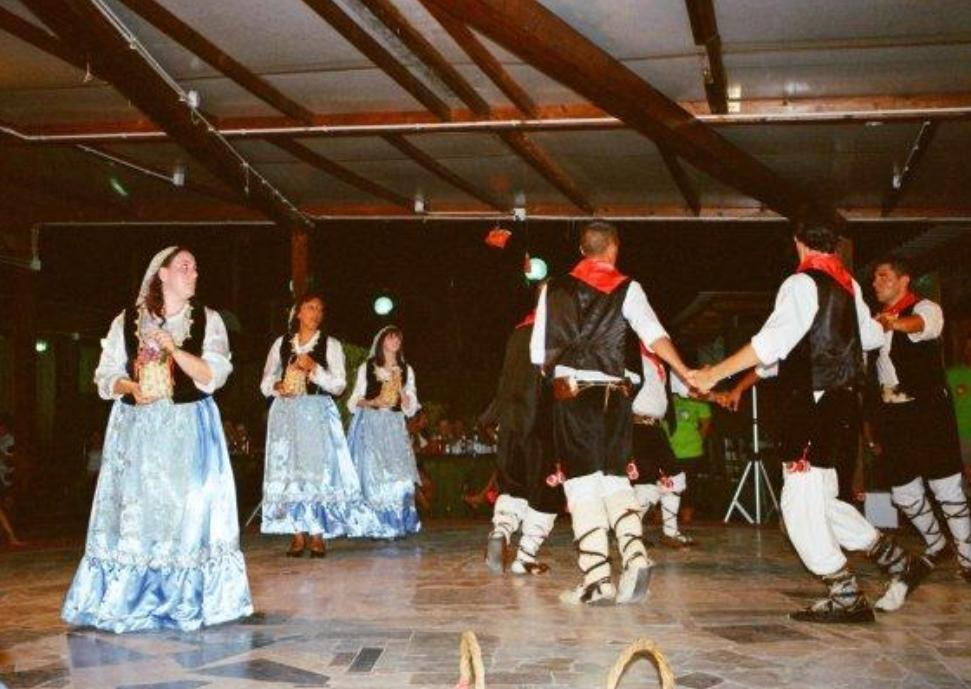
Griko people at a cultural event in Aspromonte, Calabria, Italy

The Griko people (Greek: Γκρίκο), also known as Grecanici in Calabria, are an ethnic Greek community of Southern Italy. They are found principally in Calabria and Apulia (peninsula of Salento). The Griko are believed to be remnants of the once extensive ancient and Medieval Greek communities of Southern Italy (the ancient Magna Graecia region), although there is debate among scholars as to whether the Griko community is directly descended from ancient colonists, from medieval migrations during the Byzantine period, or a combination of both.

A long-standing debate over the origin of the Griko dialect has produced two main theories. According to the first theory, formulated by Giuseppe Morosi in 1870, Griko originated from the Hellenistic Koine when Byzantine-era waves of immigrants arrived from Greece to the Salento. In contrast, Greek linguist Georgios Hatzidakis in 1892 and German philologist Gerhard Rohlfs argued that Griko represents an indigenous dialect evolved directly from Ancient Greek (notably Doric Greek), preserving archaic features from Magna Graecia.

Greeks have inhabited Southern Italy for millennia, arriving in successive migrations from the ancient Greek colonisation of Southern Italy and Sicily in the 8th century BC through to Byzantine Greek migrations caused by the Ottoman conquest in the 15th century. In the Middle Ages, Greek-speaking areas were reduced to isolated enclaves. Although most Greek inhabitants were Italianized and absorbed by the local population over the centuries, the Griko community preserved its Greek identity, language, and cultural heritage. Exposure to modern mass media has progressively eroded their culture and language. A genetic study on Calabrian Greeks from Aspromonte found them to be distinct from surrounding populations and to carry genetic ancestry connecting them to ancient Greek settlements in Magna Graecia.

The Griko traditionally speak Italiot Greek dialects (Griko in Salento or Grecanico in Calabria). By the 21st century, language shift to Italian had significantly reduced the number of active speakers, placing the dialects under severe endangerment. Today, most Griko are Catholics of the Latin Rite.

== Name ==
The name Griko derives from the traditional ethnonym for Greeks on the Italian peninsula. It is believed to trace back to the Graecians, an ancient Hellenic tribe that according to legend took their name from Graecus. The Graecians were among the first Greek tribes to colonize Italy, giving rise to the name Magna Graecia. The Latins subsequently applied this term to all Hellenic peoples. Another hypothesis holds that the ethnonym Γρῆκος/-α does not derive directly from Latin Graecus or classical Greek Graikos, but was an indigenous term used by neighboring Italic peoples in pre-Roman times.

== Distribution ==
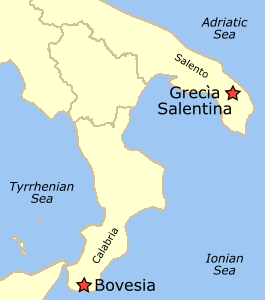
Griko-speaking regions in Salento (Grecìa Salentina) and Calabria.

The Greek-speaking territory of Bovesia lies in mountainous terrain around the southern Aspromonte massif. In modern times, many residents relocated to coastal towns. Calabrian Greek speakers inhabit villages including Bova Superiore, Bova Marina, Roccaforte del Greco, Condofuri, Palizzi, Gallicianò, and Melito di Porto Salvo. In 1999, the Italian Parliament recognized historical Griko territories under Law no. 482, encompassing Palizzi, San Lorenzo, Staiti, Samo, Montebello Jonico, Bagaladi, Motta San Giovanni, Brancaleone, and Reggio Calabria.

In Apulia, the Griko-speaking enclave is concentrated in Grecia Salentina, encompassing Calimera, Martignano, Martano, Sternatia, Zollino, Corigliano d'Otranto, Soleto, Melpignano, and Castrignano dei Greci. Surrounding towns in Apulia and Calabria that once spoke Greek lost the language during the 19th and 20th centuries, including Cardeto, Montebello Ionico, San Pantaleone, and Santa Caterina dello Ionio. At the beginning of the 19th century, today's nine municipalities of Grecia Salentina along with Sogliano Cavour, Cursi, Cannole, and Cutrofiano formed the Decatría Choría (τα Δεκατρία Χωρία), the thirteen towns of Terra d'Otranto preserving Greek speech. In earlier periods, Greek was also spoken in Galatina, Galatone, and Gallipoli, as well as inland across Catanzaro and Cosenza.

=== Villages in Italy ===
Griko villages typically have both an Italian official name and an indigenous Griko name:

- Apulia
  - Grecia Salentina:
    - Calimera
    - Cannole: Cánnula
    - Caprarica di Lecce: Crapáreca
    - Carpignano Salentino: Carpignána
    - Castrignano dei Greci: Castrignána
    - Corigliano d'Otranto: Choriána
    - Cursi: Cúrze
    - Cutrofiano: Cutrufiána
    - Martano: Martána
    - Martignano: Martignána
    - Melpignano: Lipignána
    - Soleto: Sulítu
    - Sternatia: i Chora (η Χώρα) or Starnaítta
    - Zollino: Tzuddhínu
  - Salento (historical enclaves outside Grecia Salentina):
    - Alliste, Galatina, Galatone, Gallipoli, Lecce, Otranto, Taviano
- Calabria (Bovesia / Grecia Calabra)
  - Africo: Άφρικον
  - Amendolea: Amiddalia
  - Bagaladi: Bagalades
  - Bova: Chòra tu Vùa (Βοῦα) or i Chora
  - Bova Marina: Jalo tu Vùa
  - Brancaleone
  - Cardeto: Kardia
  - Condofuri: Kontofyria
  - Gallicianò
  - Melito di Porto Salvo: Mèlitos
  - Montebello
  - Palizzi: Spiròpoli
  - Pentedattilo
  - Podàrgoni: Podàrghoni
  - Reggio Calabria: Rìghi
  - Roccaforte del Greco: Vuni (Βουνί)
  - Roghudi: Roghudion or Richudi
  - Samo: Samu
  - San Lorenzo
  - Santa Caterina dello Ionio:
  - Staiti: Stàti

== Official status ==
By Law no. 482 of 1999, the Italian parliament officially recognized the Griko communities of Calabria and Salento as a protected linguistic minority. The statute protects the language and heritage of historic Albanian, Catalan, Germanic, Greek, Slovene, and Croat communities, alongside speakers of French, Franco-Provençal, Friulian, Ladin, Occitan, and Sardinian.

In Sicily, Messina is home to a small Greek-speaking minority descended from Peloponnesian refugees fleeing Ottoman forces between 1533 and 1534, officially recognized under minority protection statutes in 2012.

== History ==
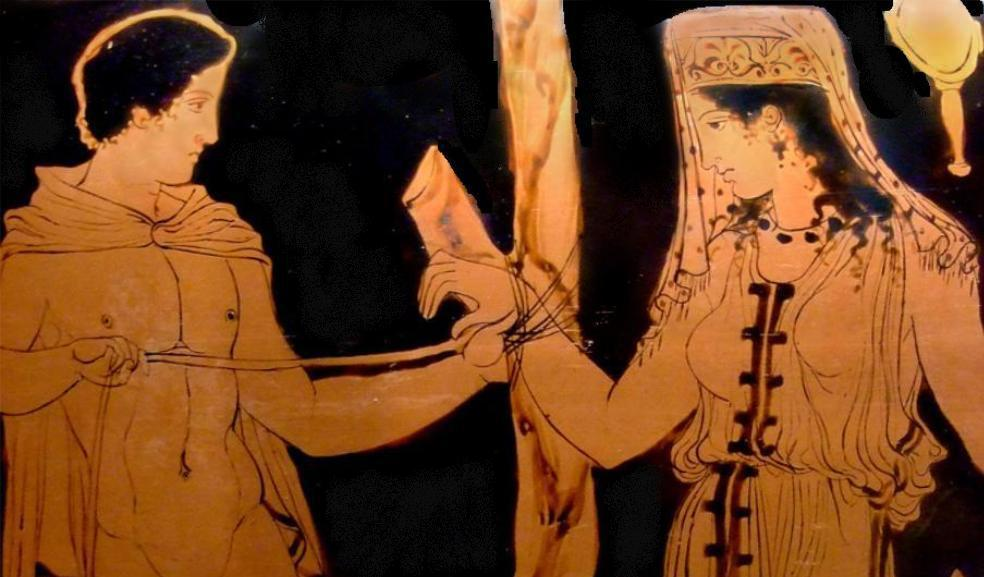
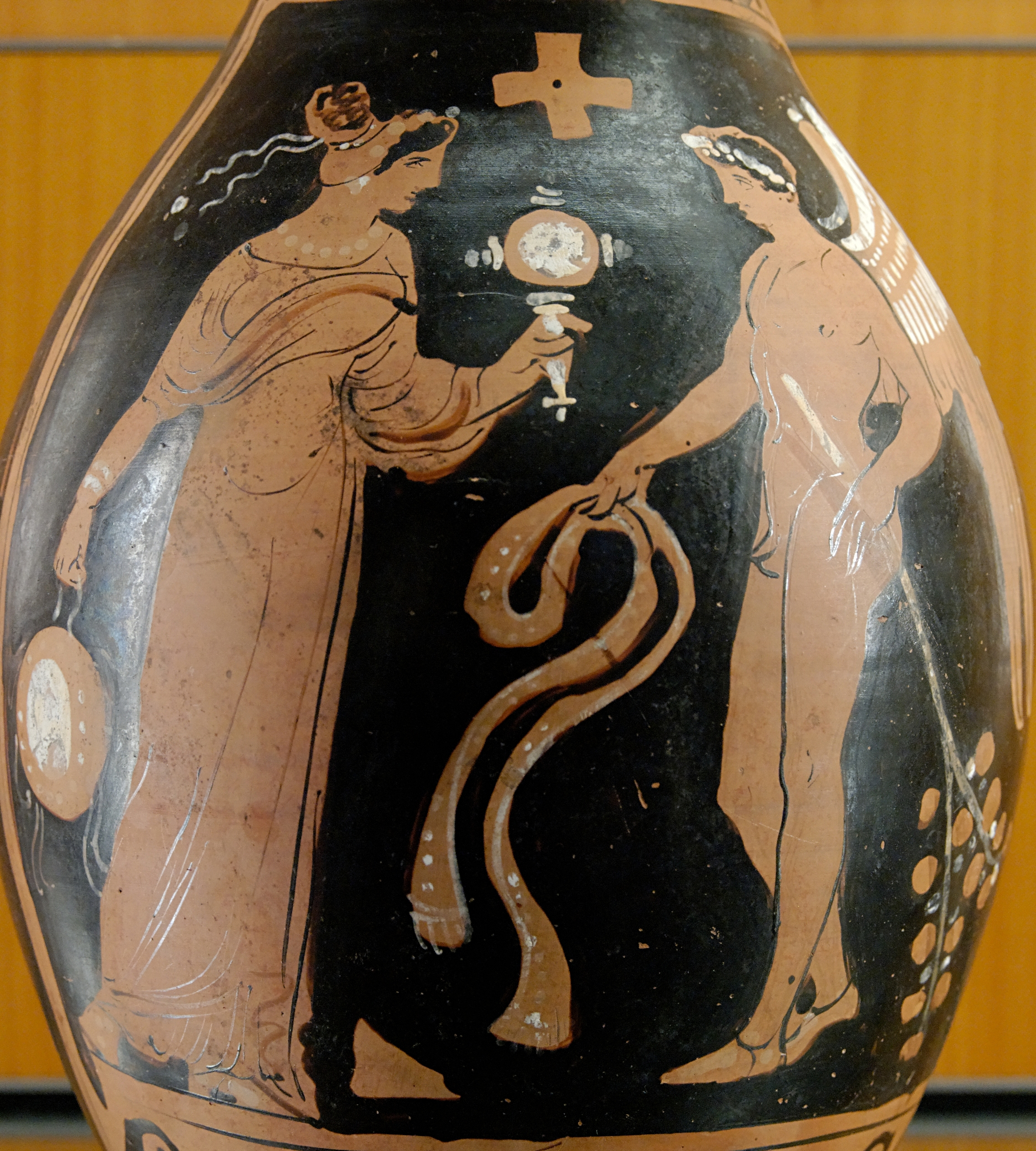
Ancient Greek scenes of Southern Italy. Perseus and Andromeda from a vase found in Apulia, c. 4th century BC (left), and woman holding a mirror and a tambourine from Magna Graecia, c. 320 BC (right).

=== Early migrations ===
The earliest Greek contacts with Italy date to the prehistoric era, when Mycenaean Greeks established maritime trade posts in Southern Italy and Sicily. Beginning in the 8th century BC, extensive Greek colonization established independent city-states along the coasts of Calabria, Lucania, Apulia, Campania, and Sicily. The density of these settlements led Roman writers to refer to the territory as Magna Graecia ("Greater Greece").

=== Medieval migrations and Byzantine era ===
During the Early Middle Ages, following the destructive Gothic War, Southern Italy was reintegrated into the Byzantine Empire. Subsequent waves of Greek-speaking migrants, including administrative officials, monastic communities, and civilian refugees displaced by Avar and Slavic incursions in Greece, settled across Calabria, Apulia, and Sicily.

These newcomers integrated with the indigenous Greek-speaking peasantry (*eredi ellenofoni*), who had preserved local forms of Hellenistic Koine and Doric dialects continuously since antiquity. In the 8th century, Byzantine Emperor Leo III the Isaurian transferred Southern Italy's ecclesiastical jurisdiction to the Ecumenical Patriarchate of Constantinople, reinforcing Hellenic religious and administrative influence. Historical records indicate that major portions of Calabria, the Salento, and north-eastern Sicily remained predominantly Greek-speaking through the eleventh century, when the Norman conquest terminated Byzantine political control.

Although the Byzantine political rule came to an end, Greek-speaking communities persisted to maintain their religious and linguistic traditions. Initially, the Norman rulers tolerated the existence of the Greek liturgic Christian communities, notably in Calabria and southern Apulia. Greek and Latin traditions coexisted with each other within the region, demonstrating the historical connections between the Byzantine Empire and Western Europe.

In the late thirteenth century, English scholar Roger Bacon recorded in his Compendium Studii Philosophiae that in parts of southern Italy the clergy and people remained entirely Greek, while a contemporary Old French chronicler similarly observed that the peasantry of Calabria spoke exclusively Greek. In 1368, Petrarch advised a student to travel to Calabria to study Greek among native speakers.

=== Latinization and modern period ===
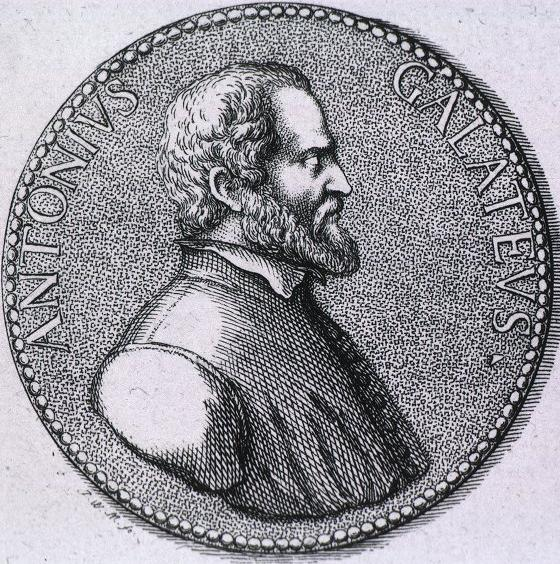
Antonio de Ferrariis (c. 1444–1517), Greek humanist from Galatone.

From the fifteenth century onward, accelerating after the Council of Trent in the sixteenth century, the Catholic Church and local feudal authorities systematically replaced the Byzantine Rite with the Latin Rite, promoting linguistic Italianization. Humanist scholar Antonio de Ferrariis (1444–1517) of Galatone observed that the inhabitants of Gallipoli conversed in Greek and retained classical traditions. Influxes of Greek refugees from the Peloponnese following the Ottoman conquest reinforced isolated linguistic pockets during the 16th and 17th centuries.

During the 19th and early 20th centuries, modernization, national unifications, and compulsory Italian-medium primary schooling marginalized the language. Griko was frequently stigmatized as a peasant patois; children were discouraged by parents and punished in public classrooms for speaking the dialect, leading to rapid generational shift toward standard Italian and regional Romance dialects.

=== Griko cultural revival ===
"We are not ashamed of our race,

Greeks we are, and we glory in it."

Antonio de Ferrariis (c. 1444–1517)

A cultural revival began in Grecia Salentina during the late 19th century through the work of Vito Domenico Palumbo (1854–1918) of Calimera, who collected Griko folklore, oral poetry, and songs while re-establishing contacts with mainland Greece. The linguistic research of German philologist Gerhard Rohlfs from the 1920s to the 1970s brought international academic recognition to Italiot Greek dialects. In the late 20th century, regional cultural associations, music festivals, and institutional recognition under Italian Law 482/1999 revitalized community interest in Griko identity and language maintenance.

== Culture ==
=== Music ===
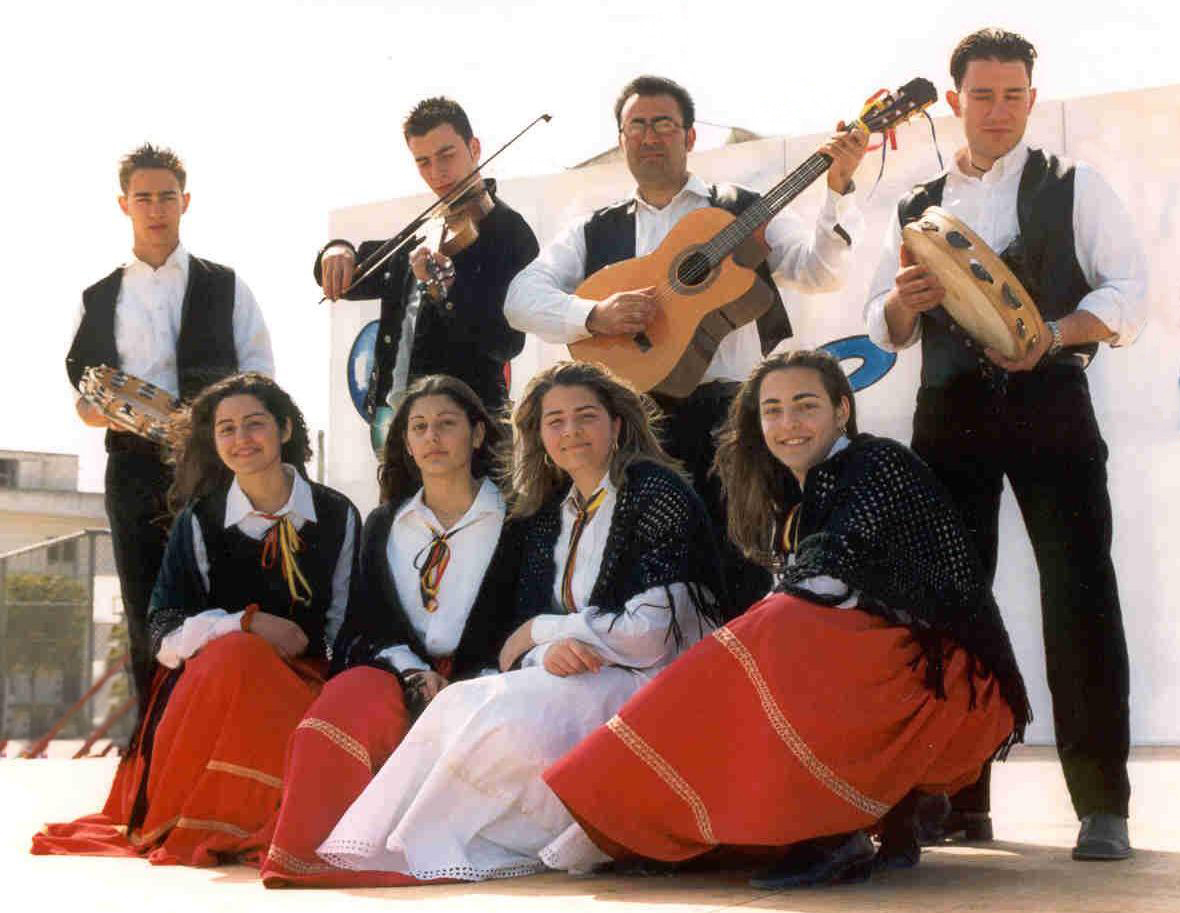
Griko cultural group from Salento

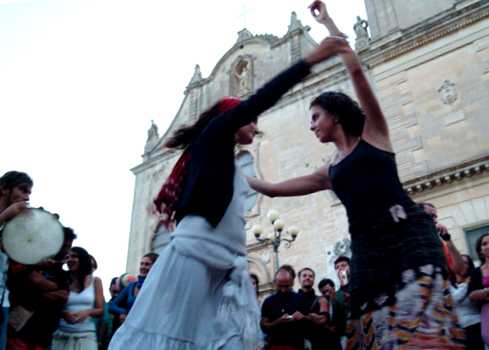
Example of Pizzica dance

The Griko possess an extensive oral tradition of folk music and lyric poetry. Distinctive musical forms include the Pizzica, an ancient fast-tempo courtship and healing dance connected to tarantism, and *moroloja* (funeral dirges). Griko songs are performed by traditional and neo-folk ensembles in Italy and Greece, including Canzoniere Grecanico Salentino, Ghetonia, Arakne Mediterranea, and Officina Zoè from Salento, alongside Astaki and Nistanimera from Calabria. Prominent Greek musicians including George Dalaras, Haris Alexiou, and Maria Farantouri have recorded songs in Griko.

In Melpignano, the annual Notte della Taranta festival draws over 100,000 visitors to performances of traditional Salentine music and Griko poetry. The Greek group Encardia was featured in the documentary *Encardia, the Dancing Stone*, celebrating the shared musical heritage between Greece and Southern Italy.

=== Language ===
The ancestral language of the Griko forms two distinct Italiot Greek dialects:

- Griko (or Grico), spoken in the Grecia Salentina area of Apulia.
- Grecanico (or Calabrian Greek), spoken in the Bovesia area of southern Calabria.

Both dialects exhibit archaic vocabulary, phonology, and grammar derived from ancient Doric and Koine Greek, combined with Byzantine Greek syntax and heavy centuries-long lexical exchange with neighboring Romance dialects (Salentino and Calabrian).

Griko additionally exhibits a number of features that are related to the Balkan linguistic area, including infinitive replacement and a duel complementizer system. Though it has these features, Griko is considered to be on the perimeter rather than a central member of the Balkan linguistic area.

UNESCO classifies both varieties as severely endangered. Approximately 20,000 speakers remain in Salento and fewer than 1,000 in Calabria, predominantly elderly individuals. Although Law 482/1999 officially recognized the dialects, Italian remains the primary language of administrative and scholastic instruction.

=== Religion ===
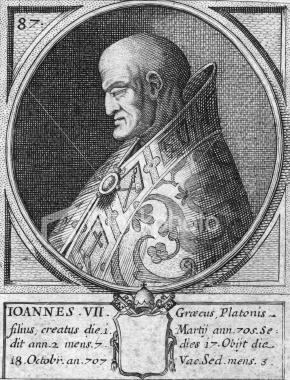
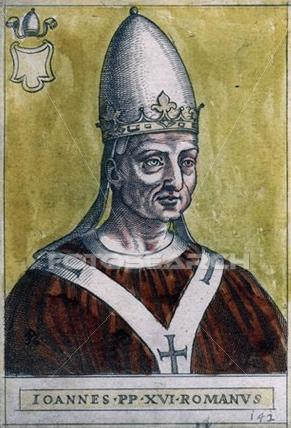
Popes of Greek descent from Rossano, Calabria: Pope John VII (c. 650–707; left) and Antipope John XVI (c. 945–1001; right).

Prior to the late Middle Ages, the Greek communities of Southern Italy adhered to the Byzantine Rite of Christianity under the jurisdiction of the Ecumenical Patriarchate of Constantinople, later transitioning under Roman papal authority while retaining Greek liturgical practices. Several popes of the late antiquity and early medieval eras hailed from Greek communities in Calabria, notably Pope John VII and Antipope John XVI.

Following the Norman conquest, Latin bishops gradually replaced Greek hierarchs. Greek liturgy was suppressed in Bova Cathedral in 1573 and in Salento by the late 17th century. Today, the Griko people are Catholics who worship under the Latin Rite.

== Literature ==
=== Early Griko literature ===
Between the 11th and 13th centuries, the Byzantine monastery of San Nicola di Casole near Otranto served as one of the preeminent centers of Greek learning in Western Europe. Its scriptorium produced extensive codices of classical Greek and Byzantine literature, patristic texts, and Byzantine liturgical poetry composed by hymnographers such as Nektarios of Casole.

Vernacular Griko literature was preserved primarily through rich oral poetry. Central to this oral corpus are the *moroloja* (from Greek μοιρολόγια), funeral laments chanted by women during wakes, which retain classical Greek metric structures and mourning imagery. In Calabria, vernacular oral literature included *strine* (rhyming songs performed during festive seasons) and fairy tales (*paramythe*), transcribed by 19th-century philologists including Domenico Comparetti and Giuseppe Morosi.

=== Contemporary literature ===
The contemporary literary tradition was inaugurated by Vito Domenico Palumbo (1854–1918) of Calimera, who compiled oral poetry, composed original lyric verse in Griko, and translated classical and modern authors into the dialect. In Salento, mid- and late-20th-century authors such as Rocco Aprile, Brizio Montinaro, and Franco Corlianò expanded vernacular writing; Corlianò's poem and song "Klama" ("Andramu pai"), depicting post-war Italian emigration to Swiss and German industrial centers, achieved international acclaim through recordings by Encardia and Greek vocalists.

In Calabria, literary efforts have centered on vernacular poetry, theatrical plays, and grammatical codification. Notable writers and philologists include Filippo Violi, Filippo Condemi, Angelo Maesano, and Salvino Nucera, whose works have been published in regional periodicals such as *La Zudda* and through cultural circles including the Circolo Culturale Grecanico Jalò tu Vùa.

== Cuisine ==
The traditional gastronomy of Grecia Salentina and Bovesia is centered on Mediterranean agriculture: cereals, legumes, wild greens, and olive oil.

Distinctive culinary preparations include:

- Lestopitta and Pitta: Traditional flatbreads of the Calabrian Bovesia.
- Ciceri e ttrìa: Fresh tagliatelle served with seasoned chickpeas and fried pasta ribbons in Salento.
- Cranu stompatu: Hulled wheat soaked, pounded, and cooked with tomato and pecorino.
- Sceblasti: A rustic yeast bread baked on stone hearths in Zollino, prepared with squash, olives, and onions.
- Aggute: A brioche-like Easter bread decorated with whole boiled eggs in Calabria, analogous to Greek tsoureki.
- Cuddhure: Easter ring pastries related to Greek *koulouri*.
- Scardateddhi: Anise-scented fried pastry rings coated in honey and sugar served at Calabrian weddings.

== Notable people ==
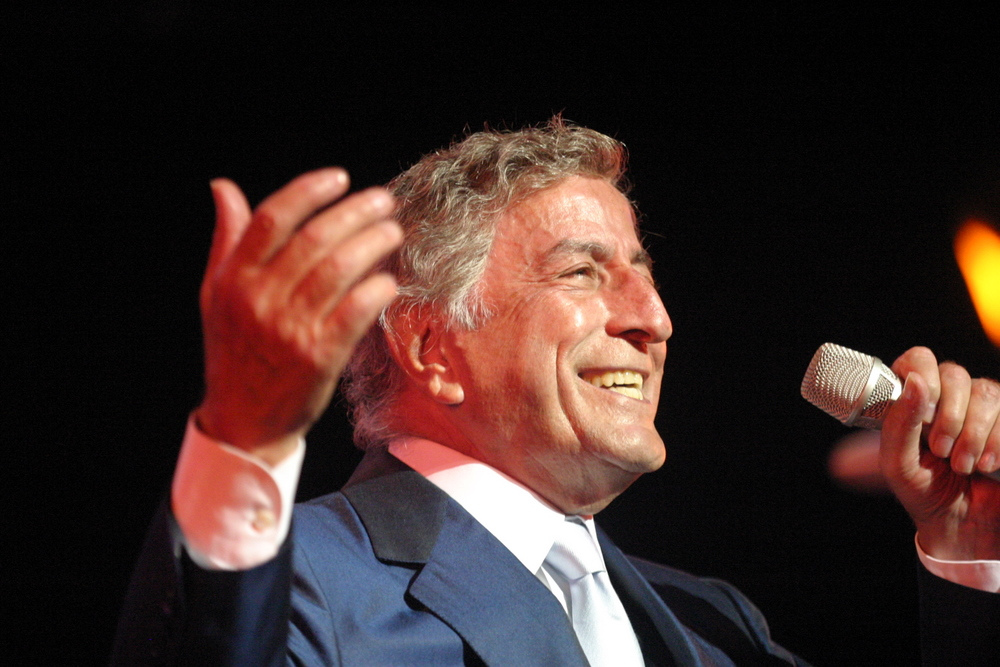
Tony Bennett's paternal family originated from the Griko village of Podargoni in Calabria.

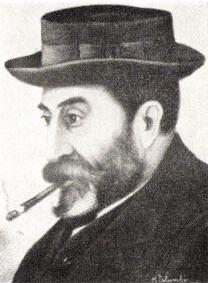
Vito Domenico Palumbo (1854–1918), scholar and poet from Calimera

- Pope Anterus (died 236)
- Pope John VII (c. 650–707)
- Pope Zachary (679–752)
- Nilus the Younger (910–1005), Greek monastic founder born in Rossano
- Antipope John XVI (c. 945–1001), clergyman born in Rossano
- Barlaam of Seminara (c. 1290–1348), philosopher, cleric, and humanist teacher of Petrarch
- Leontius Pilatus (died 1366), Calabrian Greek scholar who translated Homer into Latin for Boccaccio
- Antonio de Ferrariis (c. 1444–1517), humanist physician and geographer from Galatone
- Luigi Pirandello (1867–1936), Nobel laureate playwright of Greek ancestry (originally "Pirangelos")
- Tony Bennett (1926–2023), American singer whose paternal family emigrated from Podargoni in Calabria

== See also ==
- Greeks in Italy
- Italiot Greek
- Magna Graecia
- Byzantine Papacy
