= Melpignano =

Melpignano Lipignana (Griko) Merpignanu (Salentino)
- Comune
- Comune di Melpignano
- Location within Italy Location within Apulia
- Coordinates: 40°9′N 18°18′E
- Country: Italy
- Region: Apulia
- Province: Lecce (LE)
- Frazioni: Castrignano de' Greci, Corigliano d'Otranto, Cursi, Cutrofiano, Maglie

Government
  - Mayor: Valentina Avantaggiato

Area
  - Total: 10 km^{2} (3.9 sq mi)
- Elevation: 89 m (292 ft)

Population (November 2008)
  - Total: 2,221
  - Density: 220/km^{2} (580/sq mi)
- Demonym: Melpignanesi
- Time zone: UTC+1 (CET)
  - Summer (DST): UTC+2 (CEST)
- Postal code: 73020
- Dialing code: 0836
- ISTAT code: 075045
- Patron saint: San Giorgio
- Saint day: 23 April
- Website: Official website

Melpignano (Griko: Lipignana; Salentino: Merpignanu) is a small town and comune in the province of Lecce in Apulia, Italy. It is one of the nine towns of Grecìa Salentina. Melpignano has a population of 2,209 inhabitants (called Melpignanesi) and an area of 10.93 square kilometres (4.22 mi^{2}), thus showing a population density of 202,1 inhabitants per square kilometer. The comune rises 89 metres (292 ft) above sea level.

There are 84 industrial firms employing 474 people who are 60.69% of the total of the workers. There are 50 service firms employing 165 people who are 21.13% of the total of the workers. There are 39 firms employing 89 people who are 11.40% of the total of the workers. There are 23 administrative offices employing 53 workers who are 6.79% of the total of the workers.

The people of Melpignano, alongside Italian, also speak Griko, a Greek dialect. The language, folklore, traditions and history of Calimera, like those of the eight other cities in the area called "Salentine Greece", reveal significant Greek influences over the course of time, presumably from the time of the Byzantine control, or even the ancient Magna Graecia colonisation in the 8th century BCE.
