= Zollino =

Zollino Τσουλλίνου/Tsuḍḍinu (Griko) Tsuḍḍinu (Salentino)
- Comune
- Comune di Zollino
- Coat of arms

- Location within Italy Location within Apulia
- Coordinates: 40°12′N 18°15′E
- Country: Italy
- Region: Apulia
- Province: Lecce (LE)
- Frazioni: Calimera, Corigliano d'Otranto, Martano, Martignano, Soleto, Sternatia

Government
  - Mayor: Martin Zollino

Area
  - Total: 9 km^{2} (3.5 sq mi)
- Elevation: 90 m (300 ft)

Population (November 2008)
  - Total: 2,105
  - Density: 230/km^{2} (610/sq mi)
- Demonym: Zollinesi
- Time zone: UTC+1 (CET)
  - Summer (DST): UTC+2 (CEST)
- Postal code: 73010
- Dialing code: 0836
- ISTAT code: 075094
- Patron saint: Sant'Antonio di Padova
- Saint day: 13 June and 23 August
- Website: Official website

Zollino (Griko: Τσουλλίνου, translit. Tsuḍḍinu; Salentino: Tsuḍḍinu) is a small town and comune of 2,194 inhabitants in the province of Lecce in Apulia, Italy. It is one of the nine towns of Grecìa Salentina, which still keeps Greek language and traditions.

== History ==
Archaeological evidence suggests the area has been inhabited since prehistoric times, as indicated by the presence dolmens and menhir structures. The exact origin of its foundation is uncertain: one theory suggests Zollino was established as a Iapygian colony from the nearby village of Apigliano. Another theory proposes that Zollino began as a rural settlement of people from the nearby town of Soleto, from which its ancient name Solino is believed to have originated. In ancient times, Zollino was an important trade centre between the Ionian and the Adriatic coasts.

During the Middle Ages, Zollino was part of the County of Lecce, established by the Hauteville Normands. In 1190, King Tancred of Sicily granted the village to Baron Berlinghiero Chiaromonte. Under Swabian rule, Zollino became integrated into the County of Soleto.

In the Angevin period, Zollino was again incorporated into the territory of Lecce. In 1384, Mary of Enghien included Zollino as part of her dowry upon her marriage to Raimondo Orsini del Balzo, Count of Soleto. Following Orsini's ascension to the title of Prince of Taranto, Zollino became part of the Principality of Taranto, remaining under its jurisdiction until 1463, when Giovanni Antonio Orsini del Balzo, son of Raimondello, died without heirs.

After his death, the Chiaromonte family, led by Tristan of Clermont, retained feudal rights over Zollino through his marriage to Catherine of Taranto, the daughter of Raimondello. Over time, the village passed through several noble families, until the abolition of the feudal system in 1806. The Greek Rite was practiced in Zollino until the 16th century.

== Main sights ==
- Mother Church of Saints Peter and Paul
- Menhir S. Anna
- Menhir "Stazione"
- Dolmen "Cranzari"
- The hypogeum oil mill
- Church of S. Anna
- Pozzelle
- Church of Saint Joseph
- Statue of Martin Zoleno
- Church of Madonna of Loreto

== Transportation ==
Zollino has a station on the Lecce-Gallipoli and Zollino-Gagliano del Capo railroads, served by the Ferrovie del Sud Est.

By road, it can be reached through the Lecce-Maglie SS16 Adriatica state road.
