= Corigliano =

Corigliano may refer to:

== Places ==
- Corigliano Calabro, a place in the Province of Cosenza, Calabria, Italy
- Corigliano d'Otranto, a municipality in the Province of Lecce, Apulia, Italy
- Corigliano-Rossano, a municipality in the province of Cosenza, Calabria, Italy

== People ==
- Enzo Corigliano (born 1997), French squash player
- John Corigliano (born 1938), American composer of classical music

== See also ==
- Cornigliano, a quarter of Genoa, Italy
