= Cursi =

Cursi Cùrze (Greek)
- Comune
- Comune di Cursi
- Location within Italy Location within Apulia
- Coordinates: 40°9′N 18°19′E
- Country: Italy
- Region: Apulia
- Province: Lecce (LE) Vicenza
- Frazioni: Bagnolo del Salento, Castrignano de' Greci, Maglie, Melpignano

Area
  - Total: 8 km^{2} (3.1 sq mi)
- Elevation: 90 m (300 ft)

Population (May 2009)
  - Total: 4,244
  - Density: 530/km^{2} (1,400/sq mi)
- Demonym: Cursiati
- Time zone: UTC+1 (CET)
  - Summer (DST): UTC+2 (CEST)
- Postal code: 73020
- Dialing code: 0836
- ISTAT code: 075025
- Patron saint: San Nicola di Bari
- Saint day: 23 May
- Website: Official website

Cursi (Griko: Κούρτσε translit. Cùrze; Salentino: Cùrze) is a town and comune in the Italian province of Lecce in the Apulia region of south-east Italy.

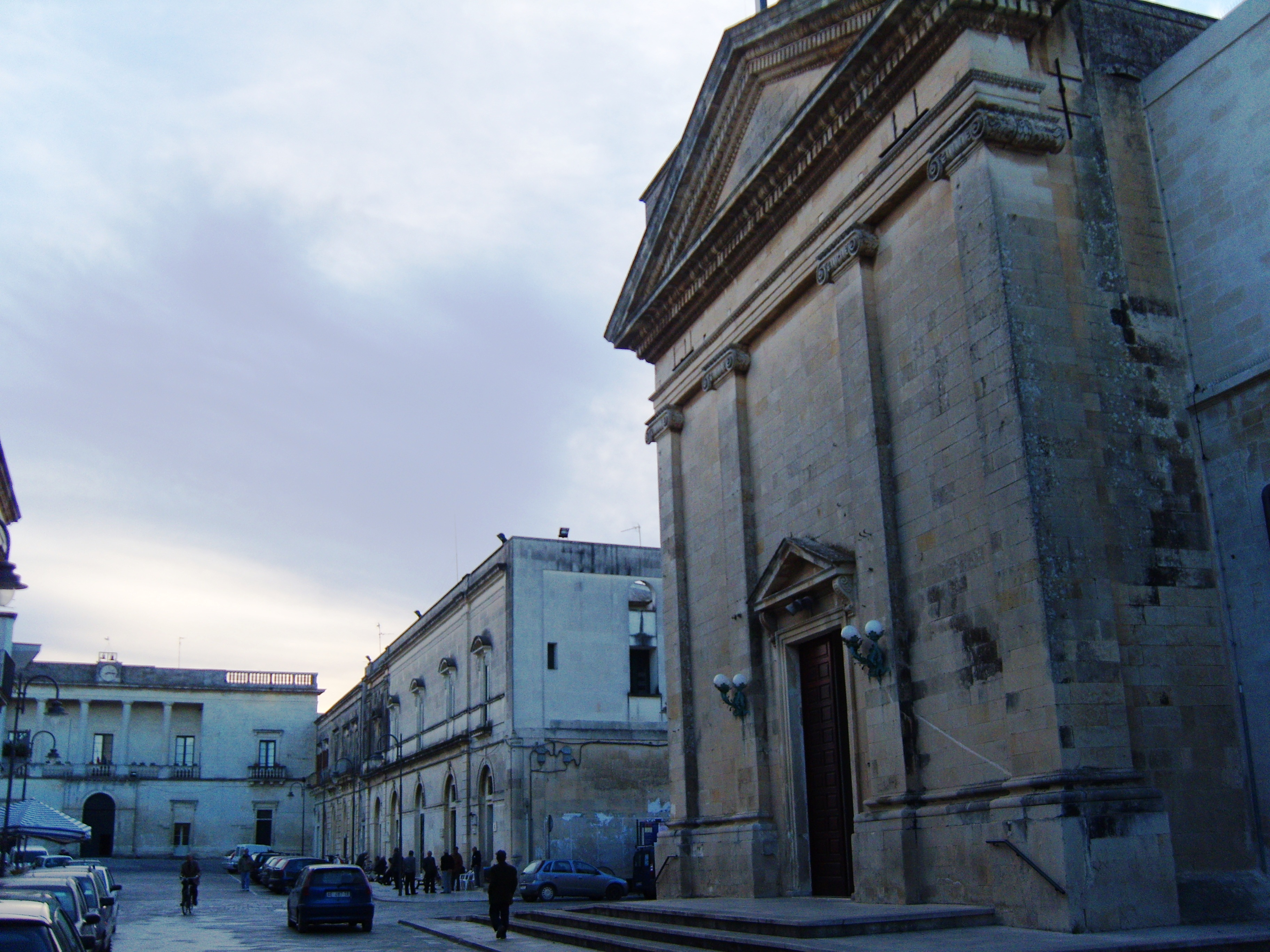
Square

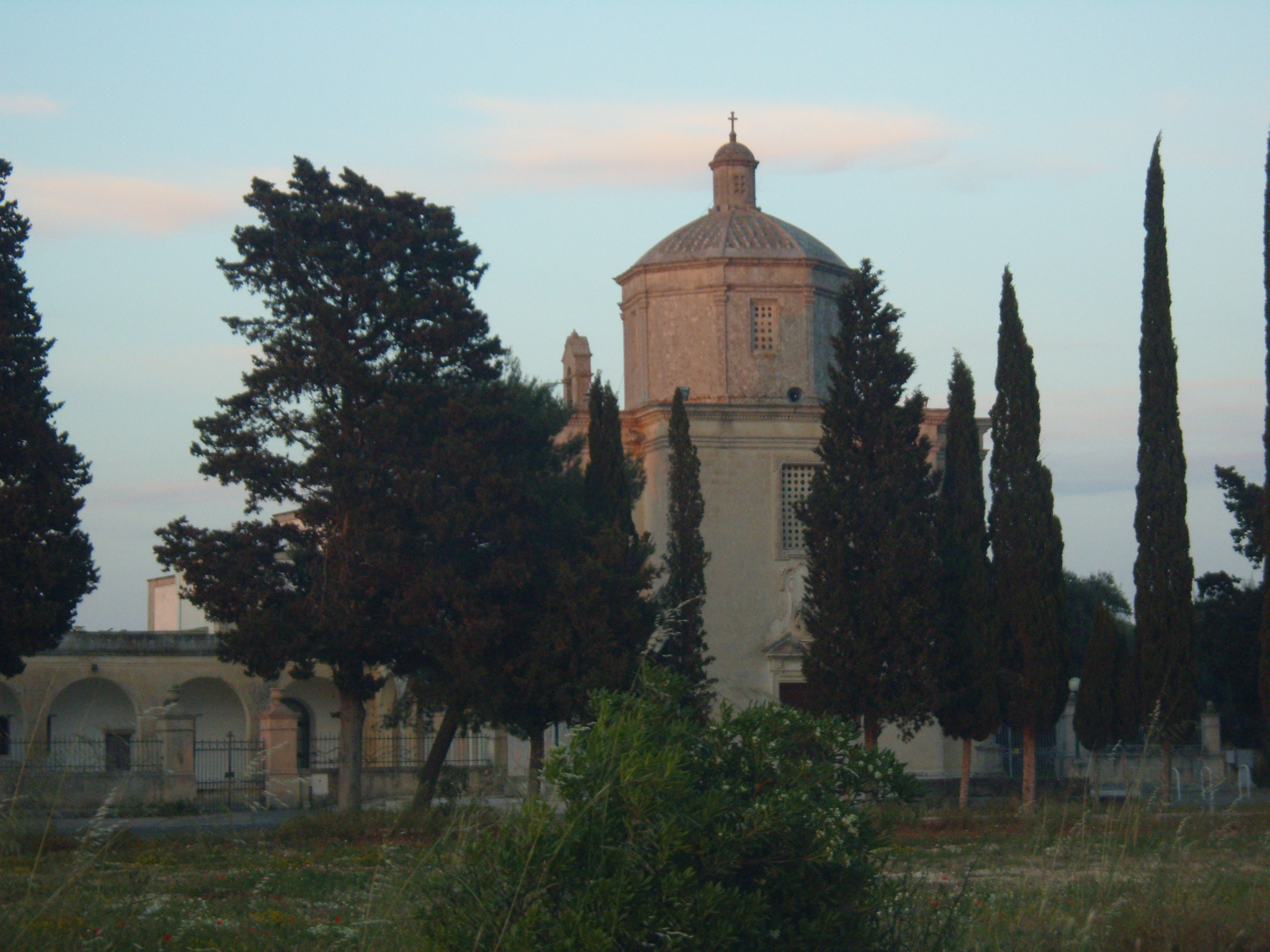
Maria SS. dell'Abbondanza sanctuary
