= Martignano =

Martignano Μαρτυνιάνα/Martignàna (Griko)
- Comune
- Comune di Martignano
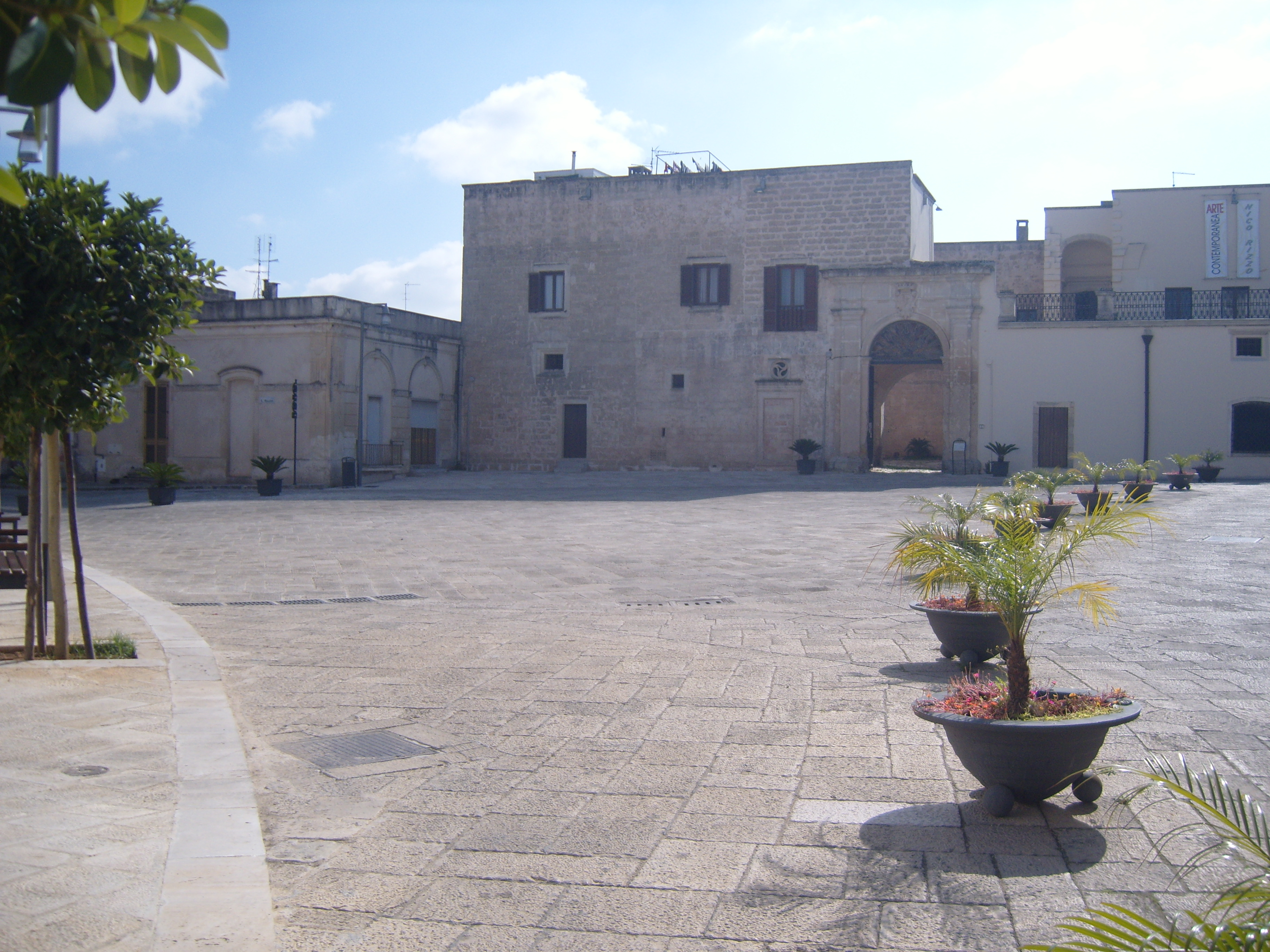
- Piazza Palmieri at Martignano

- Location within Italy Location within Apulia
- Coordinates: 40°14′N 18°15′E
- Country: Italy
- Region: Apulia
- Province: Lecce (LE)
- Frazioni: Calimera, Caprarica di Lecce, Martano, Sternatia, Zollino

Government
  - Mayor: Luigi Sergio

Area
  - Total: 6 km^{2} (2.3 sq mi)
- Elevation: 99 m (325 ft)

Population (November 2008)
  - Total: 1,784
  - Density: 300/km^{2} (770/sq mi)
- Demonym: Martignanesi
- Time zone: UTC+1 (CET)
  - Summer (DST): UTC+2 (CEST)
- Postal code: 73020
- Dialing code: 0832
- ISTAT code: 075041
- Patron saint: San Pantaleone
- Saint day: 26–27 July
- Website: Official website

Martignano (Griko: Μαρτυνιάνα, translit. Martignàna) is a small town and comune of 1,770 inhabitants in the province of Lecce in Apulia, Italy. It is part of Salento and is one of the nine towns of Grecìa Salentina, an area where the Greek dialect Griko is spoken.

== Famous people ==
Marquess Giuseppe Palmieri (Martignano, 1721 – Naples, 1793) was one of the most important figures of the Enlightenment in Southern Italy.

== Twinnings ==
- Kfar Matta, Lebanon

== Honorary citizens ==
- Sergio Vuskovic
