= Castrignano =

Castrignano may refer to:

- Castrignano del Capo, a town in the province of Lecce, Italy
- Castrignano de' Greci, a town in the province of Lecce, Italy, part of the Grecìa Salentina
