= Podargoni =

Coordinates: 38.1638°N 15.7802°E

Podargoni Podàrghoni (Greek)
- Comune
- Comune di Podargoni
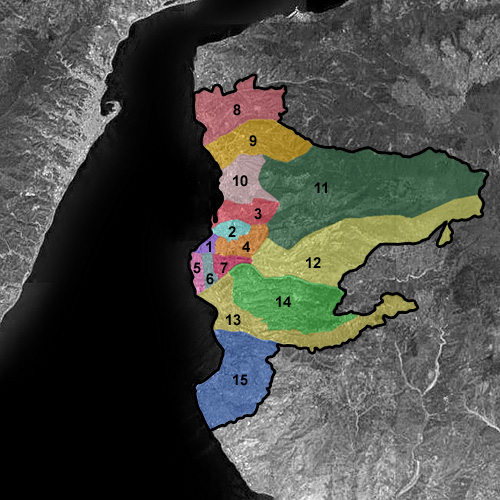
- Districts and neighborhoods of Reggio

- Location within Italy Location within Calabria
- Country: Italy
- Region: Calabria
- Province: Reggio Calabria (RC)
- Time zone: UTC+1 (CET)
  - Summer (DST): UTC+2 (CEST)

Podargoni (Italian pronunciation: [poˈdarɡoni]; Calabrian Greek: Podàrghoni) is a fraction in the Reggio Calabria, in the southern Italian region of Calabria. Together with Ortì and Terreti it forms the 11th district of the municipality of Reggio Calabria. It is a small town close to the Aspromonte mountains, and is 500 metres (1,600 ft) above sea level, at the foot of Mount Marrapà and on the left bank of the river Gallico. The town is inhabited by the Griko people who formerly spoke their ancestral Calabrian Greek dialect.

== Etymology ==
The name Podargoni is Greek in origin deriving from the Greek dialect formerly spoken in southern Calabria and originates from the Greek expression Podargos (πόδαργος) which means 'slow-footed'.

== History ==
The earliest reference to the town is in a 14th-century Vatican accounting document, but it is possible that the town existed earlier.

In the 17th century Podargoni, like other neighboring areas, had a remarkable demographic growth due to the movement towards the mountains of the inhabitants of coastal areas, repeatedly subjected to Ottoman raids. The village was damaged by the earthquake of 1783. "In the second class of 'places, it' such as the buildings are either rovinevoli, or injured,, include Reedy, Ceraso (sic), PODARGONE (sic), Terreti ..." (Story de'fenomeni the earthquake occurred in Calabria in the year 1783 ... ").

In 1811, after the administrative distributions the Kingdom of Naples commissioned by Joachim Murat, Podargoni became independent, a status he held until 1927 when it was incorporated in Greater Reggio.

In the last town, the country experienced a sharp depopulation as a result of emigration to the United States of America and, in the Second World War, to Canada and European countries (France-Belgium). Separately, transfers in the Strait.

A few years ago Podargoni was declared a protected medieval village of particular historical and environmental significance, but its architectural salvage program, which began in the 1990s, is stagnating. A decisive incentive to the rebirth of Podargoni, and the whole valley, promises the new freeway Gallic-Gambarie, under construction, and already accessible from the motorway junction Gallico and Mills Calanna (Bridge Calanna). The next section, already planned by the Province, will reach the area Podargoni.

== Places of worship ==
The Church of Santa Maria del Bosco.

== Notable people ==
- Tony Bennett (New York, August 3, 1926), born Anthony Dominick Benedetto, American singer whose paternal ancestors were originally from Podargoni. His father migrated from Calabria to the United States.
