= Carpignano Salentino =

Carpignano Salentino Καρπηνιάνα (Greek)
- Comune
- Comune di Carpignano Salentino
- Location within Italy Location within Apulia
- Coordinates: 40°11′49.36″N 18°20′18.29″E
- Country: Italy
- Region: Apulia
- Province: Lecce (LE)
- Frazioni: Cannole, Castrignano de' Greci, Cursi, Martano, Melendugno, Otranto

Area
  - Total: 48 km^{2} (19 sq mi)
- Elevation: 76 m (249 ft)

Population (November 2008)
  - Total: 3,854
  - Density: 80/km^{2} (210/sq mi)
- Demonym: Carpignanesi
- Time zone: UTC+1 (CET)
  - Summer (DST): UTC+2 (CEST)
- Postal code: 73020
- Dialing code: 0836
- ISTAT code: 075015
- Patron saint: Saint Antonio and the Madonna "della Grotta"
- Saint day: 2–3 July
- Website: Official website

Carpignano Salentino (Salentino: Carpignanu) is a town and comune in the Italian province of Lecce in the Apulia region of south-east Italy. It includes the frazione of Serrano.

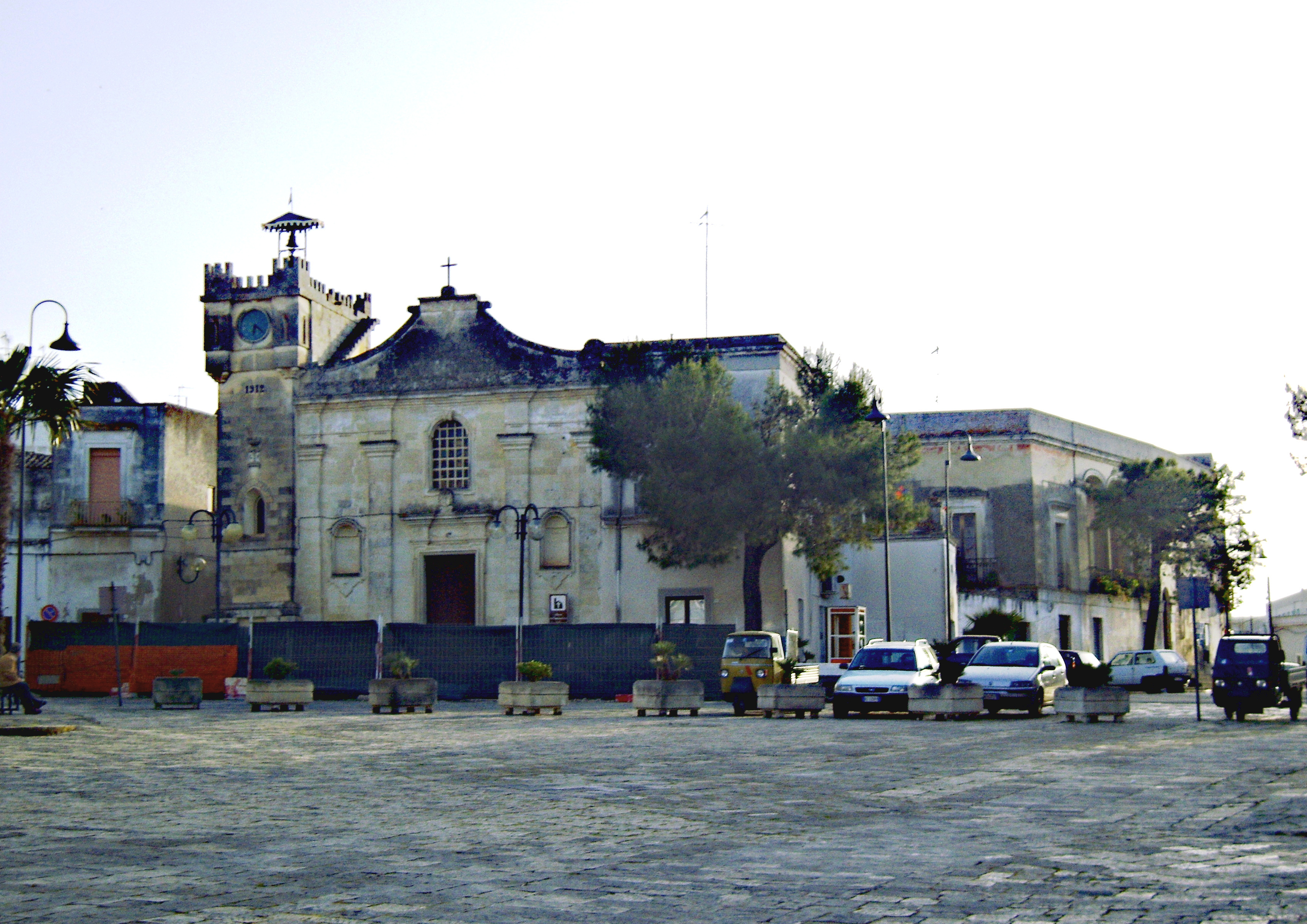
Square

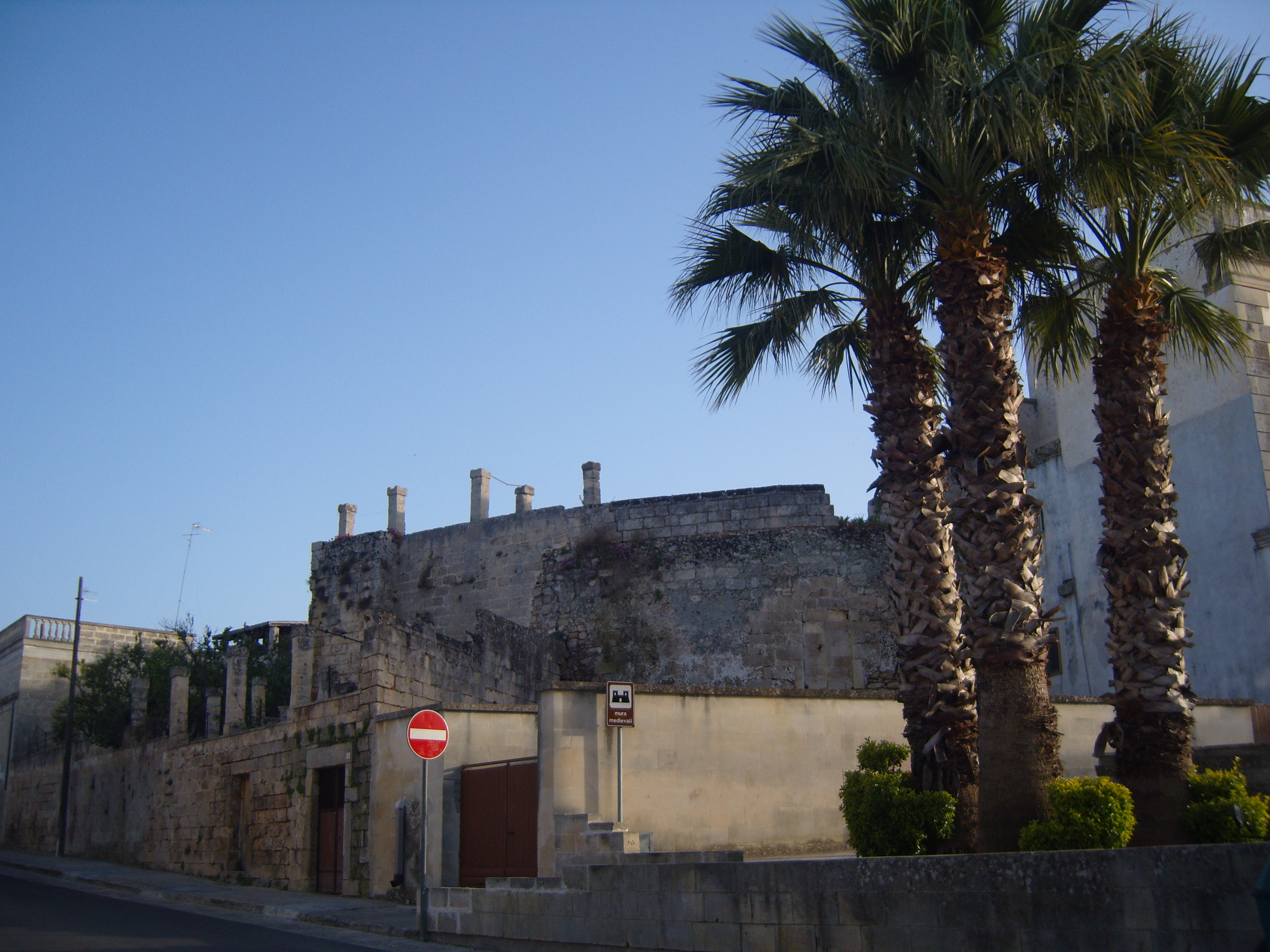
Medieval walls

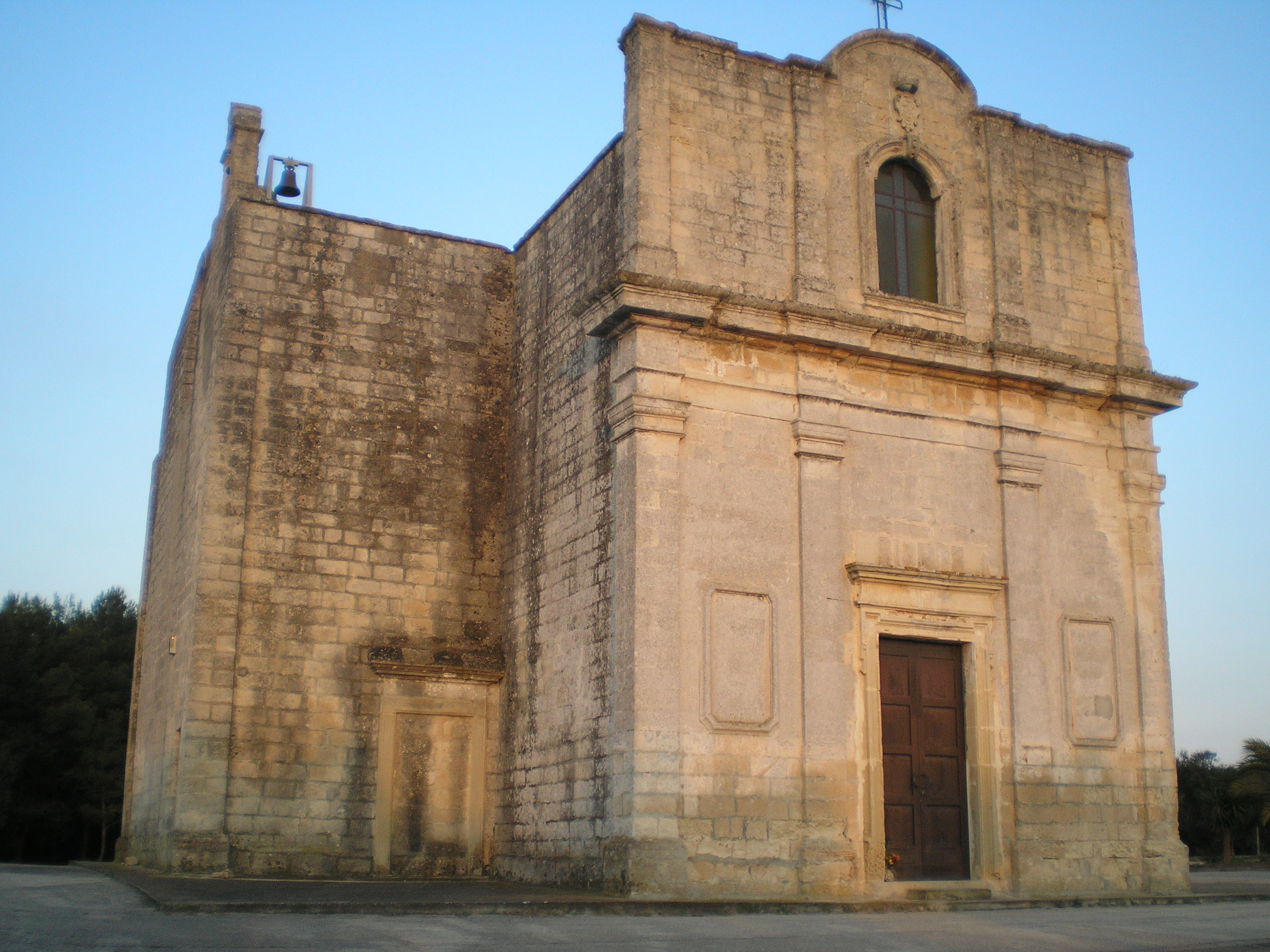
Byzantine church of Santa Marina in Stigliano, in the outlying area of Carpignano Salentino
