= Ghetonia =

Cultural group in Calimera, Grecia Salentina, Italy

- Origin: Calimera, Grecìa Salentina, Italy
- Genres: Griko music, folk, world music
- Years active: 1992–present

Ghetonia (Griko: Γειτονία, neighborhood) is a cultural group based in Calimera, Grecìa Salentina in southern Italy, which exists to preserve the music, poetry, language and folklore of the Griko-speaking people of Salento by documenting the various aspects of the Grecìa Salentina traditional life, history, language and folklore, and has published extensively on these subjects. However, Ghetonia is best known for its musical group whose members include Roberto Licci, Emilia Ottaviano, Salvatore Cotardo, Emmanuelle Licci, Angelo Urso and Franco Nuzzo.

== History ==
Born in 1992 from the idea of Roberto Licci (voice and guitar, member of the Canzoniere Grecanico Salentino), Salvatore Cotardo (sax) and Pierangelo Colucci with the aim of recovering the ancient local musical and cultural traditions. From the very beginning their music also recovered the ancient cultural belonging of Salento to the Mediterranean, which for some decades had been forgotten to pursue Western development models which later turned out to be ephemeral. Thanks in particular to Colucci and his knowledge of Arabic music and instruments, Ghetonìa were the first to use Mediterranean rhythms and sounds in their arrangements, a current that is today the most fertile but which in the early nineties was an absolute novelty.

The group has given numerous concerts not only in Italy but also abroad, especially in Greece, but also in the Balkans, Cuba and the USA where they were invited by the World Music Institute.

== See also ==
- Aramirè
