= Giuseppe Grassi (politician) =

Italian politician (1883–1950)

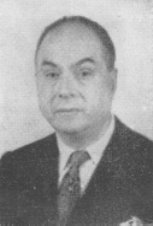

Minister of Justice
- In office 1 June 1947 – 14 January 1950
- Prime Minister: Alcide De Gasperi
- Preceded by: Fausto Gullo
- Succeeded by: Attilio Piccioni

Member of the Chamber of Deputies of Kingdom of Italy
- In office 8 May 1948 – 24 June 1953
- Constituency: Lecce

Member of the Constituent Assembly
- In office 25 June 1946 – 31 January 1948
- Constituency: XXVI (Lecce)

Member of the Chamber of Deputies of Kingdom of Italy
- In office 27 November 1913 – 25 January 1924

Personal details
- Born: 8 May 1883 Martano, Kingdom of Italy
- Died: 25 August 1950 (aged 67)
- Party: Italian Liberal Party
- Spouse: Isabella Carissimo
- Children: 4
- Education: Sapienza University of Rome
- Profession: Lawyer, University professor

Giuseppe Grassi (8 May 1883 in Martano – 25 August 1950) was a 20th-century Italian politician. Member of the Italian Liberal Party, he served as Minister of Justice in Alcide De Gasperi's fourth and fifth cabinets between 1947 and 1950. He signed, as Keeper of the Seals, the Constitution of Italy in 1948.

== Biography ==
Giuseppe Grassi was born of noble origins: Grassi was an ancient family of 1100 AD derived from William VI, Duke of Aquitaine (descendant of one of the twelve sons of Tancred of Hauteville) and was a feudal lord of Alessano under King William II of Sicily. The original family from Otranto branched out and enjoyed nobility with the predicate of Martano (Lecce). Giuseppe was adopted by his uncle, Prince Sebastiano (brother of his mother, who died very young) and added to his surname that of Apostolico Orsini Ducas. He was the son of Michelina Apostolico and Pasquale.

His cultural training originated in the Argento college of Lecce, where he studied within the Society of Jesus, following in the footsteps of the Apostolic family. Son of the evolutionary process of Lecce's political Catholicism, his intellectual maturation was of a liberal type. He then studied law at the University of Rome, where he developed a passion for politics and an interest in research in the field of public law. He graduated in 1905 with a thesis in constitutional law.

In 1907, Grassi married Isabella Carissimo, with whom he would later have four children: Mary, Guglielmo, Fabio and Vittoria.

He hosted the Savoy family in his estate in Materdomini before exile.
