= Gerhard Rohlfs =

German linguist (1892–1986)

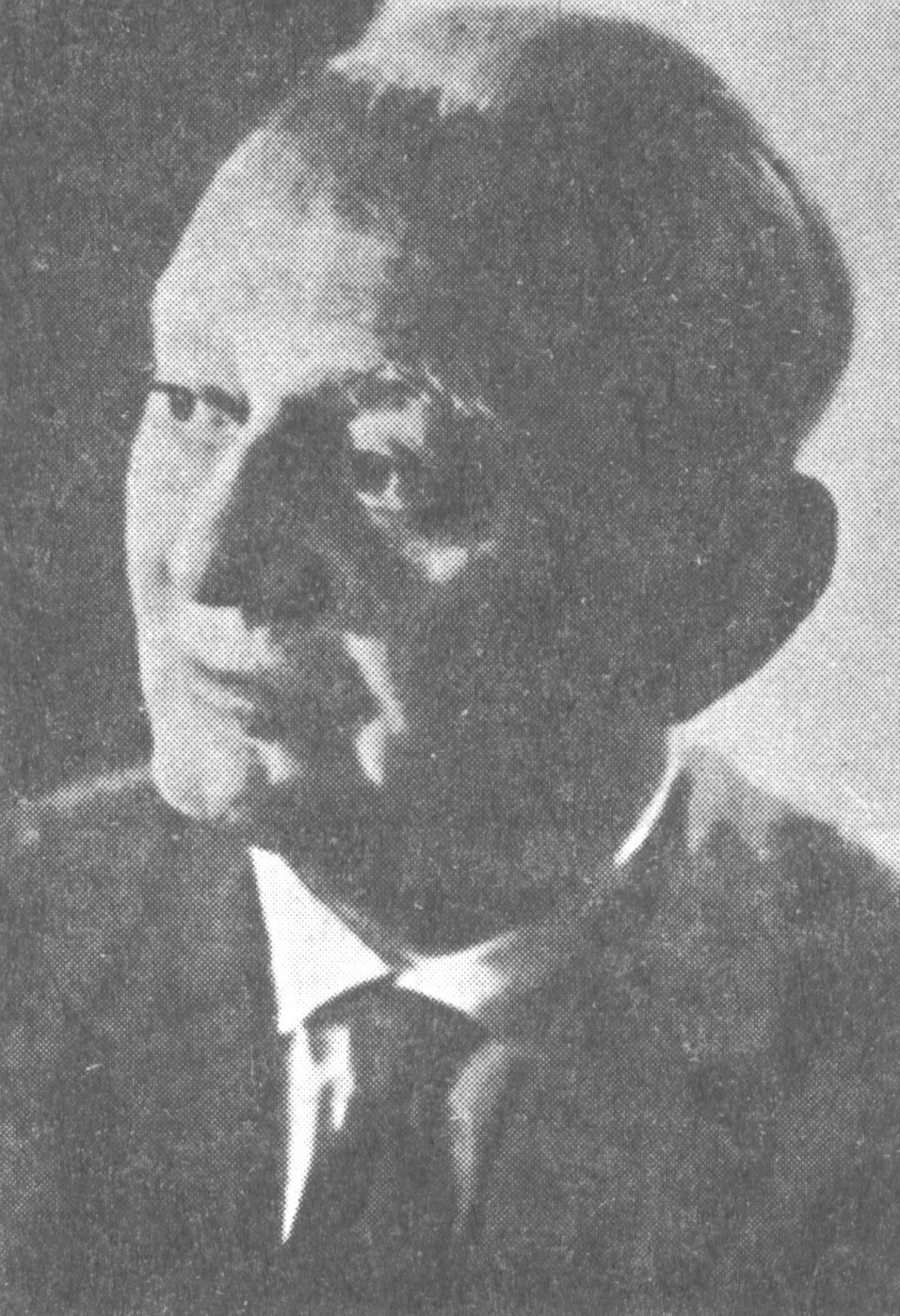
- Rohlfs (c. 1959)
- Born: 14 July 1892; Berlin, German Empire
- Died: 12 September 1986 (aged 94); Tübingen, West Germany

Gerhard Rohlfs (July 14, 1892 – September 12, 1986) was a German linguist. He taught Romance languages and literature at the University of Tübingen and the Ludwig-Maximilians-Universität München. He was described as an "archeologist of words".

== Biography ==
Rohlfs was born in Lichterfelde in Berlin. His main interest was the languages and dialects spoken in Southern Italy and he traveled extensively in this region. He studied Italiot Greek (a language still spoken in a few places in Salento, southern Apulia, and in Bovesia, southern Calabria) and found several indications suggesting that Italiot-Greek is a direct descendant of the language originally spoken by the Greek colonists of Magna Grecia. He first advanced this theory in his book Griechen und Romanen in Unteritalien (Greeks and Romans in Southern Italy, 1924). He also published two complete vocabularies of the dialects of Bovesia (1938–1939) and Salento (1956–1961).

His main work is considered to be his Historical Grammar of the Italian Language and its Dialects (Historische Grammatik der italienischen Sprache und ihrer Mundarten, 1949–1954). He received honorary degrees from the University of Calabria in Cosenza and the University of Salento in Lecce. He died in Tübingen.

== Selected works ==
- Romanische Sprachgeographie: Geschichte und Grundlagen, Aspekte und Probleme mit dem Versuch eines Sprachatlas der romanischen Sprachen. C. H. Beck, München 1971.
- Historische Grammatik der italienischen Sprache und ihrer Mundarten, 3 Bände, Francke, Bern 1949–1954; Neubearb. unter dem Titel Grammatica storica della lingua italiana e dei suoi dialetti, 3 Bde., Einaudi, Turin 1966–1969 und mehrere Nachdrucke.
- Vocabolario dei dialetti salentini (Terra d'Otranto). Verlag der Bayer. Akad. d. Wiss., München, 2 volumes (1956-1957) and 1 supplement (1961) - reprinted by Congedo Editore, (Galatina) in 1976.
- Rätoromanisch. Die Sonderstellung des Rätoromanischen zwischen Italienisch und Französisch; eine kulturgeschichtliche und linguistische Einführung. C. H. Beck, München 1975, ISBN 3-406-05730-6.
- Le Gascon. Etudes de philologie pyrénéenne. Editions Marrimpouey Jeune, Pau & Niemeyer, Tübingen 1977.
- Sermo vulgaris Latinus. Vulgärlateinisches Lesebuch. Niemeyer, Tübingen 1951 (Sammlung kurzer Lehrbücher der romanischen Sprachen und Literaturen; Band 13).
- Lexicon graecanicum Italiae inferioris. 2., erw. u. völlig neubearb. Aufl. Niemeyer, Tübingen 1964 (1. Aufl. u.d.T.: Etymologisches Wörterbuch der unteritalienischen Gräzität).
- Nuovo dizionario dialettale della Calabria. Con repertorio italo-calabro. Nuova ed. interamente rielab., ampl. ed aggiornata, 3. rist. Longo Ravenna 1982.
- Soprannomi siciliani. Palermo 1984 (Centro di Studi Filologici e Linguistici Siciliani. Lessici siciliani; Band 2).
- Gerhard Rohlfs - La Calabria contadina - Scavo linguistico e fotografie del primo Novecento, a cura di/Hrsg. Antonio Panzarella, Edizioni Scientifiche Calabresi, Rende 2006, ISBN 88-89464-10-0 (Bildband mit Fotos, die Rohlfs aufgenommenen und sprachwissenschaftlich kommentiert hat).
- Primitive Kuppelbauten in Europa. BAdW. Beck'sche Verlagsbuchhandlung München 1957 (it. Ausg. Primitive costruzioni a cupola in Europa, Firenze 1963)
