= Sergio Vuskovic =

Chilean politician (1930–2021)

Mayor of Valparaíso
- In office 3 November 1970 – 11 September 1973
- President: Salvador Allende
- Preceded by: Alfonso Ansieta Núñez
- Succeeded by: Matías Valenzuela Labra

Personal details
- Born: Abraham Sergio Vuskovic Rojo; 19 October 1930 Illapel, Chile
- Died: 19 August 2021 (aged 90)
- Occupation: Politician; professor; writer

Abraham Sergio Vuskovic Rojo (19 October 1930 – 19 August 2021), generally known as Sergio Vuskovic, was a Chilean politician, professor and writer. He was the mayor of Valparaíso from 1970 to 1973.

Vuskovic was born in Illapel. During the government of the Unidad Popular, he was appointed Mayor of the city of Valparaíso. After the coup of 1973, he was arrested and tortured in La Esmeralda. Later he was taken to Dawson Island, where he remained for eight months.

In 1988 he was granted the Cittadinanza Onoraria of the city of Martignano, Province of Lecce, Italy.

== Books ==
- La base material del pensamiento, 1958
- Investigaciones sobre el origen del pensamiento, 1961
- Diálogo con la Democracia Cristiana, 1964
- Teoría de la ambigüedad, 1964
- Revolución, Estado, Propiedad: problemática demócrata cristiana, 1967
- Un filósofo llamado Lenin, 1971
- El proceso revolucionario chileno, 1973
- Del stalinismo a la perestroika, 1991
- Breviario de Platón, 1998
