= Aramirè =

Aramirè is music group from Salento, Italy, specializing in various forms of local traditional music:

- The pizzica version of the Tarantella,
- songs of the Grecìa Salentina region,
- traditional love songs,
- and polyphonic songs of love and labour.

The group was formed in 1996 by members of the defunct group Canzoniere di Terra d'Otranto, who in the late 1950s began studying and restoring local traditional music. Of the three founders, Luigi Chiriatti, Roberto Raheli and Sandro Girasoli, only Raheli remains in 2004, as a result of a divergence on the commercial drift of folk music.

They gave an illustrious concert at Carnegie Hall in New York in January 2007.

== See also ==
- Ghetonia
