= Sternatia =

Sternatia Χώρα/Chòra (Griko)
- Comune
- Comune di Sternatia
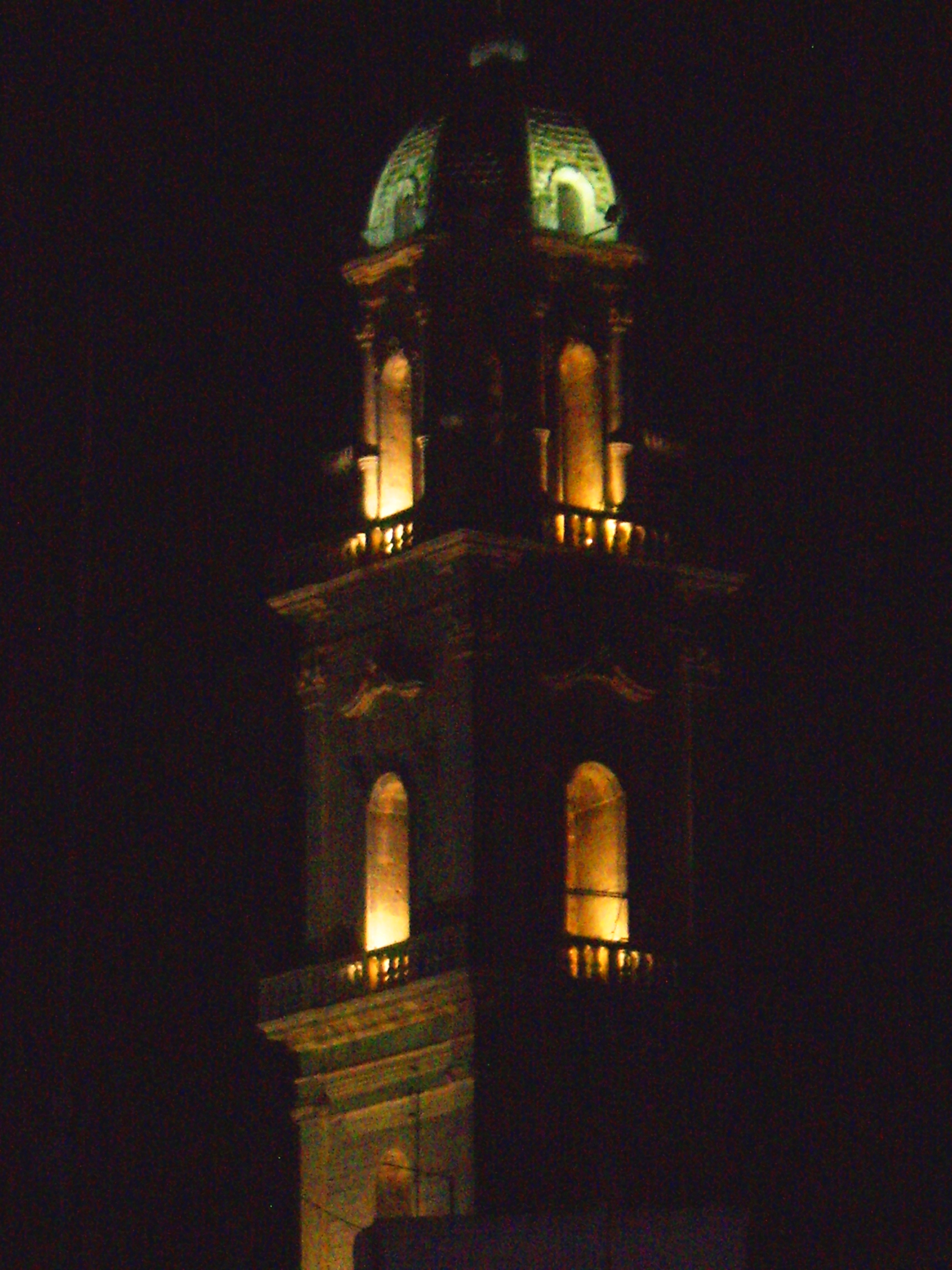

- Coat of arms

- Location within Italy Location within Apulia
- Coordinates: 40°13′N 18°14′E
- Country: Italy
- Region: Apulia
- Province: Lecce (LE)
- Frazioni: Caprarica di Lecce, Martignano, San Donato di Lecce, Soleto, Zollino

Government
  - Mayor: Pantaleo Conte

Area
  - Total: 16 km^{2} (6.2 sq mi)
- Elevation: 73 m (240 ft)

Population (November 2008)
  - Total: 2,496
  - Density: 160/km^{2} (400/sq mi)
- Demonym: Sternatesi
- Time zone: UTC+1 (CET)
  - Summer (DST): UTC+2 (CEST)
- Postal code: 73010
- Dialing code: 0836
- ISTAT code: 075080
- Patron saint: St. George
- Saint day: 22 August
- Website: comune.sternatia.le.it

Sternatia (Griko: Χώρα, translit. Chòra) is a small town and comune in the province of Lecce, Apulia, southern Italy. It is one of the nine towns of Grecìa Salentina where the greek dialect Griko is spoken.
