= Maglie =

Maglie Maje Μάλιαι
- Comune
- Città di Maglie
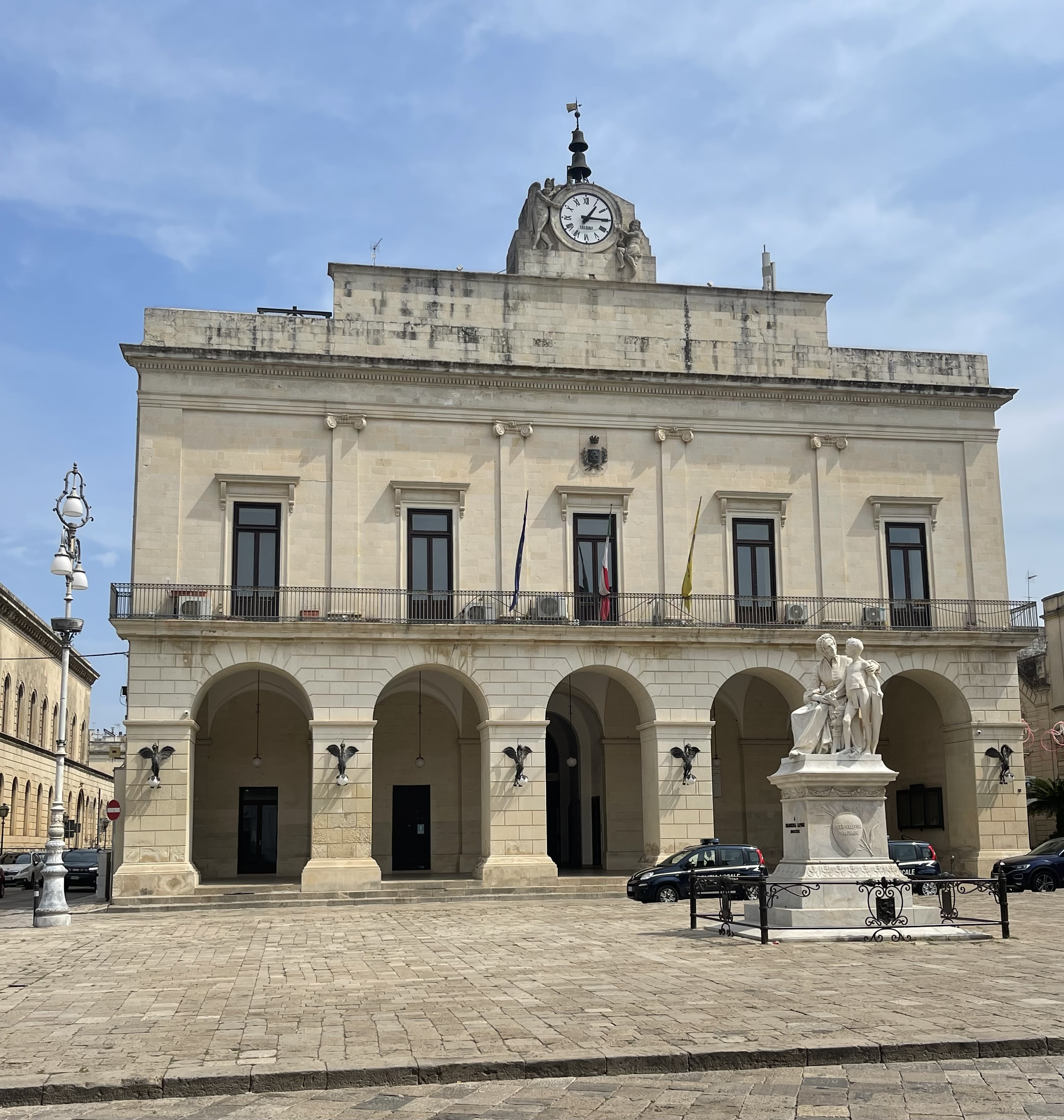
- Piazza Aldo Moro

- Coat of arms

- Location within Italy Location within Apulia
- Coordinates: 40°7′N 18°8′E
- Country: Italy
- Region: Apulia
- Province: Lecce (LE)
- Frazioni: Morigino

Government
  - Mayor: Ernesto Toma

Area
  - Total: 22.66 km^{2} (8.75 sq mi)
- Elevation: 81 m (266 ft)

Population (1 January 2018)
  - Total: 14,196
  - Density: 626.5/km^{2} (1,623/sq mi)
- Demonym: Magliesi
- Time zone: UTC+1 (CET)
  - Summer (DST): UTC+2 (CEST)
- Postal code: 73024
- Dialing code: 0836
- ISTAT code: 075039
- Patron saint: Nicholas of Bari
- Saint day: 9 May
- Website: Official website

Maglie (Salentino: Maje; Griko: Μάλιαι; Latin: Mallae) is a town and comune (municipality) in the province of Lecce in the Apulia region of southeast Italy.

== History ==
The Maglie area was settled as early as the Bronze Age and the early Iron Age, and before, as testified by the presence of archaic dolmens and menhirs, and by the Cattìe site, discovered in 1980, and featuring 12,000 tools and 800 bone remains.

Maglie, initially a countryside casale, developed around the castle built in the 13th century, probably under the Angevine kings of Naples and later renewed by Andriolo Lubello, the local baron under king Alfonso I of Aragon.

== Main sights ==
- Duomo (Cathedral, also called Chiesa Collegiata). It was built in the late 18th century on the site of two previous buildings tracing back to 14th and 16th century. Its bell tower (1686–90), standing at about 48 metres (157 ft), is the tallest in the province. The four upper storeys are attributed to Giuseppe Zimbalo.
- Church of Madonna delle Grazie, in Baroque style (early 16th century). The interior has a 1645 Baroque altar and 17th century canvasses. It also features a column, similar to the Lecce's Column of St. Oronzo by Zimbalo, built in 1684–87.
- Church of Madonna Addolorata (18th century)
- Palazzo Baronale

== Economy ==
Maglie's economy is based on commerce, craftmanship (especially of local stone), and tourism.

== Demographics ==
Population development since 1861:

Historical population
Year	Pop.	±%
1861	5,202	—
1871	5,750	+10.5%
1881	6,663	+15.9%
1901	8,664	+30.0%
1911	9,484	+9.5%
1921	11,047	+16.5%
1931	10,542	−4.6%
1936	11,279	+7.0%
1951	12,737	+12.9%
1961	13,028	+2.3%
1971	13,657	+4.8%
1981	15,198	+11.3%
1991	15,223	+0.2%
2001	15,255	+0.2%
2011	14,819	−2.9%
2020	13,893	−6.2%

Migrant communities in Maglie with more than ten people 01.01.2020:

Romania	127
Albania	51
China	21
Philippines	19
India	16
Poland	15
Senegal	15
Morocco	13
Afghanistan	12
Nigeria	11

== Transportation ==
Maglie is served by the Ferrovie Sud Est Zollino-Gagliano and Maglie-Otranto lines.

It is crossed by two state roads, the SS16 Adriatica Lecce-Maglie-Otranto, and the SS275 from Santa Maria di Leuca.

== Notable people ==
- Aldo Moro (1916–1978), politician
- Raffaele Fitto (born 1969), politician
