= Griko language =

Dialect of Italiot Greek

Griko
- Γκρίκο
- Native to: Italy
- Region: Salento
- Ethnicity: Griko people
- Native speakers: (20,000 cited 1981); 40,000 to 50,000 L2 speakers
- Language family: Indo-European: Hellenic; Greek; (disputed); Attic–Ionic; Attic; Koine; Italiot; Griko
- Writing system: Greek alphabet, Latin alphabet

Official status
- Recognised minority language in: Italy: Apulia

Language codes
- ISO 639-3: –
- Glottolog: apul1237 Apulian Greek
- ELP: Griko
- Linguasphere: 56-AAA-aia
- IETF: el-u-sd-it75
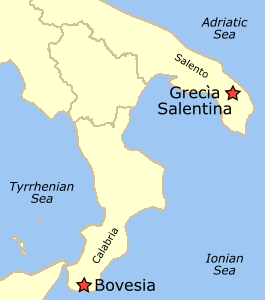
- Location map of the Italiot-speaking areas in Salento and Calabria

Griko (endonym: Griko/Γκρίκο), sometimes spelled Grico, is one of the two dialects of Italiot Greek (the other being Calabrian Greek or Grecanico), spoken by Griko people in Salento, province of Lecce, Italy. Some Greek linguists consider it to be a Modern Greek dialect and often call it Katoitaliótika (Greek: Κατωιταλιώτικα, lit. 'Southern Italian') or Grekanika (Γραικάνικα). Griko and Standard Modern Greek are partially mutually intelligible.

== Classification ==
The most popular hypothesis on the origin of Griko is the one by Gerhard Rohlfs and Georgios Hatzidakis, that Griko's roots go as far back in history as the time of the ancient Greek colonies in Southern Italy and Sicily in the eighth century BC. The Southern Italian dialect is thus considered to be the last living trace of the Greek elements that once formed Magna Graecia.

There are, however, competing hypotheses according to which Griko may have preserved some Doric elements, but its structure is otherwise mostly based on Koine Greek, like almost all other Modern Greek dialects. Thus, Griko should rather be described as a Doric-influenced descendant of Medieval Greek spoken by those who fled the Byzantine Empire to Italy to escape the Turks. The idea of Southern Italy's Greek dialects being historically derived from Medieval Greek was proposed for the first time in the 19th century by Giuseppe Morosi.

== Geographic distribution ==
Two small Italiot Greek-speaking communities survive today in the Italian regions of Calabria (Metropolitan city of Reggio Calabria) and Apulia (Province of Lecce).

The Italiot Greek-speaking area of Apulia is called Grecìa Salentina and includes seven villages where Griko is still spoken – Calimera, Castrignano dei Greci, Corigliano d’Otranto, Martano, Martignano, Sternatia and Zollino – in addition to four villages – Carpignano Salentino, Cutrofiano, Melpignano and Soleto – where Griko has not been spoken for one or two centuries. The total population of Grecia Salentina is around 40,000.

The Calabrian Greek region also consists of nine villages in Bovesia, (including Bova Superiore, Roghudi, Gallicianò, Chorìo di Roghudi and Bova Marina) and four districts in the city of Reggio Calabria, but its population is significantly smaller, with around only 2000 inhabitants.

== Official status ==
By Law 482 of 1999, the Italian parliament recognized the Griko communities of Reggio Calabria and Salento as a Greek ethnic and linguistic minority. It states that the Republic protects the language and culture of its Albanian, Catalan, Germanic, Greek, Slovene and Croat populations and of those who speak French, Franco-Provençal, Friulian, Ladin, Occitan and Sardinian. According to UNESCO data from 2011, the two dialects of Griko are classified as severely endangered languages.

== Culture ==
There is rich oral tradition and Griko folklore. Griko songs, music and poetry are particularly popular in Italy and Greece. Famous music groups from Salento include Ghetonia, Aramirè, and Canzoniere Grecanico Salentino. Also, influential Greek artists such as Dionysis Savvopoulos and Maria Farantouri have performed in Griko. The Greek musical ensemble Encardia focuses on Griko songs as well as on the musical tradition of Southern Italy at large.

=== Samples ===
Sample text from Καληνύφτα – Kalinifta ("Good night") and Andramu pai, popular Griko songs:

| Griko | Modern Greek | English translation |
|---|---|---|
| Καληνύφτα | Καληνύχτα | Good night |
| Εβώ πάντα σε σένα πενσέω, γιατί σένα φσυχή μου 'γαπώ, τσαι που πάω, που σύρνω, που στέω στην καρδία, μου πάντα σένα βαστῶ. | Εγώ πάντα εσένα σκέφτομαι, γιατί εσένα ψυχή μου αγαπώ, και όπου πάω, όπου σέρνομαι, όπου στέκομαι, στην καρδιά μου πάντα εσένα βαστώ. | I always think of you because I love you, my soul, and wherever I go, wherever I drag myself to, wherever I stand, inside my heart I always hold you. |
| [eˈvo ˈpanta se ˈsena penˈseo jaˈti ˈsena fsiˈhi mu ɣaˈpo tɕe pu ˈpao pu ˈsirno pu ˈsteo stin karˈdia mu ˈpanta ˈsena vasˈto] | [eˈɣo ˈpanda eˈsena ˈsceftome ʝaˈti eˈsena psiˈçi mu aɣaˈpo ce ˈopu ˈpao ˈopu ˈserno[me] ˈopu ˈsteko[me] stin ɡarˈðʝa mu ˈpanda eˈsena vaˈsto] | ... |

| Griko | Modern Greek | English translation |
|---|---|---|
| Ἄνδρα μοῦ πάει – Andramu pai | Ὁ ἄνδρας μοῦ πάει – O andras mou pai | My husband is gone |
| Στὲ κούω τὴ μπάντα τσαὶ στὲ κούω ἦττο σόνο Στέω ἐττοῦ μα 'σα τσαὶ στὲ πένσεω στὸ τρένο Πένσεω στὸ σκοτεινό τσαὶ ἤττη μινιέρα ποῦ πολεμώντα ἐτσεί πεσαίνει ὁ γένο! | Ἀκούω τὴν μπάντα, ἀκούω τὴ μουσική Εἶμαι ἐδὼ μαζί σας μὰ σκέφτομαι τὸ τρένο Σκέφτομαι τὸ σκοτάδι καὶ τὸ ὀρυχεῖο ὅπου δουλεύοντας πεθαίνει ὁ κόσμος! | I hear the band, I hear the music I'm here with you but I think of the train I think of darkness and the mine where people work and die! |
| Ste 'kuo ti 'baⁿda ce ste kuo itto sono, steo et'tu ma sa ce ste 'penseo sto 'treno, penseo sto skotinò citti miniera pu polemònta ecì peseni o jeno! | Akuo ti banda, akuo ti musiki ime edho mazi sas ma skeftome to treno skeftome to skotadhi kai to orihio opu doulevontas petheni o kosmos! | ... |

== Phonology ==
Consonants
| | Labial | Dental/Alveolar | Post-alveolar | Velar |
|---|---|---|---|---|
| Stop | p b | t d | ɖ | k ɡ |
| Affricate | | ts dz | tʃ dʒ | |
| Fricative | f v | s (z) | ʃ | x |
| Nasal | m | n | ɲ | |
| Trill | | r | | |
| Approximant | | l | j | |

- Nasal+stop clusters [ᵐb, ⁿd, ᵑɡ] along with voiceless equivalents [ᵐp, ⁿt, ᵑk] also are heard.
- The cacuminal /ɖ/ may also be realized as an affricate [ɖːʐ], and consonant sequences /tr/ and /tːr/ may be pronounced as [ʈʂ] and [ʈːʂ] among speakers.
- [z] is heard as a realization of /s/ when before a voiced consonant.
- A few cases of a palatal lateral [ʎ] can be heard, possibly as a result of the influence of Standard Italian.

Vowels
| | Front | Central | Back |
|---|---|---|---|
| High | i | | u |
| Mid | ɛ | | ɔ |
| Low | | a | |

- Vowels /i, u/ are heard as homorganic glides [j, w] when following consonants and preceding other vowels.

== Grammar ==
In many aspects, its grammar is similar to that of Modern Greek. The language has three genders, masculine, feminine, and neuter. All nouns and adjectives are declined according to number and case. There are four cases, just like in Modern Greek: nominative, genitive, accusative, and vocative. Verbs are conjugated according to person, number, tense, mood, and aspect. The table below shows the personal pronouns of the Griko language:

| Personal pronouns | 1st person | | 2nd person | | 3rd person | |
| Personal pronouns | Singular | Plural | Singular | Plural | Singular | Plural |
|---|---|---|---|---|---|---|
| Nominative | evò | emì | esù | esì | (e)cino, (e)cini, (e)cino | (e)cini, (e)cine, (e)cina |
| Genitive | mu | ma, mas | su | esà(s), sa | (e)cinù, (e)cinì, (e)cinù | (e)cinò |
| Accusative | me, emena | ma, mas | esea, sea | esà(s), sa | (e)cino, (e)cini, (e)cino | (e)cinu, (e)cine, (e)cina |

== See also ==
- Hellenic languages
- Calabrian Greek dialect
- Griko people
- Magna Graecia
- Byzantine Italy
