= Grecìa Salentina =

Grecìa Salentina Ελλάδα του Σαλέντο/ Σαλαντινή Ελλάδα (Greek)
- Region
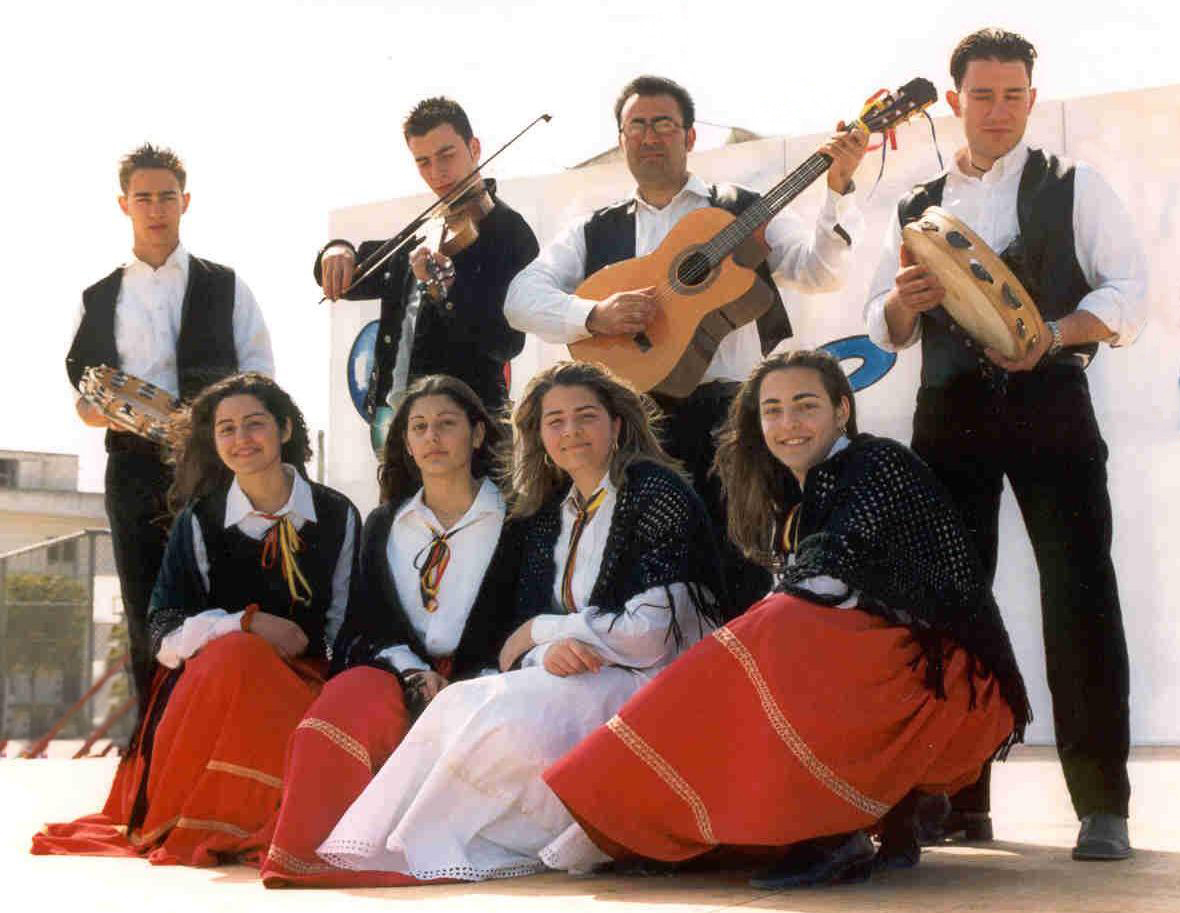
- Grico cultural group of Salento, Puglia

- Location within Italy
- Coordinates: 40°21′N 18°10′E
- Country: Italy
- Region: Apulia
- Geographic region: Salento
- Population: 54,278 (2005)

Government
  - Type: Union of the Towns of Grecìa Salentina
  - President: Casaluci Roberto
  - Vice President: Tarantino Fabio
- Demonym(s): Italian: Griko; Greek: Γκρίκο
- Time zone: UTC+1
  - Summer (DST): UTC+2
- Postal codes: 73001-73100, 72012-72015, 72017-72018, 72020-72027, 72029, 74100
- Website: www.unionegreciasalentina.le.it

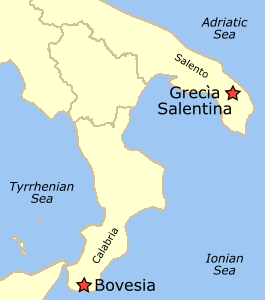
Location map of the Griko-speaking areas Grecìa Salentina and Bovesia

Map of the municipalities belonging to the Grecìa Salentina within the Province of Lecce

Grecìa Salentina (Griko for "Salentine Greece") is an area in the peninsula of Salento in southern Italy, near the town of Lecce which is inhabited by the Griko people, an ethnic Greek minority in southern Italy who speak Griko, a variant of Greek.

== Overview ==
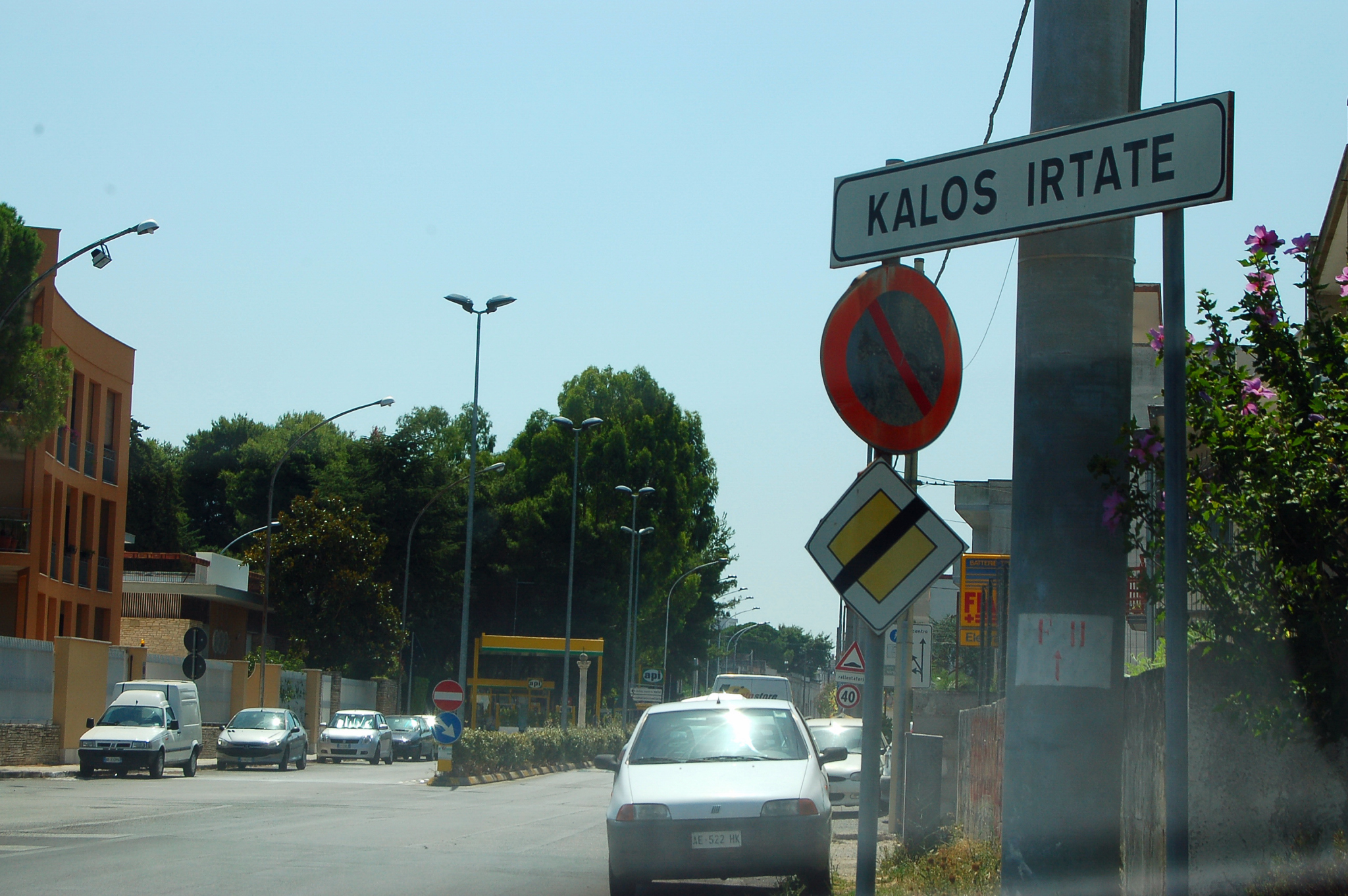
Sign in Griko dialect in Calimera, Puglia

The Union of the Towns of Grecìa Salentina (Unione dei Comuni della Grecìa Salentina) consists of eleven towns and forms part of the province of Lecce in the administrative area of Apulia (Puglia), and was founded by the Griko population in 1966. The purpose of this union was to promote the knowledge of Griko and preserve its culture, by organizing research at the university, teaching the language at schools and publishing books and poetry in the endangered dialect.

The following towns are members of the Union: Calimera, Martano, Castrignano dei Greci, Corigliano d'Otranto, Melpignano, Soleto, Sternatia, Zollino, Martignano, Carpignano Salentino and Cutrofiano. Carpignano Salentino and Cutrofiano joined the Union in 2007, though the inhabitants of these two towns have not spoken Griko for two centuries.

== Demographics ==
Town	Inhabitants
Martano	9,588
Carpignano Salentino	3,868
Castrignano de' Greci	4,164
Corigliano d'Otranto	5,762
Cutrofiano	9,250
Calimera	7,351
Martignano	1,784
Melpignano	2,234
Soleto	5,551
Sternatia	2,583
Zollino	2,143
Total	54,278

== Sports ==
Since 2020, the Grecia Salentina Marathon has been organized every year and the route starts in Piazza del Sole, in the heart of Calimera, while passing through 9 more municipalities of Grecia Salentina. In 2023, the football team AEK CROTONE (formerly Real Fondo Gesù) was founded in Crotone. The name and colors of the team refer to AEK of Athens. In 2014, the football club HELLAS TARANTO was founded in Taranto.

== See also ==
- Griko people
- Magna Graecia
- Catepanate of Italy
