= Calimera =

Comune in Apulia, Italy

Calimera Καλημέρα/Kalimèra (Griko)
- Comune
- Comune di Calimera
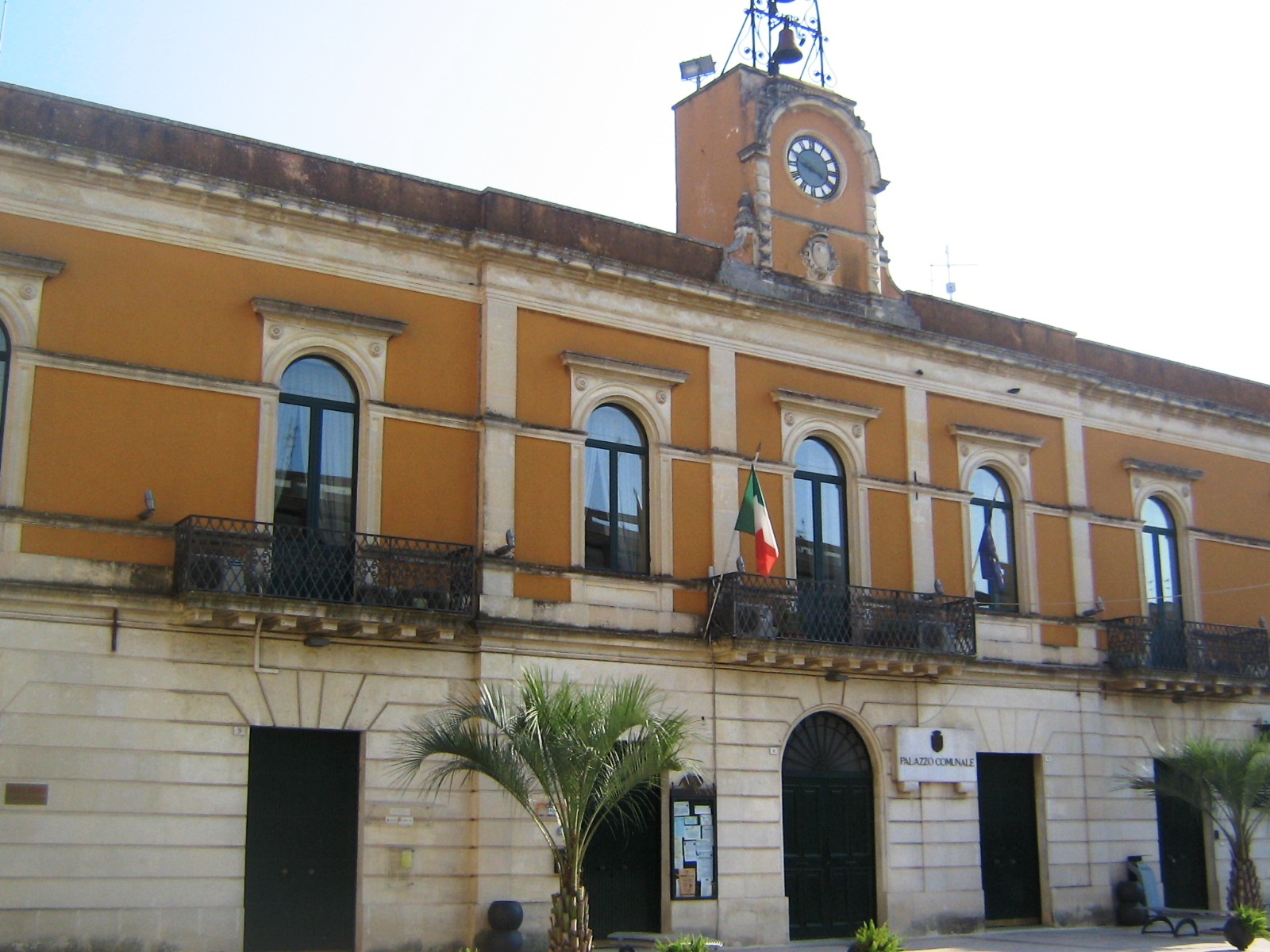
- Town hall

- Coat of arms

- Location of Calimera in Italy Calimera (Apulia)
- Coordinates: 40°15′N 18°17′E
- Country: Italy
- Region: Apulia
- Province: Province of Lecce (LE)

Government
  - Mayor: Gianluca Tommasi from 21-9-2020

Area
  - Total: 11.14 km^{2} (4.30 sq mi)
- Elevation: 56 m (184 ft)

Population (31 December 2021)
  - Total: 6,753
  - Density: 606.2/km^{2} (1,570/sq mi)
- Demonym: Calimeresi
- Time zone: UTC+1 (CET)
  - Summer (DST): UTC+2 (CEST)
- Postal code: 73021
- Dialing code: 0832
- ISTAT code: 075010
- Patron saint: Saints Brizio and Maria di Roca
- Saint day: 29 July
- Website: Official website

Calimera (Griko: Καλημέρα lit. "good morning") is a small town of 6,753 inhabitants (2021) in the Grecìa Salentina area of the Salento peninsula in Italy, located between Gallipoli and Otranto. It belongs to the province of Lecce.

The inhabitants of Calimera, alongside Italian, also speak Griko, a Greek dialect. The language, folklore, traditions and history of Calimera, like those of the eight other cities in the area called "Salentine Greece", reveal significant Greek influences over the course of time, presumably from the time of the Byzantine control, or even the ancient Magna Graecia colonisation in the 8th century BCE.

In the park, there is a small monument containing an ancient Attic burial stone, given by the city of Athens to Calimera in 1960. At the top of this monument is a motto, referring to the burial stone: "Zeni su en ise ettù sti Kalimera" (in Greek script: Τσένη 'σού 'εν είσαι ετού στη Καλημέρα), meaning "You are not a stranger here in Calimera", which underlines the close relationship and common origins of Calimera with the rest of Greek civilisation.

== Legend of the city's name ==
The story of the city's name starts when immigrants from Greece first arrived and settled in the commune. An Italian stranger visiting from a nearby city asked a Greek-speaking local what the name of the town was. The Greek man didn't understand what the Italian was asking him, so replied with the Greek greeting "Calimera" ("good morning"), which the Italian thought was the name of the town.

== See also ==
- Magna Graecia
- Griko people
- Griko language
- Greeks in Italy
- Ghetonia
