= Corigliano d'Otranto =

Corigliano d'Otranto Χωριάνα/Choriàna (Griko) Coriànu (Salentino) Curiànu (Sicilian)
- Comune
- Comune di Corigliano d'Otranto
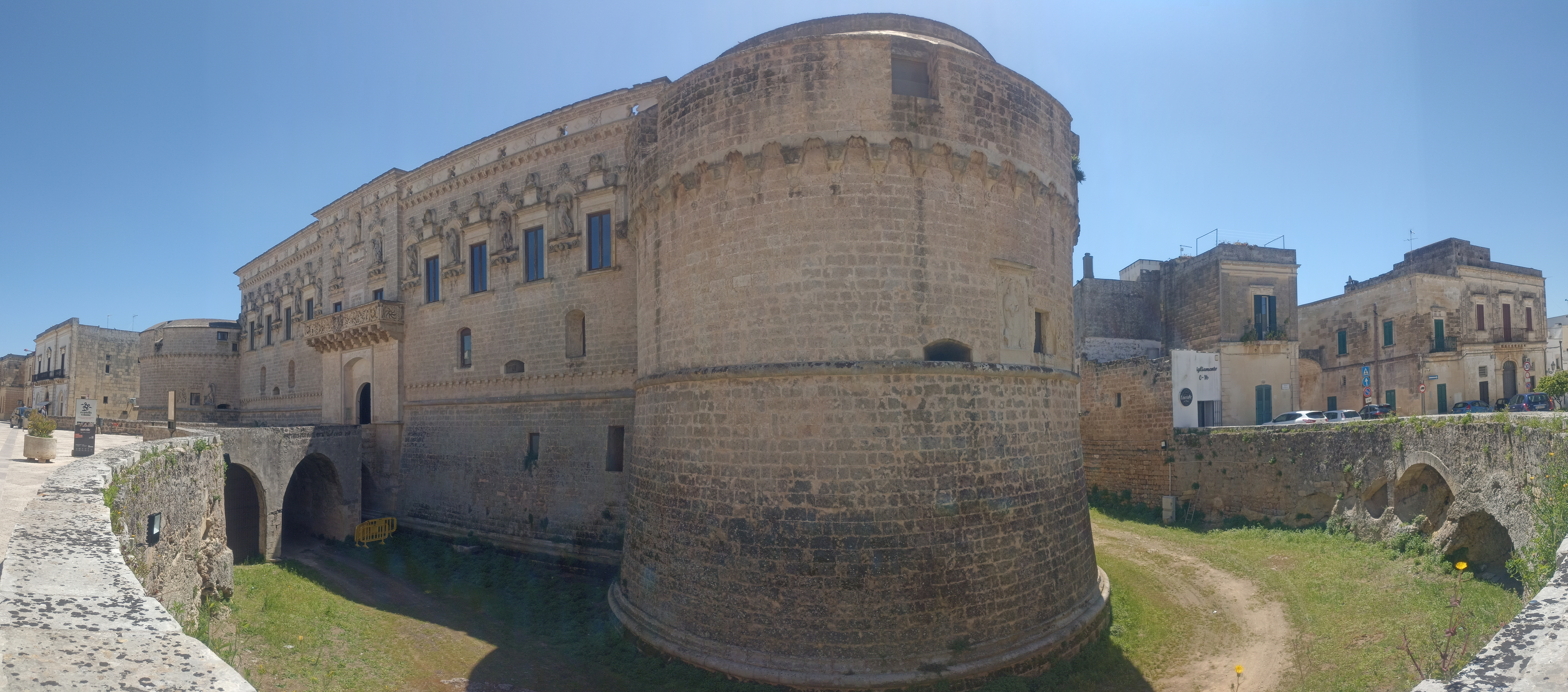
- De' Monti Castle

- Coat of arms

- Location within Italy Location within Apulia
- Coordinates: 40°10′N 18°15′E
- Country: Italy
- Region: Apulia
- Province: Province of Lecce (LE)

Area
  - Total: 28 km^{2} (11 sq mi)
- Elevation: 76 m (249 ft)

Population (2018-01-01)
  - Total: 5,632
  - Density: 200/km^{2} (520/sq mi)
- Demonym: Coriglianesi
- Time zone: UTC+1 (CET)
  - Summer (DST): UTC+2 (CEST)
- Postal code: 73022
- Dialing code: 0836
- ISTAT code: 075023
- Patron saint: St. Nicola di Bari
- Website: Official website

Corigliano d'Otranto (Griko: Χωριάνα, romanized: Choriàna; Salentino: Coriànu) is a small town and comune of 5,632 inhabitants in the province of Lecce in Apulia, Italy. It is one of the nine towns of Grecìa Salentina. The inhabitants of Corigliano, alongside Italian, also speak Griko, a Greek dialect.

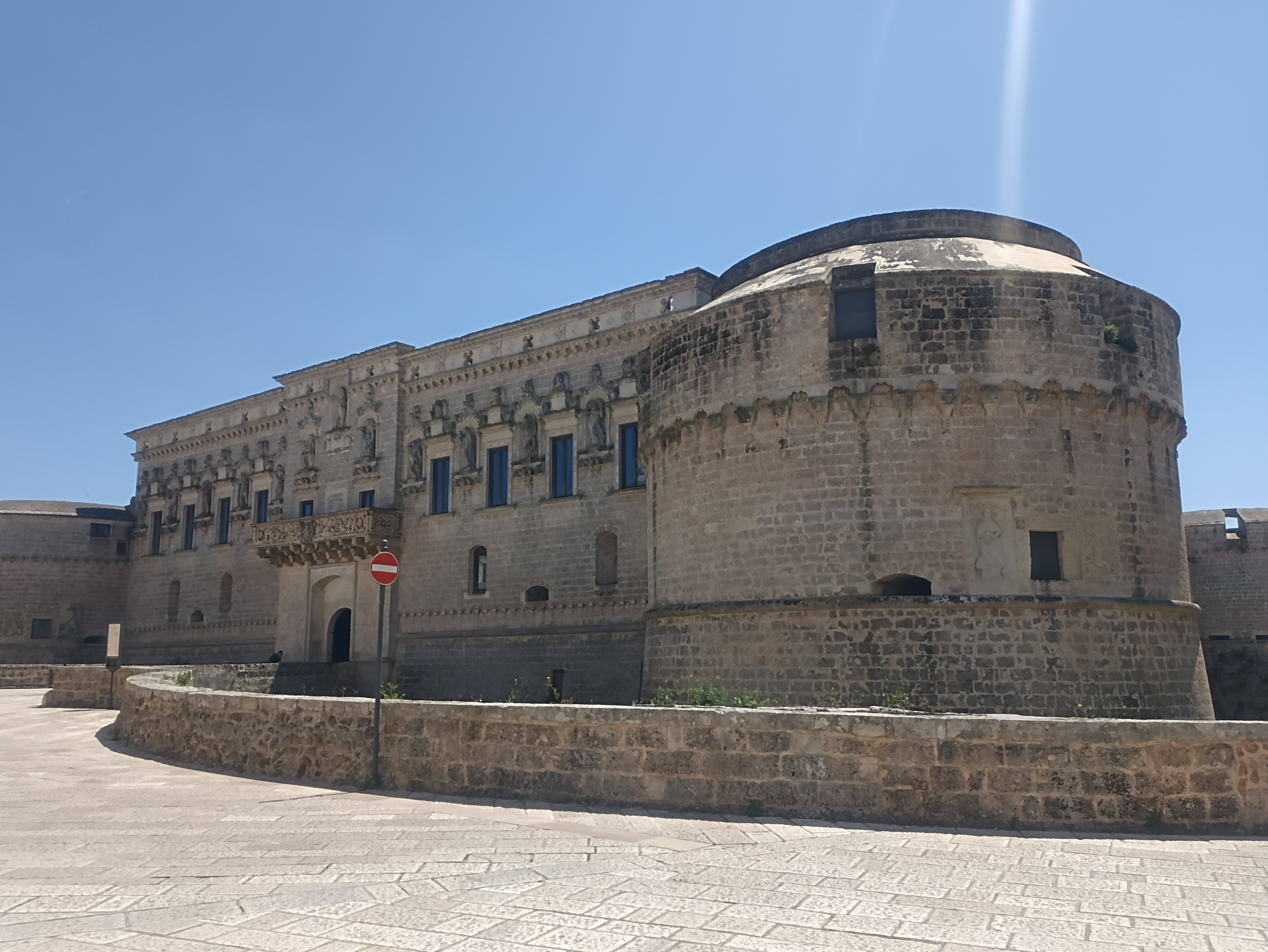
De' Monti Castle

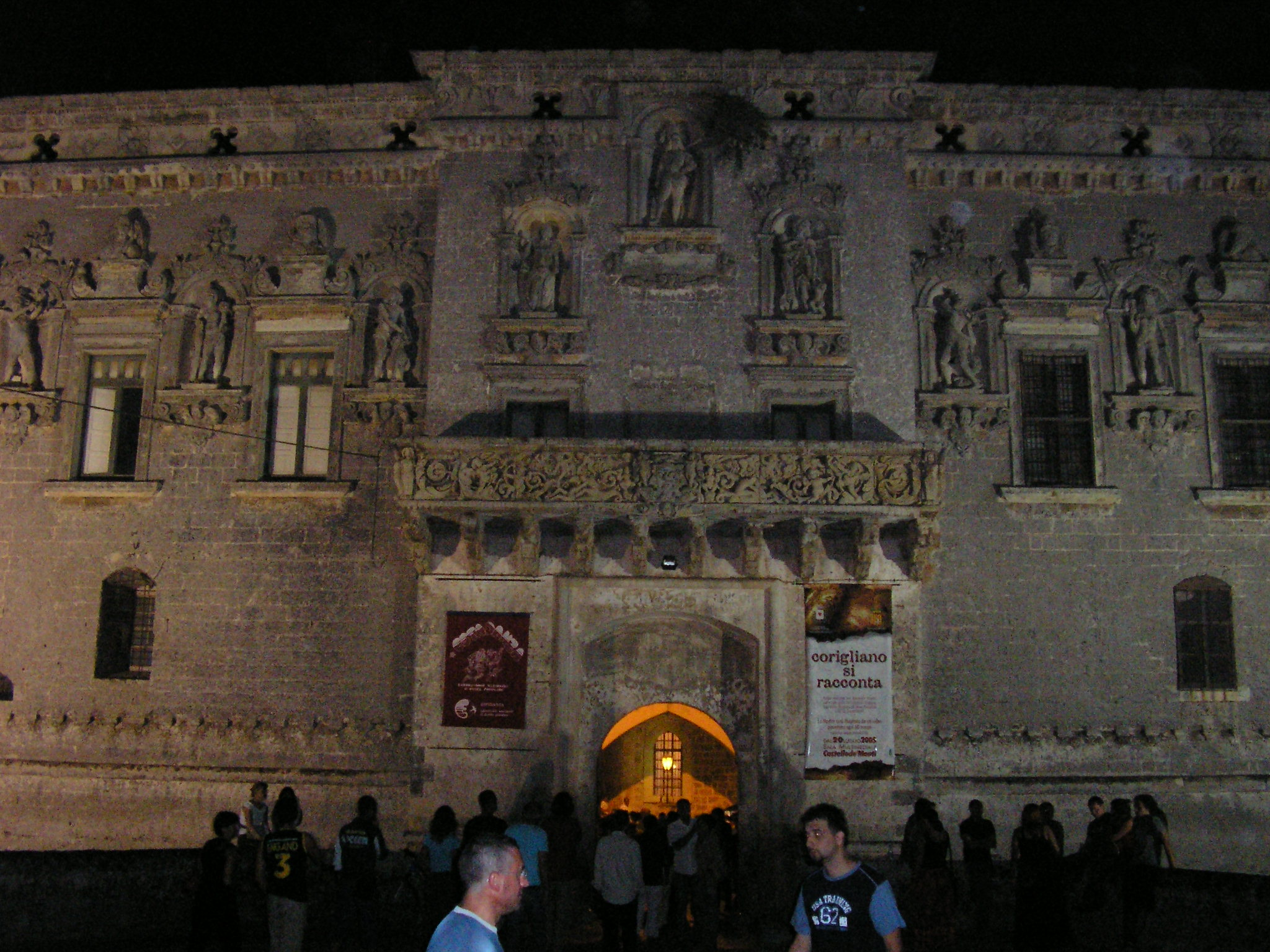
De' Monti Castle

== Sister cities ==
- Ilion, Greece

== Notable people ==
- Eliseo Donno, racing driver
