= Martano =

Martano Μαρτάνα/Martána (Griko) Martanu (Salentino)
- Comune
- Comune di Martano
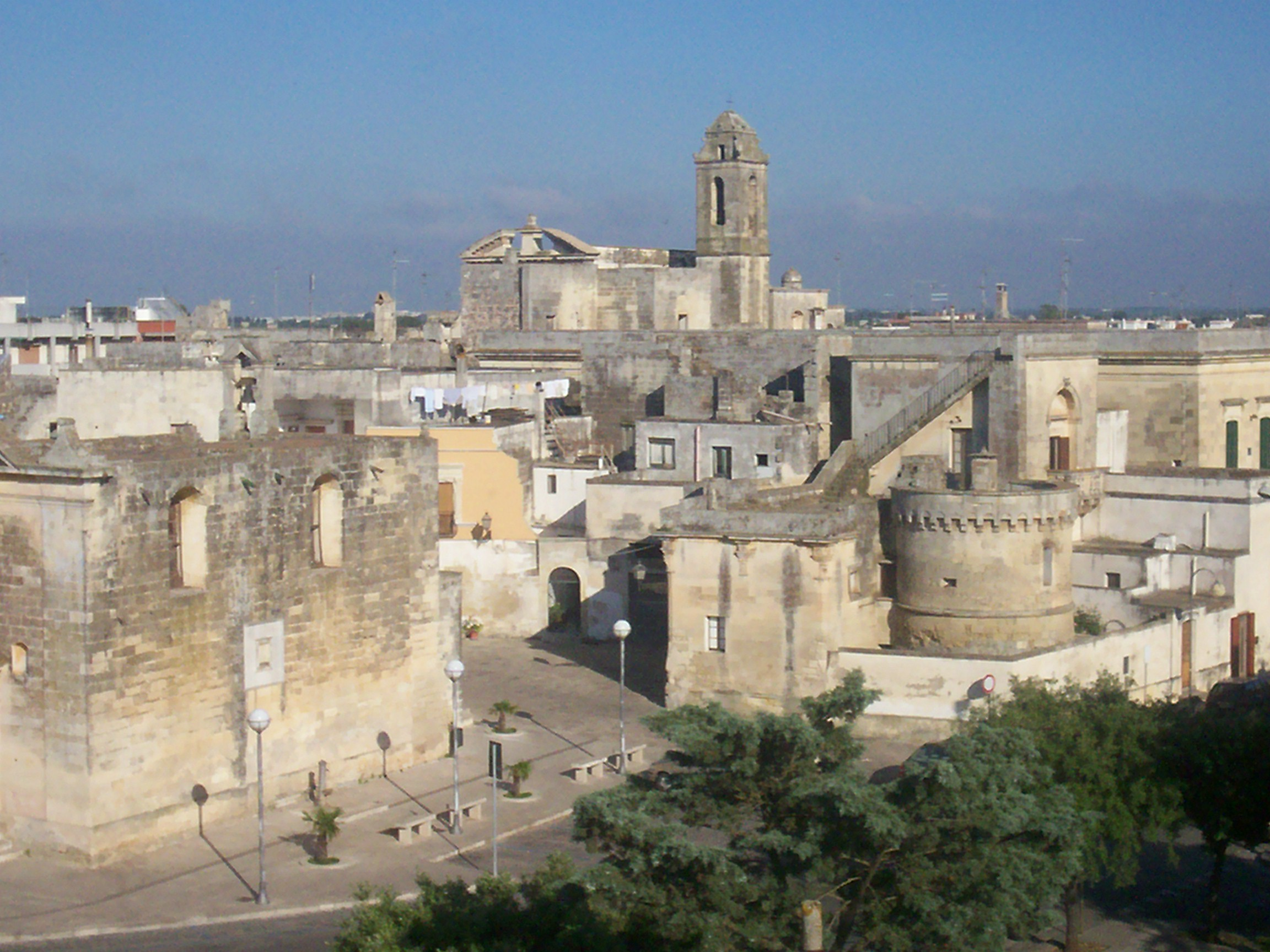
- The old city

- Location within Italy Location within Apulia
- Coordinates: 40°12′N 18°18′E
- Country: Italy
- Region: Apulia
- Province: Lecce (LE)
- Frazioni: None

Government
  - Mayor: Fabio Tarantino

Area
  - Total: 21 km^{2} (8.1 sq mi)
- Elevation: 92 m (302 ft)

Population (December 31, 2004)
  - Total: 9,573
  - Density: 460/km^{2} (1,200/sq mi)
- Demonym: Martanesi
- Time zone: UTC+1 (CET)
  - Summer (DST): UTC+2 (CEST)
- Postal code: 73025
- Dialing code: 0836
- ISTAT code: 075040
- Patron saint: Saint Dominic and Our Lady of the Assumption
- Saint day: August 8 and 15
- Website: Official website

Martano (Griko: Μαρτάνα, translit. Martána; Salentino: Martanu) is a town and comune of 9,573 inhabitants in the province of Lecce in Apulia, Italy, 20 kilometres (12 mi) from Lecce and 18 kilometres (11 mi) from Otranto. It is the biggest town of Grecìa Salentina, an area where some inhabitants, in addition to Italian and Salentino can also speak a Greek dialect called Griko.

== Sights ==
The main attraction is the medieval castle in the old town centre, largely rebuilt in the 15th century retaining some features of the previous century, while the biggest churches are those devoted to the Mother of the Assumption and to Madonna del Rosario. The town also owns the highest menhir in Apulia, Santu Totaru menhir, at 4.80 metres (15.7 ft), and an ancient Cistercians monastery devoted to the Mother of the Consolation.

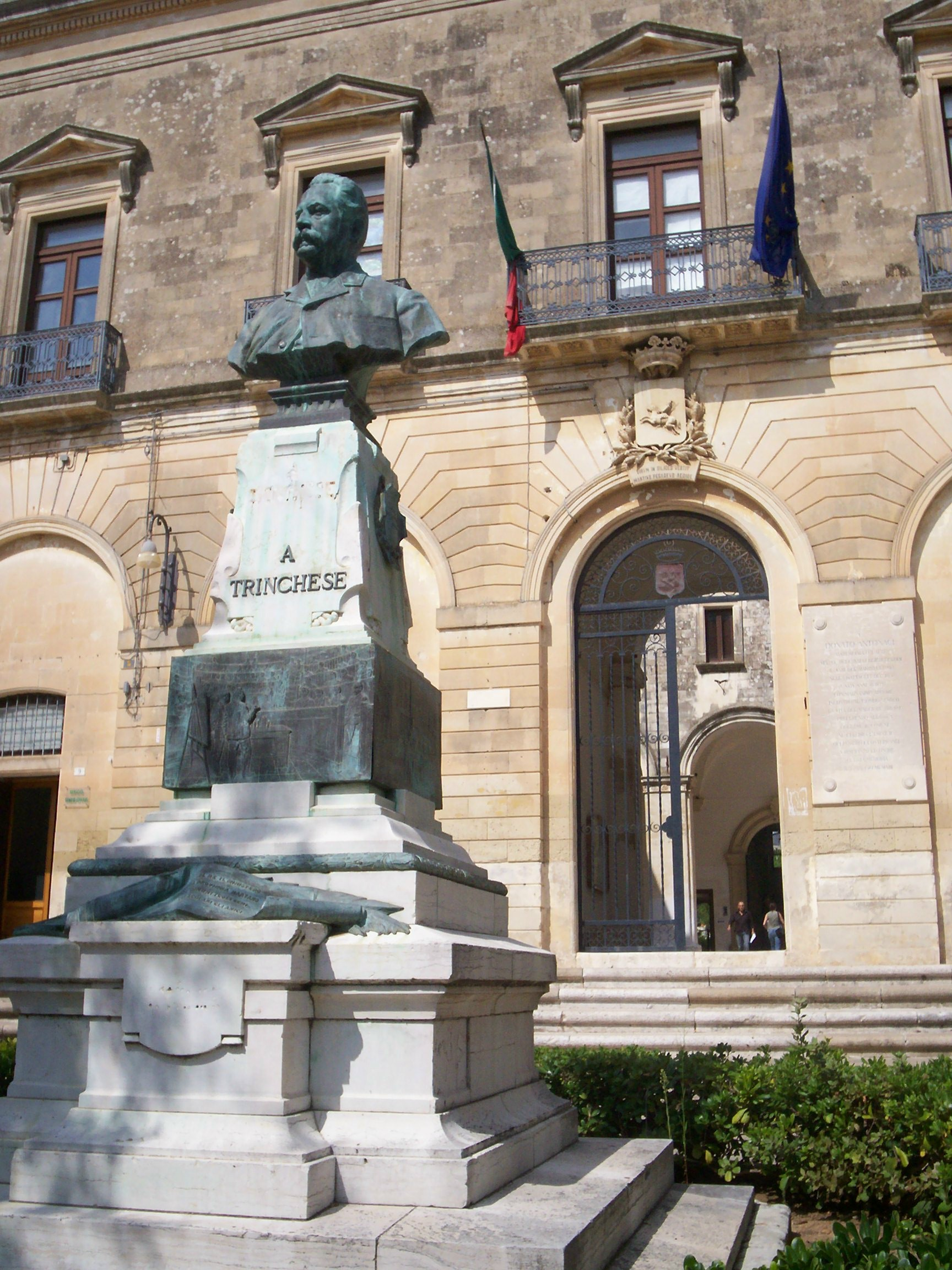
City hall with monument of Salvatore Trinchese

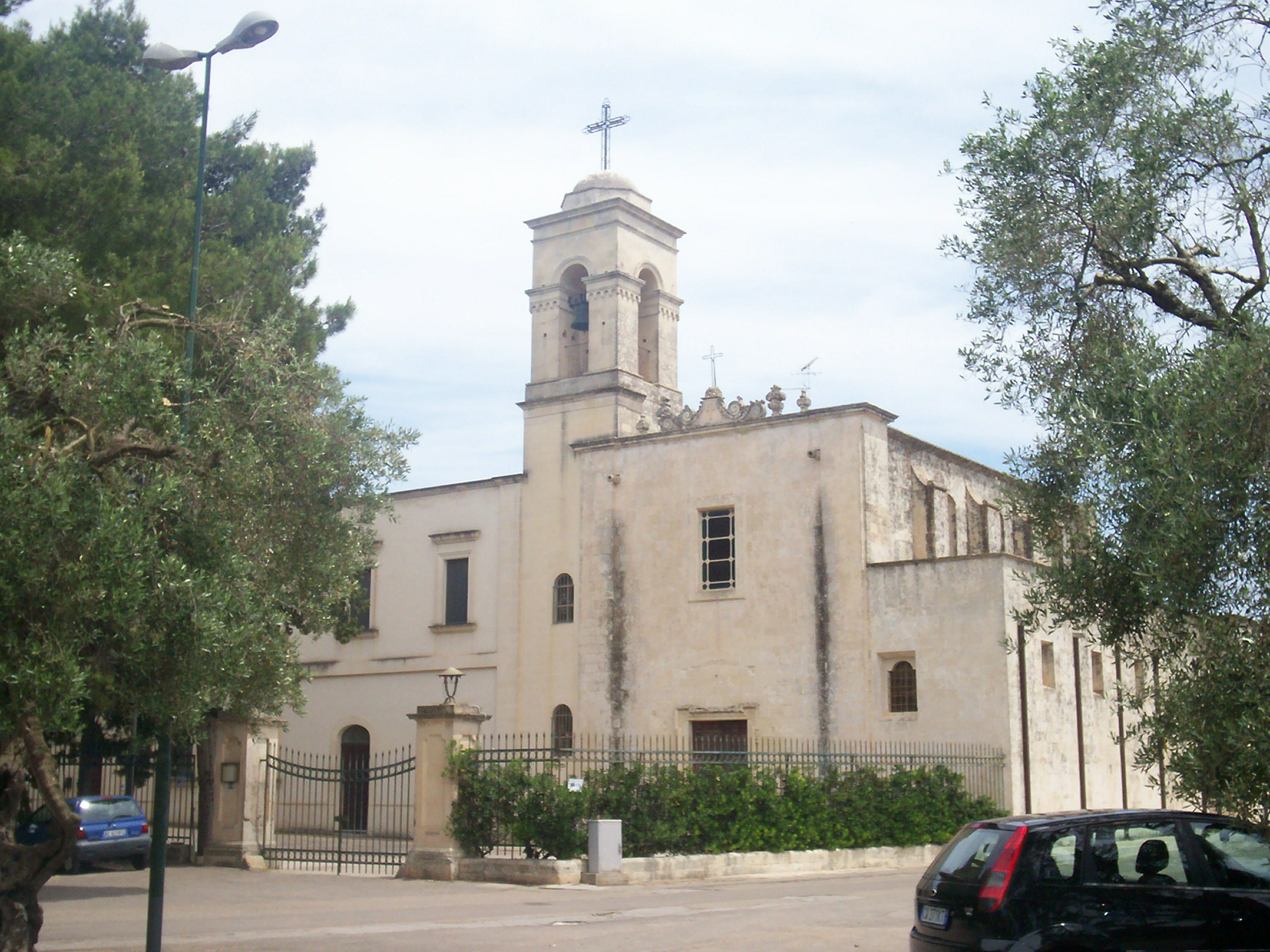
Cistercians monastery

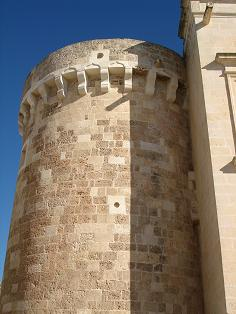
Castle tower

== Notable people ==
- Giuseppe Grassi, who signed the Constitution of Italy in 1948
- Salvatore Trinchese, marine biologist of the 19th century
