= Castrignano de' Greci =

Castrignano de' Greci Καστρινιάνα/Kascignàna (Griko) Cascignanu (Salentino)
- Comune
- Comune di Castrignano de' Greci
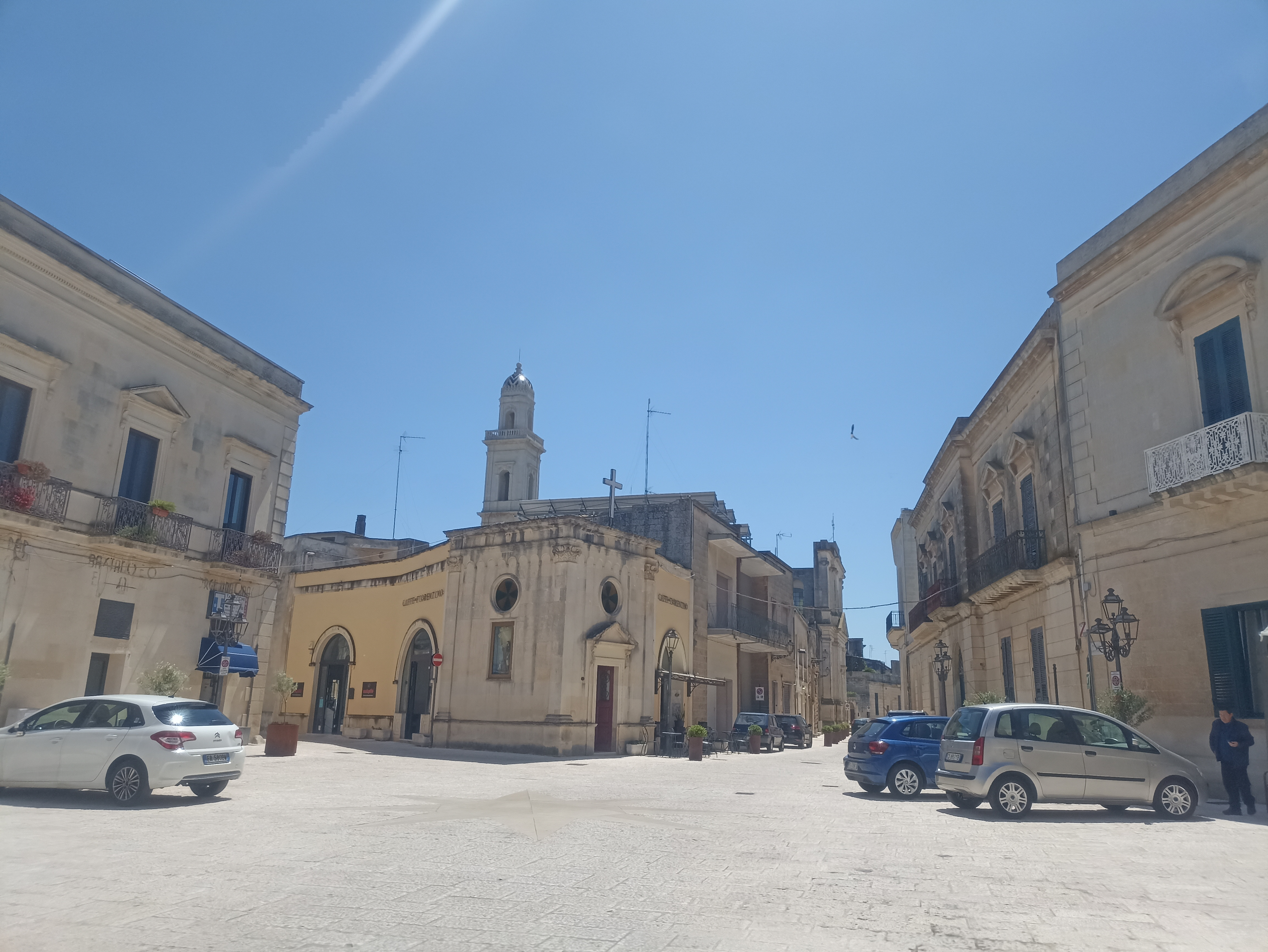

- Coat of arms

- Location within Italy Location within Apulia
- Coordinates: 40°12′N 18°18′E
- Country: Italy
- Region: Apulia
- Province: Lecce (LE)

Government
  - Mayor: Donato Amato

Area
  - Total: 9 km^{2} (3.5 sq mi)
- Elevation: 90 m (300 ft)

Population (31 December 2004)
  - Total: 4,107
  - Density: 460/km^{2} (1,200/sq mi)
- Demonym: Castrignanesi
- Time zone: UTC+1 (CET)
  - Summer (DST): UTC+2 (CEST)
- Postal code: 73020
- Dialing code: 0836
- ISTAT code: 075018
- Patron saint: St. Anthony of Padua
- Saint day: June 13

Castrignano de' Greci (Griko: Καστρινιάνα, Kascignàna; Salentino: Cascignanu) is a small town and comune of 4,107 inhabitants in the province of Lecce in Apulia, southern Italy. It is one of the nine towns of Grecìa Salentina.

The inhabitants of Castrignano, alongside Italian, also speak Griko which reveals significant Greek influences over the course of time, presumably from the time of the Byzantine control, or even the ancient Magna Graecia colonisation in the 8th century BCE.
