= Bova =

Bova may refer to:

Places:

- Bova, Iran (disambiguation), places in Iran
- Bova, Calabria, a comune in the Province of Reggio Calabria in Italy
- Bova Marina, a comune in the Province of Reggio Calabria in Italy
  - Bova Marina Synagogue
- Roman Catholic Archdiocese of Reggio Calabria-Bova, an archdiocese in Italy
- Roman Catholic Diocese of Bova in Calabria, Italy

People:

- Antonio Bova (1641–1701), Italian painter
- Ben Bova (1932–2020), American science fiction author and editor
- Dario Bova (born 1984), Italian footballer
- Dina Bova (born 1977), Israeli photographer and digital artist
- Domenico Bova (1946–2019), Italian politician
- Giuseppe Bova, Italian politician
- Jeff Bova (born 1953), American musician
- Joseph Bova (1924–2006), American actor
- Louis Bova (1909–1963), the only coal miner in the Sheppton Mine disaster that was not found
- Marisa Bova (born 2000), American soccer player
- Raoul Bova (born 1971), Italian actor
- Tony Bova (1917–1973), American football player

Fiction:

- Bova (comics), a Marvel Comics character
- Prince Bova, a hero from Russian folklore, of literary origin

Other:

- VDL Bova, a luxury coachbuilder based in Eindhoven, the Netherlands
- Board of Veterans' Appeals

== See also ==
- Bowa (disambiguation)
