= Staiti =

Staiti Στάτη (Greek)
- Comune
- Comune di Staiti
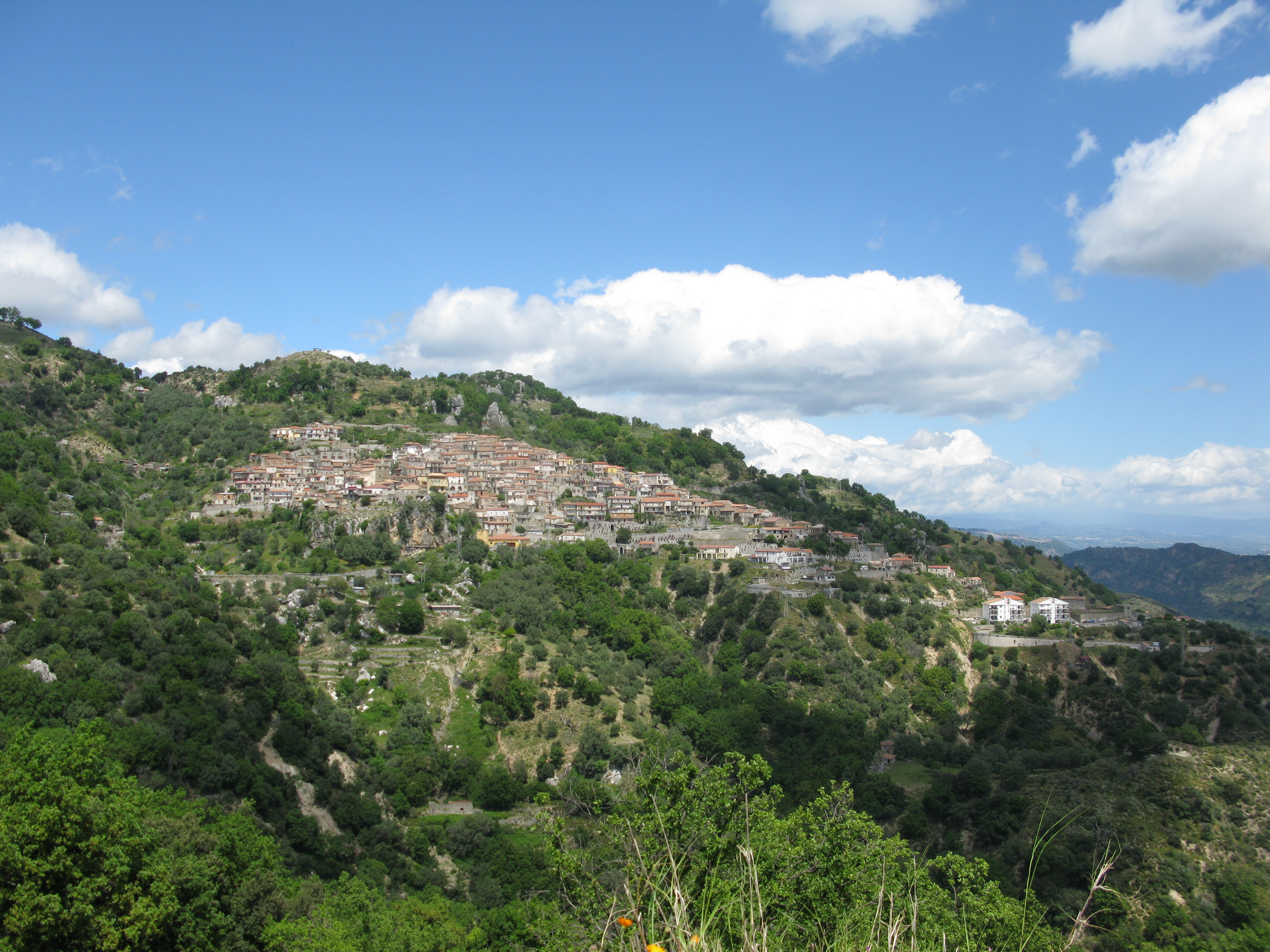

- Location within Italy Location within Calabria
- Coordinates: 38°0′N 16°2′E
- Country: Italy
- Region: Calabria
- Metropolitan city: Reggio Calabria (RC)

Area
  - Total: 16.31 km^{2} (6.30 sq mi)

Population (2026)
  - Total: 161
  - Density: 9.87/km^{2} (25.6/sq mi)
- Demonym: Staitani
- Time zone: UTC+1 (CET)
  - Summer (DST): UTC+2 (CEST)
- Postal code: 89030
- Dialing code: 0964
- Patron saint: Sant-Anna
- Saint day: July 26

Staiti (Calabrian Greek: Στάτη, romanized: Stàti) is a village and comune (municipality) in the Metropolitan City of Reggio Calabria in the region of Calabria in southern Italy, located about 110 kilometres (68 mi) southwest of Catanzaro and about 35 kilometres (22 mi) southeast of Reggio Calabria. With a population of 161, it is the least populous municipality in Calabria.

Staiti borders the municipalities of Africo, Bova, Brancaleone, Bruzzano Zeffirio, and Palizzi.

== Demographics ==
As of 2026, the population is 161, of which 50.9% are male, and 49.1% are female. Minors make up 8.7% of the population, and seniors make up 45.3%.

Historical population

Year	Pop.	±%
1861	1,503	—
1871	1,468	−2.3%
1881	1,550	+5.6%
1901	1,598	+3.1%
1911	1,680	+5.1%
1921	1,456	−13.3%
1931	1,450	−0.4%
1936	1,614	+11.3%

Year	Pop.	±%
1951	1,434	−11.2%
1961	1,199	−16.4%
1971	894	−25.4%
1981	742	−17.0%
1991	516	−30.5%
2001	395	−23.4%
2011	279	−29.4%
2021	189	−32.3%

Source: ISTAT

=== Immigration ===
As of 2025, immigrants make up 3.0% of the total population. The foreign countries of birth are Germany, Switzerland, and Romania.
