= Palizzi =

Palizzi Σπυρόπολη (Greek)
- Comune
- Comune di Palizzi
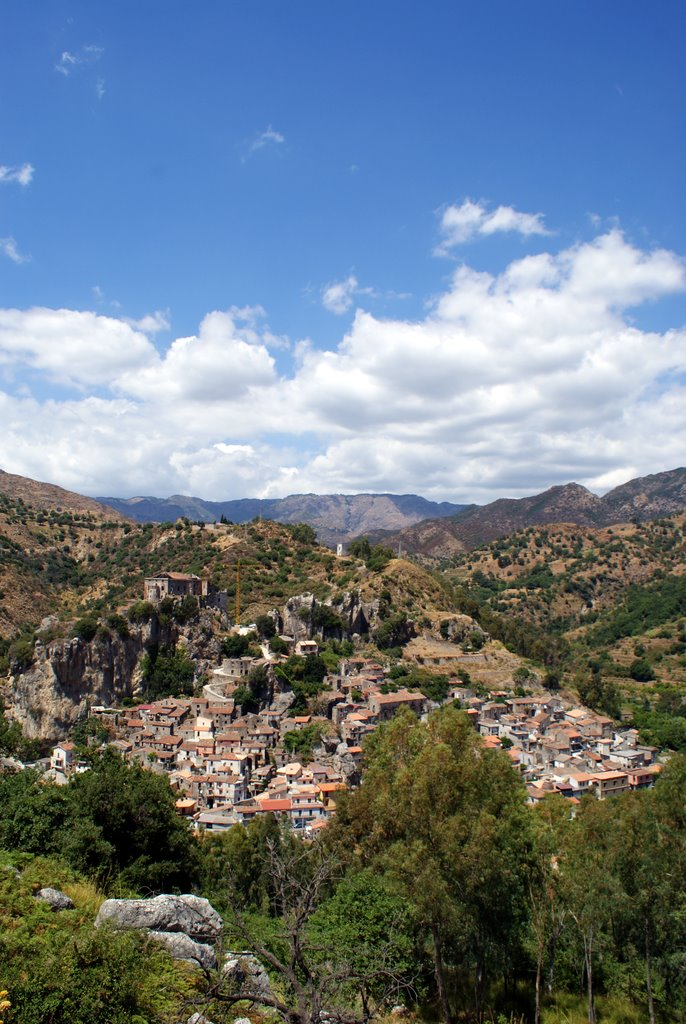
- Palizzi Superiore

- Location within Italy Location within Calabria
- Coordinates: 37°58′N 15°59′E
- Country: Italy
- Region: Calabria
- Metropolitan city: Reggio Calabria (RC)
- Frazioni: Palizzi Superiore, Palizzi Marina, Pietrapennata, Spropoli

Government
  - Mayor: Erminio Fiumanò

Area
  - Total: 52.3 km^{2} (20.2 sq mi)
- Elevation: 272 m (892 ft)

Population (31 December 2017)
  - Total: 2,436
  - Density: 46.6/km^{2} (121/sq mi)
- Demonym: Palizzesi
- Time zone: UTC+1 (CET)
  - Summer (DST): UTC+2 (CEST)
- Postal code: 89030
- Dialing code: 0965
- Website: Official website

Palizzi (Calabrian Greek: Σπυρόπολη; Spyrópoli) is a comune (municipality) in the Province of Reggio Calabria in the Italian region Calabria, located about 120 kilometres (75 mi) southwest of Catanzaro and about 30 kilometres (19 mi) southeast of Reggio Calabria. The southernmost point in mainland Italy lies in Palizzi.

It is one of the Greek (Griko dialect) speaking villages of Bovesia one of the two Griko-speaking areas of southern Italy.

Palizzi borders the following municipalities: Bova, Bova Marina, Brancaleone, Staiti.

== See also ==
- Calabrian wine
- Capo Spartivento Calabro Lighthouse
