= Southern Italy =

Macroregion of Italy

Southern Italy: Sud Italia (Italian); 'o Sudde (Neapolitan); Italia dû Suddi (Sicilian); Meridione; Mezzogiorno
- Macroregion
- Country: Italy
- Largest city: Naples
- Regions: List: Abruzzo; Apulia; Basilicata; Calabria; Campania; Molise; Sardinia; Sicily

Area
  - Total: 123,731.97 km^{2} (47,773.18 sq mi)

Population (2026)
  - Total: 19,669,678
  - Density: 158.97005/km^{2} (411.73055/sq mi)
- Languages
  - Official language: Italian
  - Official linguistic minorities: Arbëresh; Catalan; Calabrian Greek; Franco-Provençal; Griko dialect; Occitan; Sardinian; Serbo-Croatian
  - Regional languages: Corsican; Neapolitan; Sicilian

Southern Italy, also known as Meridione ([meriˈdjoːne]) or Mezzogiorno ([ˌmɛddzoˈdʒorno]), is a macroregion of Italy consisting of its southern regions. In the 21st century, the term "Mezzogiorno" mostly refers to the regions that are associated with the people, lands or culture of the historical and cultural region that was once politically under the administration of the former Kingdoms of Naples and Sicily (officially denominated as one entity Regnum Siciliae citra Pharum and ultra Pharum, i.e. "Kingdom of Sicily on the other side of the Strait" and "across the Strait") and which later shared a common organization into Italy's largest pre-unitarian state, the Kingdom of the Two Sicilies.

The island of Sardinia, which was not part of the aforementioned polity and had been under the rule of the Alpine House of Savoy, which would eventually annex the Bourbons' southern Italian kingdom altogether, is nonetheless often subsumed into the Mezzogiorno. The Italian National Institute of Statistics (ISTAT) employs the term "South Italy" (Italia meridionale, or just Sud, i.e. "south") to statistically identify in its reportings the six mainland regions of southern Italy without Sicily and Sardinia, which form a distinct statistical region under the ISTAT denominated "Insular Italy" (Italia insulare, or simply Isole "Islands"). These same subdivisions are at the bottom of the Italian First level NUTS of the European Union and the Italian constituencies for the European Parliament. Nonetheless, Sardinia and especially Sicily are included as "southern Italy" in most definitions of the southern Italy macroregion.

== Etymology of Mezzogiorno ==
In a similar fashion to France's Midi ("midday" or "noon" in French), the Italian term "Mezzogiorno" refers to the intensity and the position of sunshine at midday in the south of the Italian Peninsula. The term came into vogue after the annexation of the Bourbon Kingdom of the Two Sicilies by the mainland-based Savoyard Kingdom of Sardinia, and the subsequent Italian unification of 1861.

== Regions ==
Southern Italy is generally thought to comprise the administrative regions that correspond to the geopolitical extent of the historical Kingdom of the Two Sicilies, including Abruzzo, Apulia, Basilicata, Calabria, Campania, Molise, and Sicily. The island of Sardinia, although being culturally, linguistically, and historically less related to the aforementioned regions than any of them is to one another is frequently included as part of the Mezzogiorno, often for statistical and economical purposes.

| Region | Capital | Population (2026) | Area (km²) | Density (inh./km²) |
|---|---|---|---|---|
| Abruzzo | L'Aquila | 1,267,222 | 10,831.84 | 117.0 |
| Apulia | Bari | 3,865,277 | 19,540.90 | 197.8 |
| Basilicata | Potenza | 525,281 | 10,073.32 | 52.1 |
| Calabria | Catanzaro | 1,827,571 | 15,221.90 | 120.1 |
| Campania | Naples | 5,568,703 | 13,670.95 | 407.3 |
| Molise | Campobasso | 285,940 | 4,460.65 | 64.1 |
| Sardinia | Cagliari | 1,554,490 | 24,100.02 | 64.5 |
| Sicily | Palermo | 4,775,194 | 25,832.39 | 184.9 |

== Geography ==
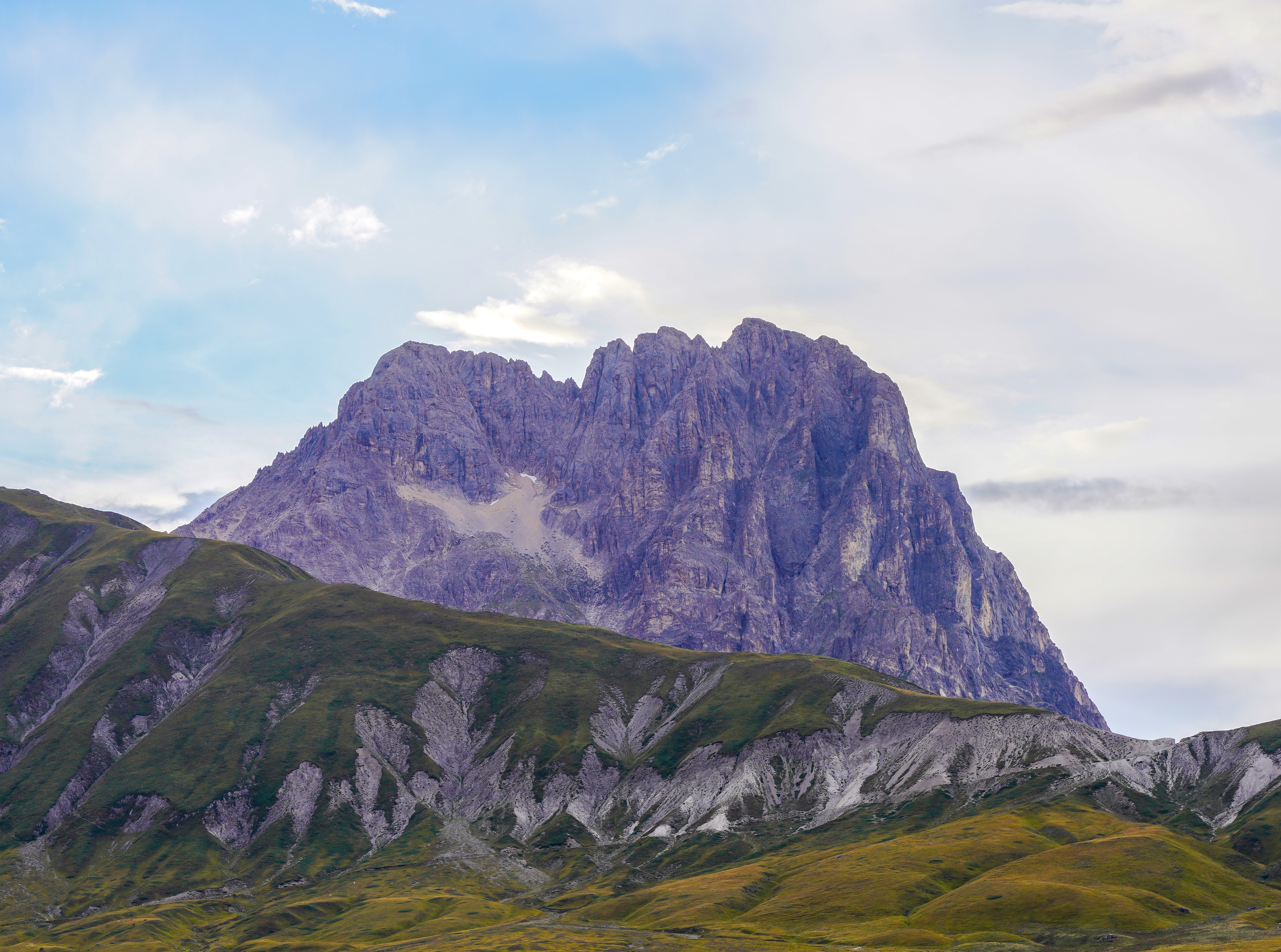
Gran Sasso d'Italia in Abruzzo, the highest peak in the Apennines and the second-highest in Italy outside the Alps

Southern Italy forms the lower part of the Italian "boot," comprising the ankle (Campania), the toe (Calabria), the arch (Basilicata), and the heel (Apulia), as well as Molise (north of Apulia) and Abruzzo (north of Molise). It also includes Sicily, which is separated from Calabria by the narrow Strait of Messina. The Gulf of Taranto—an arm of the Ionian Sea—lies between the heel and toe of the "boot" and is named after the city of Taranto, situated at the angle between them. The island of Sardinia, located west of the Italian peninsula and just south of the French island of Corsica, is also often included in Southern Italy.

The eastern coast is bordered by the Adriatic Sea, which connects to the wider Mediterranean via the Strait of Otranto, named after the largest city on the tip of the heel. On the Adriatic, just south of the "spur" of the boot, lies the Monte Gargano peninsula. On the Tyrrhenian Sea, the Gulfs of Salerno, Naples, Policastro, and Gaeta are each named after major coastal cities. Along the northern coast of the Gulf of Salerno and the southern edge of the Sorrentine Peninsula runs the Amalfi Coast; off the peninsula's tip is the island of Capri.

The region's climate is predominantly Mediterranean (Köppen classification Csa), except at higher elevations (Dsa, Dsb) and in the semi-arid eastern areas of Apulia and Molise, as well as along the Ionian coast of Calabria and in southern Sicily (BSk/BSh). Naples is the largest city in Southern Italy, retaining its ancient Greek name for millennia. Other major cities include Bari, Taranto, Reggio Calabria, Foggia, and Salerno. Southern Italy is geologically active and highly seismic, with the exception of the Salento area in Apulia. The 1980 Irpinia earthquake, for example, resulted in 2,914 deaths, over 10,000 injuries, and left 300,000 people homeless.

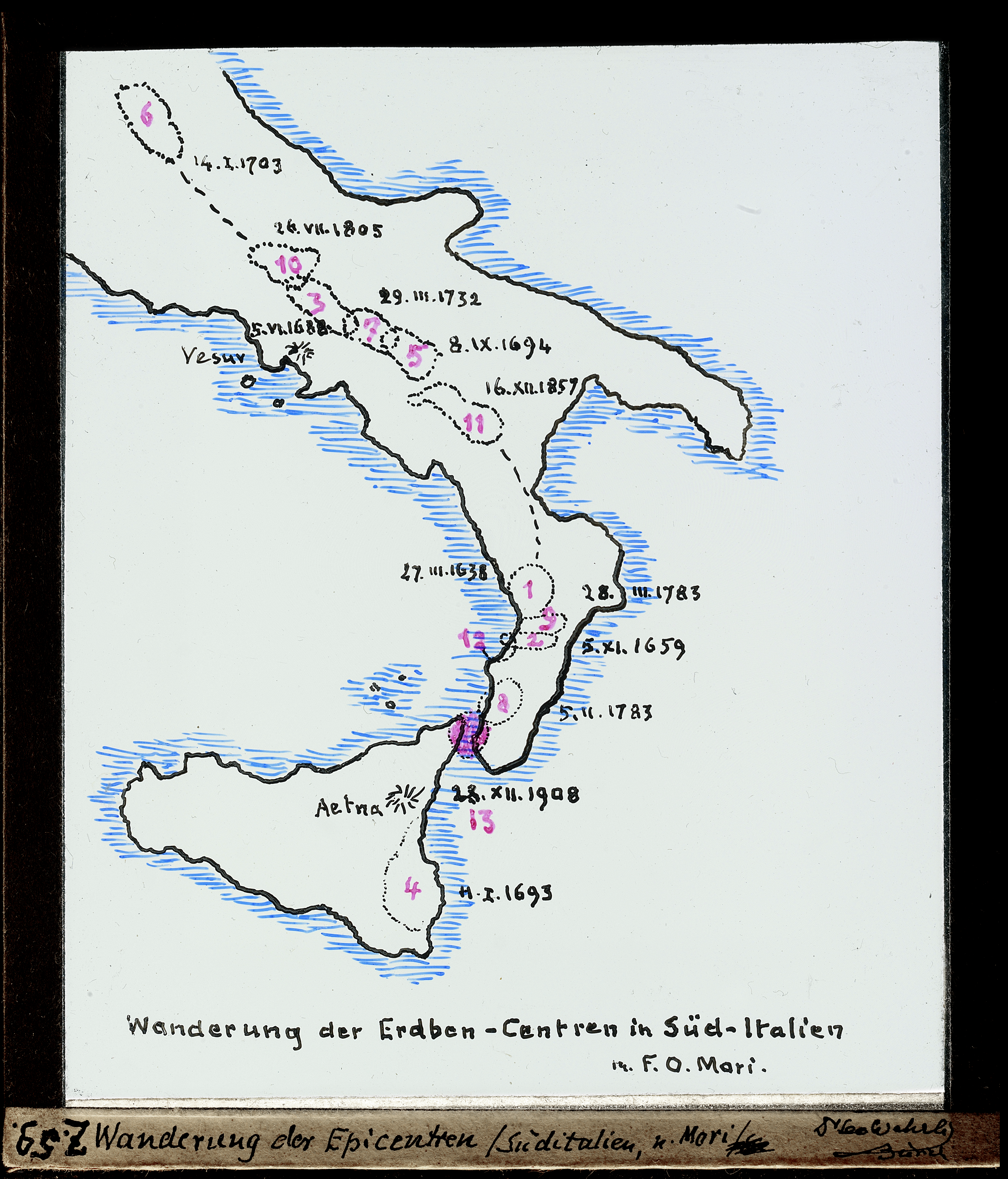
Chronological map of the main seismic events in Southern Italy during the modern and contemporary periods

== History ==
=== Prehistory and antiquity ===
In the 8th and the 7th centuries BCE, for various reasons, including demographic crisis (famine, overcrowding etc.), the search for new commercial outlets and ports, and expulsion from their homeland, Greeks began to settle in southern Italy. Also during this period, Greek colonies were established in places as widely separated as the eastern coast of the Black Sea, Eastern Libya and Massalia (Marseille).

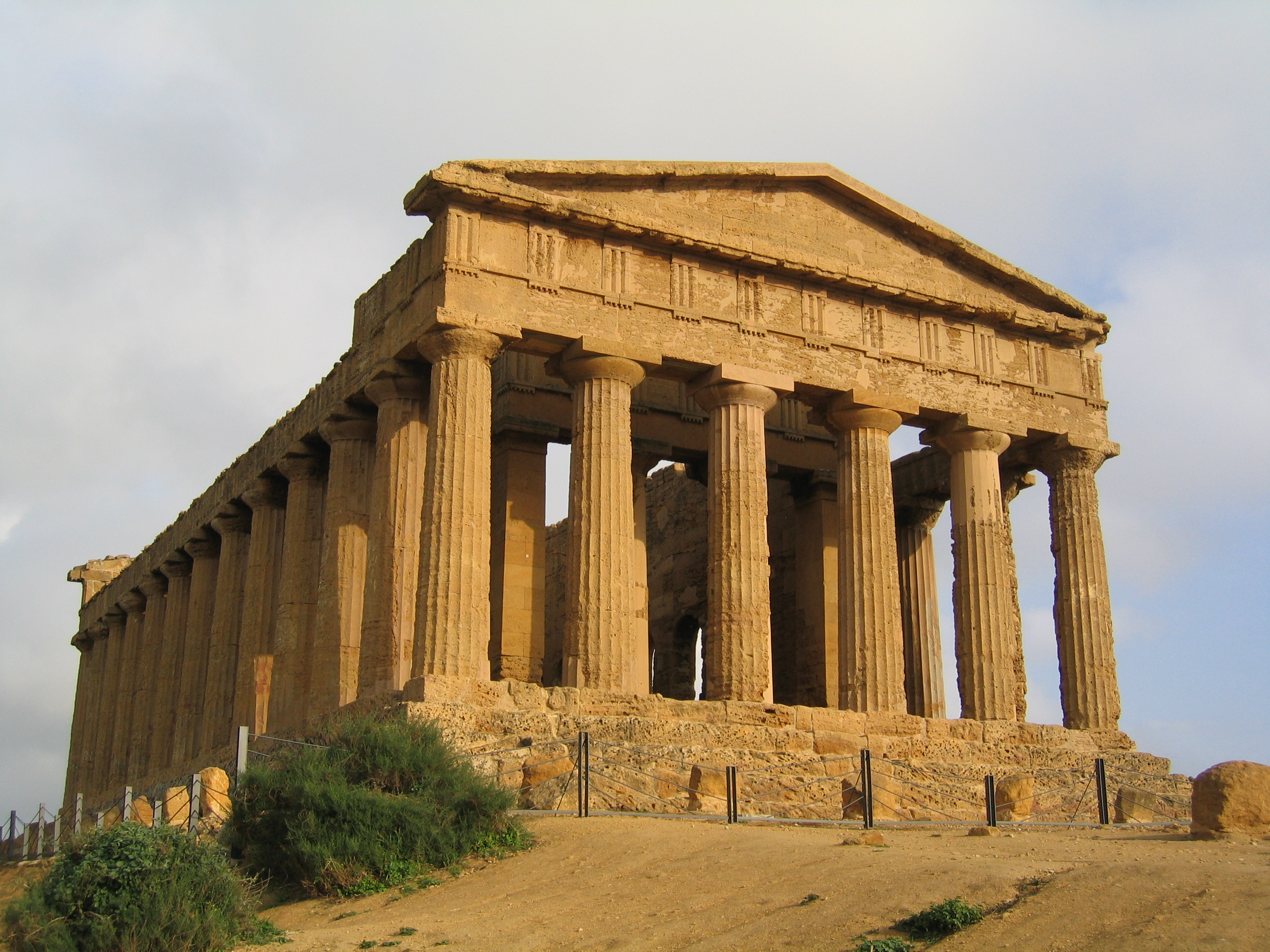
The Greek Temple of Concordia, Valle dei Templi, Agrigento, Sicily

They included settlements in Sicily and the southern part of the Italian peninsula. The first Greek settlers found Italy inhabited by three major populations: Ausones, Oenotrians and Iapyges (the last of which were subdivided into three tribes: Daunians, Peucetians and Messapians). The relationships between the Greek settlers and the native peoples were initially hostile especially with the Iapygian tribes. The Hellenic influence eventually shaped their culture and way of life.

Ancient Greek colonies of Magna Graecia and their dialect groupings in southern Italy Northwest Doric Achaean Doric Doric proper Ionic

The Romans used to call the area of Sicily and coastal southern Italy Magna Graecia ("Great Greece") since it was so densely populated by coastal Greek colonies; the ancient geographers differed on whether the term included Sicily or merely Apulia and Calabria with Strabo being the most prominent advocate of the wider definitions.

With this colonisation, Greek culture was exported to Italy in its dialects of the Ancient Greek language, its religious rites and its traditions of the independent polis. An original Hellenic civilization soon developed, later interacting with the native Italic and Roman civilisations. The most important cultural transplant was the Chalcidean/Cumaean variety of the Greek alphabet, which was adopted by the Etruscans; the Old Italic alphabet subsequently evolved into the Latin alphabet, which became the most widely used alphabet in the world.

Many of the new Hellenic cities became very rich and powerful like Neapolis (Νεάπολις, Naples, "New City"), Syrakousai (Συράκουσαι, Syracuse), Akragas (Ἀκράγας, Agrigento), and Sybaris (Σύβαρις, Sibari). Other cities in Magna Graecia included Tarentum (Τάρας), Metapontum (Μεταπόντιον), Heraclea (Ἡράκλεια), Epizephyrian Locri (Λοκροὶ Ἐπιζεφύριοι), Rhegium (Ῥήγιον), Croton (Κρότων), Thurii (Θούριοι), Elea (Ἐλέα), Nola (Νῶλα), Syessa (Σύεσσα), Bari (Βάριον), and others.

Although many of the Greek inhabitants of Magna Graecia were entirely Latinized during the Middle Ages, pockets of Greek culture and language remained and have survived to the present day. One example is the Griko people in Calabria (Bovesia) and Salento (Grecìa Salentina), some of whom still maintain their Greek language (Griko language) and customs. The Griko language is the last living trace of the Greek elements that once formed Magna Graecia.

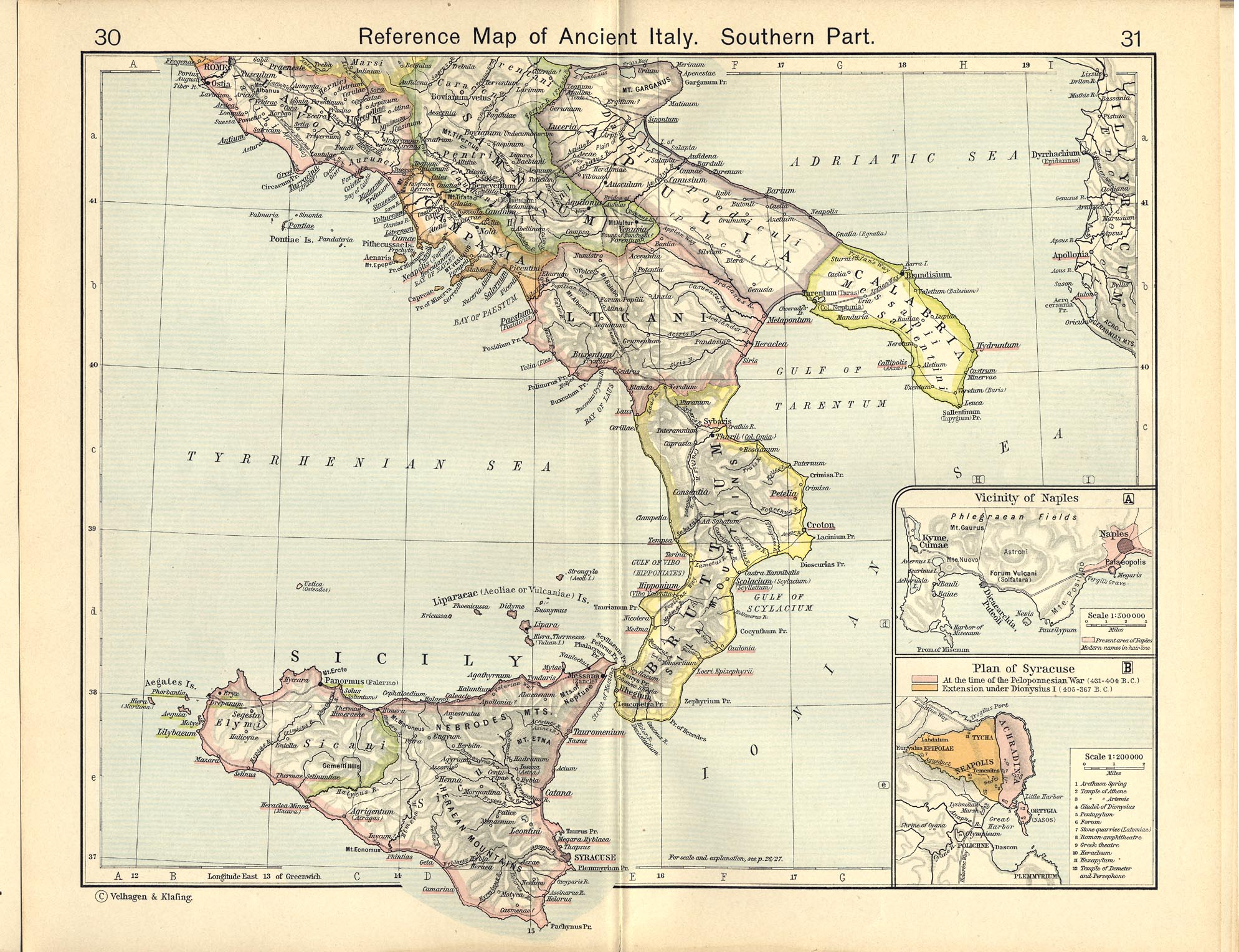
Southern Italy under Augustus

After Pyrrhus of Epirus failed in his attempt to stop the spread of Roman hegemony in 282 BCE, the south fell under Roman domination and remained in such a position until the barbarian invasions (the Gladiator War is a notable suspension of imperial control). It was restored to Eastern Roman control in the 530s after the fall of Rome in the West in 476, and some form of imperial authority survived until the 1070s. Total East Roman rule was ended by the Lombards by Zotto's conquest in the final quarter of the 6th century.

=== Middle Ages ===
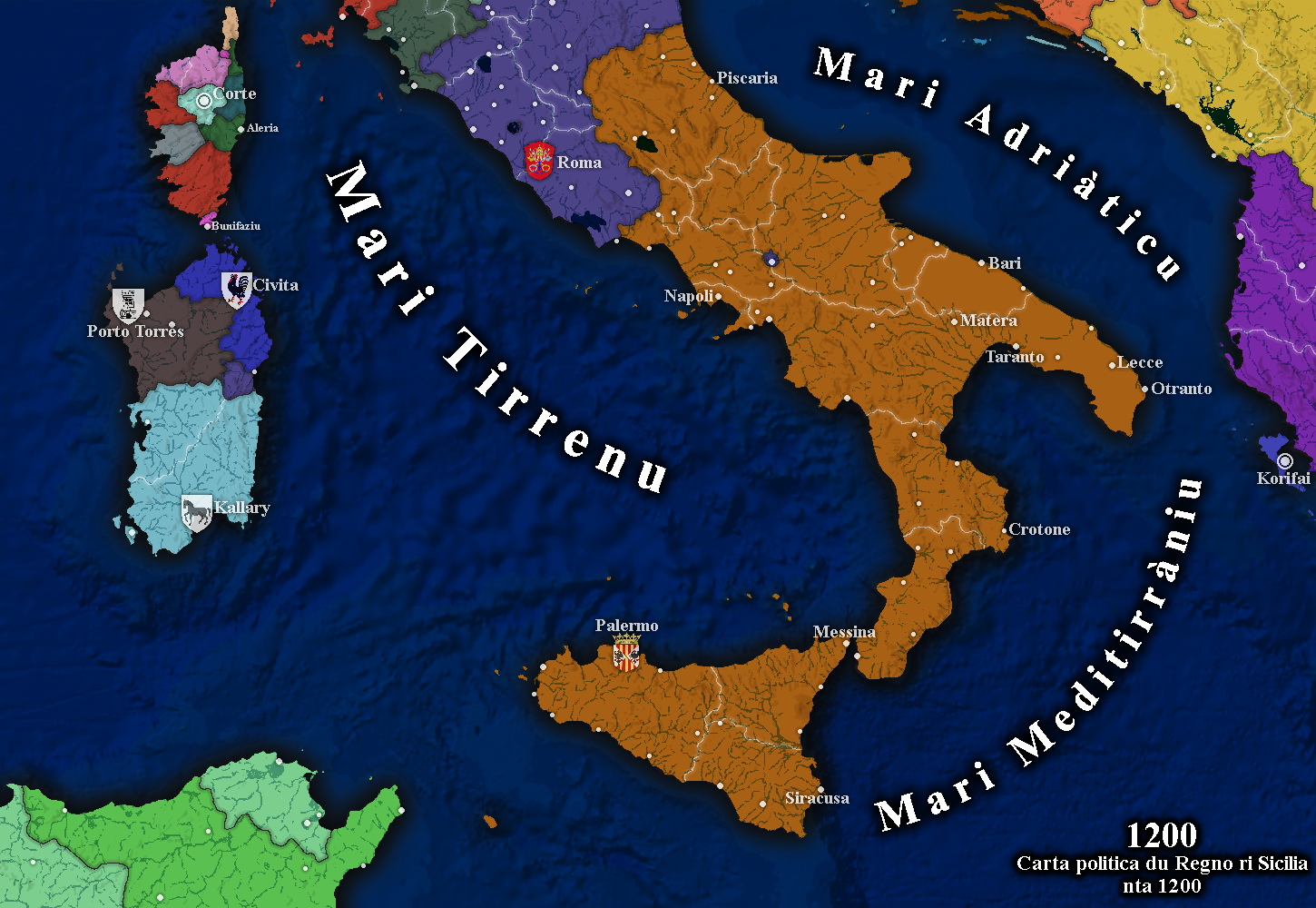
Detailed map of the Kingdom of Sicily

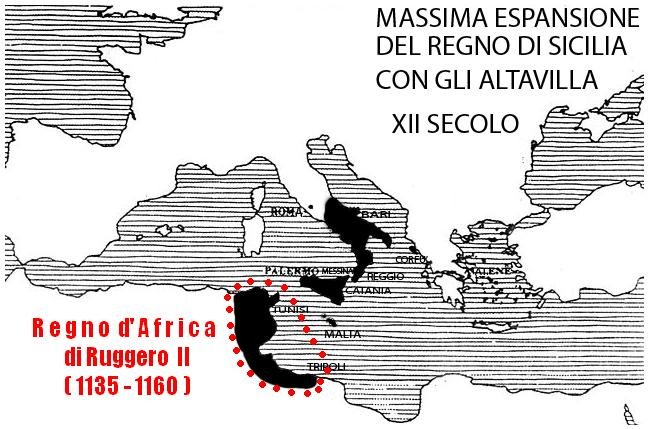
The Kingdom of Sicily at its greatest extent, during the 12th century

After the Gothic War (535–554) until the arrival of the Normans, much of southern Italy's destiny was linked to the fortunes of the Eastern Empire even though Byzantine domination was challenged in the 9th century by the Lombards, who annexed the area of Cosenza to their Duchy of Benevento. Consequently, the Lombard and the Byzantine areas became influenced by Eastern monasticism, and much of southern Italy experienced a slow process of orientalisation in religious life (rites, cults and liturgy), which accompanied a spread of Eastern churches and monasteries that preserved and transmitted the Greek and Hellenistic tradition. The Cattolica monastery in Stilo is the most representative of these Byzantine monuments. From then to the 11th-century Norman conquest the south of the peninsula was constantly plunged into wars between the Byzantines, Lombardy, and the Aghlabid dynasty. The latter established two emirates in southern Italy: the Emirate of Sicily and, for 25 years, the Emirate of Bari. Amalfi, an independent republic from the 7th century until 1075, and to a lesser extent Gaeta, Molfetta and Trani, rivalled other Italian maritime republics in their domestic prosperity and maritime importance.

Southern Italy in 1112

From 999 to 1139, the Normans occupied all the Lombard and Byzantine possessions in southern Italy, ended a millennium of imperial Roman rule in Italy and eventually expelled the Muslims from Sicily. The Norman Kingdom of Sicily under Roger II was characterised by its competent governance, multi-ethnic nature and religious tolerance. Normans, Jews, Muslim Arabs, Byzantine Greeks, Lombards and "native" Sicilians lived in relative harmony. However, the Norman domination lasted only several decades before it formally ended in 1198 with the reign of Constance of Sicily, and was replaced by that of the Swabian Hohenstaufen dynasty, thanks to Constance's marriage to Henry VI, member of this family.

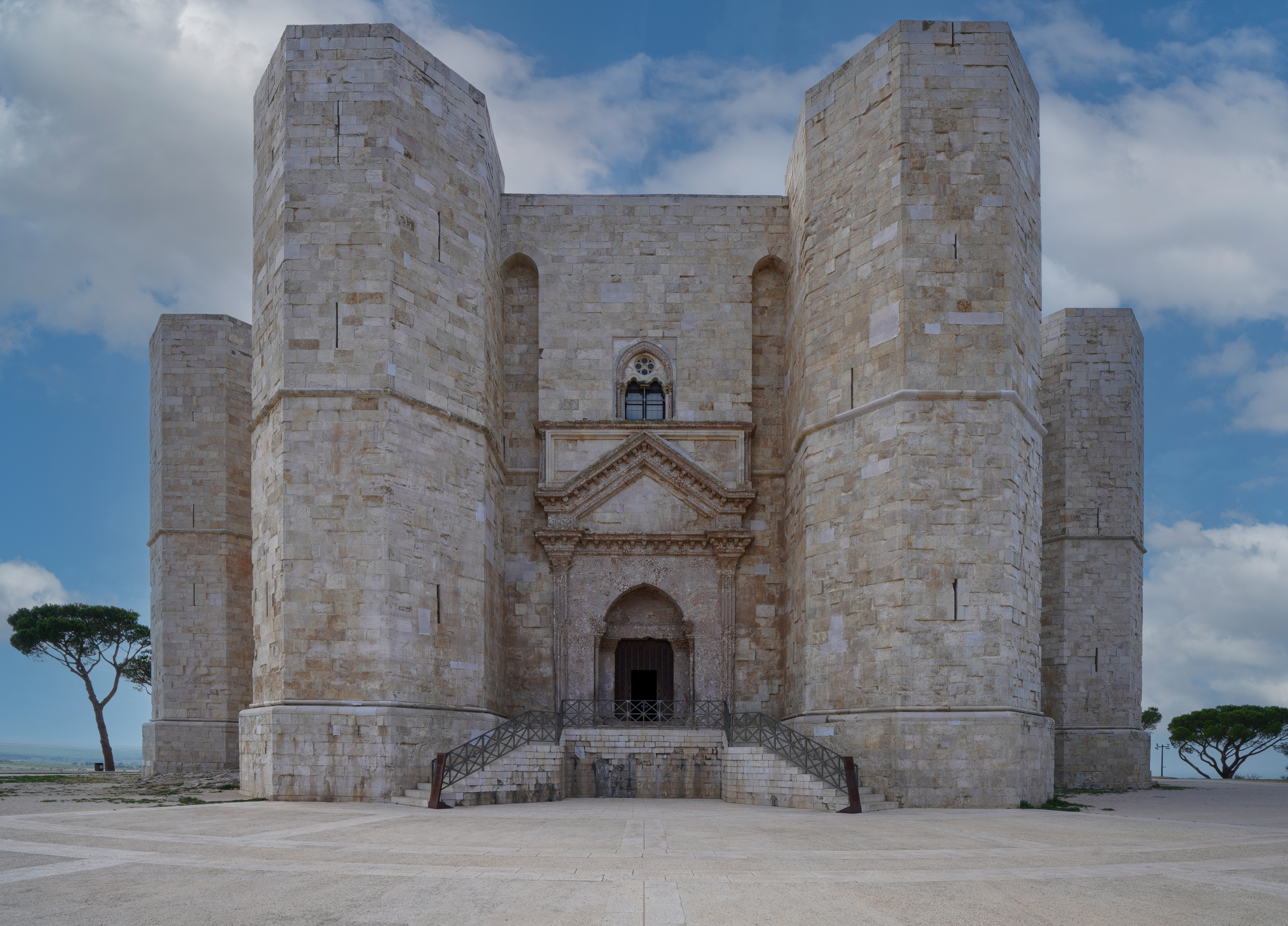
Castel del Monte, built by Frederick II between 1240 and 1250 in Andria, Apulia

In Sicily, King Frederick II endorsed a deep reform of the laws culminating with the promulgation of the Constitutions of Melfi (1231, also known as Liber Augustalis), a collection of laws for his realm that was remarkable for its time and a source of inspiration for a long time afterward. It made the Kingdom of Sicily a centralised state and established the primacy of written law. With relatively small modifications, the Liber Augustalis remained the basis of Sicilian law until 1819. His royal court in Palermo from around 1220 to his death saw the first use of a literary form of an Italo-Romance language, Sicilian, which had a significant influence on what was to become the modern Italian language. He also built the Castel del Monte and in 1224 founded the University of Naples, now called, after him, Università Federico II.

In 1266, conflict between the House of Hohenstaufen and the papacy led to Sicily's conquest by Charles I, Duke of Anjou. Opposition to French officialdom and taxation combined with incitement of rebellion by agents from the Byzantine Empire and the Crown of Aragon led to the Sicilian Vespers insurrection and successful invasion by king Peter III of Aragon in 1282. The resulting War of the Sicilian Vespers lasted until 1302 the Peace of Caltabellotta divided the old Kingdom of Sicily into two.

The island of Sicily, called the "Kingdom of Sicily beyond the Lighthouse" or the Kingdom of Trinacria, went to Frederick III of the House of Barcelona, who had been ruling it. The peninsular territories, called Kingdom of Sicily contemporaneously but Kingdom of Naples by modern scholarship, went to Charles II of the House of Anjou, who had likewise been ruling it. Thus, the peace was formal recognition of an uneasy status quo. Although the king of Spain had seized both two crowns in the 16th century, the administrations of the two halves of the Kingdom of Sicily remained separated until 1816, when they were reunited in the Kingdom of Two Sicilies.

The Kingdom of Sicily in 1154

=== Early modern history ===
In 1442, Alfonso V conquered the Kingdom of Naples and unified Sicily and Naples once again as dependencies of the Crown of Aragon. At his death in 1458, the kingdom was again divided . Ferrante, Alfonso's illegitimate son, inherited Naples. When Ferrante died in 1494, Charles VIII of France invaded Italy by using the Angevin claim to the throne of Naples, which his father had inherited on the death of King René's nephew in 1481, as a pretext, which started the Italian Wars. Charles VIII expelled Ferrante's successor, Alfonso II of Naples, from Naples in 1495. However, he was soon forced to withdraw because of the support of Ferdinand II of Aragon to his cousin, Alfonso II's son Ferrantino.

Ferrantino was restored to the throne but died in 1496 and was succeeded by his uncle, Frederick IV. The French, however, did not give up their claim and, in 1501, agreed to a partition of the kingdom with Ferdinand of Aragon, who abandoned his cousin, King Frederick. The deal soon fell through, however, and the Crown of Aragon and France resumed their war over the kingdom, ultimately resulting in an Aragonese victory leaving Ferdinand in control of the kingdom by 1504.

The kingdom remained disputed between France and Spain for the next several decades. The French efforts to gain control of it became feebler as the decades went on, and Spanish control was never genuinely endangered. The French finally abandoned their claims to the kingdom by the Treaty of Cateau-Cambrésis in 1559. With the Treaty of London (1557), the new client state of the so-called Presidi ("state of the garrisons") was established and governed directly by Spain as part of the Kingdom of Naples.

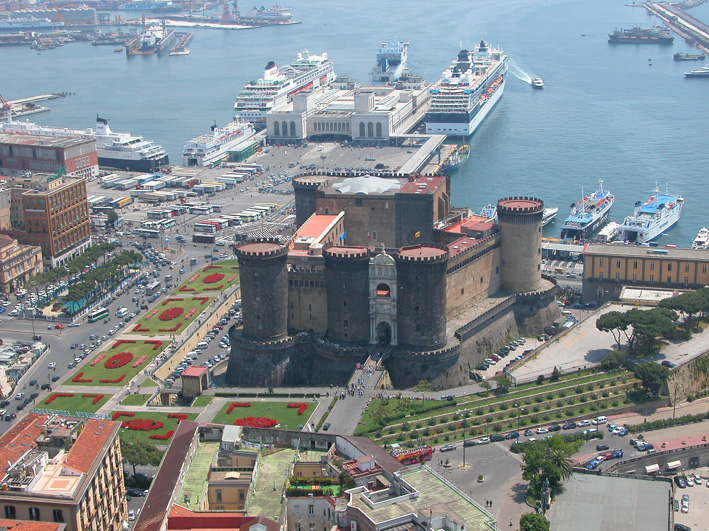
Castel Nuovo, Naples: initiated by the Anjou, it was heavily altered as it served as Spanish headquarters until the 18th century.

The administration of the Kingdom of Naples and Sicily, as well as of the Duchy of Milan, was run by the Council of Italy. The island of Sardinia, which had fully come to be under Iberian sovereignty in 1409 upon the fall of the last indigenous state, was an integral part of the Council of Aragon instead and remained as such until the first years of the XVIII° century, when Sardinia was ceded to Austria and eventually handed over to the Alpine-based House of Savoy in 1720.

After the War of the Spanish Succession in the early 18th century, possession of the kingdom again changed hands. Under the terms of the Treaty of Utrecht in 1713, Naples was given to Charles VI, the Holy Roman Emperor. He also gained control of Sicily in 1720, but Austrian rule did not last long. Both Naples and Sicily were conquered by a Spanish army during the War of the Polish Succession in 1734, and Charles, Duke of Parma, a younger son of King Philip V of Spain was installed as King of Naples and Sicily from 1735. Charles inherited the Spanish throne from his older half-brother in 1759, he left Naples and Sicily to his younger son, Ferdinand IV. Despite the two kingdoms being in a personal union under the House of Bourbon from 1735 onwards, they remained constitutionally separated.

=== Early 19th century ===
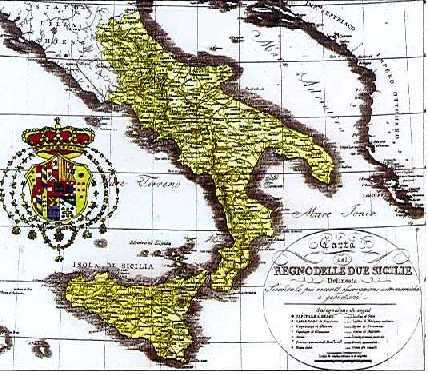
A 19th century map of the Kingdom of the Two Sicilies

Being a member of the House of Bourbon, King Ferdinand IV was a natural opponent of the French Revolution and Napoleon. In January 1799, Napoleon Bonaparte, in the name of the French Republic, captured Naples and proclaimed the Parthenopaean Republic, a French client state, as successor to the kingdom. King Ferdinand fled from Naples to Sicily until June of that year. In 1806, Bonaparte, by then French Emperor, again dethroned King Ferdinand and appointed his brother, Joseph Bonaparte, as King of Naples. In the Edict of Bayonne of 1808, Napoleon removed Joseph to Spain and appointed his brother-in-law, Joachim Murat, as King of the Two Sicilies, though this meant control only of the mainland portion of the kingdom. Throughout this Napoleonic interruption, King Ferdinand remained in Sicily, with Palermo as his capital.

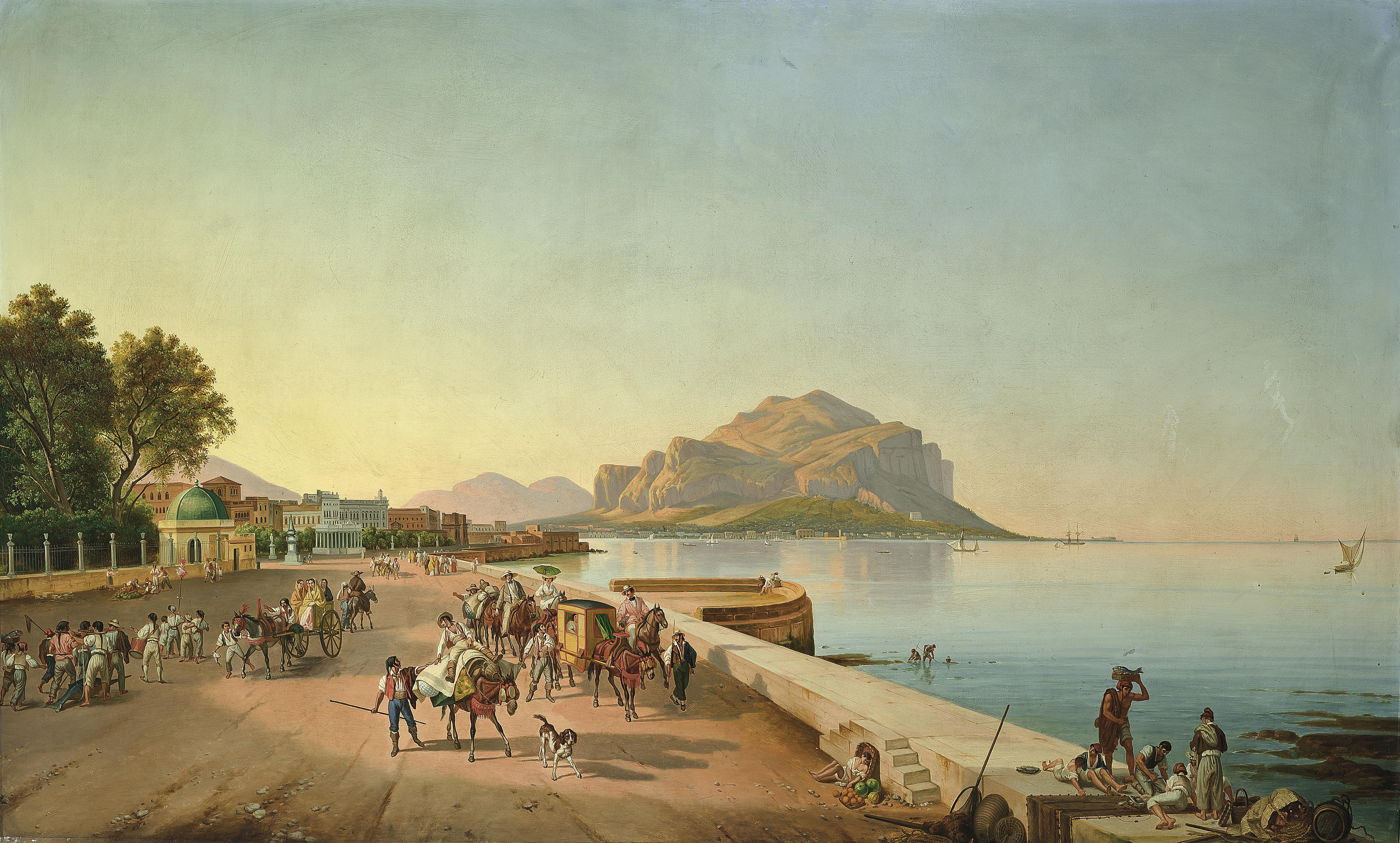
Palermo in the 19th century

After Napoleon's defeat, King Ferdinand IV was restored by the Congress of Vienna of 1815 as Ferdinand I of the Two Sicilies. He established a concordat with the Papal States, which previously had a claim to the land. There were several rebellions on the island of Sicily against the King Ferdinand II, but the end of the kingdom was not brought about until the Expedition of the Thousand in 1860, led by Giuseppe Garibaldi, an icon of Italian Unification, with the support of the House of Savoy and its Kingdom of Sardinia with its economic, political and cultural powerhouse in Northern Italy. The expedition resulted in a striking series of defeats for the Sicilian armies against the growing troops of Garibaldi. After the capture of Palermo and Sicily, he disembarked in Calabria and moved towards Naples, and in the meantime the Piedmontese also invaded the Kingdom from the Marche. The last battles fought were that of the Volturnus in 1860 and the siege of Gaeta, where King Francis II had sought shelter for help, which never came. The last towns to resist Garibaldi's expedition were Messina, which surrendered on 13 March 1861, and Civitella del Tronto, which surrendered on 20 March 1861. The Kingdom of the Two Sicilies was dissolved and annexed to the new Kingdom of Italy, which was founded in the same year.

=== Southern and northern Italy in 1860 ===
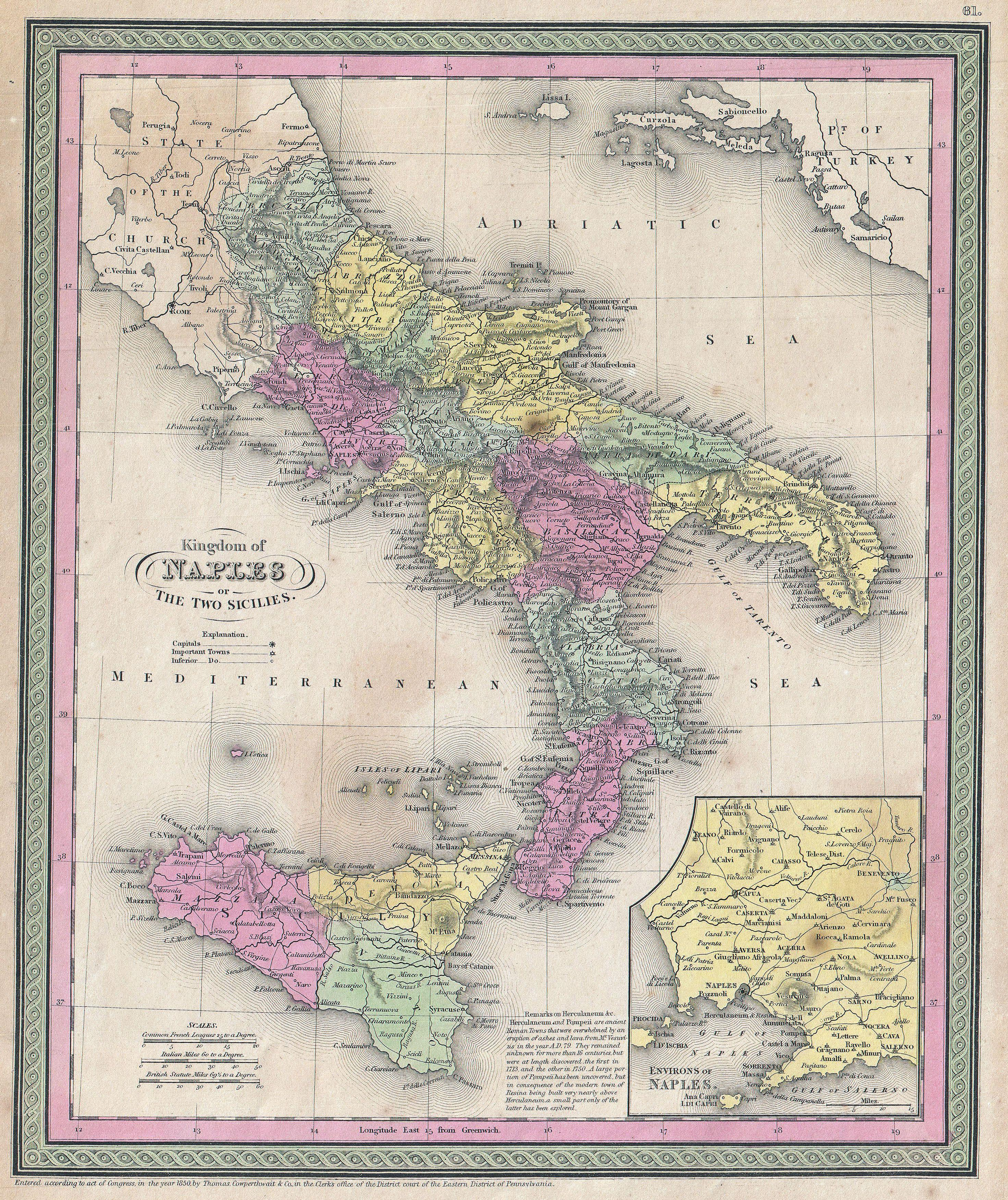
Map of the Bourbon-led Kingdom of the Two Sicilies from 1853, seven years before the annexation by the House of Savoy

At the time of Italian unification, the gap between the former northern states of Italy and the southern two Sicilies was significant: northern Italy had about 75,500 kilometers of roads and 2,316 kilometers of railroads, combined with a wide range of canals connected to rivers for freight transportation; iron and steel production was 17,000 tons per year. By contrast, in the former Bourbon southern state, there were 14,700 kilometers of roads, 184 kilometers of railroads (only around Naples), no canals connected to rivers and iron and steel production was 1,500 tons per year. In 1860, illiteracy rates on the Italian peninsula averaged 75%, with the lowest level of 54% in the northwestern Kingdom of Sardinia (also known as "Piedmont") and the highest in the south, and illiteracy in the Kingdom of the Two Sicilies reached 87%.

Also in 1860, the southern merchant navy amounted to 260,000 tons, and the northern merchant navy came to 347,000 tons, apart from the Venetian Navy, which was annexed in 1866 and assessed at 46,000 tons. In 1860 the whole Italian merchant navy was the fourth largest in Europe at about 607,000 tons. The southern merchant navy was made up of sailing vessels mainly for fishing and coastal shipping in the Mediterranean Sea and had very few steamships, even if one of the first steamers was built and fitted out in Naples in 1818. Both the merchant and the military navies were insufficient compared to the great coastal extent of southern Italy, defined by the Italian historian Raffaele De Cesare: "… a great pier towards the south".

In the article "This is Not Italy! Ruling and Representing the South", it is clear how the northern elites considered the south. The Piedmontese north felt the need to invade the Kingdom of the Two Sicilies and establish a new form of governance based on the northern system, since they viewed the south as underdeveloped and lacking in social capital. Those views of the south can largely be attributed to the letters of correspondents in southern Italy who sent biased letters to leaders of the north, specifically Camillo Benso, urging the invasion and reformation of the south. Although those views of the south were condescending, they also came with a genuine belief that to create a unified Italy, help from the north was necessary. Viewing southern Italy as barbaric served as a sort of justification to allow the "civilized, Piedmontese north" (167) to intervene. Another view, however, was marked by disdain for southern Italy. According to the article, "such manifestations of the south's difference threaten the glowing and gloating sense of northern superiority" (167). These viewpoints clearly indicate the divide between northern and southern Italy in the 1860s.

In an attempt to explain the striking difference between the annexed territory of the former Two Sicilies and the economic and political powerhouse centred in the north, racist theories were postulated, suggesting that such a divide had its roots in the coexistence of two mostly incompatible races. The British historian Denis Mack Smith describes the radical difference between Northern and the newly-annexed southern Italy in 1860 as both halves being on quite different levels of civilization. He pointed out that the Bourbons in the Kingdom of the Two Sicilies were staunch supporters of a feudal system, had feared the traffic of ideas and had tried to keep their subjects insulated from the agricultural and industrial revolutions of Northern Europe.

The study by Mack Smith is confirmed by the Italian historian and left-wing politician Antonio Gramsci in his book The Southern Question by which the author emphasizes the "absolutely antithetical conditions" of northern and southern Italy at the time of Italian unification in 1861, when south and north were united again after more than one thousand years. Gramsci remarked that in Northern Italy, the historical period of the Comunes had given a special boost to history and in northern Italy existed an economic organization similar to that of the other states of Europe, propitious to further development of capitalism and industry, but in southern Italy, history had been different, and the paternalist Bourbon administrations produced nothing of value. The bourgeois class did not exist, agriculture was primitive and insufficient to satisfy the local market, there were no roads, no ports and the few waterways that the region had were not exploited because of the region's special geographical features.

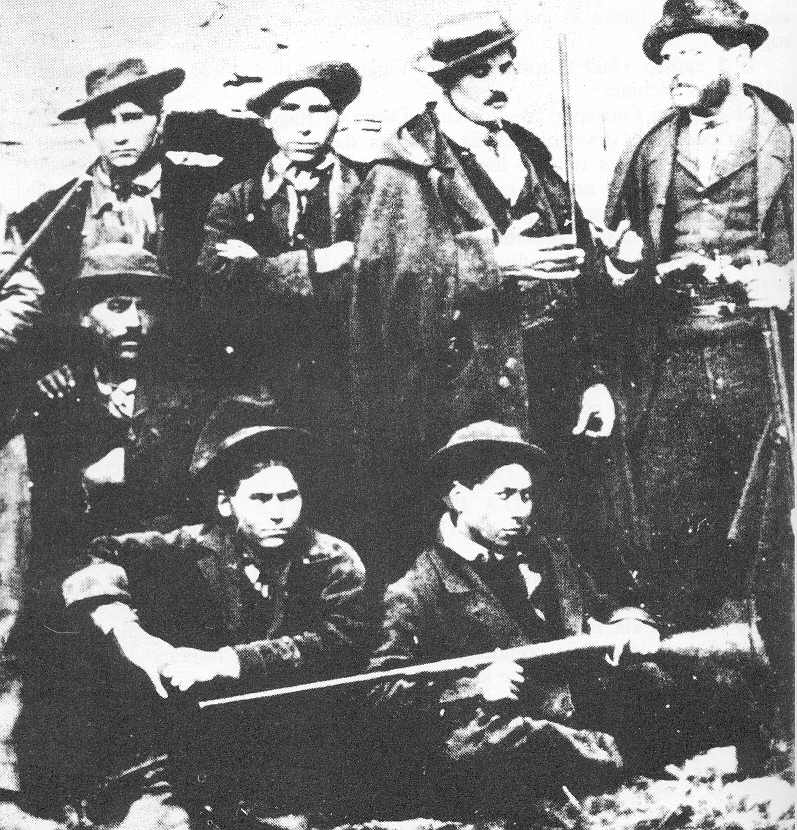
A band of southern Italian briganti ("brigands") from Basilicata, c. 1860

The living conditions of the people of the Kingdom of the Two Sicilies are also illustrated by Raffaele De Cesare, who reported that the King of Naples Ferdinand II had no interest in doing useful works to improve the neglected condition of public hygiene, particularly in the provinces, where scarcity of sewer systems and often water shortages were known issues. The problem of brigandage is explained in the book Heroes and Brigands by the southern Italian historian and politician Francesco Saverio Nitti, outlining that brigandage was endemic in southern Italy, since the Bourbons themselves relied on it as their military agent. Unlike in southern Italy, there was little brigandage in the other annexed states of Northern and Central Italy, like the Kingdom of Lombardy–Venetia, the Duchy of Parma, the Duchy of Modena, the Grand Duchy of Tuscany and the Papal States.

According to the southern Italian historian Giustino Fortunato, and the Italian institutional sources the problems of southern Italy had existed way before Italian unification, and Giustino Fortunato emphasised that the Bourbons were not the only ones responsible for the problems of the south, which had ancient and deep origins in the previous centuries of poverty and isolation, caused by domination by foreign governments. In literature, the period around 1860 was depicted by the Sicilian writer Giuseppe Tomasi di Lampedusa in his famous novel Il Gattopardo (The Leopard), set in Sicily at the time of Italian unification. In a famous final scene, Prince Salina, when invited to join the senate of unified Italy, tells a high-ranking Piedmontese officer that "the Sicilian will never want to change, because the Sicilian feels perfect...". With these and other words, the author underscored the Sicilians' problems of having to change their old lifestyle and remaining on their island. The novel was adapted by Luchino Visconti for his homonymous 1963 film The Leopard.

=== After 1861 ===
The southern economy greatly suffered after the Italian unification, and the process of industrialisation was interrupted. This situation of persistent backwardness in the socioeconomic development of the regions of southern Italy compared to the other regions of the country, especially the northern ones, is known as the southern question. Poverty and organised crime were long-standing issues in southern Italy as well and it got worse after unification. Cavour stated the basic problem was poor government, and believed the solution lay in the strict application of the Piedmontese legal system. The main result was an upsurge in brigandage.

As a result, the south experienced great economic difficulties resulting in massive emigration leading to a worldwide Italian diaspora, especially to North America, South America, Australia and other parts of Europe. Many natives also relocated to the industrial cities in northern Italy, such as Genoa, Milan and Turin. A relative process of industrialisation has developed in some areas of the "Mezzogiorno" after the Second World War. In the 1946 referendum, the region voted to keep the monarchy, with its greatest support coming in Campania. Politically, the region was at odds with the north, which won the referendum to establish a republic.

Into the 21st century, the south remains less economically developed than the northern and central regions, which enjoyed an "economic miracle" in the 1950s and the 1960s and became highly industrialized.

== Demographics ==
Historical population
| Year | Pop. | ±% |
|---|---|---|
| 1861 | 9,631,972 | — |
| 1871 | 10,210,043 | +6.0% |
| 1881 | 11,031,257 | +8.0% |
| 1901 | 12,660,997 | +14.8% |
| 1911 | 13,501,037 | +6.6% |
| 1921 | 14,450,078 | +7.0% |
| 1931 | 14,689,347 | +1.7% |
| 1936 | 15,277,709 | +4.0% |
| 1951 | 17,685,424 | +15.8% |
| 1961 | 18,576,001 | +5.0% |
| 1971 | 18,874,266 | +1.6% |
| 1981 | 20,053,334 | +6.2% |
| 1991 | 20,537,484 | +2.4% |
| 2001 | 20,515,736 | −0.1% |
| 2011 | 20,619,697 | +0.5% |
| 2021 | 19,932,825 | −3.3% |
Source: ISTAT

As of 2026, the population is 19,669,678, of which 49.0% are male, and 51.0% are female. Minors make up 15.0% of the population, and seniors make up 24.4%.

=== Largest cities ===
The most populous cities with more than 50,000 inhabitants are:

| City | Population (2026) | Region |
|---|---|---|
| Naples | 905,050 | Campania |
| Palermo | 626,273 | Sicily |
| Bari | 316,248 | Apulia |
| Catania | 296,984 | Sicily |
| Messina | 216,458 | Sicily |
| Taranto | 185,112 | Apulia |
| Reggio di Calabria | 167,925 | Calabria |
| Cagliari | 145,981 | Sardinia |
| Foggia | 145,078 | Apulia |
| Salerno | 125,323 | Campania |
| Giugliano in Campania | 125,018 | Campania |
| Sassari | 120,231 | Sardinia |
| Pescara | 118,487 | Abruzzo |
| Syracuse | 115,515 | Sicily |
| Andria | 96,520 | Apulia |
| Lecce | 94,387 | Apulia |
| Barletta | 92,067 | Apulia |
| Catanzaro | 82,708 | Calabria |
| Brindisi | 81,181 | Apulia |
| Marsala | 79,521 | Sicily |
| Torre del Greco | 78,839 | Campania |
| Pozzuoli | 74,665 | Campania |
| Corigliano-Rossano | 74,403 | Calabria |
| Ragusa | 74,122 | Sicily |
| Casoria | 73,257 | Campania |
| Caserta | 72,757 | Campania |
| L'Aquila | 70,803 | Abruzzo |
| Altamura | 70,336 | Apulia |
| Gela | 70,109 | Sicily |
| Quartu Sant'Elena | 67,869 | Sardinia |
| Lamezia Terme | 67,005 | Calabria |
| Vittoria | 66,329 | Sicily |
| Cosenza | 63,449 | Calabria |
| Potenza | 63,403 | Basilicata |
| Castellammare di Stabia | 61,937 | Campania |
| Olbia | 61,739 | Sardinia |
| Afragola | 61,581 | Campania |
| Matera | 59,368 | Basilicata |
| Acerra | 58,585 | Campania |
| Crotone | 58,136 | Calabria |
| Caltanissetta | 57,922 | Sicily |
| Marano di Napoli | 57,631 | Campania |
| Molfetta | 57,016 | Apulia |
| Cerignola | 56,711 | Apulia |
| Benevento | 55,330 | Campania |
| Agrigento | 55,118 | Sicily |
| Trani | 54,731 | Apulia |
| Trapani | 54,636 | Sicily |
| Modica | 53,622 | Sicily |
| Montesilvano | 53,557 | Abruzzo |
| Bisceglie | 53,242 | Apulia |
| Bagheria | 53,152 | Sicily |
| Manfredonia | 53,015 | Apulia |
| Bitonto | 52,868 | Apulia |
| Avellino | 51,819 | Campania |
| Teramo | 51,400 | Abruzzo |
| Portici | 51,213 | Campania |
| Acireale | 50,528 | Sicily |
| Mazara del Vallo | 50,070 | Sicily |

=== Immigration ===
As of 2025, immigrants make up 6.7% of the population.

== Economy ==
Map of the southern Italian criminal syndicates

Starting from the unification of Italy in 1861–1870, a growing economic divide between the Northern provinces and the southern half of Italy became evident. In the early decades of the new kingdom, the lack of effective land reform, heavy taxes, and other economic measures imposed on the south, along with the removal of protectionist tariffs on agricultural goods imposed to boost northern industry, made the situation nearly impossible for many tenant farmers, small businesses and land owners. Multitudes chose to emigrate rather than try to eke out a meagre living, especially from 1892 to 1921. In addition, the surge of brigandage and mafia provoked widespread violence, corruption and illegality. Prime Minister Giovanni Giolitti once conceded that places existed "where the law does not operate at all".

After the rise of Benito Mussolini, the "Iron Prefect", Cesare Mori, tried to defeat the powerful criminal organizations flowering in the south with some degree of success; however, when connections between mafia and the fascists emerged, Mori was removed, and fascist propaganda declared the mafia defeated. Economically, Fascist policy aimed at the creation of an Italian Empire and southern Italian ports were strategic for all commerce towards the colonies. Naples enjoyed a demographic and economic rebirth, mainly due to the interest of King Victor Emmanuel III, who was born there.

In the 1950s, the Cassa per il Mezzogiorno was set up as a huge public master plan to help industrialise the south by land reforms creating 120,000 new small farms and by the "Growth Pole Strategy" whereby 60% of all government investment would go to the south to boost the southern economy by attracting new capital, stimulating local firms, and providing employment. The objectives were largely missed, and the south became increasingly subsidised, dependent on the state and incapable of generating private growth itself. In the 21st century, significant regional disparities persist. Problems still include pervasive organised crime and very high unemployment rates. Southern Italy's lack of progress in bettering the area is partially due to record numbers of emigration. The most prevalent issue in southern Italy is its inability to attract businesses and therefore create jobs. Between 2007 and 2014, 943,000 Italians were unemployed, 70% being Italians from the south.

Employment in the south is ranked the lowest when compared to countries in the European Union. Italians from the south are also ranked the lowest in terms of financial contributions into the economy of Italy from immigrants. In southern Italy, the tourism, distribution, food industries, wood furniture, wholesale, vehicle sales, mineral sales and artisan fields are among the leading areas contributing to the projected employment growth. The south heavily relies on tourism in for its economy and attracts tourists through its rich historical background. A report published in July 2015 by the Italian organization SVIMEZ shows that southern Italy had a negative GDP growth in the previous seven years and that from 2000, it has been growing half as much as Greece.

In 2016, southern Italy's GDP and economy was growing twice as much as northern Italy's. According to Eurostat figures published in 2019, southern Italy is the European area with the lowest percentages of employment: in Apulia, Sicily, Campania and Calabria, less than 50% of the people aged between 20 and 64 had a job in 2018. That is largely due to the low participation of women in the workforce, as slightly more than 30% of the women are employed, compared to a national and European average of 53.1% and 67.4%, respectively. In southern Italy, which contains eight cohesion areas (Sicily, Calabria, Campania, Molise, Puglia, Abruzzo and Basilicata), a public–private partnership known as SMEI Italy serves as a catalyst for private investment and supports economic growth and employment creation. Over €1 billion in finance has been catalyzed in these eight locations to far, supporting almost 5 000 SMEs and small mid-caps.

=== Per capita GDP by region ===
Today, Abruzzo is the richest southern Italian the region, and Calabria is the poorest.

Southern Italy regions by GDP per capita (in euro, at current market prices)
| Rank | Region | 2017 | % of nationwide average |
|---|---|---|---|
| 12 | Abruzzo | 25,000 | 86.51 |
| 14 | Basilicata | 21,400 | 74.05 |
| 15 | Sardinia | 20,900 | 72.32 |
| 16 | Molise | 20,100 | 69.55 |
| 17 | Apulia | 18,700 | 64.71 |
| 18 | Campania | 18,500 | 64.01 |
| 19 | Sicily | 17,700 | 61.25 |
| 20 | Calabria | 17,400 | 60.21 |
| — | Italy | 28,900 | 100.00 |

== Culture ==
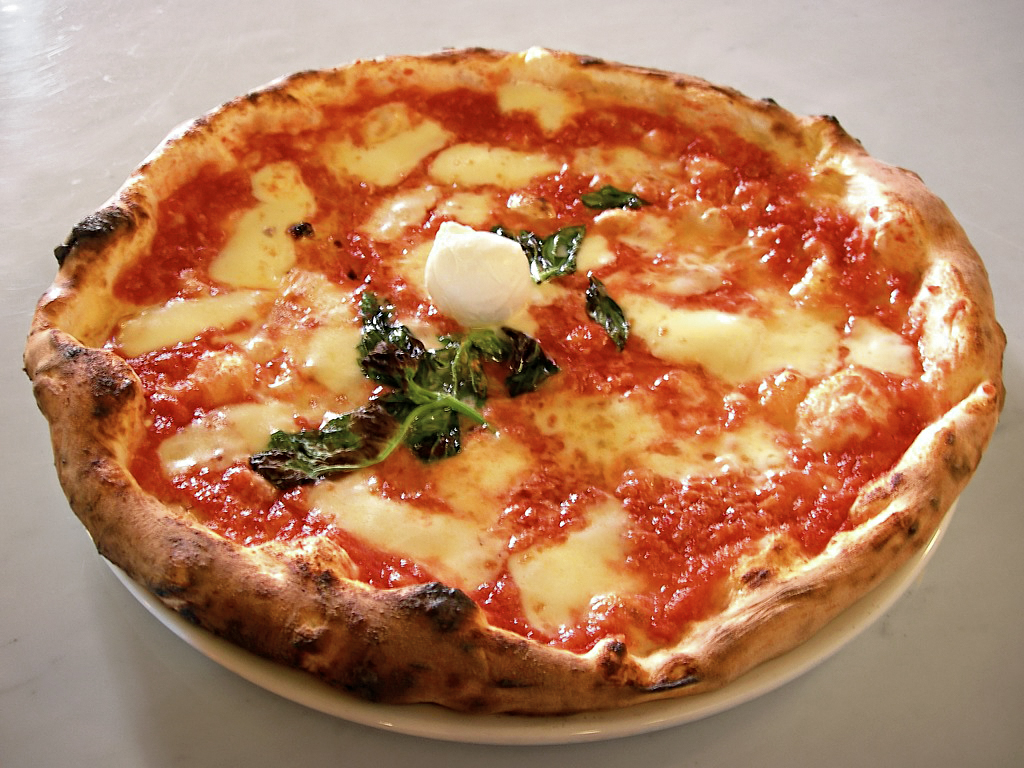
Modern-style pizza, such as the pizza Margherita, originated in Naples

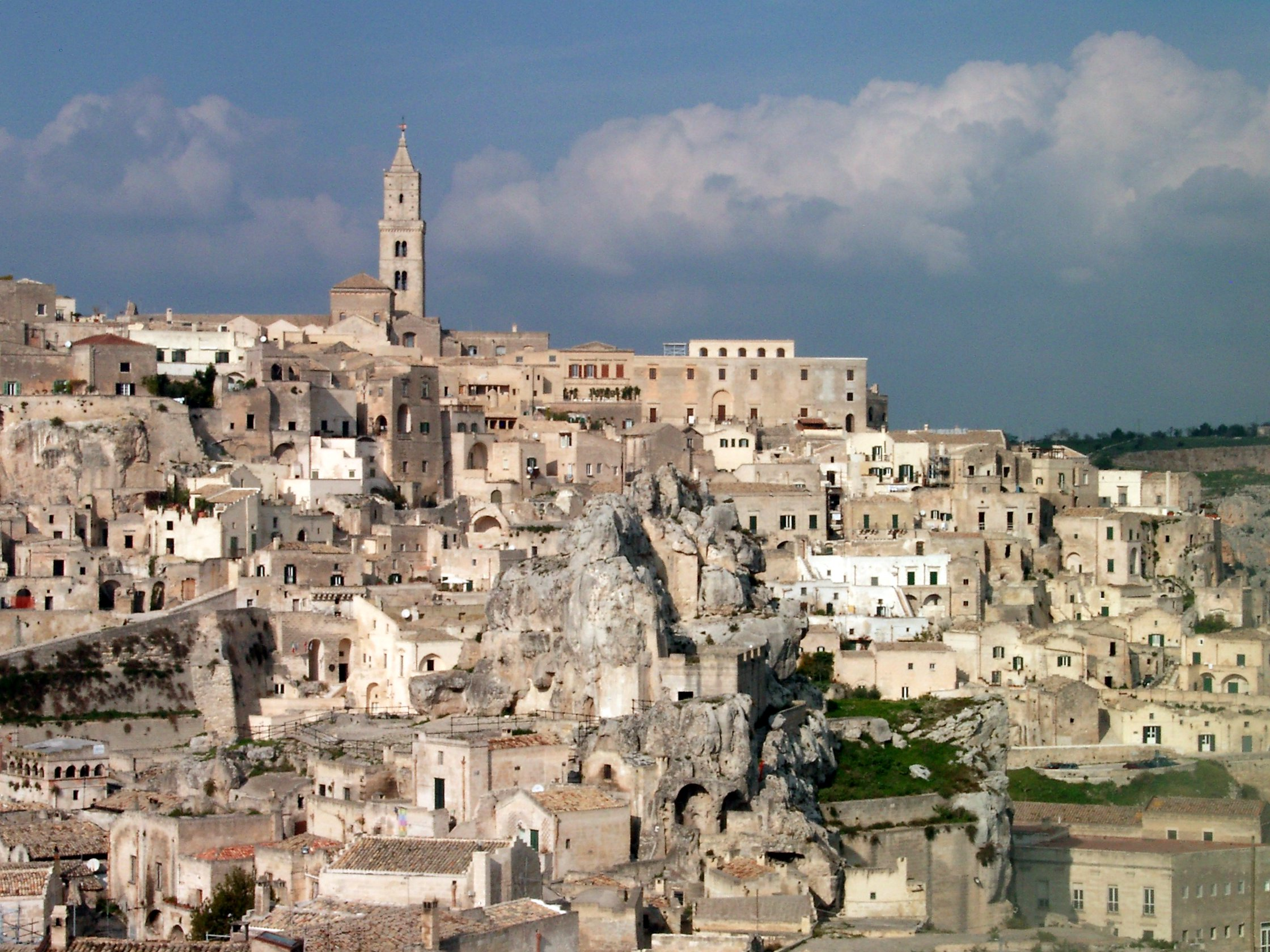
The Sassi di Matera, the first site from Southern Italy to be included in the UNESCO World Heritage List

The regions of southern Italy were exposed to some different historical influences from those the rest of the peninsula, starting most notably with Greek colonisation in Magna Graecia. Greek influence in the south was dominant until Latinisation was completed by the time of the Roman Principate. Greek influences returned by the late Roman Empire, especially following the reconquests of Justinian and the Byzantine Empire.

Sicily, a distinctive Norman–Arab–Byzantine culture throughout the Middle Ages, was captured by Muslims and turned into an Emirate for a period, and elements of Arab culture were introduced via Sicily to Italy and Europe. The rest of the mainland was subject to a struggle of power among the Byzantines, Lombards, and Franks. In addition, the Venetians established outposts as trade with Byzantium and the Near East increased.

Until the Norman conquests of the 11th and the 12th centuries much of the south followed Eastern rite (Greek) Christianity. The Normans who settled in Sicily and southern Italy in the Middle Ages significantly impacted the architecture, religion and high culture of the region. Later, southern Italy was subjected to rule by the new European nation-states, first the Crown of Aragon, then Spain and finally Austria. The Spanish had a major impact on the culture of the south, having ruled it for over three centuries.

Jewish communities lived in Sicily and southern Italy for over 15 centuries, but in 1492, King Ferdinand II of Aragon proclaimed the Edict of Expulsion. At their height, Jewish Sicilians probably constituted around one tenth of the island's population. After the edict, they partially converted to Christianity and some moved to the Ottoman Empire and other places in Italy and Europe. In the 19th century, street musicians from Basilicata, especially the "Viggianesi", began to roam worldwide to seek a fortune, most of them would become professional instrumentalists in symphonic orchestras, especially in the United States.

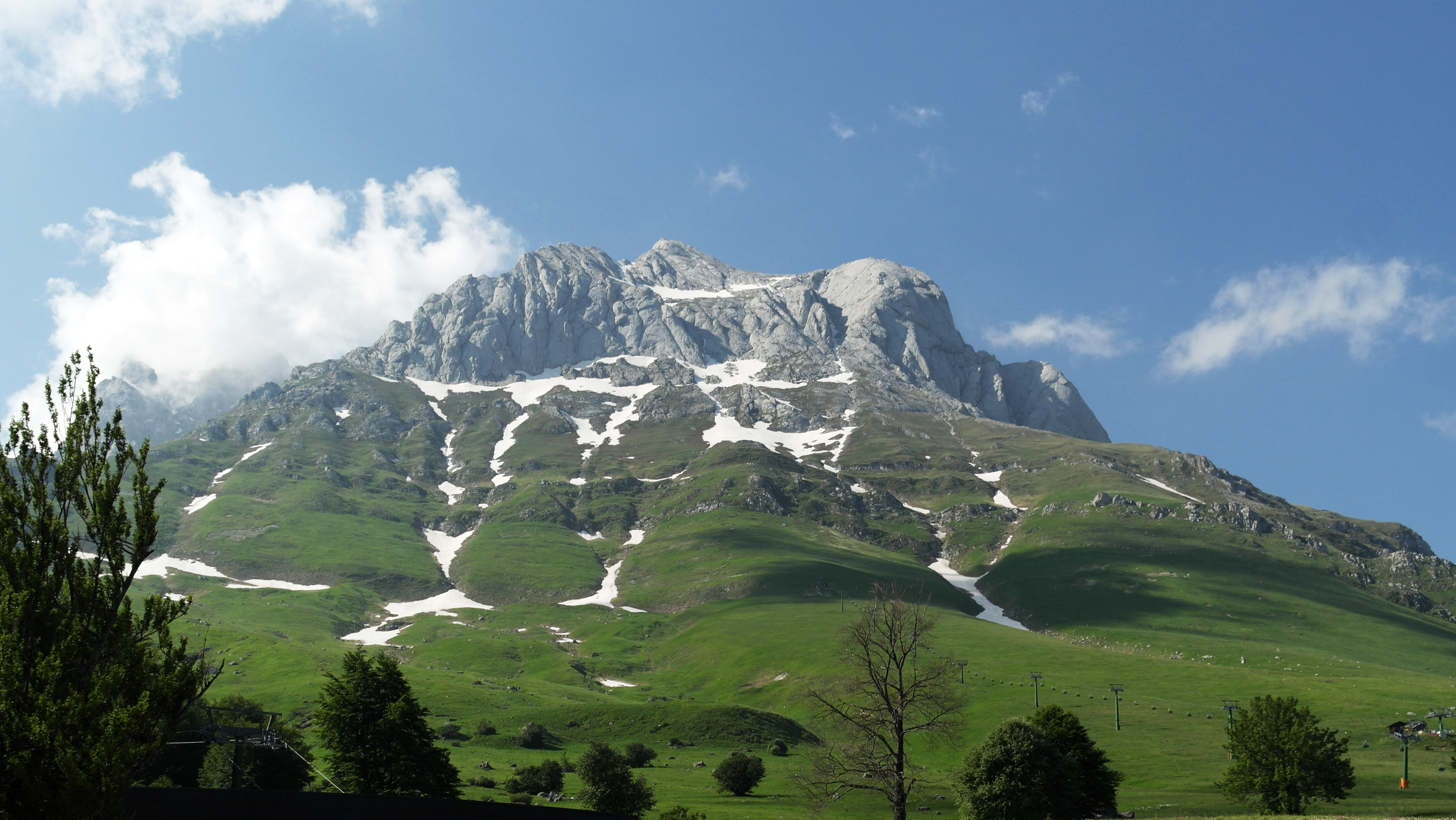
Gran Sasso and Monti della Laga National Park

Southern Italy has many major tourist attractions, such as the Palace of Caserta, the Amalfi Coast, Pompeii, Sassi di Matera, Trulli di Alberobello and other archaeological sites (many of which are protected by UNESCO). There are also many ancient Greek cities in southern Italy, such as Sybaris and Paestum, which were founded several centuries before the start of the Roman Republic. Some of its beaches, woodlands and mountains are preserved in several National Parks; a major example is the Pollino, between Basilicata and Calabria, that hosts the largest national park in Italy. Into the 21st century, southern Italy experienced a revival of its traditions and music, such as the Neapolitan song and the tarantella.

Linguistic borders of the Italo-Dalmatian southern Italian

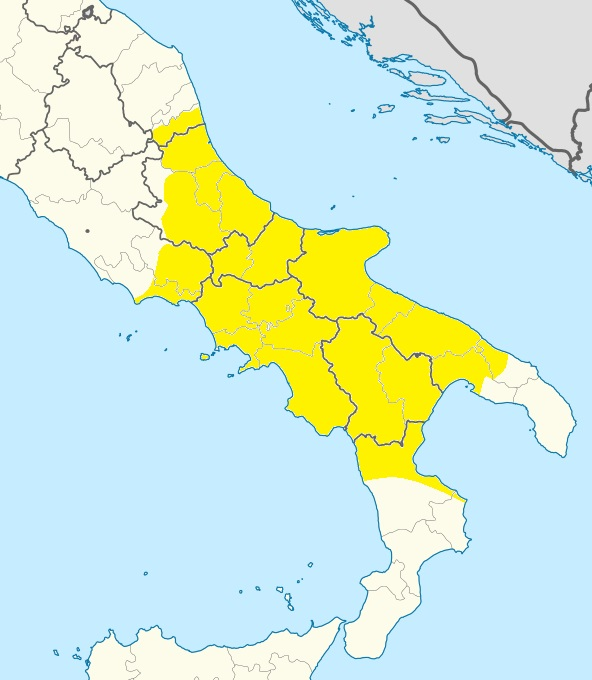
Range of the southern Italian dialects (Neapolitan)

Range of the extreme southern Italian dialects

== See also ==
- National Institute of Statistics (Italy)
- NUTS statistical regions of Italy
- Italian NUTS level 1 regions:
  - Northwest Italy
  - Northeast Italy
  - South Italy
  - Insular Italy
- Northern Italy
- Central Italy
- Meridionalism
- Southern Italy autonomist movements
