= Bovesia =

Coordinates: 37.958°N 15.838°E

Bovesia Ελλάδα της Καλαβρίας/Grècia tis Calavrìa (Calabrian Greek)
- Region
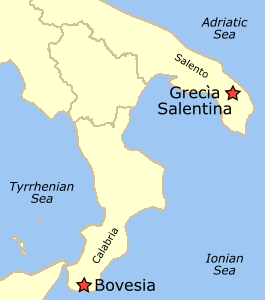
- Location map of the Griko-speaking areas of Bovesia and Grecìa Salentina.

- Location within Italy
- Country: Italy
- Region: Calabria
- Population: 22,636 (2010)
- Demonym(s): Italian: Grecanico; Greek: Γκρεκάνικο
- Time zone: UTC+1
  - Summer (DST): UTC+2

Bovesia, otherwise known as Grecìa Calabra (Calabrian Greece) or in Calabrian Greek: Grècia tis Calavrìa, is one of the two remaining Griko-speaking areas in southern Italy, the other being Grecìa Salentina. It is located at the tip of Calabria, near Reggio, and consists of nine villages. Its population is significantly smaller than that of Grecìa Salentina.

The following villages are part of Bovesia:

- Bova (Calabrian Greek: Chòra tu Vùa)
- Bova Marina (Calabrian Greek: Jalò tu Vunà; 3,979 inhabitants)
- Palizzi (Calabrian Greek: Spyrópoli)
- Palizzi Marina
- Condofuri (Calabrian Greek: Kontochṓri, meaning "near the village")
- Gallicianò
- Amendolea
- Roccaforte del Greco (Calabrian Greek: Vunì)
- Roghudi (Calabrian Greek: Rigùdi)
