= Bowa =

Bowa or Bova (Persian: بواي) may refer to:

Also known as Baba Khaneh:

- Bowa-ye Olya
- Bowa-ye Sofla

== Surname ==
- Larry Bowa (born 1945), American baseball player, coach, and manager

== See also ==
- Bova (disambiguation)
- Odilon Kafitwe wa pa Bowa
