= Capo Spartivento Calabro Lighthouse =

Lighthouse in Palizzi, Calabria, Italy

Capo Spartivento Calabro
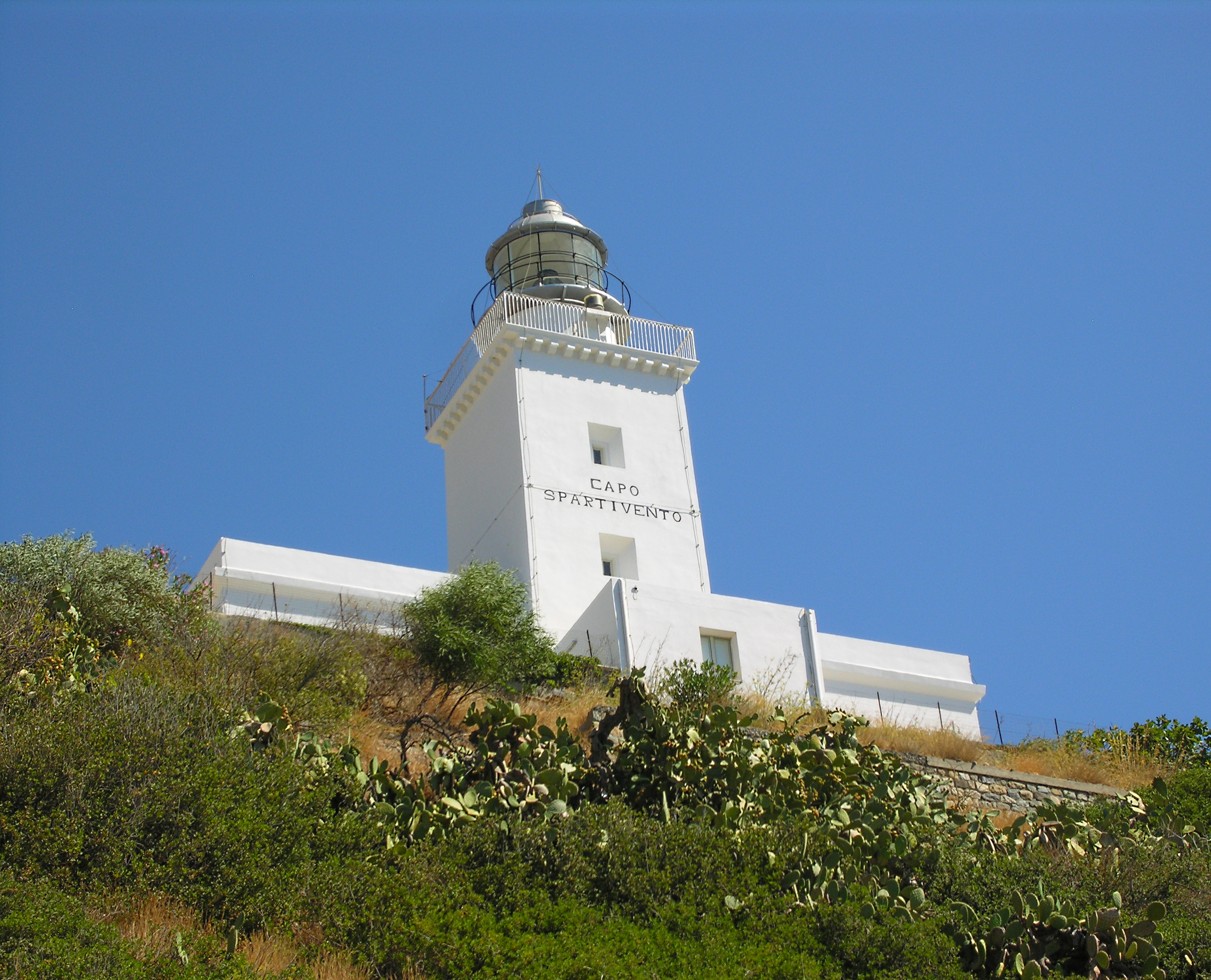
- Capo Spartivento Calabro Lighthouse
- Location: Palizzi; Calabria; Italy
- Coordinates: 37°55′32″N 16°03′39″E

Tower
- Constructed: 1867
- Construction: masonry tower
- Automated: yes
- Height: 15 metres (49 ft)
- Shape: quadrangular tower with balcony and lantern
- Markings: white tower, grey metallic lantern dome
- Power source: mains electricity
- Operator: Marina Militare
- Heritage: Italian national heritage

Light
- Focal height: 63 metres (207 ft)
- Lens: Type OR 375
- Intensity: AL 1000 W
- Range: main: 24 nautical miles (44 km; 28 mi) reserve: 18 nautical miles (33 km; 21 mi)
- Characteristic: Fl W 8s.
- Italy no.: 3384 E.F.

Capo Spartivento Calabro Lighthouse (Italian: Faro di Capo Spartivento Calabro) is an active lighthouse located on the south-easternmost place in Italy in the municipality of Palizzi, Calabria on the Ionian Sea.

== Description ==
The lighthouse was built in 1867 and consists of a white square prism masonry tower, 15 feet (4.6 m) high, with balcony and lantern, rising from, the seaside front, of a 1-storey white keeper's house. The lantern, painted in grey metallic, is positioned at 63 metres (207 ft) above sea level and emits one white flash in an 8 seconds period, visible up to a distance of 24 nautical miles (44 km; 28 mi). The lighthouse is completely automated and is operated by the Marina Militare with the identification code number 3384 E.F.

== See also ==
- List of lighthouses in Italy
- Palizzi
