= Brancaleone, Calabria =

Brancaleone
- Comune
- Comune di Brancaleone
- Location within Italy Location within Calabria
- Coordinates: 37°58′N 16°6′E
- Country: Italy
- Region: Calabria
- Metropolitan city: Reggio Calabria (RC)

Area
  - Total: 35.9 km^{2} (13.9 sq mi)

Population (Dec. 2004)
  - Total: 3,923
  - Density: 109/km^{2} (283/sq mi)
- Time zone: UTC+1 (CET)
  - Summer (DST): UTC+2 (CEST)
- Postal code: 89036
- Dialing code: 0964

Brancaleone is a comune (municipality) in the Province of Reggio Calabria in the Italian region Calabria, located about 110 kilometres (68 mi) southwest of Catanzaro and about 65 kilometres (40 mi) southeast of Reggio Calabria. As of 31 December 2004, it had a population of 3,923 and an area of 35.9 square kilometres (13.9 mi^{2}).

Brancaleone borders the following municipalities: Bruzzano Zeffirio, Palizzi, Staiti.

Famed Italian poet and novelist Cesare Pavese was exiled here in 1935. Portions of his novel The Moon and the Bonfires refer to his time spent here.

== Demographic evolution ==
Historical population

Year	Pop.	±%
1861	1,137	—
1871	1,282	+12.8%
1881	1,421	+10.8%
1901	2,250	+58.3%
1911	2,457	+9.2%

Year	Pop.	±%
1921	2,838	+15.5%
1931	3,364	+18.5%
1936	3,875	+15.2%
1951	4,543	+17.2%
1961	4,245	−6.6%

Year	Pop.	±%
1971	3,915	−7.8%
1981	3,931	+0.4%
1991	4,014	+2.1%
2001	3,882	−3.3%

Source: Data from ISTAT
