= Roghudi =

Roghudi Ροχούδι/Rigùdi (Calabrian Greek)
- Comune
- Comune di Roghudi
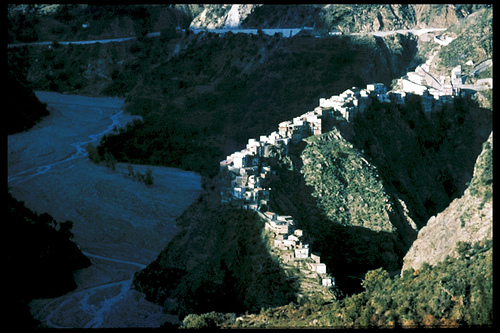
- View of Roghudi Vecchio

- Location within Italy Location within Calabria
- Coordinates: 37°55′N 15°46′E
- Country: Italy
- Region: Calabria
- Metropolitan city: Reggio Calabria (RC)
- Frazioni: Chorio, Rughudi Nuovo, Rughudi Vecchio

Government
  - Mayor: Agostino Zavettieri

Area
  - Total: 36.5 km^{2} (14.1 sq mi)
- Elevation: 55 m (180 ft)

Population (31 August 2012)
  - Total: 1,137
  - Density: 31.2/km^{2} (80.7/sq mi)
- Demonym: Roghudisi
- Time zone: UTC+1 (CET)
  - Summer (DST): UTC+2 (CEST)
- Postal code: 89060
- Dialing code: 0965
- Patron saint: Madonna delle Grazie
- Saint day: 2 July
- Website: Official website

Roghudi (Calabrian Greek: Ροχούδι, romanized: Richùdi, or Rigùdi) is a comune (municipality) in the Metropolitan City of Reggio Calabria in the Italian region Calabria, located about 130 kilometres (81 mi) southwest of Catanzaro and about 20 kilometres (12 mi) southeast of Reggio Calabria.

It consists of two main centers separated by some 40 kilometres (25 mi), the first (Roghudi Nuovo, meaning "new Roghudi" and housing the communal seat) is an enclave in the communal territory of Melito di Porto Salvo, near the Ionian Sea coast; the second, Roghudi Vecchio, is located in the mainland at the foot of the Aspromonte. Roghudi Nuovo was founded in 1973 after two consecutive floods had made Roghudi Vecchio uninhabitable.

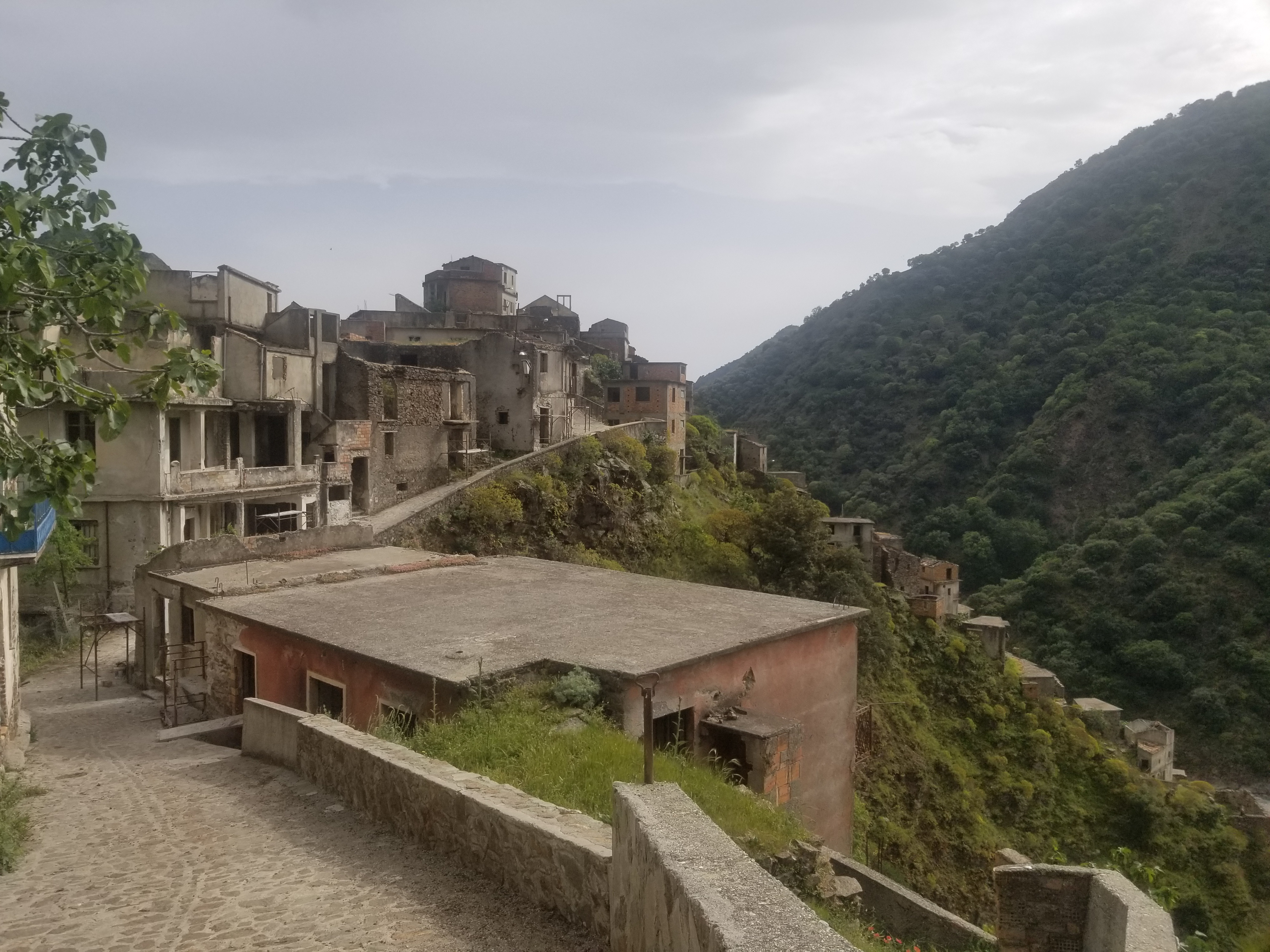
Entrance of Roghudi Vecchio

Roghudi is one of the places where the Greek–Calabrian dialect is still spoken, this being a remnant of the ancient Greek colonisation of Magna Graecia in Southern Italy and Sicily.
