= Bova Marina =

Bova Marina Γιαλός του Βούα/Jalò tu Vunà (Calabrian Greek) A Marìna (Calabrian)
- Comune
- Comune di Bova Marina
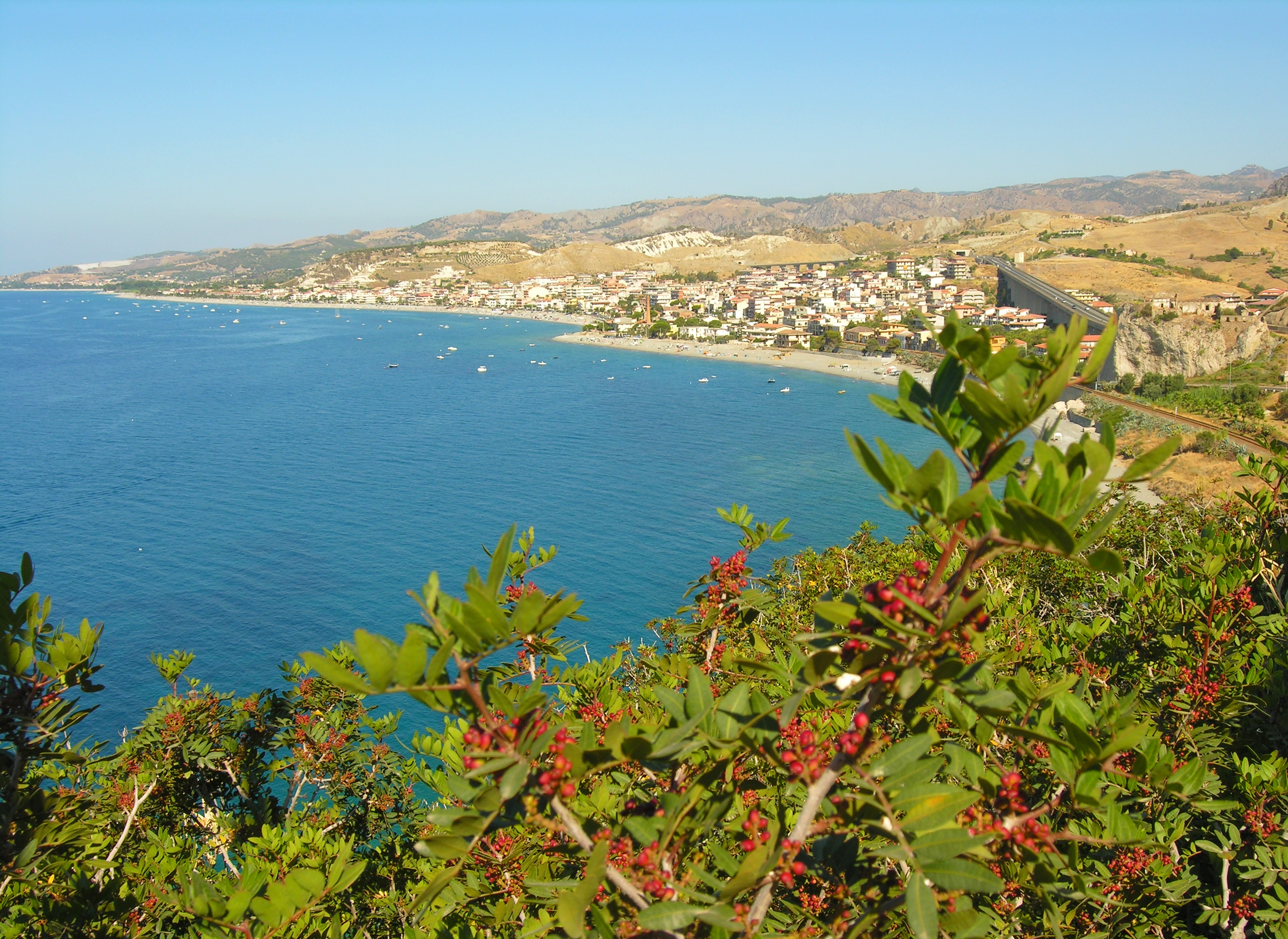
- Panoramic view of Bova Marina

- Location within Italy Location within Calabria
- Coordinates: 37°56′N 15°55′E
- Country: Italy
- Region: Calabria
- Metropolitan city: Reggio Calabria (RC)
- Frazioni: Mesofugna, Amigdalà, Borgo, Centro, Costa dei Saraceni, Apambero, San PasqualeMetropolitan City

Government
  - Mayor: Saverio Zavettieri

Area
  - Total: 29.50 km^{2} (11.39 sq mi)
- Elevation: 20 m (66 ft)

Population (2025)
  - Total: 3,979
  - Density: 134.9/km^{2} (349.3/sq mi)
- Demonym: Bovesi
- Time zone: UTC+1 (CET)
  - Summer (DST): UTC+2 (CEST)
- Postal code: 89035
- Dialing code: 0965
- Website: Official website

Bova Marina (Calabrian Greek: Γιαλός του Βούα, Jalò tu Vunà; Calabrian: A Marìna) is a comune (municipality) in the Metropolitan City of Reggio Calabria in the region of Calabria in Italy, located about 120 kilometres (75 mi) southwest of Catanzaro and about 30 kilometres (19 mi) southeast of Reggio Calabria. It has 3,979 inhabitants.

Bova Marina borders the following municipalities: Bova, Condofuri, Palizzi.

As evidenced by the above Greek place names, Bova Marina is one of the places where the Greek–Calabrian dialect is still spoken, a remnant of the ancient Greek colonization of Magna Graecia (South Italy and Sicily).

== Demographics ==
Historical population

| Year | Pop. | ±% |
|---|---|---|
| 1861 | 854 | — |
| 1871 | 1,109 | +29.9% |
| 1881 | 1,040 | −6.2% |
| 1901 | 2,140 | +105.8% |
| 1911 | 2,639 | +23.3% |
| 1921 | 3,258 | +23.5% |
| 1931 | 3,491 | +7.2% |
| 1936 | 3,801 | +8.9% |

| Year | Pop. | ±% |
|---|---|---|
| 1951 | 4,192 | +10.3% |
| 1961 | 4,068 | −3.0% |
| 1971 | 4,008 | −1.5% |
| 1981 | 3,786 | −5.5% |
| 1991 | 4,371 | +15.5% |
| 2001 | 3,967 | −9.2% |
| 2011 | 4,142 | +4.4% |
| 2021 | 4,080 | −1.5% |

Source: ISTAT

== Main sights ==
In 1983, during excavations for roadwork, the ruins of the Bova Marina Synagogue were discovered. This is the second oldest confirmed site of a synagogue in Italy, the oldest being the ancient synagogue of Ostia Antica near Rome. Parts of the ancient mosaic floor are still intact, which display ancient Jewish symbols, such as the menorah and Solomon's knot.

The building consisted of two square rooms, the first serving as a vestibule. The mosaic floor has a border with a motif of leaves and fruits and contains sixteen squares with geometric designs (the rosette and the so-called "Solomon's knot"), which leave room for the symbols of the menorah (in the centre), of 'ethrog (the cedar) and the palm branch (right) and the shofar (left).
