= Bowa-ye Olya =

Village in Kohgiluyeh and Boyer-Ahmad, Iran

Bowa-ye Olya بواي عليا
- Village
- Location within Iran
- Coordinates: 30°46′37″N 50°28′34″E
- Country: Iran
- Province: Kohgiluyeh and Boyer-Ahmad
- County: Kohgiluyeh
- Bakhsh: Central
- Rural District: Dehdasht-e Gharbi

Population (2006)
  - Total: 139
- Time zone: UTC+3:30 (IRST)
  - Summer (DST): UTC+4:30 (IRDT)

Bowa-ye Olya (Persian: بواي عليا, also Romanized as Bowā-ye Olyā; also known as Bābā Khāneh, Bovā Kohneh, Bowā-ye Bālā, and Bowā-ye ‘Olīyā) is a village in Dehdasht-e Gharbi Rural District, in the Central District of Kohgiluyeh County, Kohgiluyeh and Boyer-Ahmad Province, Iran. At the 2006 census, its population was 139, in 31 families.
