= Bova Marina Synagogue =

Former synagogue in Bova Marina, Italy

- Italian: Sinagoga di Bova Marina
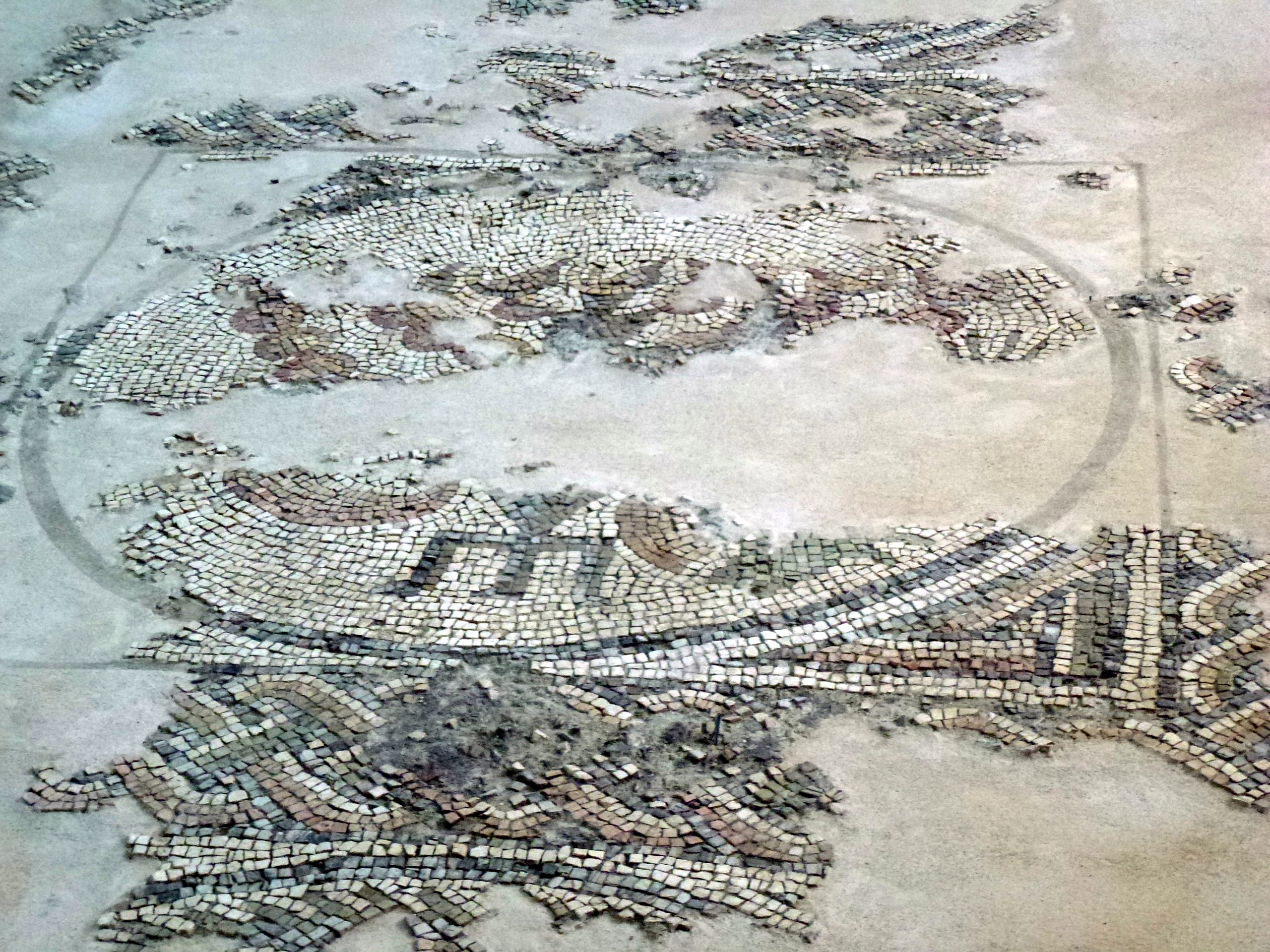
- The archaeological site of the former synagogue, in 2014

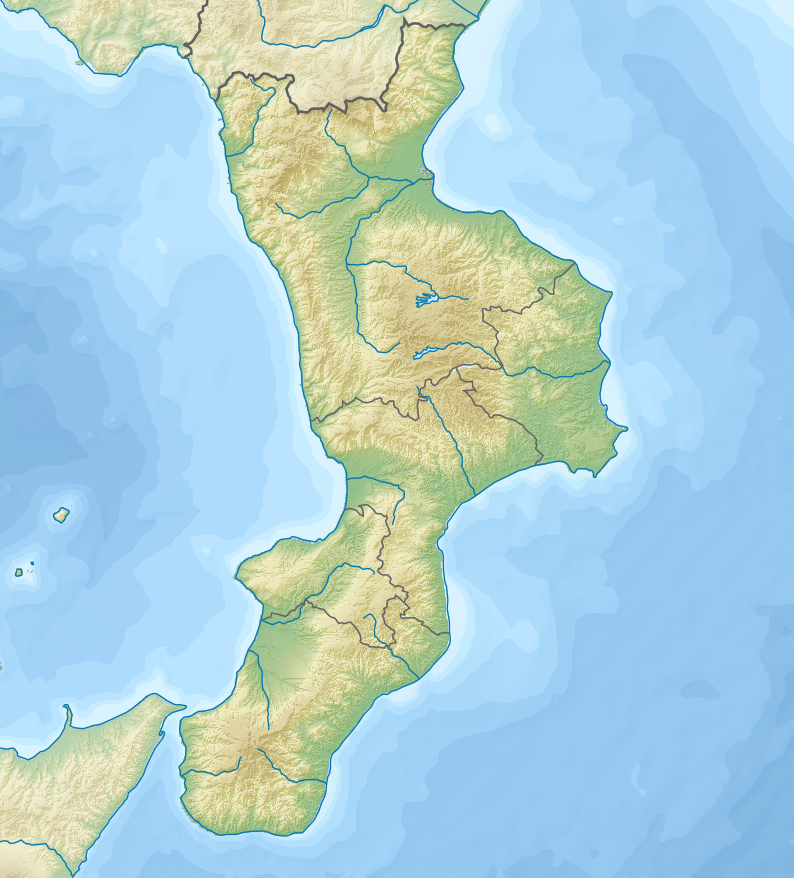
- Location of the former synagogue site in Calabria

Religion
- Affiliation: Judaism (former)
- Ecclesiastical or organisational status: Synagogue (4th century–600 CE); Archaeological site (since 1983)
- Status: Inactive (as a synagogue)

Location
- Location: San Pasquale, Bova Marina, Calabria
- Country: Italy
- Coordinates: 37°55′25″N 15°57′08″E

Architecture
- Type: Synagogue architecture
- Completed: 4th century CE
- Direction of façade: South-east

The Bova Marina Synagogue (Italian: Sinagoga di Bova Marina) is a former Jewish congregation and synagogue, that was located in Bova Marina, Calabria, Italy. It is the second oldest synagogue discovered in Italy and one of the oldest in Europe, dating from the 4th century CE. The former site of the synagogue has been an archaeological site since 1983.

== History ==
Discovered in 1983, the basilica-style synagogue resembles synagogues of the Galilee in the Byzantine period, and features a mosaic floor with images of a menorah, shofar, lulav, and etrog. The site also includes artifacts such as amphora handles with menorah impressions and three thousand bronze coins. The structure was renovated in the 6th century, and appears to have been ceased functioning around 600, when the entire area was abandoned.

Bova Marina means "Bova by the sea", in Italian. Only the Ostia Synagogue is older. The ancient Jewish community of Calabria is one of the oldest in Europe.

The remains of the Bova Marina synagogue were unearthed in 1983 during road construction.

== Description ==
The synagogue was built in the 4th century with renovations dating to the 6th century. There appears to be an older structure beneath the site but trying to reach it would require destroying the ruins. The synagogue is a basilica-style building that resembles the Byzantine synagogues of the Galilee. The building is oriented to south-east. The synagogue appears to have ceased functioning around the year 600 when the entire area seemed to have been abandoned. In addition to the site itself, many artifacts have been discovered such as amphora handles with menorah impressions and three thousand bronze coins.

The site features a mosaic floor with the image of a menorah and accompanying images of a shofar and a lulav to the right and an etrog on the left. In addition, there are other decorative motifs such as Solomon's Knots. There is also a wall niche thought to once contain Torah scrolls.

== Tourism ==
In January 2011, Calabrian newspapers reported increase funding of €600,000 for restoration of the Bova Marina archaeological park. The restoration is part of a regional plan to increase tourism. The project also calls for the opening of a museum to display Jewish artifacts excavated from the site.

Local rabbi Barbara Aiello conducts tours to the site as well as other Jewish heritage sites in southern Italy.

== See also ==
- History of the Jews in Calabria
- History of the Jews in Italy
- List of synagogues in Italy
- Oldest synagogues in the world
