= Dario Bova =

Italian footballer (born 1984)

Personal information
- Date of birth: 31 March 1984 (age 42)
- Place of birth: Caserta, Italy
- Height: 1.86 m (6 ft 1 in)
- Position: Defender

Youth career
- Napoli

Senior career*
Years	Team	Apps	(Gls)
2003–2004	Faenza	17	(0)
2004–2005	Imolese	35	(3)
2005–2008	Cesena	16	(0)
2007	→ Grosseto (loan)	1	(0)
2008	→ Südtirol (loan)	10	(0)
2008–2011	Lucchese	61	(4)
2011–2012	Carpi	5	(0)
2012	→ Melfi (loan)	14	(1)
2012–2013	Aversa Normanna	17	(0)
2013–2014	Lupa Roma	22	(3)
2014–2015	Fidelis Andria	28	(3)
2015–2017	San Marino	68	(8)
2017–2018	Como	30	(1)
2018–2019	Taranto	25	(0)

International career
2005	Italy Mediterranean	1	(0)
- * Club domestic league appearances and goals as of 1 July 2019

Dario Bova (born 31 March 1984) is an Italian footballer.

== Biography ==
=== Early career ===
Born in Caserta, Campania, Bova started his career at the Campania side S.S.C. Napoli. In 2003, he graduated from Primavera under–19 team and left for Serie D side Faenza. After the bankruptcy of Napoli in 2004, he left for Serie C2 club Imolese. With Imolese, he was a regular starter of the team, and earned a call-up to Italy U21 B team for 2005 Mediterranean Games, and for a preparation match against Serie D Best XI. He played the match against Morocco and on the bench against Libya.

He also selected to annual Serie C Quadrangular Tournament, but for Serie C2/B U21 representative team in February 2005.

=== Cesena ===
In July 2005, he was signed by Serie B club Cesena. Although not a regular of Cesena, he also received a call-up from Italy under-21 Serie B representative team in November 2005, for a training camp and against Pro Patria's youth team (Berretti team).

In January 2007, he was loaned to Serie C1 side Grosseto. In January 2008, he was loaned to Serie C2 side South Tyrol.

=== Lucchese ===
In 2008–09 season, he left for Lucchese and won Group D champion of Serie D. In the next season he won promotion to Prima Divisione as Group A champion. Nella stagione seguente continua a rappresentare un punto di riferimento costante nella squadra rossonera che disputa un campionato dignitoso di centro-classifica.

== Honours ==
- Serie C1: 2007
- Lega Pro Seconda Divisione: 2010
- Serie D: 2009 (Group D)
