= Bova, Calabria =

Bova Χώρα του Βούα (Greek)
- Comune
- Comune di Bova
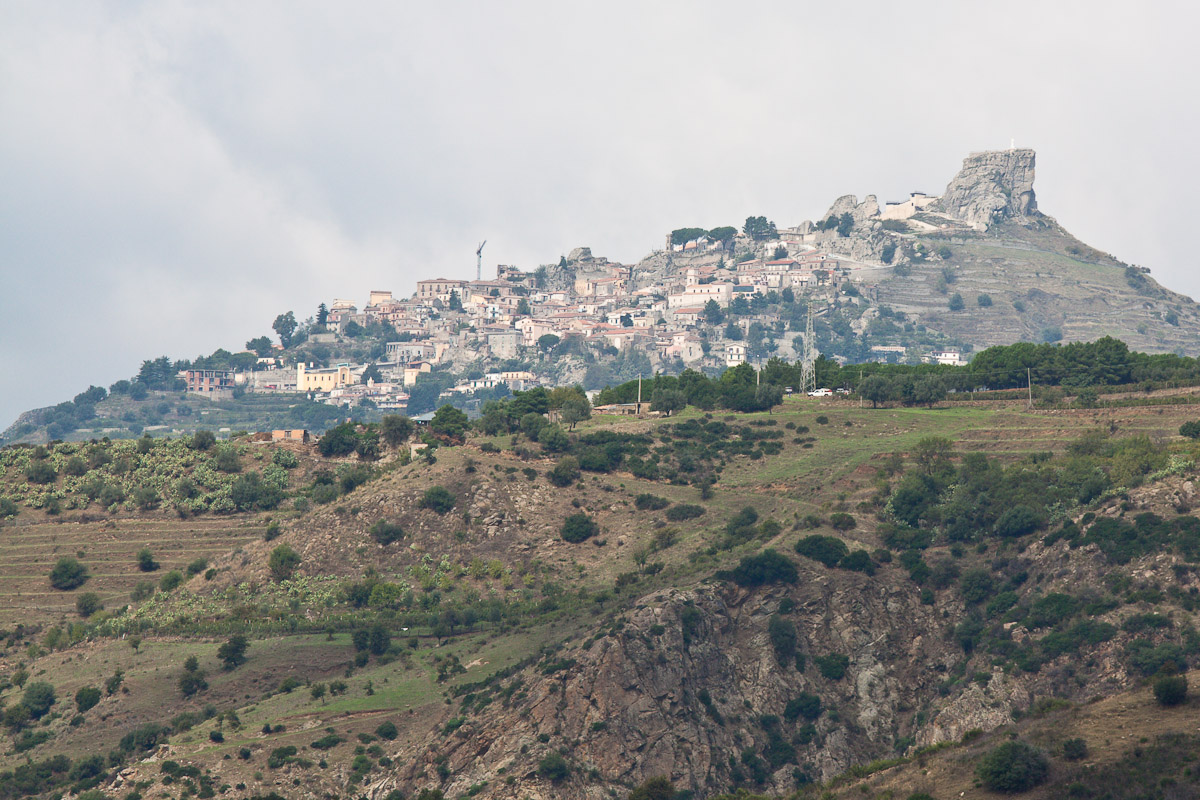

- Coat of arms

- Location within Italy Location within Calabria
- Coordinates: 38°0′N 15°56′E
- Country: Italy
- Region: Calabria
- Metropolitan city: Reggio Calabria (RC)

Government
  - Mayor: Giovanni Andrea Casile

Area
  - Total: 46.9 km^{2} (18.1 sq mi)
- Elevation: 820 m (2,690 ft)

Population (2007)
  - Total: 461
  - Density: 9.83/km^{2} (25.5/sq mi)
- Demonym: Bovesi
- Time zone: UTC+1 (CET)
  - Summer (DST): UTC+2 (CEST)
- Postal code: 89033
- Dialing code: 0965
- Website: Official website

Bova (Calabrian Greek: Χώρα του Βούα, romanized: Chòra tu Vùa; Calabrian: Vùa; Ancient Greek: ὁ Βούας, romanized: ho Boúas) is a comune (municipality) in the Province of Reggio Calabria in the Italian region Calabria, located about 120 kilometres (75 mi) southwest of Catanzaro and about 25 kilometres (16 mi) southeast of Reggio. It is one of the Greek-Bovesian speaking villages of Bovesia, one of the two Griko-speaking areas of southern Italy. It is one of I Borghi più belli d'Italia ("The most beautiful villages of Italy").

== History ==
Archaeological findings have attested human presence in the area to as early as the Neolithic age; in the pre-Roman age, the area was inhabited by the Ausones. Greek colonists founded a city (known as Delia or Deri) in what is now the borough of San Pasquale. This city followed the events of the wars between the major Greek centres in the area, Reggio, Locri and Syracuse, and was later subjected by the latter. After the Roman conquest, it became a town with citizenship rights.

In 440 Delia was ravaged by the Vandals. The unceasing attacks from sea pushed most of the towns in the area to resettle in safer locations far from the coast. The inhabitants from Delia founded the current Bova on a slope of the Aspromonte, at some 900 metres (3,000 ft) in elevation. This did not prevent the Saracens from attacking the town repeatedly and, in 953, from sacking it. Many of its inhabitants were deported, by order of the Sicilian Muslim emir Hassan al-Kalbi, as slaves to Africa. The Arabs besieged Bova again in 1075.

Under the Normans (11th century) Bova became an ecclesiastical fief under the Archbishop of Reggio, who held it until the abolition of feudalism in 1806. In the 16th century Bova's territory received numerous coastal watchtowers as defense against African pirates.

In World War II the town was heavily bombed by the Allies in 1943.

== Demographic evolution ==
Historical population

| Year | Pop. | ±% |
|---|---|---|
| 1861 | 1,813 | — |
| 1871 | 2,356 | +30.0% |
| 1881 | 2,208 | −6.3% |
| 1901 | 2,448 | +10.9% |
| 1911 | 2,293 | −6.3% |

| Year | Pop. | ±% |
|---|---|---|
| 1921 | 2,476 | +8.0% |
| 1931 | 2,375 | −4.1% |
| 1936 | 2,512 | +5.8% |
| 1951 | 2,155 | −14.2% |
| 1961 | 1,893 | −12.2% |

| Year | Pop. | ±% |
|---|---|---|
| 1971 | 1,401 | −26.0% |
| 1981 | 1,175 | −16.1% |
| 1991 | 602 | −48.8% |
| 2001 | 474 | −21.3% |

Source: Data from ISTAT
