= Calabrian Greek =

Variety of Italiot Greek spoken by the Griko people in Calabria

- Γκρίκο
- Native to: Italy
- Region: Calabria
- Ethnicity: Grecanici
- Native speakers: c. 2,000 (2010)
- Language family: Indo-European: Hellenic; Greek; (disputed); Attic–Ionic; Attic; Koine; Italiot; Calabrian Greek
- Writing system: Latin

Official status
- Recognised minority language in: Italy: Calabria

Language codes
- ISO 639-3: –
- Glottolog: aspr1238 Aspromonte
- Linguasphere: 56-AAA-aib
- IETF: el-Latn-u-sd-it78
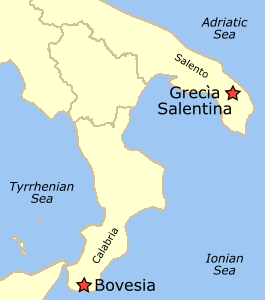
- Location map of the Italiot-speaking areas Grecìa Salentina and Bovesia

Calabrian Greek (endonym: Γκρίκο, Griko; Italian: Grecanico) is the variety of Italiot Greek used by the ethnic Griko people in Calabria, as opposed to the Italiot Greek dialect spoken in the Grecìa Salentina. Both are remnants of the Ancient and Byzantine Greek colonization of the region.

Calabrian Greek is mentioned in the Red Book of UNESCO on endangered languages, together with Griko. In addition, Euromosaic analyses and recognizes it as being an endangered and minority language in the European Union. It is mentioned by Ethnologue as a dialect of Modern Greek in the sense of a modern vernacular language of the Hellenic family (as is the case with Pontic and Tsakonian Greek).

== History ==
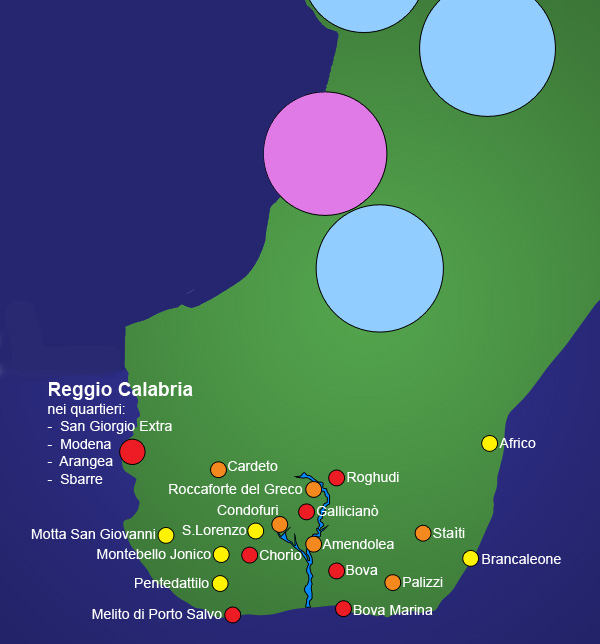
Diffusion of Greek Calabrian during the centuries. Blue: until the 15th century, Violet: until the 16th century, Yellow: until the 19th century, Orange: until the 20th century, Red: current diffusion

The use of Calabrian Greek can trace its roots to the ancient colonies of Magna Graecia. Calabria was once a territory of the Byzantine Empire from 536 AD until it was conquered by the Normans in 1071 AD. During Byzantine rule the territory was referred to as the Catepanate of Italy.

== Distribution ==
Today, Calabrian Greek is spoken in nine towns of Bovesìa including Bova Superiore, Roghudi, Gallicianò, Chorìo di Roghudi, Bova Marina, and the city of Reggio di Calabria, especially in the neighborhoods of San Giorgio Extra and Rione Modena.

Several hundred Griko people continue to speak the Calabrian-Greek dialect in the Arangea and Sbarre neighbourhoods of Reggio Calabria and another small number has been reported in Melito di Porto Salvo, mainly from migration from Roghudi and from Chorìo after the severe floods that occurred there in 1971.

== Characteristics ==
Calabrian Greek has much in common with Modern Standard Greek. With respect to its origins, some philologists assert that it is derived from Koine Greek by Medieval Greek, but others assert that it comes directly from Ancient Greek and particularly from the Doric Greek spoken in Magna Graecia, with an independent evolution uninfluenced by Koine Greek.

The evidence is based on archaisms in this language, including the presence of words from Doric Greek but no longer used in Greece (except in Tsakonian). There are also quite a few distinctive characteristics in comparison with Standard Modern Greek.

For example, in many cases, the final "-s" in most words has been lost (i.e. gaidaros (donkey) becomes gadaro in Calabrian Greek). Moreover, a future tense does not exist in this dialect; it is replaced by the present tense.

Speakers write the language using the Latin alphabet, not the Greek alphabet. The Greek consonants θ and χ are spelled th and ch as in traditional Latin renderings, k is used for κ, and j represents /j/.

== Phonology ==
=== Consonants ===
	Labial	Dental	Alveolar	Post- alveolar	Dorsal
Nasal	m		n	(ɲ)	
Stop	p		t	ɖ	k
Affricate			ts dz	tʃ dʒ	
Fricative	f v	θ ð	s (z)	ʃ	x ɣ
Trill			r		
Approximant			l	(ʎ)	j

- Sounds /n, l/ may be heard as palatal [ɲ, ʎ] sounds when preceding /i/ in /CiV/ positions.
- Velar sounds /k, x, ɣ/ can be heard as palatal [c, ç, j] when preceding front vowels /i, e/.
- /ð/ can also be heard as [d̪] in free variation in initial positions.
- /s/ may be heard as voiced [z] when before a voiced consonant.
- /r/ may be heard as retroflex [ɽ] when within the consonant sequences /tr, tːr/, which can be heard as [ʈɽ, ʈːɽ].
- Nasal+stop clusters may occur and are heard as [ᵐb, ⁿd, ᵑɡ].
- Stop sounds /p, t, ts, k/ may also occur as aspirated as [pʰ, tʰ, tsʰ, kʰ] and sounds /s, ʃ, v, ɣ, m, n, l, r/ may also occur as geminated [sː, ʃː, vː, ɣː, mː, nː, lː, rː].

=== Vowels ===
	Front	Central	Back
High	i		u
Mid	e		o
Low		a	

- /i/ can be heard as a glide [j] when following consonants and preceding other vowels in /CiV/ positions.

== Literature ==
The literature is scarce and consists of books of poetry, local history or calendars, frequently in three languages (Italian, Calabrian Greek and Modern Greek).

In the absence of a linguistic authority, in the late 1970s, the association Jalò tu Vúa initiated a research group to set up methodological standards to teach Calabrian Greek and draft a grammar for the schools. The commune of Bova published it as a pamphlet in 1979 with the title La Glossa di Bova (Bova's dialect).

=== Role in humanism ===
Calabrians were well represented in Humanism and in the Renaissance. Indeed, the Greek scholars of that period frequently came from Calabria, maybe because of the influence of spoken Greek. The rediscovery of Ancient Greek in Western Christianity was very difficult because this language had been almost forgotten. The presence of Calabrian humanists as well as refugees from Constantinople was essential.

The study of Ancient Greek was mainly a work of two monks of the monastery of Seminara: Barlaam, bishop of Gerace, and his disciple, Leonzio Pilato.

Leonzio Pilato, in particular, was an ethnic Greek Calabrian born near Reggio Calabria. He was an important teacher of Ancient Greek and translator, and he helped Giovanni Boccaccio in the translations of Homer's works.

=== Music ===
Calabrian Greek has never had a broad tradition in music, but there are a number of local folk groups that sing in this dialect.

An annual festival called "Palea riza" ("Ancient Root" in both Calabrian and Standard Greek) of world and Calabrian Greek music is held in Bova and other picturesque towns of the area.

== Current status ==
=== Cultural associations ===
Inspired by the efforts of Rohlfs, a group of university students looked to further increase the exposure of this dialect by publishing a pamphlet entitled La Ionica. This was the first organised activity aimed at protecting the language.

In 1970, the group established a cultural association named La Ionica and the pamphlet became a magazine, which contained poetry and prose in both Italian and in Greek Calabrian. The same association established contacts with Greek speakers of Grecìa Salentina aimed at creating the UGIM (Union of Greeks of South Italy) to protect the region's bilingualism jointly and to demand formal state recognition in such areas, such as bilingual road signs.

Following the example of La Ionica, other local associations were established, including Zoí ce glossa (Life and language) in Reggio Calabria, Cinurio Cosmó (New World) and Jalò tu Vúa in Bova Marina, CUMELCA in Gallicianò and Roghudi and Apodiafázi (Dawn) in Bova Superiore.

=== Mass media ===
There are two periodicals in Calabrian Greek: I Riza, which is trilingual (Italian, Calabrian Greek and Modern Greek) and published by the Jalò tu Vúa association, and CUMELCA. The former is a four-monthly publication, and the latter is supposed to be published every three months but is irregular. The region gives some financial aid to support the publications.

No radio stations broadcast in Calabrian Greek, mostly because of the crisis of the local private radio stations. Between 1977 and 1984, coinciding with the boom in local stations, some stations aired programs in this language. Among them were the Radio Antenna Don Bosco at Bova Marina, Radio San Paolo at Reggio di Calabria and RTM at Mélito di Porto Salvo. The dialect has never been used on television.

=== Education and raising awareness ===
The Greek government in Athens, by the Associazione Internazionale degli Ellenofoni (SFEE) or the International Association of Greek-speakers, has established relations with La Ionica and has officially invited Calabrian Greeks at the annual meetings they host in Greece. Apart from that, La Ionica has not been well supported by government public institutions; awareness of this problem has really surfaced in only the last few years.

The region of Calabria has encouraged the education of the dialect in schools, along with what already happens regarding Albanian, thus promoting bilingualism. In 1993, the region also created an Istituto Regionale Superiore di Studi Ellenofoni (Regional Institute of Advanced Hellenophonic Studies), based in Bova Marina.

Despite the initial activity, the program has not made many advances because of the lack of qualified teachers and the fact that bilingualism is not present in administration. The improvements are very small and at the moment, for example, only the towns of Bova and Bova Marina have bilingual street signs.

The gradual decline in the use of Greek Calabrian is mainly from the population viewing it as nothing more than a dialect, a form of expression of the lower classes that is typical of rural and/or illiterate peoples. The lack of linguistic registers (use in environments other than at a familiar level) is a further impediment to its survival.

The language was preserved while the population remained isolated in the mountains of the Aspromonte. Following the migrations from the zones of the bulk of the population, the younger generations of today have only a very basic knowledge of the language. Also, improved education standards encourage the use of other languages, such as Italian, even on a day-to-day basis.

Activity in the area of education, even if it is supported by local administration and legislation in promoting the presence of Greek in the classroom and in universities, is limited because lecturers and tutors with an adequate knowledge of Greek Calabrian are not available to offer courses. Initial activity has been limited to the initiatives of cultural groups at a local level, with the financial support of the odd local council.

The teaching of the language in schools has not followed a bilingual format but has been offered more as an optional subject at primary school level, thanks to the financial support of the regional government and the European Community. Student numbers have remained quite low.

The teaching of the language is completely absent at the secondary school level. Still, the cultural associations offer courses aimed at adults.

Thus, the biggest problem remains the limited knowledge of the language on the part of the teaching fraternity for which bilingualism is not a mandatory element of their qualification. Some further education of such graduates is offered by the odd cultural association such as Jalò tu Vúa but only by the support of the European Community. That association has even worked towards the creation of a Greek Calabrian grammar.

== See also ==
- Byzantine Italy
- Griko dialect
- Griko people
- Magna Graecia
