= Marcello Sparzo =

Italian sculptor of the 17th century, renowned particularly as a master plasterer

- Born: 16th century Urbino, Italy
- Died: 1616; Urbino, Italy
- Occupations: Sculptor, plasterer

Marcello Sparzo (c. 16th century – 1616) was an Italian sculptor of the 17th century, renowned particularly as a master plasterer.

Considered by his contemporaries as one of the foremost plastic artists and sculptors of the period, he was among the early users of marble plaster in monumental colossal works, displaying an original stylistic language and refined execution skills. He worked notably in Genoa, Urbino, Turin, Siena, and Pavia, and was also an innovator in chromatic experiments, for instance, in the presbytery of the Church of San Pietro in Banchi, the nave of the Church of San Rocco, and the Villa of the Prince in Genoa.

== Biography ==
=== Early life ===
Marcello Sparzo was born in Urbino, Italy to Francesco di Giulio Sparzo and Donna Giulia. Luigi Pungileoni described him as "the natural son of Gio. Antonio Spazza." In the contract of 1573 for works in Siena, he is referred to as "Master Marcello di Giulio Sparti from Urbino." He spent his early years specializing in plastic arts at the school of Federico Brandani, developing an original style in the tradition of Mannerism of Raphael and Perino.

=== Professional career ===
==== Siena ====
After possibly working in Rome with Brandani in 1573, he was summoned to Siena, where he was entrusted with various commissions. He collaborated, alongside the Flemish painter Bernard van Rantwyck, on the elaborate stucco decorations of the Palazzo Chigi alla Postierla, which have survived in eleven rooms to this day. His works instigated a specific stylistic trend in the Tuscan city concerning ornamentation, which endured for over a century.

==== Pavia ====
In 1578, he was called to work at the chapel of the Rosary in the Dominican church of San Tommaso, initially to replace the deceased Ambrogio Volpi, completing the commissions by 1583. In 1588, he created the elaborate sculpture ensemble depicting the saints of the Dominican order. In 1596, Sparzo signed a new contract to decorate the two vaults in front of the Rosary chapel. In his Historia of 1602, Spelta described him as "one of the first stucco workers of these times" (using the word "first" with the antique meaning of "most important") and credited him with a grandiose statue of Victory from 1599. The statue, "gracefully formed" and "perfectly executed," stood on a base in a Corinthian niche, near the third city gate, in the then Piazza San Gabriele. The figure was winged, armed in ancient style, crowned with laurel, holding a palm branch in the right hand, and a staff in the left. The monument was among the ornaments used to welcome Queen Margaret during her visit to the city, and later on preserved by the noble Silvio Salvatico. Sparzo's last recorded work in Pavia was "a painting with figures, and armed in stucco," payment for which is recorded on 1 May 1600.

==== Genoa ====
Meanwhile, he had moved to Genoa, where his presence is documented at least from 1579. Here, he was a significant pioneer in the use of plaster, a material previously unfamiliar to the Genoese tradition. After the departure of Bergamasco, plastic art reached its highest levels with Sparzo in Genoa, so much so that it "competed with marbles", according to Alizeri. In the Genoese capital, he worked extensively in civil buildings and churches, including those of San Bartolomeo degli Armeni, San Rocco di Granarolo, San Pietro in Banchi, and San Francesco di Castelletto. Among his early Genoese works were those at Villa delle Peschiere, with Domenico Ponzello, Bernardo Castello, and Giovanni Carlone, where he sculpted statues, stuccoes, and the splendid bath in a style already praised by Giorgio Vasari during his visit. Particularly significant were the works executed for the noble family of Doria. It was Gianandrea Doria who commissioned from him the monumental Statue of Jupiter, known as il gigante (the giant), dedicated to the prince-admiral Andrea Doria. The colossal statue, dating back to 1586, stood eight meters tall and was carved in a Mannerist style; it was located in the northern gardens of the Villa del Principe. It loomed over the valley and the harbor for 350 years, until 1935/1936, when it was even demolished because, according to the authorities, it was "bulky, and because the municipality, despite being requested, neglected to deal with it". According to Federico Alizeri, the statue was of such quality as to deserve "a praise that is very difficult for anyone who sculpts or models: that is, giving the right appearance to the colossi according to the place that receives them and according to the point from which they are intended to be viewed". In the monumental villa of the Prince Doria, Sparzo also adorned the premises with polychrome stuccos, vaults, the famous golden gallery, and the chapel.

Between early 1589 and 1591, he worked in the Urbino Cathedral with Fabio Viviani, where he was also called as an expert, and later completed the work alone after Viviani's death in 1590, sculpting the four statues of Solomon, Elijah, David, and Melchizedek. Again at the initiative of the Doria family, in 1590, he executed the six statues for the church of Sant'Agostino in Loano. In 1592, he worked on the chapel in the Church of Our Lady of Grace in Pegli.

After his aforementioned return to the Certosa di Pavia between the 16th and 17th centuries, in 1602 he worked at the Villa Imperiale Scassi, richly decorating the atrium and sculpting the statues in the niches, including those depicting Doge Tartaro in the staircase, considered particularly valuable. In 1603, he oversaw the works in San Pietro in Banchi in Genoa, adorning the dome with stuccoes depicting the Passion of Christ, one of his masterpieces. In 1606, he worked at Palazzo Lomellino on Strada Nuova, creating masterful stuccoes for the facade and oval atrium, based on designs by Giovan Battista Castello. In the same year, he completed the rich works at the church of San Rocco di Granarolo, dated and personally signed by Sparzo, with decorations, statues, and various compositions. In 1608, he worked at Palazzo Madama in Turin, overseeing various decorations and stucco coverings. Finally, between 1613 and 1614, he was involved in "adorning the vault and other parts" of the church of San Francesco di Paola in his native Urbino.

=== Later years and death ===
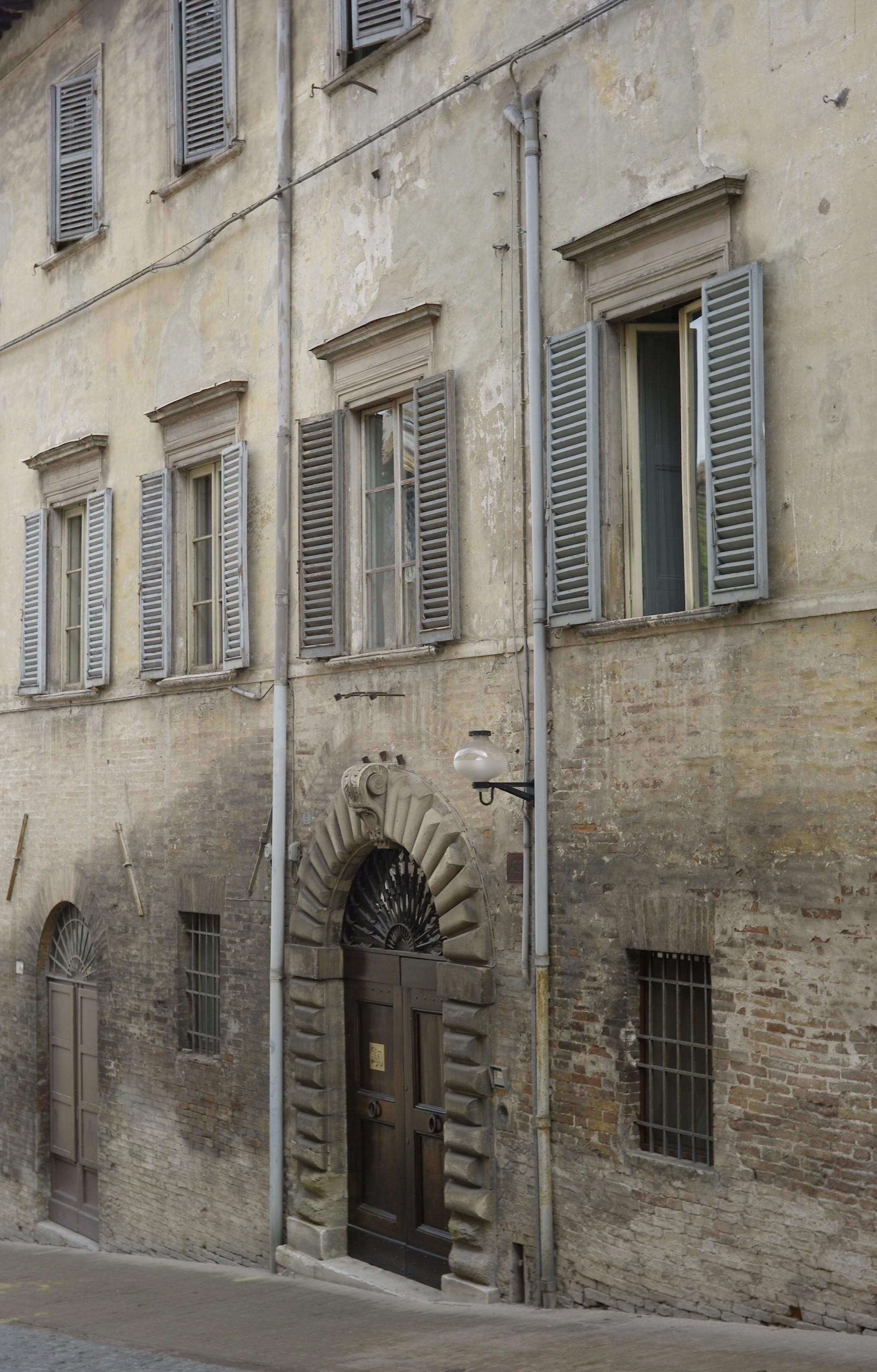
The palace Sparzo bought in Urbino and sold to Antonio Viviani shortly before his death

On January 23, 1614, he bought from the community, in the district of Valbona in Urbino, what had been the house of Federico Brandani, committing to pay it in two installments with the proceeds from the works at the church of San Francesco, later reselling it two years later for six hundred scudi to the painter Antonio Viviani, and is now the headquarters of the Accademia Raffaello. On November 1, 1616, near his death, he wrote his will expressing his wish to be buried in the church of San Francesco in Urbino. He lived a very long life and died, according to Soprani, almost a centenarian.

== Family ==
During his long stay in Liguria, Sparzo may have become the brother-in-law of the sculptor Filippo Pippo Santacroce, although details about his life, as noted by Lazzari-Colucci in the 18th century, are conflicting due to inaccuracies by early biographers such as Oddi and Soprani (who, according to Lazzari-Colucci, confused two individuals with similar names). Biographically, Soprani attributes to Sparzo a son who allegedly died in infancy (although the reconstruction appeared fictionalized and was indeed omitted by Ratti in 1768). On the other hand, Negroni indicates him as married to Francesca di Pierino de Strozzis de Varso, and Lazzari-Colucci indicate him as married to Federica da Genova and father of Pier' Antonio (born on June 19, 1591, in Urbino, married to Virginia, niece of Filippo Bellini, and died childless). In Lazzari-Colucci's text, there is, however, an inconsistency: in the biographical entry on Marcello Sparzo, Virginia Bellini is stated as the wife of his son Pier' Antonio, while in the entry on Carlo Bellini (Filippo's brother), Virginia is stated as the wife of Marcello himself.

== Legacy ==
Sparzo's contemporaries have passed down the image of a very well-known, prolific, influential, and appreciated artist who became wealthy thanks to his own work. In the centuries following his death, however, as already suggested by Lazzari-Colucci at the end of the 1700s and by Alizeri in the 1800s, his name and his works suffered unfortunate fates: the inaccuracies of biographers (who called him by different names, among them: Spazi, Sparza, Spurzio, Spargio, Sparsi, Spassi, Sparti, Sparzi, Sparzio, Sparci or, in Latin, Marcellus Sparsus, Marcelus de Spartiis, and Marcelo de Sparcio), attributions of his works to others, the insults of time on materials, his pioneering role in the stucco technique long considered minor compared to sculpture, neglect by posterity (to the point of demolishing some of his works including the centuries-old colossus or the works in San Bartolomeo degli Armeni and in the church of Santa Sabina), and finally, the damage suffered by some works during the bombing of Genoa in World War II, contributed for a long time to the incomplete recognition of Sparzo's work and in part to his oblivion. His colossus of Jupiter, for example, was attributed to Giovanni Angelo Montorsoli for two centuries and the reattribution of the work occurred only in 1874 (Alizeri, initially also mistaken, corrected himself, giving it prominence in his publications).

It was only in the 19th century, thanks also to the publications of Colucci, Lazzari, and Alizeri, and later to modern analysis, that Sparzo's extensive artistic work began to be gradually recognized as it was by the people of his era.

== Gallery ==
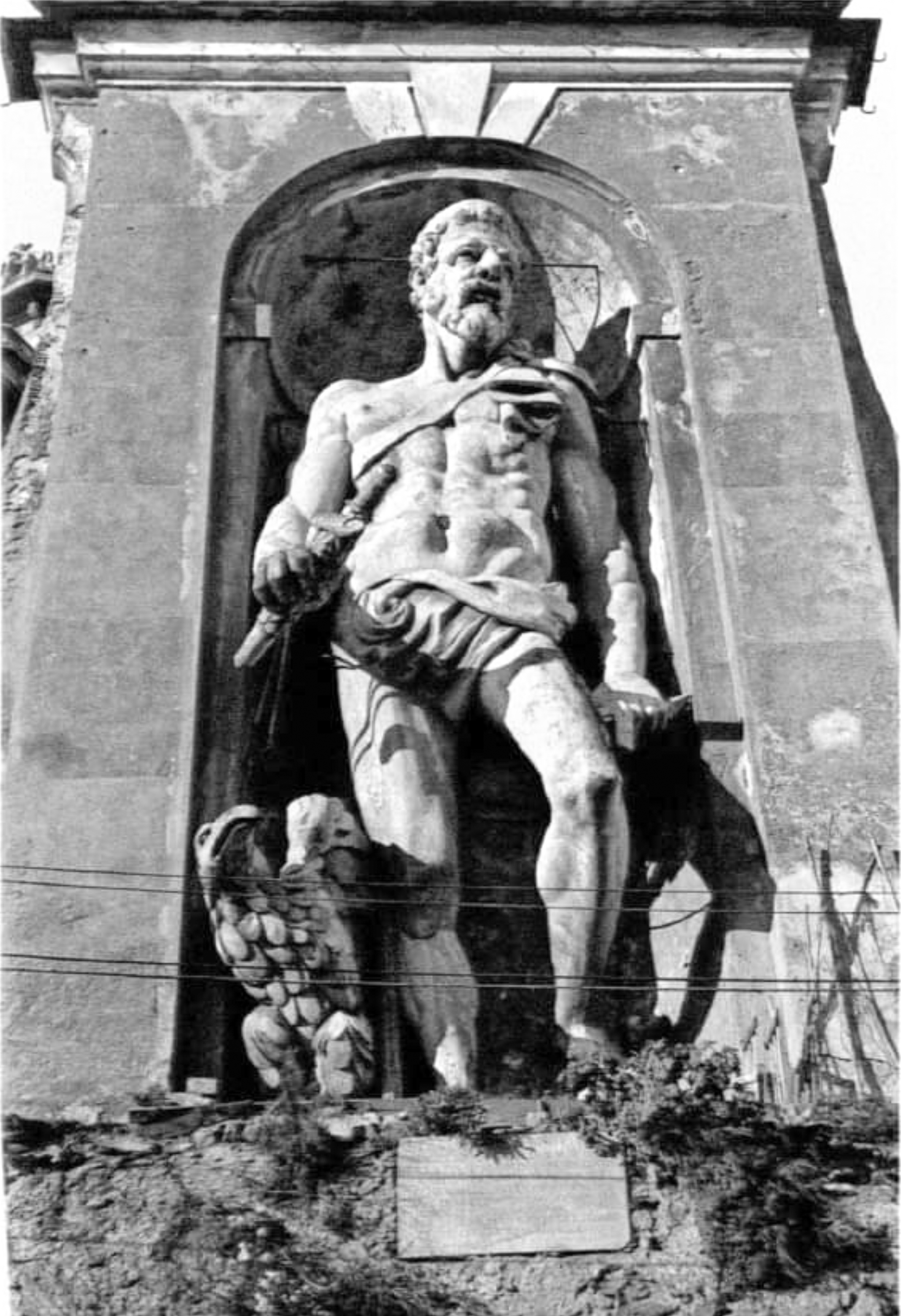
The Colossus by Sparzo of Jupiter with an eagle at its feet, the heraldic symbol of the Doria.

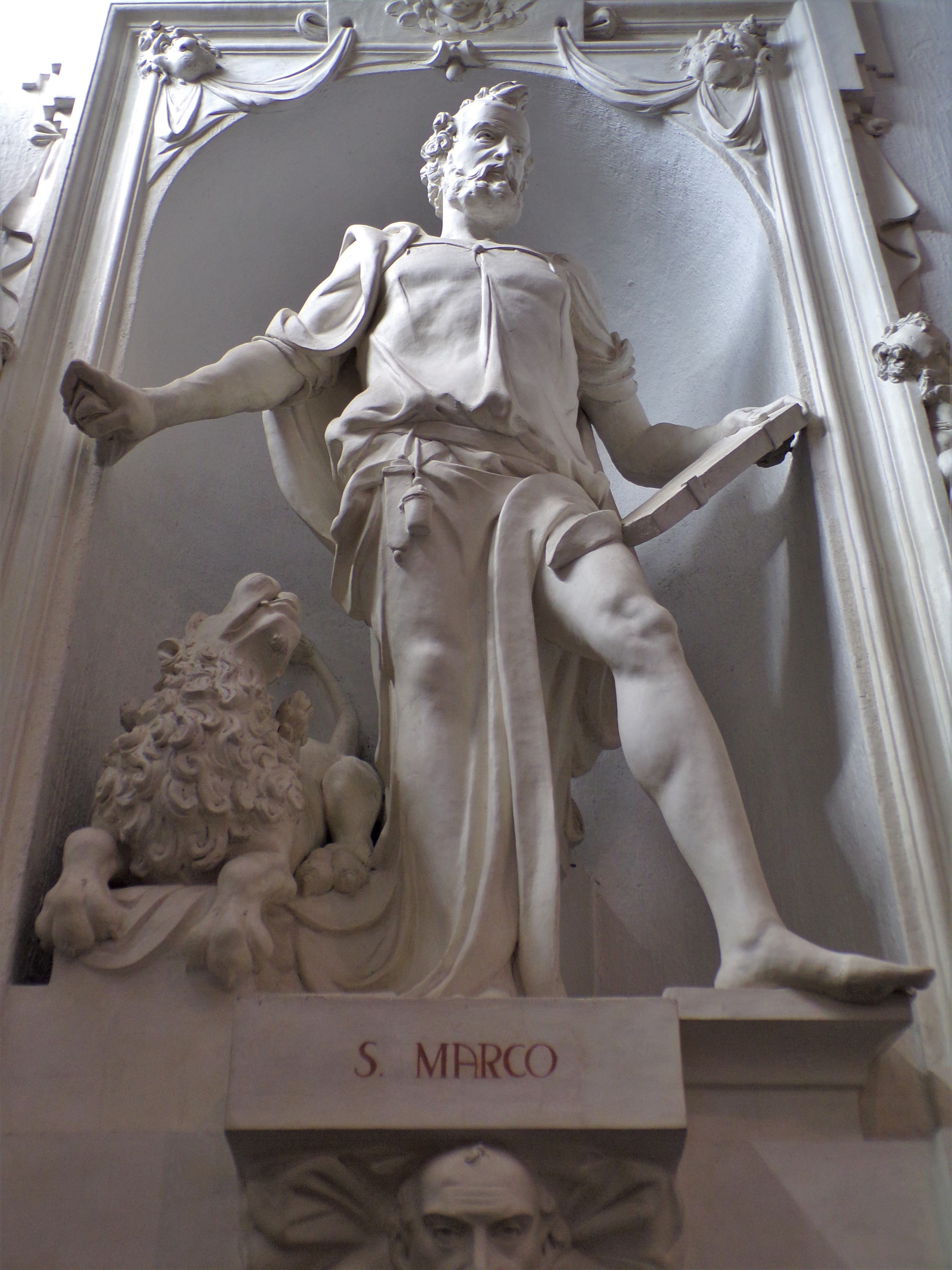
Statue of Mark the Evangelist with a lion, decorated with drapes, volutes, and cherubs.

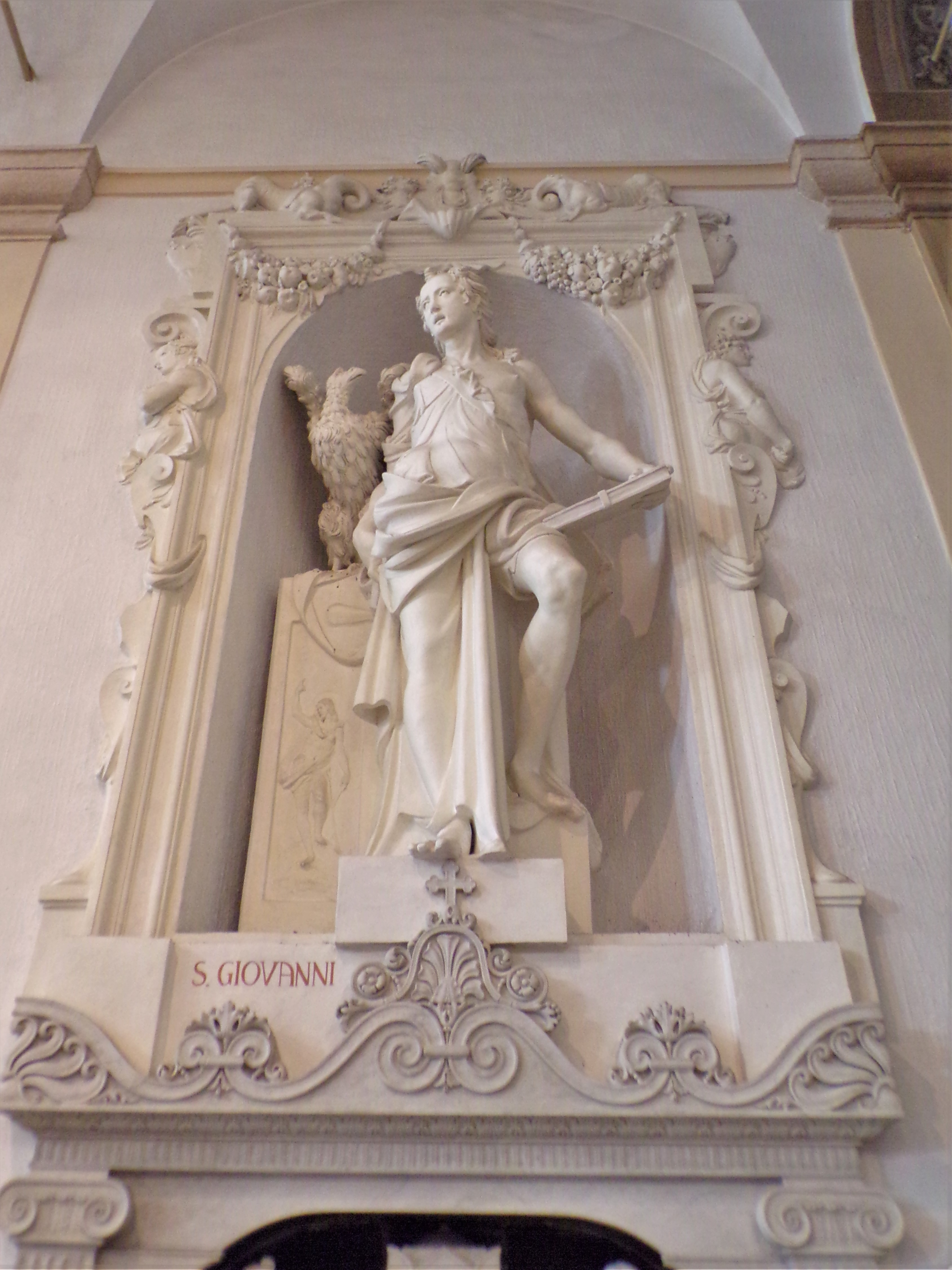
Statue of John the Evangelist.

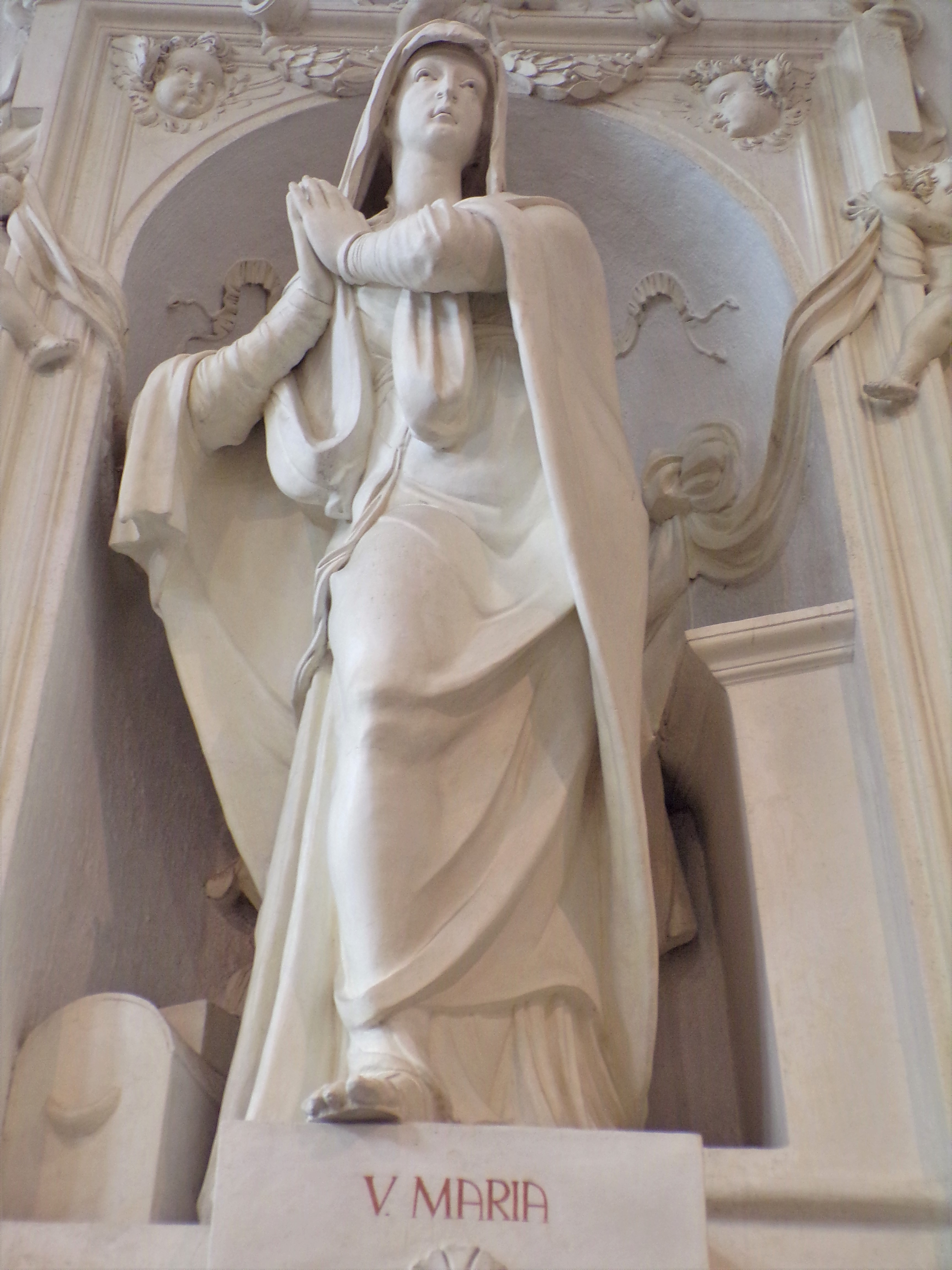
Statue of the Virgin Mary.

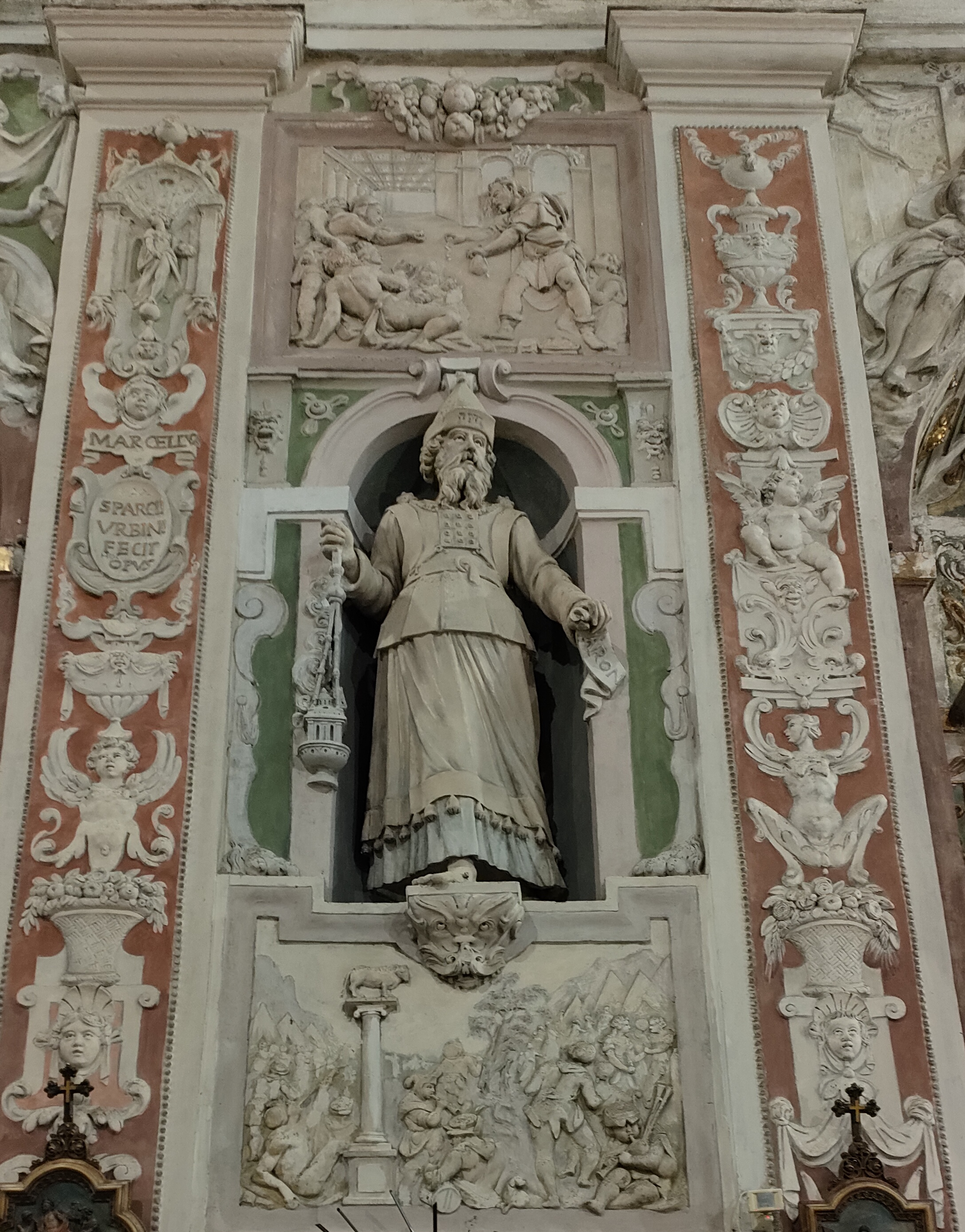
The interiors of the Church of San Rocco di Granarolo.

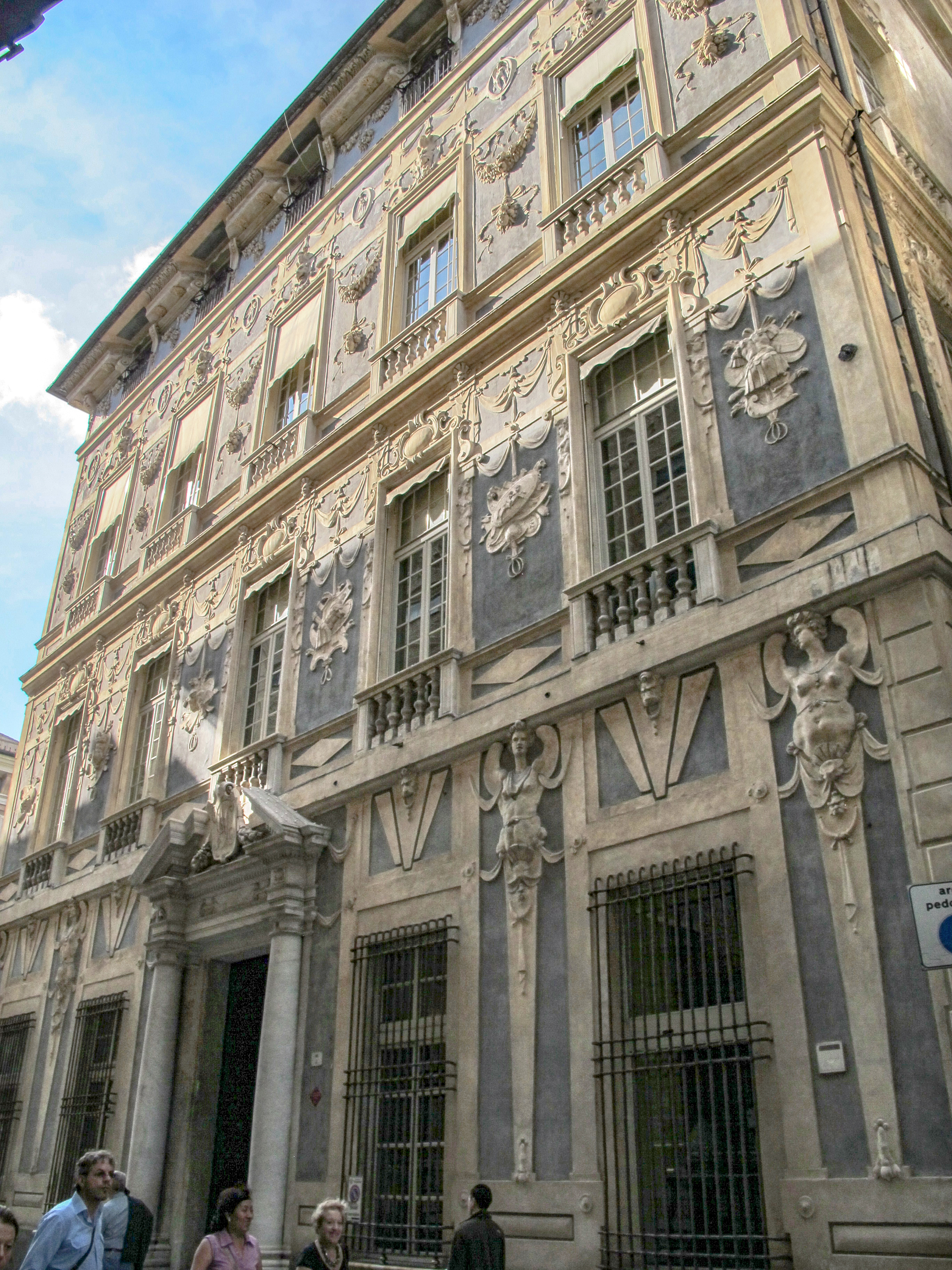
Facade of Palazzo Lomellino.

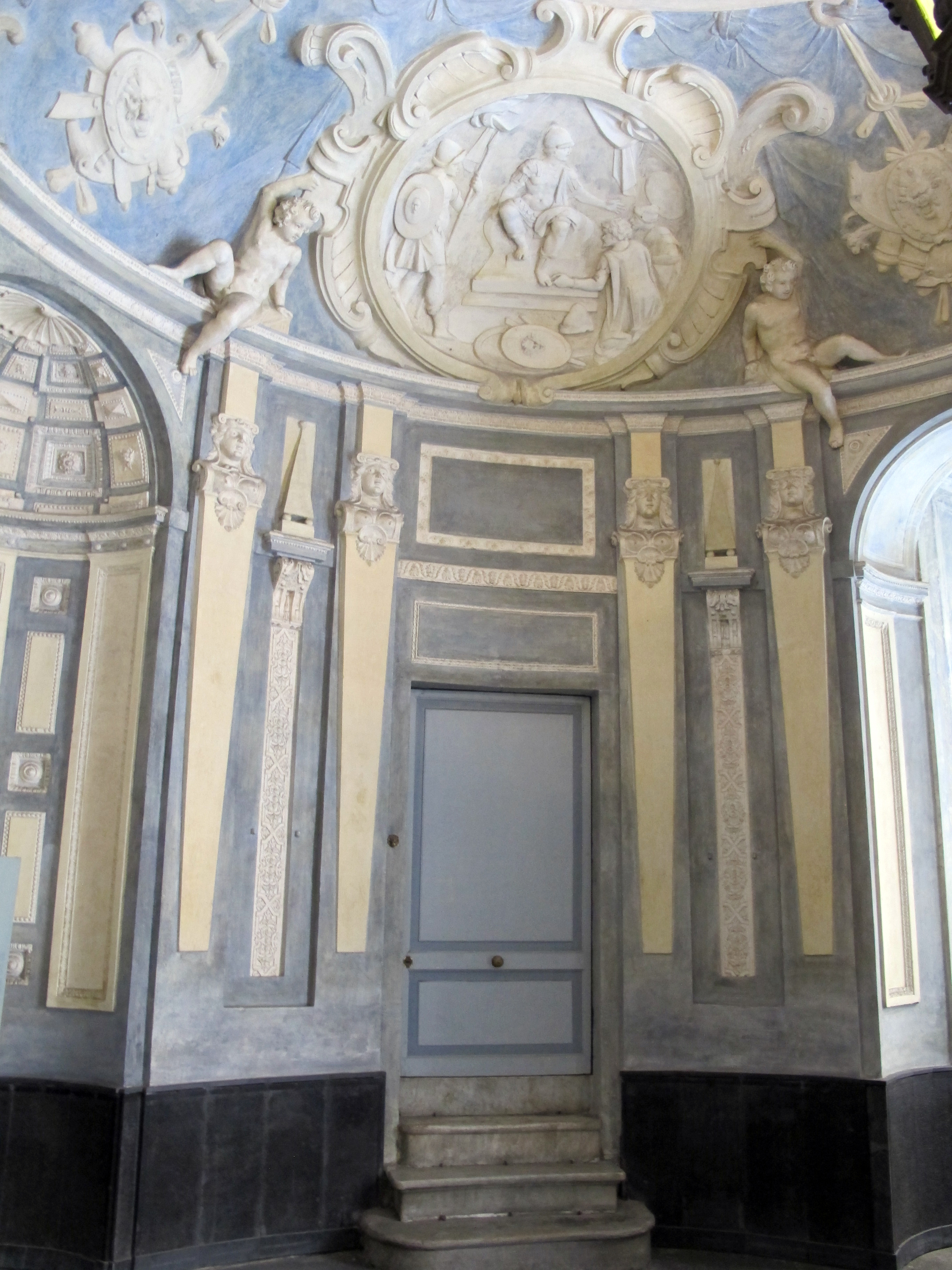
Stucco decorations in the entrance hall of Palazzo Lomellino

== See Also ==
- Jupiter (Marcello Sparzo)

== Bibliography ==
- Soprani, Raffaele (1674). Bottaro, G.; Tiboldi, G.B. (eds.). Le vite de pittori, scoltori, et architetti genovesi. p. 298.
- Alizeri, Federigo (1880). Notizie dei professori del disegno in Liguria dalle origini al secolo XVI. Tipografia Luigi Sambolino.
- Colucci, Giuseppe (1797). Lazzari, Andrea (ed.). Delle Antichità Picene. Vol. XXXI. Fermo. pp. 48–49.
- Raffaele Soprani (1768). Carlo Giuseppe Ratti (ed.). Vite de' pittori, scultori, ed architetti genovesi. Stamperia Casamara. p. 433.
- Franco Boggero (1999). "Marcello Sparzo plasticatore per Giovanni Andrea Doria". In Luisa Stagno; Maria Clelia Galassi (eds.). Giovanni Andrea Doria e Loano. La chiesa di S. Agostino. Comune di Loano.
- Puncuh, Dino (1963). "Storia della cultura ligure". Atti della Società ligure di Storia Patria, Vol XLV Fasc. II (PDF).
- Sanguineti, Daniele (2015). "Plastica e intaglio nella cappella Doria: il ciclo di Marcello Sparzo e altre testimonianze". In Zenelli, Gianluca (ed.). Restauri nella chiesa di Nostra Signora delle Grazie. Sagep. pp. 16–27.
- Pesenti, Franco Renzo (2000). "Marcello Sparzo nel Seicento tra Genova e Urbino". Trasparenze (10/2000). Genova: Edizioni San Marco dei Giustiniani.
- Hanke, Stephanie (2012). "Die Macht der Giganten: Zu einem verlorenen Jupiter des Marcello Sparzo und der Genueser Kolossalplastik des 16. Jahrhunderts". Römisches Jahrbuch der Bibliotheca Hertziana (in German). Hirmer Verlag. pp. 165–186.
- Casati, Alessandra (2012). "«La detta capella par un homo stropiato». Le complesse vicende della cappella del Rosario nella chiesa di San Tommaso a Pavia". L'immagine del rigore. Committenza artistica di e per Pio V a Roma e in Lombardia. Pavia: Collegio Ghislieri. pp. 167–221. ISBN 9788871644189.

Media related to Marcello Sparzo at Wikimedia Commons
