= Andrea Lazzari =

Andrea Lazzari may refer to:

- Andrea Lazzari (historian) (1754–1831), an Italian historian,
- Andrea Lazzari (footballer) (born 1984), an Italian football midfielder.
