= Giuseppe Colucci =

Giuseppe Colucci may refer to:

- Giuseppe Colucci (historian) (1752–1809), Italian historian
- Giuseppe Colucci (footballer) (born 1980), Italian football midfielder
