= Palazzo Tommaso Spinola =

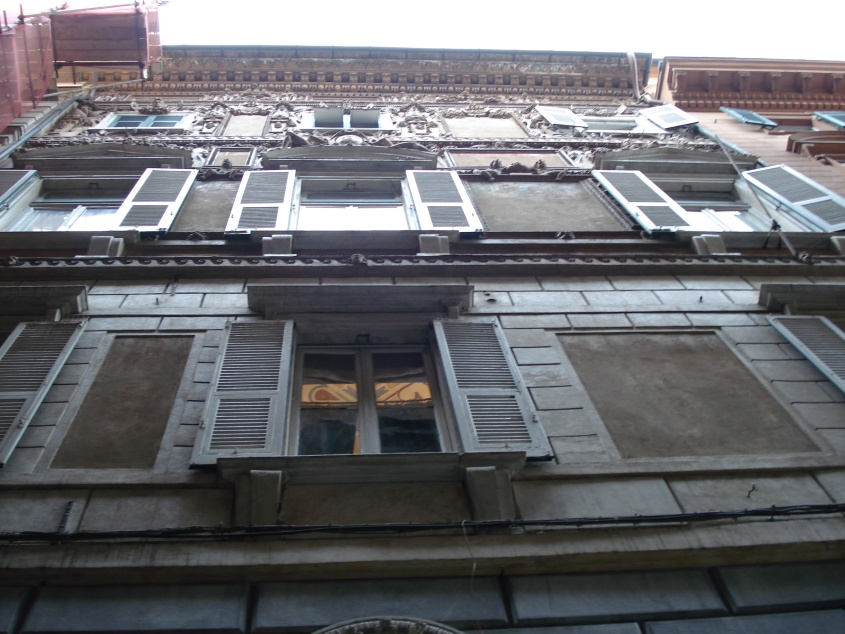
- Facade of the Palazzo Tommaso Spinola in via Salita di Santa Caterina 3
- Interactive map of the Palazzo Tommaso Spinola area
- Alternative names: Palazzo Tomaso Spinola di Luccoli, Palazzo Spinola Pessagno

General information
- Status: In use
- Type: Palace
- Architectural style: Mannerist
- Location: Genoa, Italy, 3 Salita di Santa Caterina
- Coordinates: 44.410183°N 8.936003°E
- Current tenants: residential building
- Construction started: 1558
- Completed: 1561

Design and construction
- Architect: Giovan Battista Castello

UNESCO World Heritage Site
- Part of: Genoa: Le Strade Nuove and the system of the Palazzi dei Rolli
- Criteria: Cultural: (ii)(iv)
- Reference: 1211
- Inscription: 2006 (30th Session)

The Palazzo Tommaso Spinola, also known as Palazzo Tomaso Spinola di Luccoli or Palazzo Spinola Pessagno, is a building located in salita di Santa Caterina at number 3 in Genoa, included on 13 July 2006 in the list of the 42 palaces inscribed in the Rolli di Genova that became World Heritage by UNESCO on that date.

== History ==
Situated between the old Spinola di Luccoli square and the Della Rovere square, it was built to a design by the author of the most unpublished palaces of Mannerism in Genoa, Giovan Battista Castello, known as the Bergamasco, between 1558 and 1561 for Tommaso Spinola, who kept the palace for only a few years, selling it in 1574 to Luca Negrone.

It was included in the third compass of the Rollo 1664.

Counted in the 18th century among the properties of the Pessagno family, who still owned it at the end of the 19th century, the palace is now used as a private residence.

== Description ==
=== Exterior ===
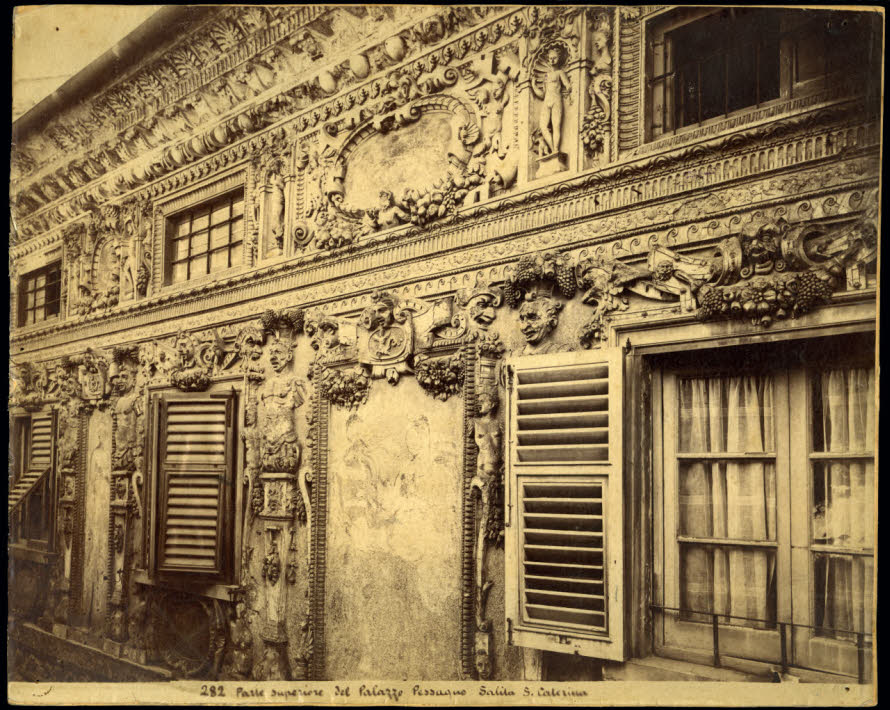
Upper part of the palace, in a photo, prior to 1892, of the decorations attributed to Andrea de' Carona, 16th century.

Bergamasco's «mark», of full Mannerist observance, can be read in the very fine and original design of the portal richly elaborated with female herms set in a decoration of various architectural motifs, supporting a broken tympanum with spiral volutes, executed in white marble by sculptors Giacomo Ponzello and Pompeo Bianchi (1560). However, what is most striking about Bergamasco's decorative work is the relief decoration of the façade, with its fanciful fresco and stucco quadrature, similar to that executed in the same years by Bergamasco in the palazzo Gio. Vincenzo Imperiale in Campetto — built between 1555 and 1560 — and in palazzo Nicolosio Lomellini in Strada Nuova (1558).

In contrast to the difficulty of observing it, the decoration of the upper floors of the building shows itself to be extraordinarily elaborate and exceptionally complex, in a superimposition of fantastic beings, monstrous masks, herms in the shape of armour and planetary deities, figures combining clawed legs, fish tails, bird's wings and female faces, with obvious magical and alchemical references extracted from Hermeticism (philosophy).

=== Interior ===
The atrium (architecture) is accessible while from the triforium, enclosed with glass windows, only part of the staircase can be seen.

The interior is richly frescoed from the atrium to the second floor parlours (Hero in Parnassus by Luca Cambiaso and a similar subject uncertainly attributed to Andrea Semino); in the atrium in particular is a fresco with Andromeda naked exposed to the monster and, in the vault above the entrance to the staircase, Andromeda welcoming Perseus liberator.

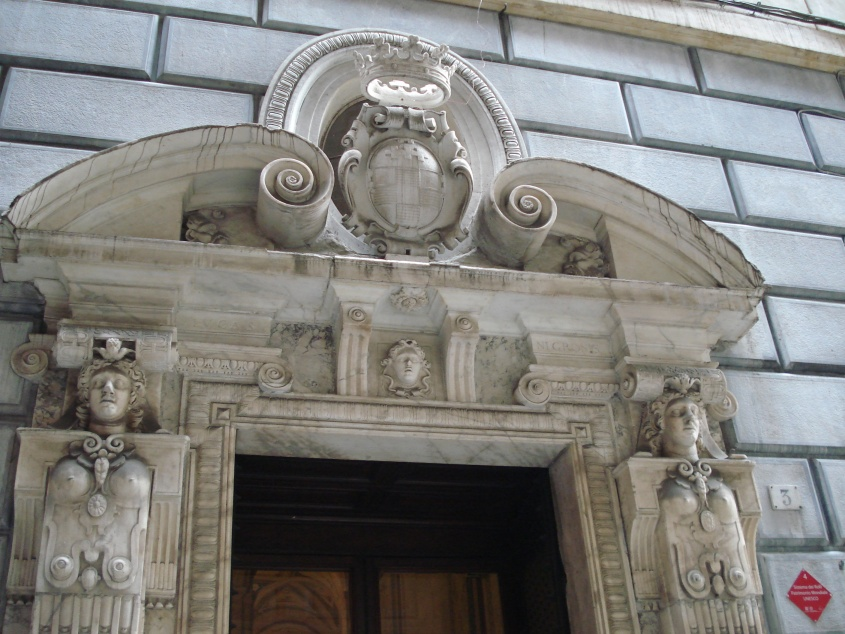
The portal

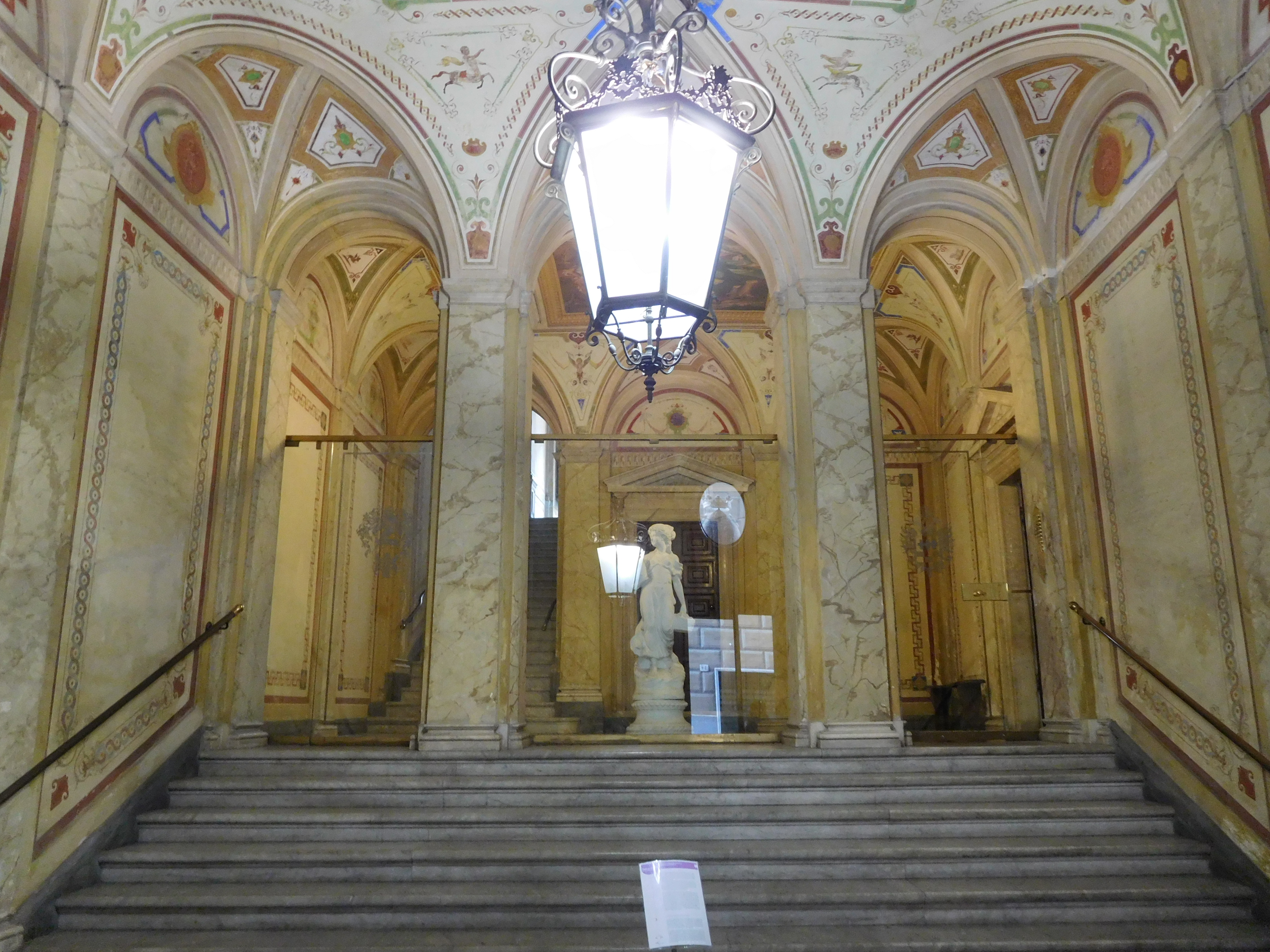
Atrium

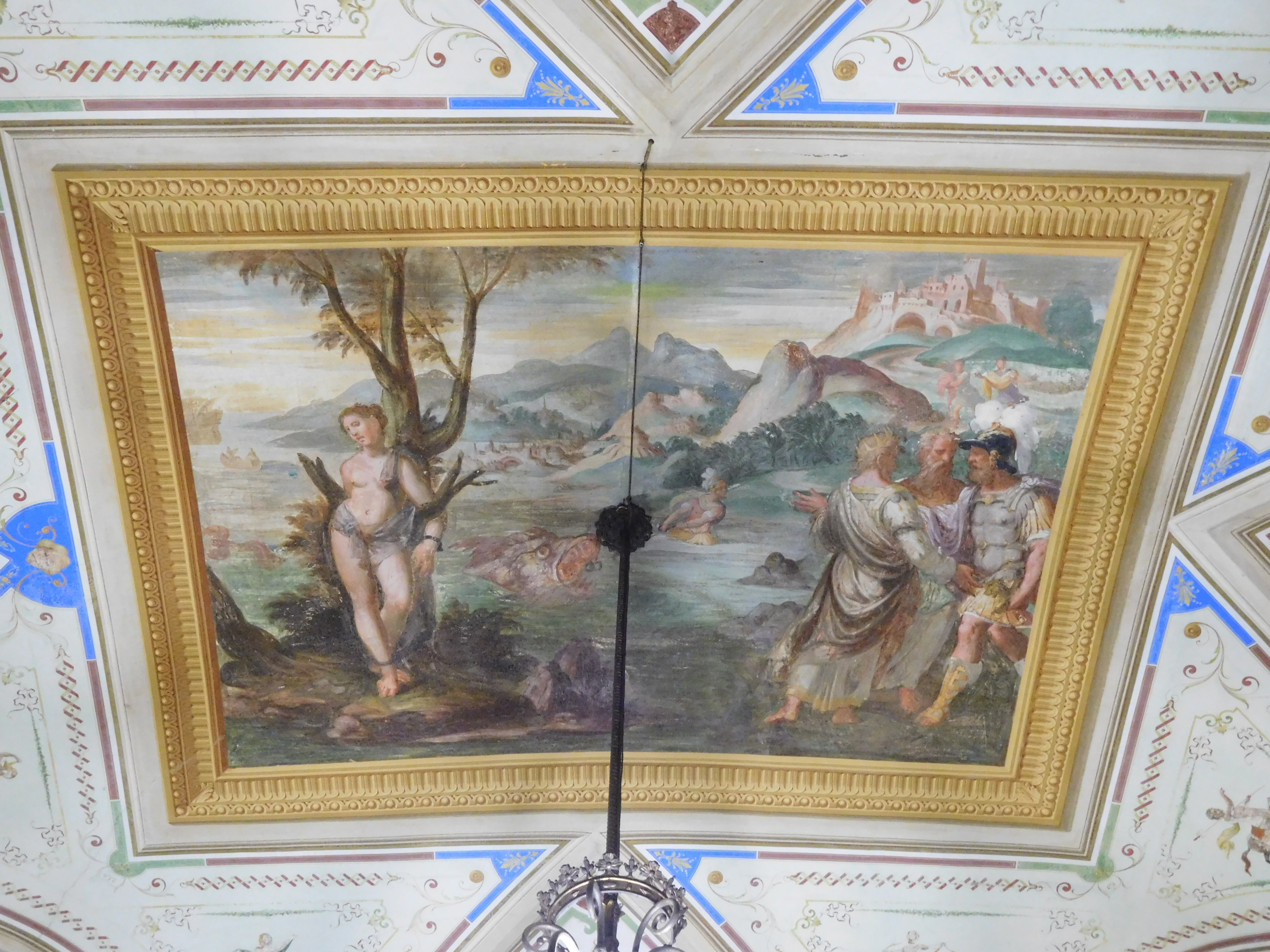
Perseus and Andromeda

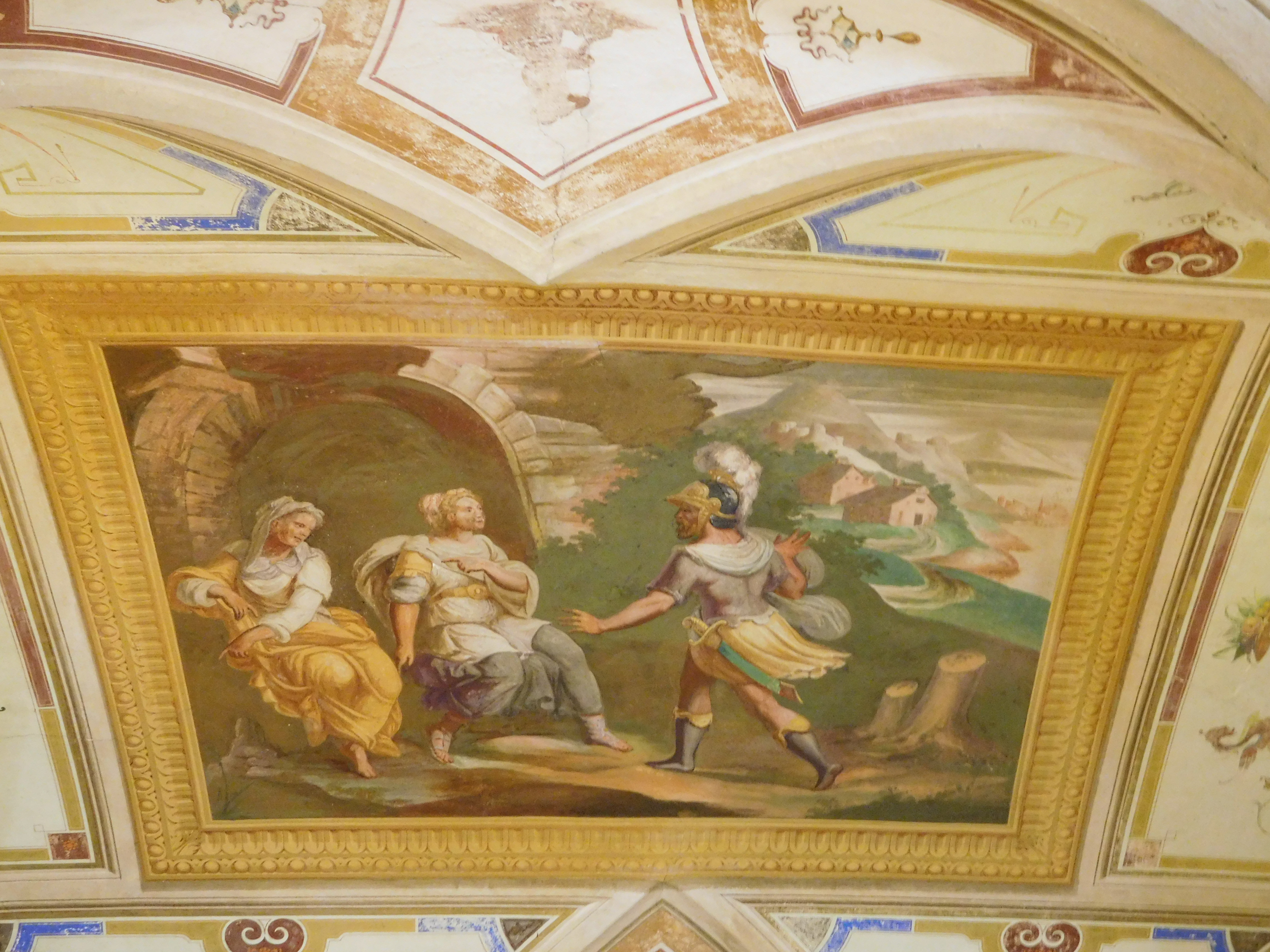

== Sources ==
=== Italian sources ===
- R. Erbentraut, Die Spinola-Fresken des Palazzo Pessagno Pallavicino und die Schlacht von Mühlberg, “Zeitschrift fur Kunstgeschichte”, 4.1990, pp. 537–559.
- C. Pastor C., R. Ricci, S. Boj, G. Causa, Gli stucchi di palazzo Spinola-Pessagno a Genova. Un caso peculiare del rapporto fra stucco e ambiente. Analisi dei componenti e dei processi di trasformazione, in Lo Stucco. Cultura, Tecnologia, Conoscenza, Atti del Convegno di Studi Bressanone 10–13 luglio 2001, a cura di G. Biscontin, G. Driussi, pp. 483–493.
- E. Poleggi, Genova una civiltà di palazzi, Cinisello Balsamo (Milano) 2002, pp. 72–73 (Palazzo di Tommaso Spinola di Luccoli (1558–1561)).
- I. Croce (a cura di), La misura della bellezza. I 42 Palazzi dei Rolli, Genova 2009, pp. 17–18.

== Bibliography ==
=== Italian sources ===
- A. M. Parodi (a cura di), "Guida ai palazzi dei Rolli di Genova", Genova, Carige, 2007
- Parma. E (a cura di), "La pittura in Liguria. Il Cinquecento", Genova, Carige, 1999
- Alizeri Federico, (Attribuito a) Manuale del forestiere per la città di Genova, Genova, 1846 pag. 364
- Alizeri Federico, Guida illustrativa del cittadino e del forastiero per la città di Genova e sue adiacenze, Bologna, Forni Editore, 1972 pag. 231
- Poleggi Ennio e Poleggi Fiorella (Presentazione, ricerca iconografica e note a cura di), Descrizione della città di Genova da un anonimo del 1818, Genova, Sagep, 1969 pag. 215
- Ratti Carlo Giuseppe, Istruzione di quanto può vedersi di più bello in Genova in pittura scultura et architettura autore Carlo Giuseppe Ratti pittor genovese, Genova, Ivone Gravier, 1780, pag. 292–293
