= Antonio Viviani =

Italian painter

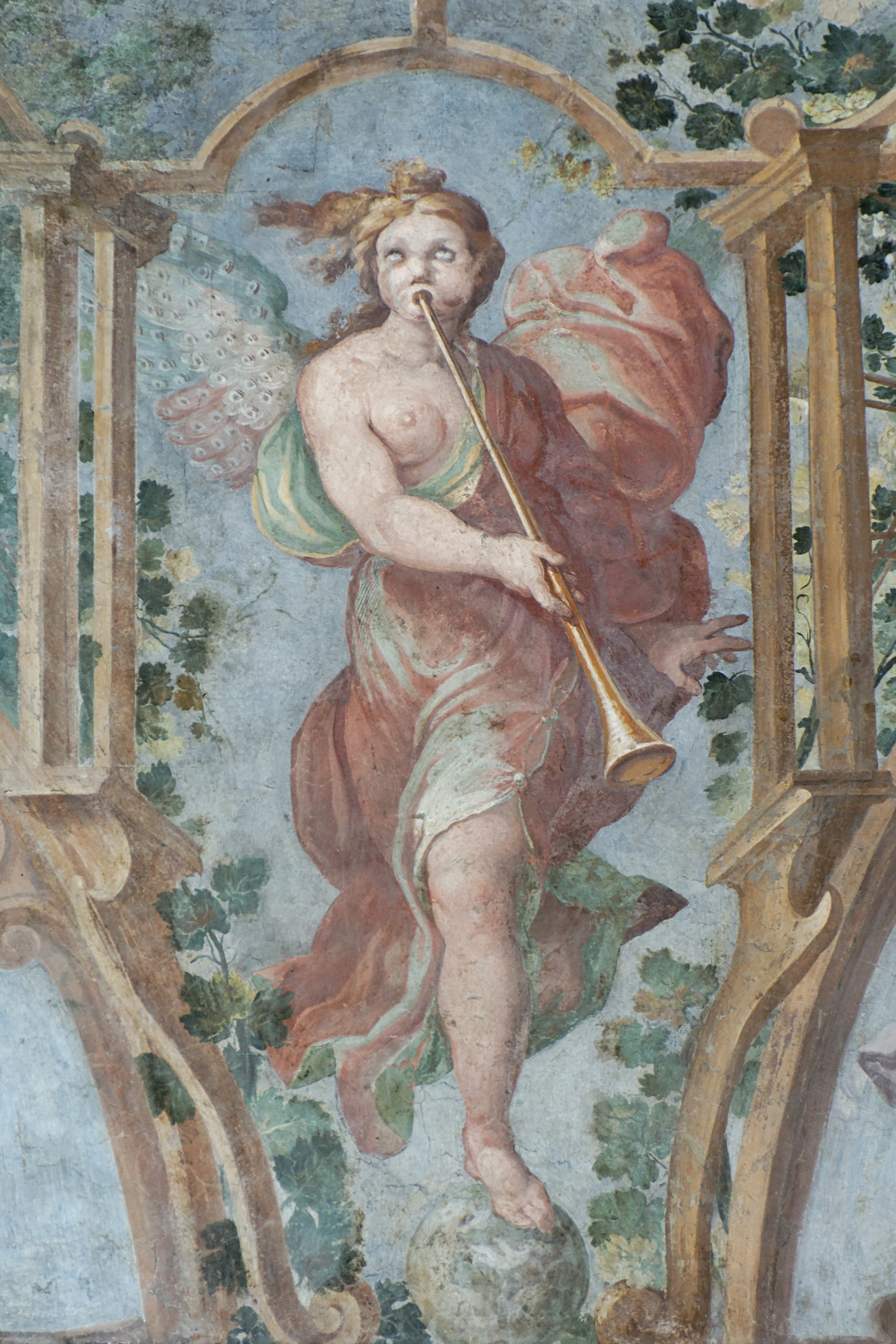
Loggia of Palazzo Altemps, Rome

Antonio Viviani (1560–1620) was an Italian painter of the late Renaissance and early Baroque.

He was also called il Sordo di Urbino ("the Deaf of Urbino"), because of his self-absorption while painting frescoes. He was born in Urbino, and there became a follower of Federigo Barocci, said to have been his uncle. He left some pictures at Urbino, in the style of Barocci, various frescoes in Rome, and a vast work in the Chiesa de' Filippini (San Pietro in Valle) at Fano (1618–1620), consisting of scenes from the lives of those apostles to whom the church was dedicated. These works are now in the Pinacoteca Civica of Fano. He also painted for the Oratory of the Santissima Annunziata in Urbino. In Rome, he is said to have gravitated to the syle of Cesare D'Arpino.

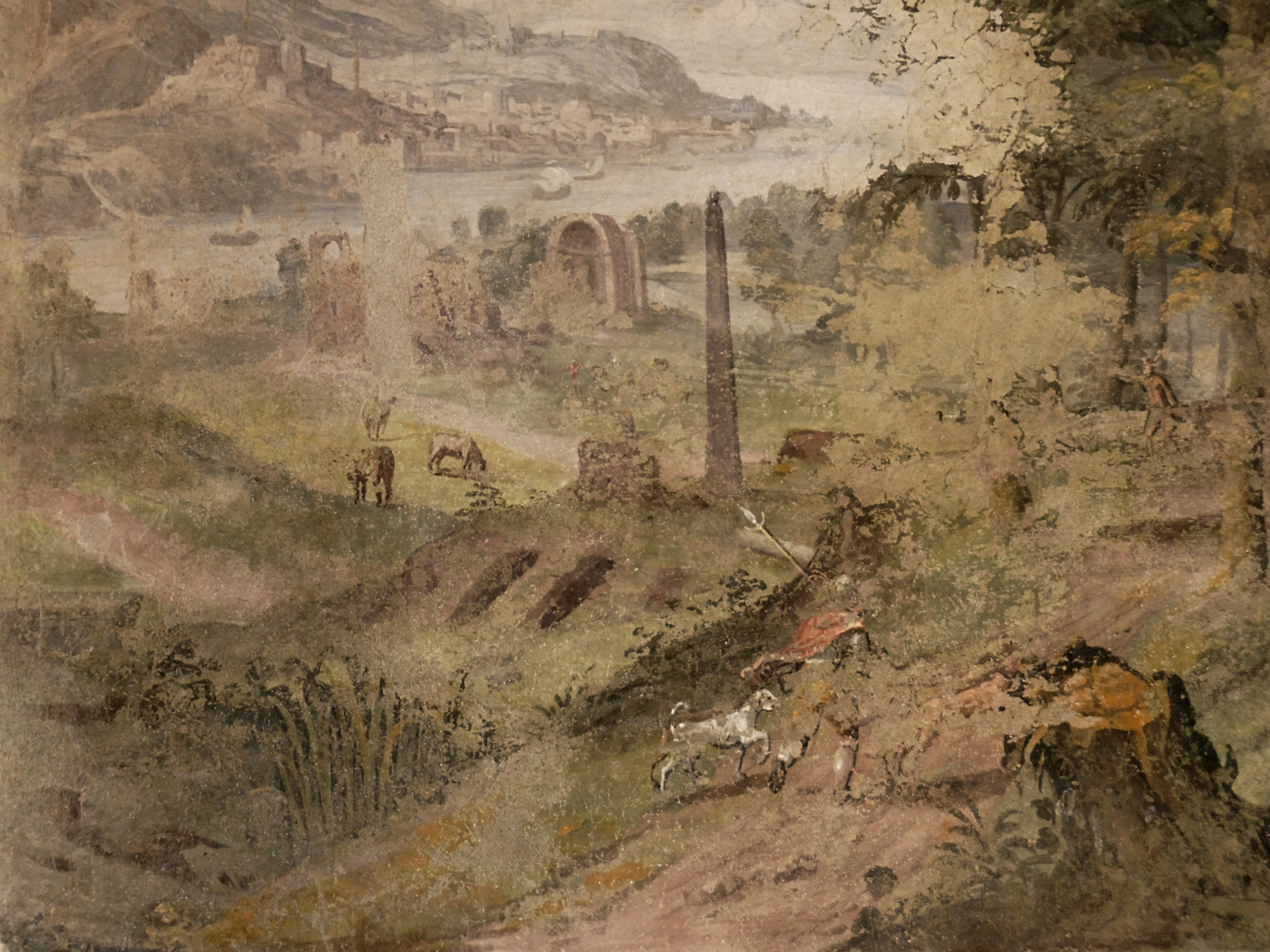
Man, Dog, Landscape by Antonio Viviani, fresco on loggia of Palazzo Altemps, Rome

After 1585, he traveled to Rome, where he helped fresco the Vatican library and the Scala Santa (1585–1590). He also helped fresco for the loggia of the Palazzo Altemps and for the Palazzo Barberini; the latter works were lost to fire and repainting in the 18th century by Lorenzo Pecheux. From 1596 to 1598, he lived in Genoa. In Urbino, he painted for the Chapels of the Immaculate Conception and Holy Sacrament in Urbino Cathedral.

== Works ==
Other works included:

- Rome:
  - San Giuseppe dei Falegnami
  - Santa Barbara al Celio Oratory
  - Santa Maria dei Monti
- Pergola:
  - San Francesco (St. Francis)
- Cantiano:
  - Collegiata San Giovanni Battista church
  - Sant'Agostino
- Fano:
  - San Pietro in Valle
  - Public Gallery
- Castelleone di Suasa
  - Annunciation, SS. Pietro e Paolo parish church
