= Giuseppe Colucci (historian) =

Italian historian

Giuseppe Colucci (born Penna San Giovanni, 19 March 1752 - died Fermo, 16 March 1809) was an Italian historian and antiquarian, specializing in the antiquities of central Italy. His works include Antichità Picene in 32 volumes, and Antichità Ascolane.

== Life and career ==
Giuseppe Colucci was born in Penna San Giovanni in 1752, the son of Nicolantonio Colucci and Palma Martini. Giuseppe began his studies in his birthplace and continued them in Fermo with the Jesuits from 1768. In 1775, he became a priest, and in 1781 earned a degree in civil and canon law.

Passionate about history and archaeology, he extensively engaged in on-site research, for which he received praise and established connections within the curia and the Italian cultural academic world. As was customary for scholars of his time, he was admitted to various academies, including the Accademia degli Erranti, the Accademia Georgica, the Accademia Clementina of Bologna, and the Pontifical Academy of Arcadia (under the pseudonym Lacinio Telamonio).

He was a significant historian and scholar of the antiquities of central Italy. His most notable works are the Antichità Picene (Antiquities of Marche), a compendium comprising a remarkable 32 volumes, and the Antichità Ascolane (Antiquities of Ascoli). In 1786, Colucci published the first volume of Antichità Picene in Fermo, which would become his most important work. He dedicated the book to pope Pio VI, who was so impressed that he granted to Colucci the access to the libraries and archives of the Piceno region, also stipulating that "each city, town, or castle in the Piceno should acquire a copy of the work". After establishing his own printing press, Colucci produced another thirty volumes on the subject over the course of a decade. This work, while occasionally criticized for its organization and sometimes regionalistic style, became essential for the study of Picene history, described by the Treccani Encyclopedia as "a precious and irreplaceable source".

Due to the military events that involved the Italian territory at the end of the 18th century, Colucci suspended his publications in 1797, although he continued to collect essays and material (including works by Lazzari and others). Having become the vicar general in Orvieto in 1800, he was unable to return to publishing the additional material due to his intensive activities. He died in Fermo on March 16, 1809.

== Sources ==
- Verducci, Carlo (1982). "COLUCCI, Giuseppe". Dizionario Biografico degli Italiani, Volume 27: Collenuccio–Confortini (in Italian). Rome: Istituto dell'Enciclopedia Italiana. ISBN 978-8-81200032-6.
- San Ginesio.org, Personaggi illustri
