= San Pietro in Banchi, Genoa =

Church building in Genoa, Italy

Church of Saint Peter in Banchi (Chiesa di San Pietro in Banchi)
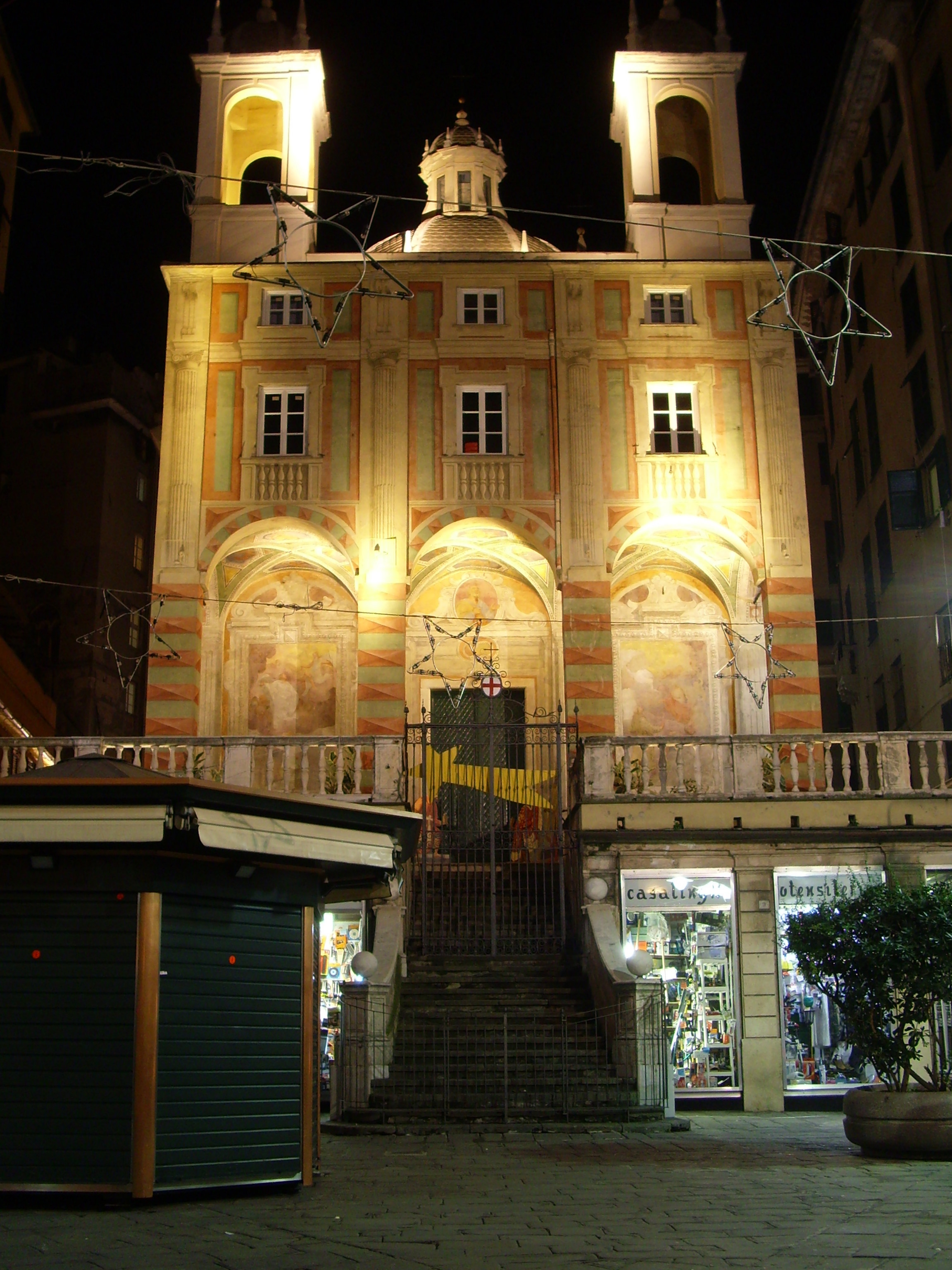
- The façade of the church.

Religion
- Affiliation: Roman Catholic
- Province: Genoa

Location
- Location: Genoa, Italy
- Interactive map of Church of Saint Peter in Banchi (Chiesa di San Pietro in Banchi)
- Coordinates: 44.409108°N 8.929828°E

Architecture
- Type: Church
- Groundbreaking: 1572
- Completed: 1585

Church of Saint Peter in Banchi (Italian: Chiesa di San Pietro in Banchi) is a Roman Catholic church in the city of Genoa, in the Province of Genoa and the region of Liguria, Italy. It was designed by Taddeo Carlone in 1579, and the construction was carried out by Daniello Casella, a pupil of his.
