= Andrea Lazzari (historian) =

Italian historian and clergyman (1754–1831)

- Born: 16 August 1754; Urbino
- Died: 6 December 1831 (aged 77); Rome
- Occupations: Historian, Writer, Clergyman

Andrea Lazzari (16 August 1754 – 6 December 1831) was an Italian historian and clergyman, known for his significant contributions to the history of Urbino.

== Biography ==
Born in Urbino to Antonio Lazzari, a citizen of Urbino, and Angella Mattei, daughter of Flavia Speranza, a noble from Fossombrone, Lazzari pursued studies in theology at the Order of Poor Clerics Regular of the Mother of God of the Pious Schools in Urbino. He later obtained degrees in civil and canon law under the guidance of Prevost Venturucci.

Due to his expertise in literature, he was appointed as a professor of eloquence at the seminary in Jesi and later in Pesaro, where he also served as the rector. After the death of Monsignor Barsanti, he returned to Urbino and became the archpriest of the parish of San Martino in 1785 and the provost of the church of Santo Spirito in 1794, where he worked from 1795 to 1816. He was a member of prestigious academies, including the Pontifical Academy of Arcadia, the Ducale, and the Pontifical Ecclesiastical Academy. Lazzari also became a "college doctor" of the University of Urbino. Under Pope Pius VI, he received numerous accolades in his ecclesiastical career, serving as a deputy in Rome for the Community of Urbino and Montefeltro in 1797 (an administrative entity in the historical region of Marche, during the pre-unification period). He was appointed as a protonotary apostolic, secret chamberlain, and, in 1805, Prelate of Honour of His Holiness the Pontiff.

Lazzari's most significant contributions were as an historian with his rigorous research on the history of Urbino. His works, characterized by erudition and critical analysis, were highly regarded by scholars of his time. Some of his writings were included in the most important work by Giuseppe Colucci, a thirty-volume series on "Picene antiquities". He was also a major source for Gaetano Moroni in the compilation of his work "Dizionario di erudizione storico-ecclesiastica" (Dictionary of Historical-Ecclesiastical Erudition). Colucci, in the introduction to the third volume, praised Lazzari's erudition and critical acumen, highlighting two dissertations Lazzari wrote on Urbino's origin and its religion. These dissertations were originally published and subsequently included in Colucci's work.

Andrea Lazzari died on the night of 5–6 December 1831, at the age of 77. A street in the city of Nociglia was named after him.

== Works ==
- "Precetti della rettorica" (1782)
- "Lettere inedite, ed elogj del Sig. Dott. Lod. Antonio Muratori Proposto della Pomposa" (1783)
- "Dell'epigrafia, o sia dell'arte di comporre le iscrizioni" (1784)
- "Del modo di distinguere le false iscrizioni dalle vere" (1784)
- "Principj pratici dell'arte Oratoria sacra, e profana. Trattato diviso in XII lezioni" (1786)
- "Ricerche di S. Crescentino Martire Protettore della Città d'Urbino" (1787)
- "Della Origine della città di Urbino" (1788)
- "Su di varie memorie istoriche e antichità e sulla decadenza di Urbino" (1788)
- "Dei due urbini Metaurense e Ortense"
- "Serie de' vescovi ed arcivescovi d'Urbino"
- "Disamina della patria di Bramante" (1791)
- "Progetti letterari dl Sig. Dottor Lodovico Antonio Muratori proposti ed approvati in varie lettere"
- "Memorie istoriche dei conti, e duchi di Urbino" (1795)
- "Dizionario storico degl'illustri professori delle belle arti, e de' valenti mecanici d'Urbino" (1796)
- "Memorie d'alcuni più celebri pittori di Urbino" (1800)
- "Delle chiese di Urbino e delle pitture in esse esistenti" (1801)

== Bibliography ==
- Tommaso Moro (1796). Biblioteca Picena, Notizie istoriche delle opere e degli scrittori piceni. Vol. 5. Domenicantonio Quercetti. pp. 245–249.
- Biblioteca enciclopedica italiana, Scrittori di belle arti. Vol. 14. Milano: Nicolò Bettoni. 1831. p. 578.
