= Palazzo Nicolosio Lomellino =

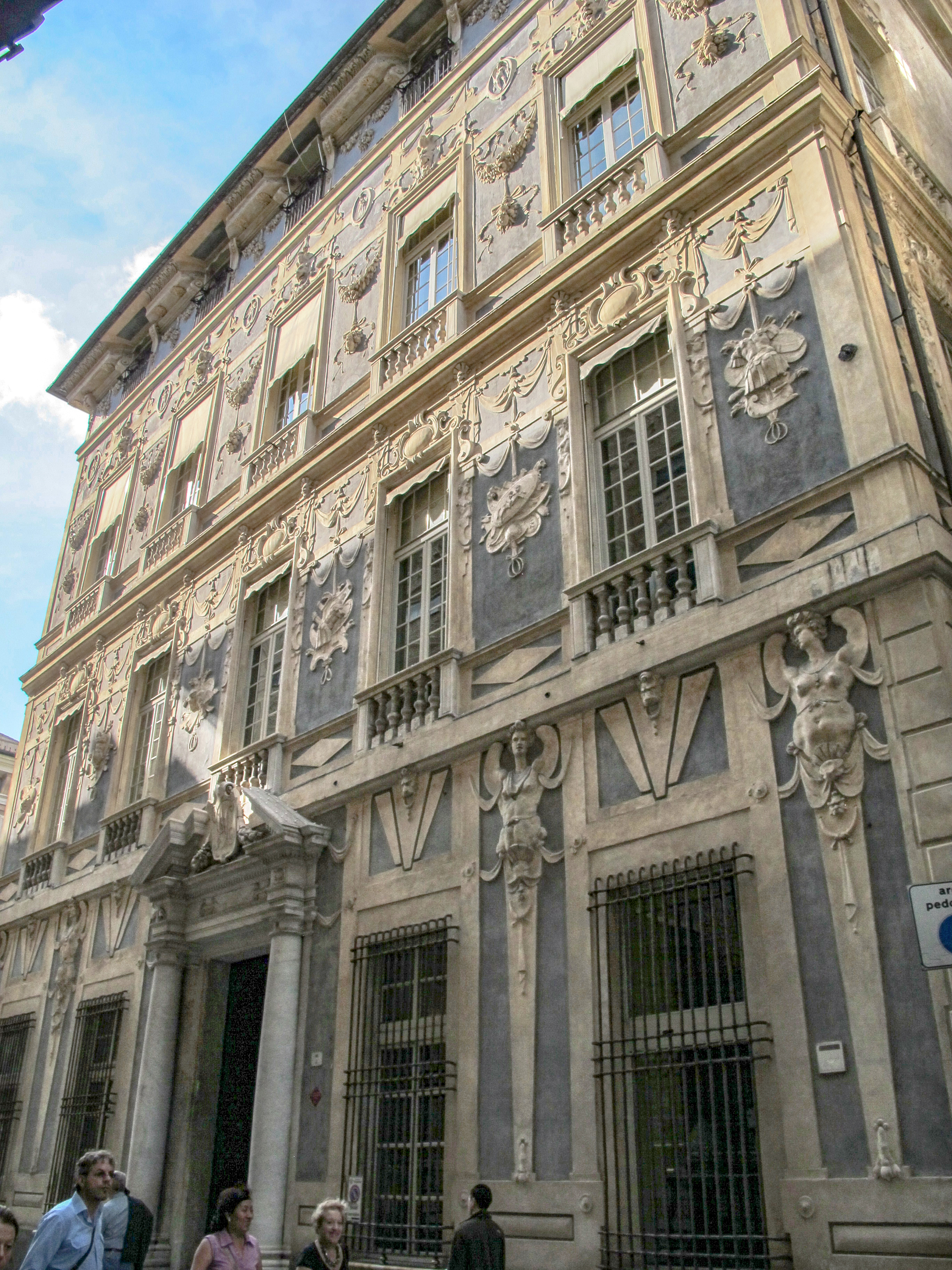
- Facade of the Palazzo Nicolosio Lomellino in via Garibaldi 7
- Interactive map of the Palazzo Nicolosio Lomellino area
- Alternative names: Palazzo Podesta

General information
- Status: Intact
- Type: Palace
- Architectural style: Mannerist
- Location: Genoa, Italy, 7 Via Garibaldi
- Coordinates: 44.411039°N 8.933281°E
- Construction started: 1559
- Completed: 1565

Design and construction
- Architects: Giovan Battista Castello and Bernardo Cantone

UNESCO World Heritage Site
- Part of: Genoa: Le Strade Nuove and the system of the Palazzi dei Rolli
- Criteria: Cultural: (ii)(iv)
- Reference: 1211
- Inscription: 2006 (30th Session)

The Palazzo Podestà or Palazzo Nicolosio Lomellino is a building located in via Garibaldi at number 7 in the historical centre of Genoa, included on 13 July 2006 in the list of the 42 palaces inscribed in the Rolli di Genova that became World Heritage by UNESCO on that date.

== History and description ==
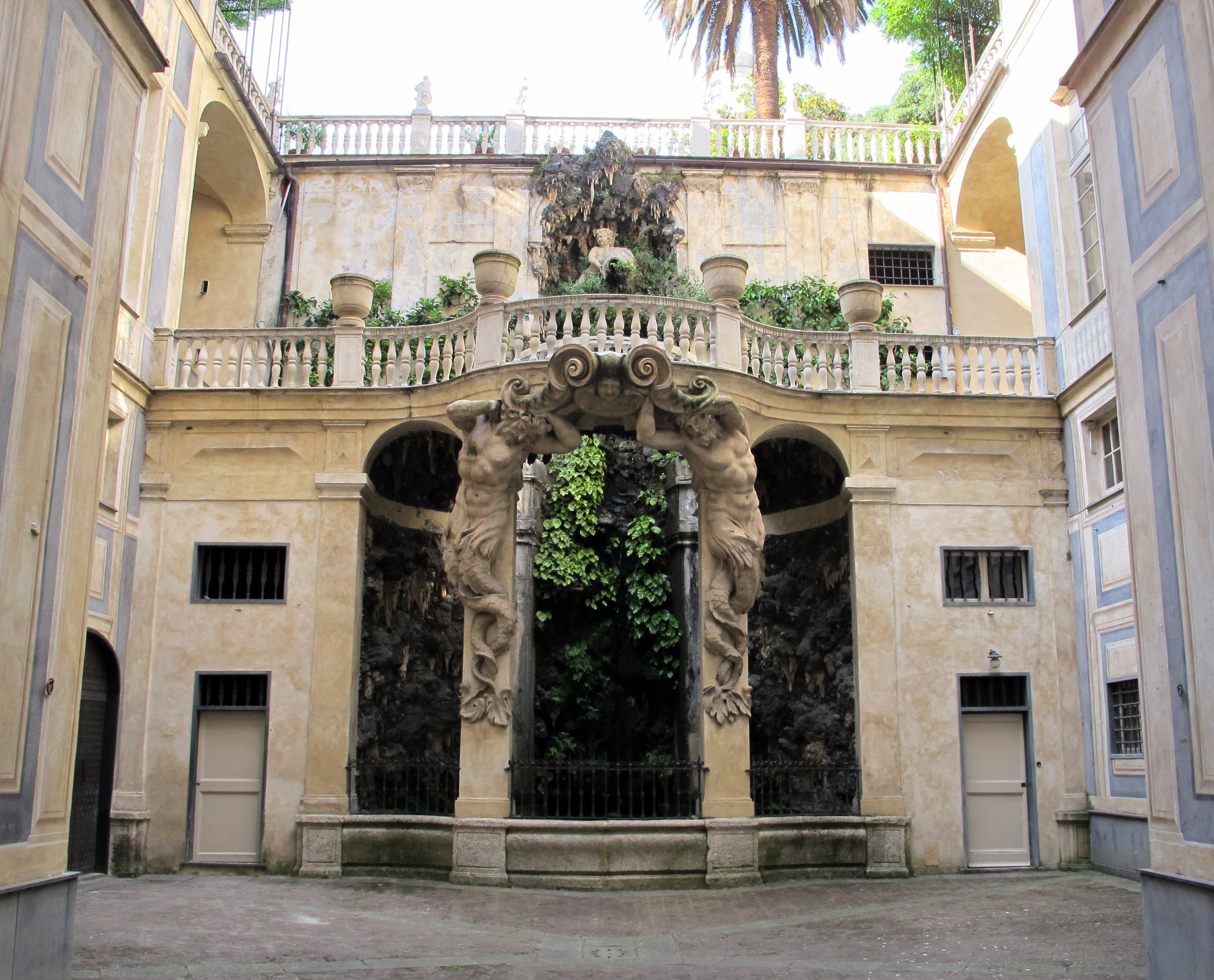
Domenico Parodi, The Nymphaeum in the Courtyard

It was built between 1559 and 1565 by Giovan Battista Castello known as the "Bergamasco" and Bernardino Cantone at the behest of Nicolosio Lomellino, an exponent of a Lomellini (family) in full economic and political ascendancy. Related to the prince Andrea Doria, he accumulated considerable capital in the first half of the 16th century as a concessionaire of the lucrative coral fishery on the Tunisian island of Tabarca. At the beginning of the 17th century the property passed to the Centurione (family) who carried out an internal renovation, then to the Pallavicini, the Raggi and finally to Andrea Podestà, several times mayor of Genoa between 1866 and 1895.

The façade, designed by Bergamasco, is enlivened by a rich decoration in stucco, with winged female herms, supporting the string-course cornice on the ground floor; ribbons and drapes supporting trophies of arms on the first floor; garlands and masks crowning the windows, with classical figures in oval medallions on the second. The antique stucco decoration, applied for the first time in modern times by Raffaello in the Logge vaticane and precociously imported to Genoa by his pupil Perin del Vaga in the decoration of the Villa del Principe, is deployed here for the first time on a large scale covering the entire elevation. Its execution is attributed to Marcello Sparzo.

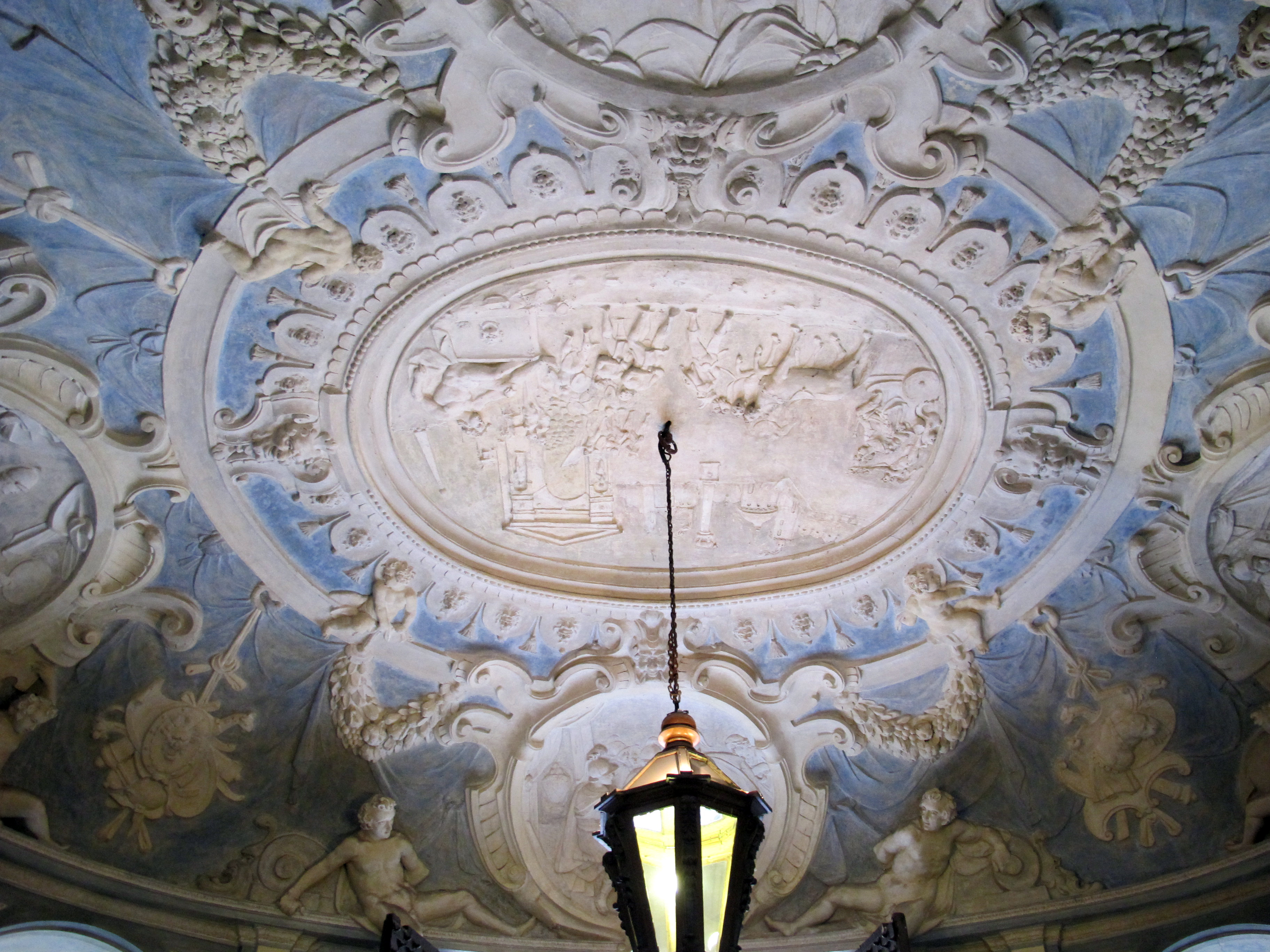
Stuccoes in the hall

Also evident in the festive stucco decoration of the oval atrium is the design intervention of Bergamasco, who was able to introduce the suggestions of the most up-to-date Mannerist culture to Genoa. The decoration unfolds from the central oval medallion with a Scene of triumph of a condottiere surrounded by masks connected to four putti seated on the frame itself, holding a head of fruit festoons, hooked in turn to the frames of the four bas-relief stories, alternating with other ephebic figures seated on the cornice. Despite the complexity of the design, the whole is light and harmonious to the spectator who is introduced to the large courtyard.

The open courtyard is bordered on the sides by the rear wings of the palazzo, while the terraces overlook a grandiose nymphaeum built in the 18th century to a design by Domenico Parodi. The nymphaeum, which harmoniously blends architectural, natural and sculptural elements, is heir to a particularly flourishing tradition in Genoa, which already had illustrious examples in the Villa Pallavicino delle Peschiere, in the villa of the Prince, and in the nearby palazzi di Pantaleo Spinola and Balbi Senarega. Here the architect-sculptor Parodi devised a monumental and unprecedented solution, exploiting the copious waters of Castelletto to connect the courtyard with the garden two levels higher up, entrusting the stucco sculptures of the gigantic tritons and the putto throwing water to his pupil Biggi, while the group of Phaeton falling from the sky placed in the centre of the grotto and crumbled over the centuries by the water is lost. A garden opens towards the mountain, erected by exploiting the slope of the hill behind.

== Interior ==
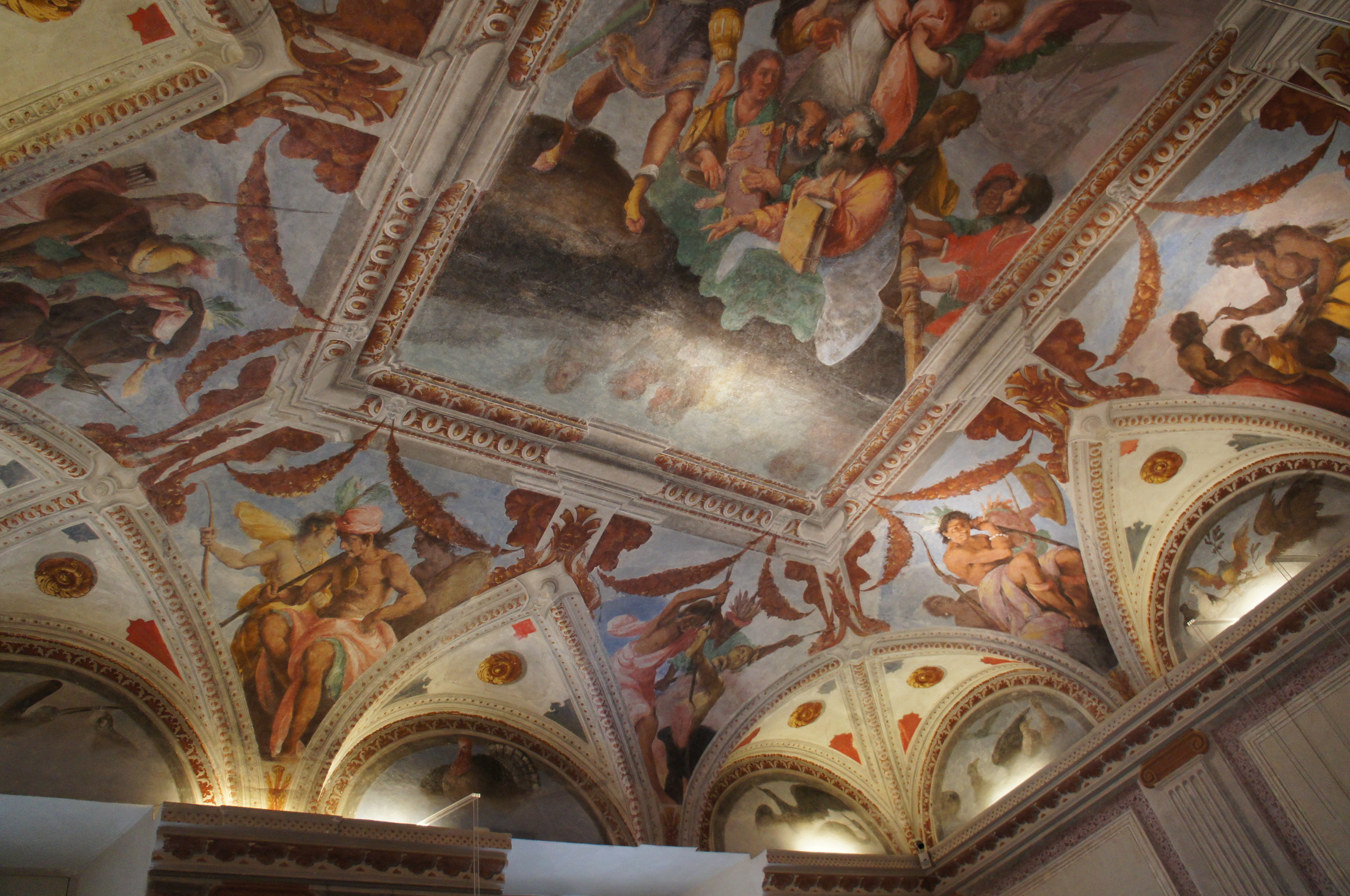
Bernardo Strozzi,The Christian Faith Lands in the New World, Detail of the Central Hall Vault

The oldest pictorial work in the palace is the cycle of frescoes painted in 1623–1624 by the Genoese painter Bernardo Strozzi and later concealed due to a quarrel with the client Luigi Centurione, who had purchased the palace in 1609 from Nicolosio Lomellino. Documents, which still exist today, relating to the dispute between the artist and Centurione (1625), confirm the painter's work in three rooms on the first piano nobile, the frescoes of which were concealed by later interventions with a thick layer of plaster and a false ceiling in the central hall. Removed in 2002, the Allegory of Faith. reappeared underneath it. The fresco shows a rowing lifeboat from which a woman representing the Christian faith is helped to land on dry land to bring the faith to the natives of the New World, depicted in the surrounding lunettes together with exotic animals. Also on board the lifeboat are two sailors and the four evangelists, recognisable as each of them holds a book. The Faith, supported by angels, is instead identified by the chalice and the cross, while the nobleman with the sword, assumed to be Christopher Columbus, who was friendly with the Centurione Scotto family. Columbus' exploits were a frequent subject in the decoration of Genoese palaces, already featured in the central hall of palazzo Belimbau frescoed by Tavarone. In the other two rooms, in a more precarious condition, the Astrology and fragments with Navigation and Tritons were found. This fresco, unfinished, now offers the rare opportunity to observe the squaring and preparatory drawing done with black chalk.

The second piano nobile houses the mythological-themed decoration commissioned in the early 18th century by the Pallavicino family. It consists of masterpieces by the major exponents of the late Genoese Baroque. In two drawing rooms on the piano nobile, the Bolognese Giacomo Antonio Boni frescoed Jupiter and the goat Amaltea and Domenico Parodi Bacchus holds the crown Ariadne. By Lorenzo De Ferrari is the stucco and fresco decoration with figures of deities on the vault (architecture) of the gallery. The salon, decorated by Tommaso Aldrovandini, contains five famous canvases with Stories of Diana by Marcantonio Franceschini, a Bolognese painter called to Genoa for the decoration of the Salone del Maggior Consiglio in palazzo Ducale.
