= Nociglia =

- Comune
- Comune di Nociglia
- Location within Italy Location within Apulia
- Coordinates: 40°2′N 18°20′E
- Country: Italy
- Region: Apulia
- Province: Lecce (LE)
- Frazioni: Montesano Salentino, Poggiardo, San Cassiano, Supersano, Surano

Area
  - Total: 10 km^{2} (3.9 sq mi)
- Elevation: 102 m (335 ft)

Population (November 2008)
  - Total: 2,518
  - Density: 250/km^{2} (650/sq mi)
- Demonym: Nocigliesi
- Time zone: UTC+1 (CET)
  - Summer (DST): UTC+2 (CEST)
- Postal code: 73020
- Dialing code: 0836
- ISTAT code: 075054
- Patron saint: Sant'Antonio da Padova
- Saint day: 13 June
- Website: Official website

Nociglia (Salentino: Nucija) is a town and comune in the Italian province of Lecce in the Apulia region of south-east Italy.
