= Raffaele Licinio =

Italian historian (1945–2018)

- Born: 1 February 1945; Ceglie del Campo, Bari, Italy
- Died: 4 February 2018; Foggia, Italy
- Occupations: Historian, professor

Raffaele Licinio (1 February 1945 – 4 February 2018) was an Italian historian, who, throughout his career, carried out extensive research into the medieval period in Southern Italy (the Kingdom of Sicily). He also taught medieval history at the University of Bari (Bari, Italy).

He's best known for his research on the Kingdom of Sicily during the rule of king Frederick II of Hohenstaufen and the castle Castel del Monte. His research focused mainly on the socioeconomic structure, the economic and agrarian development, the medieval fortification system and the institutions of Southern Italy in the Middle Ages. He also translated some French works into Italian.

In his works (especially in Castel del Monte e il sistema castellare nella Puglia di Federico II), he also condemned the widespread esoteric views and interpretations on both the castle Castel del Monte and the king Frederick II himself, spread even by notable scholars and historians. In particular, Licinio stressed that Castel del Monte was just one of the castles of the regional fortification system, and not a mysterious construction linked to the Knights Templar.

== Life ==
Raffaele Licinio was born in 1945 in Ceglie del Campo, a district of the Italian city Bari, Apulia. He studied literature and philosophy (Italian: lettere e filosofia) at the University of Bari, where one of his professors was Giosuè Musca. In the same university, he graduated in 1970 ca. with the highest score, while in 1974 he was appointed university assistant (Italian: assistente ordinario) in the subject of medieval history. In 1985, he was appointed professor (Italian: professore associato) of "medieval institutions" (Italian: istituzioni medievali) at the University of Bari, while in 1999 he became professor of medieval history in the same university. He was also appointed professor of medieval history at the University of Foggia, teaching in the same university from 2001 until 2007.

Since his youth, he was also actively involved in politics; he started joining some leftist non-parliamentary groups, and later he joined the Partito Comunista Italiano (the Italian Communist Party). His testimony also helped to identify the murderer of Benedetto Petrone, who had been stabbed to death in Bari on November 28, 1977, by a gang of neo-fascists.

== Career ==
- Professor of medieval history at the University of Bari
- Professor of medieval history at the University of Foggia (2001-2007)
- Head of the Centro di studi normanno-svevi at the University of Bari (2002-)
- Manager of the two-year international meetings Giornate normanno-sveve (2004-2010)
- Founder and director of the Scuola-Laboratorio di Medievistica di Troia (1995-1998)

== Works ==
=== Books ===
- Castelli, foreste, masserie: potere centrale e funzionari periferici nella Puglia del secolo XIII. Edizioni dal Sud. 1991. ISBN 978-8875530068.
- Castelli medievali.Puglia e Basilicata. Dai normanni a Federico II e Carlo d'Angiò. Edizioni Dedalo. 1994. ISBN 978-8822061621.
- Masserie medievali: masserie, massari e carestie da Federico II alla dogana delle pecore. Mario Adda. 1998. ISBN 978-8880822875.
- Castel Del Monte e il sistema castellare nella Puglia di Federico II. Edizioni dal Sud. 2001.
- Paesaggio mediterraneo. Puglia: una terra dai confini mobili. L'Araba Fenice. 2002. ISBN 978-8888691008.
- Castel del Monte. Un castello medievale. Bari: Mario Adda Editore. 2002.
- Il Mezzogiorno medievale nella didattica della storia. Bari: Adda. 2006. ISBN 978-8880826316.
- I caratteri originari della conquista normanna - Diversità e identità nel Mezzogiorno - Atti delle sedicesime giornate normanno-sveve - Bari, 5-8 ottobre 2004 (Centro di Studi Normanno-Svevi). Bari: Edizioni Dedalo. 2006. ISBN 978-8822041647.
- Nascita di un regno: poteri signorili, istituzioni feudali e strutture sociali nel Mezzogiorno normanno, 1130-1194. Adda. 2008. ISBN 978-8880827740.
- Storia di Manfredonia. Vol. 1. Edipuglia. 2008. ISBN 978-8872285404.
- Uomini e terre nella Puglia medievale. Dagli svevi agli aragonesi. Il canto dell'ulivo. Edizioni dal Sud. 2009. ISBN 978-8875530457.
- Castelli medievali. Puglia e Basilicata: dai Normanni a Federico II e Carlo I d'Angiò, presentazione di Giosuè Musca (2 ed.). Bari: Caratteri Mobili. 2010.
- Il naso del templare: sei saggi storici su templari, corsari, viaggiatori, mastri massari e monstra medievali. Caratteri Mobili. 2012. ISBN 978-8896989234.
- Uomini, terre e lavoro nel Mezzogiorno medievale (secoli XI-XV). Sede dell'Istituto, Palazzo Borromini. 2017. ISBN 978-8898079568.

=== Publications ===
- "Prontuario contro gli stereotipi e le interpretazioni fanta-esoteriche su Castello del Monte (article published on stupormundi.it)".

=== Foreword ===
- Marco Brando (2008). Lo strano caso di Federico II di Svevia. Un mito medievale nella cultura di massa. Bari: Palomar. ISBN 978-8876002861.

=== Appendix ===
- Marco Brando (2019). L'imperatore nel suo labirinto. Usi, abusi e riusi del mito di Federico II di Svevia. Firenze: Tessere. ISBN 978-8894432343.

=== Translated books ===
- Jean-Pierre Petit (1985). Il muro del silenzio. Translated by Raffaele Licinio. Edizioni Dedalo srl. ISBN 978-8822045560.
- Jacques Le Goff; Jean-Charles Sournia (1986). Les maladies ont une histoire [Per una storia delle malattie]. Translated by Raffaele Licinio; Nicola Coviello; Corrado Petrocelli; Franco Porsia. Bari: Edizioni Dedalo srl. ISBN 978-8822005182.
- Gérard Belloin (1993). I nostri sogni, compagni. Translated by Raffaele Licinio. Edizioni Dedalo srl. ISBN 978-8822001788.
- Jean-Pierre Petit (1993). Il geometricon. Storia di un fantastico viaggio nei mondi delle geometrie. Translated by Raffaele Licinio; F. Mvukiye. Edizioni Dedalo srl. ISBN 978-8822045577.
- Jean-Pierre Petit (1993). Le avventure di Anselmo - Cosa pensano i robot?. Translated by Raffaele Licinio. Edizioni Dedalo srl. ISBN 978-8822045522.
- Jean-Pierre Petit (1993). Le avventure di Anselmo - I buchi neri. Translated by Raffaele Licinio. Edizioni Dedalo srl. ISBN 978-8822045591.
- Jean-Pierre Petit (1993). Le avventure di Anselmo - Il Big Bang. Translated by Raffaele Licinio. Edizioni Dedalo srl. ISBN 978-8822045584.
- Jean-Pierre Petit (1993). Le avventure di Anselmo - Il volo. Translated by Raffaele Licinio. Edizioni Dedalo srl. ISBN 978-8822045539.
- Jean-Pierre Petit (1993). Le avventure di Anselmo - Informagica. Translated by Raffaele Licinio. Edizioni Dedalo srl. ISBN 978-8822045515.
- Jean-Pierre Petit (1993). Le avventure di Anselmo - L'inflazione. Translated by Raffaele Licinio. Edizioni Dedalo srl. ISBN 978-8822045553.
- Jean-Pierre Petit (1993). Le avventure di Anselmo - Tutto è relativo. Translated by Raffaele Licinio. Edizioni Dedalo srl. ISBN 978-8822045546.
- Jean-Loup Bourget (1993). Il cinema americano da David W. Griffith a Francis F. Coppola. Translated by Raffaele Licinio. Edizioni Dedalo srl. ISBN 978-8822045096.
- Pierrette Bello; Catherine Dolto Tolitch; Aline Schiffmann (1993). Raffaele Licinio (ed.). Contraccezione, gravidanza, aborto. Nuova Biblioteca Dedalo. Edizioni Dedalo srl. ISBN 978-8822060433.
- Georges Duby (1993). L'amore e la sessualità. Translated by Raffaele Licinio; V. Bajo; C. Petrocelli (2 ed.). Edizioni Dedalo srl. ISBN 978-8822005175.
- Henri Lefebvre (1993). Lo stato. La scienza nuova. Vol. 4. Translated by Raffaele Licinio. Edizioni Dedalo srl. ISBN 978-8822001504.
- Pierre Germa (1993). Da quando? Le origini degli oggetti della vita quotidiana. Prisma. Translated by Raffaele Licinio. Edizioni Dedalo srl. ISBN 978-8822045027.

== Works related to Raffaele Licinio ==
- Victor Rivera Magos; Francesco Violante (2017). Apprendere ciò che vive - Studi offerti a Raffaele Licinio. Mediterranea. Edipuglia. ISBN 978-8872288290.
