= Trolleybuses in Bari =

Electric transit system in Bari, Italy

Bari trolleybus system
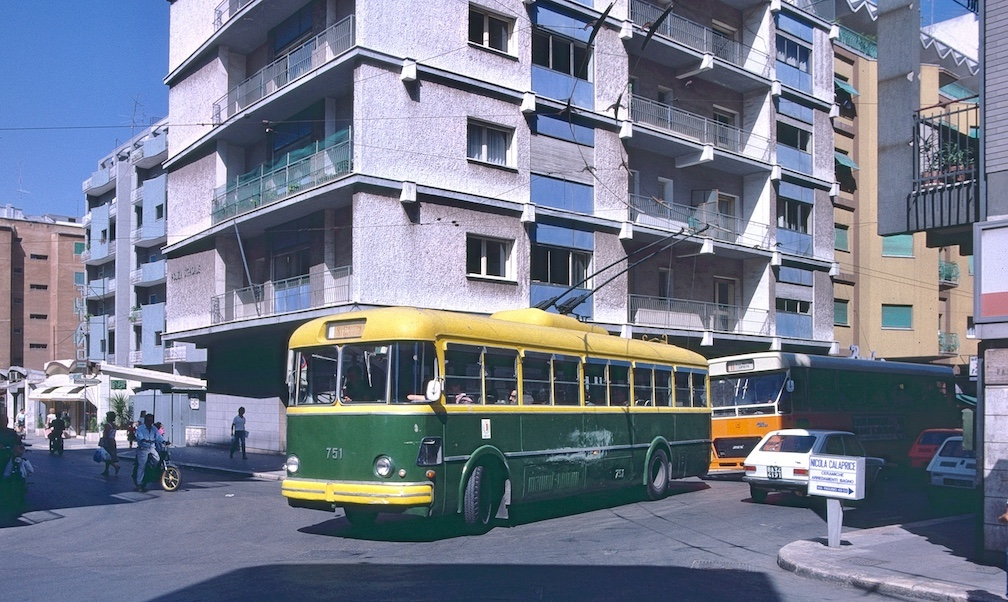
- A 1955 Alfa Romeo trolleybus in service on Bari route 8 in 1983

Operation
- Locale: Bari, Italy

Statistics
First era: 1939–1987
- Status: Closed
- Routes: 8
- Operators: 1939–1965: SAER; 1965–87: AMTAB
- Electrification: 600 Volts DC
- Route length: 36.25 km (22.52 mi)
Second era: 2000s
- Status: Never opened
- Routes: (1)
- Operator: AMTAB
- Electrification: 750 V DC
- Route length: Approx. 8 km (5.0 mi)

The Bari trolleybus system (Italian: Rete filoviaria di Bari) formed part of the public transport network of the city of Bari and the province of Bari, in the region of Apulia, Italy. Trolleybuses served the city from 1939 to 1987, on a network of several routes.

In 1990, less than three years after closure of the last route, it was decided to reopen one route of the former system, route 4 to Carbonara di Bari, but very little further progress was made over the next few years. Following subsequent decisions, new trolleybuses were purchased in the late 1990s and additional vehicles in the mid-2000s, and physical work to reopen route 4 of the former system began in 2008 and was completed in 2011, but the project never came to fruition. Construction of the renewed wiring and substations along route 4 was completed in 2011, and eight new trolleybuses were in stock by 2009 – five built in 1997 and refurbished (after more than a dozen years in storage) around 2010 and three brand-new trolleybuses delivered in 2009–2010 – and the vehicles made test runs on the refurbished line in 2010 and later, but the rebuilt and re-equipped system never opened, and no explanation was given by local authorities.

Meanwhile, an extensive length of overhead trolley wiring that was never part of the project to reopen one route as trolleybus remained in place in the mid-2010s, despite being unused for decades, but in 2021 the city council approved its removal. That work remained unfinished in November 2024 but was ongoing, and additional removals took place during that month.

== History ==
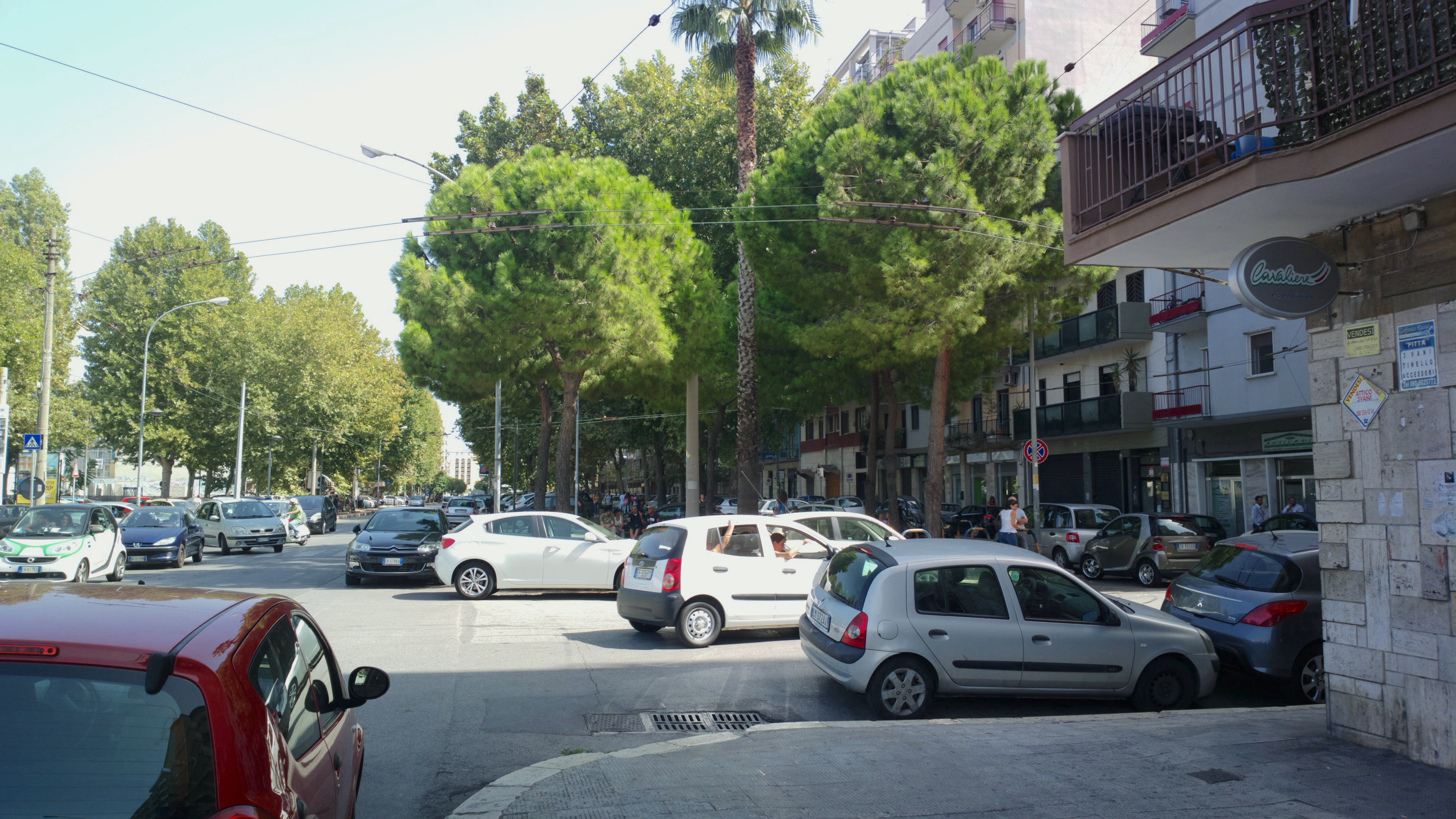
The former trolleybus turnaround loop on Corso Mazzini was still in place in 2015, about 30 years after the wires were last used.

The first trolleybus line in Bari began operation in 1939. It was constructed by the Compagnia Elettrotecnica Italiana (Italian Electrotechnical Company) but managed by SAER (Società Anonima Esercizi Riuniti Elettrica Nazionale). A significant expansion occurred in March 1952 with the conversion to trolleybuses of route 4, from Bari to Carbonara and Ceglie del Campo, a distance of 7 kilometres (4.3 mi). Additional routes were opened later, and in 1960 the system reached its maximum extent, with a network consisting of 8 routes (some periodic) with a total of 36.2 km.

In 1965, the public transport service in Bari was transferred to the Azienda Municipalizzata Trasporti Autofiloviari Bari (AMTAB), which began to close some trolleybus lines. On 1 September 1975, the entire system was shut down indefinitely due to a serious breakdown of an electrical substation and service remained suspended for more than three years. Trolleybus service resumed in November 1978 with the reopening of route 4, then route 4-barrato and finally (in June 1979) route 15, for a total of about 17 km.

In 1981, trolleybus service was also restored to route 8-barrato, and four routes were being served by trolleybuses:

- 4: Bari (Teatro Petruzzelli) – Carbonara – Ceglie
- 4-barrato: Bari (Teatro Petruzzelli) – Carbonara (a shortworking of route 4)
- 8-barrato: Corso Mazzini – Cinema Armenise (Via Giulio Petroni)
- 15: Corso Mazzini – Casermette

However, trolleybus service between Carbonara and Ceglie was discontinued in December 1981, with the withdrawal of route 4 (but not 4-barrato to Carbonara). This reduced the overall network to 15.4 km. In 1982, fares were still being collected by a conductor.

=== Closure of first system ===
In 1987, the property occupied by the trolleybus depot in central Bari was sold for redevelopment, and the depot closed and was soon demolished. As a result, trolleybus service ceased, the last day of service being 16 December 1987. A new depot had been built, but it was far from the overhead wiring, and was not equipped for trolleybuses. No connection between it and the route's wiring was built. As was normal for trolleybuses built before the 1980s, the fleet of trolleybuses lacked any equipment for operating away from the overhead wires. In the last few years of service, the only lines in operation had been 4-barrato, 8-barrato (renumbered as 8 by 1983) and 15.

=== Decision to rebuild ===
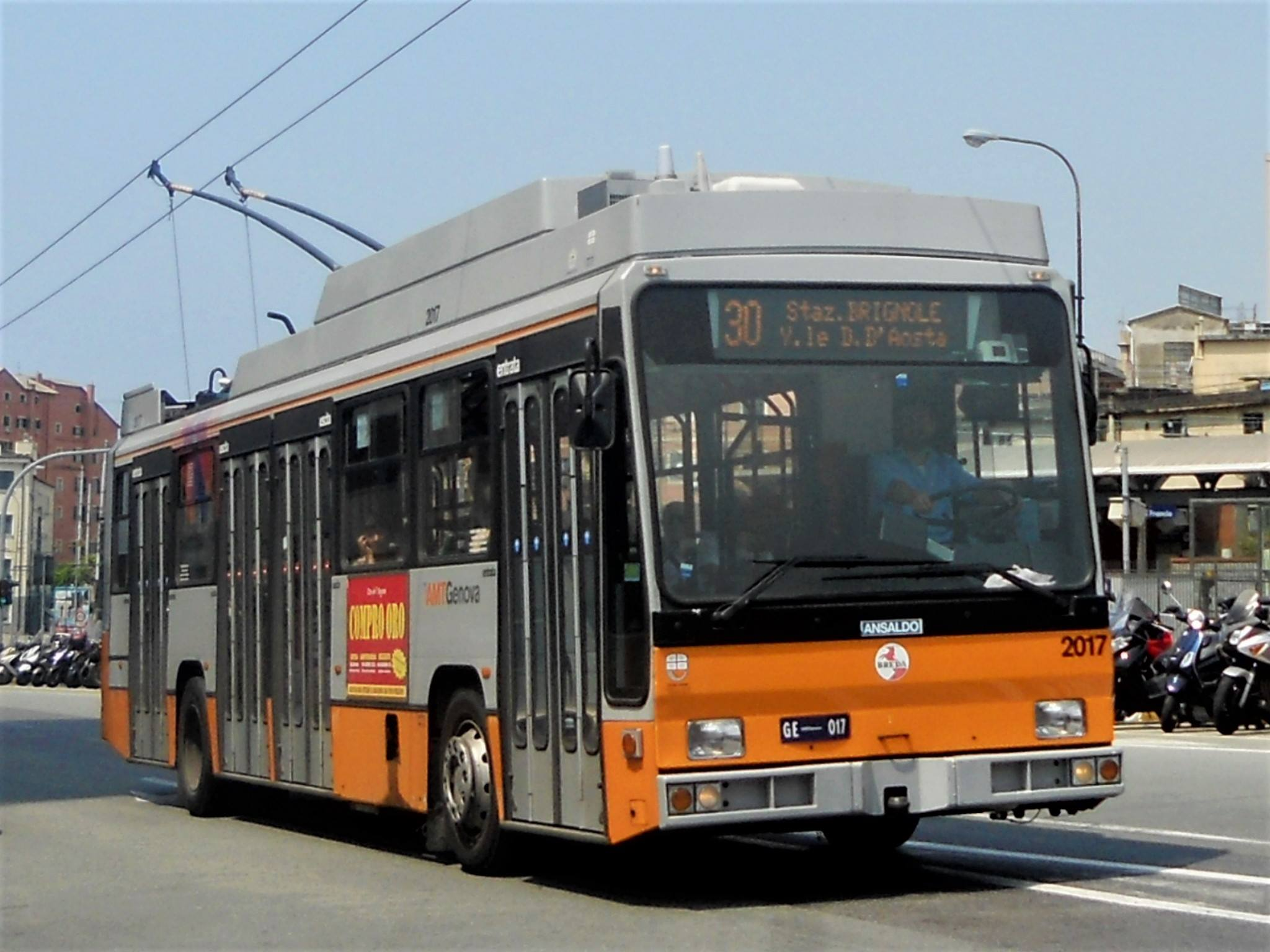
A Breda trolleybus of the Genoa system that was of the same type as the five Bari purchased in the late 1990s

In 1990, persuaded by the allocation of government grants for projects that would reduce pollution, the municipality and AMTAB decided to reopen trolleybus line 4. The work was contracted out to Breda Costruzioni Ferroviarie, which was to rehabilitate the electrical power system along route 4 and provide five new dual-mode trolleybuses. The five trolleybuses were completed around 1997. However, they remained at Breda's factory in Pistoia for the next several years, as a dispute arose between the company and the municipality. In addition, new European regulations required that the power supply system be modified to increase the voltage from 600V DC to 750V DC, also necessitating modification of the newly built vehicles. Breda Costruzioni Ferroviarie merged with Ansaldo Trasporti in 2001 to form AnsaldoBreda, and the dispute with Bari continued. By that time, the five trolleybuses had been moved from the factory to the plant of a Breda contractor in Bari, and at the end of the year were moved to the AMTAB depot. The legal dispute between the municipality/AMTAB and AnsaldoBreda was finally resolved in 2005, but little or no progress toward the planned reopening of the trolleybus system was made over the next two years. AMTAB became a joint-stock company (or S.p.A.) in 2003, and although the acronym form of its name remained unchanged, the letters now stood for Azienda Mobilità e Trasporti Autobus Bari.

=== Second renovation contract ===
In August 2008, a contract was awarded to a consortium led by the engineering firm SIRTI to resume work on renovating the infrastructure and to supply three new low-floor trolleybuses, to be built by Van Hool. The five 1997-built, high-floor Breda vehicles would also be modified and overhauled. In 2009, the municipality received additional funding of €2,830,000 to advance the project. The work began in December 2008, and its scope included upgrading of the traction substations to raise the line voltage to 750V. The three Van Hool A330T trolleybuses were delivered between July 2009 and autumn 2010.

In January 2010, two of the refurbished Breda trolleybuses were taken to Naples for test running on the wires of the Naples ANM trolleybus system, as the wiring and substations in Bari were not yet ready for use. The first test runs by one of the Van Hool trolleybuses in Bari took place in July 2010, and the Breda vehicles made test runs on their home system in December 2010, at which time officials were predicting that the system would reopen by summer 2011. The last construction was completed in 2011.

=== Project becomes dormant ===
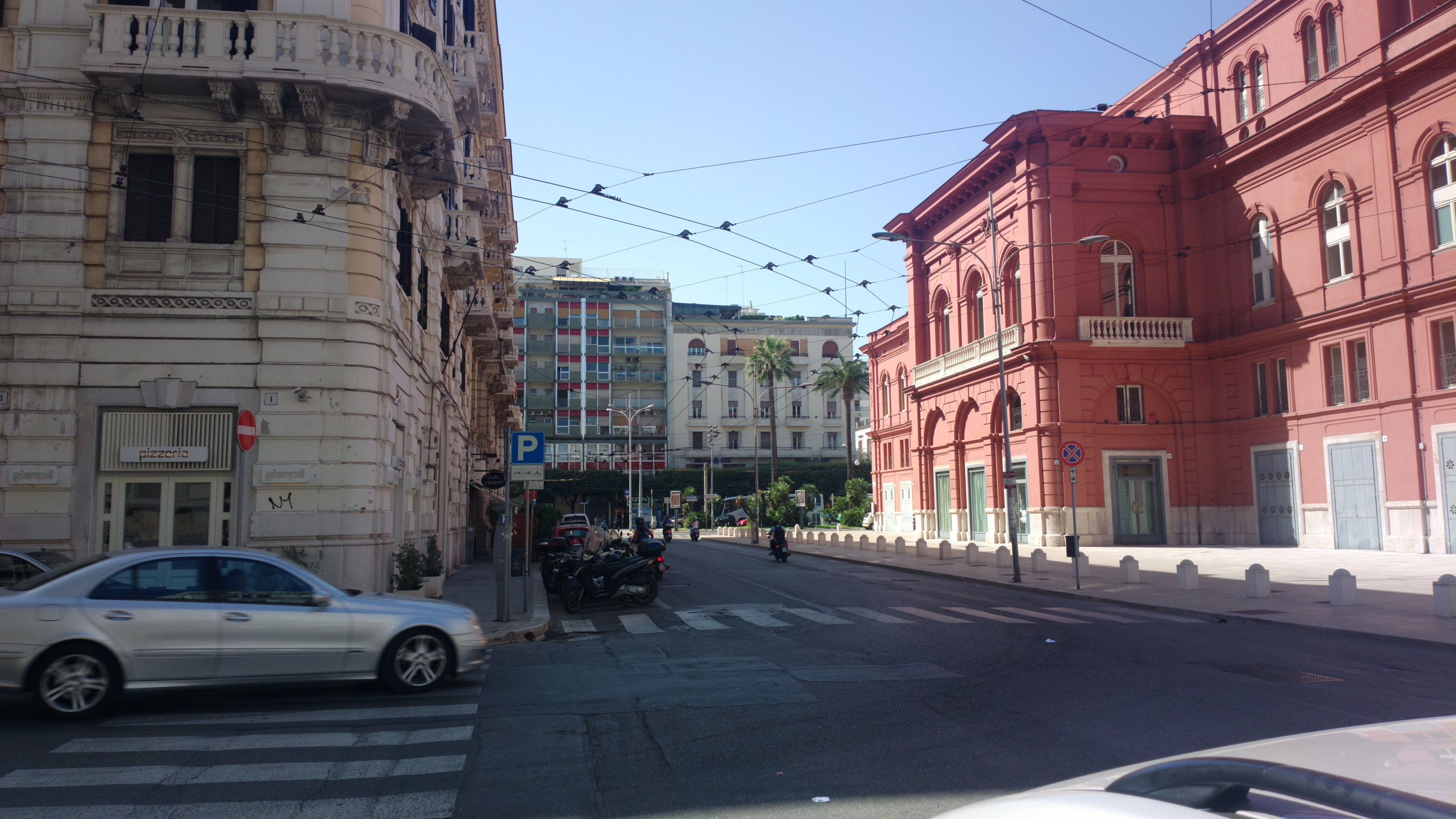
Trolley wiring disused since the 1980s was still in place in 2015, here next to the Teatro Petruzzelli.

As of early 2014, the rebuilt trolleybus system had still not reopened. Although the rebuilding and renovation of the infrastructure had been completed, testing and driver training had not, for reasons that were unclear. In April 2016, the three Van Hool trolleybuses were temporarily transferred to Lecce, for certification testing on the already-certified wiring of the Lecce trolleybus system by USTIF (a national regulatory agency for fixed-guideway transport, replaced in 2022 by ANSFISA).

Meanwhile, in 2015, a large amount of wiring from long-closed trolleybus routes remained in place, even though the last route of the previous system had closed in 1987 and only route 4 was planned to reopen. Around 15 km of long-disused wiring was still in place, most of it disused since the 1970s – more than in any other city in Italy – and consideration was being given to finally removing it. In 2021, the city council approved the start of work to dismantle all of the disused wiring, except along route 4. However, the eight trolleybuses purchased for the planned reopening of route 4 as a trolleybus route remained in storage.

Work on the removal of the long-disused wiring from other trolleybus routes remained unfinished in November 2024, but additional removals took place during that month.

=== Planned service ===
Route 4, which was planned to become trolleybus-operated before the project went dormant, as a motorbus route starts at Piazza Eroi del Mare in central Bari, but was planned, upon conversion to trolleybuses, to start at Via Capruzzi, on the south side of Bari Centrale railway station. From there, it runs south to Carbonara and Ceglie, ending just north of the town of Valenzano. South of Carbonara, where the last trolleybus service had ceased in December 1981, the overhead trolley wiring was a bi-directional single set of wires, and this configuration was retained after the 2009–2010 renewal work. The planned trolleybus route had an overall length of about 8 km (5 mi), but the southernmost 1 km of the route was not equipped with overhead wiring, and the dual-mode trolleybuses would have operated in diesel/hybrid mode over that section.

== Fleet ==
=== Pre-1988 fleet ===
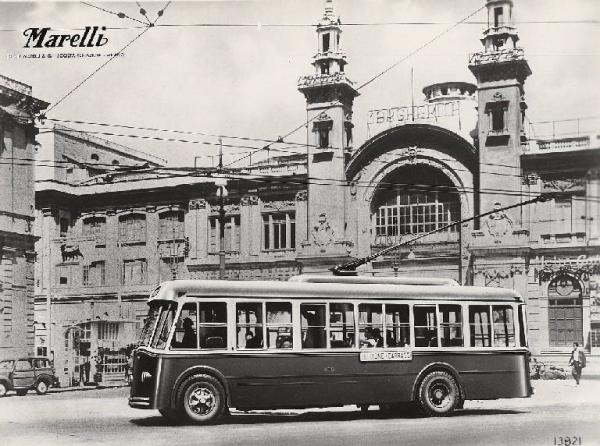
A Bari trolleybus built in 1949 by Fiat and fitted with a Cansa body and Marelli propulsion equipment

The past fleet included several groups of trolleybuses built by Fiat and by Alfa Romeo, and a single batch of five built by Breda. The only trolleybuses still in service in the last five years of the old system before its closure in 1987 were Alfa Romeo model 910 AF vehicles, from batches built in 1954 (series 701–705), 1955 (series 751–755) and 1958/59 (series 801–816).

=== Post-1997 fleet ===
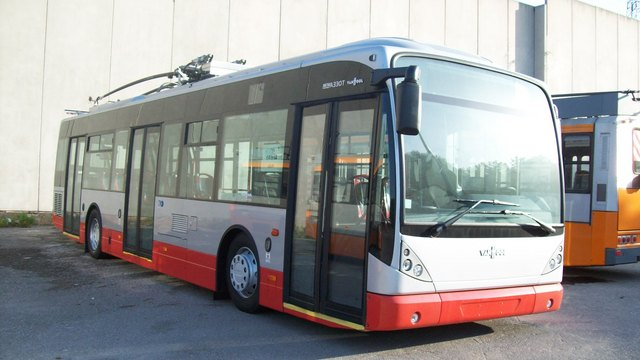
One of the three 2009-built Van Hool trolleybuses that have been in storage for many years, in 2023

The fleet that was acquired for the planned reopening that never occurred comprised the following eight two-axle, 12 m (40 ft) vehicles, all of which are either dual-mode or equipped with auxiliary power units, enabling them to operate away from the overhead wires to a limited extent:

- 5 Breda 4001.12 F15, high-floor dual-mode vehicles built in 1997
- 3 Van Hool A330T (with Vossloh Kiepe electrical equipment), low-floor vehicles built in 2009

Although both types of trolleybus carried out test runs on the refurbished wiring of route 4 in 2010, the planned reopening never took place, and the last known test runs using the overhead wires took place in July 2013.

== See also ==
- List of trolleybus systems in Italy
