= Castel del Monte, Apulia =

Medieval castle in Andria, Apulia, Italy

Castel del Monte
- Andria
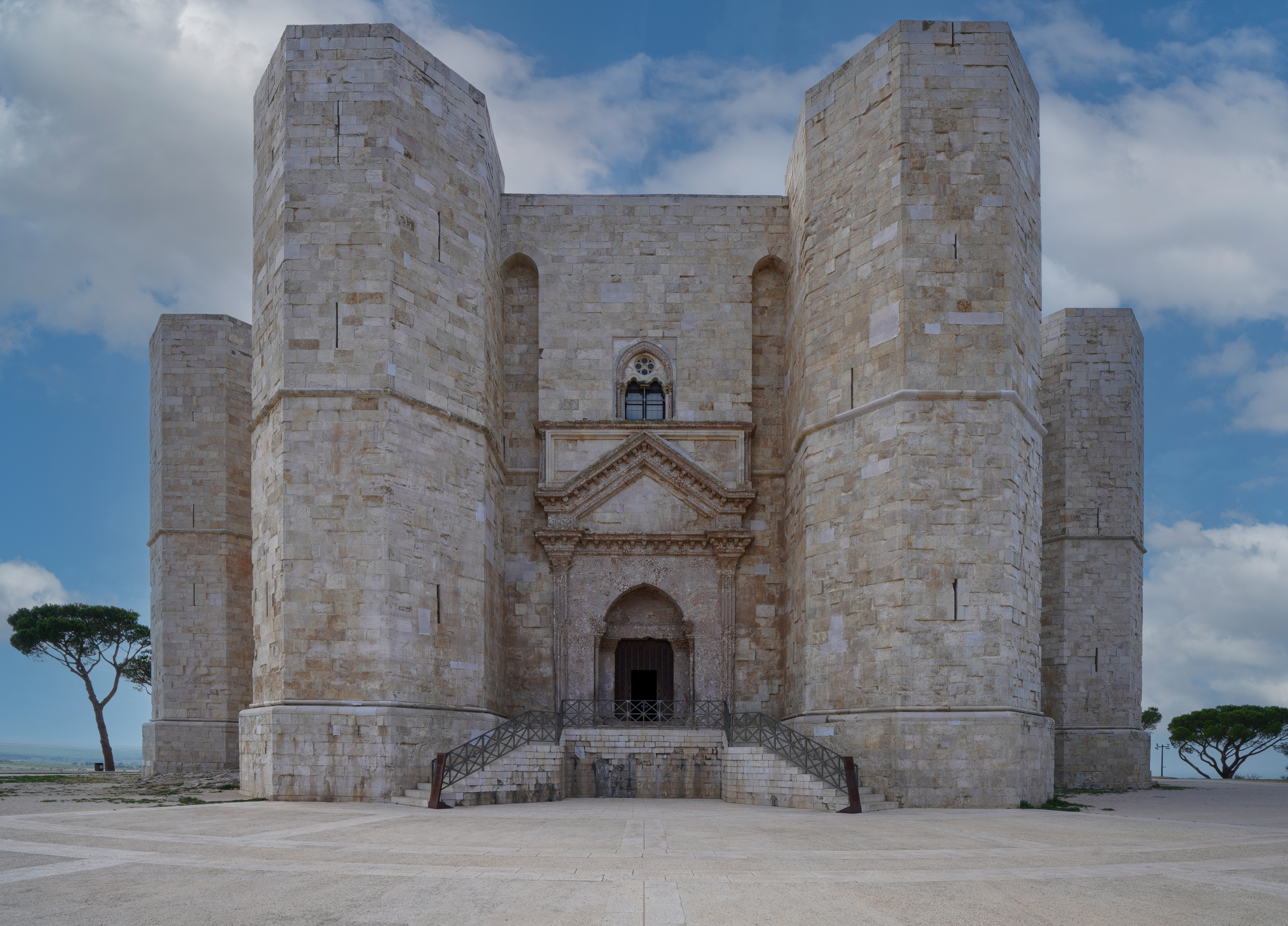
- Castel del Monte

Location
- Location within Apulia Location within Italy
- Coordinates: 41°05′05″N 16°16′15″E

Site history
- Built: 1240–1250

UNESCO World Heritage Site
- Location: Apulia, Italy
- Criteria: Cultural: (i), (ii)
- Reference: 398
- Inscription: 1996 (20th Session)

Castel del Monte (Italian for 'Castle of the Mountain'; Barese: Castidde du Monte) is a 13th-century citadel and castle situated on a hill in Andria in the Apulia region of southeast Italy. It was built during the 1240s by King Frederick II, who had inherited the lands from his mother Constance of Sicily. In the 18th century, the castle's interior marbles and remaining furnishings were removed. It has neither a moat nor a drawbridge and some considered it never to have been intended as a defensive fortress. However, archaeological work has suggested that it originally had a curtain wall.

The castle is famous for its bold octagonal plan, and classicizing details of the architecture. In 1996, Castel del Monte was named a World Heritage Site by UNESCO, which described it as "a unique masterpiece of medieval military architecture". Described by the Enciclopedia Italiana as "the most fascinating castle built by Frederick II", it also appears on the Italian version of the one cent Euro coin.

== Location ==
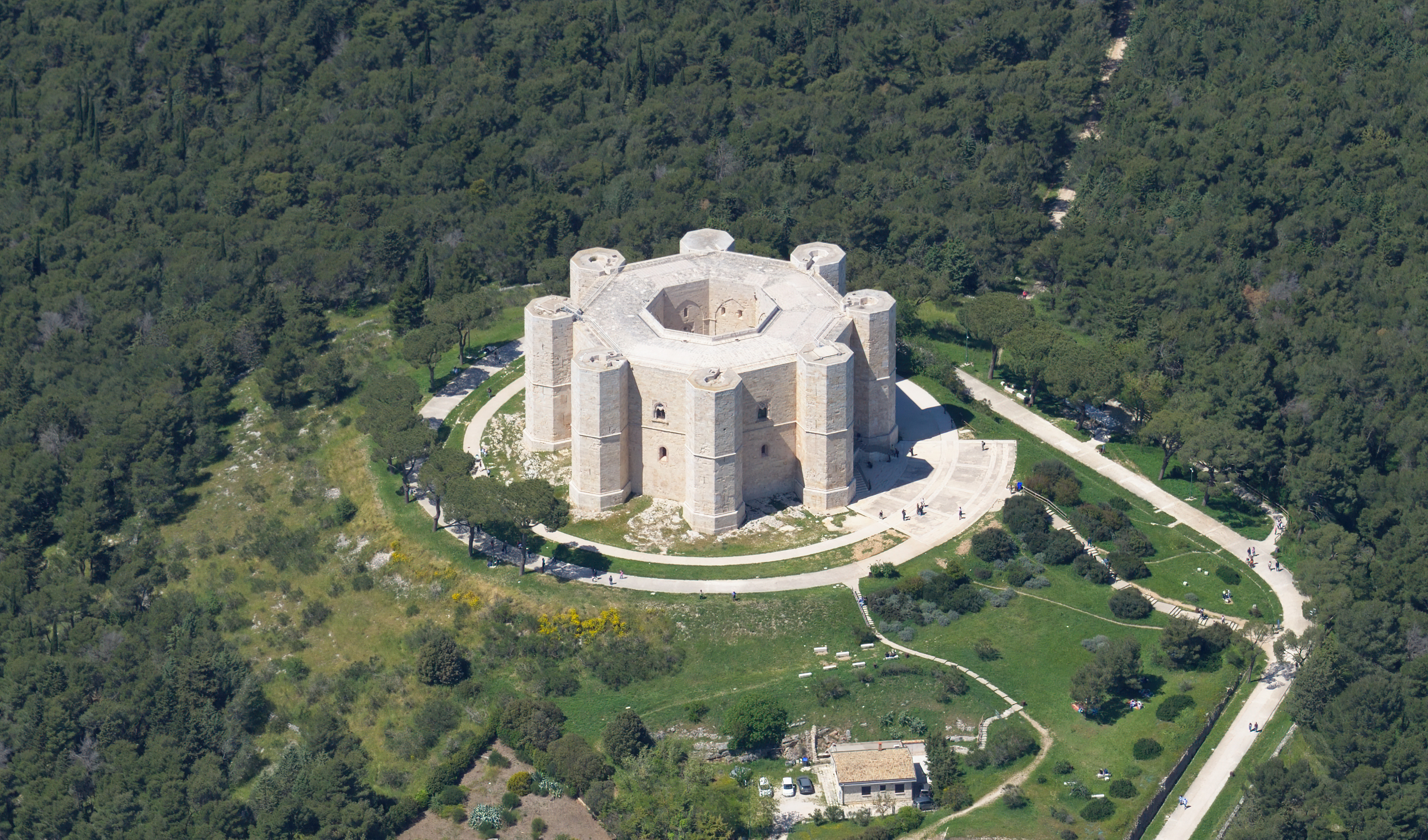
Castel del Monte seen from above

Castel del Monte is situated on a small hill close to the monastery of Santa Maria del Monte, at an altitude of 540 metres (1,770 ft). When the castle was built, the region was famously fertile with a plentiful supply of water and lush vegetation. It lies in the comune of Andria, province of Barletta-Andria-Trani, occupying the site of an earlier fortress of which no structural remains exist.

A document dating to 1240, in which Frederick II ordered the governor of Capitanata to finish some works in the castle. It was never finished and there is no proof that he used it as a hunting lodge as commonly thought. It was later turned into a prison, used as a refuge during a plague, and finally fell into disrepair. It originally had marble walls and columns, but all were stripped by vandals or reused in constructions nearby.

== Description ==
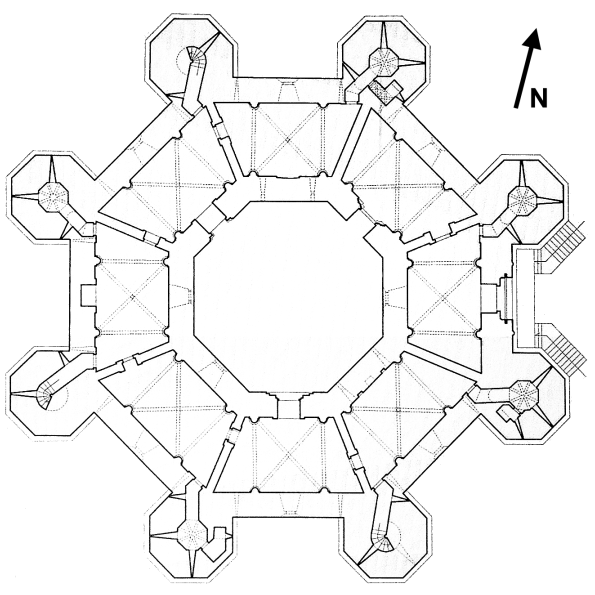
Octagonal plan of the castle.

Because of its relatively small size, it was once considered to be no more than a "hunting lodge", but scholars now believe it originally had a curtain wall and did serve as a citadel. Frederick II was responsible for the construction of many castles in Apulia, but Castel del Monte's geometric design was unique. The fortress is an octagonal prism with an octagonal tower at each corner. The towers were originally some 5 m (16 ft) higher than now, and they should perhaps include a third floor.

Both floors have eight rooms, and an eight-sided courtyard occupies the castle's centre. Each of the main rooms has vaulted ceilings. Three of the corner towers contain staircases. The castle has two entrances, an unobtrusive service entrance and an ornate main entrance. Frederick II's main entrance featured elements from classical architecture such a pediment supported by rather thin fluted pilasters, and may have been influenced by Frederick II's interest in Greco-Roman architecture.

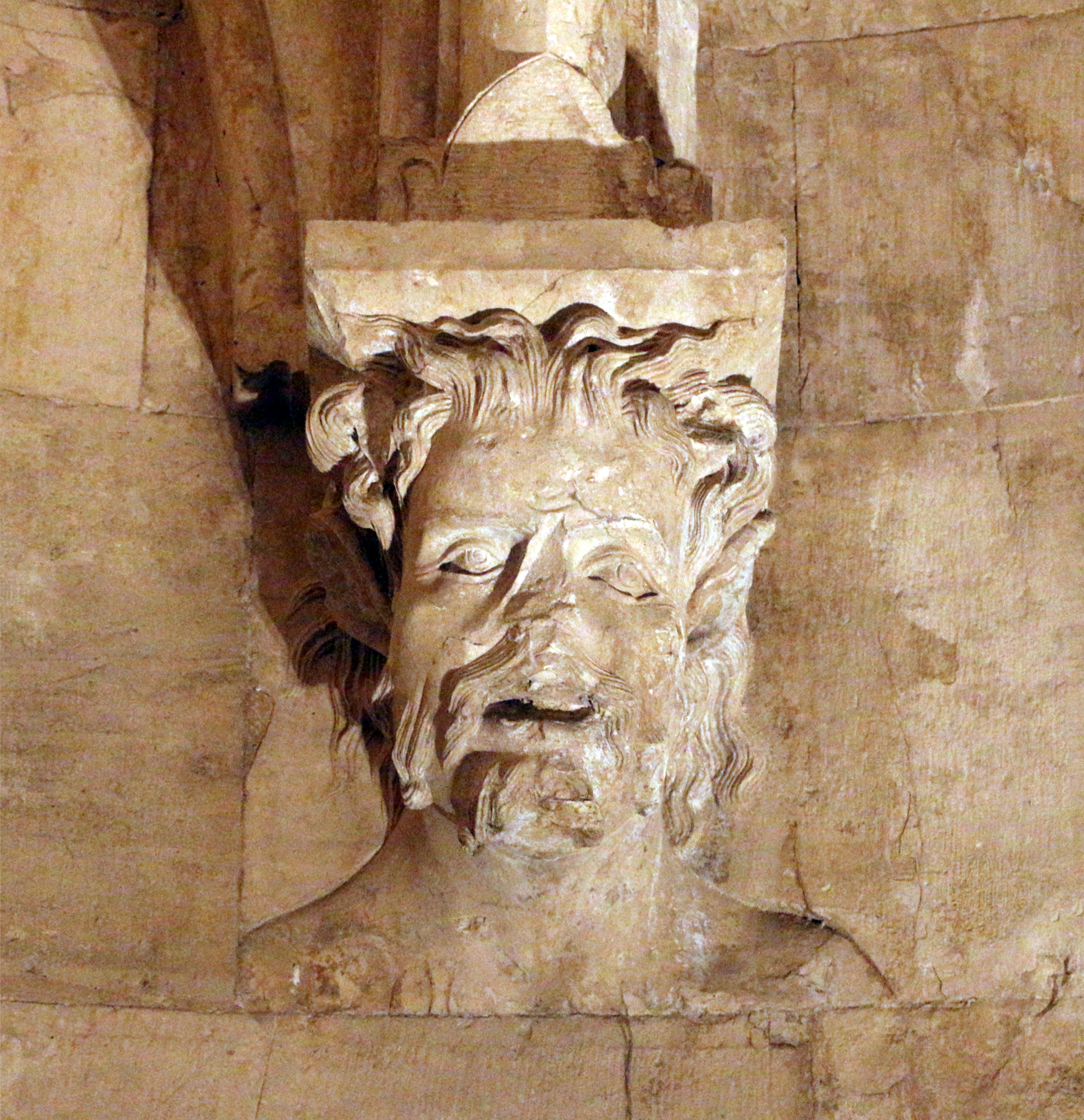
Capital with faun head

The octagonal plan is unusual in castle design. Historians have debated the purpose of the building and it has been suggested that it was intended as a hunting lodge. Another theory is that the octagon is an intermediate symbol between a square (representing the earth) and a circle (representing the sky). Frederick II may have been inspired to build to this shape by either the Dome of the Rock in Jerusalem, which he had seen during the Sixth Crusade, or by the Palatine Chapel of Aachen Cathedral.

Occasionally used as a hunting lodge under Manfred of Sicily, the castle became a state prison under the latter's victor, Charles I of Anjou: here Manfred's sons Henry, Azzo and Enzo were kept as prisoner after 1266, as well as other Hohenstaufen supporters.

The main wall is 25 m (82 ft) high and the eight bastions each 26 m (85 ft). The sides of the main octagon are 16.5 m (54 ft) long and those of the octagonal towers each 3.1 m (10 ft). The castle has a diameter of 56 m (184 ft). Its main entrance faces east.

== Modern era ==
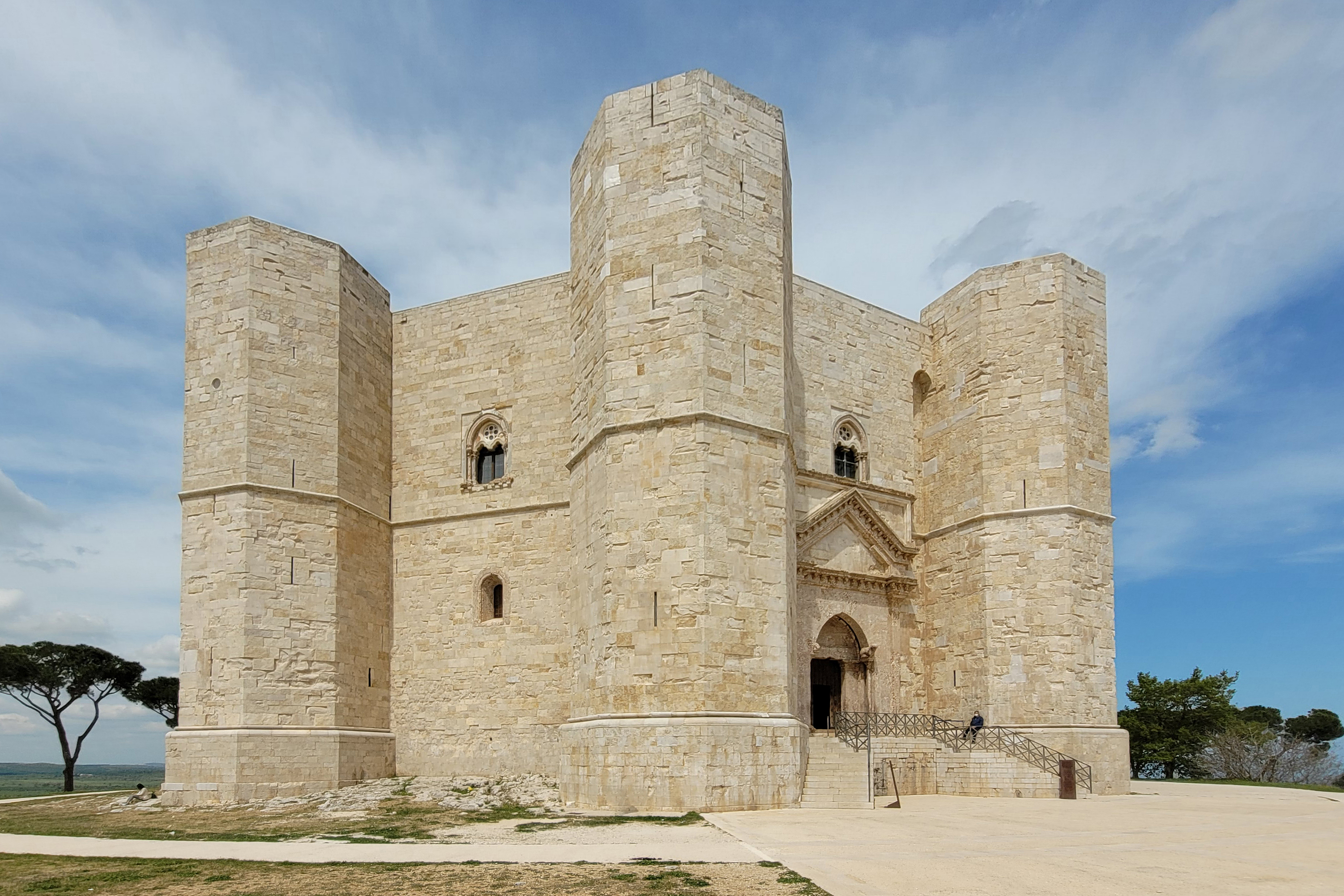
Rear and side view

In the 18th century, the castle's marbles and other ornamentation were looted. Members of the House of Bourbon took the marble columns and window frames and reused them at their palace in Caserta. What remains now includes fragments of a knight and a reused Roman relief, while in the Provincial Gallery of Bari there is a head fragment and a cloaked, headless bust, sometimes interpreted as Frederick II. After having been abandoned for a considerable length of time, the castle was purchased in 1876 for the sum of 25,000 lire by the Italian State, which began the process of restoration in 1928.

During the Allied occupation of World War II, the United States 15th Army Air Force headquartered a secret navigational aid station called Big Fence at the castle.

In the 1950s, soil around the castle was discovered to contain a bright red compound produced by a strain of the bacterium Streptomyces peucetius. Scientists named the drug daunorubicin and further development identified a related compound doxorubicin that finds use as a chemotherapeutic agent used to treat cancer.

Central to the plot of Umberto Eco's novel The Name of the Rose is an old fortress known as the 'Aedificium'. This was almost certainly inspired by Castel del Monte. It was also the set for the film Tale of Tales.

The castle has been often mistakenly linked to the Knights Templar and it has been regarded as a "mysterious" construction even by notable historians. Italian historian Raffaele Licinio often condemned those esoteric views and interpretations, stressing that Castel del Monte was just one of the castles of the fortification system developed by Frederick II, and it is not in any way linked to the Templars.

== Castel del Monte DOC wine ==
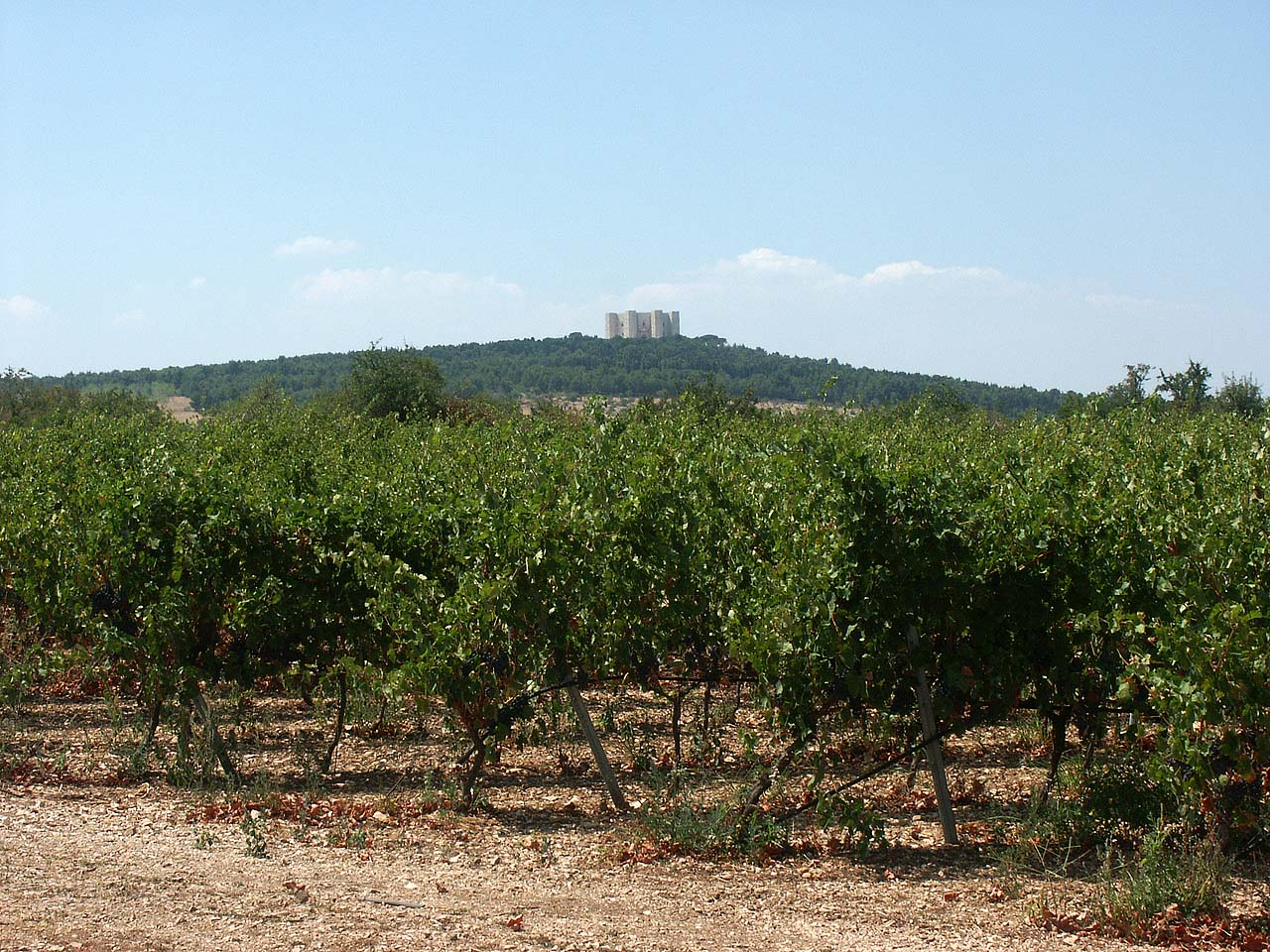
Vineyards, with the castle in the distance

Around the castle is the Italian DOC wine region of Castel del Monte that produces red, white and rose wines. Most of the wines are blends but varietal wines can be produced as long as at least 90% of the wine is composed of the same grape. The reds are usually a blend of 65–100% Uva di Troia, up to 35% of Sangiovese, Montepulciano, Pinot noir and Aglianico. The roses include 65–100% Uva di Troia and/or Bombino nero with the other red grape varieties filling out the rest. The whites are composed mainly of Pampanuto (65–100%) with other local white grape varieties filling out the rest.

Red and rose grapes are limited to a harvest yield of 14 tonnes/ha and must make a wine with a minimum of 12% alcohol level (11% in the case of rose). White wine grapes are limited to a harvest yield of 15 tonnes/ha and must make a wine with a minimum alcohol of 11%. If the wine is to be labeled a Riserva, the wine must be aged at least two years with one of those years in oak/wood and must have a minimum alcohol level of 12.5%.

== Gallery ==
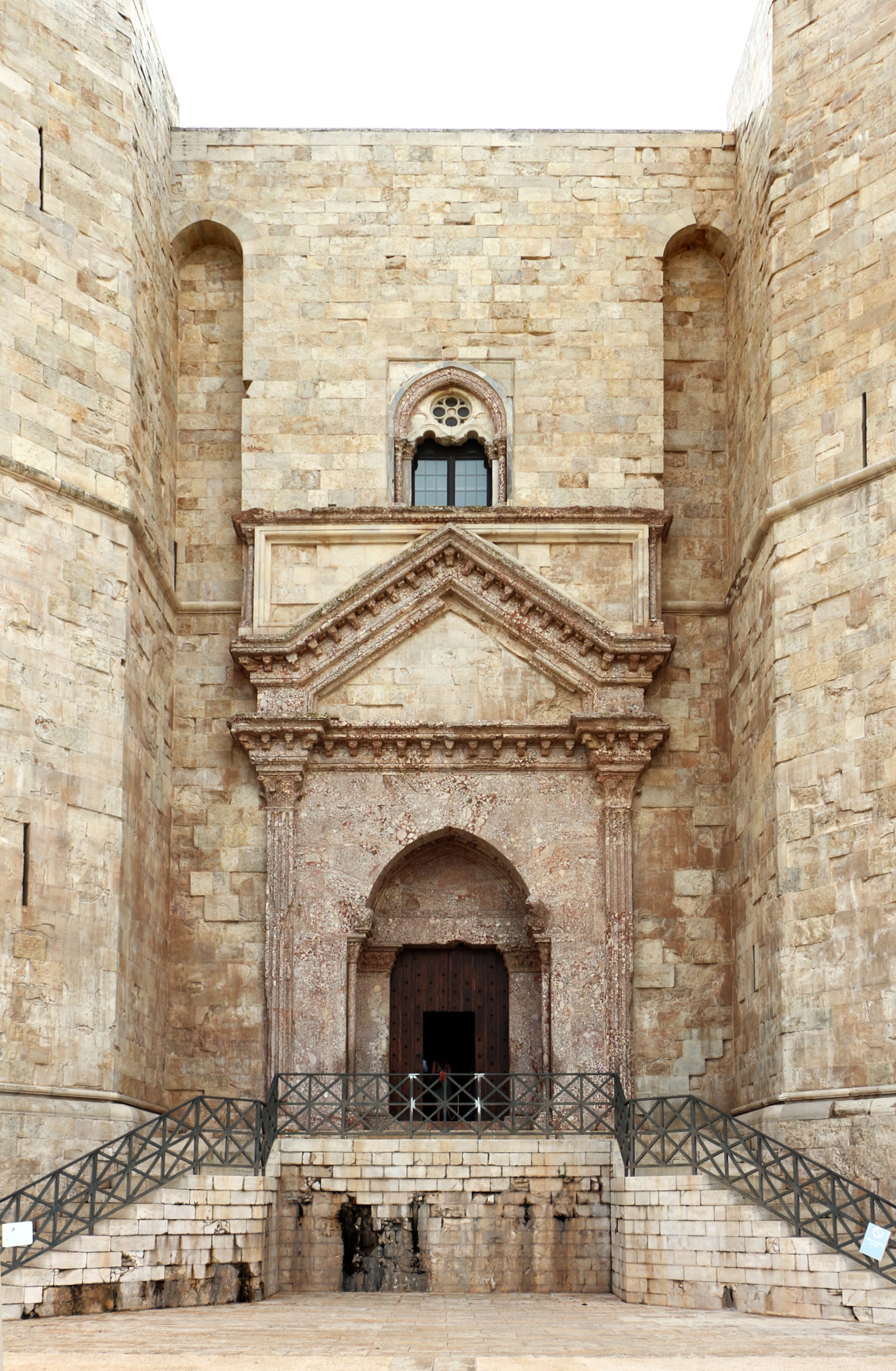
Entrance

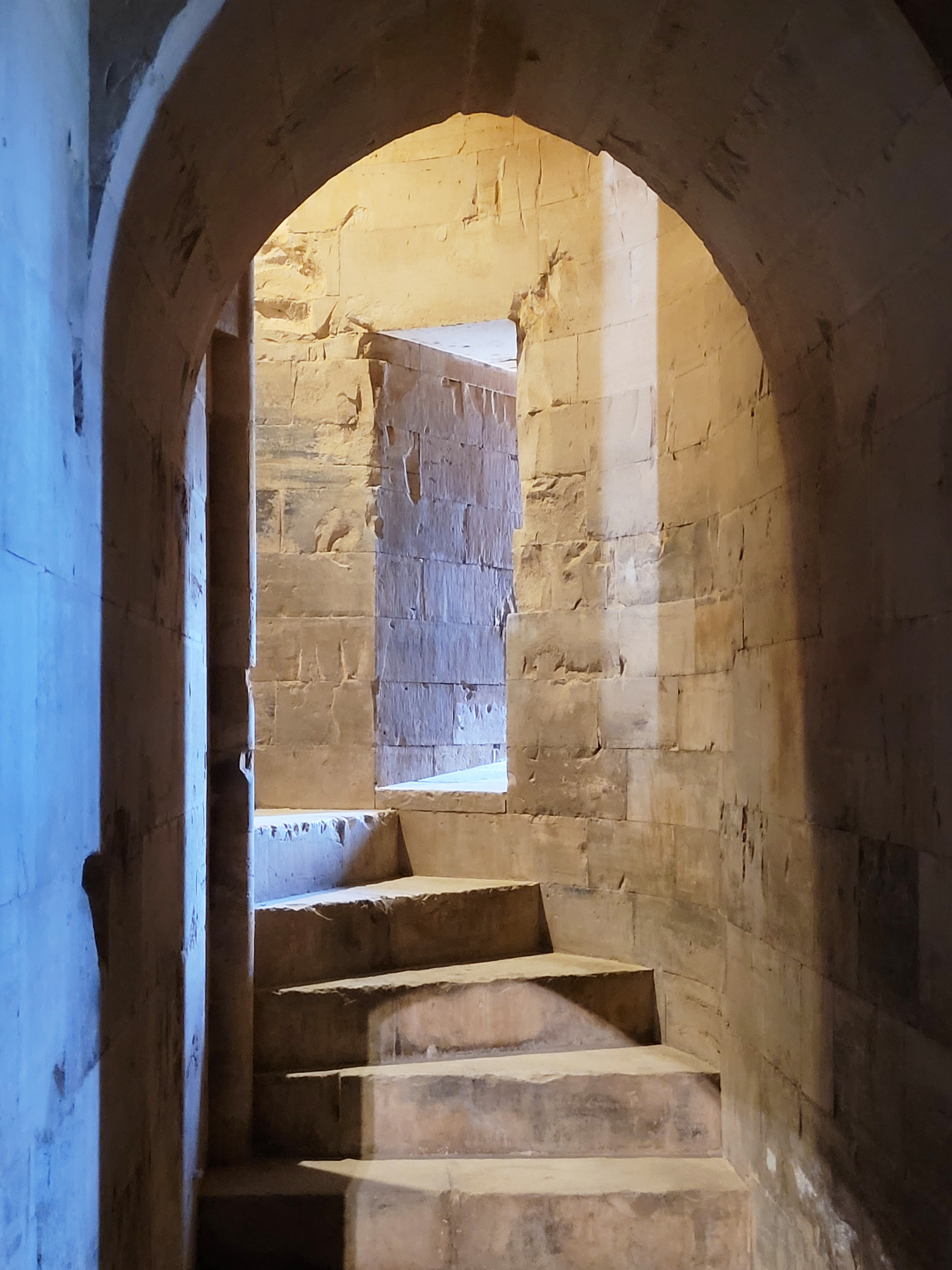
Stairs inside the castle

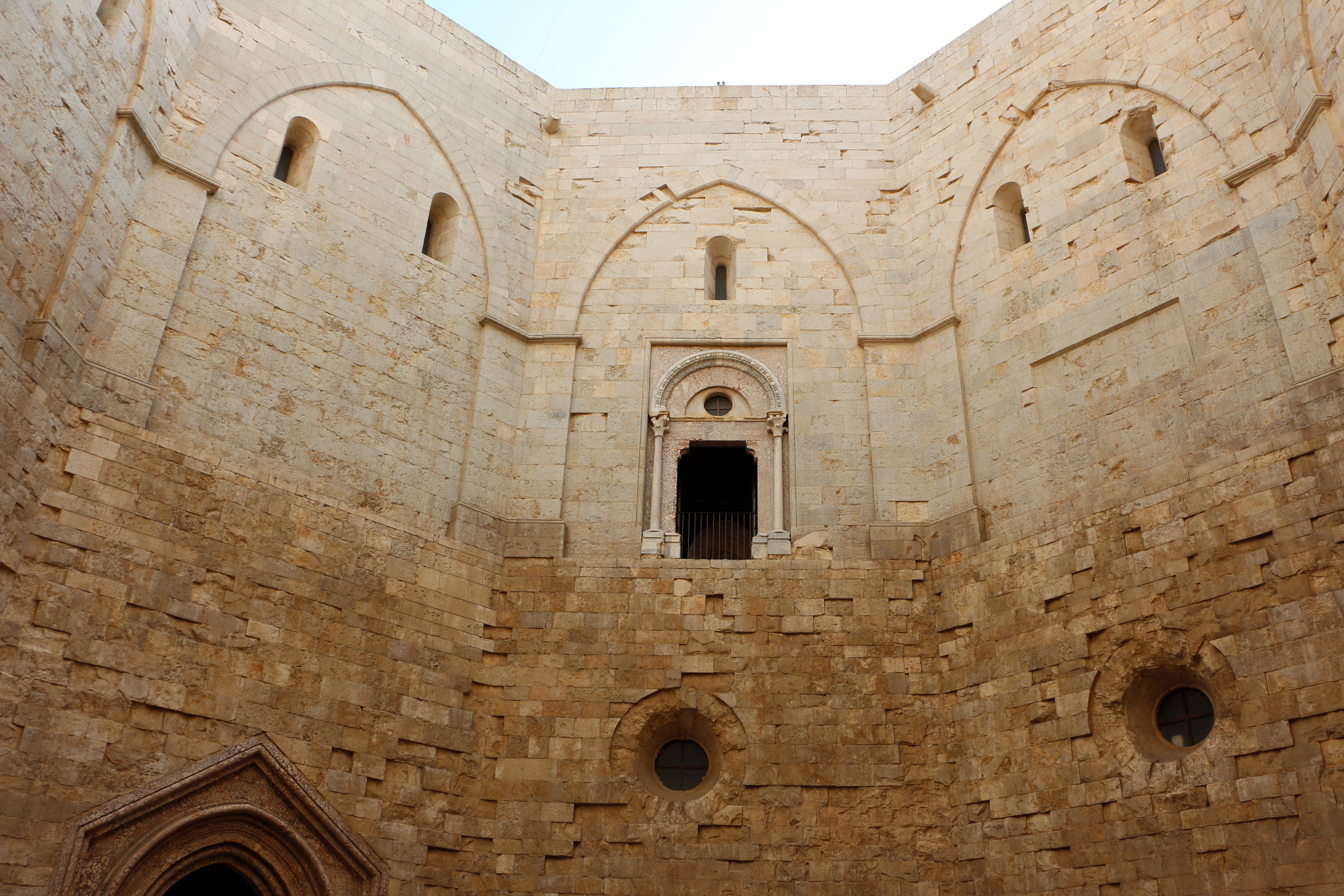
Courtyard

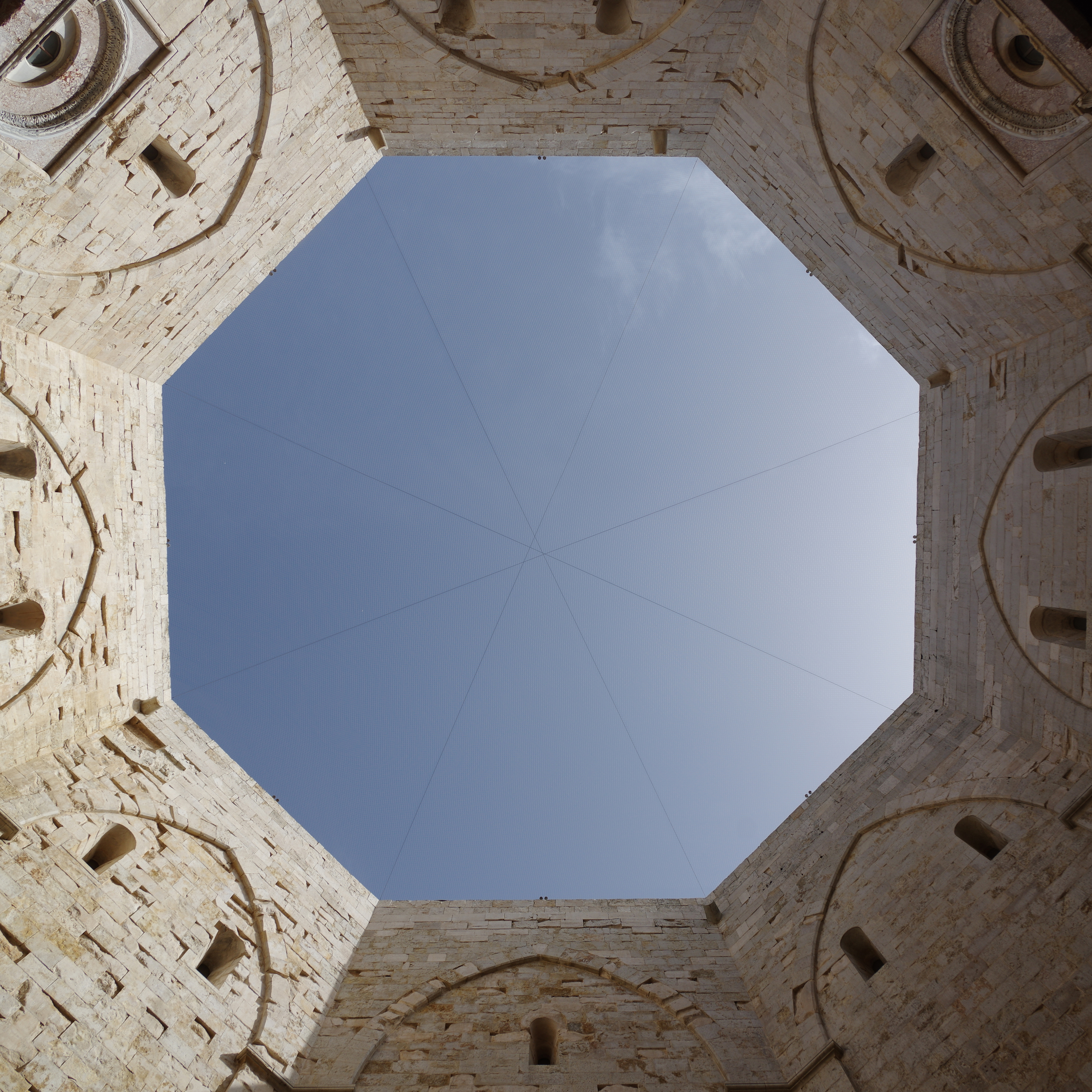
View from the courtyard

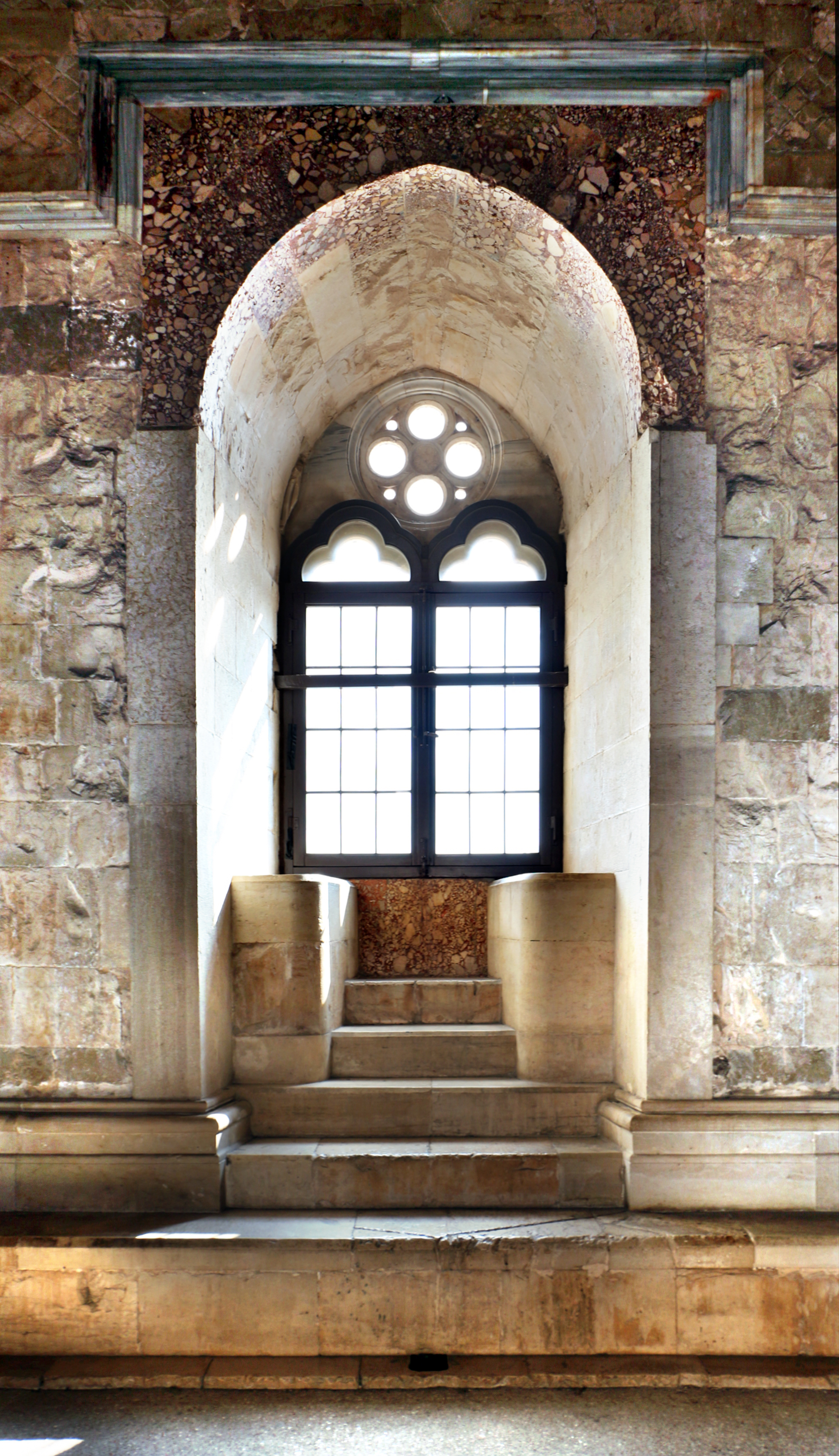
Throne room

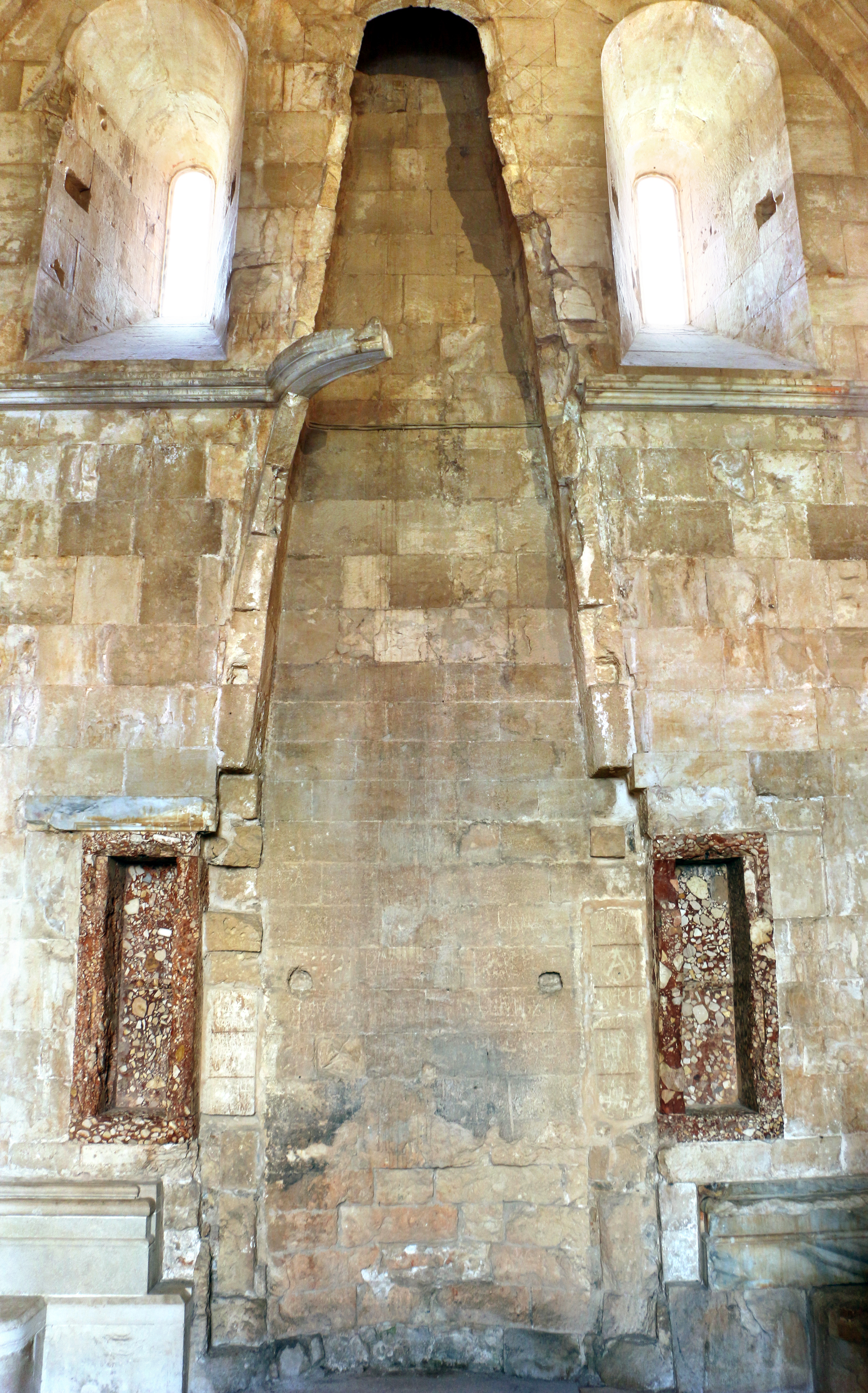
Fireplace remains

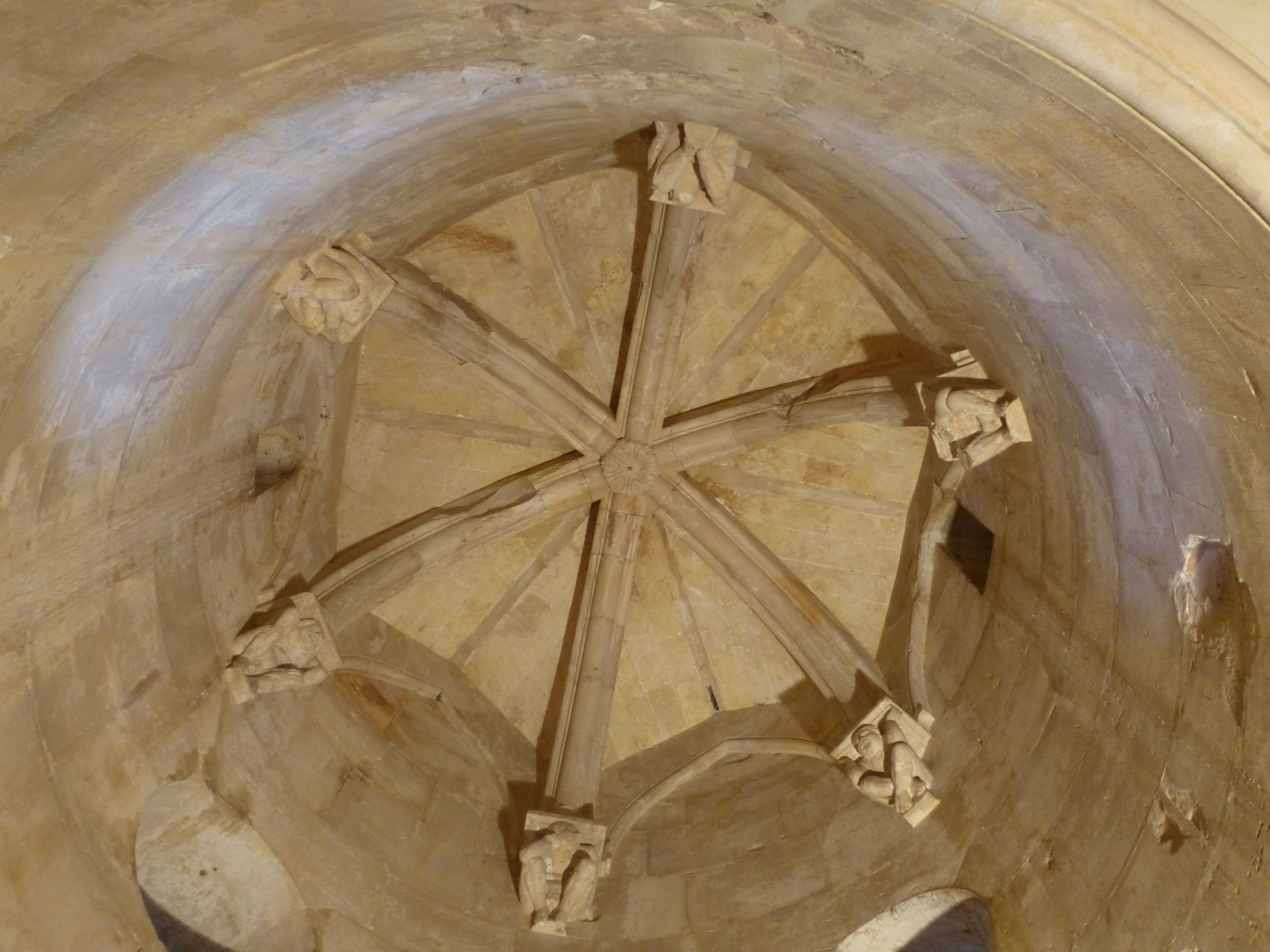
Tower ceiling
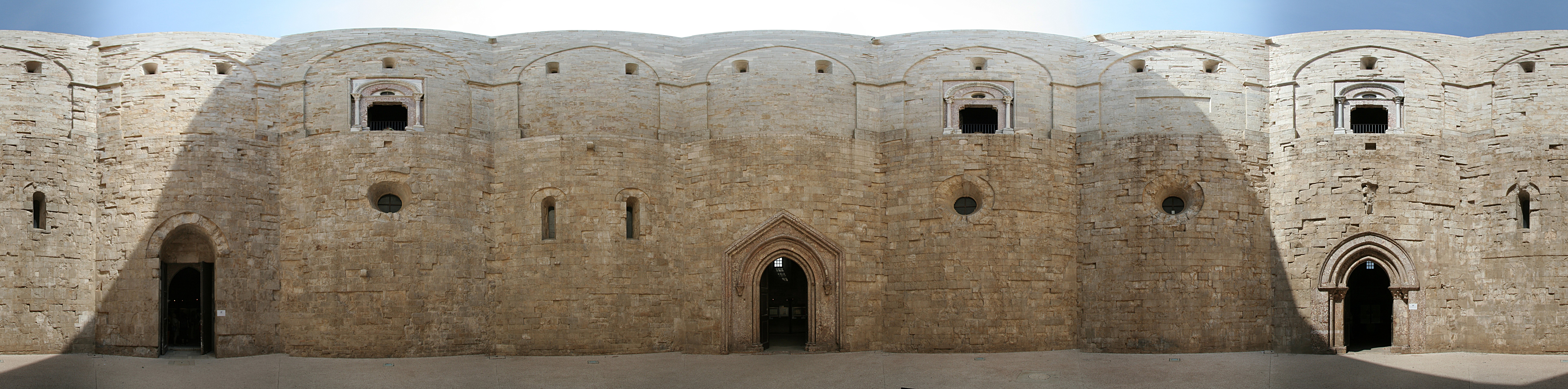
360° panorama of Castel del Monte's courtyard

== See also ==
- Cultural depictions of Frederick II, Holy Roman Emperor
- Arch of Augustus (Rimini) – an ancient Roman city gate said to share architectural references with the Castel del Monte

== Sources ==
- Castex, Jean (2008), Architecture of Italy, ABC-CLIO, ISBN 978-0-313-32086-6
- Haft, Adele J.; White, Robert J. (1999), The Key to "The Name of the Rose", University of Michigan Press, ISBN 0-472-08621-9
- Tuulse, Armin (2002) [1958], Castles of the Western World, Dover Publications, pp. 60–61, ISBN 0-486-42332-8
