= Ambrogio Grittani =

Italian, Servant of God

Venerable Ambrogio Grittani
- Born: 11 October 1907; Ceglie del Campo
- Died: 30 April 1951 (aged 43); Molfetta

Ambrogio Grittani (October 11, 1907 – April 30, 1951), was an Italian priest in the Roman Catholic Church. He founded the Oblates of Saint Benedict-Joseph Labre.

== Life ==
Grittani and his four brothers were orphaned by their parents in 1912, they later moved to his uncle's house in Bitritto. In 1928, he joined the Seminary of Bari and, later in 1924, he joined the Pontifical Regional Seminary of Molfetta. On July 25, 1931, he was ordained a priest, later gaining a degree in theology from the Pontifical Gregorian University.

During a stay in Assisi for a course of spiritual exercises, Grittani decided to dedicate his life to the poor. In 1943, with the help of volunteers he founded the Oblates of Saint Benedict Joseph Labre, named after Saint Benedict Joseph Labre. The oblate was later approved by the bishops of Puglia, in 1945. In 1948, the construction of the house was initiated to the accommodation of the brothers. Due to poor health and stress, Grittani died on April 30, 1951 in Molfetta.

== Beatification process ==
In 1990, his cause for beatification was opened. Grittani was declared venerable by Pope Francis on January 26, 2018.
