= Ceglie del Campo =

Quarter of Bari in Apulia, Italy

Coordinates: 41°03′N 16°52′E

Ceglie del Campo (Italian pronunciation: [ˈtʃeʎʎe del ˈkampo]), sometimes simply Ceglie, is a quarter of Bari, the capital of Apulia, Italy. It is situated south of the city centre.

Public transport connecting Ceglie with Bari is provided by AMTAB. Historically, trolleybuses of the Bari trolleybus system served Ceglie, from 1952 to 1981.

== People ==
Ambrogio Grittani (October 11, 1907 – April 30, 1951), was an Italian Servant of God, born here.
