= Big Fence =

US Army Air Force secret navigational aid for during World War II

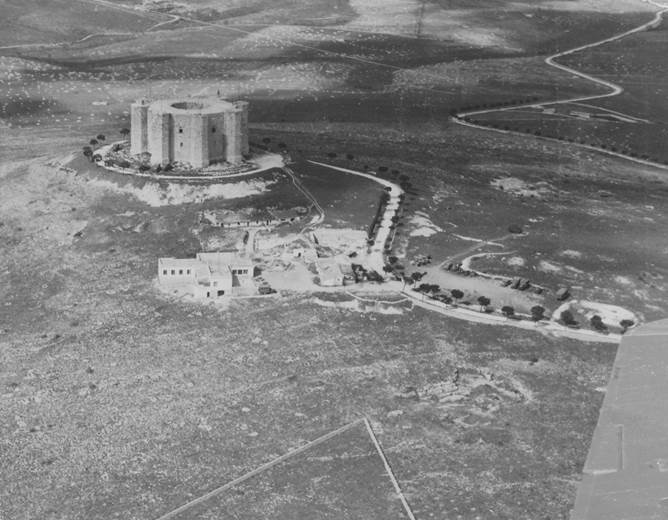
Castel Del Monte made an excellent landmark that could be seen for considerable distances during VHF site selection reconnaissance.

Big Fence was a secret navigational aid for US Army Air Force sorties from North Africa and Italy during World War II, ultimately located at the Castel del Monte in Apulia. It was operated by the 6649th Navigational Aids Squadron of the 341st Signal Company, XV Fighter Command, 15th Army Air Force.

The 6649th supported missions critically reliant on fixing the position of aircraft. Answering call sign "Big Fence", the central plotting room inside the castle triangulated information from seven direction finding installations, including the Castel headquarters.

From September 1943 until cessation of hostilities, the squadron received an estimated 16,000 calls for assistance from lost, damaged, and air-sea rescue craft.

Being a VHF system, Big Fence was particularly valuable to fighters, which only had VHF radios. The bombardment groups could often rely on other navigational aids that were at their disposal, but only VHF remained effective in bad weather.

Many hundreds of airmen owe their lives to “Big Fence”. The success of many missions was directly attributable to the efficient operation of your station. Please accept my personal thanks for your superior work with the 15th.

— Nathan F. Twining, Lt. General, 15th AAF Commanding, August 16, 1945

Please convey our hope that if the fortunes of war again bring us together, we may have the privilege of calling "Big Fence" in our hour of need

— Col. Robert H. Warren, 376th Bombardment Group (H) Commanding, June 1945
