= AMTAB =

Azienda Mobilità e Trasporti Autobus Bari
- Company type: Società per azioni
- Predecessor: SAER (until 1965)
- Founded: Bari, Italy 1965
- Headquarters: Bari, Italy
- Area served: Bari metropolitan area
- Key people: Pierluigi Vulcano (Chairman)
- Services: Bus lines, parking lots
- Owner: Comune di Bari
- Website: www.amtab.it

Azienda Mobilità e Trasporti Autobus Bari (AMTAB) (Mobility and Bus Transport Company Bari) is a public company, responsible for public transportation in Bari city in Italy.

== See also ==
- Trolleybuses in Bari
