= Messapic language =

Extinct Indo-European language of Southeastern Italy

Messapic
- Messapian
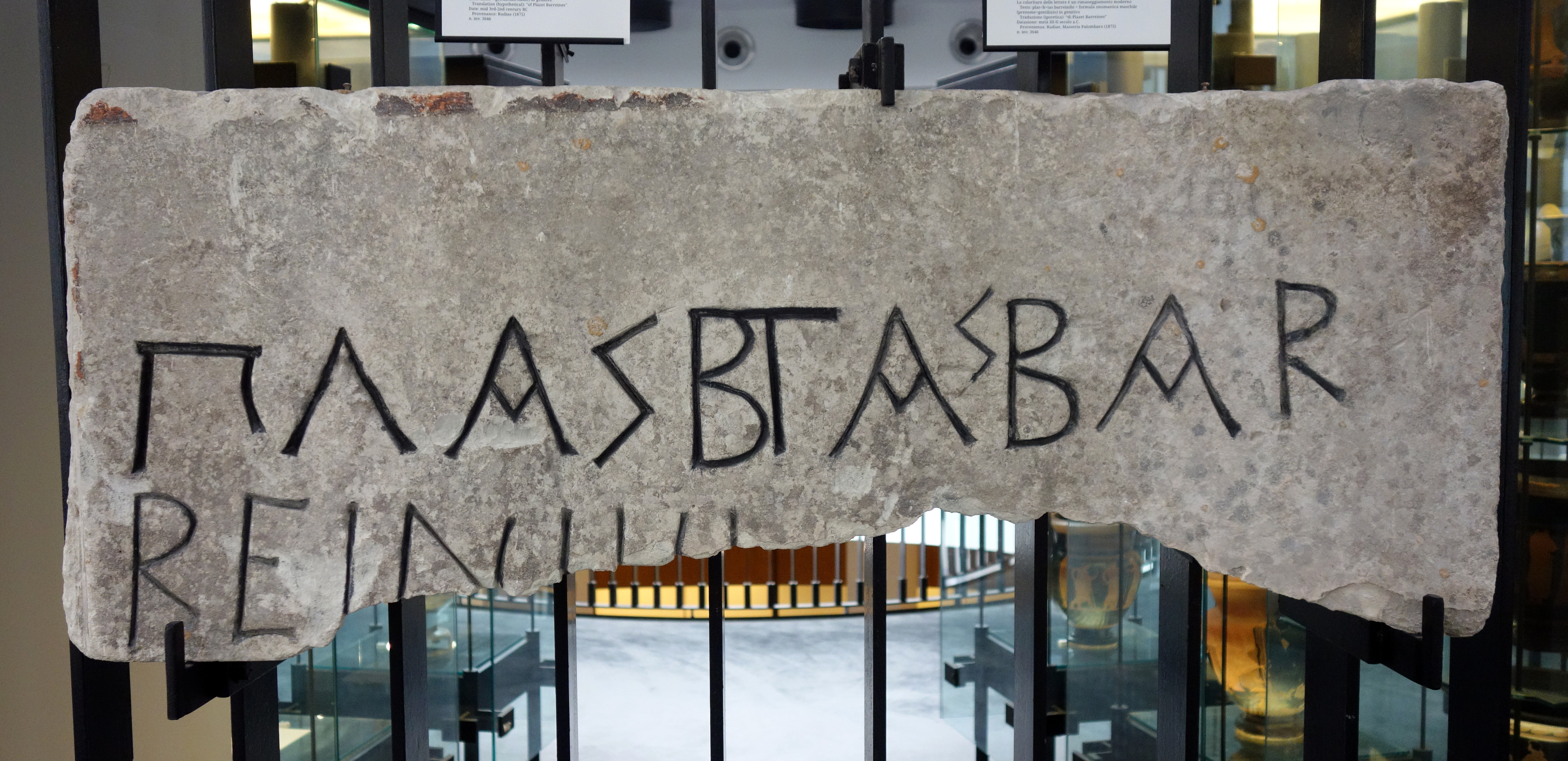
- 3rd–2nd century BC Messapic inscription
- Region: Apulian region of Italy
- Ethnicity: Iapygians
- Era: attested 6th to 2nd century BC
- Language family: Indo-European: Albanoid (Note: Supported by available fragmentary linguistic evidence that shows common characteristic retentions and innovations and a number of significant lexical correspondences between Messapic and Albanian.); Messapic
- Writing system: Messapic alphabet

Language codes
- ISO 639-3: cms
- Glottolog: mess1244
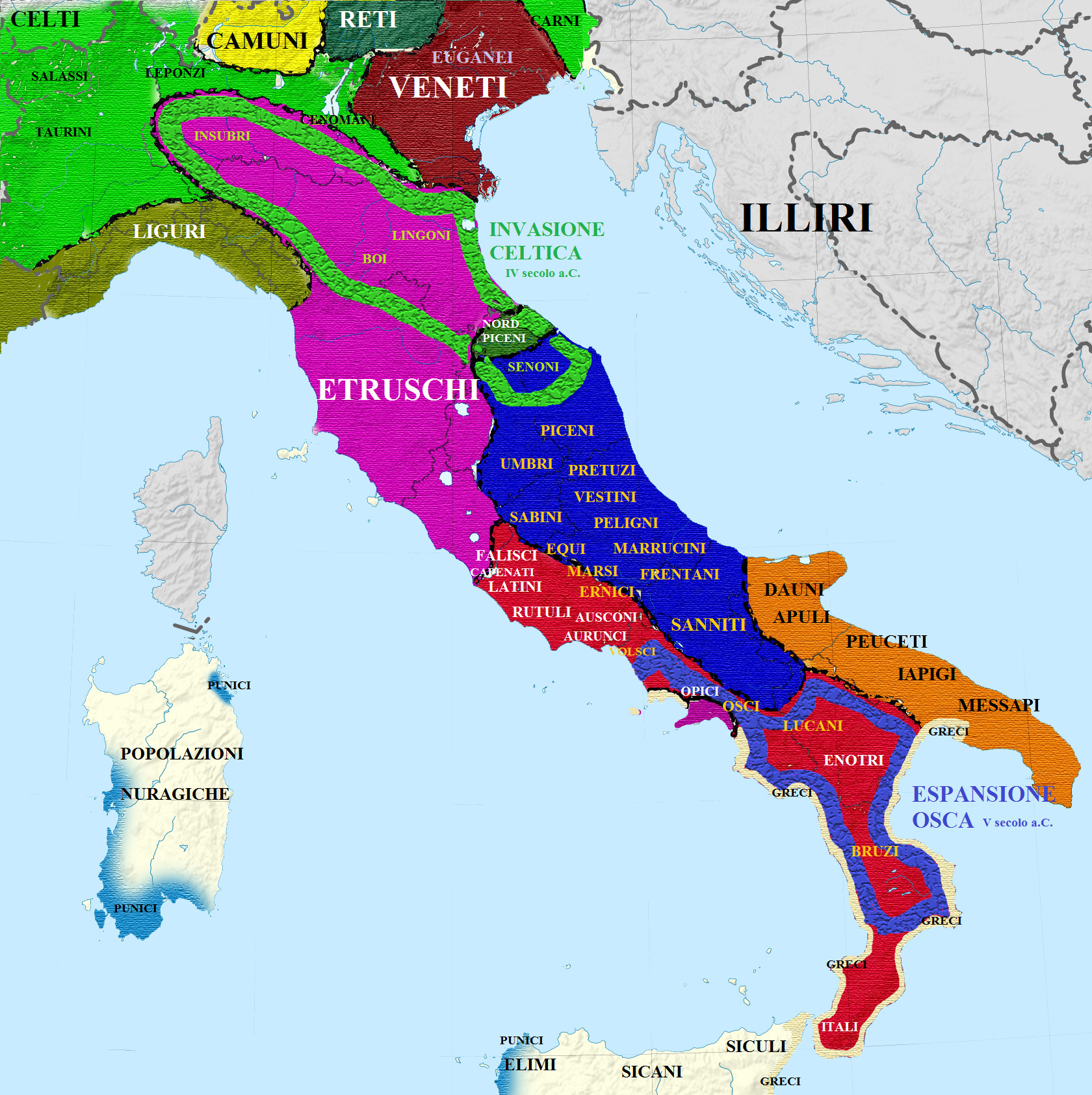
- Ethnolinguistic map of Italy in the Iron Age, before the Roman expansion. Messapic language area in orange (Iapygian peoples).

Messapic (/mɛˈsæpɪk, mə-, -ˈseɪ-/; also known as Messapian or Iapygian) is an extinct Paleo-Balkanic language of the Indo-European language family once spoken by the Iapygian peoples – the Calabri and Salentini (known collectively as the Messapians), the Peucetians, and the Daunians – in an area that roughly coincided with the modern region of Apulia, in the southeastern Italian Peninsula. Messapic was the pre-Roman, non-Italic language of Apulia. It has been preserved in about 600 inscriptions written in an alphabet derived from a Western Greek model and dating from the mid-6th to at least the 2nd century BC, when it went extinct following the Roman conquest of the region.

In current classifications of the Indo-European language family, Messapic is grouped in the same Indo-European branch with Albanian, which is supported by fragmentary evidence that shows common characteristic innovations and notable lexical correspondences, including the partial retention of the Proto-Indo-European three-way dorsal stop contrast, an otherwise rare feature in the Balkan–Adriatic region. Proto-Messapic migration from the opposite Adriatic coast through a trans-Adriatic interaction network is also confirmed by recent archaeological evidence dating to the period between 1700 BCE and 1400 BCE, in the post-Cetina horizon.

== Name ==
The term 'Messapic' or 'Messapian' is traditionally used to refer to a group of languages spoken by the Iapygians, a "relatively homogeneous linguistic community" of non-Italic-speaking tribes (Messapians, Peucetians and Daunians) dwelling in the region of Apulia before the Roman conquest.

However, some scholars have argued that the term 'Iapygian languages' should be preferred for referring to the group of languages spoken in Apulia, with the term 'Messapic' being reserved to the inscriptions found in the Salento peninsula, where the specific tribe of the Messapians had been living in the pre-Roman era.

The name Apulia itself may derive from Iapygia after passing from Greek to Oscan to Latin and undergoing subsequent morphological shifts.

== Classification ==
- Balkanic
  - Armenian
  - Graeco-Albanian
    - Graeco-Phrygian
      - Greek
      - Phrygian
        (extinct)
    - "Illyric"
      - Messapic
        (extinct)
      - Albanian

The Palaeo-Balkanic Indo-European branch based on the chapter "Albanian" (Hyllested & Joseph 2022) in Olander (ed.) The Indo-European Language Family

Messapic was a non-Italic and non-Greek Indo-European language of Balkan origin. Modern archeological and linguistic research and some ancient sources hold that the ancestors of the Iapygians came to Southeastern Italy (present-day Apulia) from the Western Balkans across the Adriatic Sea during the early first millennium BC. (Note: Wilkes 1992, p. 68: "...the Messapian language recorded on more than 300 inscriptions is in some respects similar to Balkan Illyrian. This link is also reflected in the material culture of both shores of the southern Adriatic. Archaeologists have concluded that there was a phase of Illyrian migration into Italy early in the first millennium BC."; Fortson 2004, p. 407: "They are linked by ancient historians with Illyria, across the Adriatic sea; the linkage is borne out archeologically by similarities between Illyrian and Messapic metalwork and ceramics, and by personal names that appear in both locations. For this reason, the Messapic language has often been connected by modern scholars to Illyrian; but, as noted above, we have too little Illyrian to be able to test this claim.") (Note: Boardman & Sollberger 1982, p. 231: "Apart from the spears and spear-heads of 'South-Illyrian' type (...), a connexion can be traced between Albania and Italy through various features in the pottery (shapes, handles; later on also painted geometric decoration); for although in Albania they derive from an earlier local tradition, they seem to represent new elements in Italy. In the same way we can account for the fibulae – typically Illyrian – arching in a simple curve with or without buttons, which one finds in southern Italy and in Sicily, and also some in which the curve is decorated with 'herring-bone' incisions, like examples from the eastern coast of the Adriatic. These influences appear finally in the rites of burial in tumuli in the contracted position, which are seen at this period in southern Italy, especially in Apulia. There is also evidence, as we have seen elsewhere, for supposing that in the diffusion of these Illyrian influences in Italy the Illyrian tribes which were displaced at the beginning of this period from the South-Eastern sea-board of the Adriatic and passed over into Italy may have played a significant role.")

=== Paleo-Balkanic ===
Messapic forms part of the Paleo-Balkan languages. Based upon lexical similarities with the Illyrian languages, some scholars contend that Messapic may have developed from a dialect of pre-Illyrian, meaning that it would have diverged substantially from the Illyrian language(s) spoken in the Balkans by the 5th century BC, while others considered it a direct dialect of Iron Age Illyrian. Messapic is today considered an independent language and not a dialect of Illyrian. Although the unclear interpretation of Messapic inscriptions cannot warrant the placement of Messapic in any specific Indo-European subfamily, some scholars place Illyrian and Messapic in the same branch. Eric Hamp has grouped them under "Messapo-Illyrian", which is further grouped with Albanian under "Adriatic Indo-European". Other schemes group the three languages under "General Illyrian" and "Western Paleo-Balkan".

A number of shared features between Messapic and Proto-Albanian may have emerged either as a result of linguistic contacts between Proto-Messapic and Pre-Proto-Albanian within the Balkan peninsula in prehistoric times, or of a closer relation as shown by the quality of the correspondences in the lexical area and shared innovations between Messapic and Albanian. Hyllested & Joseph (2022) identify Messapic as the closest language to Albanian, with which it forms a common branch titled Illyric, and Greco-Phrygian as the IE branch closest to the Albanian-Messapic one, in agreement with recent bibliography. These two branches form an areal grouping – which is often called "Balkan IE" – with Armenian.

==== Illyrian languages ====
Although the Illyrian languages – and to some extent Messapic itself – are too scarcely attested to allow for an extensive linguistic comparison, (Note: Matzinger 2015, p. 62: "Finché non sono risolti in maniera soddisfacente i vari e difficili problemi della fonologia storica dell'illirico vero e proprio è, al momento attuale, impossibile se non inutile effettuare una comparazione linguistica tra il messapico e l'illirico."; de Simone 2016: "For many years the study of Messapic was based on the assumption that the language was genetically related to Illyrian. The main supporter of this theory was the German scholar H. Krahe, though he eventually modified his views considerably. At present we prefer to see Messapic as an autonomous linguistic unit, with its own history, to be studied within the context of the other languages and the history of ancient Italy. Yet it may still be possible to establish links between Messapic, which is certainly an Indo-European language, and other languages genetically close to it. In fact we cannot exclude that Messapic was introduced into Italy (in several waves?) by ‘Illyrian’ speakers who came from the Balkans, though at present this cannot be verified.") the Messapic language is generally regarded as related to, though distinct from, the Illyrian languages. This theory is supported by a series of similar personal and place names from both sides of the Adriatic Sea. Proposed cognates in Illyrian and Messapic, respectively, include: 'Bardyl(l)is/Barzidihi', 'Teuta/Teutā', 'Dazios/Dazes', 'Laidias/Ladi-', 'Platōr/Plator-', 'Iapydes/Iapyges', 'Apulus/Apuli', 'Dalmata/Dalmathus', 'Peucetioe/Peucetii', 'Ana/Ana', 'Beuzas/Bozat', 'Thana/Thana', 'Dei-paturos/Da-matura'.

==== Albanian ====
The linguistic data of Albanian can be used to compensate for the lack of fundamental information on Illyrian, since Proto-Albanian (the ancestor language of Albanian) was likewise an Indo-European language certainly spoken in the Balkans in antiquity, and probably since at least the 7th century BC, as suggested by the presence of archaic loanwords from Ancient Greek.

A number of linguistic cognates with Albanian have been proposed, such as Messapic aran and Albanian arë ("field"), biliā and bijë ("daughter"), or menza- and mëz ("foal"). The toponomy points to a link between the two languages, as some towns in Apulia have no etymological forms outside Albanian linguistic sources. Other linguistic elements such as particles, prepositions, suffixes, lexicon, but also toponyms, anthroponyms and theonyms of the Messapic language find singular affinities with Albanian. Some phonological data can also be compared between the two languages, and it seems likely that Messapic belongs, like Albanian, to a specific subgroup of the Indo-European languages that shows distinct reflections of all the three dorsal consonant rows. In the nominal context, both Messapic and Albanian continue, in the masculine terms in -o-, the Indo-European ending *-osyo (Messapic -aihi, Albanian -i / -u).

Regarding the verbal system, both Messapic and Albanian have formally and semantically preserved the two Indo-European subjunctive and optative moods. If the reconstructions are correct, we can find, in the preterital system of Messapic, reflections of a formation in *-s- (which in other Indo-European languages are featured in the suffix of the sigmatic aorist), as in the 3rd sg. hipades/opades ('he dedicated' < *supo-dʰeh₁-s-t) and in the 3rd pl. stahan ('they placed' < *stah₂-s-n°t). In Albanian, this formation was likewise featured in the category of aorists formed with the suffix -v-. However, except for the dorsal consonant rows, these similarities do not provide elements exclusively relating Messapic and Albanian, and only a few morphological data are comparable.

== History ==
Iapygian migrations in the early first millennium BC.

The development of a distinct Iapygian culture in southeastern Italy is widely considered to be the result of a confluence of local Apulian material cultures with Balkanic traditions following the cross-Adriatic migrations of proto-Messapic speakers in the early first millennium BC.

The Iapygians most likely left the eastern coasts of the Adriatic for the Italian Peninsula from the 11th century BC onwards, merging with pre-existing Italic and Mycenean cultures and providing a decisive cultural and linguistic imprint. Throughout the second half of the 8th century, contacts between Messapians and Greeks must have been intense and continuous; they began to intensify after the foundation of Taras by Spartan colonists around the end of the century. Despite its geographical proximity with Magna Graecia, however, Iapygia was generally not encompassed in Greek colonial territories, and with the exception of Taras, the inhabitants were evidently able to avoid other Greek colonies in the region. During the 6th century BC Messapia, and more marginally Peucetia, underwent Hellenizing cultural influences, mainly from the nearby Taras. The use of writing systems was introduced during this period, with the acquisition of the Laconian-Tarantine alphabet and its progressive adaptation to the Messapic language. The oldest known Messapic texts date to the 6th century–early 5th century BCE.

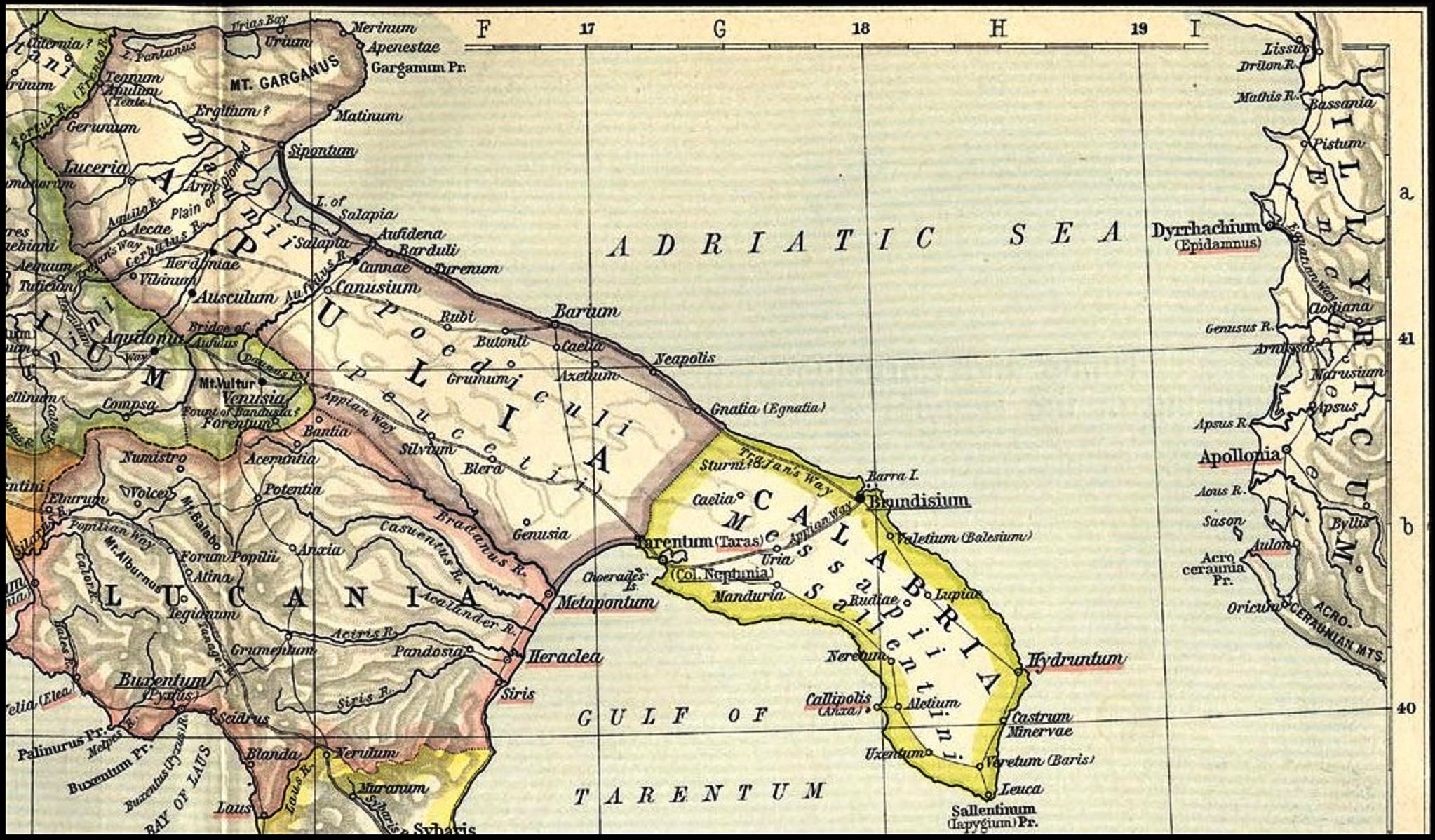
Apulia et Calabria, cropped from "Map of Ancient Italy, Southern Part", by William R. Shepherd, 1911.

The relationship between Messapians and Tarantines deteriorated over time, resulting in a series of clashes between the two peoples from the beginning of the 5th century BC. After two victories of the Tarentines, the Iapygians inflicted a decisive defeat on them, causing the fall of the aristocratic government and the implementation of a democratic one in Taras. It also froze relations between Greeks and the indigenous people for about half a century. Only in the late-5th and 6th centuries did they re-establish relationships. The second great Hellenizing wave occurred during the 4th century BC, this time also involving Daunia and marking the beginning of Peucetian and Daunian epigraphic records, in a local variant of the Hellenistic alphabet that replaced the older Messapic script.

Along with Messapic, Greek and Oscan were spoken and written during the Romanization period all over Apulia, and bilingualism in Greek and Messapic was probably common in southern Apulia at that time. Based upon the legends of the local currencies promoted by Rome, Messapic appears to have been written in the southern zone, Oscan in the northern area, while the central sector was a trilingual area where Messapic, Greek and Oscan co-existed in inscriptions. Messapic epigraphic records seem to have ended by the 2nd century BC. During the 1st century BCE, the language was replaced by Latin, which is the origin of the modern Italian Sallentine dialects of the region.

== Phonology ==
A characteristic feature of Messapic is the absence of the Indo-European phonological opposition between the vowels /u/ and /o/, the language featuring only an o/u phoneme. Consequently, the superfluous letter /u/ (upsilon) was not taken over following the initial period of adaption of the Western ("red") Greek alphabet. The 'o/u' phoneme existed in opposition to an 'a/o' phoneme formed after the phonological distinction between *o and *a was abandoned. The Proto-Indo-European (PIE) vowel /o/ regularly appears as /a/ in inscriptions (e.g., Venas < *Wenos; menza < *mendyo; tabarā < *to-bhorā). The original PIE phonological opposition between ō and o is still perceptible in Messapic. The diphthong *ou, itself reflecting the merged diphthongs *ou and eu, underwent sound change to develop into ao, then into ō (e.g., *Toutor > Taotor > Θōtor).

The dental affricate or spirant written Θ is frequently used before the sounds ao- or o-, where it is most likely a replacement for the older letter. Another special letter,, occurs almost exclusively in Archaic inscriptions from the 6th and 5th centuries BC. Multiple palatalizations have also taken place, as in Zis < *dyēs, Artorres < *Artōryos, or Bla(t)θes < *Blatyos (where '(t)θ' probably denoted a dental affricate or spirant /ts/ or /tš/). Proto-Indo-European *s is generally reflected in Messapic as h in initial and intervocalic positions, evident in forms such as hipa (< *supo-) and klaohi (< *kleu-s-), while final -s is retained, as in Venas (< *Wenos).

The Proto-Indo-European voiced aspirates *bh and *dh are certainly represented by the simple unaspirated voiced obstruents /b/ and /d/ in Messapic (e.g., berain < *bher-; -des < *dʰeh₁). On the other hand, the outcomes of the Indo-European palatal, velar, and labiovelar stops remain unclear, with slender evidence.

== Alphabet ==
The Messapic alphabet is an adaptation of the Western ("red") Greek alphabets, specifically the Laconian-Tarantinian version. The actual Messapic inscriptions are attested from the 6th century BC onward, while the Peucetian and Daunian epigraphic record (written in a local variant of the Hellenistic alphabet rather than in the older Messapic script) only begins in the 4th century BC.

=== Messapic ===
The Greek letter Φ (/pʰ/) was not adopted, because it would have been superfluous for Messapic. While zeta "normally" represented the voiced counterpart to /s/, it may have been an affricate in some cases. The value of Θ is unclear, but is clearly dental; it may be an affricate or a spirant. In any case it appears to have arisen partly as the reflex of the segment *ty.

Messapic	Western Greek	Greek name	Phonetic value
		alpha	/a/
		beta	/b/
		gamma	/g/
		delta	/d/
		epsilon	/e/
		digamma	/v/
		zeta	/z/, /dz/, /dš/
		eta	/h/
		heta	/h/
		theta	/θ/
		iota	/i/
		kappa	/k/
		lambda	/l/
		mu	/m/
		nu	/n/
		xi	/š/
		omicron	/o/, /u/
		pi	/p/
		koppa	/k/ (before /o/)
		rho	/r/
		sigma	/s/
		tau	/t/
		chi	/kʰ/ > -h-, -y- (intervocalic before /i/)
	–	–	/tʰ/ > /θ/
Sources	Marchesini 2009, pp. 144–145; Matzinger 2014, pp. 10–14; De Simone 2017, pp. 1839–1844		
Note	The letters are arranged in chronological order of appearance. Some letterforms went out of use and were replaced by new shapes (see Matzinger 2014, pp. 10–14).		

=== Apulian ===
The script used in northern Apulia was rather peculiar, and some consider it to be a distinct writing system named Apulian. A notable difference between the Apulian alphabet and the Laconian-Tarentinian Messapic alphabet was the use of Η (eta) for /ē/ rather than /h/.

== Inscriptions ==
The Messapic language is a 'fragmentary language' (Trümmersprache), preserved only in about 600 inscriptions from the mid-6th up until the late-2nd century BC. Many of them consist of the personal names of the deceased engraved in burial sites (36% of the total), and only a few inscriptions have been definitely deciphered. Some longer texts are also available, including those recently found in the Grotta della Poesia (Roca Vecchia), although they have not been fully exploited by scholars yet. Most of the Messapic inscriptions are accessible in the Monumenta Linguae Messapicae (MLM), published in print in 2002.

Examples of Messapic inscriptions
Messapic inscription	English translation	Source
Staboos Šonetθihi Dazimaihi beileihi	'of Stabuas Šonetius, son of Dazimas'	
Dazoimihi Balehi Daštas bilihi	'of Dazimas Bales, son of Dazet'	
tabarā Damatras; tabarā Aproditia	'priestess of Damatira'; 'priestess of Aprodita'	
kla(o)hi Zis Venas	'listen, Zis (and) Venas'	
klohi Zis den θavan	'listen, Zis, the public voice'	
θotoria marta pido vastei basta venian aran	'θotoria Marta handed (gave) her field to the city of Basta'	
plastas moldatθehiai bilia etθeta hipades aprod[i]ta	'Etθeta, the daughter of Plazet Moldatθes, dedicated to Aphrodite'	

== Lexicon ==
=== Toponymy/Anthroponymy ===
Messapic	Modern Italian	Balkan correspondences	Sources
Amantia, settlement	Amantea	Amantia, Amantes, Amantini	
(Taotor) Andirabas, god		(Deus) Andinus	
Anxa (Ansha), settlement	-	-	
Apsias, river	-	Apsus	
Apuli, tribal group Teanum Apulum, settlement	Apulia	Apulus, personal name	
Artas, personal name	-	-	
Ausculum, settlement	Ascoli Satriano	-	
Azetium, settlement	near Rutigliano	Azeta, Dardania	
Barium, settlement	Bari	-	
Barzidihi, personal name Barduli, settlement	-	Bardyllis	
Batas/Baton, deity/personal name	-	Bato	
Brendésion/Brentésion, settlement	Brindisi	Brač	
Butuntum, settlement	Bitonto	Butua	
Calabri, tribal group	Calabria	Galabri	
Caelia, settlement	Ceglie del Campo	Čelje	
Canusium, settlement	Canosa di Puglia	-	
Dazas/Dazimas/ (Latin or ancient Greek forms: Dazos/Dazimos/Dasio/Dassius), personal name	-	Dasius/Dassius, personal name	
Dardanos, settlement; Derdensis, region; Dardi, tribal group	-	Dardani	
Genusium/ager Genusinus, settlement/district	Ginosa	Genusus (modern Shkumbin)	
Gnatia, settlement	-	-	
Graiva	-	-	
Herdonia, settlement	Ordona	-	
Hydruntum, settlement	Otranto	-	
Ladi-, personal name component	-	Scerdilaidas	
Manduria, toponym	-	Mezēnai, Mëz, Mâz	
Peucetii	-	Peucetioe, Liburnia	
Rudiae, settlement	-	-	
Salapia, settlement Salapitani, tribal group	-	Selepitani	
Taotor, deity	-	Teuta, Triteuta, Teutana	
Thana, deity	-	Thana	
Dauni, tribal group	-	Thunatai	
Uria, settlement	Vereto	-	
Uxentum, settlement	Ugento/Ušèntu	-	

=== Inherited ===
Only Messapic words regarded as 'inherited' from its precursor are hereunder listed, thus excluding loanwords from Greek, Latin or other languages.

Messapic lexical item	English translation	Proto-Messapic form	Albanoid (Illyric)	Paleo-Balkan	Other Indo-European cognates	Sources
ana	mother	*annā (a nursery word)	Proto-Albanian: *na(n)nā, *amma; Albanian: nënë/nana, ëmë/âmë ('mother')	Greek: ámma ('mother, nurse')	Hittite: annaš ('mother'); Latin: amma ('mother');	
anda	and, as well		Proto-Abanian: *edhō/êndō; Albanian: edhe/ênde ('and', 'yet', 'therefore')	Greek: endha/ΕΝΘΑ; ('and', 'as well')	Latin: ante ("opposite, in front of"); Hittite: anda	
apa	from	*apo	Proto-Albanian: *apo; Albanian: (për-)apë ('from'); Albanian (Gheg): pi (PI < apa) ('from') or pa (PA < *apa) ('without')	Greek: apó	Sanskrit: ápa	
atabulus	sirocco		Proto-Albanian: *abula; Albanian: avull ('steam, vapor')		Proto-Germanic: *nebulaz ('fog')	
aran	field	*h₂r°h₃ā-	Proto-Albanian: *arā: Albanian: arë, ara ('field')	Ancient Greek arura ('earth')	Hittite: arba- ('border, area'); Latvian: ara ('field')	
bàrka	belly		Proto-Albanian: *baruka; Albanian: bark ('belly')			
Barzidihi, Barduli	(personal name)		Illyrian: Bardyl(l)is; Proto-Albanian: *bardza; Albanian: bardhë/bardhi, Bardha ('white', found also in anthroponyms, e.g., Bardh-i, Bardhyl)			
bennan	(a sort of vehicle)	*benna			Gaulish: benna (a kind of 'carriage')	
biles/bilihi	son		Proto-Albanian: *bira; Albanian: bir, pl. bilj – bij ('son')		Latin: fīlius ('son')	
biliā/bilina	daughter	*bhu-lyā	Proto-Albanian: *birilā; Albanian: bijë – bija ('daughter'); older dialect bilë – bila ('daughter')		Latin: fīlia ('daughter')	
bréndon; bréntion	stag; stag's head. The Messapic word is at the origin of the toponym Brendésion (Βρενδέσιον), Brentḗsion (Βρεντήσιον), modern Brindisi		Proto-Albanian: *brina; Albanian: bri, brî ('horn'; 'antler')		Lithuanian: briedis, ('elk'); (Note: In a 2022 publication, Tijmen Pronk argues that Lith. briedis, Latv. briêdis, and Old Prussian braydis (all meaning 'elk') are loanwords from a non-IE language.) Swedish: brinde ('elk')	
Damatura	Mother Earth (goddess)	*dʰǵʰ(e)m- matura	Pre-Proto-Albanian: *d^{ź}ō > Proto-Albanian ðē(h) > Albanian: dhe ('earth')	Whether the (pre-)Illyrian form is at the origin of the Greek goddess Demeter or the contrary is unclear.	Latvian: Zemes Māte ('Mother Earth')	
deiva; dīva	god; goddess				Sanskrit: devá ('heavenly, divine'); Lithuanian Diēvas; Old Norse: Týr	
den	voice	*ghen	Proto-Albanian: *džana; Albanian: zë/zâ, zër/zân ('voice')			
fli	sleep		Albanian: flê, fli			
hazavaθi	to offer (sacral)			ha- is a prefix, zav- is the same root as in Greek: χεών	same root in Sanskrit ju-hô-ti and Avestan: zaotar- ('sacrificer')	
hipades	he/she/it offers, dedicates, sets up	*supo dhē-s-t	Proto-Albanian: *skūpa: Albanian: hip ('go up') and dha/dhash ('he gave/I gave')			
hipakaθi	offer, set up		Albanian: hip ('go up') and ka/kam ('he has/I have') > hip-ka-			
kàrpa	'tuff (rock), limestone', preserved as càrpë 'tuff' in Bitonto dialect and càrparu 'limestone' in Salentino		Albanian: kárpë/kárpa, pl. kárpa/-t ('rock, stiff')	root of the oronym Karpates (Carpathian Mountains)	Lithuanian kerpù, kir̃pti 'chop, cut'	
klaohi/klohi	hear, listen (invocative)	*kleu-s-	Albanian: kluoj/kluaj/kluhem ('call, hear')	Greek: klythí ('hear')	Sanskrit: śrudhí ('hear'); Slavic: slušati ('hear'); Lithuanian: klausyti ('hear')	
kos	someone	*q^{w}o	Proto-Albanian: *kuša; Albanian: kush ('who')		Tocharian A: Kus ('who')	
ma	not	*meh₁	Albanian: ma, me, mos	Greek: mē	Sanskrit: mā	
menza, Manduria (toponym)	foal	*mendyo	Proto-Albanian: *mandja; Albanian: mëz – maz ('foal') (also root of mazrek 'horse breeder'), mend ('to suckle'); Romanian: mînz ('foal')	Thracian: mezēnai 'horseman'	Gaulish: mandus ('foal')	
ner	man	*ner-	Proto-Albanian: *nera; Albanian: njeri ('man')	Greek: ανηρ ('man')	Sanskrit: nar- ('man')	
penkaheh	five		Proto-Albanian: *pentše; Albanian: pesë ('five')		Lithuanian: penki ('five')	
pi-	on, thereon		MM Gheg Albanian pi, Tosk Albanian mbi ('over, above')	Greek πι	Sanskrit pi-	
rhīnós	fog, mist, cloud		Proto-Albanian: *rina: Albanian: re, rê, rên ('cloud')			
tabarā; tabaras	priestess; priest (lit. 'offerer')	*to-bhorā; *to-bhoros	Albanian: të bie/të bar, bjer/bar ('bring', 'carry')	Greek: φορός ('bring')	Latin: ferō ('bring')	
teutā Taotor	community, people (name of a god)	*Toutor	Illyrian: Teuta(na) ('mistress of the people', 'queen')		Oscan: touto ('community'); Old Irish: túath ('tribe, people'); Lithuanian: tautà ('people'); Gothic þiuda 'folk'	
veinan	his; one's		Albanian: vetë ('himself, oneself')		Sanskrit: svayàm ('himself')	
Vèrnula	toponym (a village near Lecce), from a root meaning 'alder'		Albanoid *u̯irnā: Albanian verrë ('alder')			
Venas	desire (name of a goddess)	*wenos			Latin: Venus; Old Indic: vánas ('desire')	
Zis	sky-god	*dyēs	Albanian Zojz ('sky-god')	Greek Zeus; Tymphaean: Deipaturos ('daylight-sky-father'), considered a loanword from Illyrian	Hittite: šīuš ('god'); Sanskrit: Dyáuṣ; Latin: Jupiter ('sky-god')	

== Language contact ==
=== Italic ===
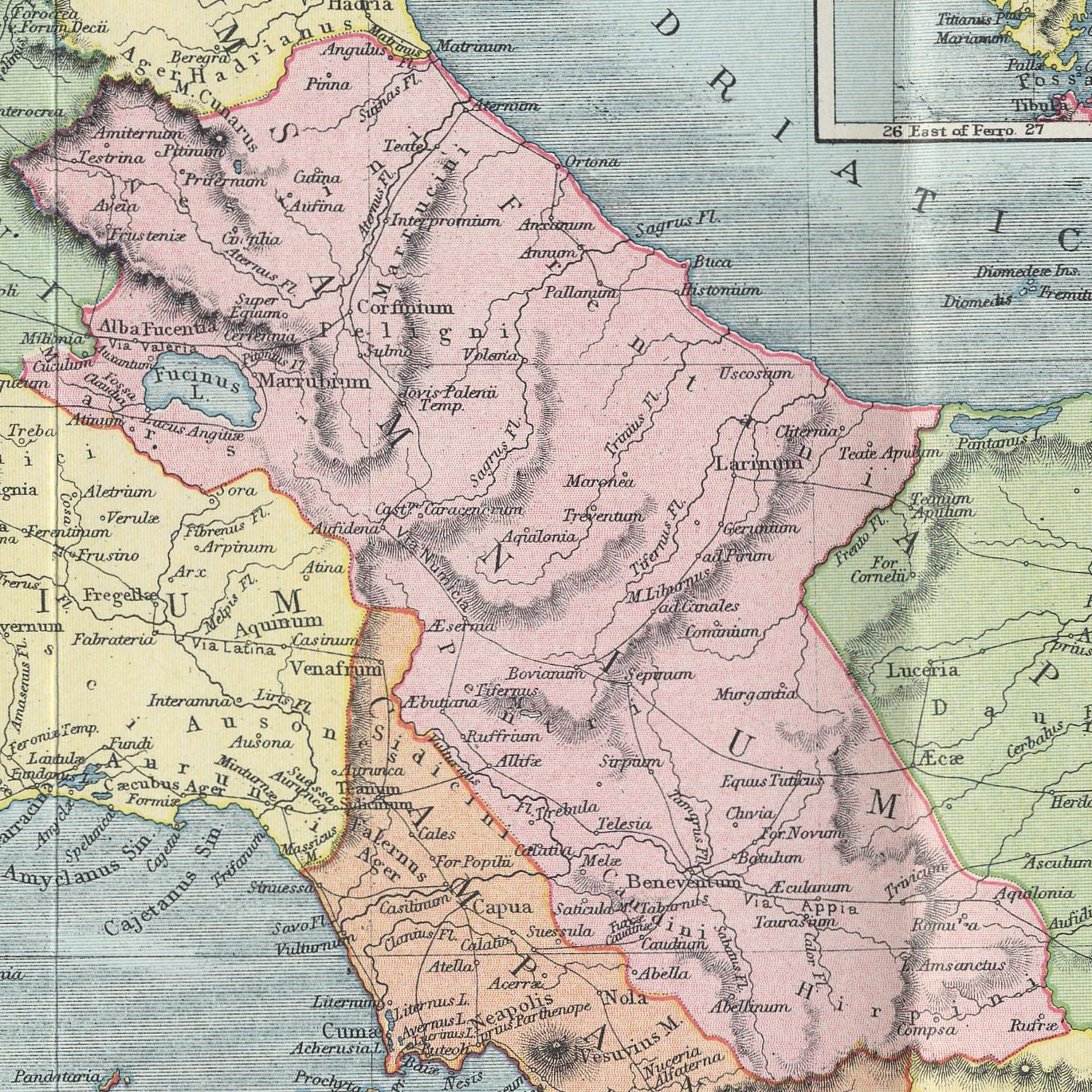
Southern Samnium and northern Apulia were major regions of Iapygian-Italic linguistic contact

Messapic was in continuous contact with the Italic languages of the region. Prior to the Roman annexation, the frontier between Messapic and Oscan extended across Frentania-Irpinia-Lucania-Apulia. In this broad transitional zone, processes of Oscanization and Samnitization took place, producing communities with dual ethnic or linguistic identities. Contemporary sources reflect this situation: Larinum, for instance, has yielded extensive Oscan onomastic material yet is nevertheless described as a "Daunian city", and Horace—born in Venusia, on the boundary between Daunian and Lucanian territories—famously referred to himself as "Lucanian or Apulian".

A limited corpus of Messapic lexical items passed into Latin. These include baltea (from balta, 'swamp'), deda ('nurse'), gandeia ('sword'), horeia ('small fishing boat'), and mannus ('pony, small horse', from manda). Messapic also appears to have served as an intermediary channel for the transmission of several, mostly archaic, Greek words into Latin. For example, paro ('small ship') is derived via Messapic from Greek paroon. The Latin form Ulixes may likewise represent a Messapic variant of Odysseus, parallel to the ethnonym Graeci, which may reflect an Illyrian term for the Greek populations of Epirus. A Messapic intermediary has also been proposed for Latin lancea ('spear') and balaena (ultimately from Greek phallaina). In literary sources, Horace and Ennius—both natives of the region—are the only Roman authors to preserve the non-Italic word laama ('swamp'), which is plausibly of Messapic origin.

=== Ancient Greek ===
The Messapic verbal form eipeigrave ('wrote, incised'; variant ipigrave) is a clear loanword from Greek (with the initial stem eipigra-, ipigra- deriving from epigrá-phō, ἐπιγράφω, 'inscribe, engrave'). Its adoption likely reflects the borrowing of the Messapic alphabet from an Archaic Greek script. Other Greek loanwords include argora-pandes ('coin officials', with the first part deriving from ἄργυρος), and names of deities like Athana and possibly Aprodita. The latter may alternatively represent a native Messapic theonym of an Indo-European goddess, corresponding to Proto-Albanian *apro dītā ('come forth brightness of the day/dawn'), preserved in the Albanian phrase afro dita ('come forth the day/dawn'), referring to the planet Venus, and associated with the dawn goddess Prende.

The origin of the Messapic goddess Damatura/Damatira is debated: scholars like Vladimir I. Georgiev (1937), Eqrem Çabej, Shaban Demiraj (1997), Martin L. West (2007) and Simona Marchesini (2021) have argued that she was an Illyrian or Messapic goddess eventually borrowed into Greek as Demeter, while others like Paul Kretschmer (1939), Robert S. P. Beekes (2009) and Carlo De Simone (2017) have argued for the contrary.

== See also ==
- List of ancient peoples of Italy

== Sources ==
=== Bibliography ===
- Adams, James N. (2003). Bilingualism and the Latin Language. Cambridge University Press. ISBN 978-0-521-81771-4.
- Aigner-Foresti, Luciana (2004). "Gli Illiri in Italia:istituzioni politiche nella Messapia preromana". In Gianpaolo Urso (ed.). Dall'Adriatico al Danubio: l'Illirico nell'età greca e romana: atti del convegno internazionale, Cividale del Friuli, 25–27 settembre 2003. I convegni della Fondazione Niccolò Canussio. ETS. pp. 79–94. ISBN 884671069X.
- Baliu, Begzad (2012). Onomastikë dhe identitet [Onomastics and Identity] (PDF) (in Albanian). Era. ISBN 978-9951-04-071-6.
- Beekes, Robert S. P. (2009). Etymological Dictionary of Greek. Brill. ISBN 978-90-04-32186-1.
- Bejko, Lorenc, ed. (2004). Die Illyrer: Katalog zu einer Ausstellung von archäologischen Funden der albanischen Eisenzeit (12.–4. Jh. v. Chr.) aus den Sammlungen des Archäologischen Institutes der Albanischen Akademie der Wissenschaften in Tirana und des Archäologischen Museums in Durres, Albanien; Sonderausstellung im Museum für Urgeschichte des Landes Niederösterreich, Asparn an der Zaya, vom 3. April bis 30. November 2004. Amt der Niederösterreichischen Landesregierung, Abteilung Kultur und Wissenschaft. ISBN 9783854602156.
- Boardman, John; Sollberger, E. (1982). J. Boardman; I. E. S. Edwards; N. G. L. Hammond; E. Sollberger (eds.). The Cambridge Ancient History: The Prehistory of the Balkans; and the Middle East and the Aegean world, tenth to eighth centuries B.C. Vol. III (part 1) (2 ed.). Cambridge University Press. ISBN 0521224969.
- Buda, Aleks (1984). Problems of the formation of the Albanian people, their language and culture: conference (selection). The "8 Nëntori" Pub. House.
- Buqinca, Arianit (2021). Recherche sur les Dardaniens: VIe- Ier siècles av. J.- C. (Thesis). Université de Lyon.
- Cortelazzo, Manlio; Marcato, Carla (1998). "càrpë". In Manlio Cortelazzo (ed.). I dialetti italiani: dizionario etimologico, Volume 1. UTET. p. 120. ISBN 9788802052113.
- Dedvukaj, Lindon (2023a). "Linguistic evidence for the Indo-European and Albanian origin of Aphrodite". Proceedings of the Linguistic Society of America. 8 (1). Linguistic Society of America: 5500. doi:10.3765/plsa.v8i1.5500. S2CID 258381736.
- Dedvukaj, Lindon (2023b). "Reanalyzing the Historical Constructions of Albanian Prepositions". ICHL26: International Conference on Historical Linguistics, Universität Heidelberg, 4–8 Sept. 2023 : Book of Abstracts. Universität Heidelberg. pp. 274–275.
- Delamarre, Xavier (2003). Dictionnaire de la langue gauloise: Une approche linguistique du vieux-celtique continental (in French). Errance. ISBN 9782877723695.
- Demiraj, Bardhyl (1997). Albanische Etymologien: Untersuchungen zum albanischen Erbwortschatz. Leiden Studies in Indo-European (in German). Vol. 7. Amsterdam, Atlanta: Rodopi.
- Demiraj, Shaban (2004). "Gjendja gjuhësore e Gadishullit Ballkanik në lashtësi" [The linguistic situation of the Balkan Peninsula in antiquity]. Gjuhësi Ballkanike [Balkan Linguistics] (in Albanian). Academy of Sciences of Albania. ISBN 9789994363001.
- De Simone, Carlo (1988). "Inscrizione messapiche della grotta della poesia (Melendugno, Lecce)". Annali della Scuola Normale Superiore di Pisa. Classe di Lettere e Filosofia. 18 (2): 325–415. ISSN 0392-095X. JSTOR 24307508.
- de Simone, Carlo (2016), "Messapic language", Oxford Research Encyclopedia of Classics, Oxford University Press, doi:10.1093/acrefore/9780199381135.013.4139, ISBN 978-0-19-938113-5
- De Simone, Carlo (2017). "Messapic". In Klein, Jared; Joseph, Brian; Fritz, Matthias (eds.). Handbook of Comparative and Historical Indo-European Linguistics. Vol. 3. Walter de Gruyter. ISBN 978-3-11-054243-1.
- de Vaan, Michiel (2017). "The phonology of Albanian". In Klein, Jared; Joseph, Brian; Fritz, Matthias (eds.). Handbook of Comparative and Historical Indo-European Linguistics. Vol. 3. Walter de Gruyter. ISBN 978-3-11-054243-1.
- de Vaan, Michiel (2018). Etymological Dictionary of Latin and the other Italic Languages. Indo-European Etymological dictionary series. Vol. 7. Boston: Leiden. ISBN 9789004167971. ISSN 1574-3586.
- Dzino, Danijel (2014). "'Illyrians' in ancient ethnographic discourse". Dialogues d'Histoire Ancienne. 40 (2): 45–65. doi:10.3917/dha.402.0045.
- Fisher, Jay (2014). The Annals of Quintus Ennius and the Italic Tradition. JHU Press. ISBN 9781421411293.
- Fortson, Benjamin W. (2004). Indo-European Language and Culture. Blackwell Publishing. ISBN 1-4051-0316-7.
- Friedman, Victor A. (2011). "The Balkan Languages and Balkan Linguistics". Annual Review of Anthropology. 40: 275–291. doi:10.1146/annurev-anthro-081309-145932.
- Friedman, Victor A. (2020). "The Balkans". In Evangelia Adamou, Yaron Matras (ed.). The Routledge Handbook of Language Contact. Routledge Handbooks in Linguistics. Routledge. pp. 385–403. ISBN 9781351109147.
- Friedman, Victor A.; Joseph, Brian D. (2025). The Balkan Languages. Cambridge University Press. doi:10.1017/9781139019095. ISBN 9781139019095.
- Graham, A. J. (1982). "The Colonial Expansion of Greece". In John Boardman; N. G. L. Hammond (eds.). The Cambridge Ancient History: The Expansion of the Greek World, Eighth to Sixth Centuries B.C. Vol. III (part 3) (2 ed.). Cambridge University Press. ISBN 0521234476.
- Hamp, Eric P. (1966). "The Position of Albanian". In Birnbaum, Henrik; Puhvel, Jaan (eds.). Ancient Indo-European Dialects: Proceedings of the Conference on Indo-European Linguistics Held at the University of California, Los Angeles, April 25–27, 1963. University of California Press. ISBN 978-0520001206.
- Hamp, Eric P. (1996). "Varia". Études Celtiques. 32: 87–90. doi:10.3406/ecelt.1996.2087. ISSN 0373-1928.
- Hamp, Eric; Adams, Douglas (2013). "The Expansion of the Indo-European Languages: An Indo-Europeanist's Evolving View" (PDF). Sino-Platonic Papers. 239.
- Hyllested, Adam; Joseph, Brian D. (2022). "Albanian". The Indo-European Language Family. Cambridge University Press. ISBN 9781108499798.
- Ismajli, Rexhep (2013). "Diskutime për prejardhjen e gjuhës shqipe" [Discussions About the Origin of the Albanian Language]. In Bardh Rugova (ed.). Seminari XXXII Ndërkombëtar për Gjuhën, Letërsinë dhe Kulturën Shqiptare [The XXXII International Seminar on Albanian Language, Literature and Culture] (in Albanian). Prishtinë: University of Prishtina.
- Ismajli, Rexhep (2015). Eqrem Basha (ed.). Studime për historinë e shqipes në kontekst ballkanik [Studies on the History of Albanian in the Balkan context] (in Albanian). Prishtinë: Kosova Academy of Sciences and Arts, special editions CLII, Section of Linguistics and Literature.
- Krahe, Hans (1946). "Die illyrische Naniengebung (Die Götternamen)" (PDF). Jarhbücher f. d. Altertumswiss (in German). pp. 199–204. S2CID 54995190. Archived from the original (PDF) on 2019-03-07.
- Katičić, Radoslav (1995). Illyricum mythologicum (in Croatian). Zagreb: Antibarbarus. ISBN 9789536160327.
- Lamboley, Jean-Luc (1996). Recherches sur les Messapiens, IVe-IIe siècle avant J.-C. Bibliothèque des Écoles françaises d'Athènes et de Rome. ISBN 2728303606.
- Majer, Marek (2019). "Parahistoria indoevropiane e fjalës shqipe për 'motrën'" [Indo-European Prehistory of the Albanian Word for 'Sister']. Seminari Ndërkombëtar për Gjuhën, Letërsinë dhe Kulturën Shqiptare [International Seminar for Albanian Language, Literature and Culture] (in Albanian). 1 (38). University of Prishtina: 252–266. ISSN 2521-3687.
- Mallory, James P.; Adams, Douglas Q. (1997), Encyclopedia of Indo-European Culture, London: Routledge, ISBN 978-1-884964-98-5
- Mann, Stuart E. (1952). "The Indo-European Consonants in Albanian". Language. 28 (1). Linguistic Society of America: 31–40. doi:10.2307/409988. JSTOR 409988.
- Mann, Stuart E. (1977). An Albanian Historical Grammar. Buske. ISBN 978-3-87118-262-4.
- Marchesini, Simona (2009). Le lingue frammentarie dell'Italia antica: manuale per lo studio delle lingue preromane (in Italian). U. Hoepli. ISBN 978-88-203-4166-4.
- Marchesini, Simona (2020). "Messapico". Palaeohispanica: Revista sobre lenguas y culturas de la Hispania antigua (in Italian) (20): 495–530. doi:10.36707/palaeohispanica.v0i20.378. S2CID 243412082.
- Marchesini, Simona (2021). "I Messapi nel Mediterraneo" [The Messapians in the Mediterranean]. Storia dei Mediterranei: Relazioni linguistiche, viaggi, politiche di dominio, conflitti. Annale 3. Mediterraneo e storia. Vol. 35. Edizioni di storia e studi sociali. pp. 10–42. ISBN 9788899168544.
- Marchesini, Simona (2023a). "Ancient Pilgrimage and Inscriptions. Examples from Pre-Roman Rock-Inscriptions of Italy". Mythos Rivista di Storia delle Religioni. 17. Salvatore Sciascia Editore. ISSN 2037-7746.
- Matasović, Ranko (1995). "Skokove 'ilirske' etimologije". Folia onomastica Croatica (in Croatian) (4): 89–101.
- Matasović, Ranko (2012). A Grammatical Sketch of Albanian for Students of Indo-European (PDF) (Report). University of Zagreb.
- Matzinger, Joachim (2005). "Messapisch und Albanisch". International Journal of Diachronic Linguistics and Linguistic Reconstruction (in German) (2): 29–54.
- Matzinger, Joachim (2014), Einführung ins Messapische (in German), Vienna
- Matzinger, Joachim (2015). "Messapico e illirico". Idomeneo. 19. University of Salento: 57–66. doi:10.1285/i20380313v19p57. ISSN 2038-0313.
- Matzinger, Joachim (2017). "The Lexicon of Albanian". In Klein, Jared; Joseph, Brian; Fritz, Matthias (eds.). Handbook of Comparative and Historical Indo-European Linguistics. Vol. 3. Walter de Gruyter. ISBN 978-3-11-054243-1.
- Matzinger, Joachim (2019). Messapisch. Kurzgrammatiken indogermanischer Sprachen und Sprachstufen (in German). Vol. 2. Dr Ludwig Reichert Verlag. ISBN 978-3954903986.
- Matzinger, Joachim (2021). "Ancient Languages of the Balkans". In Götz Keydana; Wolfgang Hock; Paul Widmer (eds.). Comparison and Gradation in Indo-European. Walter de Gruyter GmbH & Co KG. ISBN 9783110637434.
- Matzinger, Joachim (2025). "Tria corda, oder die Sprachlandschaft des antiken Apuliens". In Emmanuel Dupraz; Antoine Viredaz (eds.). Langues Et Institutions en Italie Méridionale: Les Aires Osques Et Messapiennes Entre Grande-Grèce Et Rome. Schwabe Verlagsgruppe AG Schwabe Verlag. pp. 91–106. doi:10.24894/978-3-7965-5186-4. ISBN 978-3-7965-5186-4.
- Mërkuri, Nexhip (2015). "Gjuhësia e përgjithshme dhe këndvështrimet bashkëkohore për Epirin dhe mesapët" [General Linguistics and Contemporary Perspectives on Epirus and the Messapians]. In Ibrahimi, Zeqirija (ed.). Shaban Demiraj – figurë e shquar e albanologjisë dhe ballkanologjisë [Shaban Demiraj – prominent figure of Albanianology and Balkanology] (in Albanian). Instituti i Trashëgimisë Shpirtërore e Kulturore të Shqiptarëve – Shkup. p. 57. ISBN 9786084653240.
- Orel, Vladimir E. (1998). Albanian Etymological Dictionary. Brill. ISBN 978-90-04-11024-3.
- Pisani, Vittore (1976). "Gli Illiri in Italia". Iliria (in Italian). 5: 67–73. doi:10.3406/iliri.1976.1213.
- Palmer, Leonard Robert (1988). The Latin Language. University of Oklahoma Press. ISBN 080612136X.
- Pisani, Vittore (1987). Linguistica e filologia: atti del VII Convegno internazionale di linguisti tenuto a Milano nei giorni 12–14 settembre 1984. Paideia. ISBN 8839403922.
- Poli, Diego (2019). "Quale significato per il significante ri? Alla ricerca della 'regalità' in Irlanda". In Fiori, Roberto (ed.). Re e popolo: Istituzioni arcaiche tra storia e comparazione. V&R Unipress. pp. 527–602. ISBN 9783847010227.
- Rusakov, Alexander (2017). "Albanian". In Kapović, Mate; Giacalone Ramat, Anna; Ramat, Paolo (eds.). The Indo-European Languages. Routledge. pp. 552–602. ISBN 9781317391531.
- Salvemini, Biagio; Massafra, Angelo, eds. (2005). Storia della Puglia. Dalle origini al Seicento (in Italian). Vol. 1. Laterza. ISBN 8842077992.
- Savić, Danilo; Ligorio, Orsat (2022). "Illyrian and Slavic". Lucida Intervalla. 51. Beograd: Filozofski fakultet Univerziteta u Beogradu: 3–41. ISSN 1450-6645.
- Small, Alastair (2014). "Pots, Peoples and Places in Fourth-Century B.C.E. Apulia". In Carpenter, T. H.; Lynch, K. M.; Robinson, E. G. D. (eds.). The Italic People of Ancient Apulia: New Evidence from Pottery for Workshops, Markets, and Customs. Cambridge University Press. ISBN 978-1-139-99270-1.
- Søborg, Tobias Mosbæk (2020). Sigmatic Verbal Formations in Anatolian and Indo-European: A Cladistic Study (Thesis). University of Copenhagen, Department of Nordic Studies and Linguistics.
- Torelli, Mario (1995). Studies in the Romanization of Italy. University of Alberta. ISBN 0888642415.
- Trask, Robert Lawrence (2019) [2000]. The Dictionary of Historical and Comparative Linguistics. Edinburgh University Press. ISBN 9781474473316.
- Trumper, John (2018). "Some Celto-Albanian isoglosses and their implications". In Grimaldi, Mirko; Lai, Rosangela; Franco, Ludovico; Baldi, Benedetta (eds.). Structuring Variation in Romance Linguistics and Beyond: In Honour of Leonardo M. Savoia. John Benjamins Publishing Company. ISBN 9789027263179.
- van Driem, George (2022). Languages of the Himalayas. Vol. 2. BRILL. ISBN 978-90-04-51492-8.
- West, Martin L. (2007). Indo-European Poetry and Myth. Oxford University Press. ISBN 978-0199280759.
- Wilkes, J. J. (1992). The Illyrians. Oxford, United Kingdom: Blackwell Publishing. ISBN 0-631-19807-5.
- Woodard, Roger D. (2008). The Ancient Languages of Europe. Cambridge University Press. ISBN 978-1-139-46932-6.
- Yntema, Douwe (2017). "The Pre-Roman Peoples of Apulia (1000-100 BC)". In Gary D. Farney, Guy Bradley (ed.). The Peoples of Ancient Italy. De Gruyter Reference. Walter de Gruyter GmbH & Co KG. pp. 337–. ISBN 9781614513001.
