= Iapyx =

Favorite of Apollo in Greek mythology

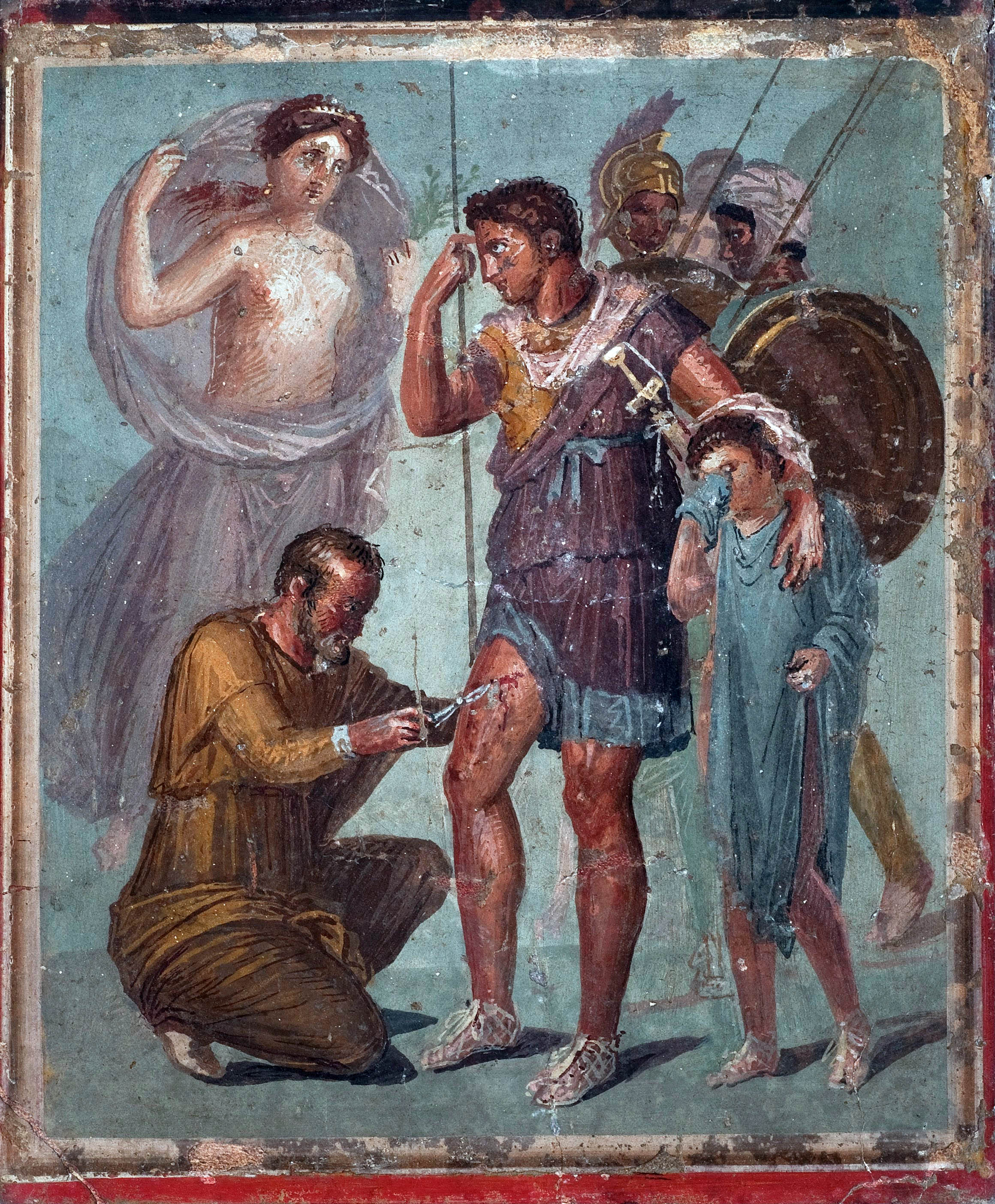
Iapyx removing an arrowhead from the leg of Aeneas, with Aeneas's son, Ascanius (or Iulus), crying beside him.

In Greek and Roman mythology, Iapyx (from Greek Ἰάπυξ, gen.: Ἰάπυγος), Iapux or Iapis was a favorite of Apollo. The god offered to confer upon him the gift of prophecy, the lyre, etc.; but Iapyx, wishing to prolong the life of his father, preferred the more tranquil art of healing to all the others.

Virgil's Aeneid (XII: 391–402) relates that Iapyx was Aeneas's healer during the Trojan War and then escaped to Italy after the war, founding Apulia.

== Family ==
His descent is unclear. He was either:

- a son of Iasus, or
- the son of Lycaon, which would make him the brother of Daunius and Peucetius (who went as leaders of a colony to Italy), or
- a Cretan, from whom the Cretans who migrated to Italy derived the name of Iapyges, or
- a son of Daedalus either:
  - by his wife, thus making him a full-brother of Icarus;
  - by another Cretan woman.

== Other use ==
Iapyx is also the name of a minor Greek wind god, the north-west or west-north-west wind. Virgil relates this Iapyx to the wind that carried the fleeing Cleopatra home to Egypt after her loss at the battle of Actium. Horace prays that Iapyx may safely carry his friend Virgil's ship to Greece.

According to Strabo, the Iapygians were named after Iapyx.
