= Iapygians =

Indo-European-speaking people of pre-Roman Apulia

Latin: Iapyges Ancient Greek: Ἰάπυγες, Iápyges
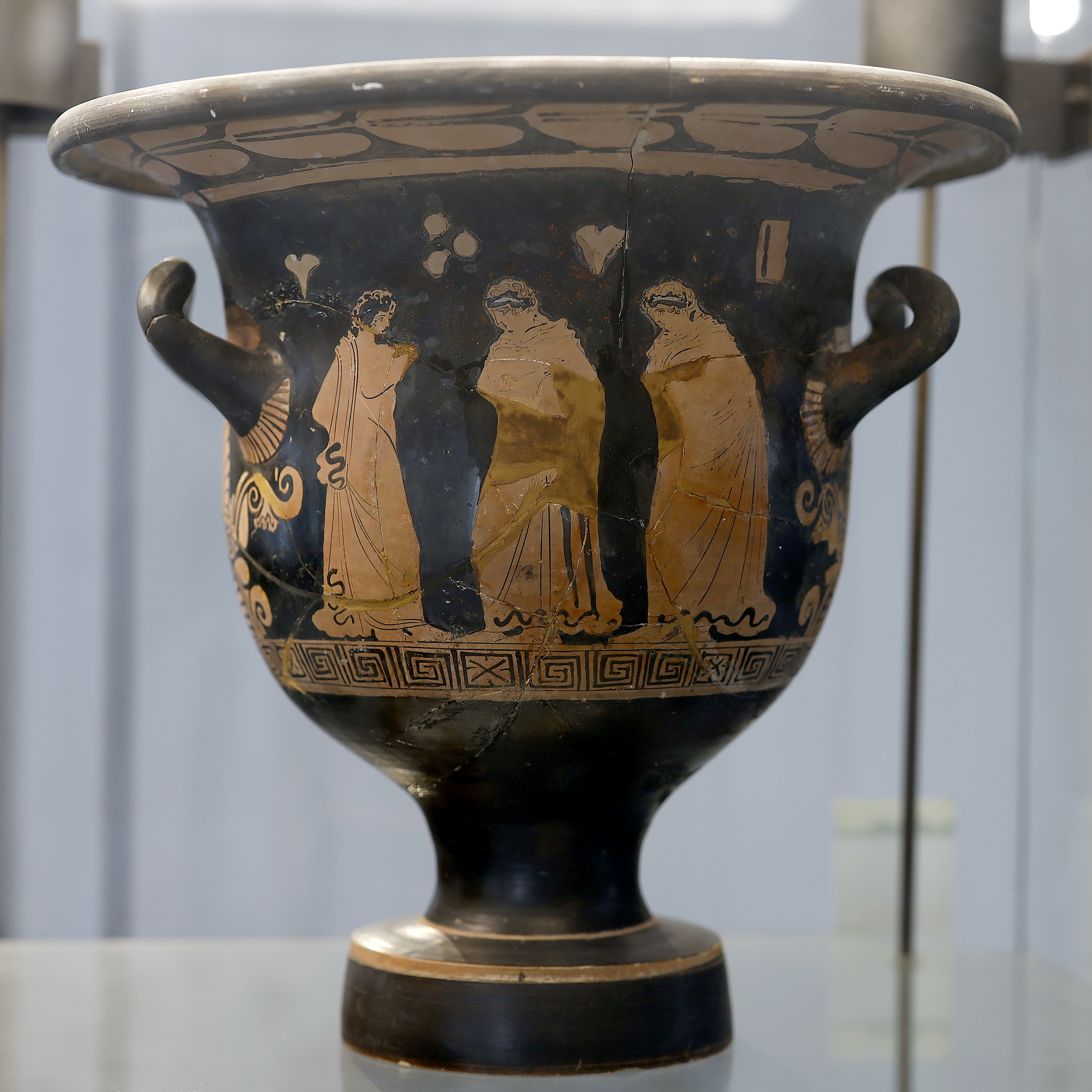
- 4th-century BC Messapian bell-krater from Roca, showing three cloaked figures

Languages
- Messapic; Greek; Oscan; Latin

Religion
- Illyrian religion; Ancient Greek religion

Related ethnic groups
- Daunians, Peucetians and Messapians

The Iapygians or Apulians (Latin: Iapyges, Iapygii) were an Indo-European-speaking people who inhabited Iapygia in southeastern Italy (modern Apulia), from the early first millennium BC until the first century BC. They were traditionally divided into three tribal groups: the Daunians, Peucetians and Messapians.

Their culture developed following cross-Adriatic migrations of Balkan populations in the early first millennium BC, whose traditions blended with local Apulian communities to form a distinct regional identity. The Iapygians spoke Messapic, a Paleo-Balkan language written in Greek-derived alphabets. Their culture, distinct in dress, religion, and burial customs, underwent significant Hellenizing influences from the 6th century BC onward, largely through contacts with nearby Greek colonies such as Taras.

Initially organised in dispersed rural settlements, Iapygian communities gradually evolved into fortified centres and emerging city-states by the 4th century BC. From the late 4th century BC, the region was progressively subjugated and colonised by Rome, and by the early 1st century BC the Iapygians were fully Latinised and assimilated into Roman culture.

== Name ==
The region was known to the Greeks of the 5th century BC as Iapygía (Ἰαπυγία), and its inhabitants as the Iápyges (Ἰάπυγες). It was probably the term used by the indigenous peoples to designate themselves. The name Iapyges has also been compared to that of the Iapydes, an Illyrian tribe of northern Dalmatia.

Some ancient sources treat Iapygians and Messapians as synonymous, and several writers of the Roman period referred to them as Apuli in the north, Poediculi in the centre, and Sallentini or Calabri in the south. By the middle of the 3rd century, Iapygians were generally divided by contemporary observers among three peoples: the Daunians in the north, the Peucetians in the centre, and the Messapians in the south. This tripartite cultural division is supported by archaeological findings, such as variations in ceramics, settlement patterns, and funerary practices. Discrepancies in the names given by Greek and Roman observers may indicate that the sub-ethnic Iapygian structures were unstable and sometimes fragmented.

In the southern part of Apulia, the natives themselves divided the region into two parts: one around the Iapygian Cape inhabited by the Salentinoi and another by the Kalabroi. For central and northern Apulia, Strabo notes that while Greek sources refer to groups such as the Peuketioi (also called Poidikloi) and Daunioi, the natives collectively called the area Apulia.

The name Apulia itself may derive from Iapygia after passing from Greek to Oscan to Latin and undergoing subsequent morphological shifts.

== Geography ==
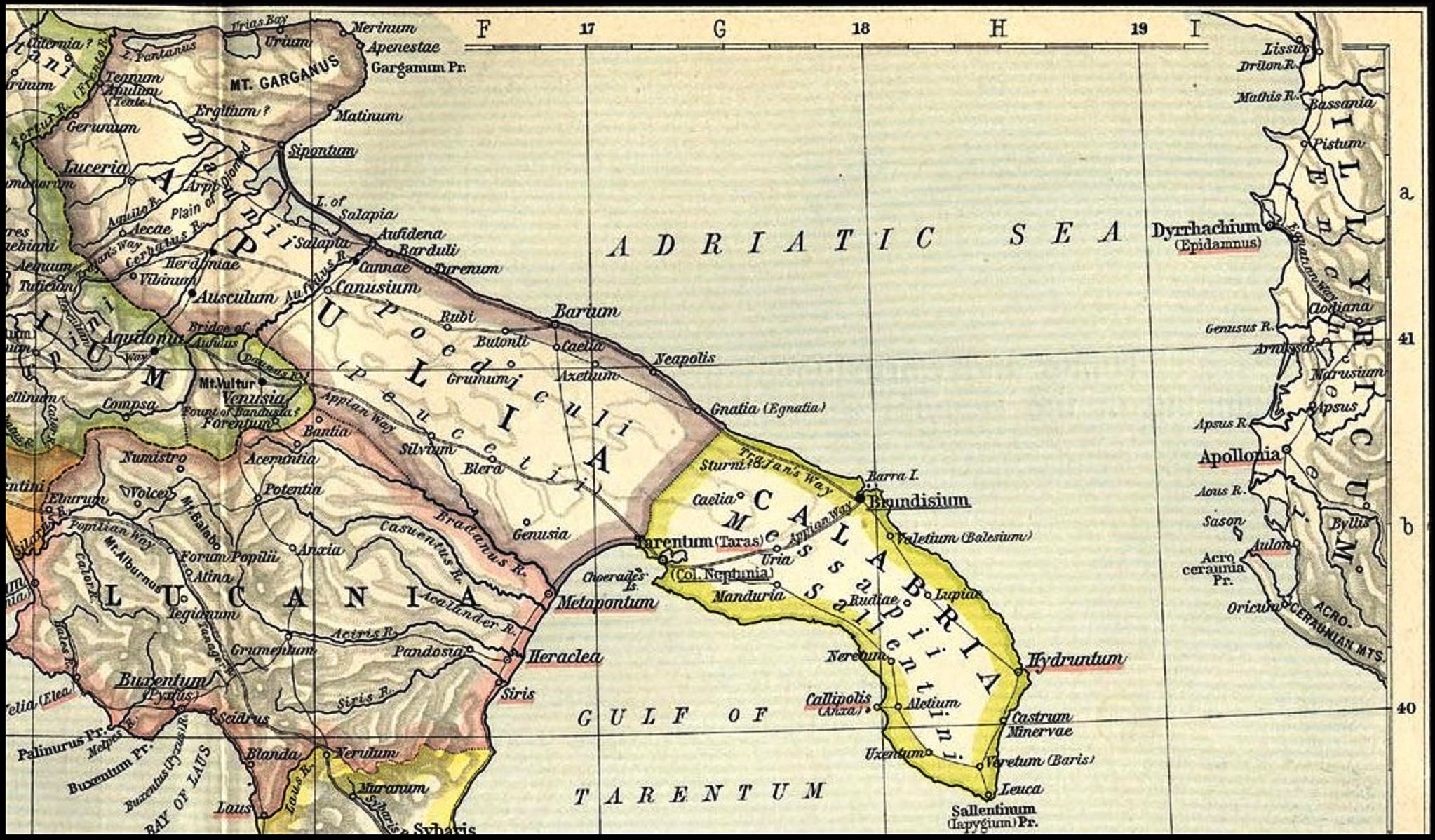
Apulia and Calabria, cropped from "Map of Ancient Italy, Southern Part", by William R. Shepherd, 1911.

Iapygia (modern-day Apulia) was located in the southeastern part of the Italian Peninsula, between the Apennine Mountains and the Adriatic Sea.

The northeast area of the region, dominated by the massif of Monte Gargano (1,055 m), was largely unsuited for agriculture and abandoned to forests. To the south and west of the Gargano stretched the largest plain of peninsular Italy, the Tavoliere delle Puglie. Although it mainly consists of sands and gravels, the plain is also crossed by several rivers. In ancient times, the land was best suited for cereal cultivation and, above all, for the pasturage of sheep in the winter. The Ofanto river, one of the longest rivers of the Italian Peninsula, marked the southern border of the plain. Despite their name, the impervious Daunian Mountains (1,152 m), west of the plain, were strongly held by the Hirpini, an Oscan-speaking Samnite tribe.

Central Iapygia was composed of the Murge Plateau (686 m), an area poor in rivers. The western half of the massif was suitable only for grazing sheep; nearer the sea, the land was more adapted to cultivation, and likely used in ancient times to produce grains.

In the Salento peninsula, the landscape was more varied, though still without river formation. Olives are known to have been cultivated in this area during the pre-Roman period, but the scale of the production is uncertain. Several Greek colonies were located on the coast of the Gulf of Taranto, nearby the indigenous Messapians in southern Iapygia, most notably Taras, founded in the late 8th century BC, and Metapontion, founded in the late 7th century.

== Culture ==
=== Language ===
- Balkanic
  - Armenian
  - Graeco-Albanian
    - Graeco-Phrygian
      - Greek
      - Phrygian
        (extinct)
    - "Illyric"
      - Messapic
        (extinct)
      - Albanian

The Palaeo-Balkanic Indo-European branch based on the chapter "Albanian" (Hyllested & Joseph 2022) in Olander (ed.) The Indo-European Language Family

The Iapygians were a "relatively homogeneous linguistic community" speaking a non-Italic, Indo-European language, commonly called 'Messapic'. The language, written in variants of the Greek alphabet, is attested from the mid-6th to the late-2nd century BC. Some scholars have argued that the term 'Iapygian languages' should be preferred to refer to those dialects, and the term 'Messapic' reserved to the inscriptions found in the Salento peninsula, where the specific Messapian people dwelt in the pre-Roman era.

Messapic is grouped in the same Indo-European branch with Albanian, titled Albanoid or Illyric. Hyllested & Joseph (2022), in agreement with recent bibliography, identify Graeco-Phrygian as the IE branch closest to the Albanian-Messapic one. These two branches form an areal grouping – which is often called "Balkan IE" – with Armenian.

During the 6th century BC, Messapia, and more marginally Peucetia, underwent Hellenizing cultural influences, mainly from the nearby Taras. The use of writing systems was introduced in this period, with the acquisition of the Laconian-Tarantine alphabet and its adaptation to the Messapic language. The second great Hellenizing wave occurred during the 4th century BC, this time also involving Daunia and marking the beginning of Peucetian and Daunian epigraphic records, in a local variant of the Hellenistic alphabet that replaced the older Messapic script.

Since its settlement, Messapic was in contact with the Italic languages of the region. In the centuries before Roman annexation, the frontier between Messapic and Oscan ran through Frentania-Irpinia-Lucania-Apulia. A gradual process of 'Oscanization' and 'Samnitization' took place, attested in contemporary sources by the coexistence of dual identities within individual settlements. In these regions, Oscan- and Lucanian-speaking groups interacted and intermingled with the Daunian population in varying configurations. Thus, Larinum, while being described as a "Daunian city", has produced a large body of Oscan onomastics. Horace, a native of Venusia in the borderland between Daunian and Lucanian territories, characterised himself as "Lucanian or Apulian". From the early 4th century BCE onward, the establishment of Roman colonies in southern Italy profoundly altered this landscape, accelerating the process of Latinisation in the area.

By the 4th century BC, inscriptions from central Iapygia suggest that the local artisan class had acquired some proficiency in the Greek language, while the whole regional elite was used to learning Latin by the 3rd century BC. The Oscan language became also widespread after Italic peoples had occupied the territory in that period. Along with the Messapic dialects, Greek, Oscan and Latin were consequently spoken and written all together in the whole region of Iapygia during the Romanization period, and bilingualism in Greek and Messapic was probably common in the Salento peninsula.

=== Religion ===
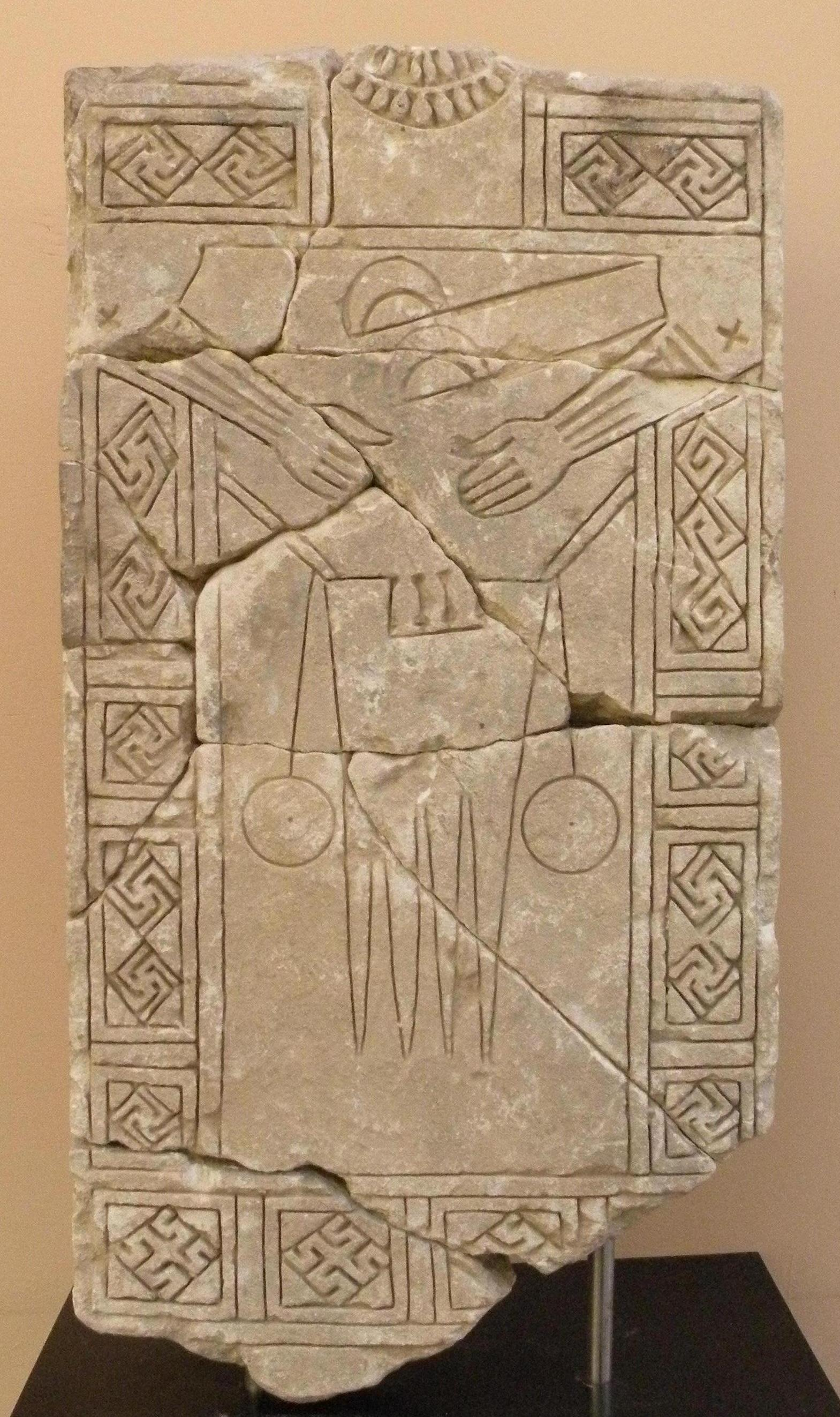
Anthropomorphic stelae from Daunia (610–550 BC).

Archaeological evidence indicates that most of the pre-Roman cult places in Apulia were preliminary used by the local population from the 8th century BCE down to the 2nd century BCE.

The late pre-Roman religion of the Iapygians appears as a substrate of indigenous beliefs mixed with Greek elements. The Roman conquest probably accelerated the hellenisation of a region already influenced by contacts with Magna Grecia from the 8th century BC onward. Aphrodite and Athena were thus worshipped in Iapygia as Aprodita and Athana, respectively. Some deities of native origin have also been highlighted by scholars, such as Zis ('sky-god'), Menzanas ('lord of horses'), Venas ('desire'), Taotor ('the people, community'), and perhaps Damatura ('mother-earth').

Pre-Roman religious cults have also left few material traces. Preserved evidence indicates that indigenous Iapygian beliefs featured the worship of the Indo-European sky god Zis, the practice of living horse sacrifice to Zis Menzanas (Iovis/Iuppiter Menzanas), the fulfilling of oracles for anyone who slept wrapped in the skin of a sacrificed ewe, and the curative powers of the waters at the herõon of the god Podalirius, preserved in Greek tales. Several cave sanctuaries have been identified on the coast, most notably the Grotta Porcinara sanctuary (Santa Maria di Leuca), in which both Messapian and Greek marines used to write their vows on the walls. Another identified maritime cave sanctuary is the Grotta Poesia in Roca (Lecce), which contains hundreds of inscriptions, and hand, animal, and spiral carvings. The Messapic deity Taotor was also worshipped there, frequently receiving the epithet andiraho, meaning "infernal" or "of the cave."

Additional marine cult sanctuaries have been identified along the Apulian coast, including sites at Torre dell’Orso and Castro, as well as the Grotta di Capelvenere. Cult practices at these sites included the use of fire pits containing the remains of possible caprine sacrifices, indicating that the sanctuaries likely also possessed a fertility-related character.

It is likely that Peucetians had no civic cult requiring public buildings, and if urban sanctuaries have been identified in Daunia (at Teanum Apulum, Lavello, or Canosa), no conspicuous buildings are found before the Romanization period.

=== Dress ===
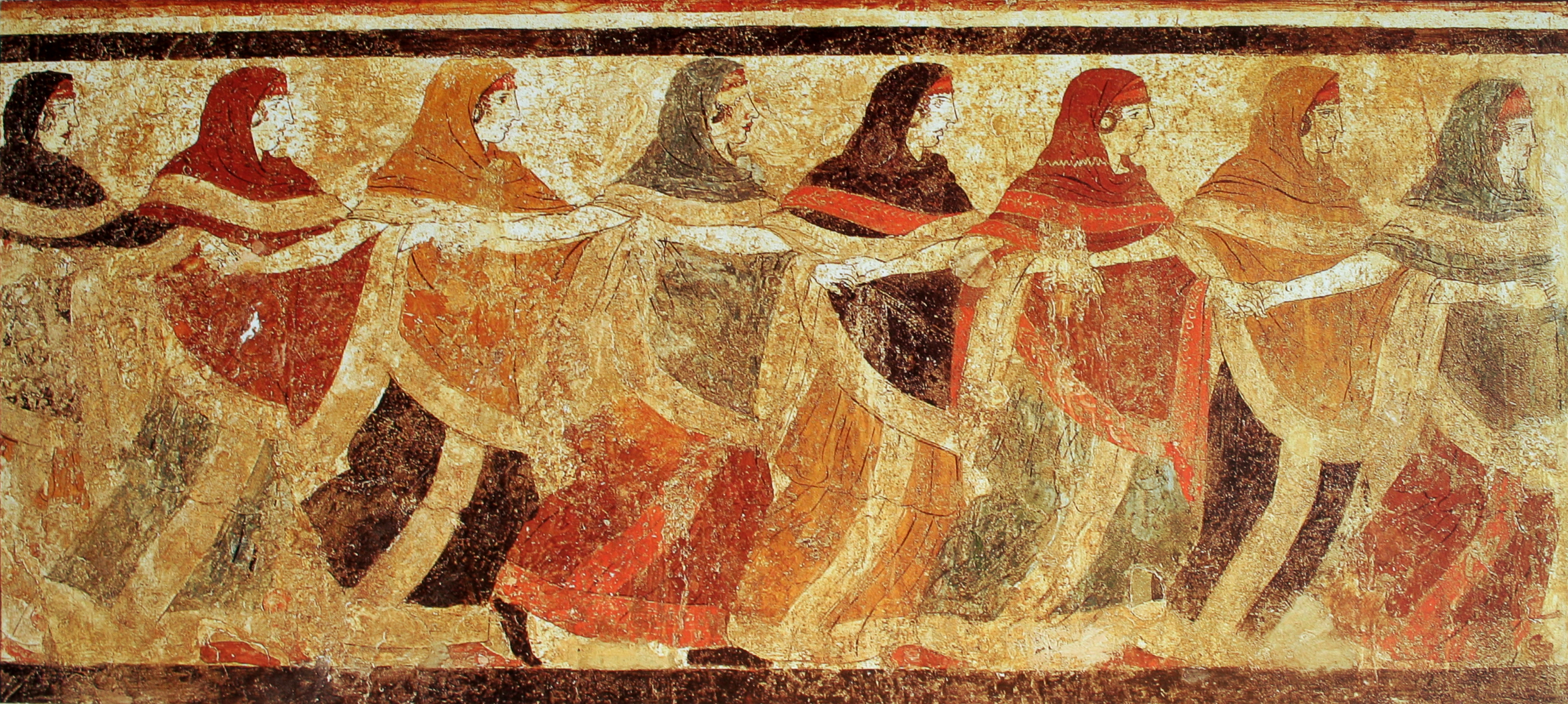
Fresco depicting Peucetian women performing a chorea

The Iapygian peoples were noted for their ornamental dress. By the 7th century BC, the Daunian aristocracy were wearing highly ornate costumes and much jewellery, a custom that persisted into the classical period, with depictions of Iapygians with long hair, wearing highly patterned short tunics with elaborate fringes. Young women were portrayed with long tunics belted at the waist, generally with a headband or diadem. On ritual or ceremonial occasions, the women of central Iapygia wore a distinctive form of mantle over their heads that left the headband visible above the brow.

=== Burial ===
Iapygian funeral traditions were distinct from those of neighbouring Italic peoples: whereas the latter banished adult burials to the fringes of their settlements, the inhabitants of Iapygia buried their dead both outside and inside their own settlements. Although females might occasionally be buried with weapons, arms, and armour, such grave-goods were normally reserved for male funerals.

Until the end of the 4th century BC, the normal practice among Daunians and Peucetians was to lay out the body in a fetal position with the legs drawn up towards the chest, perhaps symbolising the rebirth of the soul in the womb of Mother Earth. Messapians, by contrast, laid out their dead in the extended position as did other Italic peoples. From the 3rd century BC, extended burials with the body lying on its back began to appear in Daunia and Peucetia, although the previous custom survived well into the 2nd century BC in some areas.

== History ==
Iapygian migrations in the early first millennium BC.

=== Origin ===
The emergence of a distinct Iapygian culture in south-eastern Italy is widely regarded by modern scholarship as the result of a convergence between local Apulian material cultures and influences from the Balkan region, following the cross-Adriatic migrations of proto-Messapic speakers in the early first millennium BC. (Note: Boardman & Sollberger 1982, p. 231: "Apart from the spears and spear-heads of 'South-Illyrian' type (...), a connexion can be traced between Albania and Italy through various features in the pottery (shapes, handles; later on also painted geometric decoration); for although in Albania they derive from an earlier local tradition, they seem to represent new elements in Italy. In the same way we can account for the fibulae – typically Illyrian – arching in a simple curve with or without buttons, which one finds in southern Italy and in Sicily, and also some in which the curve is decorated with 'herring-bone' incisions, like examples from the eastern coast of the Adriatic. These influences appear finally in the rites of burial in tumuli in the contracted position, which are seen at this period in southern Italy, especially in Apulia. There is also evidence, as we have seen elsewhere, for supposing that in the diffusion of these Illyrian influences in Italy the Illyrian tribes which were displaced at the beginning of this period from the South-Eastern sea-board of the Adriatic and passed over into Italy may have played a significant role."; Wilkes 1992, p. 68: "...the Messapian language recorded on more than 300 inscriptions is in some respects similar to Balkan Illyrian. This link is also reflected in the material culture of both shores of the southern Adriatic. Archaeologists have concluded that there was a phase of Illyrian migration into Italy early in the first millennium BC."; Fortson 2004, p. 407: "They are linked by ancient historians with Illyria, across the Adriatic sea; the linkage is borne out archaeologically by similarities between Illyrian and Messapic metalwork and ceramics, and by personal names that appear in both locations. For this reason, the Messapic language has often been connected by modern scholars to Illyrian; but, as noted above, we have too little Illyrian to be able to test this claim.")

Ancient literary traditions, by contrast, commonly traced the origins of the Iapygians to Crete in the Minoan period. Herodotus recounts a Cretan landing in Iapygia and the subsequent renaming of the settlers as Iḗpyges Messápioi. Strabo, Solon and Nicander derived the Iapygians from the mythical Iapyx, while Nicander further attributed to them Arcadian and Illyrian origins. Hellanicus claimed that the Iapygians expelled the Ausonii from Italy, a tradition that may correspond to Ephoros' reference to Iapýgōn ákrai in the area of Croton.

=== Pre-Roman period ===
The Iapygians most likely left the eastern coasts of the Adriatic for Italy from the 11th century BC onwards, merging with pre-existing Italic and Mycenean cultures and providing a decisive cultural and linguistic imprint. The three main Iapygian tribal groups–Daunians, Peucetians and Messapians–retained a remarkable cultural unity in the first phase of their development. After the 8th century BC, however, archaeology documents increasing differentiation among the three tribes due to internal and external causes.

Contacts between Messapians and Greeks intensified after the end of the 8th century BC and the foundation of the Spartan colony of Taras (Tarantum), preceded by earlier pre-colonial Mycenaean incursions during which the site of Taras seems to have already played an important role. Until the end of the 7th century, however, Iapygia was generally not encompassed in the area of influence of Greek colonial territories, and with the exception of Taras, the inhabitants were evidently able to avoid other Greek colonies in the region. During the 6th century BC Messapia, and more marginally Peucetia, underwent Hellenizing cultural influences, mainly from the nearby Taras.

The relationship between Messapians and Tarantines deteriorated over time, resulting in a series of clashes between the two peoples from the beginning of the 5th century BC. After two victories of the Tarentines, the Iapygians inflicted a decisive defeat upon Taras in 470 BC, causing the fall of the aristocratic government and the implementation of a democratic one in Taras. Those confrontations froze relations between Greeks and the indigenous people for about half a century. Only in the late-5th and 6th centuries did they re-establish relationships. The second great Hellenizing wave occurred during the 4th century BC, this time also involving Daunia. In 413 BC the Iapygian-Messapian ruler Artas supported Athens during the Sicilian Expedition.

=== Roman conquest ===
The Roman conquest of Iapygia started in the late 4th century, with the subjugation of the Canusini and the Teanenses. It paved the way for Roman hegemony in the entire peninsula, as they used their progression in the region to contain Samnite power and encircle their territory during the Samnite Wars. By the early third century, Rome had planted two strategic colonies, Luceria (314) and Venusia (291), on the border of Iapygia and Samnium.

== Social organization ==
=== Early settlements ===
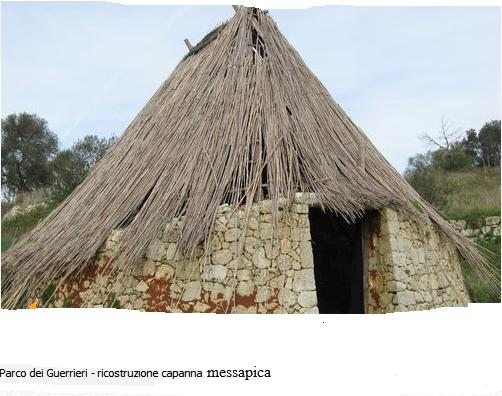
Reconstructed Messapian hut (Poggiardo, Italy).

In the early period, the Iapygian housing system was made up of small groups of huts scattered throughout the territory, different from the later Greco-Roman tradition of cities. The inhabitants of the rural districts gathered for common decisions, for feasts, for religious practices and rites, and to defend themselves against external attacks.

From the 6th century BC onward, the large but thinly occupied settlements that had been founded around the beginning of the first millennium BC began to take on a more structured form. The largest of them gradually gained the administrative capacity and the manpower to erect stone defensive walls and eventually to mint their own coins, indicating both urbanization and the assertion of political autonomy.

=== Emergence of city-states ===
By the late 5th century BC, Thucydides noted that some of these Iapygian communities were ruled by powerful individuals, such as the Iapygian king Opis, allied with the Peucetians before being slain by the Tarentines, and the dynast Artas, leader of the Messapians, who provided military support to the Athenians in 413 BC.

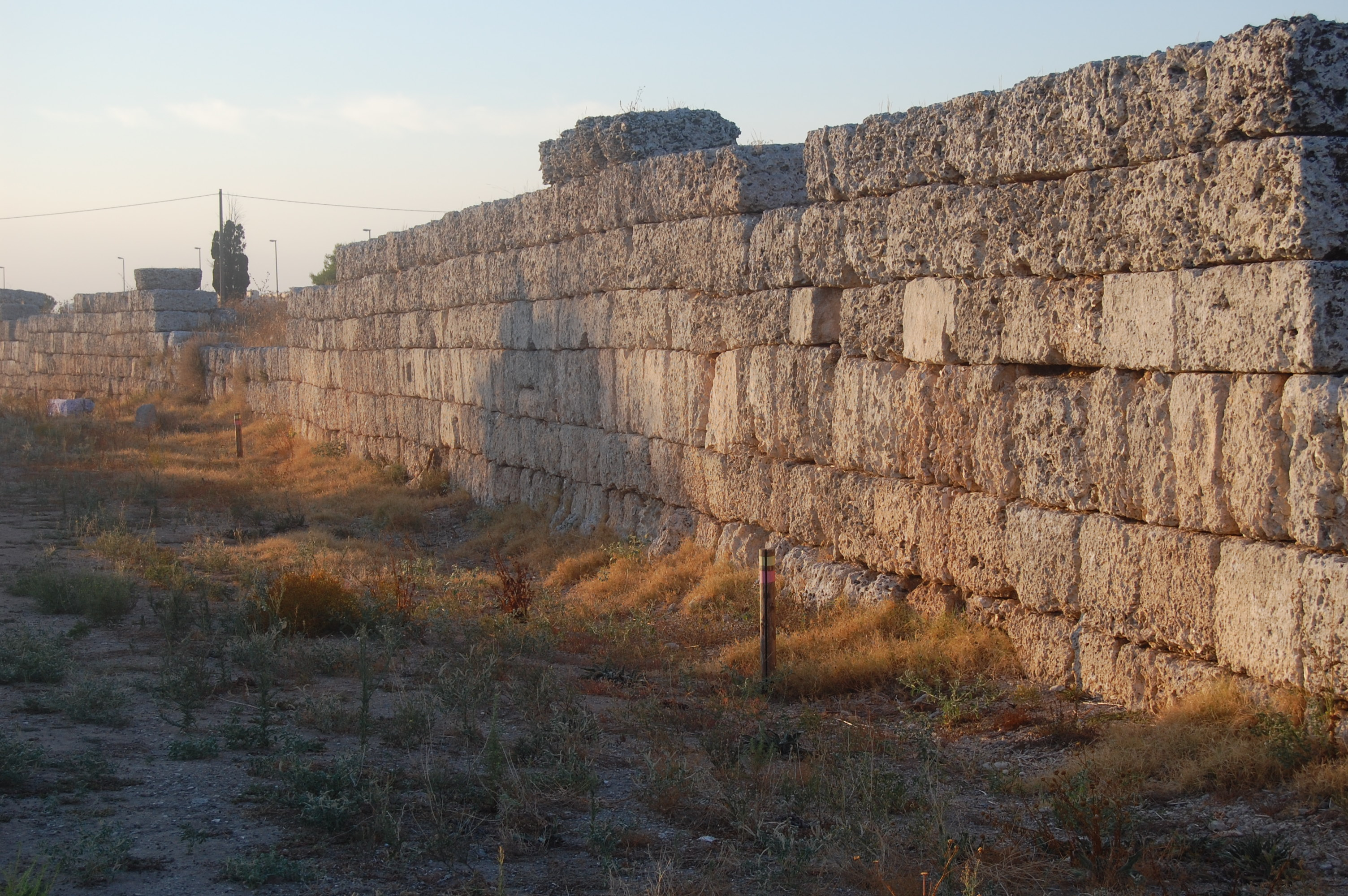
Messapian walls of Manduria (Apulia, Italy)

A small number of settlements had grown into such large fortified centres that they probably regarded themselves as autonomous city-states by the end of the 4th century, and some of the northern cities were seemingly in control of an extensive territory during that period. Arpi, who had the largest earthen ramparts of Iapygia in the Iron Age, and Canusium, whose territory probably straddled the Ofanto River from the coast up to Venusia, appear to have grown into regional hegemonic powers.

This regional hierarchy of urban power, in which a few dominant city-states competed with each other in order to assert their own hegemony over limited resources, most likely led to frequent internecine warfare between the various Iapygian groups, and to external conflicts between them and foreign communities.

It is possible that the Messapians, Peucetians, and likely the Daunians were organised into semi-autonomous local districts, each centered on a nucleated settlement similar to a Greek polis. These districts were typically governed by dynasts from aristocratic families or elites, and in times of war, they could unite under a common royal leader to form larger ethnic groups.

== Warfare ==
As evidenced by items found in graves and warriors shown on red-figure vase paintings, Iapigyan fought with little other defensive armour than a shield, sometimes a leather helmet and a jerkin, exceptionally a breastplate. Their most frequent weapon was the thrusting spear, followed by the javelin, whereas swords were relatively rare. Bronze belts were also a common item found in warrior graves.

Scenes of combat depicted on red-figure vase paintings also demonstrate that the various Iapygian communities were frequently involved in conflict with each other, and that prisoners of war were taken for ransom or to be sold into slavery.

== Economy ==
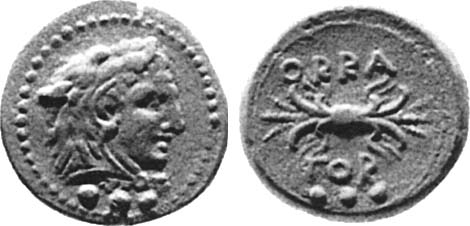
Roman coin portraying Hercules from Oria, the most ancient Iapygian city.

Archaeological evidence suggests that transhumance was practised in pre-Roman Iapygia during the first millennium BC, and that wide areas of the region were reserved to provide pasture for transhumant sheep. Weaving was indeed an important activity in the 5th and 4th centuries BC. The textile made from wool was most likely marketed in the Greek colony of Taras, and the winter destination of Iapygian pastoralists probably located in the Tavoliere plain, where the weaving industry was already well developed by the seventh or early sixth century BC, as evidenced by the depiction of weavers at work on a stelae.

== See also ==
- List of ancient Illyrian peoples and tribes
- List of ancient peoples of Italy

== Bibliography ==
- Adams, James N. (2003). Bilingualism and the Latin Language. Cambridge University Press. ISBN 978-0-521-81771-4.
- Boardman, John; Sollberger, E. (1982). J. Boardman; I. E. S. Edwards; N. G. L. Hammond; E. Sollberger (eds.). The Cambridge Ancient History: The Prehistory of the Balkans; and the Middle East and the Aegean world, tenth to eighth centuries B.C. Vol. III (part 1) (2 ed.). Cambridge University Press. ISBN 0521224969.
- De Simone, Carlo (2017). "Messapic". In Klein, Jared; Joseph, Brian; Fritz, Matthias (eds.). Handbook of Comparative and Historical Indo-European Linguistics. Vol. 3. Walter de Gruyter. ISBN 978-3-11-054243-1.
- Fortson, Benjamin W. (2004). Indo-European Language and Culture. Blackwell Publishing. ISBN 1-4051-0316-7.
- Fronda, Michael P. (2006). "Livy 9.20 and Early Roman Imperialism in Apulia". Historia: Zeitschrift für Alte Geschichte. 55 (4): 397–417. doi:10.25162/historia-2006-0026. ISSN 0018-2311. JSTOR 4436827. S2CID 159745099.
- Graham, A. J. (1982). "The Colonial Expansion of Greece". In John Boardman; N. G. L. Hammond (eds.). The Cambridge Ancient History: The Expansion of the Greek World, Eighth to Sixth Centuries B.C. Vol. III (part 3) (2 ed.). Cambridge University Press. ISBN 0521234476.
- Gruen, Erich S. (2005). Cultural borrowings and ethnic appropriations in antiquity. F. Steiner. ISBN 978-3-515-08735-3.
- Hyllested, Adam; Joseph, Brian D. (2022). "Albanian". The Indo-European Language Family. Cambridge University Press. ISBN 9781108499798.
- Krahe, Hans (1946). "Die illyrische Namengebung, 3. Götternamen" (PDF). Würzburger Jahrbücher f. D. Altertumswissenschaft. 1 (Heft 2): 199–204. S2CID 54995190. Archived from the original (PDF) on 2019-03-07.
- Lamboley, Jean-Luc (1996). Recherches sur les Messapiens, IVe-IIe siècle avant J.-C. Bibliothèque des Écoles françaises d'Athènes et de Rome. ISBN 2728303606.
- Lamboley, Jean-Luc (2000). "Les cultes de l'Adriatique méridionale à l'époque républicaine". In Christiane, Delplace (ed.). Les cultes polythéistes dans l'Adriatique romaine. Ausonius Éditions. ISBN 978-2-35613-260-4.
- Lombardo, Mario (2006). "Iapyges, Iapygia". Brill's New Pauly. doi:10.1163/1574-9347_bnp_e521200.
- Lombardo, Mario (2014). "Iapygians: The indigenous populations of ancient Apulia in the fifth and fourth centuries BCE". In Carpenter, T. H.; Lynch, K. M.; Robinson, E. G. D. (eds.). The Italic People of Ancient Apulia: New Evidence from Pottery for Workshops, Markets, and Customs. Cambridge University Press. pp. 36–68. doi:10.1017/CBO9781107323513.004. ISBN 978-1-139-99270-1.
- Mallory, James P.; Adams, Douglas Q. (1997). Encyclopedia of Indo-European Culture. London: Routledge. ISBN 978-1-884964-98-5.
- Marchesini, Simona (2009). Le lingue frammentarie dell'Italia antica: manuale per lo studio delle lingue preromane. U. Hoepli. ISBN 978-88-203-4166-4.

Marchesini, Simona (2023). "Ancient Pilgrimage and Inscriptions. Examples from Pre-Roman Rock-Inscriptions of Italy". OpenEdition Journals. 17.

- Matzinger, Joachim (2015). "Messapico e illirico". Idomeneo. 19. University of Salento: 57–66. doi:10.1285/i20380313v19p57. ISSN 2038-0313.
- Matzinger, Joachim (2017). "The Lexicon of Albanian". In Klein, Jared; Joseph, Brian; Fritz, Matthias (eds.). Handbook of Comparative and Historical Indo-European Linguistics. Vol. 3. Walter de Gruyter. ISBN 978-3-11-054243-1.
- Matzinger, Joachim (2021). "Ancient Languages of the Balkans". In Götz Keydana; Wolfgang Hock; Paul Widmer (eds.). Comparison and Gradation in Indo-European. Walter de Gruyter GmbH & Co KG. ISBN 9783110637434.
- McInerney, Jeremy (2014). A Companion to Ethnicity in the Ancient Mediterranean. John Wiley & Sons. ISBN 978-1-4443-3734-1.
- Pallottino, Massimo (1992). "The Beliefs and Rites of the Apulians, an Indigenous People of Southeastern Italy". In Bonnefoy, Yves (ed.). Roman and European Mythologies. University of Chicago Press. ISBN 978-0-226-06455-0.
- Salvemini, Biagio; Massafra, Angelo, eds. (2005). Storia della Puglia. Dalle origini al Seicento. Vol. 1. Laterza. ISBN 8842077992.
- Small, Alastair (2014). "Pots, Peoples and Places in Fourth-Century B.C.E. Apulia". In Carpenter, T. H.; Lynch, K. M.; Robinson, E. G. D. (eds.). The Italic People of Ancient Apulia: New Evidence from Pottery for Workshops, Markets, and Customs. Cambridge University Press. pp. 13–35. doi:10.1017/CBO9781107323513.004. ISBN 978-1-139-99270-1.
- Søborg, Tobias Mosbæk (2020). Sigmatic Verbal Formations in Anatolian and Indo-European: A Cladistic Study (Thesis). University of Copenhagen, Department of Nordic Studies and Linguistics.
- Torelli, Mario (1995). Studies in the Romanization of Italy. University of Alberta. ISBN 0888642415.
- Palmer, Leonard Robert (1988). The Latin Language. University of Oklahoma Press. ISBN 080612136X.
- Trumper, John (2018). "Some Celto-Albanian isoglosses and their implications". In Grimaldi, Mirko; Lai, Rosangela; Franco, Ludovico; Baldi, Benedetta (eds.). Structuring Variation in Romance Linguistics and Beyond: In Honour of Leonardo M. Savoia. John Benjamins Publishing Company. ISBN 9789027263179.
- F. W. Walbank; A. E. Astin; M. W. Frederiksen; R. M. Ogilvie, eds. (1989). "Rome and Italy in the Early Third Century". The Cambridge Ancient History: The Rise of Rome to 220 B.C. Vol. VII (part 2) (2 ed.). Cambridge University Press. ISBN 0-521-23446-8.
- West, Morris L. (2007). Indo-European Poetry and Myth. Oxford University Press. ISBN 978-0199280759.
- Wilkes, J. J. (1992). The Illyrians. Oxford, United Kingdom: Blackwell Publishing. ISBN 0-631-19807-5.
- Yntema, Douwe (2017). "The Pre-Roman Peoples of Apulia (1000-100 BC)". In Gary D. Farney, Guy Bradley (ed.). The Peoples of Ancient Italy. De Gruyter Reference. Walter de Gruyter GmbH & Co KG. pp. 337–. ISBN 9781614513001.

=== Further reading ===
- De Juliis, Ettore M. (1988). Gli Iapigi: storia e civiltà della Puglia preromana. Longanesi. ISBN 978-88-304-0796-1.
