= Teanum =

Teanum may refer to:

- Teanum Apulum, near modern San Paolo di Civitate, in Apulia, Italy
- Teanum Sicidinum, modern Teano, in Campania, Italy
