= Galabri =

Ancient Dardanian people

The Galabri (Ancient Greek: Γαλάβριοι) were a Dardanian tribe, along with the Thunatae, mentioned by Strabo.

== Name ==
The tribe is mentioned by Ancient Greek author Strabo in his Geographica as Γαλάβριοι Galabrioi. The tribal name Galabri/Galabrioi has been connected to the Messapic name Calabri/Calabrioi in Salento (south-eastern Italy). It has been further connected to the Albanian toponym Gallapi in present-day north-eastern Kosovo.

== Geography ==
According to Strabo an old city was located in the region of the Dardanian tribe of the Galabri. It has been tentatively suggested that it should be sought at Kale in Skopje.

Strabo's account indicates higher social development and acculturation in the area; also the informations provided by other classical sources concerning the Dardanians suggest that their society was at an advanced phase of development.

== See also ==
- Dardania (Roman province)
- List of ancient tribes in Illyria

== Bibliography ==
- Baliu, Begzad (2012). Onomastikë dhe identitet [Onomastics and Identity] (PDF) (in Albanian). Era. ISBN 978-9951-04-071-6.
- Šašel Kos, Marjeta (2010). "Peoples on the northern fringes of the Greek world: Illyria as seen by Strabo". In Jean-Luc Lamboley, Maria Paola Castiglioni (ed.). L'Illyrie méridionale et l'Épire dans l'Antiquité V: Actes du Ve colloque international de Grenoble (8–11 octobre 2008). L'Illyrie méridionale et l'Épire dans l'Antiquité (V). Vol. 2. De Boccard Editions. pp. 617–629. ISBN 9782951943339.
- Shukriu, Edi (1996). Dardania paraurbane: studime arkeologjike të Kosovës [Pre-urban Dardania: Archaeological Studies of Kosova]. Biblioteka "Fryma" (in Albanian). Vol. 13. Pejë: Dukagjini.
