= Bardhyl =

- Gender: male

Origin
- Origin: Albanian
- Meaning: bardh ("white") + yll ("star")
- Region of origin: Albania

Other names
- Variant forms: Bardhyll, Bardhul

Bardhyl, Bardhyll or Bardhul is an Albanian masculine given name meaning 'the white/bright one', also reflected from the Illyrian name Bardylis and Messapic Barzidihi and Barduli. The same root is found in the Albanian given name Bardh-i (masculine) and Bardh-a (feminine), as well as in the Albanian surname Bardhi, meaning 'the white one'.

== Etymology ==
The oldest attested variant of Bardhyl is Bardylis, the name of a 4th-century BCE Illyrian king, and founder of the first attested Illyrian dynasty. The name was again carried by Bardylis' grandson, Bardylis II, son of Cleitus, who ruled from c. 295 to c. 290 BCE. Both were enemies of the Kingdom of Macedonia. Variant names are also attested in Messapic Barzidihi and Barduli in Apulia. The name contains the same root as the Albanian adjective i bardhë "white", ultimately from Proto-Indo-European *bʰór(h₁)ǵos < *bʰreh₁ǵ- ("to gleam, shine").

The name gained popularity among Albanians during the communist rule of Albania, serving as a more atheistic, and nationalistic identification.

The animal genus Bardylis (wasp) is named after Bardylis.

== Persons with the name Bardhyl ==
Bardhyl, Bardhyll, Bardhill, Bardhull and other variants are more popularly held by irreligious Albanians. Notable bearers include

- Bardylis, king of Dardania
- Bardylis II, his grandson
- Bardhyl Ajeti (1977–2005), Albanian journalist reporter for the Albanian newspaper Bota Sot
- Bardhyl Çaushi, Kosovo Albanian human rights lawyer and activist
- Bardhyl Demiraj (born 1958), Albanian linguist and Albanologist
- Bardhyl Kollçaku (born 1967), Albanian military officer
- Bardhyl Londo (1948–2022), Albanian poet and writer
- Bardhyl Çaushi (1936–1999), Kosovo Albanian human rights lawyer and activist

== Bibliography ==
- Bejko, Lorenc, ed. (2004). Die Illyrer: Katalog zu einer Ausstellung von archäologischen Funden der albanischen Eisenzeit (12.-4. Jh. v. Chr.) aus den Sammlungen des Archäologischen Institutes der Albanischen Akademie der Wissenschaften in Tirana und des Archäologischen Museums in Durres, Albanien; Sonderausstellung im Museum für Urgeschichte des Landes Niederösterreich, Asparn an der Zaya, vom 3. April bis 30. November 2004. Amt der Niederösterreichischen Landesregierung, Abteilung Kultur und Wissenschaft. ISBN 9783854602156.
- Ivić, Pavle (1987). Recueil de la Sixième Conférence yougoslave d'onomastique. Srpska akademija nauka i umetnosti. ISBN 9788670250758.
- Rosetti, Alexandru (1973). Brève histoire de la langue roumaine des origines à nos jours. Mouton.
- Demiraj, Bardhyl (1997). Albanische Etymologien: Untersuchungen zum albanischen Erbwortschatz. Leiden Studies in Indo-European (in German). Vol. 7. Amsterdam, Atlanta: Rodopi. ISBN 9789042001619.
