= Thunatae =

Ancient Dardanian people

The Thunatae (Ancient Greek: Θουνᾶται) were a Dardanian tribe, along with the Galabri, mentioned by Strabo. The Thunatae are mentioned as neighbors of the Maedi, a Thracian tribe.

== Name ==
The tribe is mentioned by Ancient Greek author Strabo in his Geographica as Θουνᾶται Thunatai. The tribal name Thunatae/Thunatai has been connected to the Messapic name Daunioi/Daunii in Apulia (south-eastern Italy).

== Geography ==
According to Strabo the Thunatae were a Dardanian tribe who bordered with the Thracian Maedi in the east.

Some scholars have suggested that the Thunatae may have been a Thracian people or probably strongly influenced by the neighbouring Thracians. However Strabo explicitly considers the Thunatae as a Dardanian people, also separating them from the Thracian tribe Maedi, hence from the Thracians. Strabo's account provides evidence that in their eastern territory the Dardanians bordered the Thracians.

== See also ==
- Dardania (Roman province)
- List of ancient tribes in Illyria

== Bibliography ==
- Šašel Kos, Marjeta (2010). "Peoples on the northern fringes of the Greek world: Illyria as seen by Strabo". In Jean-Luc Lamboley, Maria Paola Castiglioni (ed.). L'Illyrie méridionale et l'Épire dans l'Antiquité V: Actes du Ve colloque international de Grenoble (8–11 octobre 2008). L'Illyrie méridionale et l'Épire dans l'Antiquité (V). Vol. 2. De Boccard Editions. pp. 617–629. ISBN 9782951943339.
- Shukriu, Edi (1996). Dardania paraurbane: studime arkeologjike të Kosovës [Pre-urban Dardania: Archaeological Studies of Kosova]. Biblioteka "Fryma" (in Albanian). Vol. 13. Pejë: Dukagjini.
