= Torre Sant'Andrea di Missipezza Lighthouse =

Torre Sant'Andrea di Missipezza
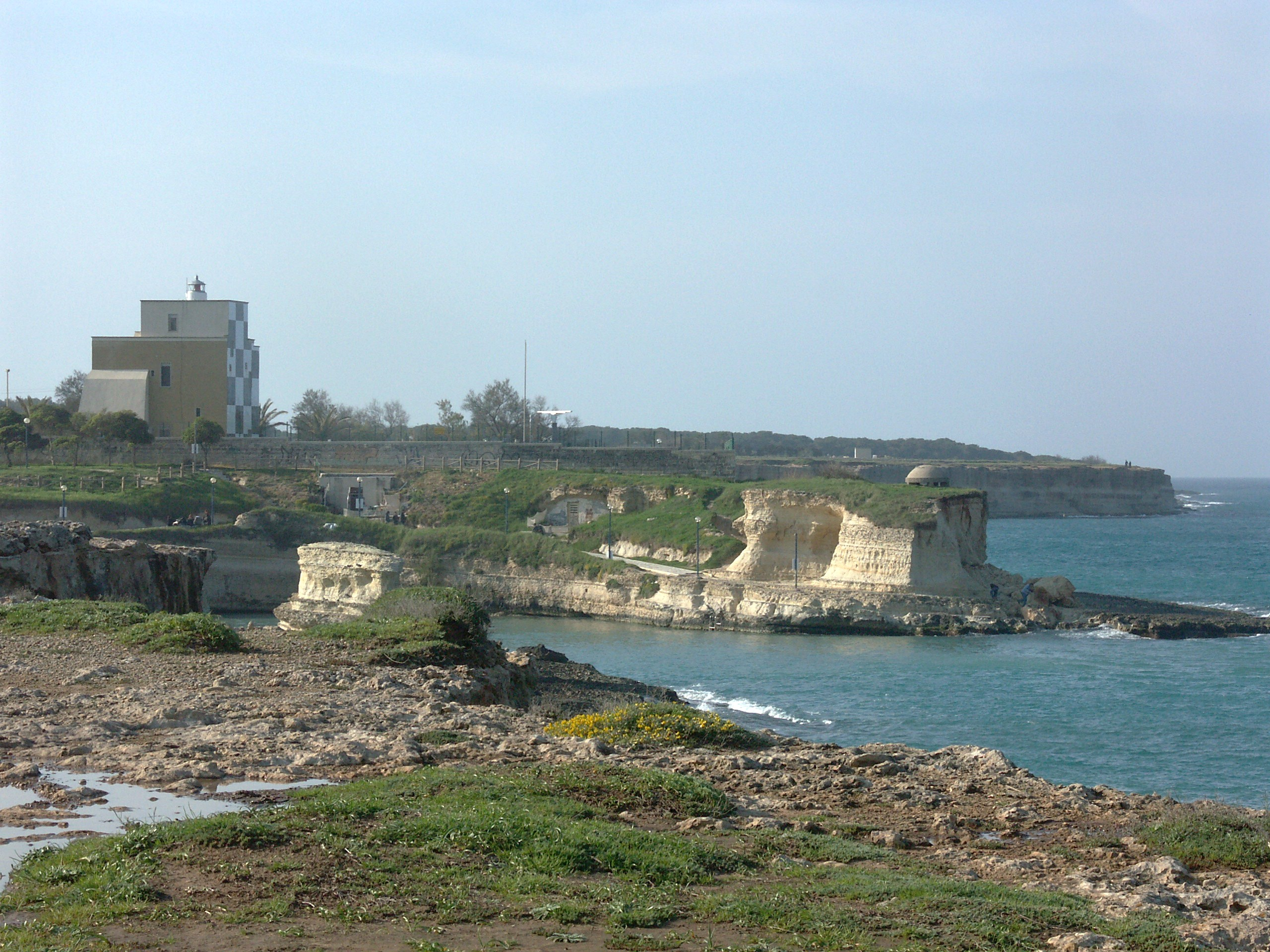
- Torre Sant'Andrea di Missipezza Lighthouse
- Location: Torre Sant'Andrea; Apulia; Italy
- Coordinates: 40°15′19″N 18°26′42″E

Tower
- Constructed: 1932
- Construction: masonry building
- Height: 16 metres (52 ft)
- Shape: quadrangular building with lantern atop
- Markings: seaward side painted in black and white checkerboard pattern, metallic grey lantern dome
- Power source: mains electricity
- Operator: Marina Militare

Light
- First lit: 1936
- Focal height: 24 metres (79 ft)
- Lens: type TD
- Intensity: AL 1000 W
- Range: main: 15 nautical miles (28 km; 17 mi) reserve: 11 nautical miles (20 km; 13 mi)
- Characteristic: Fl(2) WR 7s.
- Italy no.: 3608 E.F.

Torre Sant'Andrea di Missipezza Lighthouse (Italian: Faro di Torre Sant'Andrea di Missipezza) is an active lighthouse in the frazione of Torre Sant'Andrea in the municipality of Melendugno.

== Description ==
The light house consists of a lantern placed atop a massive masonry old defence tower with the seaward side painted with white and black checkerboard pattern, the other three sides are painted in white. The lighthouse was activated in 1936 and is 16 metres (52 ft) high; the lantern is positioned at a height of 24 metres (79 ft) above sea level. The lighthouse is fully automated and operated by the Lighthouses Service of Marina Militare, identified by the Country code number 3688 E.F. The light emits two white or red flashes, depending on direction, in a seven seconds period visible up to 15 nautical miles (28 km; 17 mi).

== See also ==
- List of lighthouses in Italy
