= Roca (archaeological site) =

Coordinates: 40°17′15″N 18°25′35″E

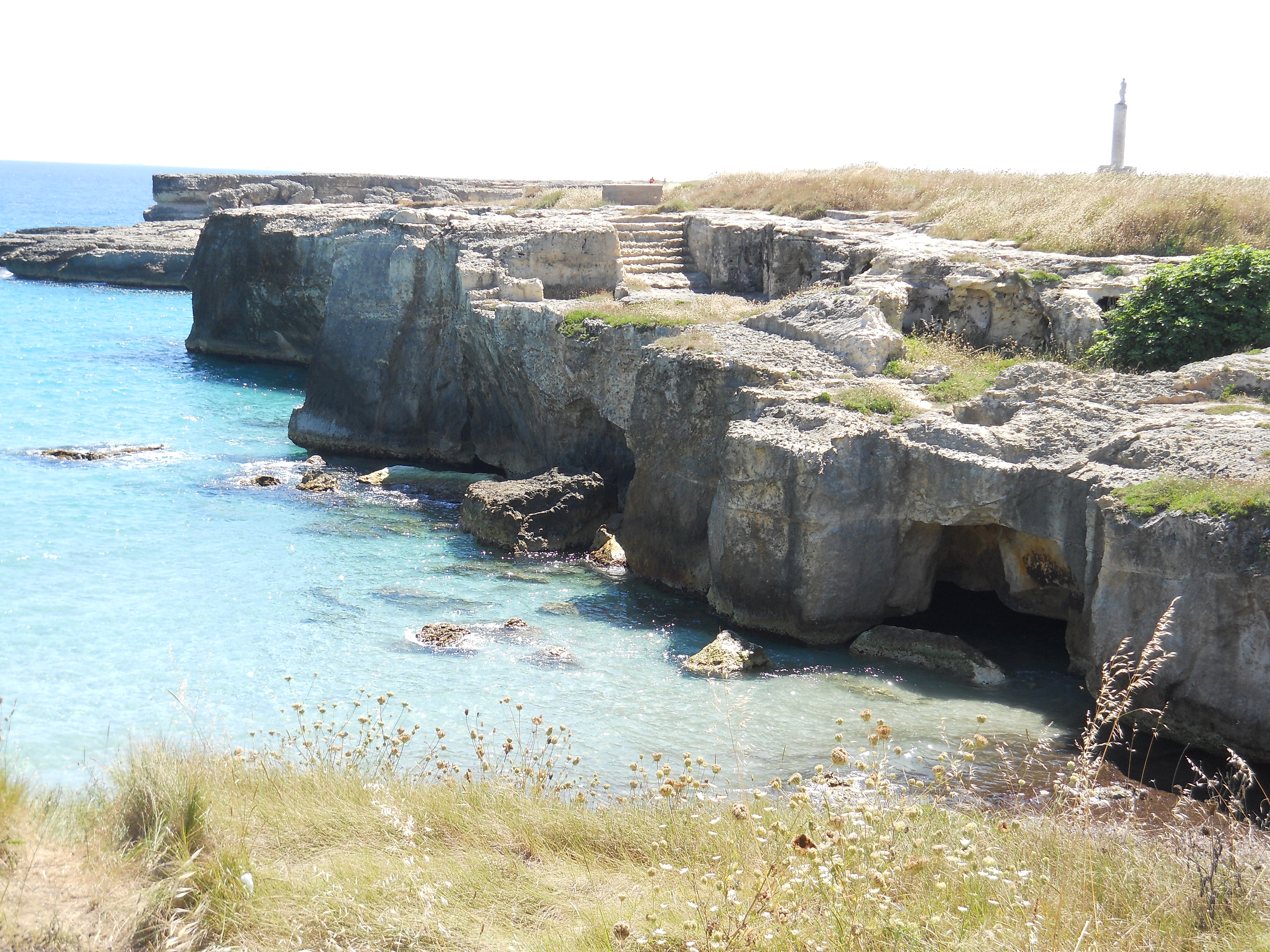
View of Roca Vecchia

Roca (also known as Rocavecchia or Roca Vecchia) is an archaeological site located on the Adriatic coast of Apulia in Southern Italy, a few kilometres from the modern town of Melendugno and close to the city of Lecce. The site, which has been explored since the end of the 1980s by a team of the University of Salento, has produced some of the best-preserved monumental architecture of the Bronze Age (2nd millennium BC) in Southern Italy, along with the largest set of Mycenaean pottery ever recovered west of mainland Greece.

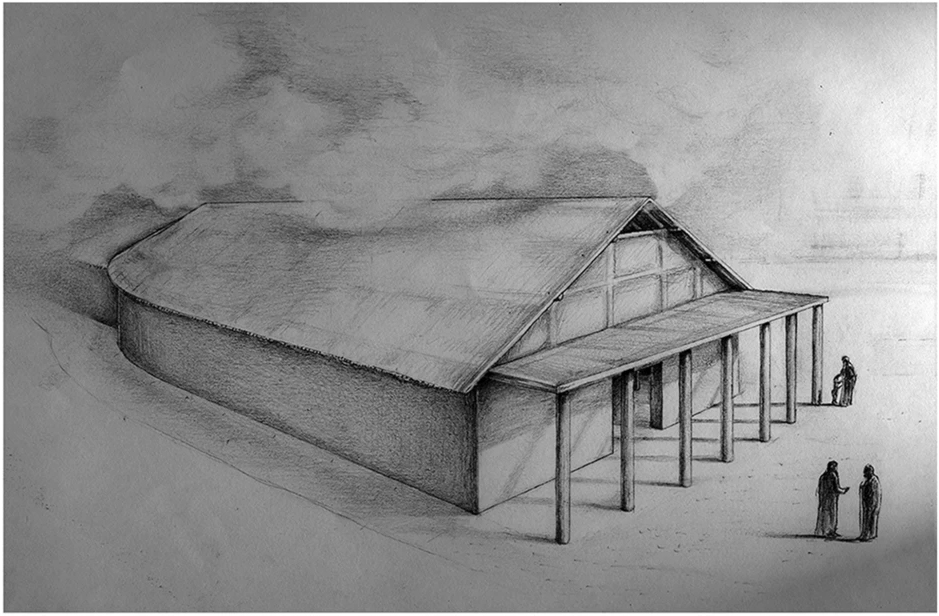
Late Bronze Age temple building at Roca Vecchia, Proto-Villanovan culture.

The occupation of the site continued also in the Iron Age and Classical times, when a large natural cavity known as Poesia Cave was used for cult practices involving the writing of thousands of dedications to a local deity in three languages: Greek, Messapic and Latin.

The site was re-occupied in late medieval times, when a new town was founded by Walter VI, Count of Brienne.

== Grotta della Poesia ==
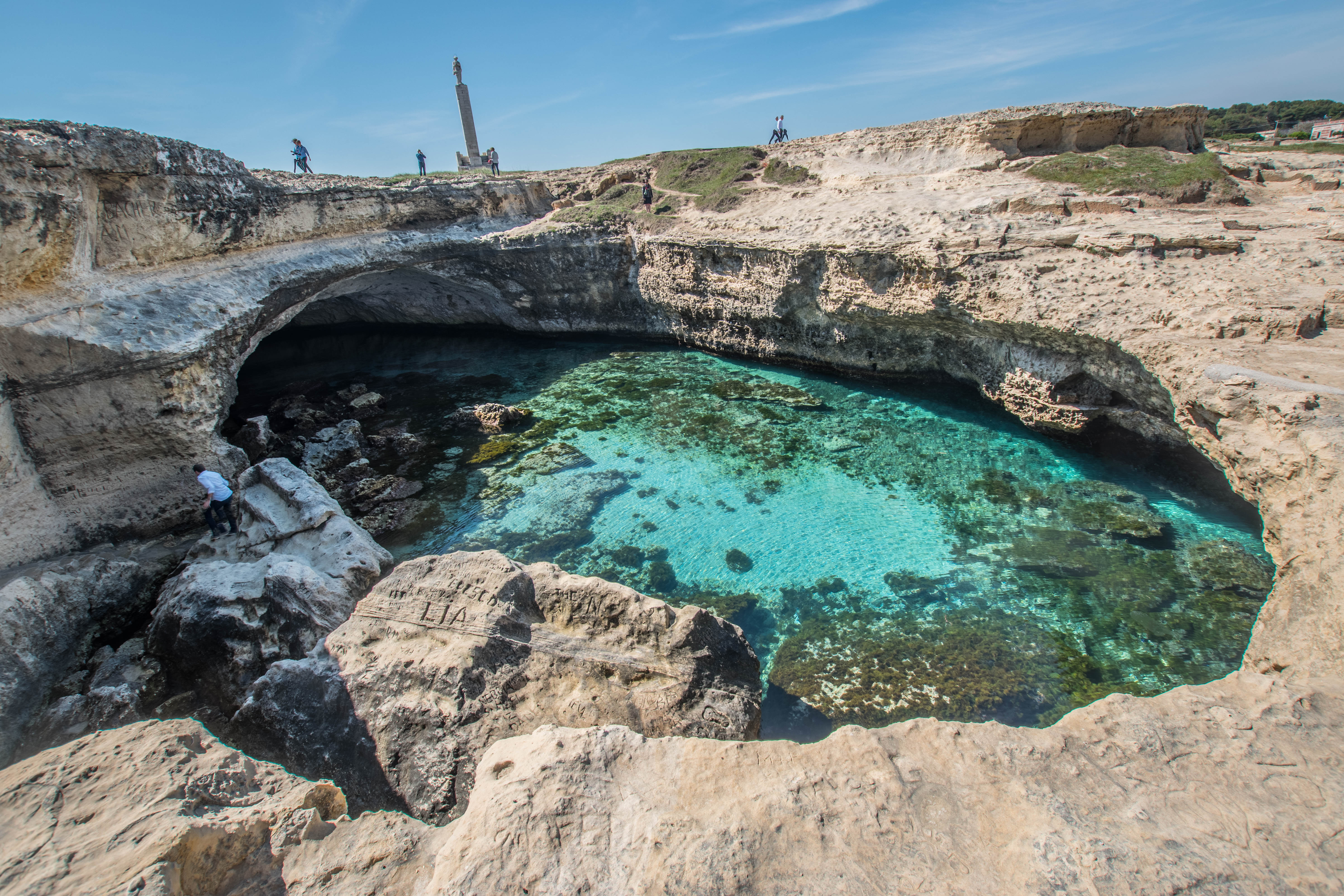
Grotta della Poesia

Grotta della Poesia (Poetry Cave) is one of the most well known natural rock formations inside the archaeological site. It is a natural pool that is recognized as one of the most beautiful natural pools in the world. The name originates from a legend that tells the story of a princess who liked to bathe in the waters of Grotta della Poesia. In turn, the beautiful princess has become the muse for countless poets in the Salento peninsula.

In reality the caves were most likely used for religious purposes. There are Messapian inscriptions on the wall that helped to decrypt the original purpose of the caves. From these inscriptions it becomes very clear that they are was dedicated to the worship of god Taotor, a Messapian deity.

This natural pool has attracted a flock of tourists each year. To combat this there has been an admission price introduced recently. It is in place to help protect this significant archeological area better.

== Sources ==
- Guglielmino, R. 2006. "Roca Vecchia (Lecce): New Evidence for Aegean Contacts with Apulia During the Late Bronze Age". Accordia Research Papers 10: 87–102.
- Pagliara, C. 2005. "Rocavecchia (Lecce): Il sito, le fortificazioni e l’abitato dell’età del Bronzo". In E. Greco & R. Laffineur (eds), Emporia: Aegeans in the Central and Eastern Mediterranean: Proceedings of the 10th International Aegean Conference/10e Rencontre Égéenne Internationale, Athens, Italian School of Archaeology, 14–18 April 2004. Aegaeum 25 (Liège, Belgium, and Austin, Texas: University of Liège, Histoire de l'art archéologie de la Grèce antique; University of Texas at Austin, Program in Aegean Scripts and Prehistory): 629–636.
- Pagliara, C. et al. 2007. "La sequenza cronostratigrafica delle fasi di occupazione dell’insediamento protostorico di Roca (Melendugno, Lecce). Relazione preliminare della campagna di scavo 2005 – Saggio X". Rivista di Scienze Preistoriche 57: 311–362.
- Pagliara, C. et al. 2008. "Roca Vecchia (Melendugno, Lecce), SAS IX: relazione stratigrafica preliminare sui livelli di occupazione protostorici (campagne di scavo 2005–2006)". Rivista di Scienze Preistoriche 58: 239–280.
- Scarano, T. 2012. Roca I. Le fortificazioni della media età del Bronzo. Foggia: Carlo Grenzi.
- Iacono, F. 2015. "Feasting at Roca: Cross-Cultural Encounters and Society in the Southern Adriatic during the Late Bronze Age". European Journal of Archaeology, 18 (2): 259–281.
