= Melendugno =

Comune di Melendugno
- Comune
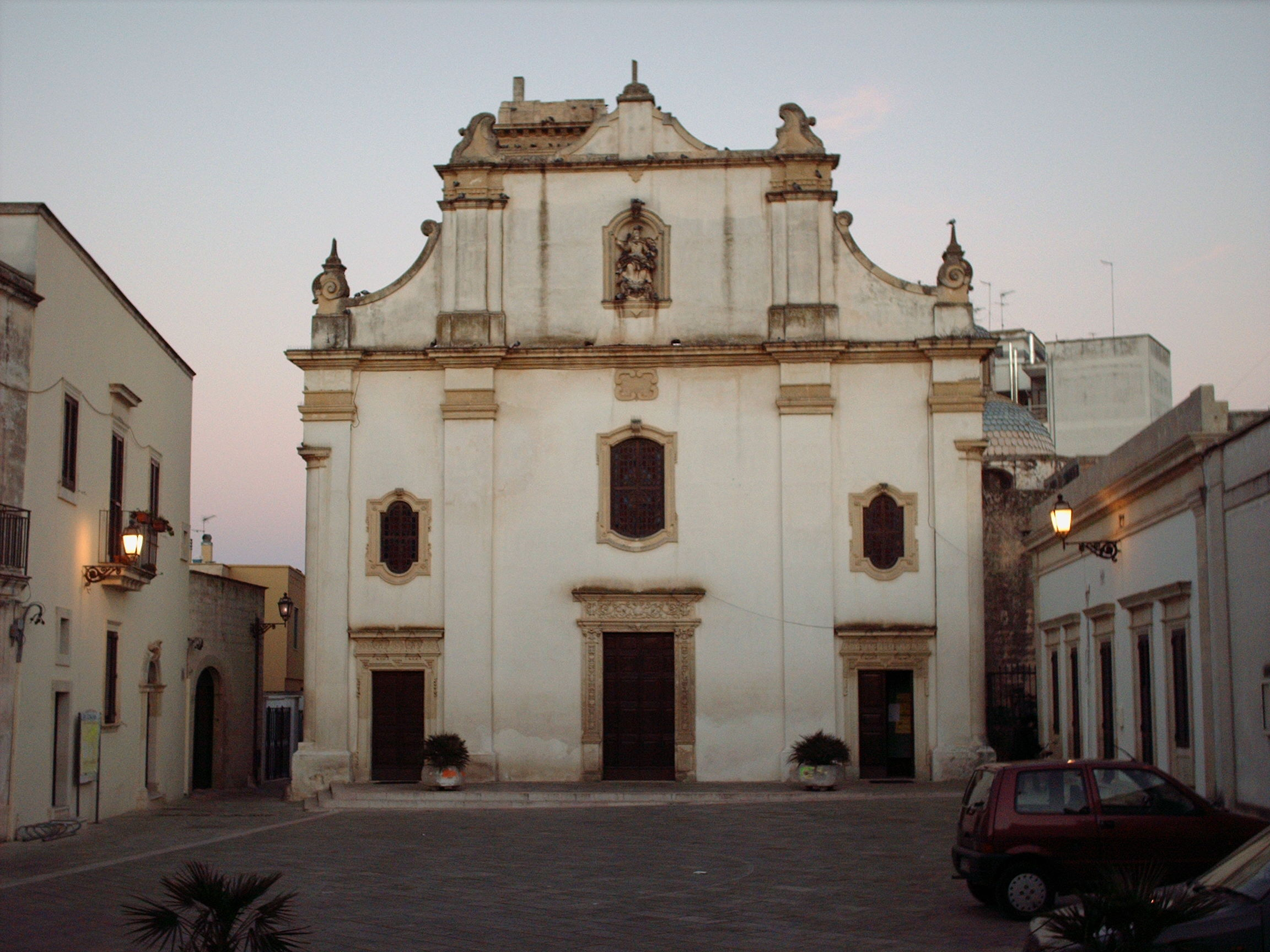

- Coat of arms

- Location within Italy Location within Apulia
- Coordinates: 40°16′N 18°20′E
- Country: Italy
- Region: Apulia
- Province: Lecce (LE)
- Frazioni: Borgagne, Roca Vecchia, San Foca, Torre dell'Orso, Torre Sant'Andrea, Torre Saracena Torre Specchia

Government
  - Mayor: Marco Potì

Area
  - Total: 92.31 km^{2} (35.64 sq mi)
- Elevation: 36 m (118 ft)

Population (31-8-2022)
  - Total: 10,034
  - Density: 108.7/km^{2} (281.5/sq mi)
- Demonym: Melendugnesi
- Time zone: UTC+1 (CET)
  - Summer (DST): UTC+2 (CEST)
- Postal code: 73026
- Dialing code: 0832
- ISTAT code: 075043
- Patron saint: St. Nicetas the Goth
- Saint day: Second Sunday in September
- Website: Official website

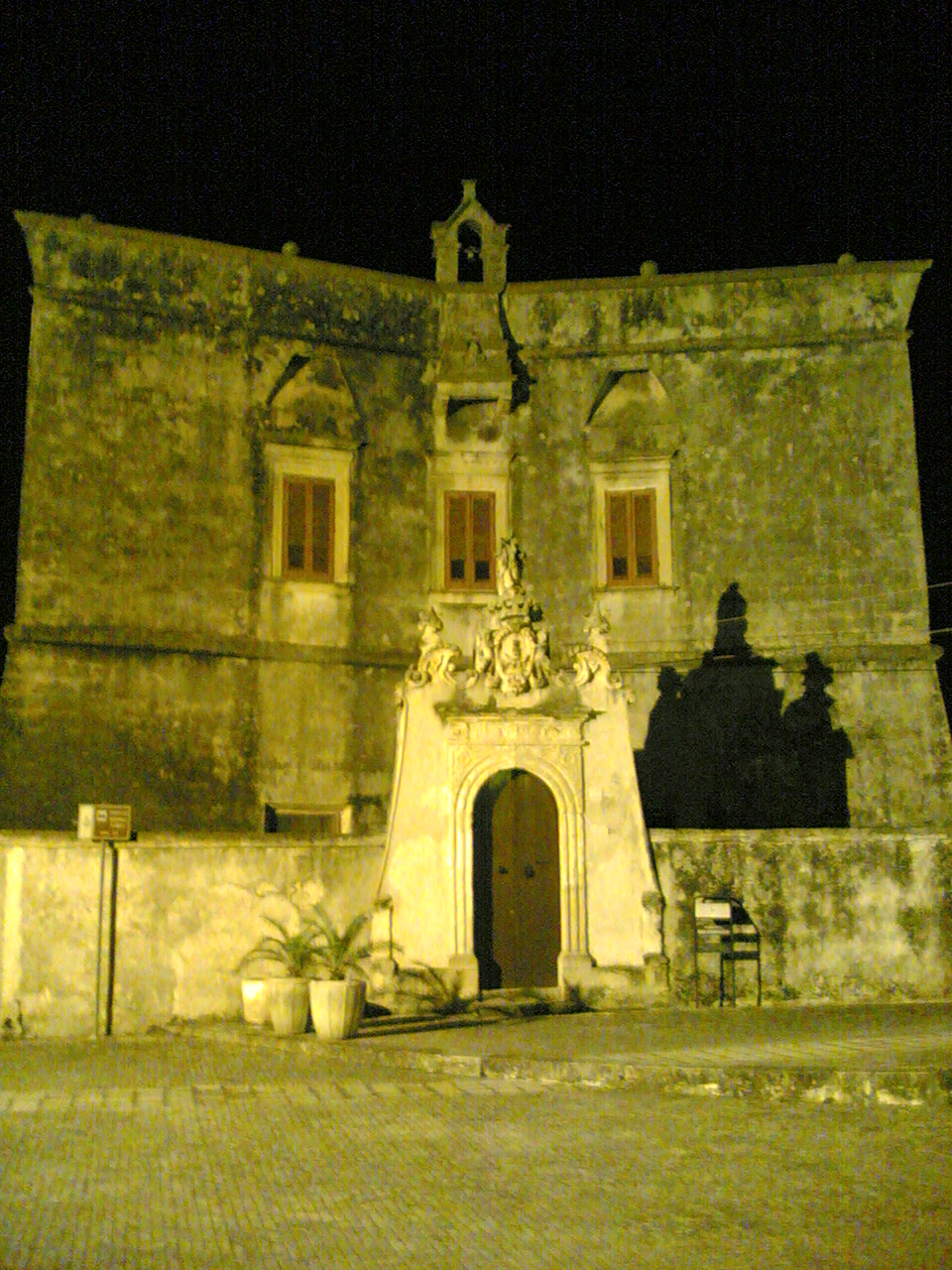
D'Amely baronial Palace.

Melendugno (Salentino: Melendugnu or Malandugnu) is a town and comune in the province of Lecce in the Apulia region of south-east Italy.

It is known for its marine, which are bathing beaches on the Adriatic Sea: Roca Vecchia, San Foca, Torre dell'Orso, and Torre Sant'Andrea, which were awarded the Blue Flag beach prize for the water quality. Melendugno also includes the frazione of Borgagne.

== See also ==
- Torre Sant'Andrea di Missipezza Lighthouse
