= Peucetians =

Ancient tribe in Apulia, Italy

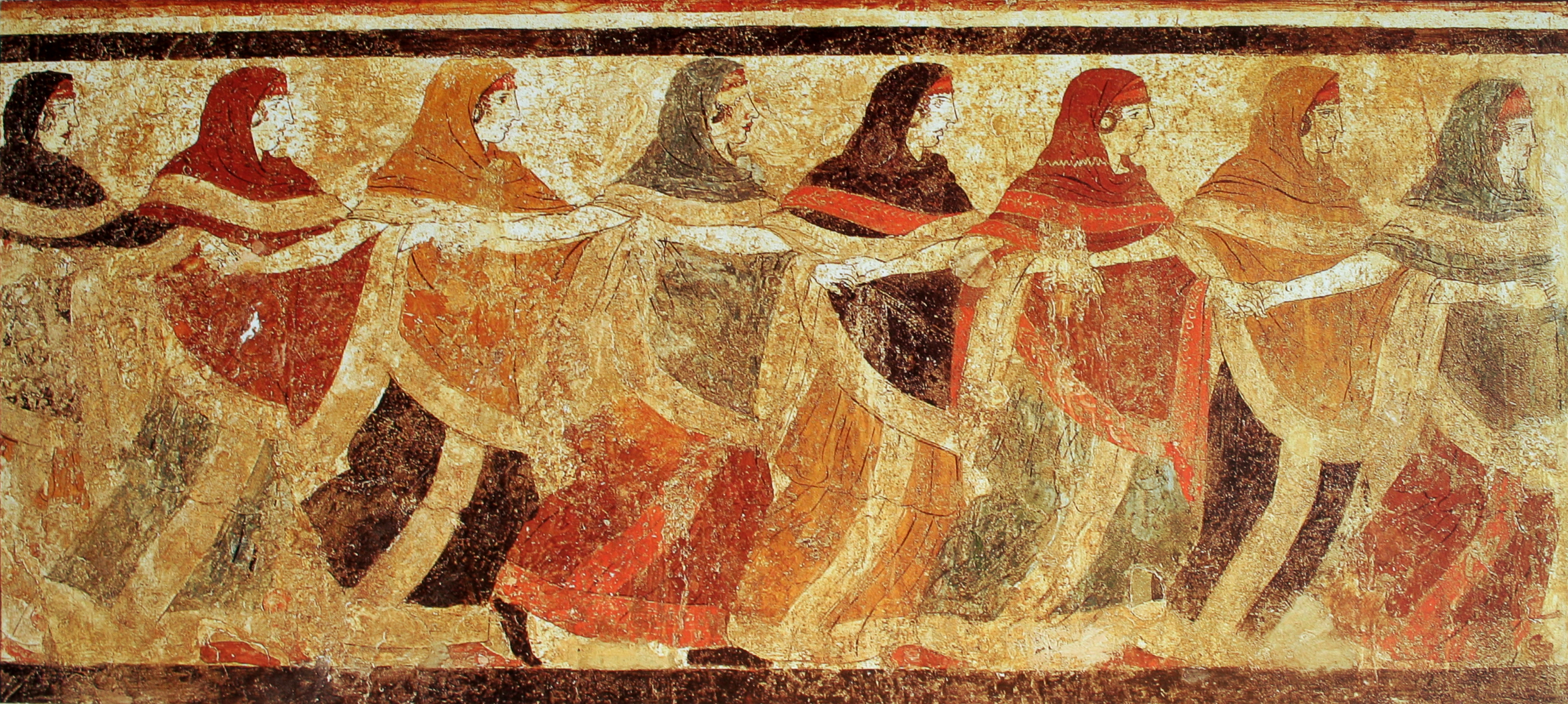
Fresco of dancing Peucetian women in the Tomb of the Dancers in Rubi (now Ruvo di Puglia), fifth or fourth century BC

The Peucetians were an Iapygian tribe which inhabited western and central Apulia in classical antiquity.

Two other Iapygian tribes, the Daunians and the Messapians, inhabited northern and southern Apulia respectively. All three tribes spoke the Messapian language, but had developed separate archaeological cultures by the seventh century BC; however, in Peucetian territory ancient Greek and Oscan language were spoken as well, as the legends of the currencies from Rubi and Azetium were trilingual. Peucetians lived in the eponymous region Peucetia, which was bordered by the Ofanto river and the Murge in the north, the Bradano river in the west and the territories of the Greek colony of Taras and the Messapians in the south. This region is mostly coincident with the Metropolitan City of Bari and parts of the provinces of Taranto and Barletta-Andria-Trani today.

== Name ==
The Encyclopédie under "Peuceti", distinguishes them from another ancient people, the Peucetioe who were living in Liburnia at the head of the Adriatic, with a reference to Callimachus, as quoted in Pliny (H.N. III.21) placing their country in Pliny's day as part of Illyria.

Modern ethnography regard the term 'Poedicli' as a synonym of 'Peucetii'. In Ancient Greek they were known as Πευκέτιοι.

== History ==
They had three important towns: Canosa, Silvium and Bitonto; the present capital of Apulia, Bari, had not much importance.

With increasing Hellenization their eponymous ancestor, given the name Peucetis, was said by Dionysius of Halicarnassus to have been the son of the Arcadian Lycaon and brother of Oenotrus. Lycaon having divided Arcadia among his twenty-two sons, Peucetios was inspired to seek better fortune abroad. This etiological myth is considered by modern writers to suggest strongly that, as far as the Greeks were concerned, the Peucetii were culturally part, though an unimportant part, of Magna Graecia.

Strabo places them to the north of the Calabri. Strabo adds (VI.8) "... the terms Peucetii and Daunii are not at all used by the native inhabitants except in the early times." In the time of Strabo the territory occupied by the former Peuceti lay on the mule-track that was the only connection between Brindisi and Benevento. Pre-Roman ceramic evidence justifies Strabo's classification of Daunii, Peucetii and Messapii, who were all speakers of the Messapian language. There were twelve tribal proto-statelets among the Peucetii, one of which is represented by modern Altamura.

=== Genetics ===
A genetic analysis of maternal haplogroups published in 2018 examined DNA extracted from 15 Iron Age (7th – 4th c. BCE) and 30 Roman period (1st – 4th c. CE) individuals buried at Iron Age Botromagno and Roman period Vagnari, now part of Gravina in Puglia. The study supports previous hypotheses that the ancestors of the Iron Age Iapygians may have originated in the eastern Balkan region, or derive shared ancestry with a common source population from eastern Europe, and suggests that as the Romans occupied the region, they populated their Imperial properties with people from central Italy (possibly from the region of Latium, and the surrounding environs of Rome).

== See also ==
- List of ancient Illyrian peoples and tribes
- Peucetian pottery
