= Bardhyl Çaushi =

- Born: 1936; Gjakova, Kingdom of Yugoslavia
- Died: 1999 (aged 62–63); Serbia, FR Yugoslavia
- Body discovered: 2005
- Known for: Abduction by Yugoslav forces and subsequent death
- Spouses: Human rights lawyer; Activist

Bardhyl Çaushi (Albanian: Bardhyl Çaushi, Serbian: Бардил Чауши, romanized: Bardil Čauši) (1936–1999) was a Kosovo Albanian human rights lawyer and activist. Highly active in cases of human rights abuses in Kosovo, Çaushi was the dean of the school of law of the University of Pristina and the first head of the Independent Jurists of Kosovo. During the NATO bombing of Yugoslavia he was abducted by Yugoslav forces and held in prisons in Serbia. Çaushi's state was unknown until 2005, when his remains were found and identified. His body was returned to Kosovo, where he was reburied with presidential honours. In 2017, he was honoured by the prime minister of the time Isa Mustafa and the leader of the Gjakova branch of the Democratic League of Kosova on the 27th anniversary of the creation of the Gjakova branch of the Democratic League of Kosovo for his sacrifices made for the party and country alongside others like Sylejman Sylejmani, Gjergj Sokoli, Mark Malota and sq:Urim Rexha.

== See also ==
- List of kidnappings
- Lists of solved missing person cases
- List of unsolved deaths
- Ukshin Hoti
