= William Robert Shepherd =

American cartographer and historian (1871–1934)

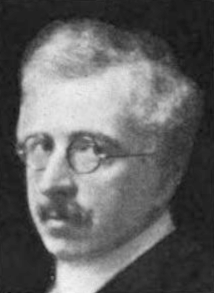
- Shepherd in 1926
- Born: June 12, 1871; Charleston, South Carolina, United States
- Died: June 7, 1934 (aged 62); Berlin, Germany
- Education: Columbia University (PhD)
- Occupations: Cartographer, historian

William Robert Shepherd (June 12, 1871 – June 7, 1934) was an American cartographer and historian specializing in American and Latin American history.

== Biography ==
William Robert Shepherd was born in Charleston, South Carolina on June 12, 1871.

In 1896, he completed his PhD at Columbia University. He then studied in Berlin and finally became professor of history at Columbia. He is best known for his Historical Atlas, published in several editions during the early twentieth century. He is considered a pioneer in the field of Latin American history. Shepherd's address to the 1909 meeting of the American Historical Association was "probably the first time that a part of the program of the annual meeting was devoted to the history of other peoples in the Americas." In his remarks, he decried that in the United States the history of the Western Hemisphere focuses on the English colonies and ignores or disparages the history of Spanish, Portuguese, and French America. He called for a more balanced history of the Americas, stressing "That the history of the Spanish, Portuguese, and the French in America possesses an interest and a significance of its own, entirely apart from its relation to the 'Anglo-American' element."

He died while on a lecture tour in Berlin on June 7, 1934.

== Selected works ==
The Battle of Harlem Heights (1898)

- Guide to the Materials for the History of the United States in Spanish Archives. Washington, D.C., Carnegie Institution of Washington, 1907.
- Distribution of Races in Austria-Hungary. 1911
- Historical Atlas. New York City, Henry Holt and Company, 1911.
- Latin America. New York, Henry Holt and Company, 1914.
- The Story of New Amsterdam. New York, The Holland Society of New York, 1917.
- The Hispanic Nations of the New World: Our Southern Neighbors. New Haven, Yale University Press, 1919.
- Hispanic Nations of the New World; a chronicle of our southern neighbors. New Haven, Yale University Press, 1921.
- Historical Atlas (Eighth ed.). Henry Holt. 1921.
- Historical Atlas. New York, Henry Holt and Company, 1926.
