= Teanum Apulum =

Teanum Apulum (Tiati in pre-Roman times or Civitate in imperial times) is an ancient town of Apulia, southeastern Italy, near the modern town of San Paolo di Civitate. It was located on the road between Larinum and Sipontum, at a crossing of the Fortore river, and was 18 miles (29 km) east of Larinum.

== History ==
The town was called Teate in pre-Roman times, as seen on its numerous ancient coins, which have Oscan legends. It submitted to Ancient Rome in 318 BC, when it was the primary town of Apulia. Afterwards, it became a municipium and was renamed Teanum Apulum.

Some ancient Roman ruins and an old bridge over the Fortore river still exist.
