= Taranto =

Taranto Tarde (Neapolitan) Tárantas (Greek)
- Comune
- Comune di Taranto
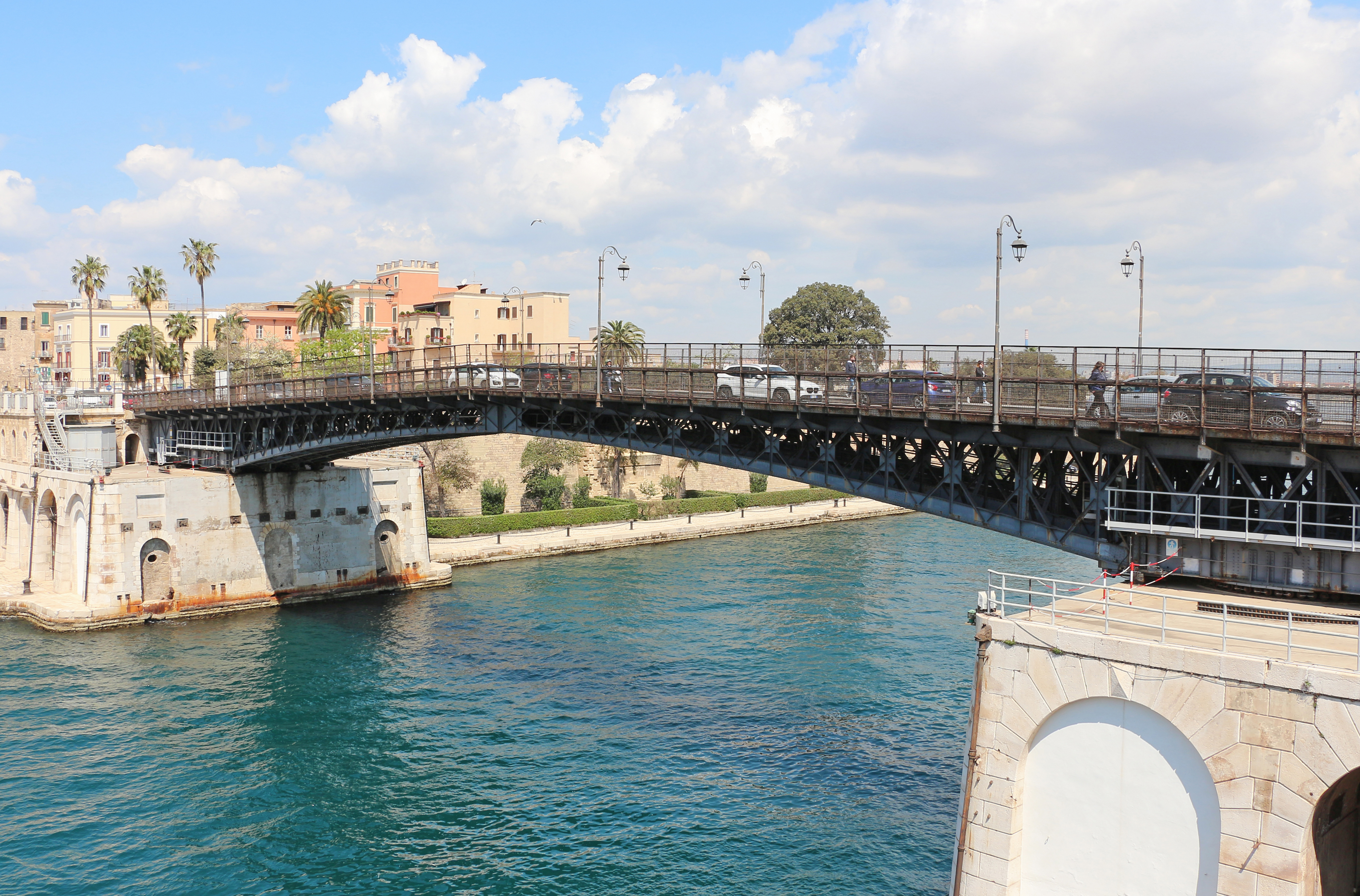
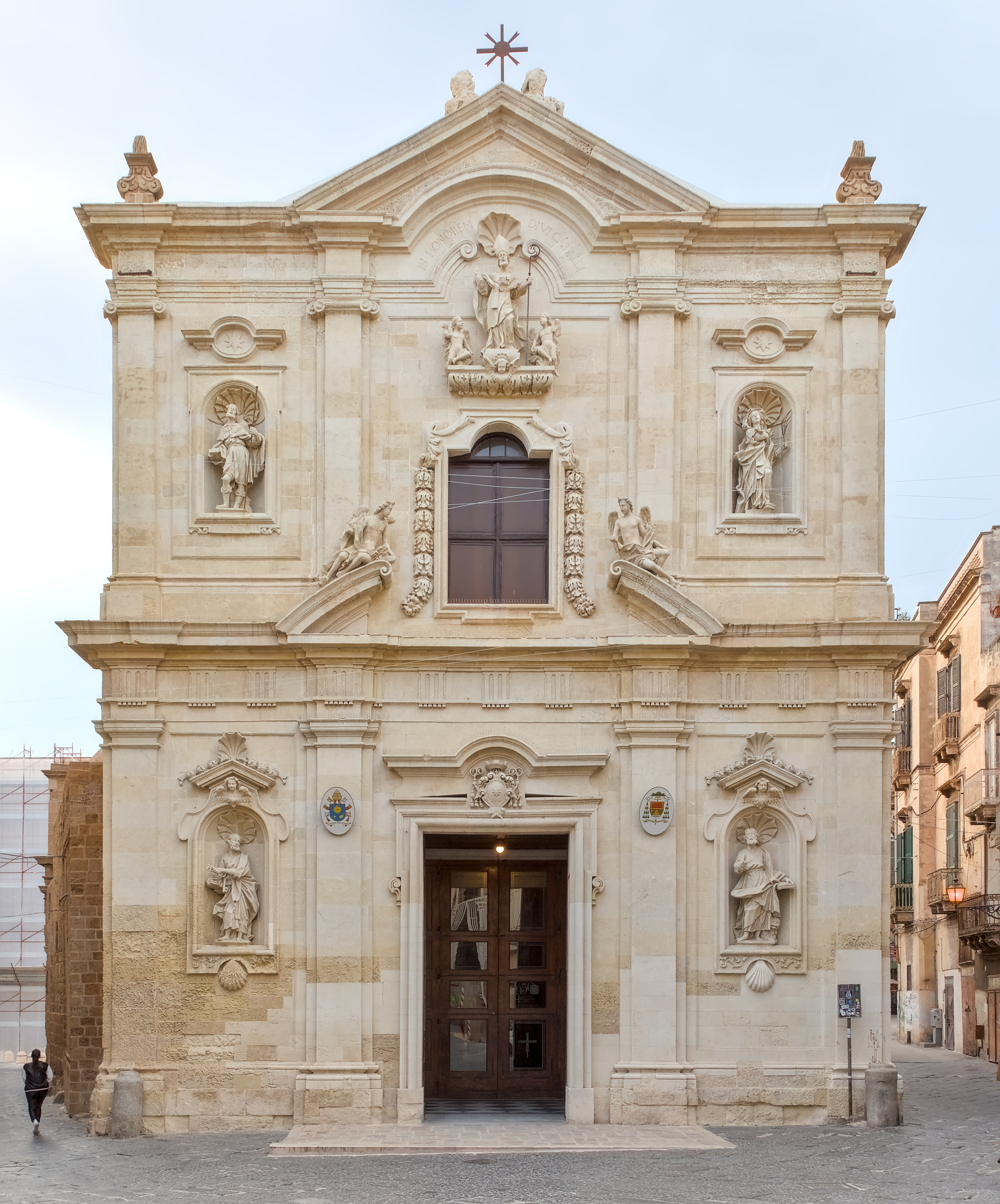
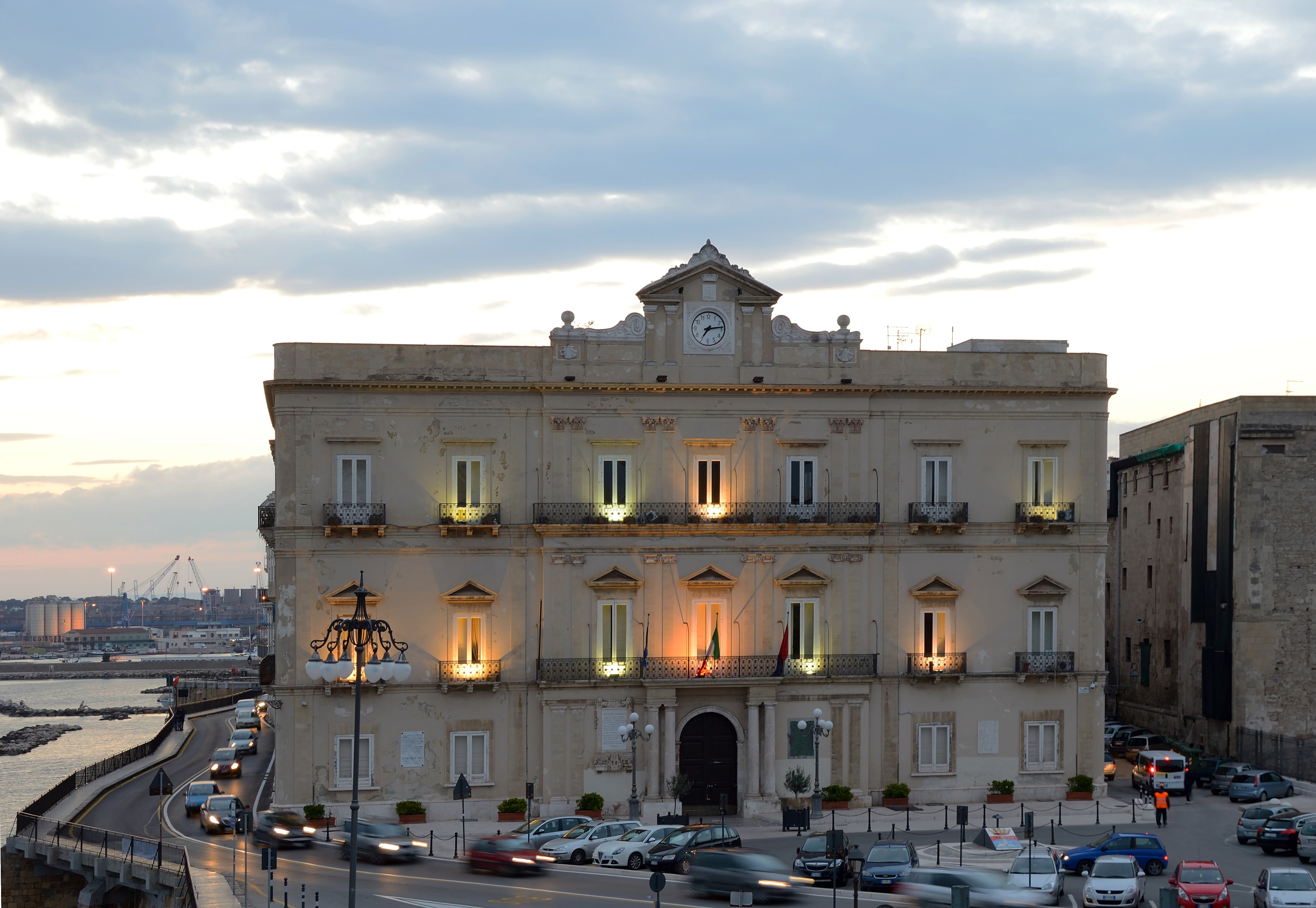
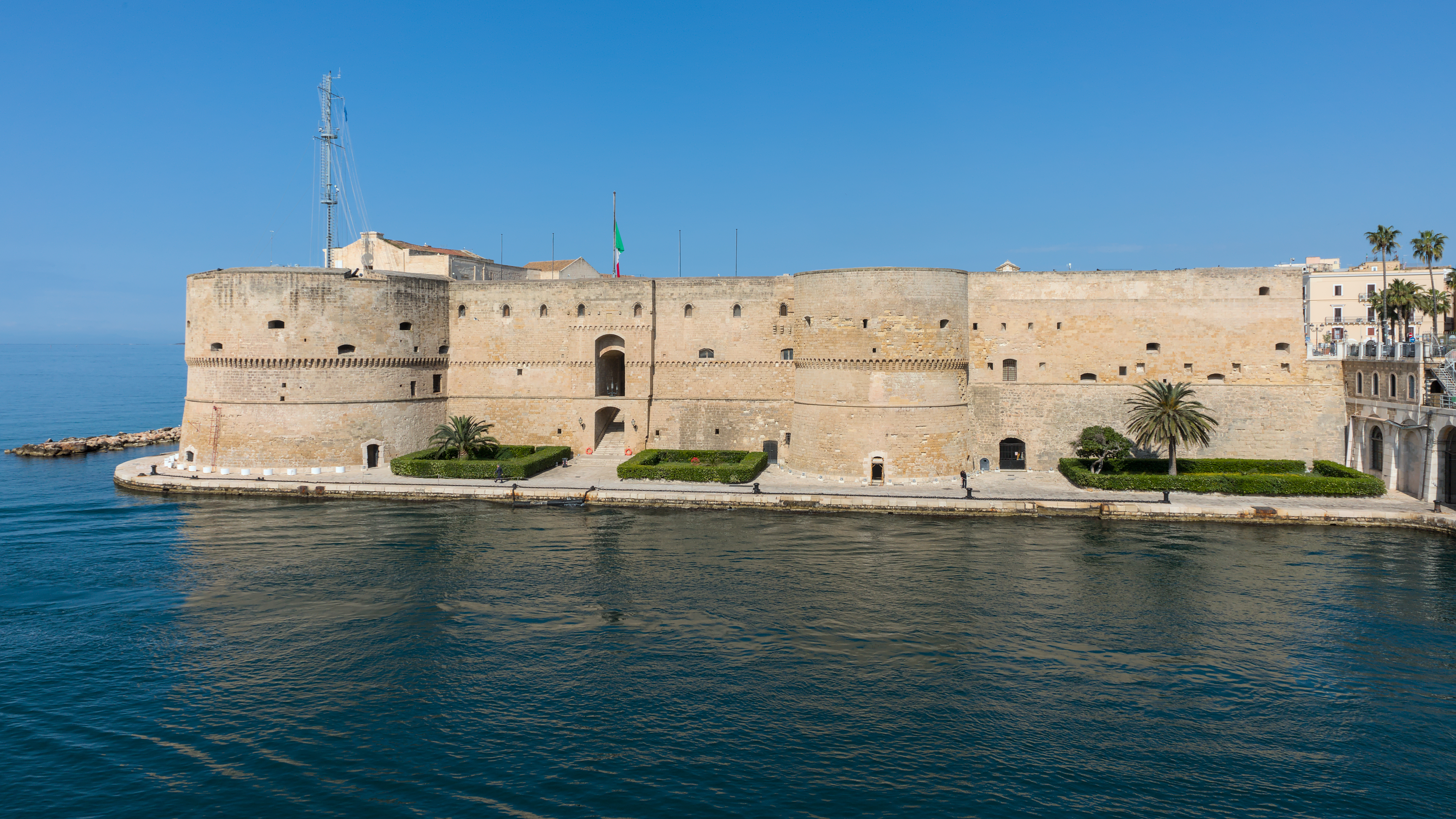
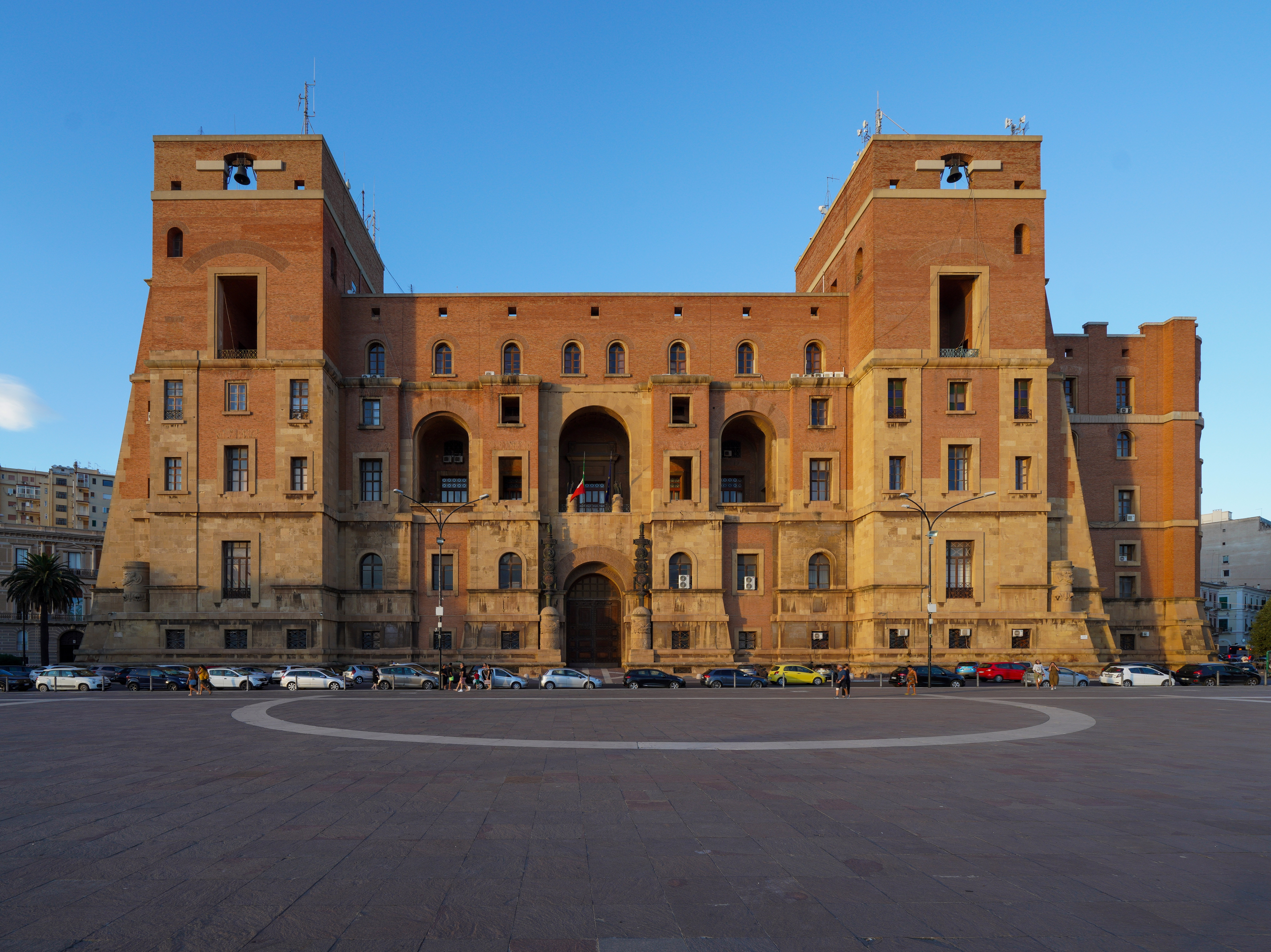
- From the top, left to right: San Francesco de Paola Bridge and the Taranto Cathedral; City hall and the Aragon Castle; and the Palace of Government

- Flag Coat of arms

- Location within Italy Location within Apulia
- Coordinates: 40°28′16″N 17°14′35″E
- Country: Italy
- Region: Apulia
- Province: Taranto (TA)
- Frazioni: Talsano, Lido Azzurro, Lama, San Vito, San Donato

Government
  - Mayor: Piero Bitetti

Area
  - Total: 249.86 km^{2} (96.47 sq mi)
- Highest elevation: 431 m (1,414 ft)
- Lowest elevation: 3 m (9.8 ft)

Population (2026)
  - Total: 185,112
  - Density: 740.86/km^{2} (1,918.8/sq mi)
- Demonyms: Tarantino; Tarentino
- Time zone: UTC+1 (CET)
  - Summer (DST): UTC+2 (CEST)
- Postal code: 74121, 74122, 74123
- Dialing code: (+39)099
- Patron saint: Saint Catald of Taranto
- Saint day: 10 May
- Website: Official website

UNESCO World Heritage Site
- Part of: Via Appia. Regina Viarum
- Criteria: Cultural: iii, iv, vi
- Reference: 1708-013
- Inscription: 2024 (46th Session)

Taranto (Italian: [ˈtaːranto]; Tarantino: Tarde), (Note: Old Italian: Tarento; Latin: Tarentum; Ancient Greek: Τάρᾱς, romanized: Tárās; Modern Greek: Τάραντας, romanized: Tárantas.) historically also called Tarent in English, is a coastal city in Apulia, Southern Italy on the Gulf of Taranto. It is the capital of the province of Taranto, serving as an important commercial port as well as the main base of the Italian navy. With a population of 185,112 as of 2026, Taranto is the second-largest city in Apulia.

Founded by Spartans in the 8th century BC during the period of Greek colonisation, Taranto was among the most important poleis in Magna Graecia, becoming a cultural, economic and military power that gave birth to philosophers, strategists, writers and athletes such as Archytas, Aristoxenus, Livius Andronicus, Heracleides, Iccus, Cleinias, Leonidas, Lysis and Sosibius. By 500 BC, the city was among the largest in the world, with an estimated population of up to 300,000. The seven-year rule of Archytas marked the apex of its development and recognition of its hegemony over other Greek colonies of southern Italy.

During the Norman period, it became the capital of the Principality of Taranto, which covered almost all of the heel of Apulia.

Taranto is now the third-largest continental city in southern Italy (south of Rome, roughly the southern half of the Italian peninsula), with well-developed steel and iron foundries, oil refineries, chemical works, naval shipyards and food-processing factories. Taranto was the host city of the 2026 Mediterranean Games.

The islets of S. Pietro and S. Paolo (St. Peter and St. Paul), collectively known as the Cheradi Islands, protect the bay, called Mar Grande (Big Sea), where the commercial port is located. Taranto is known for the large population of dolphins and other cetaceans living near these islands. Another bay, called Mar Piccolo (Little Sea), is formed by the peninsula of the old city and is a popular location for fishing and mussel farming.

== Etymology ==
The Greek colonists from Sparta called the city Taras (Τάρᾱς, gen. Τάραντος Tárantos) after the mythical hero Taras, while the Romans, who connected the city to Rome with an extension of the Appian Way, called it Tarentum.

== History ==
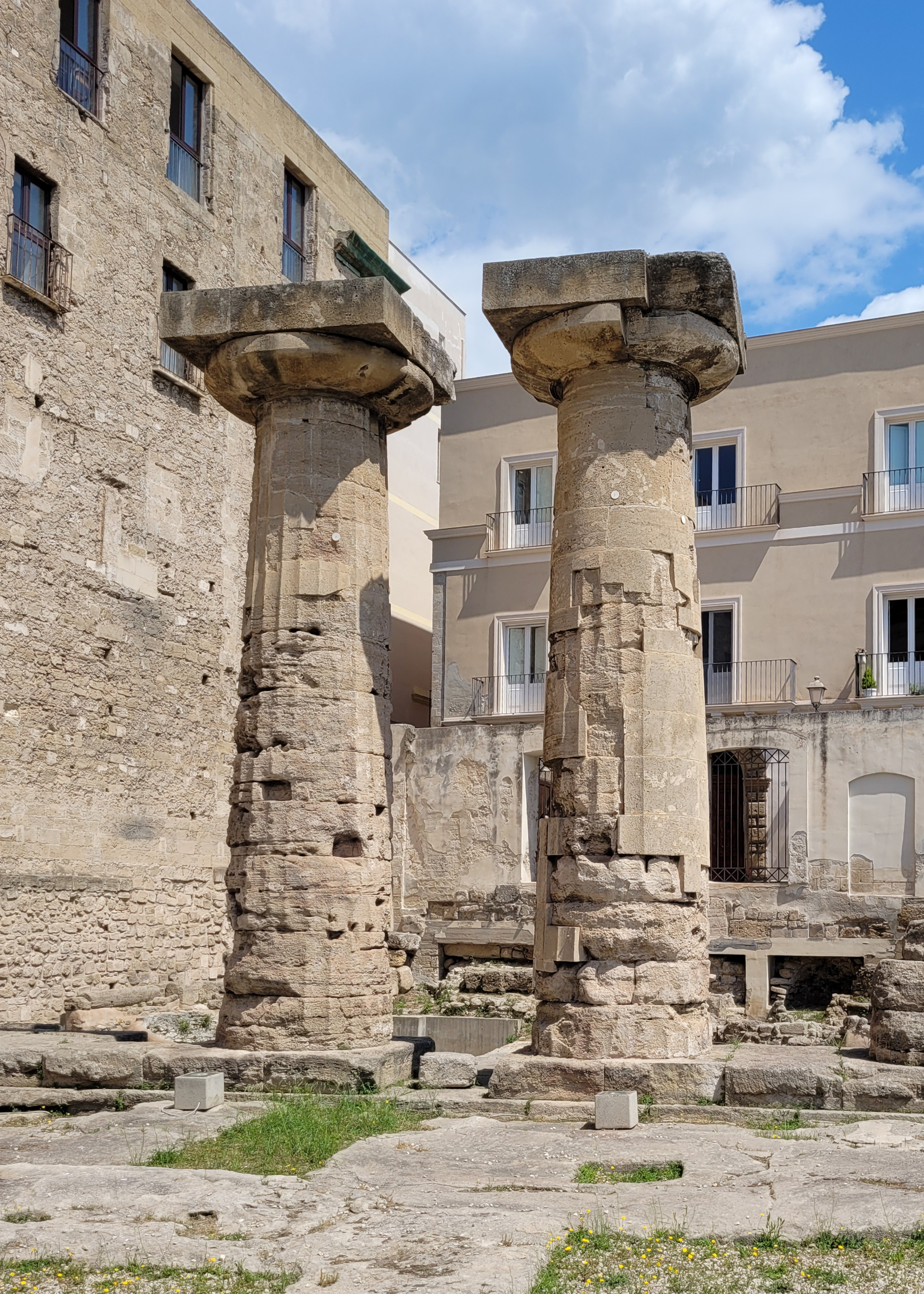
Doric columns from the Temple of Poseidon in Taranto, legacy of its Greek origins.

Taranto was founded in 706 BC by Dorian Greek immigrants hailing from Sparta. Its origin is peculiar: the founders were Partheniae ("sons of virgins"), sons of unmarried Spartan women and Perioeci (free men, but not citizens of Sparta); these out-of-wedlock unions were permitted extraordinarily by the Spartans to increase the prospective number of soldiers (only the citizens of Sparta could become soldiers) during the bloody Messenian Wars, but later they were retroactively nullified, and the sons were then obliged to leave Greece forever. Phalanthus, the Parthenian leader and founder (Oikistes), went to Delphi to consult the oracle: the puzzling answer designated the harbour of Taranto as the new home of the exiles. The Partheniae arrived in Apulia, and founded the city, naming it Taras after the son of the Greek sea god, Poseidon, and of a local nymph, Satyrion. According to other sources, Heracles founded the city. Another tradition indicates Taras as the founder of the city; the symbol of the Greek city (as well as of the modern city) depicts the legend of Taras being saved from a shipwreck by riding a dolphin that was sent to him by Poseidon. Taranto increased its power, becoming a commercial power and a sovereign city of Magna Graecia. Politically and militarily, Archytas appeared to have been the dominant figure in Tarentum in the first half of the 4th century, somewhat comparable to Pericles in Athens a half-century earlier. The Tarentines elected him strategos ("general") seven years in a row, a step that required them to violate their own rule against successive appointments. Archytas was allegedly undefeated as a general in Tarentine campaigns against their southern Italian neighbors.

In 303 BC, Sparta sent Cleonymus, the brother of king Areus I, commanding mercenary armies with official support in order to help Tarentum against Lucanians and the Roman Republic. Tarentum's power and independence came to an end as the Romans expanded throughout Italy. Taranto fought against Rome for the control of Southern Italy: it was helped by Pyrrhus, Molossian king of Greek Epirus, who surprised Rome with the use of war elephants in battle of Heraclea, a thing never seen before by the Romans. After the Pyrrhic victory at the battle of Asculum they lost the battle of Beneventum in 275 BC. Tarentum surrendered to Rome after the death of Pyrrhus in Peloponnese in 272 BC. This subsequently cut off Taranto from the centre of Mediterranean trade, by connecting the Via Appia directly to the port of Brundisium (Brindisi).

=== Ancient art ===
Like many Greek city states, Taras issued its own coins in the 5th and 4th centuries BC. The denomination was a Nomos, a die-cast silver coin whose weight, size and purity were controlled by the state. The highly artistic coins presented the symbol of the city, Taras being saved by a dolphin, with the reverse side showing the likeness of a hippocamp, a horse-fish amalgam which is depicted in mythology as the beast that drew Poseidon's chariot.

Taras was also the centre of a thriving decorated Greek pottery industry during the 4th century BC. Most of the South Italian Greek vessels known as Basilican ware were made in different workshops in the city.

Unfortunately, none of the names of the artists have survived, so modern scholars have been obliged to give the recognizable artistic hands and workshops nicknames based on the subject matter of their works, museums which possess the works, or individuals who have distinguished the works from others. Some of the most famous of the Apulian vase painters at Taras are now called: the Iliupersis Painter, the Lycurgus Painter, the Gioia del Colle Painter, the Darius Painter, the Underworld Painter, and the White Sakkos Painter, among others.

The wares produced by these workshops were usually large elaborate vessels intended for mortuary use. The forms produced included volute kraters, loutrophoroi, paterai, oinochoai, lekythoi, fish plates, etc. The decoration of these vessels was red figure (with figures reserved in red clay fabric, while the background was covered in a black gloss), with overpainting (sovradipinto) in white, pink, yellow, and maroon slips.

Often the style of the drawings is florid and frilly, as was already the fashion in 4th-century Athens. Distinctive South Italian features also begin to appear. Many figures are shown seated on rocks. Floral motifs become very ornate, including spiraling vines and leaves, roses, lilies, poppies, sprays of laurel, acanthus leaves. Often the subject matter consists of naiskos scenes (scenes showing the statue of a deceased person in a naos, a miniature temple or shrine). Most often the naiskos scene occupies one side of the vase, while a mythological scene occupies the other. Images depicting many of the Greek myths are only known from South Italian vases, since Athenian ones seem to have had more limited repertoires of depiction.

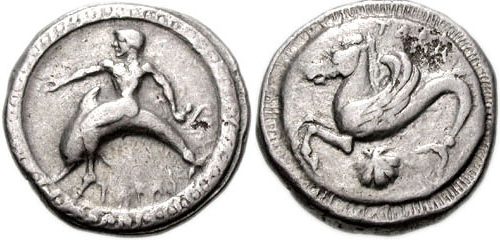
Ancient coin from Taranto, with the eponymous hero Taras riding a dolphin

=== World War II ===
The Battle of Taranto took place on the night of 11–12 November 1940 during the Second World War between British naval forces, under Admiral Andrew Cunningham, and Italian naval forces, under Admiral Inigo Campioni. The Royal Navy launched the first all-aircraft ship-to-ship naval attack in history, employing 21 Fairey Swordfish biplane torpedo bombers from the aircraft carrier HMS Illustrious in the Mediterranean Sea. The attack struck the battle fleet of the Regia Marina at anchor in the harbour of Taranto, using aerial torpedoes despite the shallowness of the water.

=== The Taranto Prize (Premio Taranto) ===
The Taranto Prize, defined as the "Biennial of the South", was a biennial cultural event that took place between 1947 and 1951. It was born on the initiative of thirty-year-old veterans who, returning from the Second World War, gathered in the «Cultural Club (Circolo della cultura)» and the newspaper 'Voce del Popolo'. The coordinator, Antonio Rizzo, was a physicist who graduated with Enrico Fermi. He intended to promote a new cultural impulse of a pacifist nature for the city. The event was structured into two sections: literature and painting. Several artists of international calibre, such as Pier Paolo Pasolini, Carlo Emilio Gadda, and Giorgio de Chirico, participated. The theme of the competition was the sea.

=== 2006 municipal bankruptcy ===
The Municipality of Taranto was declared bankrupt effective 31 December 2005, having accrued liabilities of €357 million. This was one of the biggest financial crises that has ever hit a municipality.

The bankruptcy declaration was made on 18 October 2006 by the receiver Tommaso Blonda. He was appointed following the resignation of the mayor, Rossana Di Bello, on account of her sixteen-month prison sentence for abuse of office and forgery of documents relating to investigations into the contract for the management of the city incinerator, awarded to Termomeccanica.

== Geography ==
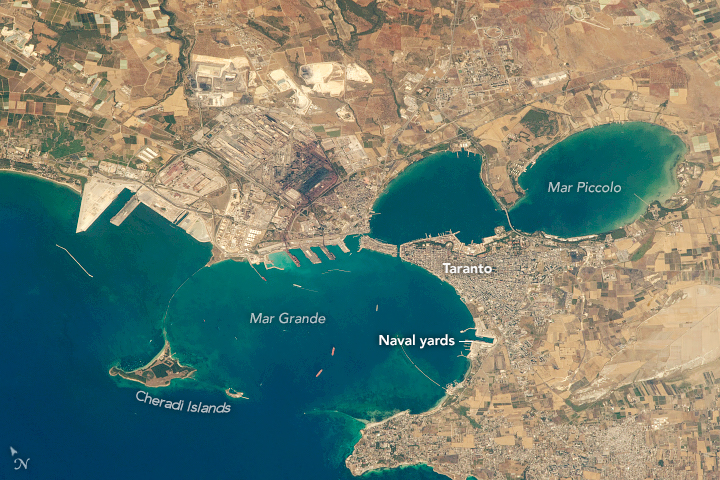
Taranto and harbor from ISS, 2017

Taranto faces the Ionian Sea. It is 14.5 m (48 ft) above sea level. It was built on a plain running north/north-west–southeast, and surrounded by the Murgia plateau from the north-west to the east. Its territory extends for 209.64 km^{2} (80.94 sq mi) and is mostly underwater. It is characterised by three natural peninsulas and a man-made island, formed by digging a ditch during the construction of Aragon Castle. The city is known as the "city of two seas" because it is washed by the Big Sea in the bay between Punta Rondinella to the northwest and Capo San Dante to the south, and by the vast reservoir of the Little Sea.

=== Big Sea and Little Sea ===
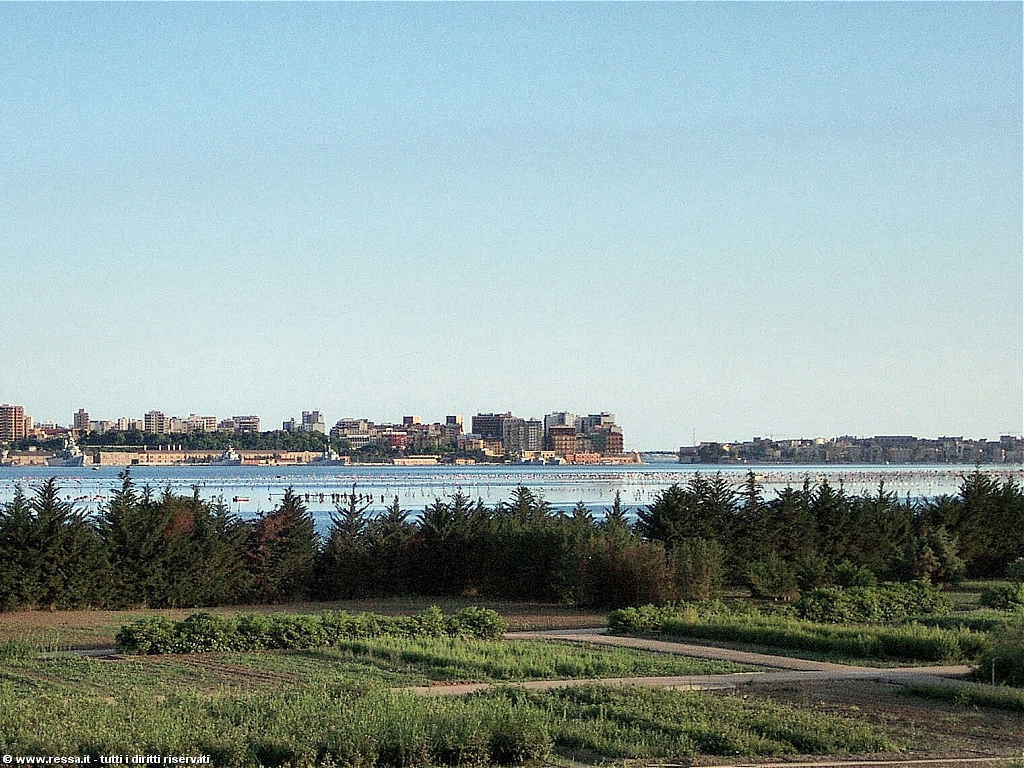
The view of the Little Sea from the Appian Way

The Big Sea (or "Mare Grande") is frequently known as the Big Sea bay as that is where ships harbour. It is separated from the Little Sea (or "Mare Piccolo") by a cape which closes the gulf, leading to the artificial island. This island formed the heart of the original city and it is connected to the mainland by the Ponte di Porta Napoli and the Ponte Girevole. The Big Sea is separated from the Ionian Sea by the Capo San Vito, the Isole Cheradi of St Peter and St Paul, and the three islands of San Nicolicchio, which are completely incorporated by the ILVA steelworks. The latter form a little archipelago which closes off the arc creating the natural Big Sea bay.

The Little Sea is considered to be a lagoon so it presents problems of water exchange. It is virtually divided into two by the Ponte Punta Penna Pizzone, which joins the Punta Penna to the Punta Pizzone. The first of these forms a rough triangle, whose corners are the opening to the east and the Porta Napoli channel linking it to the Big Sea in the west. The second half forms an ellipse whose major axis measures almost 5 kilometres (3 mi) from the south-west to the north-east. The Galeso river flows into the first half.

The two water bodies have slightly different winds and tides and their underwater springs have different salinities. These affect the currents on the surface and in the depths of the Big Sea and the two halves of the Little Sea. In the Big Sea and in the northern part of the Little Sea, there are some underwater springs called citri, which carry undrinkable freshwater together with salt water. This creates the ideal biological conditions for cultivating Mediterranean mussels, known locally as cozze.

=== Climate ===
The climate of the city, recorded by the weather station situated near the Grottaglie Military Airport, is a hot-summer Mediterranean climate, typical of the Mediterranean with frequent continental features.

The spring is usually mild and rainy, but it is not uncommon to have sudden cold spells from the north and east, which often cause snowfall. Average annual precipitation is fairly low (even for southern Italy), measuring just 425 mm (16.7 in) per year.

The summer is hot and humid, with temperatures averaging 29 °C (84 °F).

On 28 November 2012 a large F3 tornado hit the port of Taranto and damaged the Taranto Steel Mill; about 20 workers were injured and another man was reported missing.

Climate data for Taranto (1981–2010 normals, extremes 1943–present)
Month	Jan	Feb	Mar	Apr	May	Jun	Jul	Aug	Sep	Oct	Nov	Dec	Year
Record high °C (°F)	20.0 (68.0)	21.0 (69.8)	28.0 (82.4)	29.0 (84.2)	34.0 (93.2)	40.8 (105.4)	43.0 (109.4)	42.0 (107.6)	39.0 (102.2)	32.2 (90.0)	26.4 (79.5)	23.0 (73.4)	43.0 (109.4)
Mean daily maximum °C (°F)	12.9 (55.2)	13.1 (55.6)	15.2 (59.4)	18.1 (64.6)	23.1 (73.6)	27.5 (81.5)	30.8 (87.4)	30.7 (87.3)	26.5 (79.7)	22.2 (72.0)	17.3 (63.1)	13.8 (56.8)	20.9 (69.7)
Daily mean °C (°F)	9.1 (48.4)	9.1 (48.4)	11.2 (52.2)	13.9 (57.0)	18.7 (65.7)	22.7 (72.9)	25.9 (78.6)	25.9 (78.6)	22.0 (71.6)	18.2 (64.8)	13.6 (56.5)	10.2 (50.4)	16.7 (62.1)
Mean daily minimum °C (°F)	5.3 (41.5)	5.2 (41.4)	7.3 (45.1)	9.8 (49.6)	14.2 (57.6)	18.0 (64.4)	20.9 (69.6)	21.0 (69.8)	17.5 (63.5)	14.2 (57.6)	9.9 (49.8)	6.7 (44.1)	12.5 (54.5)
Record low °C (°F)	−10.0 (14.0)	−5.0 (23.0)	−6.4 (20.5)	−2.4 (27.7)	2.0 (35.6)	7.4 (45.3)	8.8 (47.8)	10.2 (50.4)	6.4 (43.5)	1.0 (33.8)	−3.0 (26.6)	−4.8 (23.4)	−10.0 (14.0)
Average precipitation mm (inches)	60.5 (2.38)	45.9 (1.81)	53.4 (2.10)	44.1 (1.74)	26.1 (1.03)	19.3 (0.76)	18.6 (0.73)	20.9 (0.82)	53.8 (2.12)	73.3 (2.89)	75.9 (2.99)	65.0 (2.56)	556.8 (21.93)
Average precipitation days (≥ 1.0 mm)	6.9	5.8	6.2	5.8	4.3	2.7	1.5	2.2	4.8	6.2	6.5	7.5	60.4
Average relative humidity (%)	78	75	73	71	68	63	61	63	66	73	77	80	71
Mean monthly sunshine hours	126	131	156	221	284	316	341	327	246	197	140	110	2,595
Source 1: Istituto Superiore per la Protezione e la Ricerca Ambientale (precipitation 1991–2020)
Source 2: Danish Meteorological Institute (sun 1931–1960) Servizio Meteorologico (humidity 1961–1990 and extremes recorded at Taranto-Grottaglie Airport)

It is classified as Geographical zone C and having a degree-day of 30.

== Demographics ==
Historical population
Year	Pop.	±%
1861	26,163	—
1871	25,012	−4.4%
1881	31,630	+26.5%
1901	56,190	+77.6%
1911	65,238	+16.1%
1921	104,379	+60.0%
1931	111,616	+6.9%
1936	117,722	+5.5%
1951	163,415	+38.8%
1961	189,163	+15.8%
1971	221,111	+16.9%
1981	233,496	+5.6%
1991	217,809	−6.7%
2001	202,033	−7.2%
2011	200,154	−0.9%
2021	189,461	−5.3%
Source: ISTAT

As of 2026, the population is 185,112, of which 48.2% are males, and 51.8% are females. Minors make up 14.0% of the population, and seniors make up 27.2%.

=== Dialect ===
The city is the centre of the Tarantino dialect (dialètte tarandíne) of the Neapolitan language. As a result of the city's history, it is influenced by Greek, Vulgar Latin, French and many others.

=== Immigration ===
As of 2025, immigrants make up 4.1% of the population. The 5 largest foreign countries of birth are Romania, Nigeria, Bangladesh, Ukraine, and Sri Lanka.

== Sights ==
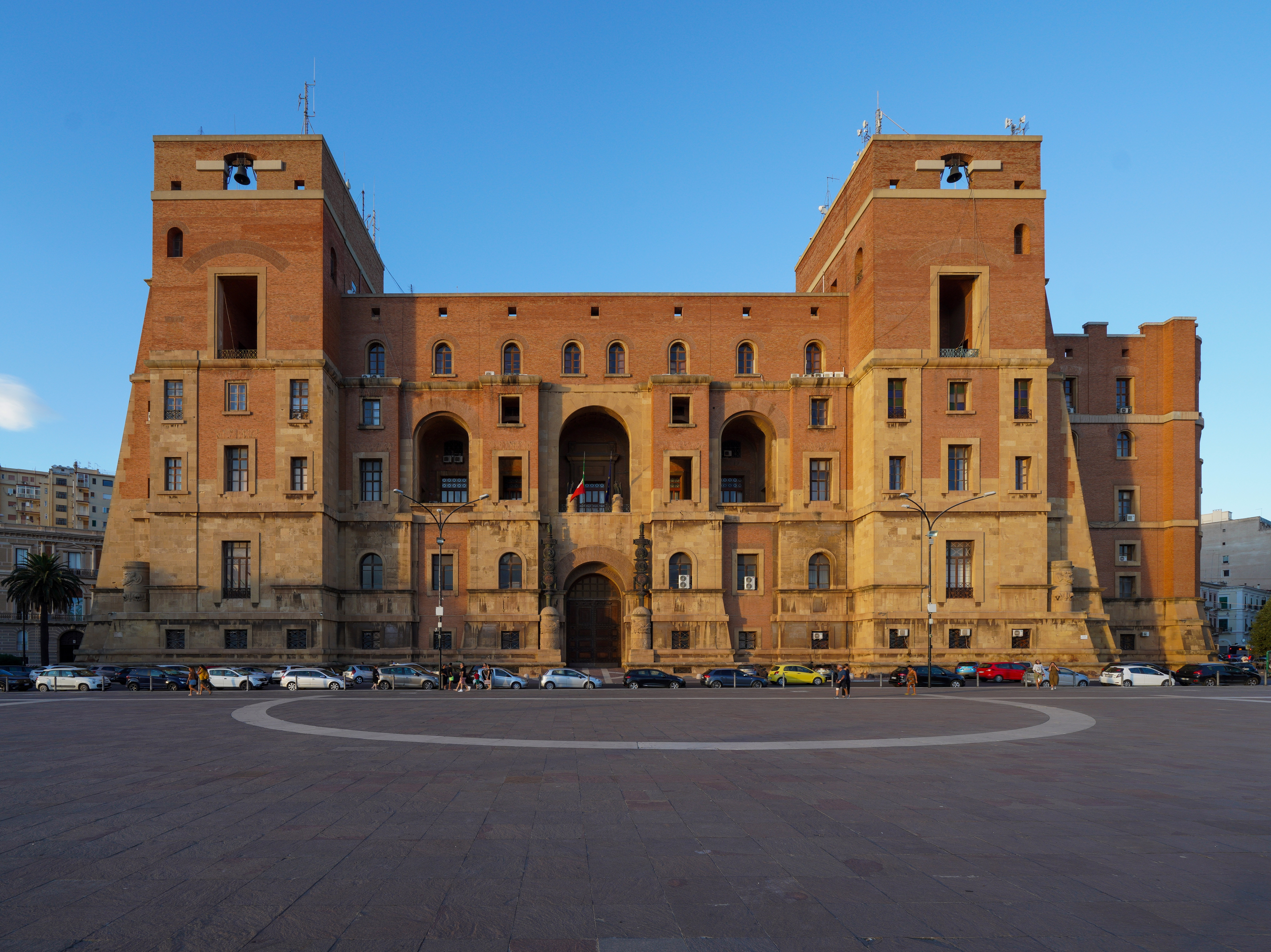
Palazzo del Governo facing the Lungomare, which was inaugurated in 1934 by Benito Mussolini

Taranto has a number of sites of historic value. Situated at the angle of the canal, Big Sea and Piazza Castello, the Aragon Castle was built between 1486 and 1492 by orders of King Ferdinand II of Aragon to protect the city from the Turks' frequent raids. The castle, which was designed by Italian painter and architect Francesco di Giorgio Martini, replaced a pre-existing 9th-century Byzantine fortress, which was deemed unfit for 15th-century warfare. In 1707 it ceased to be used as a military fortress and was converted to a prison until under Napoleon Bonaparte it reverted to its original military function. To date it is the property of the Italian Navy and is open to the public. Twenty-first-century excavations revealed the castle's earlier Byzantine foundations which can be viewed.

There are several Greek temple ruins - some from the 6th century BC - such as the remains of a temple dedicated to Poseidon, with its two surviving Doric columns still visible on Piazza Castello in the Città Vecchia.

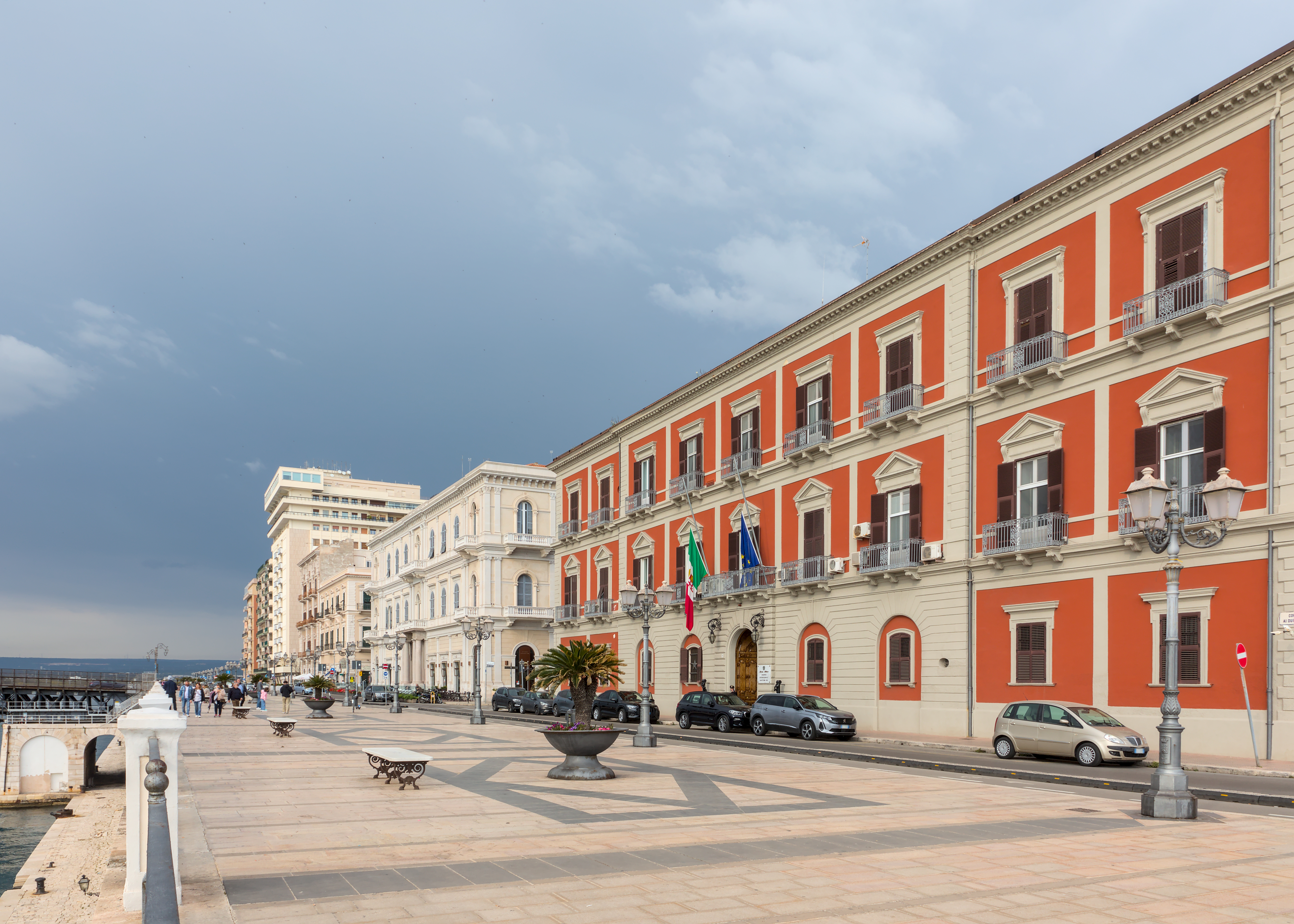
The Corso Due Mari, facing the Old town.

The Promenade (lungomare), named after former Italian king Victor Emmanuel III, overlooks the Mar Grande, the natural harbour and commercial port.

The Concattedrale Gran Madre di Dio, designed by Gio Ponti, was built in 1967–1971 in reinforced concrete and is one of the most significant late works by the architect. In 2018 it is in poor condition and defaced by graffiti.

In the modern districts, but above all in the central Borgo Umbertino, there are also the Fountain of the Rosa dei Venti, Monumento al Marinaio, the War Memorial and the Navy Yard, another symbol of the city, some archeological sites such as the Cripta del Redentore, churches like Maria Santissima del Monte Carmelo, San Pasquale and San Francesco di Paola and 18th- and 19th-century palaces such as Palazzo Magnini, Palazzo delle Poste, Palazzo del Governo, Palazzo degli Uffici and Palazzo Savino D'Amelio.

On the outskirts and in the countryside there are several traditional ancient country houses called masseria, like Masseria Capitignano.

=== Old city ===
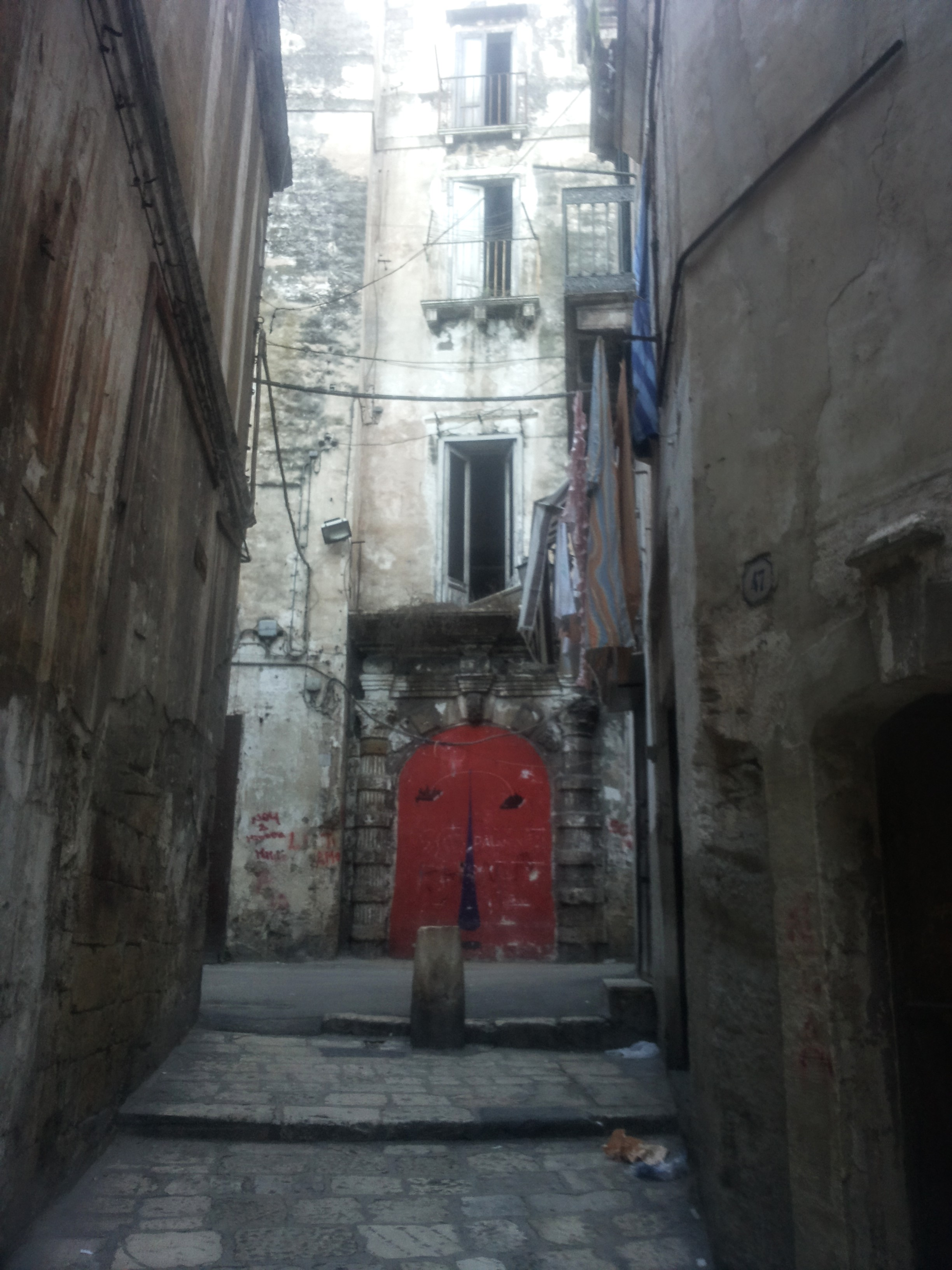
Via Cava in Old City. The painted red arched door of the old, multi-storied palazzo is an example of the street art that since 2013 became a feature of Old City

The Old City or Città Vecchia is where the Greeks built their acropolis. Today it retains the same street layout of 967, when the Byzantines under Nicephorus Phocas rebuilt what the Saracen troops led by the Slavic Sabir had razed to the ground in 927 AD. There are four main arteries (Corso Vittorio II, Via Duomo, Via di Mezzo and Via Garibaldi) which run in a straight direction however the side streets were purposely built narrow and winding to impede the passage of an invading army.

Incorporating the Aragon Castle, Doric Columns, City Hall, Clock Tower and Piazza Fontana, it is situated and entirely enclosed on the artificial island between the Big and Little Seas and is reached from the New City by crossing the Ponte Girevole (swing bridge) from the south and the Ponte di Porta Napoli from the north. Almost rectangular in shape, it is divided into four pittaggi (quarters) that are delineated by the cross formed between Via di Mezzo and postilier Via Nuova. These are "Baglio" and "San Pietro" in the upper section which face the Big Sea; and "Turipenne" and "Ponte" in the lower part fronting the Little Sea. The nobility, clergy and military personnel made their homes in Baglio and San Pietro, whilst the artisans and fishermen dwelled in Ponte and Turipenne. An Armenian community was present in the 10th and 11th centuries having arrived in Taranto as troops in the Byzantine Army. The San't Andrea degli Armeni church in Piazza Monteoliveto, located in the Baglio quarter, stands as testimony to the neighbourhood where the Armenians made their homes.

In 1746 the entire population of Taranto resided in Old City. This resulted in the necessity of building additional stories on the narrow houses. It is still inhabited with a number of people living in juxtaposition to the old palazzi. By 2013 the population of the Old City was just 1000 at a time when the wider city had more than 200,000 inhabitants.

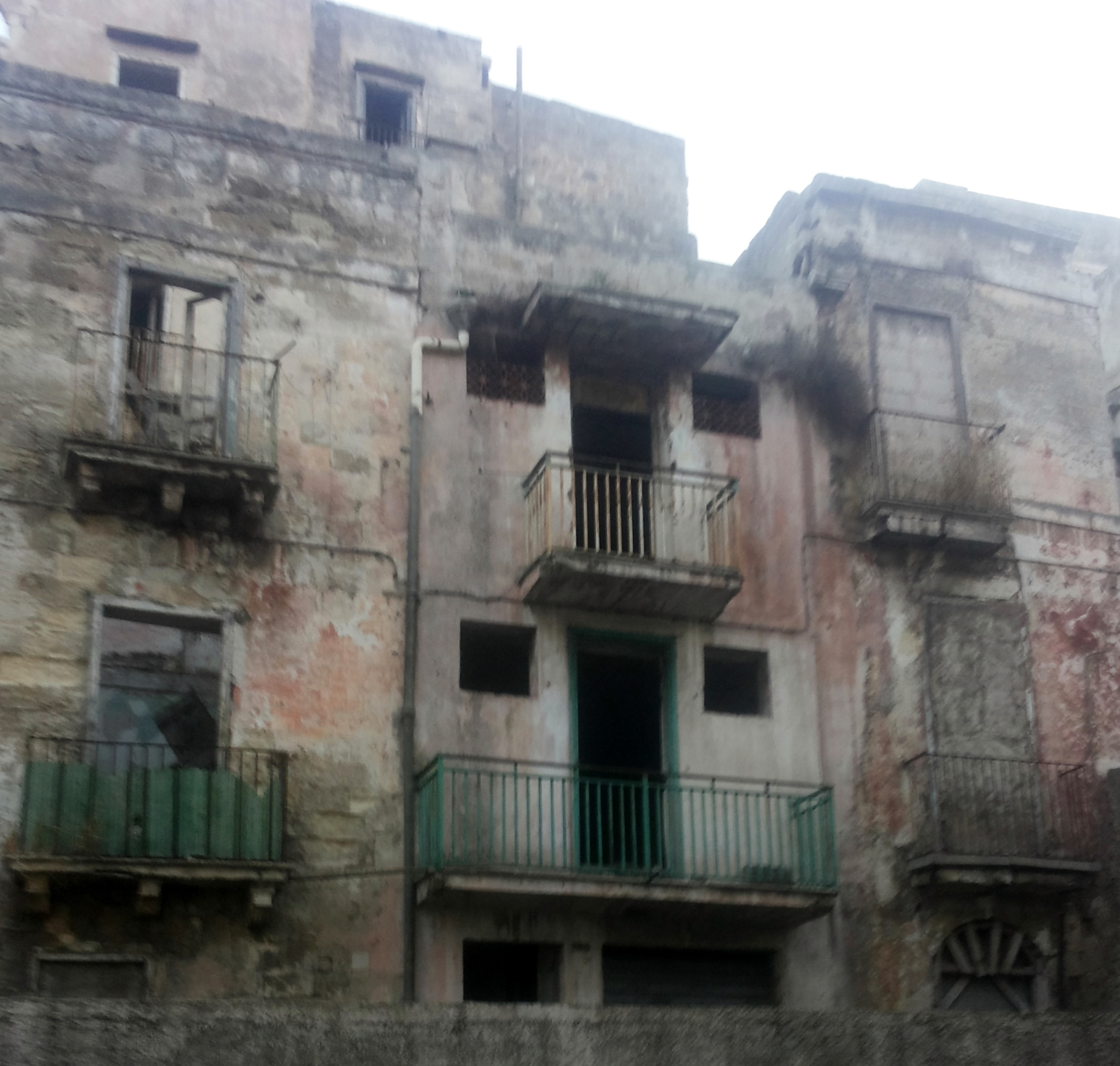
Old derelict buildings in Via di Mezzo which forms the cross that divides the four pittagi

There are a number of 17th and 18th-century palazzi in Old City. For years, they served as the main residence of local aristocratic families and the clergy. These include Palazzo Calò, Palazzo Carducci-Artenisio (1650), Palazzo Galeota (1728), Palazzo Gallo (17th century), Palazzo Latagliata, Palazzo Lo Jucco (1793), Palazzo D'Aquino, Palazzo Delli Ponti, Palazzo Gennarini, Palazzo d'Ayala, Palazzo Visconti, Palazzo Galizia, Palazzo Ciura and Palazzo Pantaleo. The 17th century de Beaumont-Bonelli-Bellacicco palace houses the Spartan Museum of Taranto - Hypogeum Bellacicco which extends below street and sea level to the hypogeum that is a crossroads with other hypogeum of Old City which together form the system of subterranean Taranto.

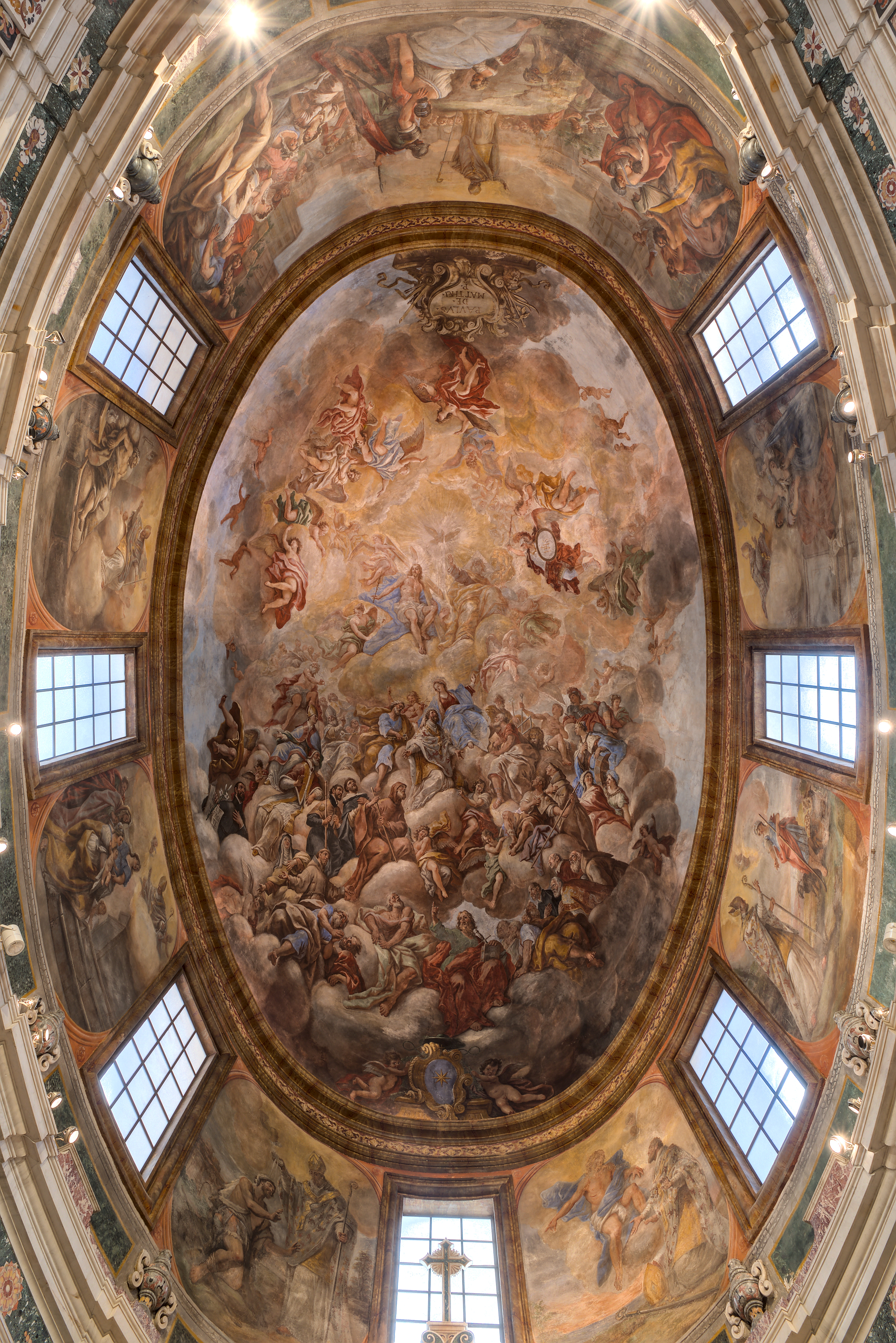
Ceiling of the San Cataldo chapel inside the cathedral.

Churches include the San Cataldo Cathedral (10th century) in Piazza Duomo, San Domenico Maggiore (1302), Sant'Andrea degli Armeni (16th century), Sant'Agostino (1402), San Michele (1763), Sant'Anna, the Madonna della Salute sanctuary (1752), and San Giuseppe (16th century). Close to the San Agostino church, located near Pendio La Riccia, the buried remains of an ancient Greek temple were discovered.

Beginning in 1934 Benito Mussolini embarked on a project of rejuvenation that involved the demolition of the working class Turipenne pittaggio along the Via Garibaldi and Discesa Vasto which contained the homes of local fishermen as well as the old Jewish quarter. The demolitions, which also razed the old medieval wall and three churches out of the four within the area, continued until the outbreak of World War II. Modern edifices and apartment blocks were erected to replace the demolished structures.

In addition to the many palazzi, Old City has myriad arched alleyways, saliti, vicoli and small streets, some of which are closed to traffic. Between 2013 and 2014 two Neapolitan urban artists Cyop and Kaf embarked on a project to decorate derelict buildings, walls and doors in the piazzi and vicoli with 120 representations of street art. It has since become a striking feature of Old City which is described as the abandoned district of Taranto.

== Cuisine ==
Taranto's cuisine is characterised by local products, especially vegetables and fish like artichokes, eggplants, tomatoes, olives, onions, shrimps, octopus, sardines, squid and, above all, mussels. A very important role is also played by the olive oil and bread produced in the city and in all the villages of its province. Some PDO, PGI and PAT are made in the countryside of Taranto and in the villages around the city: among them we can find some extra-virgin olive oil like Terre Tarentine PDO and Terra d'Otranto PDO, fruits like Uva di Puglia PGI and Clementine del Golfo di Taranto PGI, vegetables like the Barattiere PAT, Pomodorino di Manduria, types of cheese like Burrata di Andria PGI and Ricotta Forte PAT, a type of bread called Pane di Laterza PAT and the Capocollo di Martina Franca PAT, a type of capocollo. Other appreciated street foods are the tarallini, the panzerotti, the pucce.

=== Mussels of Taranto ===
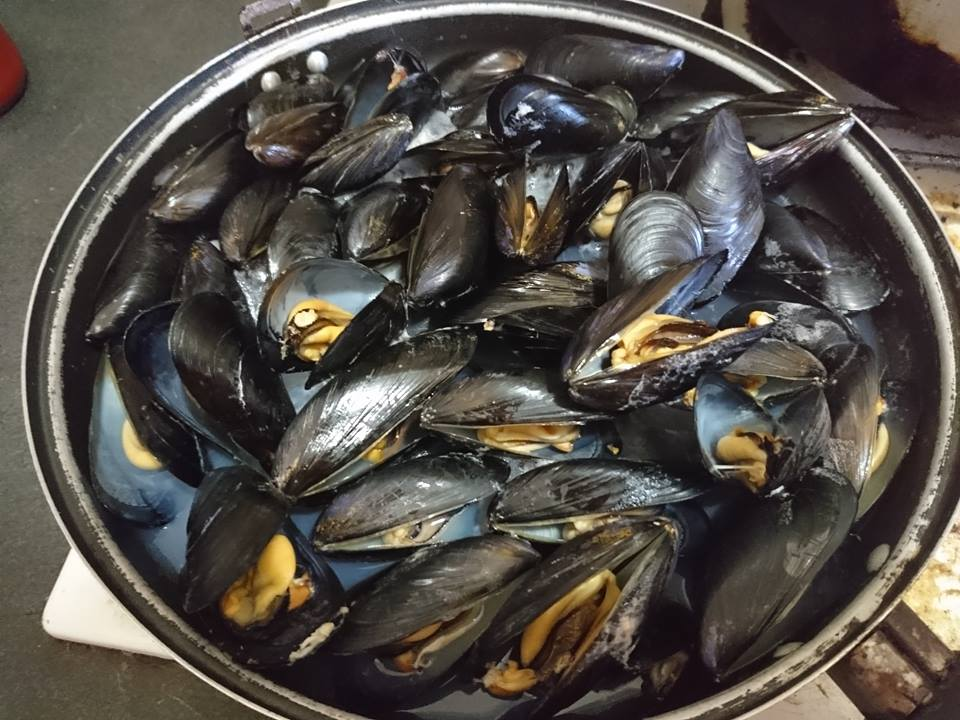
Tarantinian mussels cooked in a pan

A very important ingredient of the cuisine of Taranto is mussels. They are grown in the Big Sea and, above all, in the Little Sea (see above). They have been inserted in the list of Traditional Food Products by the Italian Ministry of Agricultural, Food and Forestry Policies. The peculiar flavour of Tarantine mussels is given by the special conditions of salinity of the Little Sea which is crossed by the citri, submarine freshwater springs which manage to oxygenate the water, helping the development of the plankton and by the freshwater come from the Galeso river. The piles for the mussels were anciently made with wood from Sila Mountains in Calabria. During the Ancient Greek and Roman times, several authors described the richness and the goodness of the mussels of Taranto. After the tests about the pollution that is present in the first side of the Little Sea, the legal production of mussels has been moved to the second side. The tests and the classifications of the water are made by producers giving the possibility to certify the safety of the product. Some of the most traditional dishes of Taranto are mussels alla puppitegna (with garlic, extra-virgin olive oil and parsley) or the impepata ("full of pepper" in Italian) or spaghetti with mussels, or Tubettini with mussels.

== Education ==
Among the various school are: Liceo Scientifico Battaglini, Liceo Archita (the most ancient), Liceo Quinto Ennio (in Literature), Liceo Aristosseno (Languages, Science, Humanistic), Galileo Ferraris, ITCS Pitagora da Taranto, Vittorino da Feltre, Cabrini, ITIS Righi and ITIS Pacinotti (in IT) and ITC V. Bachelet (in Commercial and Accounting – famous for the activities at BIT MILANO).

== Environment ==
In 1991 Taranto was declared a high environmental risk area by the Ministry of Environment. As a consequence of the pollutants discharged into the air by the factories in the area, most notably the ILVA steel plant, part of Riva Group. 7% of Taranto's pollution is produced by the public; 93% is produced by factories. In 2005, the European Pollutant Emission Register estimated dioxin emissions from the Taranto ILVA plant were responsible for 83% of Italy's total reported emissions. Every year the city is exposed to 2.7 t (2.7 long tons; 3.0 short tons) of carbon monoxide and 57.7 t (56.8 long tons; 63.6 short tons) of carbon dioxide. In 2014, the Italian National Institute of Emissions and their Sources, stated that Taranto stands third in the world behind China's Linfen, and Copşa Mică in Romania, the most polluted cities in the world due to factories' emissions.

In particular, the city produces ninety-two percent of Italy's dioxin. This is 8.8 percent of the dioxin in Europe. Between 1995 and 2004, leukaemias, myelomas and lymphomas increased by 30 to 40 percent. Dioxin accumulates over the years. Over 9 kilos of dioxin have been discharged into the city's air by its factories. Grazing is banned within 20 km (12 mi) of the ILVA plant.

In 2013, the ILVA plant was placed under special administration when its owner, the Riva family, was accused of failing to prevent toxic emissions, which caused at least 400 premature deaths. Emissions of both carbon monoxide, carbon dioxide and dioxin have decreased. Animal species have returned that had left, including swallows, cranes, dolphins, seahorses and the coral reef.

== Transport ==
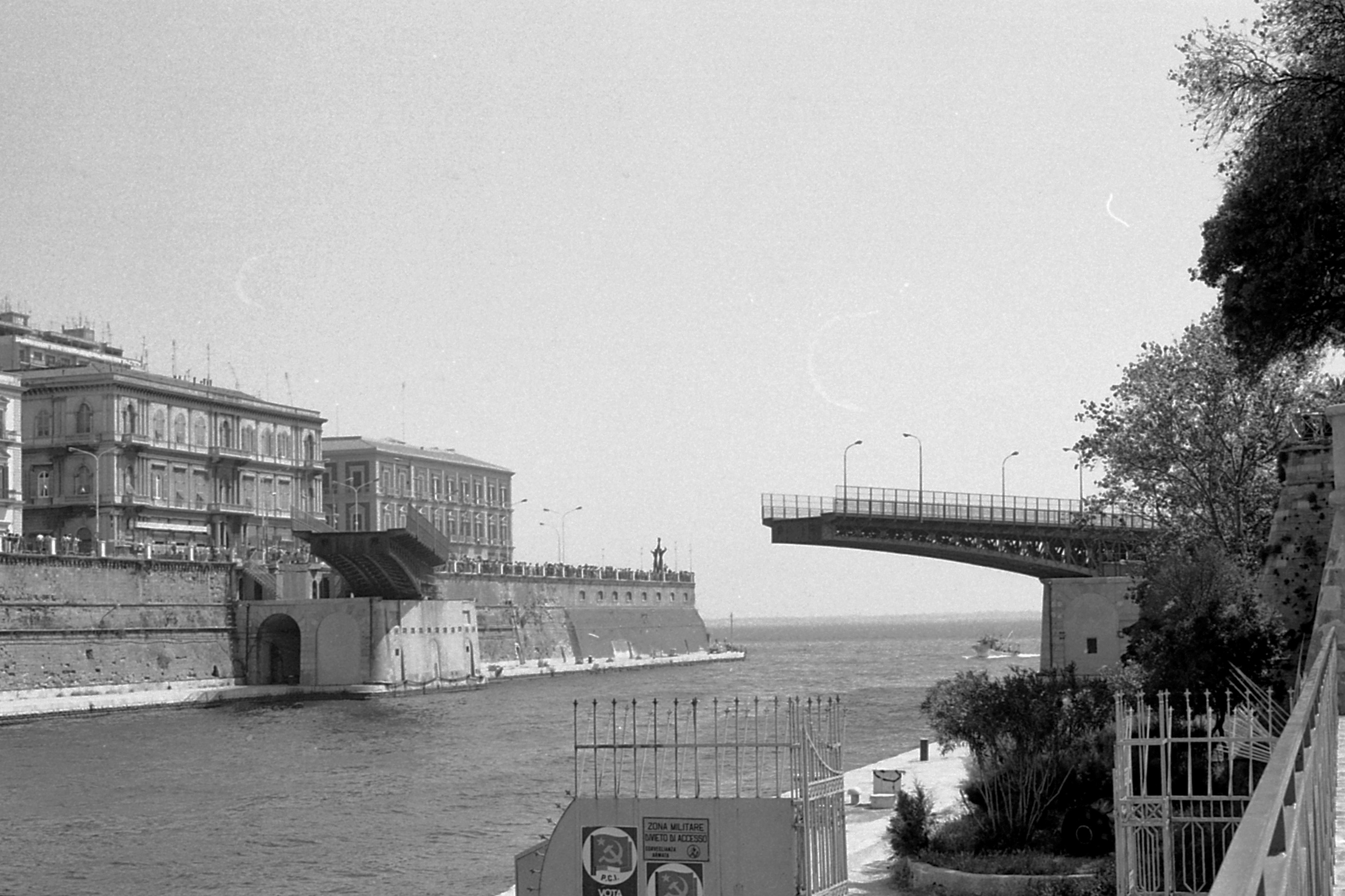
The two leaves of the 1887-built Ponte Girevole turning to open the waterway for a large ship

=== Rail ===
Taranto railway station connects the city with Rome, Naples, Milan, Bologna, Bari, Reggio di Calabria and Brindisi.

=== Air ===
Taranto-Grottaglie Airport is located 16 km away from Taranto, but does not offer any regularly scheduled commercial services. Efforts by local communities that call for such services are ongoing. The two closest airports that do offer regularly scheduled commercial services are in Brindisi and Bari, approximately 70 km and 90 km away, respectively.

=== Other ===
The Ponte Girevole (swing bridge), built in 1887, runs across the navigable ship canal that joins Mar Piccolo (Little Sea) with Mar Grande (Big Sea) and stretches along 89.9 m (295 ft). When the bridge is open, the two ends of the city are disconnected.

== Sports ==
- SS Taranto Calcio (Football)

=== 2026 Mediterranean Games ===
Taranto hosted the 2026 Mediterranean Games in August–September, the fourth time Italy hosted the Games.

== Notable people ==
These historical figures have had a relationship with the city. Not all of them were actually born in Taranto.

- Archytas (428-347 BC) of Tarentum, philosopher, mathematician, astronomer, statesman, strategist and commander-in-chief of the army of Tarentum
- Philolaus (c. 470 - c. 385 BCE), mathematician and philosopher
- Aristoxenus (c. 375 - after 335 BCE), peripatetic philosopher, and writer on music and rhythm
- Leonidas of Tarentum (3rd century BCE), poet
- Lysis of Tarentum (c. 5th century BCE), philosopher
- Cleinias of Tarentum (4th century BCE), Pythagorean philosopher
- Rhinthon (c. 323–285 BC), dramatist
- Zeuxis (3rd century BCE), physician
- Livius Andronicus (с. 284- с. 205 BCE), poet
- Titus Quinctius Flamininus (c. 229 - c. 174 BCE), propraetor of Tarentum
- Pacuvius (220 - c. 130), tragic poet, died in Tarentum in 130 BC
- Cataldus (с 7th century), archbishop and patron saint of Taranto
- Bohemond of Taranto (c. 1054 -1111), (born in Calabria) key military leader on the First Crusade
- Philip I, Prince of Taranto, Latin Emperor in exile 1313–1332 (as Philip II), king of Albania
- Gil Albornoz, archbishop of Taranto in 1644
- Nicola Fago (1677-1745), composer, teacher, and church musician (maestro di cappella) in Naples
- Giovanni Paisiello (1740-1816), composer associated with Naples
- Carlo Balsamo di Specchia-Normandia (1890 - 1960), commander of the naval forces of Italian East Africa during the early stages of World War II.
- Pierre Choderlos de Laclos, Napoleonic army general and novelist, died in Taranto
- Etienne-Jacques-Joseph-Alexandre MacDonald (1765–1840), duke of Taranto and marshal of France
- Marcus Fulvius Nobilior, rumoured to have been born here and not Rome as was first assumed
- Riccardo Tisci, fashion designer, creative director of Givenchy
- Roberta Vinci, professional tennis player
- Cosimo Damiano Lanza, pianist, harpsichordist and composer
- Pino De Vittorio, singer, actor
- Filippo Di Stani, Italian footballer
- Quentin Tarantino, whose family derives its surname from its origins in the city
- Michele Riondino, actor, director, singer
- Laura Albanese, Italian-Canadian newscaster and politician
- Nicola Martinucci, opera singer
- Alessandro Leogrande, journalist
- Anna Fougez, actress and singer
- Diodato, singer and author who was also designated as the Italian representative at the Eurovision Song Contest 2020, event cancelled due to the COVID-19 pandemic
- Giobbe Covatta, actor, performer writer and social activist

== International relations ==
=== Twin towns – sister cities ===
Taranto is twinned with:

- Sparta, Greece (since 2015)
- Brest, France (since 1964)
- Donetsk, Ukraine (since 1985)
- Alicante, Spain (since 2010)
- Islamabad, Pakistan (since 2010)

== See also ==
- Second Punic War
  - First Battle of Tarentum (212 BC)
  - Second Battle of Tarentum (209 BC)
- Battle of Taranto (1940 AD)
- Tarantella (folk dance)
