= Temple of Poseidon (Taranto) =

Peripteral Doric Greek temple

Coordinates: 40.4738°N 17.2330°E

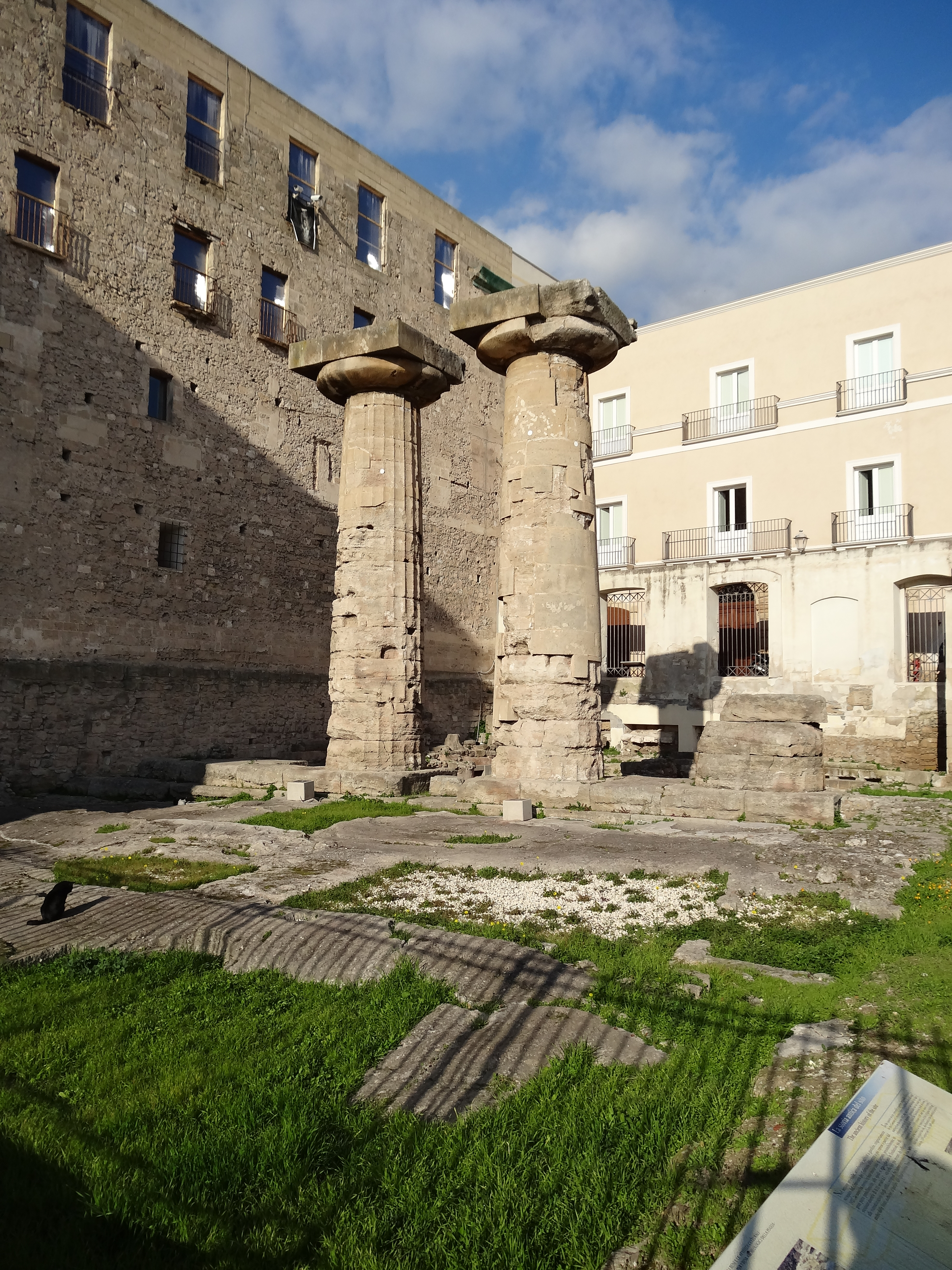
The remaining columns of the Doric temple

The Temple of Poseidon (or the Doric Temple) is a peripteral Doric temple of Magna Graecia located in the modern piazza Castello in the historic centre of Taranto, Italy. It is the oldest temple in Magna Graecia and the only Greek religious structure still visible in the old town of Taranto. The temple dates to the first quarter of the sixth century BC. It fell into ruin in the Middle Ages and parts of it were reused in the construction of other buildings.

== Description ==
The devastation and ruination experienced by the temple over the centuries, especially the phenomenon of spoliation, has made it impossible to outline an exact plan of the temple.

The two remaining columns of the Doric order and three drums of a third column base were made of local carparo stone taken from the city's acropolis and were part of the long side of the peristasis of the temple, whose remains have been identified in the choir and cellars of the Monastery of San Michele, which is near the ruins alongside the Palazzo di Città. The columns are 8.47 metres high with a diameter of 2.05 metres and are separated by an interval of 3.72 metres. From observation of the area of the peristasis and calculations of the relationship between its width and the interval, it has been suggested that the temple's front faced the navigable canal bridged by the Ponte di San Francesco di Paola, and that it had six columns on the short sides and 13 n the long sides. Further, the very low profile of the capitals and the column drums which are stacked atop one another without a central pin, indicates that they were manufactured before the beginning of the fifth century BC.

It is assumed that the Doric peristyle belongs to a phase of renovation and expansion after the construction of the cella, since there are no structural connections between its foundations and those of the older nucleus. The presence of a little ditch next to the columns, as well as traces at the edge of it, suggest the existence of a pavement and a raised wooden platform belonging to an original cult building of rough bricks and perishable material built at the end of the 8th century BC by the original Spartan colonists.

== Afterlife ==
The sacred area became a granary in the 6th century when the population retreated into the peninsula for defensive reasons. In the 10th century, the remains of the temple formed a Christian church, while from the 14th century, part of the area was used for industrial activity, with clay decanting vases and little kilns.

The ruins of the temple were incorporated into the Church of the Holy Trinity, the court of the Oratory of the Trinity, the Casa Mastronuzzi and the Convent of the Celestines. In 1700, ten sections of columns were still visible but they were removed and dispersed during the renovation of the convent in 1729. At the end of the 19th century, the archaeologist Luigi Viola investigated the remains of the temple and attributed it to Poseidon, but it was more likely connected to the female divinities Artemis, Persephone or Hera. Other remains were dispersed with the demolition of the convent in 1926 and of the nearby church in 1973.

== See also ==
- History of Taranto
- List of Ancient Greek temples

== Bibliography ==
- Patrizia De Luca - Il Centro Storico di Taranto: l'Isola - Scorpione Editrice - Taranto, 2004
- Enzo Lippolis; Monica Liviadotti; Giorgio Rocco (2007). Architettura greca. Storia e monumenti del mondo della polis dalle origini al V secolo. Bruno Mondadori. ISBN 9 788842 492207.
