= Castello Aragonese (Taranto) =

Castle in Taranto, Italy

Coordinates: 40°28′21.43″N 17°14′02.56″E

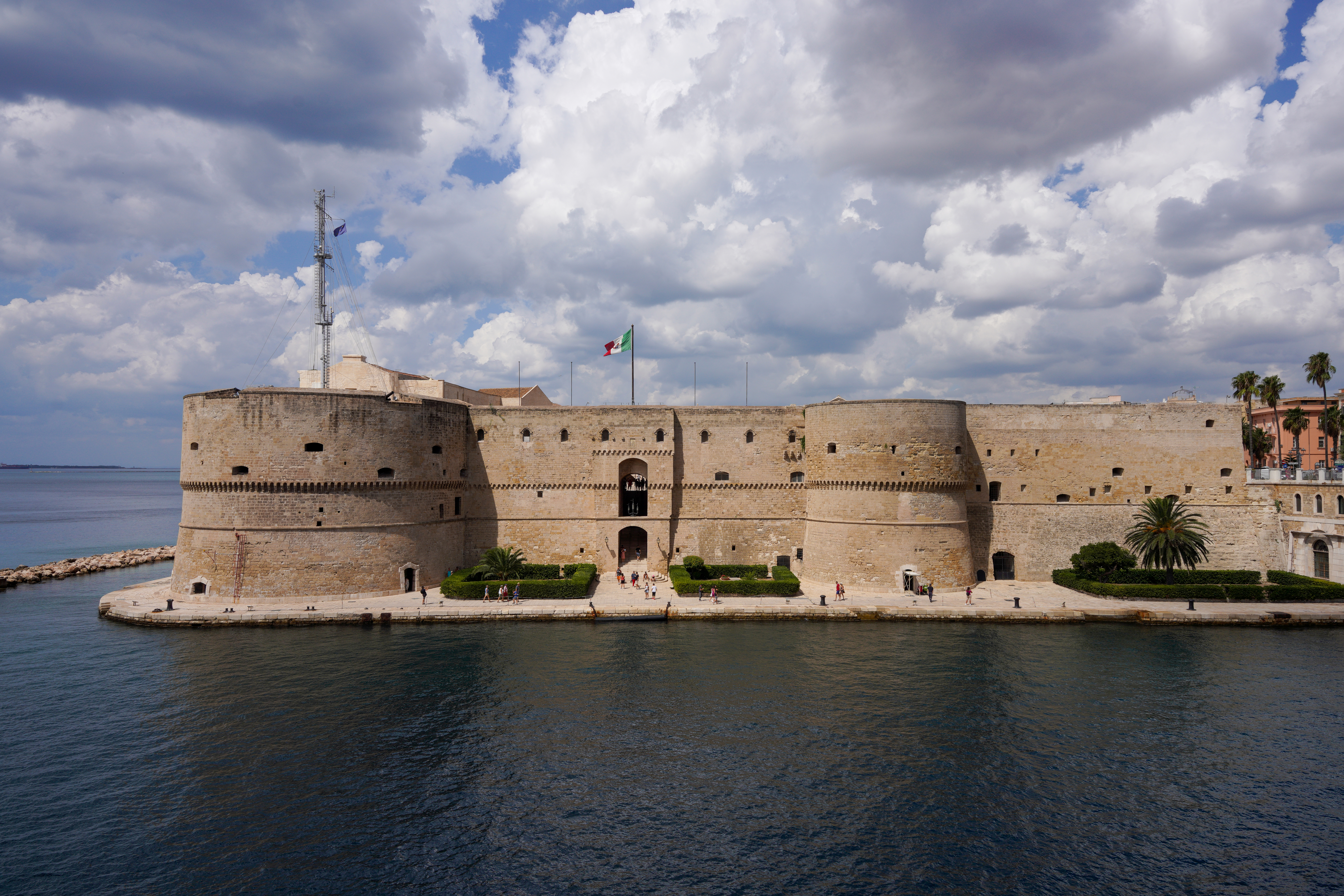
Castello Aragonese in 2022

The Castello Aragonese is a fortification in Taranto, Italy. Officially called the Castel San Angelo, it was built on the site of older fortifications dating to Greek occupation in the third and fourth centuries BC. In 1481 the low ground in front of the fortification site was excavated to allow the passage of boats, and to create a moated defensive position. The present fortress was built for the then-king of Naples, Ferdinand II of Aragon in 1496 to reinforce the naturally low-lying link between the old town of Taranto on a peninsula, and the mainland. The seven-towered design is attributed to Francesco di Giorgio Martini of Siena. The fortress repelled an Ottoman attack in 1594, but it quickly lost its military significance with the advent of artillery. It was converted to an artillery platform and many interior spaces were filled in to provide a stable base for the guns. In 1707 under the Habsburgs it was converted to a prison however during the Napoleonic period it reverted to its original function as a military fortress. French generals Thomas-Alexandre Dumas and Jean-Baptiste Felix de Manscourt du Rozoy were the most illustrious prisoners of the castle having been taken prisoner in 1799 by the pro-Bourbon Sanfedismi when their damaged ship sought refuge at Taranto Harbour. At the time, Taranto was part of the Kingdom of Naples.

In 1883 the San Angelo tower was demolished to allow construction of the Ponte Girevole, and two others were removed to allow the widening of the canal. Since 1883 the fort has been occupied by the Italian Navy. Beginning in 2003 the Navy began restoration and archeological work on the site, removing plasterwork and investigating fortification work dating back to the Byzantine era. The fort is open for tours.
