= Taranto Cathedral =

Cathedral in Taranto, Apulia, Italy

Coordinates: 40.47605°N 17.22856°E

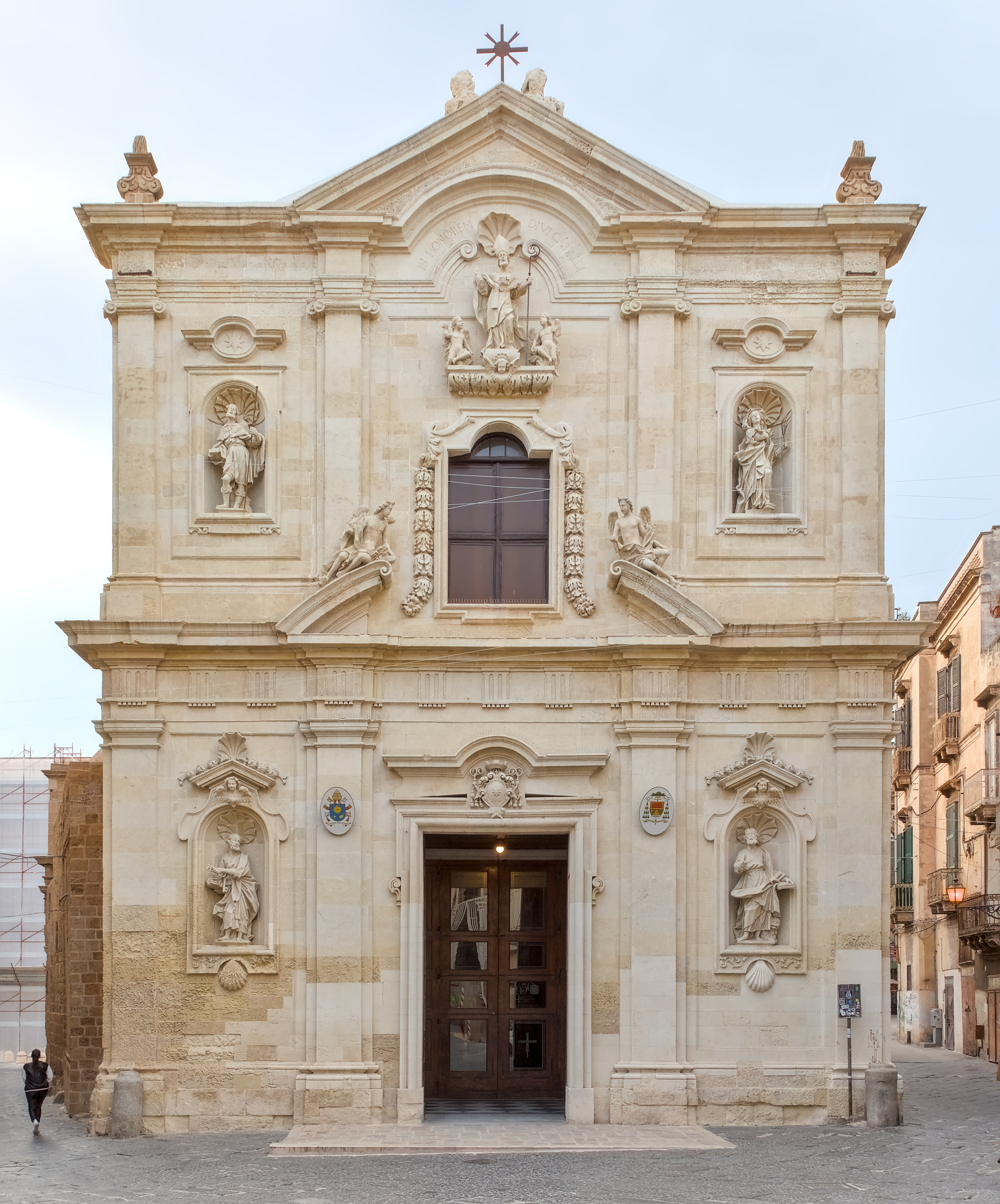
West front of the cathedral

Taranto Cathedral (Italian: Cattedrale di San Cataldo) is a Roman Catholic cathedral in Taranto, Apulia, Italy, dedicated to Saint Catald, who is the city's patron saint. It is the archiepiscopal seat of the Archdiocese of Taranto. The Cathedral was built by the Byzantines in the 10th century, under Emperor Nicephorus II Phocas, over an earlier construction dating from the 5th century, and is the oldest cathedral in Apulia.

The Baroque-style façade and its statues date from the early 18th century, and are attributed to the architect and sculptor Mauro Manieri, born in Lecce in 1697. They were part of an architectural renovation of the cathedral commissioned by the Archbishop Giovan Battista Stella, whose coat of arms can be seen above the main entrance.

Interior

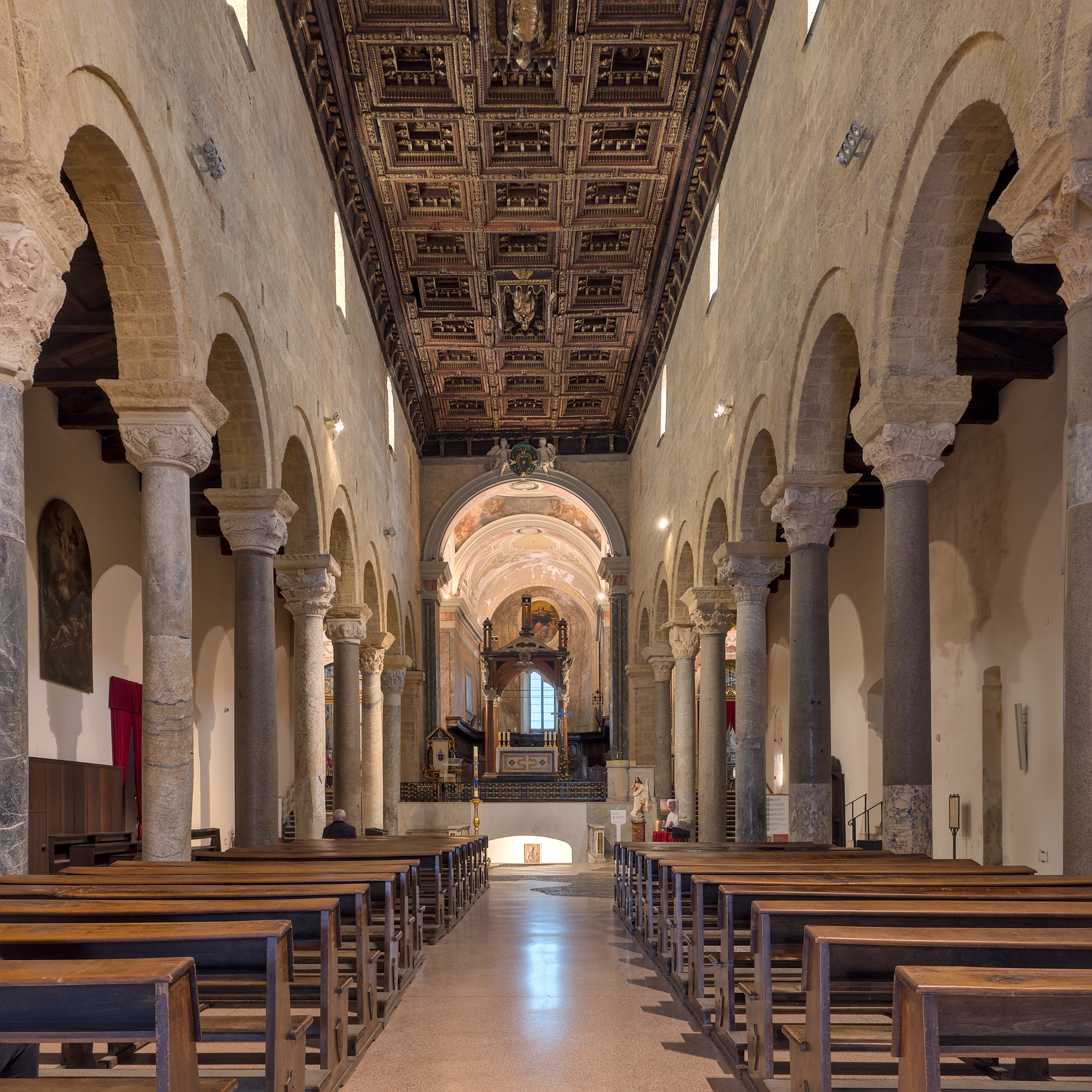
The nave

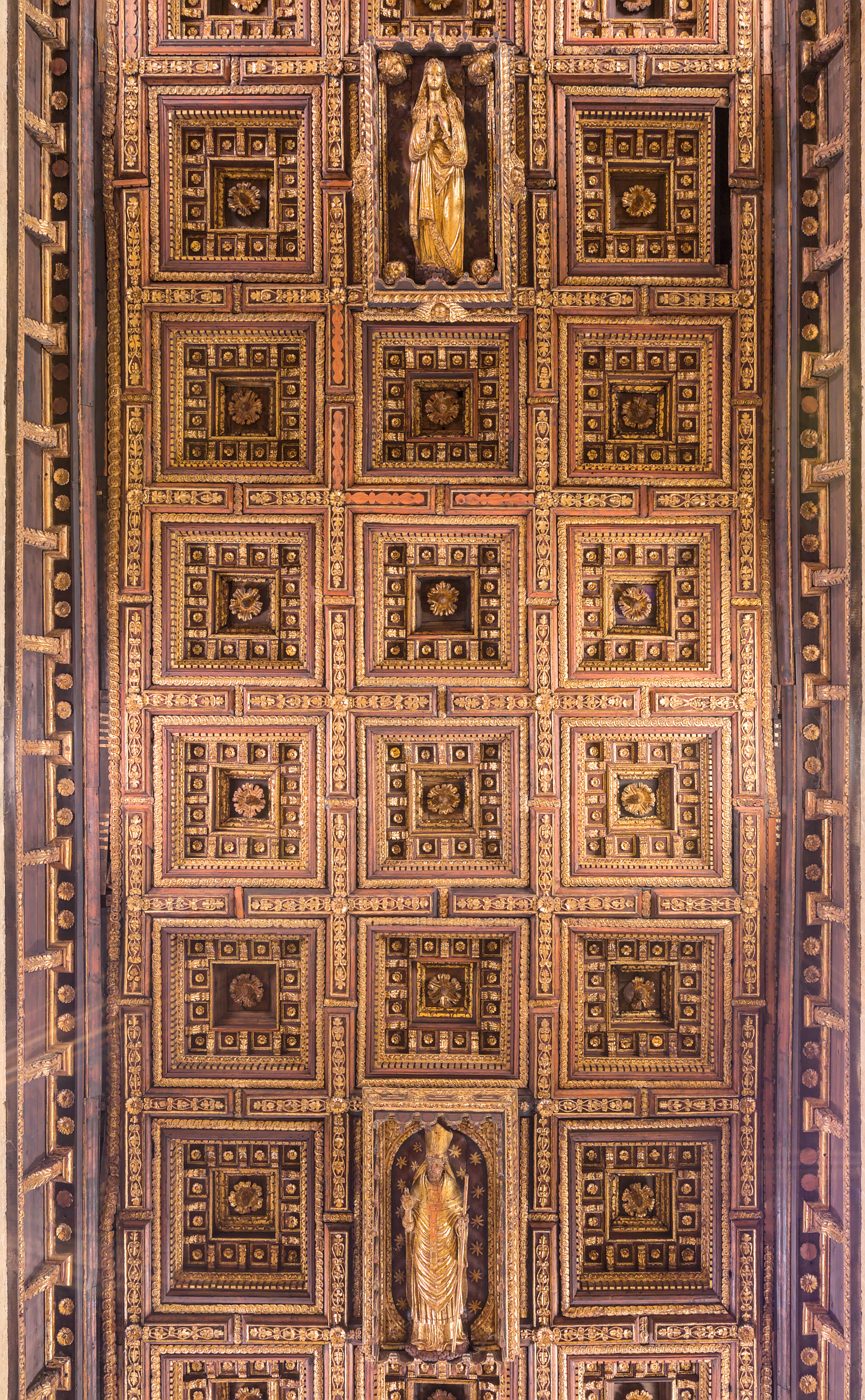
Coffered ceiling of the nave.

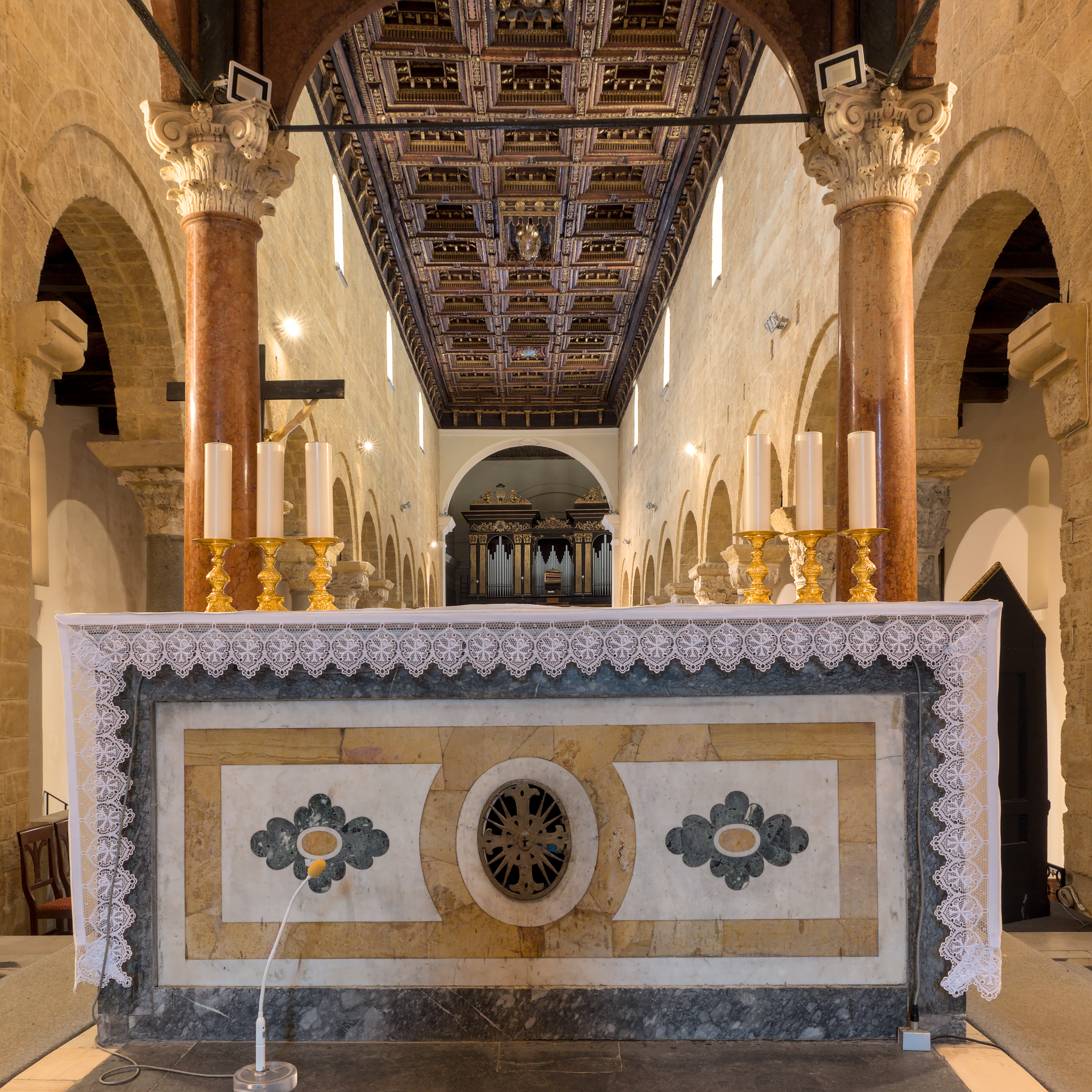
Altar and nave seen from the choir.

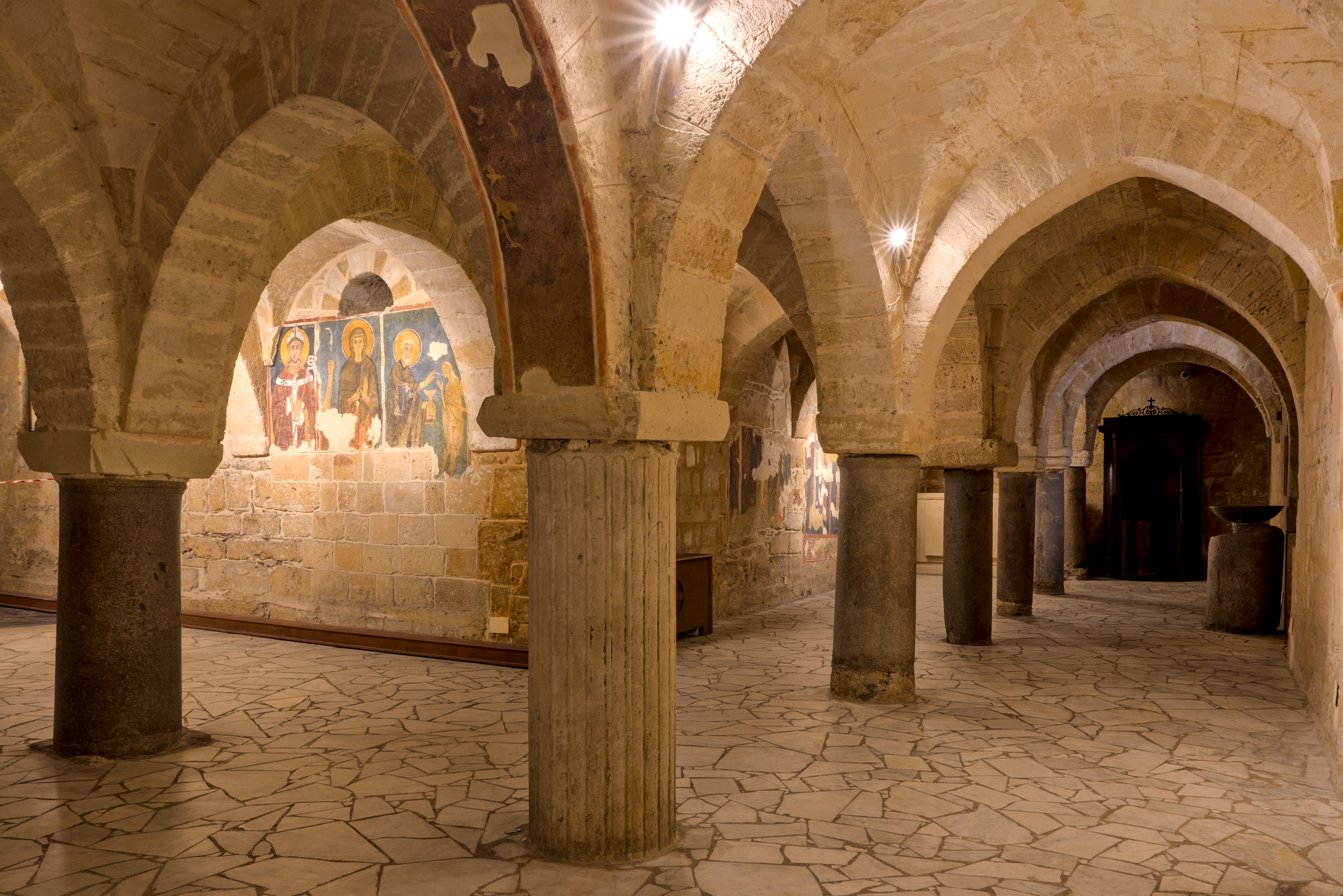
The crypt.

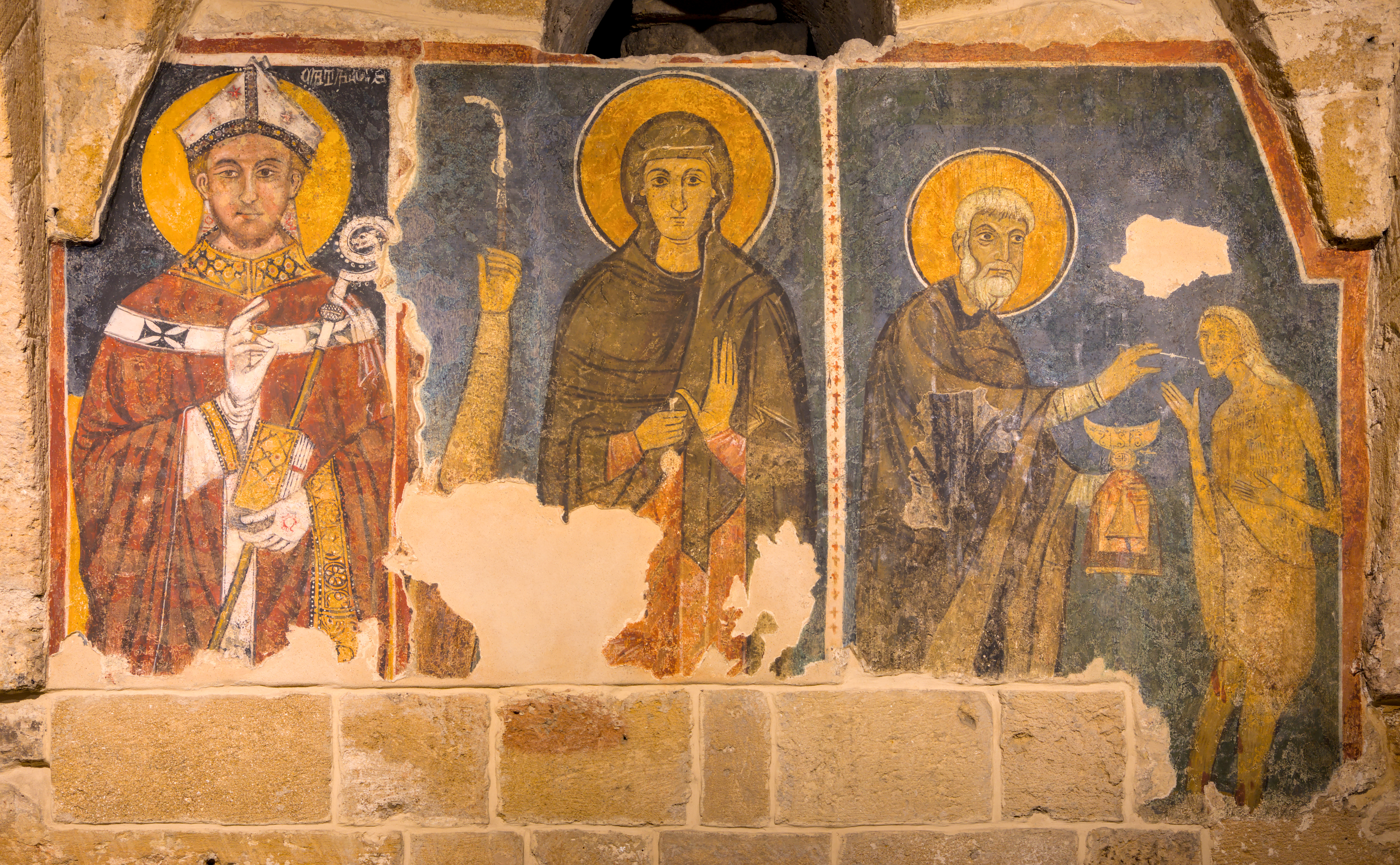
Fresco in the crypt.
The Saint Catald chapel

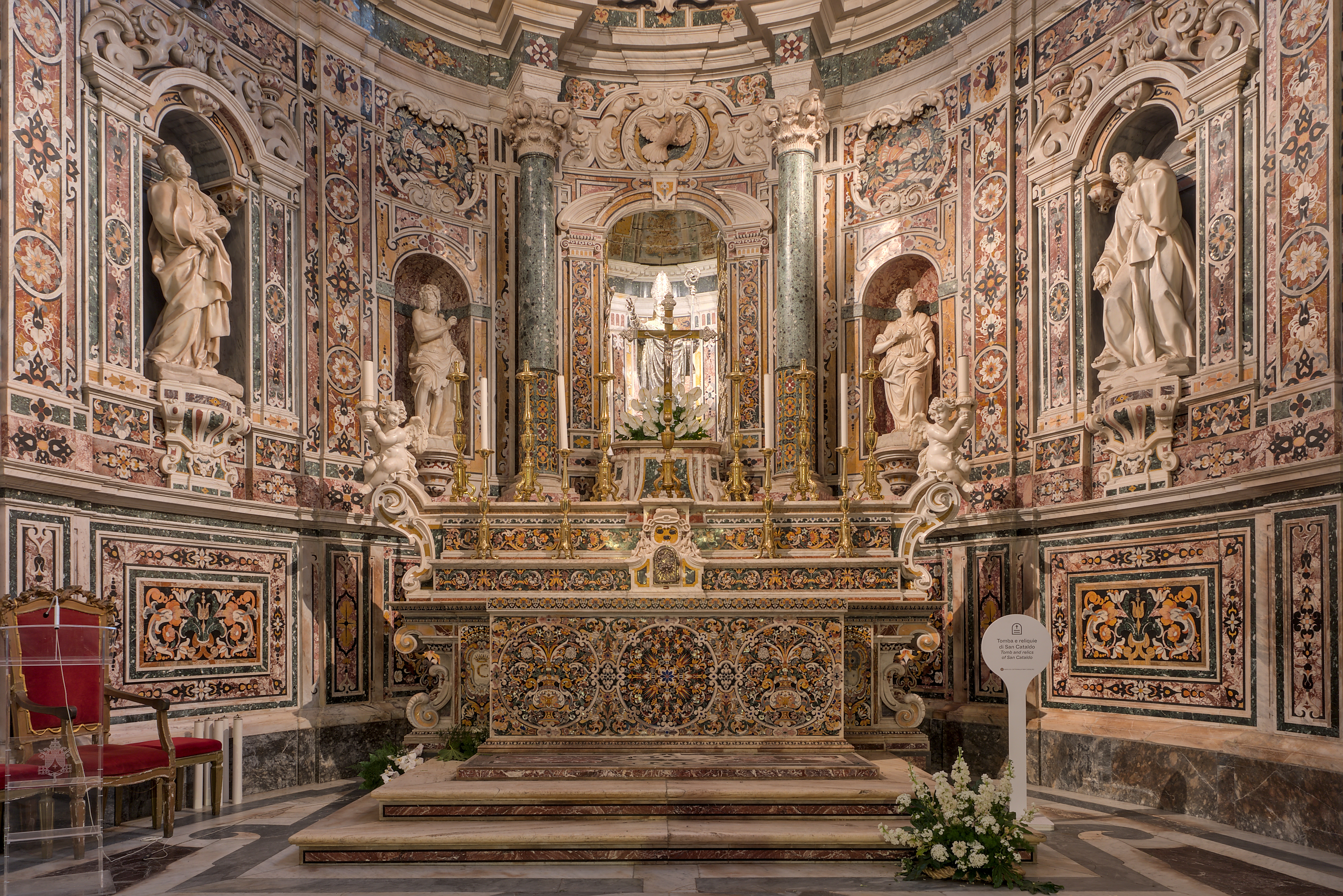
Choir of the chapel.

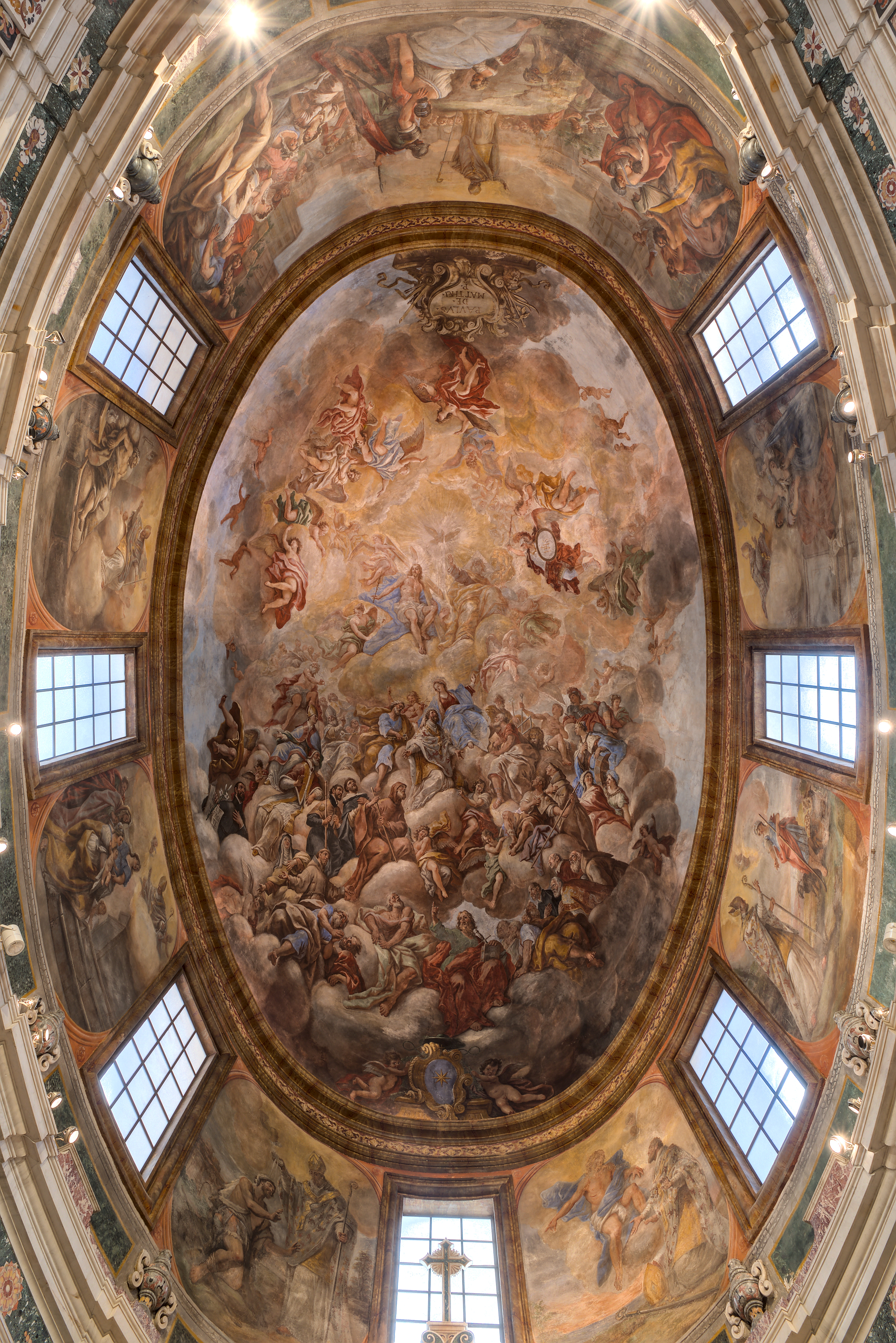
Ceiling of the chapel.

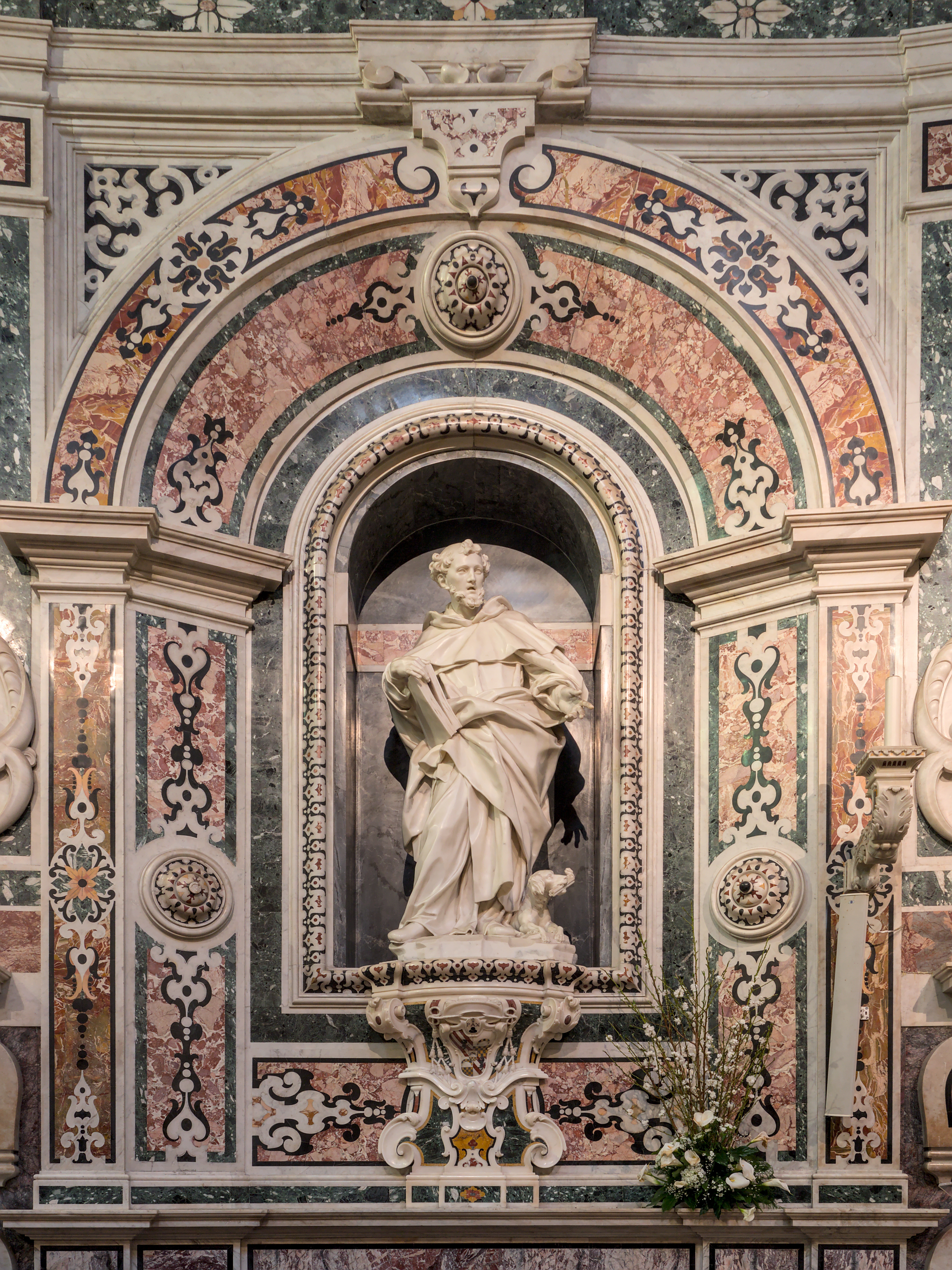
A niche with the statue of saint Dominic.

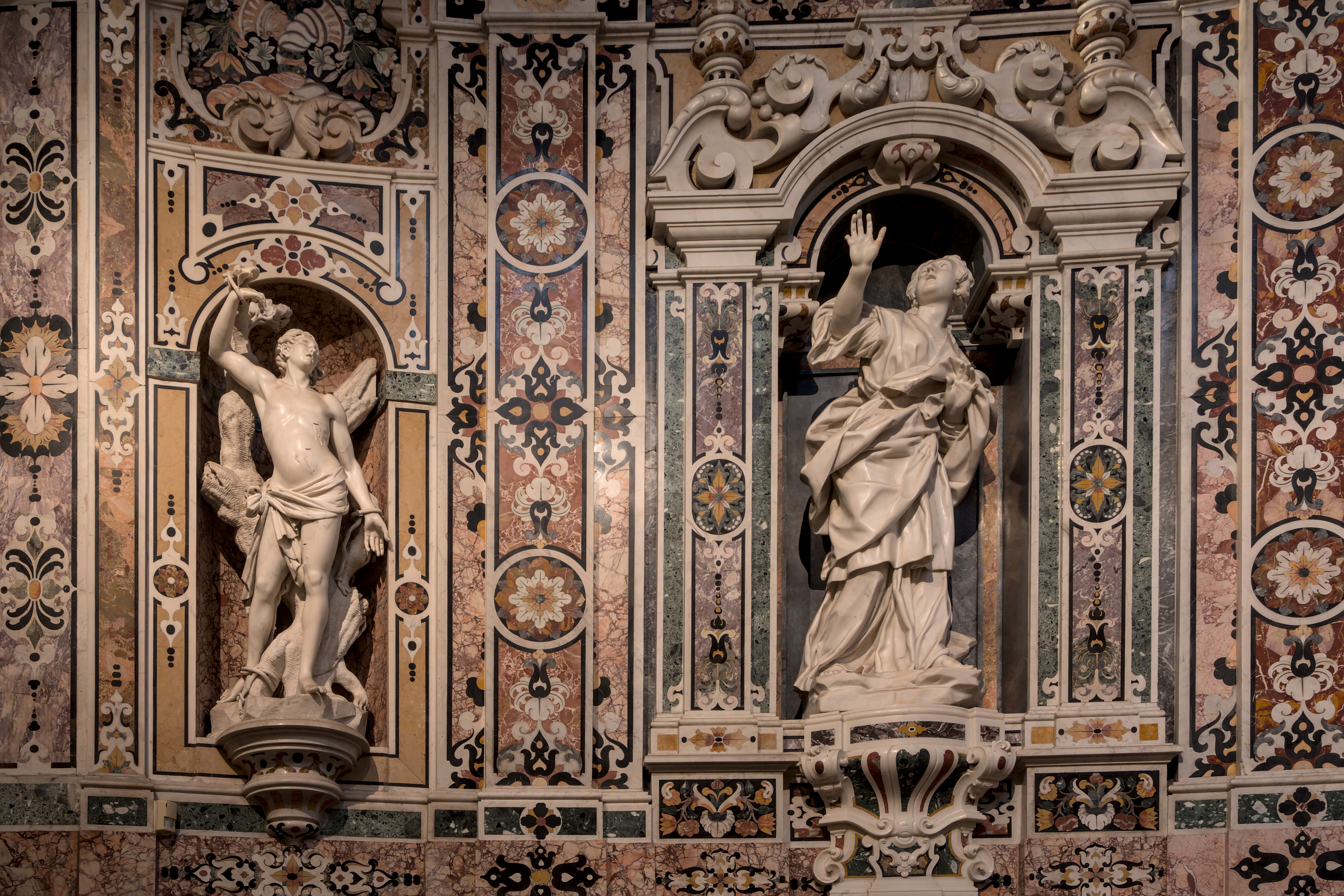
Niches with the statues of saint Sebastian and saint Irene.

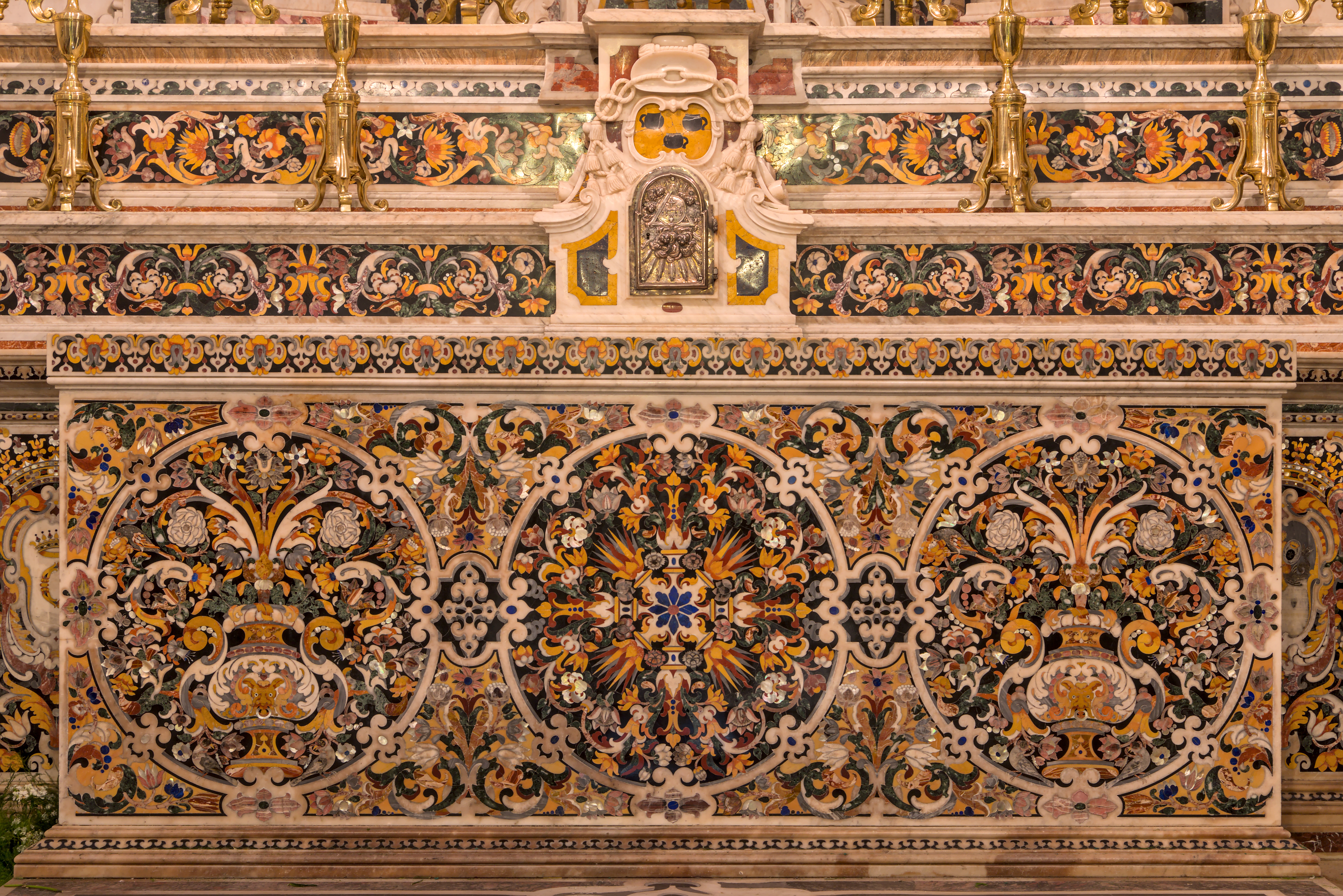
Detail of the marblework of the altar of the chapel.
