= Filippo Di Stani =

Italian footballer

Personal information
- Date of birth: November 11, 1981 (age 44)
- Place of birth: Taranto, Italy
- Position: Defender

Team information
- Current team: Cavese

Senior career*
Years	Team	Apps	(Gls)
2006	Toma Maglie	?	(?)
2006–2007	Sangiustese	17	(2)
2007–2009	Vibonese	23	(0)
2009	Perugia	0	(0)
2009–	Cavese	0	(0)
- * Club domestic league appearances and goals as of 12:44, 4 May 2010 (UTC)

Filippo Di Stani (born 21 April 1986) is an Italian football defender who plays for S.S. Cavese 1919.

== See also ==
- Football in Italy
- List of football clubs in Italy
