= Ponte Girevole =

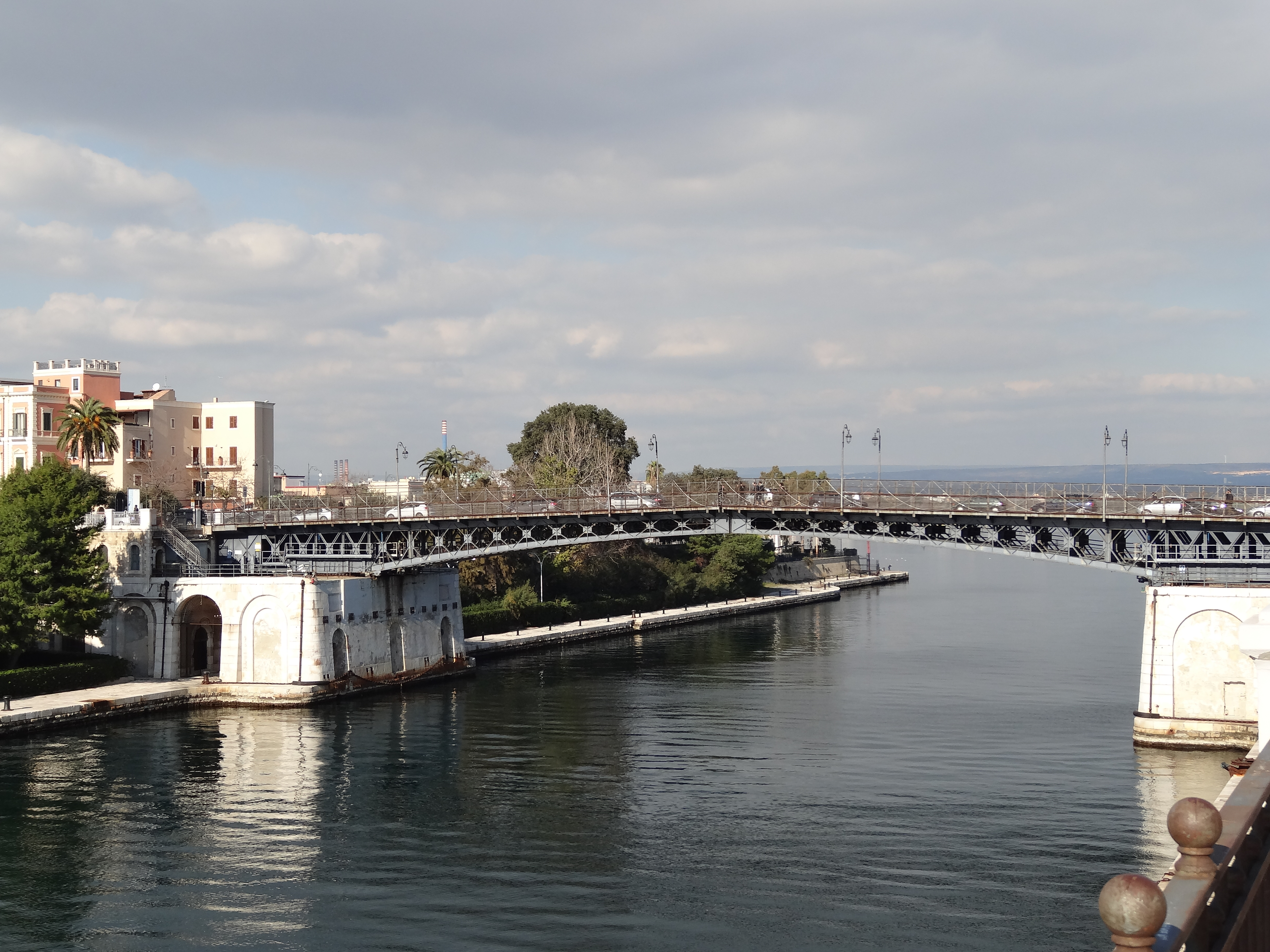
- Ponte Girevole in 2013
- Coordinates: 40°28′23.62″N 17°14′07.26″E
- Locale: The old and new towns of Taranto, Italy
- Official name: Ponte di San Francesco di Paola

Characteristics
- Design: Swing bridge, with two swinging half-spans
- Total length: 88.9 metres (292 ft)
- Width: 9.3 metres (31 ft)

History
- Opened: March 10, 1958

Location
- Interactive map of Ponte Girevole

The Ponte Girevole is a swing bridge in Taranto, Italy, spanning the navigation canal between Taranto's Mar Grande and the Mar Piccolo. The bridge connects Borgo Antico (Old Town) island to the Borgo Nuovo (new Town) peninsula. The canal was excavated in 1481 as part of the defenses of Taranto. A steel and wood bridge was first built across the canal in 1886. The present steel bridge was built in 1958. Officially titled the Ponte di San Francesco di Paola, the bridge has two swing spans that pivot near the banks of the canal to meet in the middle of the canal. When open, the halves are parallel to the embankment, leaving the width of the canal clear for passage. The bridge is a Taranto landmark.

The canal is 400 metres (1,300 ft) long and 73 metres (240 ft) wide. The first bridge was hydraulically operated using water stored in the Castello Aragonese. The 1958 replacement was designed by the National Society of Savigliano and built in the former Tosi shipyard in Taranto. It was inaugurated on 10 March 1958 by Italian president Giovanni Gronchi. The new bridge is electrically operated from control stations on each embankment. The sequence of operation requires the Old Town span to open to 45 degrees first, then the New Town span opens 90 degrees, and finally the Old Town span opens to its full 90 degrees.

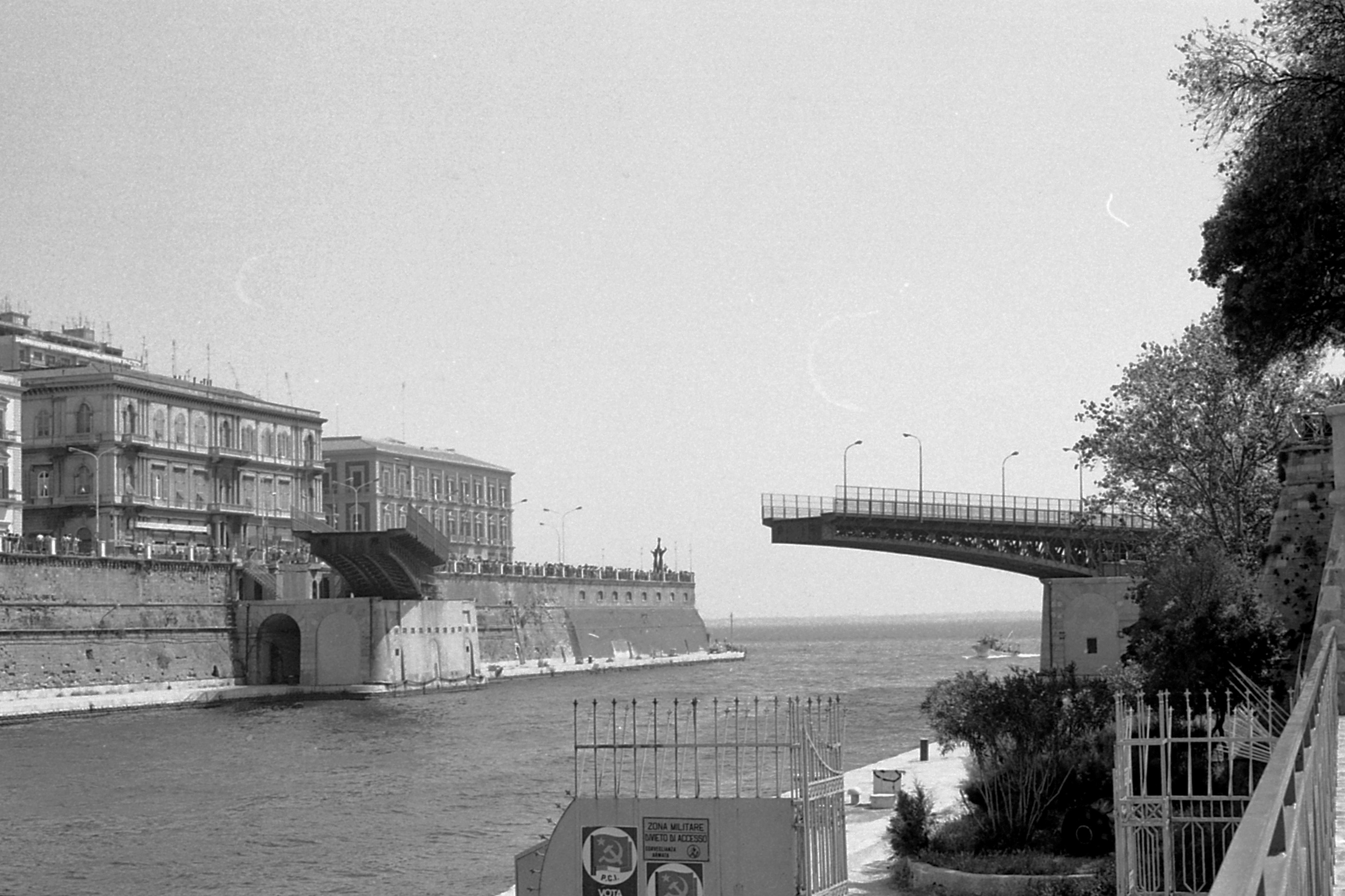
The bridge in the process of opening

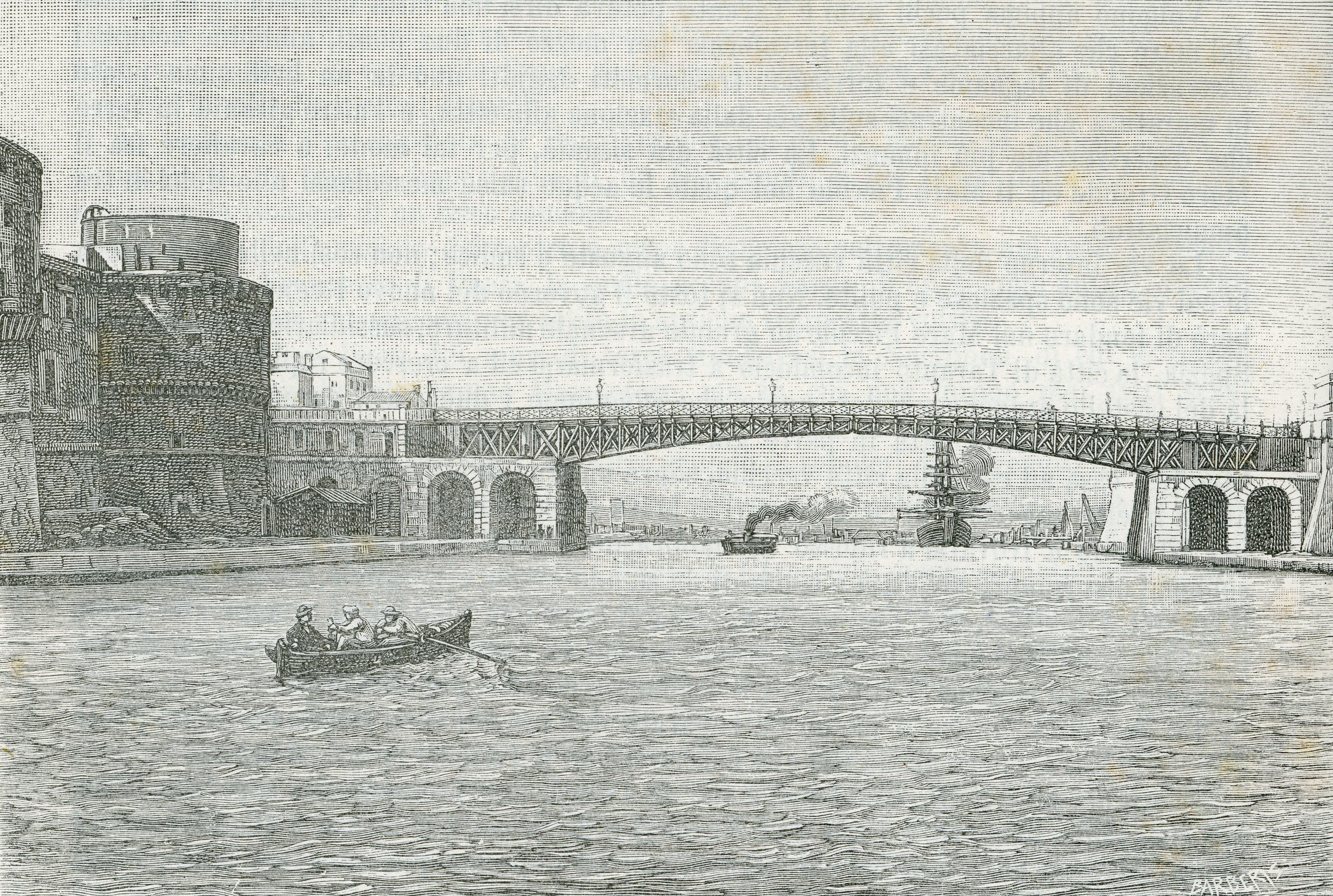
Woodcut of the original bridge, Barberis (1898)
