= Cleinias of Tarentum =

Ancient Greek philosopher

Cleinias of Tarentum (Ancient Greek: Κλεινίας; fl. 4th century BCE), Magna Graecia, was a Pythagorean philosopher, and a contemporary and friend of Plato, as appears from the story (perhaps otherwise worthless) which Diogenes Laërtius gives on the authority of Aristoxenus, to the effect that Plato wished to burn all the writings of Democritus which he could collect, but was prevented by Cleinias and Amyclus of Heraclea. In his practice, Cleinias was a true Pythagorean. Thus, we hear that he used to assuage his anger by playing on his harp, and when Prorus of Cyrene had lost all his fortune through a political revolution, Cleinias, who knew nothing of him except that he was a Pythagorean, assumed the risk of a voyage to Cyrene, and supplied him with money to the full extent of his loss.

Two fragments of Pythagorean pseudepigrapha are attributed to Cleinias, one preserved by Stobaeus, the other in the Theology of Arithmetic attributed to Iamblichus.
