= Citro =

Citro is a surname. Notable people with the surname include:

- Constance F. Citro, American statistician
- Domenico Citro, Italian football player
- Joseph A. Citro, American novelist
- Ralph Citro (1926–2004), American historian
- Christopher Citro, American poet
