= History of Taranto =

History of the Italian city

The origin of the city of Taranto dates from the 8th century BC when it was founded as a Greek colony, known as Taras.

Taras gradually increased its influence, becoming a commercial power and a city-state of Magna Graecia and ruling over many of the Greek colonies in southern Italy.

== Greek period ==
=== Foundation ===
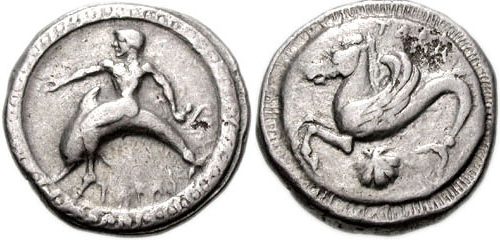
Ancient coin from Taranto, with the eponym Taras hero riding a dolphin.

Taranto was founded in 706 BC by Dorian immigrants hailing from Sparta. Its origins are peculiar: the founders were Partheniae, sons of unmarried Spartan women and perioeci (free men, but not citizens of Sparta); these unions were decreed by the Spartans to increase the number of soldiers (only the citizens of Sparta could become soldiers) during the bloody First Messenian War, but later they were nullified, and the sons were forced to leave. There are some doubts about Taranto being of Spartan origin.

According to the legend Phalanthus, the Parthenian leader, went to Delphi to consult the oracle and received the puzzling answer that he should found a city where rain fell from a clear sky. After all attempts to capture a suitable place to found a colony failed, he became despondent, convinced that the oracle had told him something that was impossible, and was consoled by his wife. She laid his head in her lap and herself became disconsolate. When Phalanthus felt her tears splash onto his forehead he at last grasped the meaning of the oracle, for his wife's name meant clear sky. The harbour of Taranto in Apulia was nearby and he decided this must be the new home for the exiles. The Partheniae arrived and founded the city, naming it Taras after the son of the Greek sea god, Poseidon, and the local nymph Satyrion. A variation says Taras was founded in 707 BC by some Spartans, who, the sons of free women and enslaved fathers, were born during the Messenian War. According to other sources, Heracles founded the city. Another tradition indicates Taras himself as the founder of the city; the symbol of the Greek city (as well as of the modern city) is Taras riding a dolphin.

Herodotus mentions a certain Aristophilides of Taras, whom he describes as basileus (king) of Taras in the late archaic period. The nature of his rule has been debated. As basileus, Aristophilides is said to have exercised enough authority to direct action against Persian ships, which suggests either that he ruled as king, or that he held supreme executive power as the foremost magistrate of the polis. Many scholars have considered Aristophilides a tyrant, in line with the pattern of personal rule found in several Western Greek cities. However, Arther Ferrill has noted that Herodotus rarely applied the title basileus to Greek tyrants, reserving it instead for legitimate monarchs, and that his use of the term for Aristophilides may reflect a favorable source tradition rather than a neutral synonym for tyrant. Massimo Nafissi likewise observes that the possibility of Taras having basileis “cannot be disproved,” suggesting that Aristophilides may have been a king whose powers were consistent with a recognized politeia in the Aristotelian sense. Nafissi further points to local cults, such as Aphrodite Basilis and the Dioscuri, as carrying royal connotations that may support this interpretation. The existence of a basileus at Taras may not necessarily indicate monarchy in the strict sense, but rather the title of a chief magistrate within a republican framework. Given the fragmentary evidence for Archaic Tarentum, historians have been unable to draw a definitive conclusion about the nature of the Tarentine executive.

=== Expansion and conflict ===
The expansion of Taranto was limited to the coast because of the resistance of the populations of inner Apulia. In 472 BC, Taranto signed an alliance with Rhegion, to counter the Iapygian tribes of the Messapians and Peucetians, and the Oscan-speaking Lucanians (see Iapygian-Tarentine Wars), but the joint armies of the Tarentines and Rhegians were defeated near Kailia, in what Herodotus claims to be the greatest slaughter of Greeks in his knowledge, with 3,000 Rhegians and uncountable Tarentines killed. In 466 BC, Taranto was again defeated by the Iapygians; according to Aristotle, who praises its government, there were so many aristocrats killed that the democratic party was able to get the power, to remove the monarchy, inaugurate a democracy, and expel the Pythagoreans. Thus; Tarentum became an aristocratic republic, and became democratic when the ancient nobility dwindled.

However, the rise of the democratic party did not weaken the bonds of Taranto and her mother-city Sparta. In fact, Taranto supported the Peloponnesian side against Athens in the Peloponnesian War, refused anchorage and water to Athens in 415 BC, and even sent ships to help the Peloponnesians, after the Athenian disaster in Sicily. On the other side, Athens supported the Messapians, in order to counter Taranto's power.

Map of the Greek colonies in Southern Italy (Magna Graecia)

In 432 BC, after several years of war, Taranto signed a peace treaty with the Greek colony of Thurii; both cities contributed to the foundation of the colony of Heraclea, which rapidly fell under Taranto's control. In 367 BC Carthage and the Etruscans signed a pact to counter Taranto's power in southern Italy.

Under the rule of its greatest statesman, strategist and army commander-in-chief, the philosopher and mathematician Archytas, Taranto reached its peak power and wealth; it was the most important city of the Magna Graecia, the main commercial port of southern Italy, it produced and exported goods to and from motherland Greece and it had the biggest army and the largest fleet in southern Italy. However, with the death of Archytas in 347 BC, the city started a slow, but ineluctable decline. Though the city’s hoplite infantry and cavalry continued to enjoy a notable reputation, its restrictive policies of citizenship meant that Taras could not match the numbers of first the Apulian tribes, then the Samnites, and finally the Romans.

In 343 BC Taranto appealed for aid against the barbarians to its mother city Sparta, in the face of aggression by the Bruttian League. In 342 BC, Archidamus III, king of Sparta, arrived in Italy with an army and a fleet to fight the Lucanians and their allies. In 338 BC, during the Battle of Manduria, the Spartan and Tarentine armies were defeated in front of the walls of Manduria (nowadays in province of Taranto), and Archidamus was killed.

In 333 BC, still troubled by their Italic neighbors, the Tarentines called the Epirotic king Alexander Molossus to fight the Bruttii, Samnites, and Lucanians, but he was later defeated and killed in the Battle of Pandosia (near Cosenza) in 331 BC. In 320 BC, a peace treaty was signed between Taranto and the Samnites. In 304 BC, Taranto was attacked by the Lucanians and asked for the help of Agathocles tyrant of Syracuse, king of Sicily. Agathocles arrived in southern Italy and took control of Bruttium (present-day Calabria), but was later recalled to Syracuse. In 303-302 BC Cleonymus of Sparta established an alliance with Taranto against the Lucanians, and fought against them.

=== Wars against Rome ===
==== First confrontations ====
At the beginning of the 3rd century BC Rome's increasing power started to frighten Taranto, especially in terms of mastery of the sea and control over the Greek colonies in Magna Graecia. After the surrender of the Samnites in 290 BC, the Romans founded many colonies in Apulia and Lucania. Furthermore, some of the city-states in Magna Graecia, such as Rhegion, Croton and Locri, asked Rome for military help because of the wars that they were having with their neighbours. Also, Thurii, which was located on the Gulf of Taranto and under Tarentine rule, asked Rome for help in 282 BC, after being attacked by Lucanians. This situation inevitably led to a conflict between Taranto and Rome, since Taranto felt Rome was interfering in the affairs of the Greek colonies in southern Italy, which the Tarentines considered under their dominion.

Two political parties were present at the time within Taranto. The democrats, led by Philocharis or Ainesias, were dominant; they were against Rome, because they knew that if the Romans entered Taranto, the Greeks would have lost their independence. The second faction in Taranto were the aristocrats, led by Agis; they had lost their power when Taranto had become a democracy, and did not oppose surrendering to Rome as it would increase their own influence in the city, by reducing the power of the democrats. However, the aristocrats did not want to surrender openly to Rome and become unpopular with the population.

At that time, Taranto had the most powerful naval forces in Italy, and hastened to come to an agreement with Rome that stated that Roman ships could not enter into the Gulf of Taranto.

In 282 BC, Rome sent a fleet under Admiral Lucius Valerius, carrying troops to garrison Thurii, but ten ships were caught in a tempest and arrived in the sea off Taranto during a holy day (the festival of Dionysus). This angered the Tarentines, who considered it a hostile act openly in conflict with the pact, which forbade the Gulf of Taranto to Roman ships, and responded by attacking the Roman fleet: the Tarentine navy sunk four Roman ships, and captured a fifth. According to some historians, Tarentine aristocrats had been asked by the Roman commanders Publius Cornelius and Lucius Valerius to arrest and execute the democrats and their followers during the arrival of the Roman fleet, which would allow the aristocrats to lead the city and sign an alliance with Rome.

The army and fleet of Taranto moved to Thurii and helped the democrats there exile the aristocrats. The Roman garrison placed in Thurii withdrew.

==== Pyrrhic War ====
Most important places of the wars against Rome

Rome sent diplomats to Taranto, but the talks were broken off by the Tarentines: the Roman ambassador, Postumius, was insulted and mocked by Philonides, a member of the popular party. The Senate declared war on Taranto, and the Tarentines decided to call for help from King Pyrrhus of Epirus. In 281 BC, Roman legions, under the command of Lucius Aemilius Barbula, entered Taranto and plundered it. Taranto, with Samnite and Salentine reinforcements, then lost a battle against the Romans. After the battle, the Greeks chose Agis to sign a truce and begin diplomatic talks. These talks were also broken off when 3000 soldiers from Epirus under the command of Cineas entered the town. The Roman consul withdrew and suffered losses from attacks by the Greek ships.

Pyrrhus decided to help Taranto because he was in debt to them - they had earlier helped him conquer the island of Corcyra. He also knew that he could count on help from the Samnites, Lucanians, Bruttii, and some Illyrian tribes. His ultimate goal was to conquer Macedon, but he did not have enough money to recruit soldiers. He planned to help Taranto, then go to Sicily and attack Carthage. After winning a war against Carthage and capturing southern Italy, he would have enough money to organise a strong army and capture Macedon.

Before he left Epirus, he borrowed some phalanxes from the Macedonian king, and demanded ships and money from the Syrian king Antiochus and from Antigonus II Gonatas . The Egyptian king also promised to send 9000 soldiers and 50 war elephants. These forces had to defend Epirus while Pyrrhus was gone. He recruited soldiers in Greece as well, as the Greek cities wanted to avoid a war with Epirus, even though they were unconcerned with the Greek colonies in Italy. In the spring of 280 BC, Pyrrhus landed without losses in Italy. He had 20,000 infantry (pikemen from Epirus and Macedonia, mercenary hoplites from around Greece, and peltasts), 500 slingers, 2,000 archers, 3,000 elite cavalry from Thessaly, and 20 war elephants.

After hearing of Pyrrhus' arrival in Italy, the Romans mobilized eight legions with auxiliaries, totalling about 80 000 soldiers, and divided into four armies. Valerius Levinus marched to Taranto, with an army of 30,000 legionnaires and auxiliaries. Pyrrhus moved from Taranto to meet its allies, but met with the Roman army, and decided to fight it next to Heraclea. The Battle of Heraclea was won by Pyrrhus, but the casualties were very high. Upon his arrival in Italy, Pyrrhus thought that the Roman army would be easily defeated by his Macedonian phalanx. However, Roman legions proved to be stronger than expected. Furthermore, Rome was able to raise a large number of legions, while Pyrrhus was far from home and had only a handful of veterans with him.

Pyrrhus moved towards Rome with the intention of rallying the peoples ruled by the Romans and conquering the city, but he had no success in this and was forced to return to Apulia.

In 279 BC, Pyrrhus defeated another Roman army in the Battle of Asculum (modern Ascoli Satriano, Foggia), again with many casualties. Most of the men Pyrrhus had brought over from Epirus were disabled or dead, including nearly all of his officers and friends. Recruiting would be impossible, and his allies were unreliable. The Romans, on the other hand, quickly replaced their losses with fresh men, and with every defeat, the Romans were becoming more determined to win. At the same time, Pyrrhus received a proposal from the Sicilian Greek colonies of Syracuse, Leontini, and Agrigentum, to lead them in a war against the Carthaginians, and left Italy for Sicily, suspending the war against Rome, and leaving a garrison in Taranto.

The Tarentines recalled Pyrrhus in 276 BC, and the king gladly returned from his Sicilian adventure. The war against Rome revamped, but this time Pyrrhus was matched by the Romans in the Battle of Beneventum (275 BC) and elected to give up his Italian campaign as Antigonus II of Macedon would not send him reinforcements. After six years, Pyrrhus returned to Epirus, with only 8,500 men: a garrison was left in Taranto, under the command of Pyrrhus' vice-commander Milon.

The Romans conquered the city in 272 BC, by treachery of the Greek soldiers, and demolished the defensive walls of the city. Thirty thousand of the Greek inhabitants were sold as slaves and many works of art were carried off to Rome.

==== Second Punic War ====
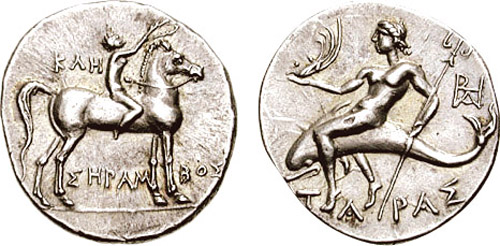
Coin struck during the Punic occupation. The images are from the classical Tarentine coins, but the coin follows Punic coinage standards.

During the Second Punic War, the Romans heavily garrisoned the city for fear that it might go over to Hannibal. However, a group of Tarentine hostages held in Rome were caught trying to escape and thrown from the Tarpeian Rock as traitors; probably because of this, anti-Roman feeling in the city increased greatly. Two members of the pro-Carthage faction in the city enabled Hannibal to enter the city in 212 BC, although he was not able to capture the citadel of the city which was defended by Roman troops. Because of Hannibal's failure to capture the citadel, he was not able to use Tarentum as a major port and staging area for the invasion of Italy. The army was forced to portage boats across the city in order to sail from the bay. The city supported his war against Rome, but in 209 BC the commander of a Bruttian force betrayed the city to the Romans. Indiscriminate slaughter ensued and among the victims were the Bruttians who had betrayed the city. Afterwards thirty thousand of the Greek inhabitants were sold as slaves. Tarentum's art treasures, including the statue of Nikè (Victory) were carried off to Rome.

== Roman Republic and Empire ==
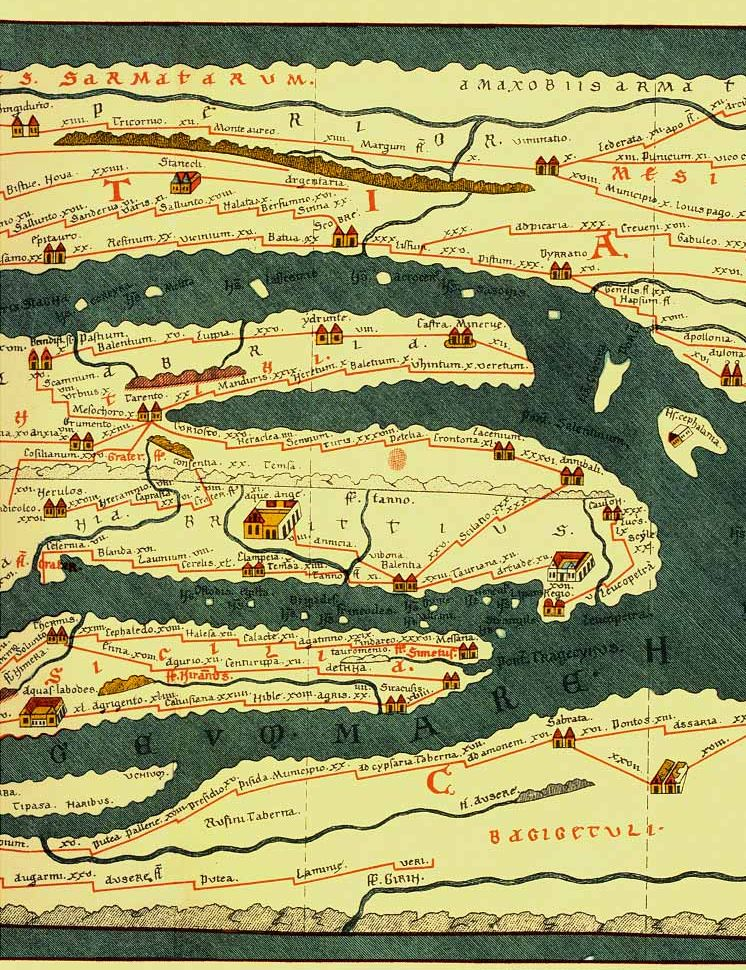
Portion of the Tabula Peutingeriana, a Roman map of the Empire, showing Tarentum.

Even in Antiquity, Taranto was renowned for its beautiful climate. Taranto's poets Apollodorus and Clinias, painter Zeuxis and mathematician Archytas were renowned in the ancient world.

In 122 BC a Roman colony was founded next to Taranto, according to the law proposed by Gaius Sempronius Gracchus. The colony was named Neptunia, after the Roman sea god Neptune, worshipped by the Tarentines. The Roman colony was separate from the Greek city, and populated by Roman colonists, but it was later unified with the main centre when Taranto become a municipium, in 89 BC.

In 37 BC Marcus Antonius, Octavianus and Lepidus signed the Treaty of Tarentum, extending the Second Triumvirate until 33 BC.

Tarentum had a municipal law, Lex municipii Tarenti; a partial copy inscribed on bronze plates was discovered in 1894 by Luigi Viola, and is now at the Museo Archeologico Nazionale of Naples.

During the late Republic and all the Roman Empire, Taranto was a simple provincial city (Prefecture of Italy, Diocese of Italia suburbicaria, Apulia et Calabria province). Emperor Trajanus tried to counter the reduction of the population giving the Tarentine lands to his veterans, but this initiative failed. Taranto followed the story of Italy during the late Empire, with Visigothic attacks and Ostrogothic domination.

== Byzantine, Lombard, Arab, and Norman Middle eras ==
=== Byzantine and Lombard dominations ===
In the wake of the Gothic wars, Taranto was reconquered by the Byzantine Empire in 540 and was ruled by them until the Lombards (or Longobards) of the Duchy of Benevento captured it in 662.

In spring 663 Constans II arrived at Taranto with a fleet and an army and defeated the Lombards: it was the first time a Byzantine Emperor had arrived in Italy with an army. Next he conquered Apulia and went to Rome to meet Pope Vitalian.

After the Emperor returned to Constantinople, a new war between the Byzantines and the Duchy of Beneventum started. Duke Grimoaldus conquered northern Apulia and his son Romoaldus, in 686, took Taranto and Brindisi from the imperial army.

In the 8th century, North African Muslim Berbers started to raid Taranto and southern Italy; the Saracen menace lasted up to the 11th century.

=== Emirate of Sicily domination ===
The first years of the 9th century were characterized by the internal fights that weakened the Lombard power. In 840, a Lombard prince, who was held prisoner in Taranto, was freed by his partisans, brought to Benevento, and made duke. At the same time, the Siculo muslims took control of Taranto, exploiting the weak Lombard control. Taranto became a Siculo stronghold and privileged harbour for forty years. It was from here that ships loaded with prisoners sailed to the Sicilian ports, where the prisoners were sold in the slave market. In the same 840, a Siculo fleet left Taranto, defeated in the Gulf of Taranto a Venetian fleet of 60 ships, summoned by the emperor Theophilus, and entered the Adriatic Sea, sacking the coastal cities.

In 850, four Siculo columns departed from Taranto and Bari to sack Campania, Apulia, Calabria and Abruzzi. In 854, Taranto was again the base for a Siculo raid, led by Abbas-ibn-Faid, which sacked the Lombard Principality of Salerno. Two Arab fleets arrived to Taranto, in 871 and later in 875, carrying the troops which sacked Campania and Apulia. The situation of southern Italy worried Emperor Basil I, who decided to fight the Siculo muslims and take the harbour of Taranto from themselves.

In 880, two Byzantine armies, led by generals Prokopios and Leo Apostyppes, and a fleet commanded by the admiral Nasar, took Taranto from the Arabs, ending a forty years dominion. Among the first actions taken by Apostyppes was the enslavement and deportation of the Latin-Longobard original inhabitants and the import of Greek colonists, in order to increase the population. Taranto became one of the most important cities in the theme of Longobardia, the Byzantine possession in southern Italy. In 882 the Siculo muslims, having been invited by Duke Radelchis to assist him, captured it and held it for some time.

=== Return under Byzantine rule ===
In 928, a Fatimid fleet under Sabir al-Fata sacked the city, enslaving and deporting to North Africa all the survivors. Taranto had no inhabitants, until the Byzantine re-conquest in 967. The Byzantine emperor Nicephorus II Phocas understood the importance of a strong military presence and harbour in southern Italy, and rebuilt the city. He added several military fortifications, and made Taranto a stronghold of Roman resistance against the uprising Norman power in south Italy. However, the weakness of the Roman local government exposed Taranto to other Saracen raids. In 977, it was attacked by Saracens led by Abn'l-Kàsim, who took many prisoners and sacked the city, burning some parts of Taranto. In 982, Emperor Otto II started his war against Saracens from Taranto, but he was defeated by Abn'l-Kàsim in the Battle of Stilo (Calabria).

=== Norman conquest ===
The 11th century was characterized by a bloody struggle between Normans and Byzantines for the rule over the Tarentine and Bariot lands. In May 1060, Robert Guiscard conquered the city, but in October Taranto was re-occupied by the Byzantine army. After three years, in 1063, the Norman count Geoffrey, son of Petron I, entered in Taranto, but he was obliged to flee from it on the arrival of the Byzantine admiral Michael Maurikas. Taranto was finally conquered by the Normans: the sons of Petron elected the first Norman archbishop, Drogo, in 1071, and prepared a fleet to conquer Durazzo.

== Feudal Principality of Taranto (1088-1465) ==
Taranto became the capital of a Norman principality, whose first ruler was Robert Guiscard's son, Bohemond of Taranto, who obtained it as result of succession dispute: his father repudiated his first wife, Bohemond's mother, and had Roger Borsa, his son by his second wife Sikelgaita, succeed him as Duke of Apulia. Bohemond was compensated with Taranto and lands that covered almost all of the heel of Apulia. The principality of Taranto, during its 377 years of history, was sometimes a powerful and almost independent feudal fief of the Kingdom of Sicily (and later of Naples), sometimes only a title, often given to the heir to the crown or to the husband of a reigning queen. When the House of Anjou was divided, Taranto fell to Durazzo (1394–1463).

Ferdinand I of Naples, also known as King Ferrante, united the Principality of Taranto to the Kingdom of Naples, at the death of his wife, Isabella of Taranto (Clermont). The principality ended, but the kings of Naples continued giving the title of Prince of Taranto to their sons, firstly to the future Alfonso II of Naples, Duke of Calabria, eldest son of Isabella.

== From Renaissance to Napoleon ==
In March 1502, the Spanish fleet of king Ferdinand II of Aragon, allied to Louis XII of France, seized the port and conquered Taranto.

In 1504 King Ferdinand III valiantly defended this extremity of his kingdom, but had to cede it to the Spanish general Consalvo de Cordoba.

In 1570 Admiral Giovanni Andrea Doria set his fleet of 49 galleys in Mar Grande to repair and supply his ships. Among the people on the fleet was Miguel de Cervantes. The fleet later united with the other parts of the Christian League, and in 1571 defeated the Turkish fleet at Lepanto: also some Tarentine nobles took part in the battle.

In 1647 the insurrection of Masaniello in Naples reached also Taranto. The city joined also the Parthenopaean Republic of 1799, from 8 February to 8 March of that year, though again unluckily.

In 1746 Taranto had 11,526 inhabitants. All of them were packed in the small island, among a high number of religious institutes and churches. Francesco Antonio Calo', a Tarentine nobleman, started in 1765 with two statues the Mysteries of the Holy Week celebrations. They are today the most important and attended event of Taranto.

After the defeat of Ferdinand IV of Naples at Monteregio and the subsequent Peace of Florence, in 1801 the French general Jean-de-dieu Soult occupied with 13,000 soldiers the provinces of Bari, Lecce and the harbour of Taranto. Napoleon wanted to build a stronghold to keep under pression the British base of Malta. On 23 April 1801, 6,000 French soldiers of the Armée d'observation du midi entered in Taranto (20.000 inhabitants at the time) and fortified it in order to obtain "a sort of Gibitrair" (Napoleon). On 25 March 1802, France and Great Britain signed the Treaty of Amiens, which required France to leave South Italy, but after UK declaration of war against France, the Armée d'observation du midi returned to Taranto, under the command of general Laurent Gouvion de Saint Cyr, on 23 May 1803. Among the French officers in Taranto, there is also the novelist Pierre Choderlos de Laclos, artillery general and fortification expert, who died in Taranto on 5 September 1803. On 15 February, Joseph Bonaparte became King of Naples, and on 3 May visited the fortifications of Taranto. The presence of the French troops and defensive works benefited the Tarentine economy. In 1805 the Russian fleet, allied with the British, remained there for several months.

On March 30, 1806, Bonaparte's decree created Tarente (the French name for the city) one of six hereditary duchés grand-fiefs in the satellite kingdom of Naples, awarded to maréchal MacDonald in 1809 (line extinguished 1912).

With the fall of Napoleon and the defeat of Joachim Murat at the battle of Tolentino, Southern Italy and Taranto returned under the Bourbon dynasty's rule, forming the Kingdom of the Two Sicilies.

== Since Italian unification ==
On 9 September 1860, Taranto became part of the temporary government founded by Giuseppe Garibaldi after his conquest of the Two Sicilies kingdom. In the following year, all Southern Italy was annexed to the Savoy dynasty's Kingdom of Piemonte-Sardinia, which became the Kingdom of Italy. In those years Taranto had 27,000 inhabitants.

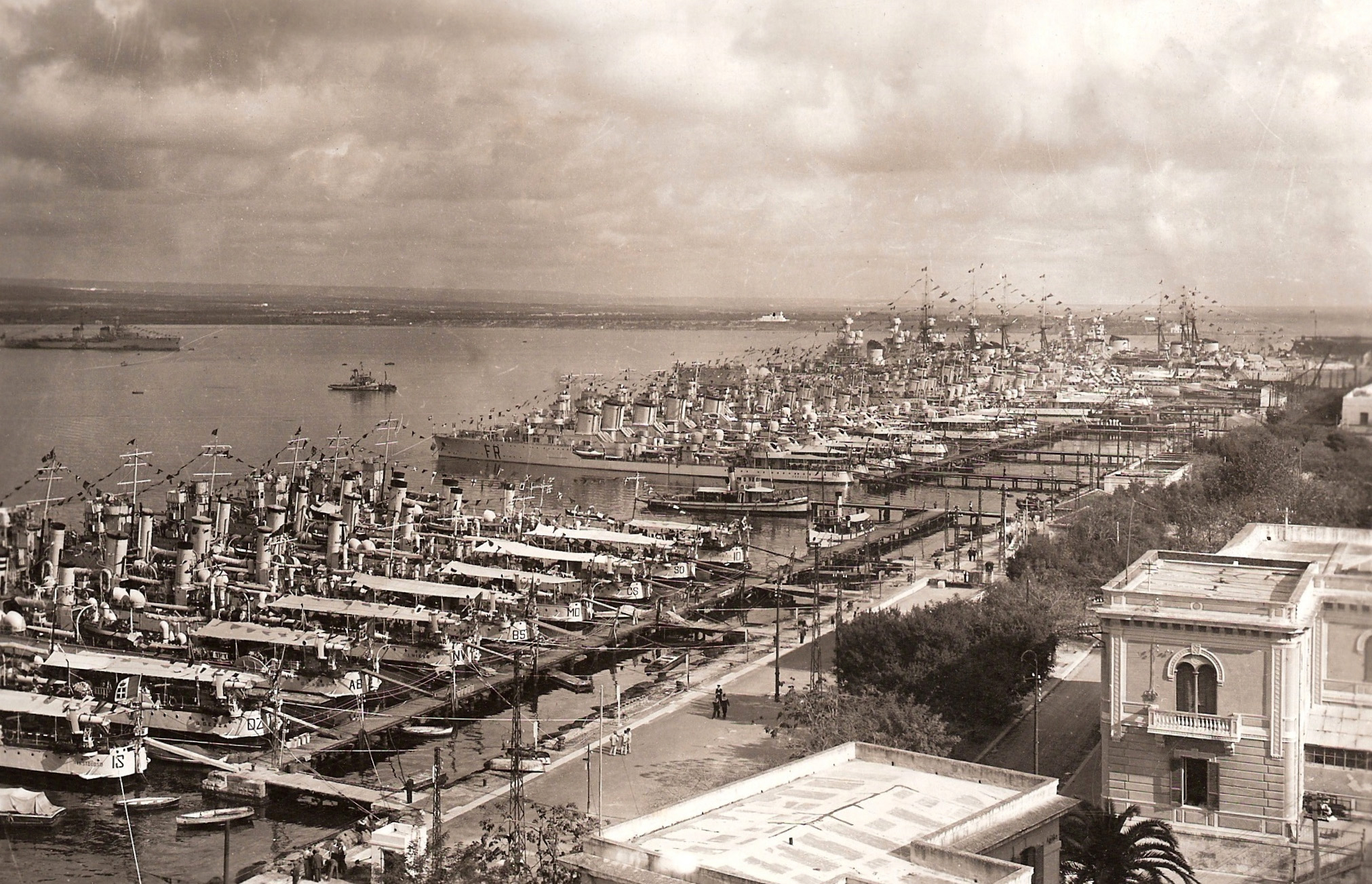
Taranto naval base for the Italian Royal Navy's First Squadron (Note: photo is from the 1930s).

Between May and June 1866, the newly formed Regia Marina — the Kingdom of Italy navy resulted from the unification of Sardinian, Neapolitan-Sicilian, Tuscan and Pontificial navies — was collected in Taranto harbour, because of the imminent declaration of war against Austria (Third Independence War). On 21 June, one day too late to allow Admiral Carlo di Persano to receive Tarentine honorary citizenship, the fleet left for the Adriatic Sea. After the defeat of the Italian fleet at Lissa, Persano was put under trial for incompetence and cowardice, and his easy days in Taranto was indicated as part of his bad behaviour.

During World War I, Taranto was a base for Regia Marina warships. On 2 August 1916, Leonardo da Vinci, a Conte di Cavour-class battleship, sank after alleged sabotage.

On the night of 11 November 1940, during World War II, the Italian ships, which were at anchor in Mar Grande and Mar Piccolo, were severely damaged by British naval forces in what became known as the Battle of Taranto.

British forces landed near the port on September 9, 1943 as part of the Allied invasion (Operation Slapstick).

== See also ==
- Greek coinage of Italy and Sicily
- Archbishopric of Taranto
- Timeline of Taranto

== Sources ==
- Giuliano Lapesa - "Taranto dall'Unità al 1940. Industria, demografia, politica" - LED Edizioni Universitarie - Milano, 2011 - ISBN 978-88-7916-485-6
