= Opis of Messapia =

King of Messapians

Opis was a king of the Messapians. Opis reigned during the first half of the 5th century BC and participated in the Iapygian-Tarentine Wars.

== Military activities ==
A decade after the catastrophic defeat of Taras at Kailia in 473 BC, the Tarentines were set for battle, this time perhaps on their own terms near the Iapygian city of Hyria. In 460 BC the Tarentines, apparently confident enough in their own numbers to match up against an Iapygian force alone, were opposed by a much smaller enemy than the massive army brought against Taras thirteen years earlier. Opis had come to aid the Peucetians in the battle but this time the colonial Greek hoplites, backed again by a formidable cavalry arm, proved superior to the Iapygians. In the decisive battle Opis himself was killed. This battle was a fairly even match-up of armored troops, the Peucetians had about 3,000 men and Opis' army numbered some 4,000 spearmen. This victory ended Tarentine conflicts with the Iapygians for a full generation.

Opis is only known from Tarentine dedications at Delphi. In a group of statues, Taras celebrates its victory over Opis and the Peucetians.
