= Iapygian–Tarentine wars =

Ancient military conflicts

Italy in 400 BC.

The Iapygian–Tarentine wars were a set of conflicts and wars between the Greek colony of Taras and the three Iapygian peoples, the Messapians, Peucetians and Daunians.

Conflicts started immediately after the foundation of Taras in 706 BC over domination of the fertile adjacent plains in southern Italy. The expansion of Taras was limited to the coast because of the resistance of the populations of inner Apulia. In 473 BC, Taras signed an alliance with Rhegion, to counter the Messapians, Peucetians, and Lucanians, but the joint armies of the Tarentines and Rhegines were defeated near Kailia, in what Herodotus claims to be the greatest slaughter of Greeks in his knowledge, with 3,000 Reggians and uncountable Tarentines killed. In 466 BC, Taranto was again defeated by the Iapygians; according to Aristotle, who praises its government, there were so many aristocrats killed that the democratic party was able to get the power, to remove the monarchy, inaugurate a democracy, and expel the Pythagoreans.

In c.440 BC the Messapian city-state of Brentesion entered into an alliance with Thourioi. Their combined army had a leadership advantage in the form of Cleandridas, an exiled Spartan general who had been banished from the Peloponnese for accepting an Athenian bribe as an advisor of the Spartan king Pleistoanax. Taras supported the Peloponnesian side against Athens in the Peloponnesian War, refused anchorage and water to Athens in 415 BC, and even sent ships to help the Peloponnesians, after the Athenian disaster in Sicily. On the other side, Athens supported the Messapians, in order to counter Taranto power.

After 330 BC the Messapians joined forces with the Tarentines against an even greater force, that of Rome. The alliances with Taras and with Cleonimus of Sparta in 304 BC was an anti-Roman campaign. Thus towards the end of the fourth century Rome had become a common enemy for both the Iapygians and the Tarentines, even as far as ending the prolonged battles and causing them to make an alliance.

== Prelude ==
The three Iapygian tribes were the Messapians, Daunians and the Peucetians. By around 500 BC the Messapians were organised into a confederation of city-states. In 706 BC Taras was founded by Dorian immigrants as the only Spartan colony. From its foundation the city had contested control of the areas rich Sallentine Peninsula with the Iapygians. The development of the city was restricted to the shoreline since the residents Iapygians resisted the rule of Taras. Taranto increased its power, becoming a commercial power and a sovereign city of Magna Graecia, ruling over the Greek colonies in southern Italy. Conflict between the Iapygians and Taras was inevitable, resulting in a series of conflicts and wars during the 5th and 4th centuries. These battles were only the latest outbreak of violence in a long-running altercation that had been going on since the arrival of the Greeks in the region in the late 8th century BC.

== 5th century BC ==
The first of the wars started with a defeat of the Iapygians around 500 BC. In c.490 BC the Messapians moved against the Tarantines with a composite force of around 8,000 men including shield infantry, skirmishers, and their vaunted cavalry. According to Herodotus (iii 136), around 492 BC king Aristophilides ruled over the city. The Tarantines appear to have represented their Spartan roots well in this battle despite being outnumbered. Along with 4,000 hoplites and 1,000 light infantry in support, the Tarantines also employed both light and wealthy sword-wielding cavalry, due to their establishment of a feudal-like system of land ownership. Outside the walls of the city the Tarantines withstood not only the initial skirmishing, but also both their Messapians cavalry superiority and the inevitable highland charge. The Tarantines claimed victory, and continued to solidify their presence in Magna Graecia as the region’s leading Greek power. After their crushing defeat the Messapians would not challenge the polis of Taras again for a generation, but would take care to learn important lessons from this first major encounter.

=== Battle of Kailia - 473 BC ===
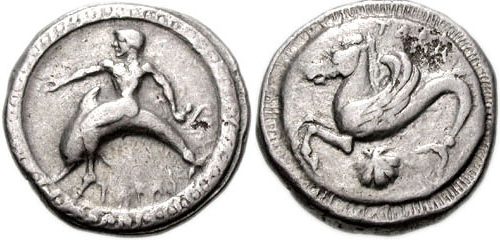
Tarentum: 500-480 BC. AR Nomos (21mm, 8.02 g, 4h).

The conflict arose once more in 473 BC and this time it took on truly frightening proportions, culminating as the fiercest battle between the two. Once again the Iapygian states challenged Taras for control of the resource-laden Sallentine Peninsula. However, this time the Tarentines faced the might of all Iapygians, rather than just the Messapians they had been able to handle in 490 BC. Diodorus claimed that 20,000 Iapygian warriors converged on Kailia, south-east of Taras. Each one of the three Iapygian states 2-4,000 shock troops, all carrying a short spear and oval shield and most with both a pectoral and a greave on the left leg as well. Peltasts, slingers and cavalry brought the Iapygians up to around 18,000 fighting warriors while the 2,000 remaining were composed of allies, the Lucanians. Therefore, the Iapygians closed on the Tarentines with 9,000 heavy footmen, 7,000 skirmishers and 4,000 riders. Taras signed an alliance with Rhegion, to counter the attack. Taras responded with perhaps over 5,000 hoplites, psiloi, and cavalry of its own, plus a smaller complementary force from Rhegion. Both sides loosed a hail of slingers shot and javelins as the Iapygians made a screaming charge into the solid row of spears and polished shields fronting the phalanx.

The battle went on for some time and if Diodorus's brief account is accurate, took a high cost on both side before reaching a resolution. In the end the hoplites failed to break through the superior Iapygians which destroyed the combined Tarentine/Rhegian force who fled in different directions, in what Herodotus described as “the greatest slaughter of Greeks that is known” with 3,000 Reggians and uncountable Tarentines killed. It has been considered also that the Messapians advanced as far as Rhegion. Despite the Iapygian victory at the Battle of Kailia, both Taras and Rhegion continued to thrive after this defeat, though it did shake the aristocratic-led government of Taras to its foundations, creating enough dissatisfaction to have it soon replaced with a democracy. A great deal of territory was at stake and the results of this actions settled the land dispute for most of the generation.

The Iapygians held full military dominance with another victory in 466 BC. According to Aristotle ( Politica, v 1303a), there were so many aristocrats killed, that the democratic party was able to get the power, to remove the monarchy, inaugurate a democracy, and the expel the Pythagoreans. A decade after the catastrophic defeat of Taras at Kailia in 473 BC, the Tarentines were set for battle, this time perhaps on their own terms near the Iapygian city of Hyria.

=== Battle of Hyria - 460 BC ===
In 460 BC the Tarentines, apparently confident enough in their own numbers to match up against an Iapygian force alone, were opposed by a much smaller enemy than the massive army brought against Taras thirteen years earlier. Opis, king of the Messapian State had come to aid the Peucetians in the battle but this time the colonial Greek hoplites, backed again by a formidable cavalry arm, proved superior to the Iapygians. In the decisive battle Opis himself was killed. This battle was a fairly even match-up of armoured troops, the Peucetians had about 3,000 men and Opis' army numbered some 4,000 spear-men. This victory ended Tarentine conflicts with the Iapygians for a full generation.

=== Brindisi-Thurii alliance ===
In c.440 BC the Messapian city-state of Brindisi entered into an alliance with Thurii. The Brindisi-Thurii army had a leadership advantage in the form of Cleandridas, an exiled Spartan general who had been banished from the Peloponnese for accepting an Athenian bribe as an advisor of the Spartan king Pleistoanax. The combined force of Thurians and Messapians met the Tarantines somewhere between the two colonial poleis, likely in the disputed area of Siris. The composite force was smaller in hoplite numbers than the Tarentines, but likely with more cavalry and light troops than their opponents. The Messapians and Thurii armies failed to penetrate the Tarentine army and were defeated. Despite the defeat, Messapian and Thurii were in alliance again in 433 and 432 BC against the Lucanian invasions.

=== Peloponnesian War ===
Messapia and Taras had been both engulfed in the Peloponnesian Wars. Athens supported Artas of Messapia against Taras. For the Athenians to align themselves with Artas was an anti-Tarentine and thus an anti-Spartan act. The Athenian cultivation of Artas was therefore a good way to create difficulties for the Spartan colony of Taras. In 418 BC Artas renewed his old friendship with Athens at the time when Athens was beginning its operations in Sicily and was a proxenos of Athens. In 413 BC Artas supplied the Athenians with one hundred and fifty javelin-throwers for the war against Syracuse. Artas made the Messapian State into a major military and political centre in the affairs of Magna Graecia.

== 4th century BC ==
In the 4th century BC the Messapian-Lucanian alliance in 356 BC led to the conquest of Eraclea and Metaponto and then the subsequent intervention in support of Taras by the Spartan king Archidamus III, who would ultimately find his death in battle just below the walls of the Messapian city of Manduria in 338 BC. Between 333 BC and 330 BC, the king of Epirus Alexander the Molossian, called upon by Taras claimed a victory over the Messapians. After his death in 330 BC the Messapians joined forces with the Tarentines against an even greater force, that of Rome. The alliances with Taras and with Cleonymus of Sparta in 304 BC was an anti-Roman campaign. Thus towards the end of the fourth century Rome had become a common enemy for both the Iapygians and the Tarentines, even as far as ending the prolonged battles and causing them to make an alliance.

== See also ==
- Illyrian warfare
