= Manduriano =

Dialect of the Sicilian language

Manduriano is a dialect of the Salentino, spoken by the majority of the inhabitants of Manduria, in southern Apulia.

== Vocabulary and expressions ==
„Quannu lu ciucciu no mboli nci bei, ti macari cu fišchi. Ital.: Se l'asino non vuole bere, puoi fischiare quanto credi.”

„Erva ca no buei ntra lu uertu ti nasci. Ital.: L'erba che non vuoi nell'orto ti nasce.”

„Quannu lu sorgi no arria allu casu, tici ca puzza. Ital.: quando il topo non arriva al formaggio dice che puzza.”

„La jaddina faci lu ueu e lu jaddu canta. Ital.: La gallina fa l'uovo e il gallo canta.”

„Lu mboi chiama curnutu lu ciucciu. Ital.: Il bue chiama cornuto l'asino.”
