= Phalanthus (founder of Tarentum) =

Divine hero in Greek mythology

In Greek mythology and history, Phalanthus (Ancient Greek: Φάλανθος, Phálanthos) was the semi-legendary leader of the Spartan Partheniae and the founder of Taranto in Magna Graecia.

== Revolt in Sparta ==
The Epeunacti, a class of Helots who either slept with the widows of Spartans when Sparta had a manpower shortage because of war casualties or outright replaced the fallen Spartans as soldiers, had conspired with Phalanthus and the Partheniae ("sons of virgins", sons of unmarried Spartan women and Perioeci, free men, but not citizens of Sparta) to revolt in the marketplace as soon as Phalanthus, in his full armor, pulled his helmet over his forehead, but a certain man revealed to the ephors what was about to happen. Most of the ephors believed they should kill Phalanthus, but Phalanthus's lover Agathiadas asserted that if they did so, they would plunge Sparta into the greatest civil war, in which, if they won, victory would be futile, and if they lost, they would destroy their homeland. Agathiadas therefore advised that the herald publicly proclaim that Phalanthus should leave his helmet as it was. This was done, and the Partheniae, led by Phalanthus, abandoned the undertaking and began to seek reconciliation.

The attack was to take place during the Hyacinthia festival in Amyclae, when the games were being celebrated.

== Founding Tarentum ==
Tarentum was a colony of the Lacedaemonians founded by Phalanthus. When setting out to found a colony, Phalanthus received an oracle from Delphi, declaring that when he felt rain under a cloudless sky (aethra), then he would conquer a territory and a city.

At first, he did not examine the oracle personally nor inform any of the oracle interpreters, but came to Italy with his ships. But when, although he had won victories over the barbarians, he could neither take a city nor become lord of a territory, he remembered the oracle and thought that the god Apollo had predicted an impossibility. For it could never rain from a clear, cloudless sky. When he was in despair, his wife, who had accompanied him from home, placed her husband's head between her knees and began to remove the lice. And it happened that the wife wept at seeing her husband's fortunes waning.

As her tears streamed down and wet Phalanthus's head, he understood the meaning of the oracle, for his wife's name was Aethra. And so, that night, he took Tarentum from the barbarians, the largest and most prosperous city on the coast. It is said that the hero Taras was the son of Poseidon and a nymph of the region, and that both the city and the river received their names, Taras, in his honor.

The Tarentines used to send tithes to Delphi, derived from the spoils taken from the Peucetians, a non-Greek people. One of the offerings was the work of Onatas of Aegina and Ageladas of Argos, and consisted of statues of soldiers on foot and on horseback. Opis, king of the Iapygians, an ally of the Peucetians, was depicted dead in battle, and upon his prostrate body lay the heroes Taras and Phalanthus of Lacedaemon, near whom was a dolphin, for it is said that, before reaching Italy, Phalanthus was shipwrecked in the Crissaean sea and was brought ashore by a dolphin, as if he were a second Taras, who was also rescued from a shipwreck by a dolphin sent by his father Poseidon.

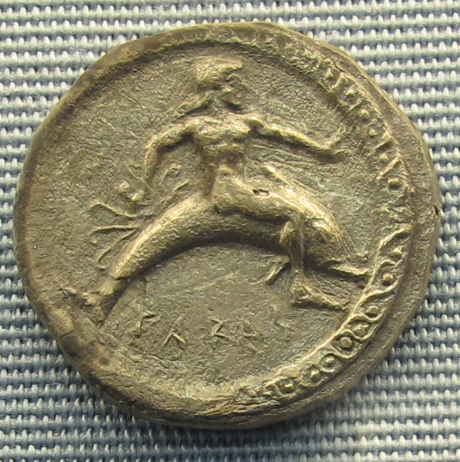
Inscription of Taras riding a dolphin on a coin, 500-473 BCE

== See also ==
- Phalanthus

== Sources ==
- Strabo, Geography (VI, 3, 2-3) =
  - Antiochus of Syracuse (FGrH 555F13) ;
  - Ephorus of Cumae (FGrH 70F216).

=== Bibliography ===
- (in French) Jean Bérard, La colonisation grecque de l'Italie méridionale et de la Sicile dans l'Antiquité. L'histoire et la légende, Paris, 1957, pp.162-175.
- (in French) Marinella Corsano, « Sparte et Tarente : le mythe de fondation d'une colonie », in Revue de l'histoire des religions 196, 2, 1979, pp.113-140.
- (in Italian) G. Maddoli, "Falanto spartiata", in Mélange de l'École française de Rome 95, 1983, pp.555-564.
- (in Italian) Domenico Musti, Strabone e la Magna Grecia, Padoue, 1988, pp.151-172.
- Irad Malkin, Myth and Territory in the Spartan Mediterranean, Cambridge, 1994
- (in French) Claudia Antonetti, "Phalanthos “entre Corinthe et Sycione”", in Dialogues d'histoire ancienne 22/1, 1996, pp.65-78
- Giovanna Bonivento Pupino, Noi Tarantini Figli di Parteni, in Ribalta di Puglia nn.8-9 marzo 2003 https://www.academia.edu/11088541/Noi_Tarantini_figli_di_Parteni
- Jonathan M. Hall, A History of the Archaic Greek World, ca. 1200-479 BCE, Blackwell, 2007, ISBN 0-631-22668-0, p111-114
