= Pomodorino di Manduria =

Tomato cultivar

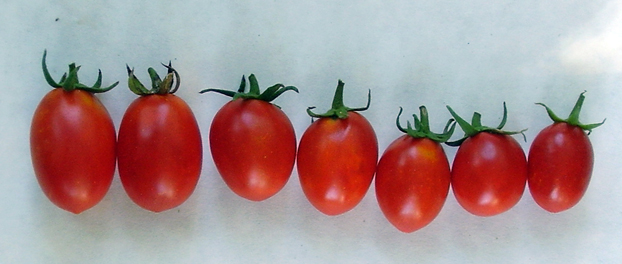

Tomato (Solanum lycopersicum)
- Color: Red

Pomodorino di Manduria is an ecotype of tomato typical of Manduria, Apulia.

== Characteristics ==
These tomatoes are cultivated in little plots of land (1/2–2 hectares). They are sown in March and harvested from the second half of June to the first days of September.

From some researches, it has been discovered that this ecotype is very resistant to the tomato spotted wilt orthotospovirus (TSWV) and with a graft that this tolerance is also transmitted to other varieties.

This table is about dried tomatoes in oil (for 100 grams):

Water	Protein	Fat	Carbohydrate	Fiber	Energy Value
57	5	14	17	5	214 kcal

== Designation of origin ==
The Italian Ministry of Agricultural, Food and Forestry Policies has recognised pomodorino di Manduria as a prodotto agroalimentare tradizionale (PAT) of Apulia.

== See also ==
- List of tomato cultivars
