= Messapian shepherds =

Shepherds in Greek mythology

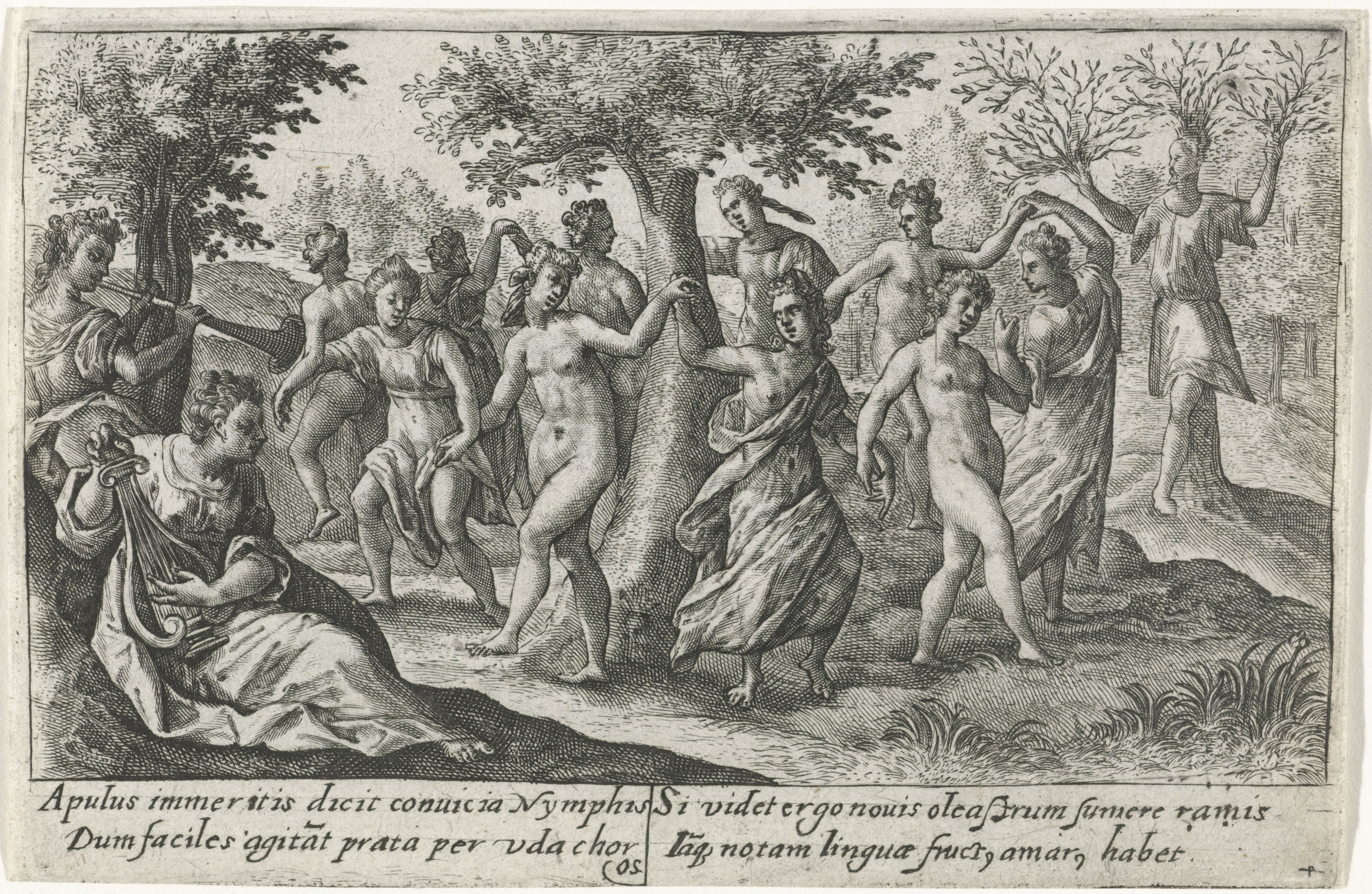
The Apulian shepherd is changed into olive tree, engraving by Crispijn van de Passe, ca. 1602.

In Greek and Roman mythology, the Messapian shepherds (Ancient Greek: Μεσσάπιοι) are the flock-tending inhabitants of Messapia (southern Apulia), an ancient region in the Italian Peninsula. They feature in two similar myths, where they offend local nymphs and are punished by them for their impiousness.

== Mythology ==
=== Shepherd ===
In one version of the myth, some nymphs, companions of Pan, lived in Messapia. A shepherd frightened them, and then proceeded to mock them by mimicking their dance with loutish leaps, crude shouts and rustic insults. He would not stop until they turned him into a wild olive tree, whose bitter berries still bear his sourness to this day.

=== Group of shepherds ===
In another variation of the myth, a group of Messapian shepherds declared themselves better dancers than the Epimelides nymphs (the nymphs that tend to the flocks), not realizing they were goddesses. The shepherds and the nymphs then agreed to settle the issue with a dancing competition. The shepherds danced in a crude and artless manner, while the movements of the nymphs were full of grace and beauty. Naturally the nymphs were proclaimed victors, and after winning they revealed their true identities to the hubristic shepherds. As punishment for their hubris, they turned them all into trees, which still groan and lament their fate to this day.

== See also ==
- Arachne
- Marsyas
- Pierides

== Bibliography ==
- Antoninus Liberalis, The Metamorphoses of Antoninus Liberalis translated by Francis Celoria (Routledge 1992). Online version at the Topos Text Project.
- Celoria, Francis (1992). The Metamorphoses of Antoninus Liberalis: A Translation with a Commentary. Routledge. ISBN 0-415-06896-7.
- Ovid (1916). Metamorphoses. Loeb Classical Library 43. Vol. II: Books 9-15. Translated by Frank Justus Miller, revised by G. P. Goold. Cambridge, MA: Harvard University Press.
