= Artas of Messapia =

5th-century BC king of the Messapians

Artas
- Reign: c. 430 BC – c. 413 BC
- Greek: Ἄρτας

Artas (Ancient Greek: Ἄρτας) or Artus (Ancient Greek: Ἄρτος) (ruled c. 430 – 413 BC) was a king of the Messapians. Artas was a strong ally of Athens during the Peloponnesian War and led an anti-Spartan campaign against Taras. Artas is also called Artos and in Greek is known as 'Bread-man'.

Artas made an alliance with Athens around 430 BC. The Iapygians placed the colony of Taras under constant pressure throughout the 5th century BC and indeed in the 4th century BC and the Hellenistic period as well. For the Athenians to align themselves with Artas was an anti-Tarentine and thus an anti-Spartan act. The Athenian cultivation of Artas was therefore a good way to create difficulties for the Spartan colony of Taras. His friendship was similar to the Athenian alliance with Metapontion.

In 418 BC, Artas renewed his old friendship with Athens at the time when Athens was beginning its Sicilian Expedition and was a proxenos of Athens. In 413 BC, Artas supplied the Athenians with one hundred and fifty javelin-throwers for the war against Syracuse. Artas made the Messapian state into a major military and political centre in the affairs of Magna Graecia.
