= Uva di Puglia =

Variety of grape

Grapes of Apulia
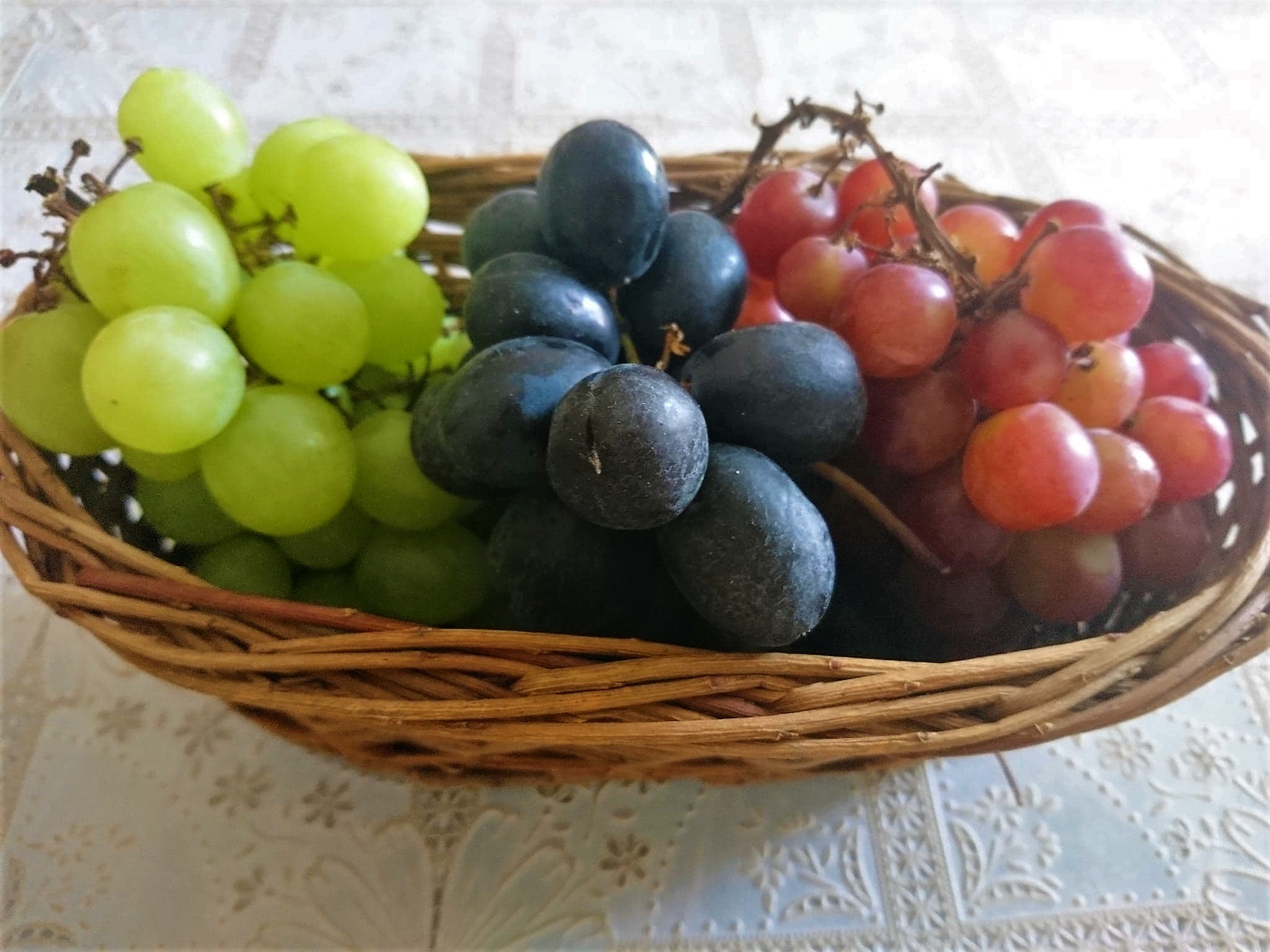
- Species: Vitis vinifera
- Cultivar group: Grapes cultivars
- Origin: Southern Mediterranean
- Cultivar group members: 'Italia'; 'Regina'; 'Victoria'; 'Michele Palieri'; 'Red Globe'

Uva di Puglia PGI is a variety of grape grown in the southern Italian region of Apulia (Puglia).

== Origins ==
Since it was part of the Magna Graecia, Apulia has ever been characterised by an important production of wine and table grape. Regarding the varieties included in Uva di Puglia PGI (Grapes of Apulia), the first evidence dates back to the end of the 19th century when Sergio Musci from Bisceglie started to successfully export it to the biggest cities of Northern Italy like Bologna, Milan and Turin. This type of grapes showed a great preservation of the organoleptic characteristics getting possible to export it to international markets without any problem. Therefore, at the beginning of the 20th century, Cav. Francesco De Villagomez from Bisceglie did the first exportation in Germany. In 1975, the export of Uva di Puglia amounted to 62.4% of the entire Italian table grape production destined for the foreign market. In 1985 it reached 74.1%.

== Fruit characteristics ==
The varieties included in Uva di Puglia PGI are several. Among the white grapes, there are the varieties: Italia, Regina and Victoria, straw yellow-coloured. They have seeds, the pulp is crunchy and, above all the variety Italia has a Moscato flavour. The red variety is the Michele Palieri characterised by a dark colour and a less sweet taste while the pink one, the Red Globe is very sweet and it is perfect for making desserts and jam. The harvesting period starts during the second decade of July for the Victoria and the Michele Palieri and between the third decade of July and August for the other varieties. This product is rich in sugar as glucose and mannose and in mineral salts like potassium, iron and phosphorus. It is also rich in B vitamins and in C and K vitamin.

== Geography ==
The area of production includes almost all the municipalities of Apulia under 330 m. above sea level (1082 ft.). Therefore, the villages of the area of the Subappennino Dauno are excluded. These lands are rich in calcium and potassium and are characterised by the mild climate also in winter.

== Consortium ==
Consorzio di Tutela Uva di Puglia IGP, Bari

- Apulia § Cuisine
- List of Italian products with protected designation of origin
