= Manduria =

Manduria Μανδουρία/Manduria (Greek)
- Comune
- Comune di Manduria
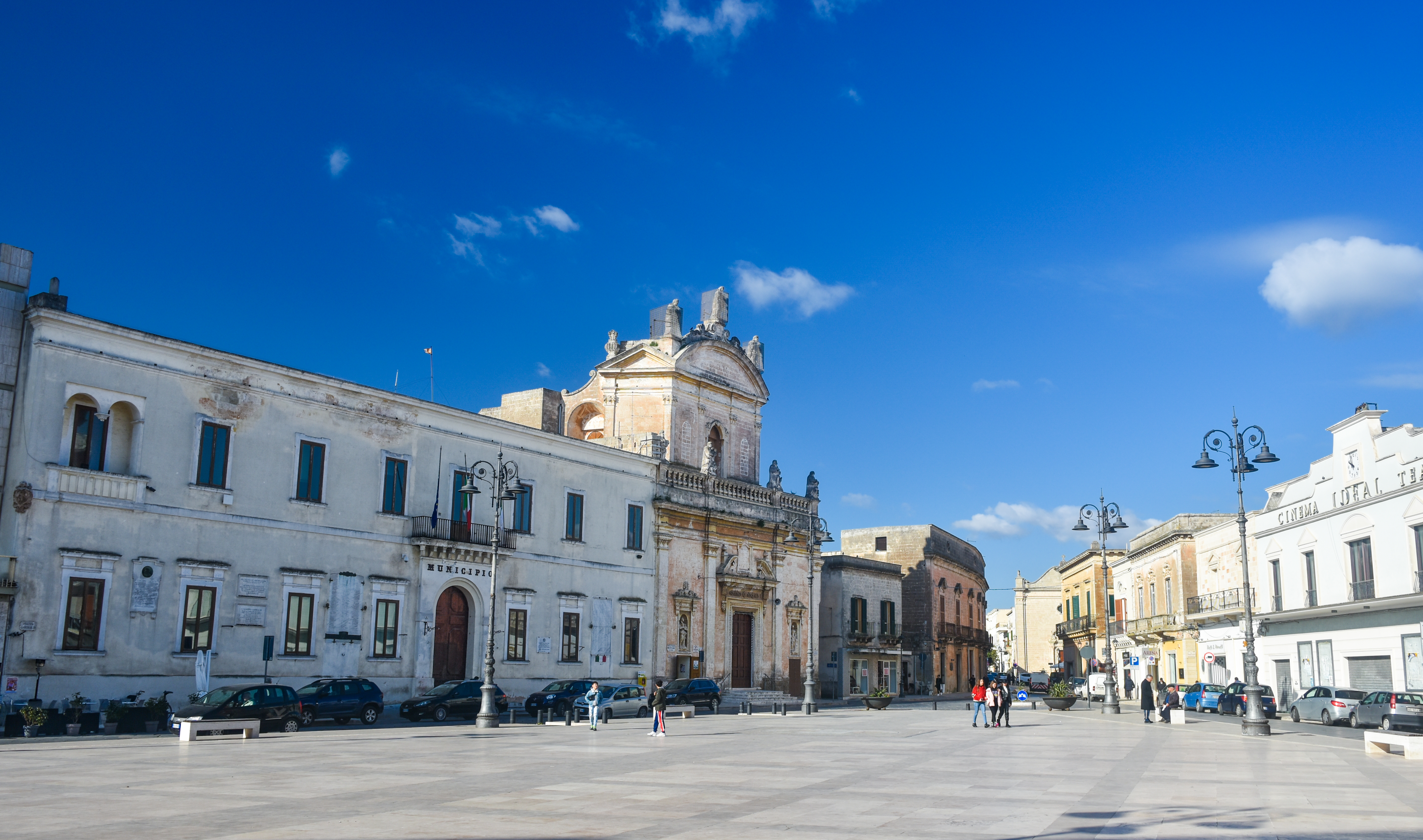
- Garibaldi Square in Manduria

- Flag Coat of arms

- Location within Italy Location within Apulia
- Coordinates: 40°24′N 17°38′E
- Country: Italy
- Region: Apulia
- Province: Taranto (TA)
- Frazioni: Uggiano Montefusco, San Pietro in Bevagna, Torre Colimena

Government
  - Mayor: Commissar

Area
  - Total: 197 km^{2} (76 sq mi)
- Elevation: 79 m (259 ft)

Population (30 September 2017)
  - Total: 31,180
  - Density: 158/km^{2} (410/sq mi)
- Demonym: Manduriani
- Time zone: UTC+1 (CET)
  - Summer (DST): UTC+2 (CEST)
- Postal code: 74024
- Dialing code: 099
- Patron saint: St. Gregory the Great
- Saint day: September 3
- Website: Official website

Manduria is a city and comune of Apulia, Italy, in the province of Taranto. With c. 32,000 inhabitants (2013), it is located 35 kilometres (22 mi) east of Taranto.

== Etymology ==
The name Manduria is thought to derive from a Proto-Indo-European stem *mond-/*mend- or *mando-, meaning 'foal'. The toponym would, then, be of Messapic origin, and related to the semantic field of 'horses', also seen in Illyrian theonym Iuppiter Menzanas and Albanian mëz-i 'foal'.

== History ==
It was an important stronghold of the Messapii against Taras. Archidamus III, king of Sparta, fell beneath its walls in 338 BC, while leading the army of the latter (Manduria is also referred to as "Mandonion" in works by the Greek and Roman historian Plutarch). Manduria revolted to Hannibal, but was taken by the Romans in 209 BC.

Pliny the Elder mentions Manduria in Natural History. He describes a well with a strangely constant water level. No matter how much water was taken out the water level never changed. The well also features an almond tree growing right from the middle of the well shaft. The well may still be seen today.

The town was destroyed by the Saracens in the 10th century. The inhabitants rebuilt on the site of the present town, which they renamed Casalnuovo. In 1700 they took back the ancient name of Manduria.

== Main sights ==
The modern city is close to the site of the ancient Manduria, considerable remains of the defences of which can still be seen; they consisted of a double line of wall built of rectangular blocks of stone, without mortar, and with a broad ditch in front. Ancient tombs with gold ornaments were found in 1886.

The symbol of the city is a well with an almond tree growing from the center, which was mentioned by the Roman author Pliny the Elder in Naturalis Historia, a work published in the 1st century AD. The well (named Fonte Pliniano after Pliny the Elder) can still be seen today exactly as it was described some 2,000 years ago, with the almond tree still rising out of the center. Other sights include:

- Chiesa Madre (or Collegiata) of medieval origin but renovated in the 16th century.
- Church of San Pietro Mandurino, probably a Hellenistic hall tomb adapted as a church in the 8th-9th century. Is opened to visits by the public only during certain celebrations.
- Church of the Holy Trinity (11th/12th centuries). It has a façade with three Renaissance portals and a rose window. The 15th-century bell tower is decorated by large masks of unknown origin.
- Church of SS. Rosario.
- Church of SS. Immacolata.
- Church of Santa Lucia (1540)
- Medieval Jewish Ghetto.
- Castle, which was the seat of the Imperiali princes from 1719.
- Archaeological Park
- Arch of Sant'Angelo, gateway to the historical center

== Primitivo di Manduria DOC ==
The local Primitivo di Manduria DOC wine is made from 100% Primitivo grapes. This wine is also characterized by an unusually high alcohol by volume percentage - around 14%. Wines made from Primitivo have notes of plum and spice, like Zinfandel, but because of different growing soils and climate, the fruit character is less jammy, the structure more akin to old world wines, with rustic notes of earth and spice, as well as tamed fruit flavors.

== Cuisine ==
In addition to Primitivo di Manduria, other typical recognised food of the city are Uva di Puglia PGI, "Terra d'Otranto" extra-virgin olive, an ecotype of carosello and the tomato Pomodorino di Manduria.
