= Phalanthus =

In Greek mythology, Phalanthus (/fəˈlænθəs/; Ancient Greek: Φάλανθος) is the name of three men.

- Phalanthus of Tanagra, one of the defenders of Thebes in the war of the Seven against Thebes. He was killed by Hippomedon.
- Phalanthus of Tarentum, the Spartan founder of Tarentum. Married to Aethra.
- Phalanthus, son of Agelaus (son of Stymphalus, son of Elatus, son of Arcas). A city in Arcadia was named after him.
