= Partheniae =

Group of people in ancient Greece

In ancient Greece, the Partheniae or Parthenians (in Greek οἱ Παρθενίαι / hoi Partheníai, literally “sons of virgins”, i.e. unmarried young girls) were a lower-ranking Spartiate population which, according to tradition, left Laconia to go to Magna Graecia and founded Taras, modern Taranto, in the current region of Apulia, in southern Italy.

== Origins of the Parthenians ==
At least three distinct traditions carry the origins of the Parthenians. The oldest is that of Antiochus of Syracuse (a contemporary of Thucydides quoted by Strabo, VI, 3, 2), according to which the Spartiates, during the first Messenian war (end of the 8th century BC), had rejected like cowards those who had not fought, along with their descendants:

Antiochus says that, during the Messenian war, those Lacedemonians which did not take part with the mission shall be declared as slaves and called Helots; as for the children born during the mission, we shall call them Parthenians and deny them of all legal rights.

The Parthenians were therefore the first tresantes ("trembling"), a category which gathers the cowards and thus excludes themselves from the community of the Homoioi, the Peers. Thereafter, Parthenians plotted against the Peers and, discovered, would have been driven out of Sparta, from which they departed for Italy and founded Taras, whose date is traditionally fixed in 706 BC - which archaeology does not deny.

Strabo (ibid, VI, 3, 3) himself opposes the testimony of Antiochus to that of Ephorus (4th century BC), also quoted by Polybius (XII, 6b, 5), Justin (III, 4, 3) and also Dionysius of Halicarnassus (XIX, 2-4). According to the latter, the Spartiates swore during the Messenian War, not to return home as long as they had not attained victory. The war prolonged and Sparta's demography being threatened, the Spartiates let the young Spartans who had not sworn the oath return home. These were ordered to copulate with all the girls available. The children who were born from these unions were named Parthenians. Their mothers, since they were compelled by the state to procreate, were legally considered unmolested and fit to marry once the war was over.

Lastly, a third tradition, mentioned by Servius and Heraclides, made the Parthenians bastards who had resulted from the unions of Spartan women and their slaves, always during the Messenian war. The same tradition is told to explain the origins of Locri, also in Magna Graecia.

There are variants to these three traditions: for example, Servius, when speaking of the second tradition, made the Parthenians' fathers slaves. Aristotle (Politica , 1306 B 28) seems to follow the first tradition: when the Parthenians' plot was discovered, they were sent to found Taras. He specifies that the Parthenians "are the offspring of the Peers" (ἐκ τῶν ὁμοίων) but the meaning of the expression is unclear. It seems however that for Aristotle, the Parthenians were politically inferior, without explaining exactly why. The reason for the plot itself remains unclear. P. Cartledge suggests that the Messenian lands could have been unfairly divided, which would have been the cause of the Parthenians' dissatisfaction. Lastly, Justin and Diodorus of Sicily (VIII, 21) indicate that the events took place during the Second Messenian War of Messenia (second half of the 8th century BC), and not the first.

== The foundation of Taras ==
Many authors give the impression that the Parthenians were driven out and not sent with a specific aim of Greek colonisation. Aristotle states for his part that the Parthenians “are sent to found Taras”, conforming with the Greek tradition advised by Plato ( Lois , 735 F), which consists, in the event of political disturbance, to send the seditious ones to found a colony far away from the metropolis. However, the presence of Parthenians in Sparta also causes a disorder, either because of a plot, or even just because of their existence, disturbing the social population. We know that the founders of Taras brought with them the worship of Apollo Hyakinthos, traditionally celebrated in Amycles: a certain Amyclean "nationalism" would have to exist among Parthenians. P. Cartledge supports that the foundation of Taras was not approved by Sparta, "only through posteriori".

Also according to tradition, the oikist (“founder of the city”) Phalanthus who led the Parthenians, took council from the oracle of Delphos; this is traditional in the movement of colonisations. According to certain versions of the tradition, the oracle had in fact advised the locality of Satyrion, located 12 km further away. The discovery of ceramics from the late Geometric period in Satyrion tends to support the thesis of a temporary settlement in these places before finally founding Taras, which occupies a unique position: it offers a well protected port and good ground communications. The Iapyges, an indigenous population, were driven out, probably before 700 BC if we base ourselves on the discovery of pottery from the late Geometrical period of Laconia on the old acropolis of the city. Thereafter, the links between Sparta and Taras remain very close. Taras would remain the only Lacedemonian colony, undoubtedly because the conquest of Messenia rendered the search for new grounds redundant.

In a recent (G.Bonivento Pupino) scientific narration about the Spartan colonization of Taras in 706 B.C., all the historical sources are analysed in order to answer an important question concerning the settlement of Partheniai which established the Greek colony of Taras (today Taranto): who were the so-called Parteni/Partheniai forced to flee their mother country and conquer Satyrion on Ionian sea? Were they sons of amoral women, defamed by some ancient source because they have been forced to join together with several young men, in order to reinforce the birth-rate at Sparta? Or rather were the Parthenìai sons of noble Spartan girls or of war widows, both deprived of lawful marriage (gamos) when children were born without rights, during the Messenian war? When warriors returned home, Parthenìai have been bereft of all hopes to obtain a lot of land (kleros) conquered in Messenia by Spartiates and must accept to emigrate to Apulia in order to defeat Messapians and take possession of the fertile land of Satyrion, above which was built Taras. The purpose of the narration titled "We Tarentine people sons of Partheni" is to put the word "end" to the negative opinion about the Tarantine Spartan ancestresses, due to some filo-Attic sources (particularly Erodoto) written for a bad propaganda against Taras, colony of Sparta and enemy of Athens. The scientific essay was published in the Revue Ribalta of Puglia in order to be spread in the high schools and among the Tarentin citizens; it became so popular that today it is told by scholars, teachers and touristic guides when they want to give account of the foundation of Taras in Magna Graecia.
