= Ceglie Messapica =

Ceglie Messapica Cégghie (Neapolitan)
- Comune
- Comune di Ceglie Messapica
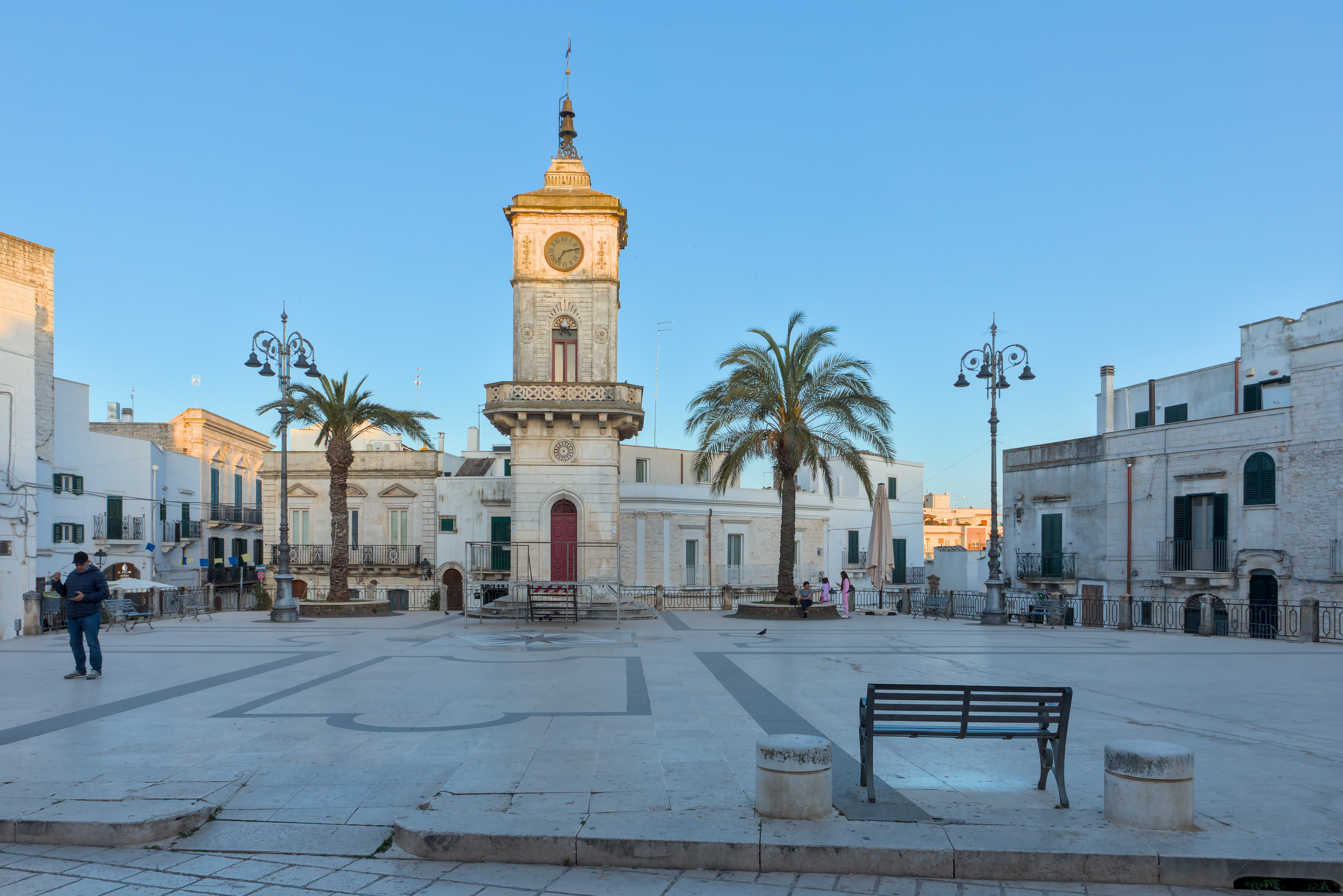
- Piazza Plebiscito at sunset

- Location within Italy Location within Apulia
- Coordinates: 40°39′N 17°30′E
- Country: Italy
- Region: Apulia
- Province: Brindisi (BR)

Government
  - Mayor: Luigi Caroli (since April 11, 2010)

Area
  - Total: 132.02 km^{2} (50.97 sq mi)
- Elevation: 298 m (978 ft)

Population (30 June 2017)
  - Total: 19,914
  - Density: 150.84/km^{2} (390.68/sq mi)
- Demonym: Cegliesi
- Time zone: UTC+1 (CET)
  - Summer (DST): UTC+2 (CEST)
- Postal code: 72013
- Dialing code: 0831
- Patron saint: Anthony of Padua, St. Anne and St. Roch
- Saint day: 13 June, 26 July and 16 August
- Website: Official website

Ceglie Messapica (Italian pronunciation: [ˈtʃɛʎʎe mesˈsaːpika]; Brindisino: Cégghie) is a town, and comune, located in the province of Brindisi and region of Apulia, in southern Italy, in the traditional area called Salento.

== Geography ==
The area of Ceglie Messapica is located between the Murge and the Upper Salento: its typical elements include trulli, farms, lamie (typical southern single room square dwellings), rupestrian churches, Carsic caves, dolinas, specchie and paretoni (remains of city walls), dry-stone walls, olive groves, vineyards, maquis shrub, ancient oak trees, cattle pastures and arable land.

== History ==
According to legend, it was founded by the Pelasgi, to whom belonged the megalithic structures known as specchie. After the arrival of Greek colonists around 700 BC, it received the name of Kailìa (Ancient Greek: Καιλία; Latin: Caelia). Nearby the village were extra-urban sanctuaries dedicated to the God Apollo (near the modern church of San Rocco) and Venus (on the Montevicoli hill).

The city was the military capital of the Messapi (the civil capital being located in the nearby Oria), and fought against the Greek city Taranto in the latter's attempt to gain a passage to the Adriatic Sea. The Messapic Ceglie had some 40,000 inhabitants. In Roman times it was already decaying, and in the Middle Ages was a small village known as Celie de Galdo, with a little castle. After several minor families, in 1584 its fief was given to the Sanseverino family, who enlarged the castle and founded two convents for the Capuchines (now disappeared) and for the Dominicans.

== Main sights ==
Numerous archaeological remains of the ancient Messapi civilization were found in Ceglie's area. It had four lines of walls, the inner one having a perimeter of 5 kilometres (3 mi). The external one had high fortifications known as specchie, which could be up to 20 metres (66 ft) and 60 metres (200 ft) in diameter.

== Transport ==
The Ceglie Messapica railway station is located on the Martina Franca-Lecce railway, which connects to the railway junction at Francavilla Fontana station. The train services and the railway infrastructure are operated by Ferrovie del Sud Est, a subsidiary of the Ferrovie dello Stato Italiane.

The SP581 provincial road connects the commune with Martina Franca to the west and San Vito dei Normanni to the east.

== Events ==
- The Procession and Feast of Saint Anthony of Padua, on 13 June.
- The Procession and Feast of Saint Roch, on 17 August.
- Ceglie Food Festival, dedicated to gastronomy, on August
- Coppa Messapica, cycling race in the Itria valley

== Gallery ==
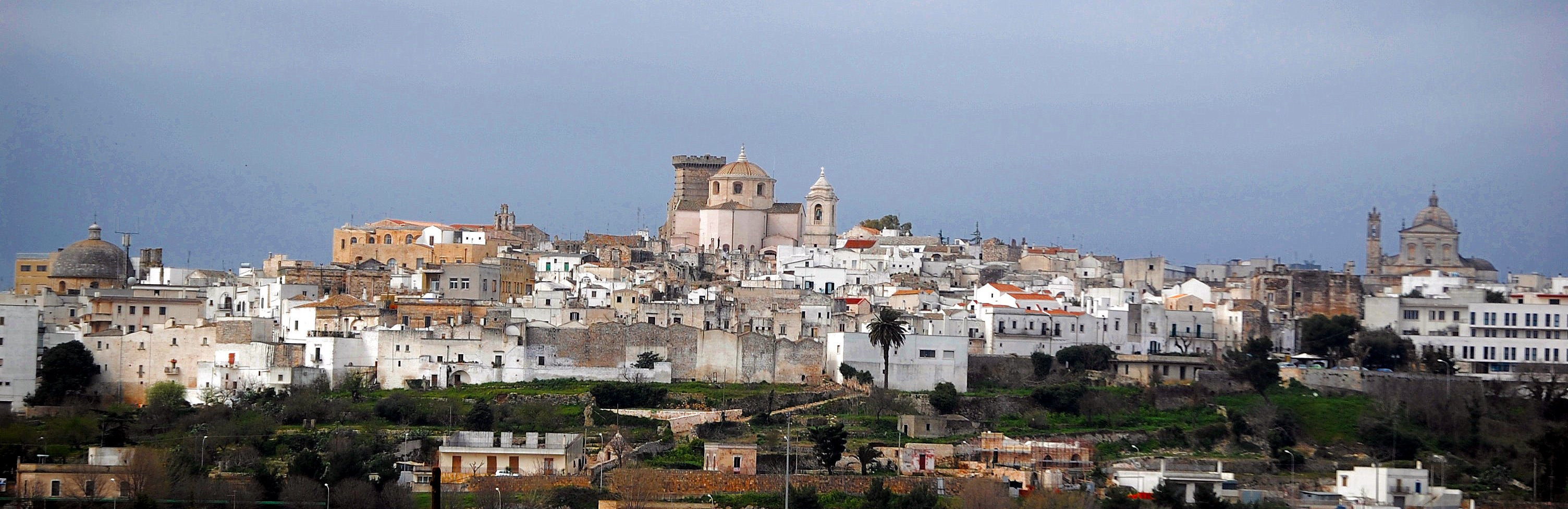
Panoramic view

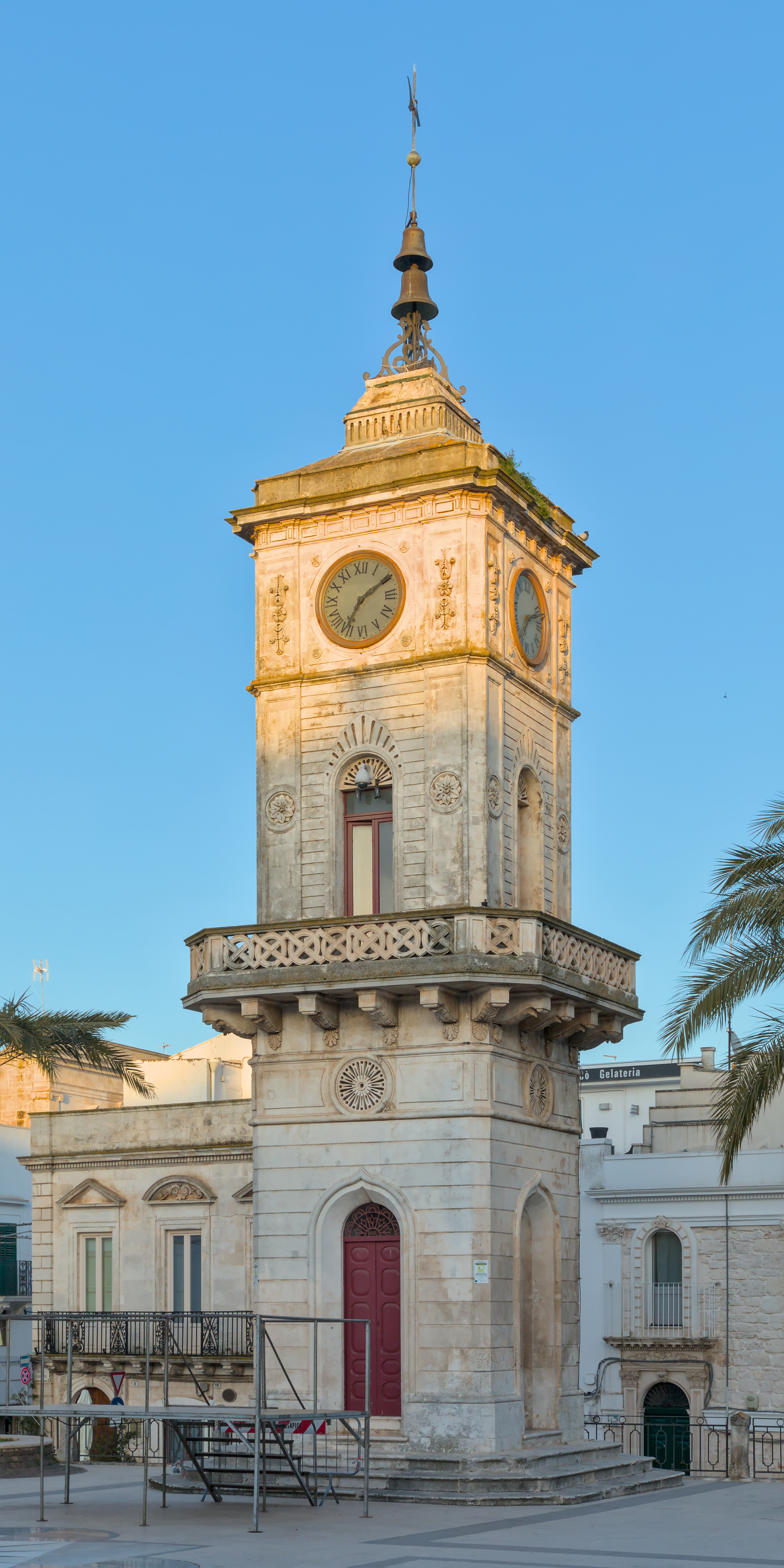
Torre dell'Orologio

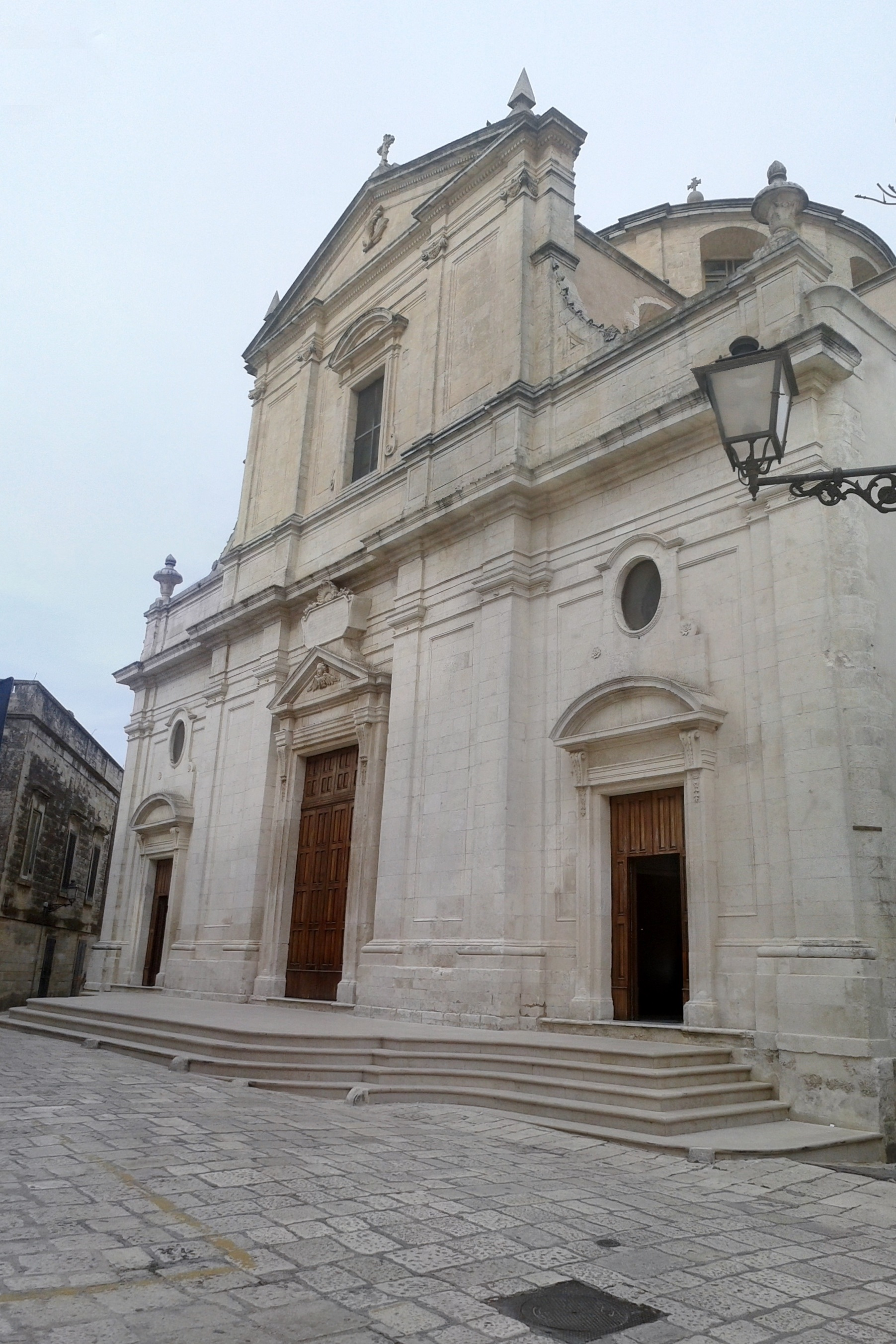
Collegiate church

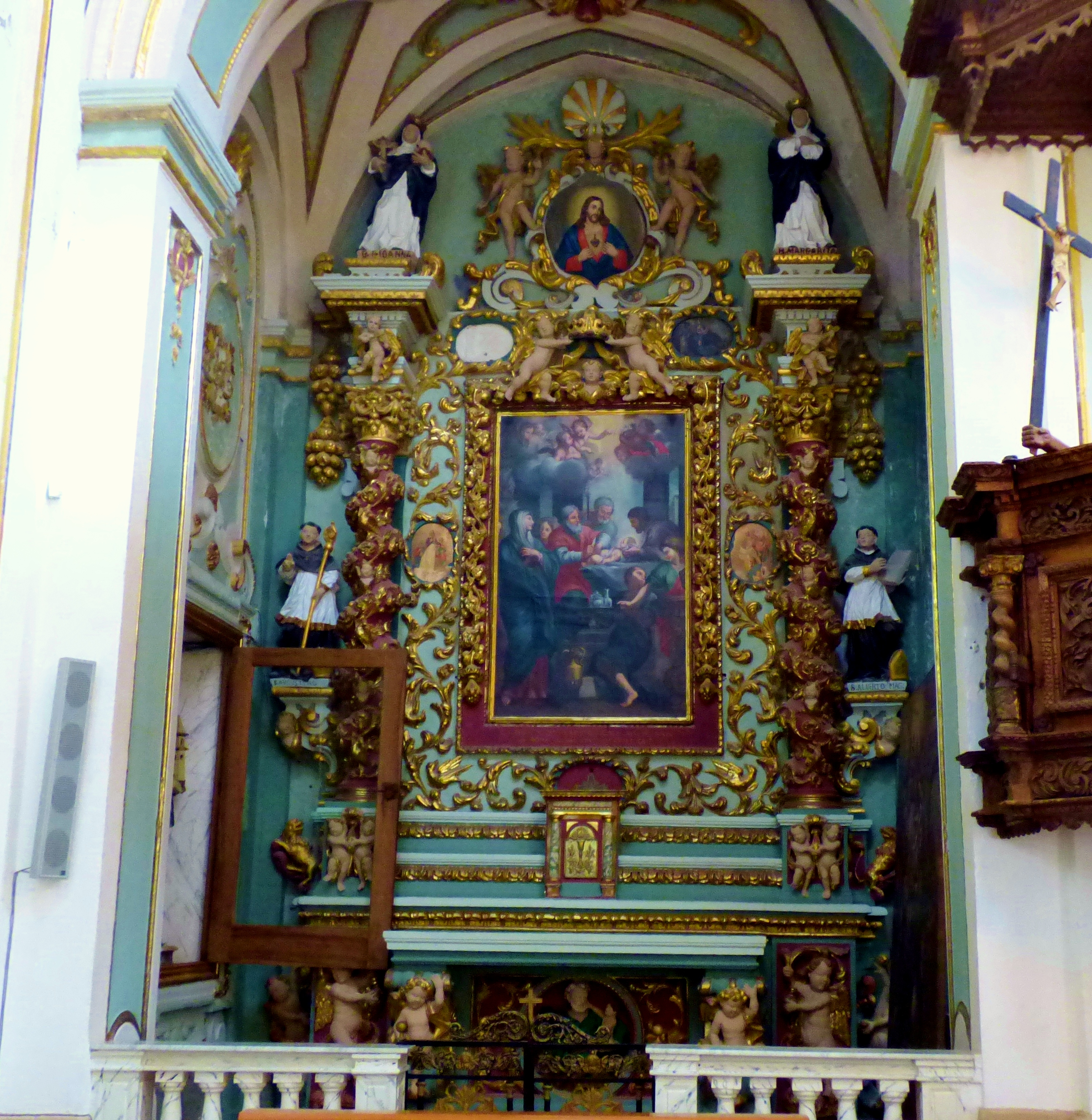
Baroque altar in the church of Saint Domenico

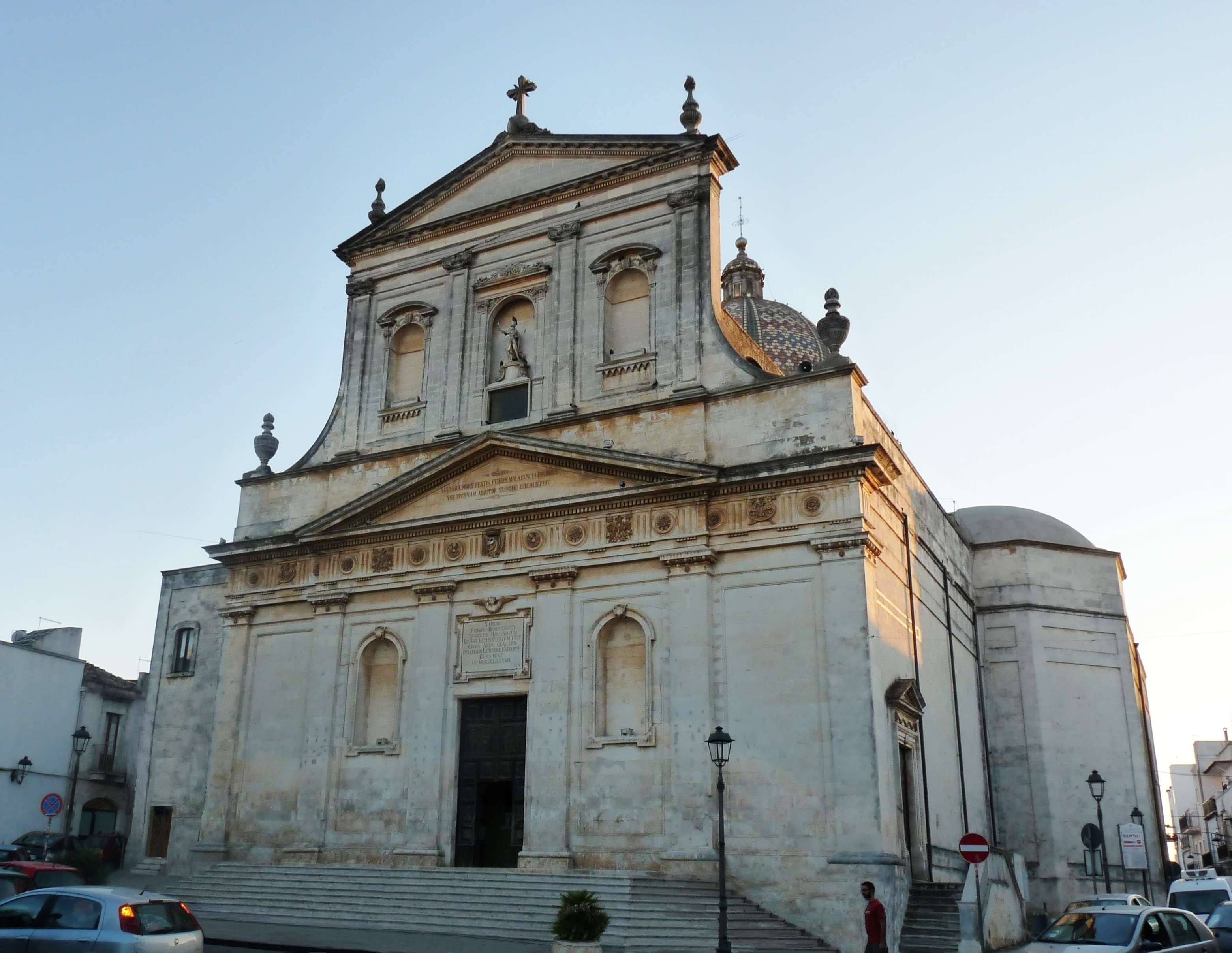
Church of Saint Roch

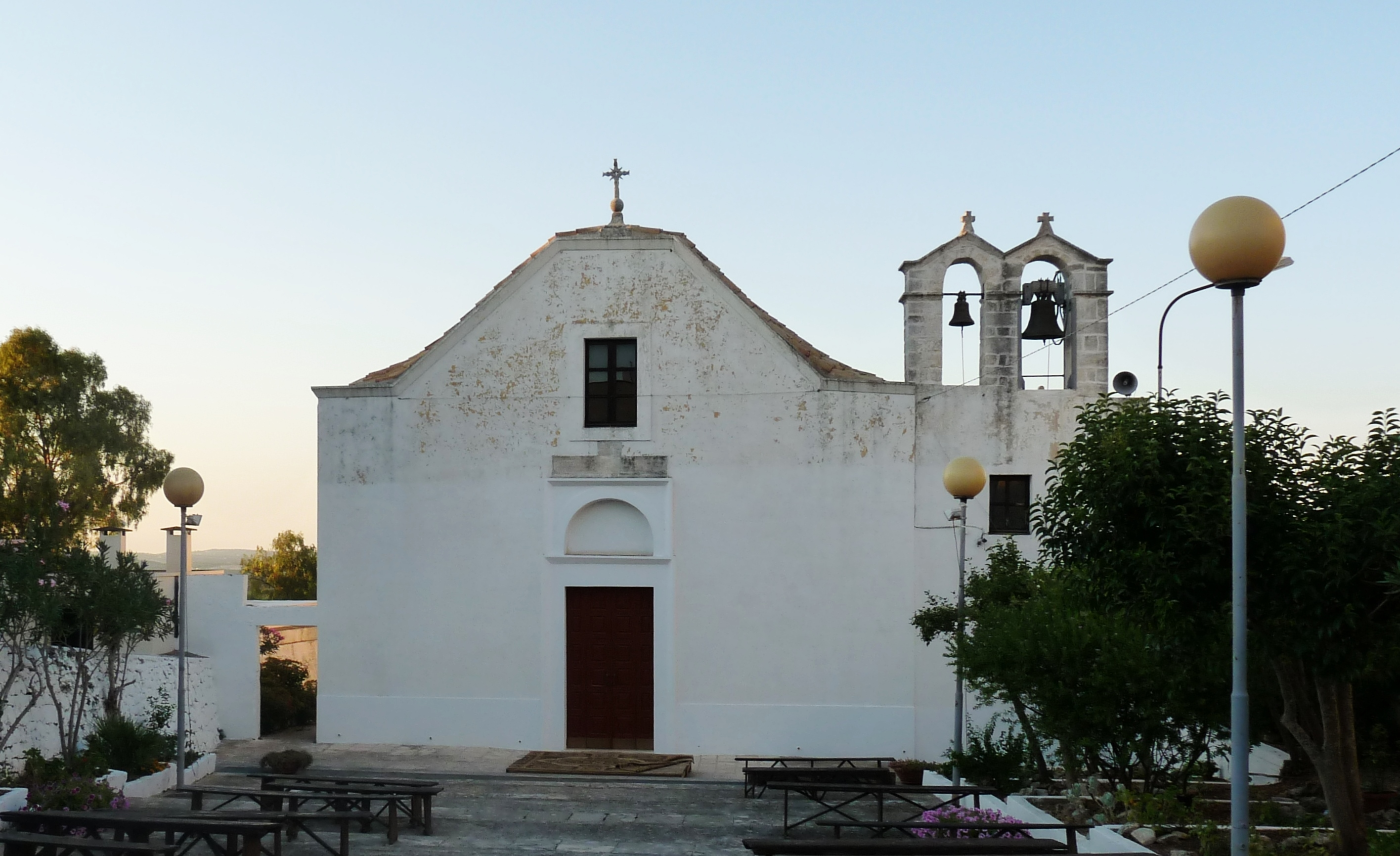
Abbey of Saint Anna

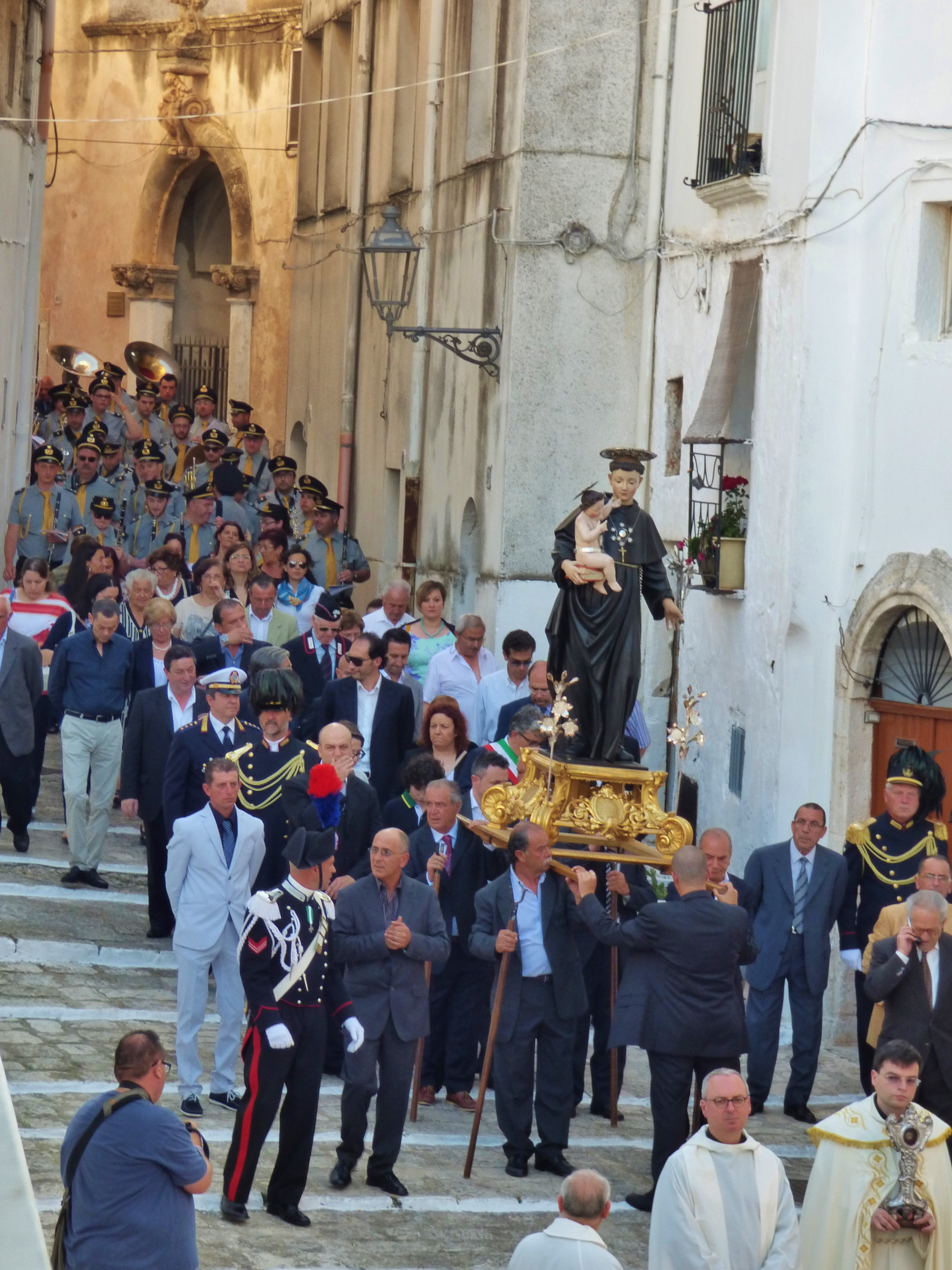
Procession of Saint Anthony

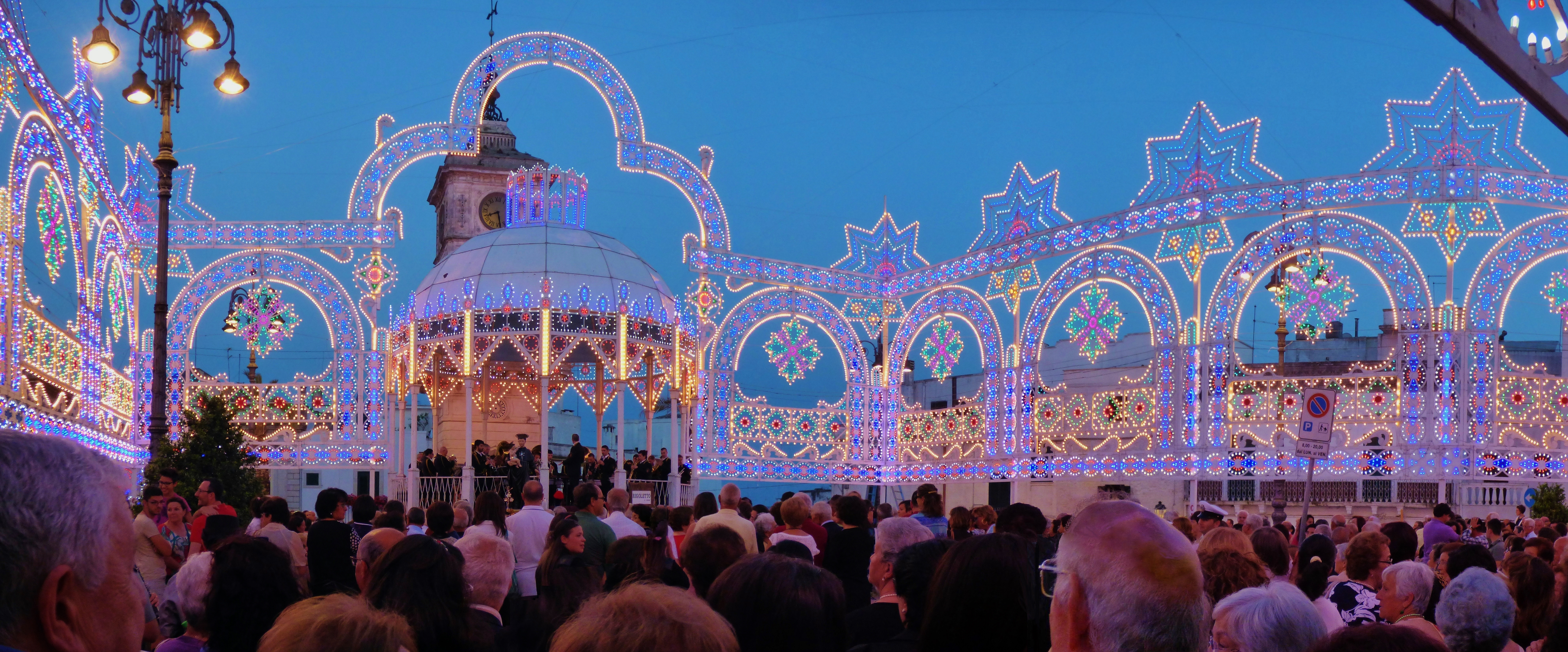
Patronal feast with illuminations

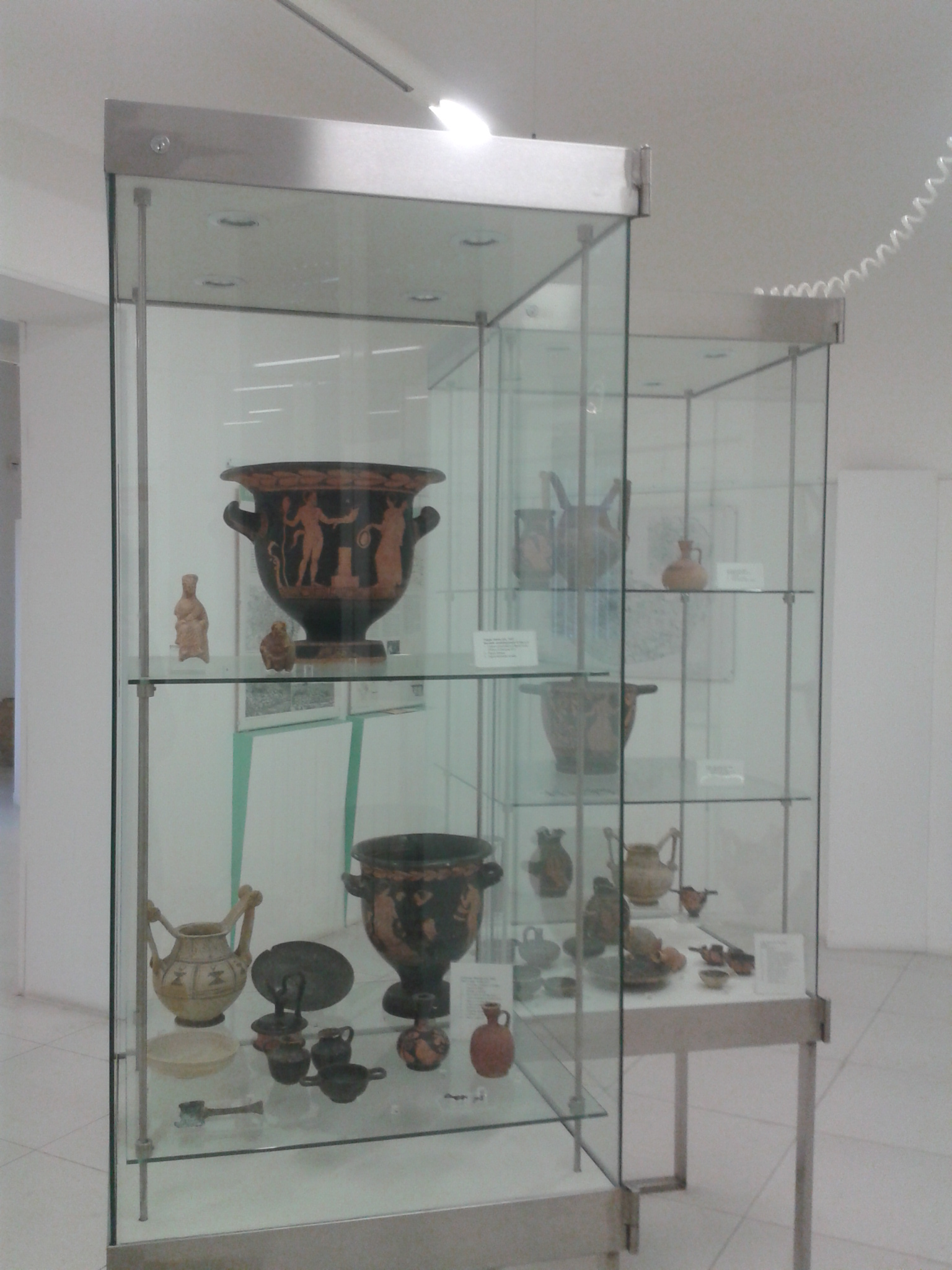
Messapian archaeological finds found in Ceglie

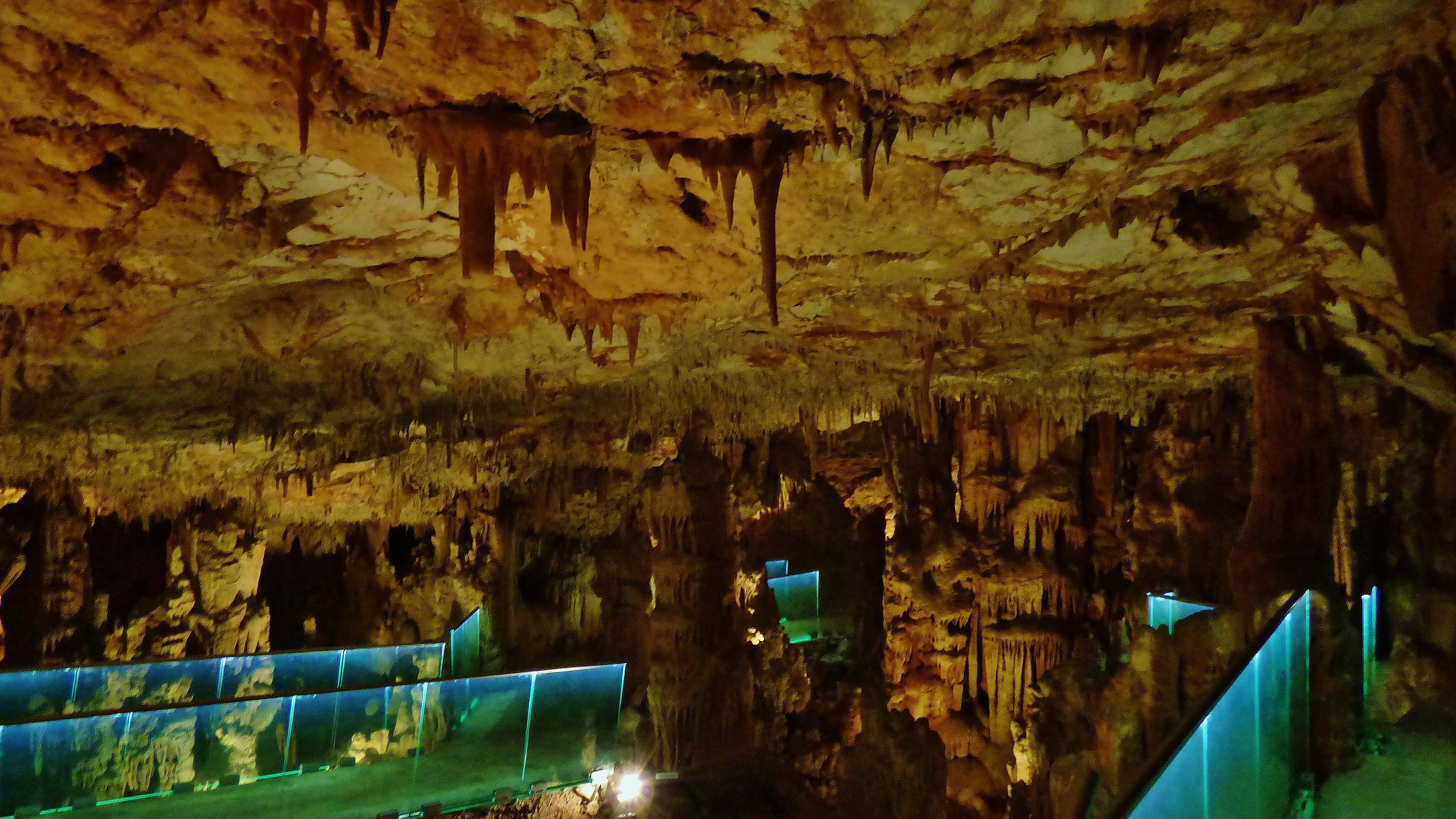
Montevicoli caves

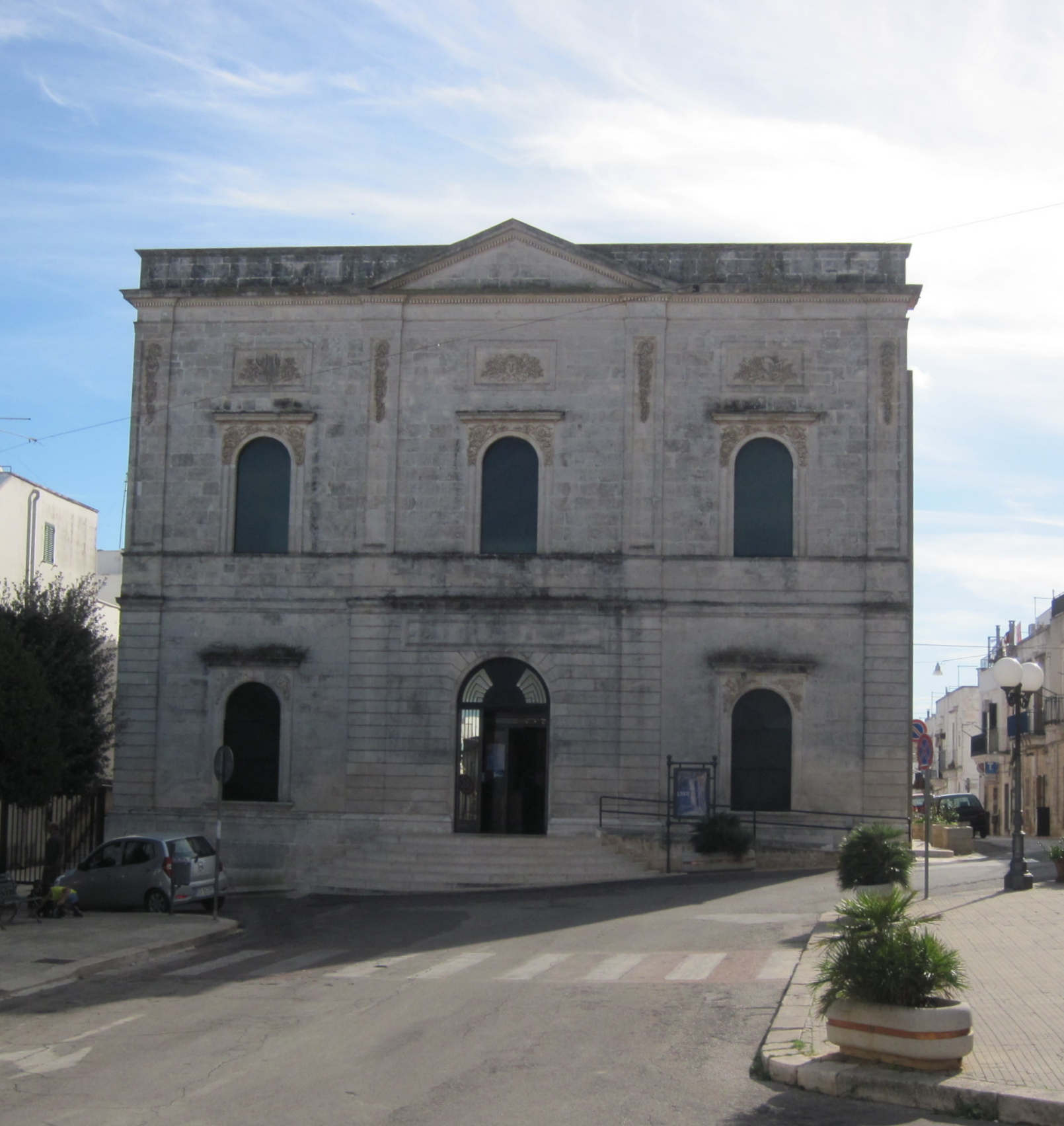
municipal theater

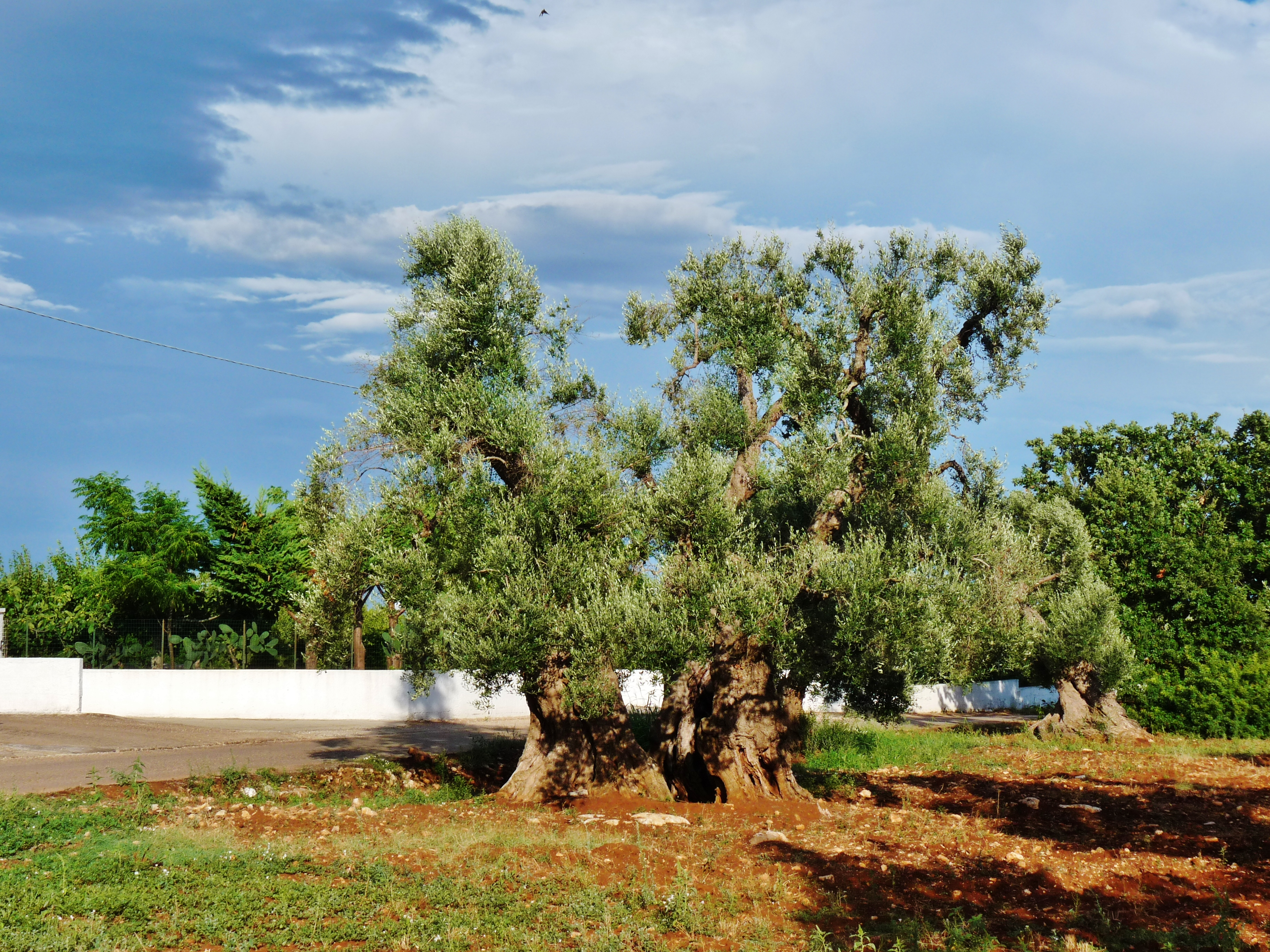
centuries-old olive tree in the countryside

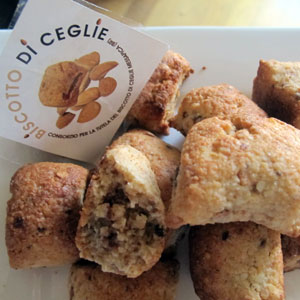
"Biscotto cegliese", typical almond paste biscuits, Slow Food presidium
