= Messapians =

Iapygian tribe

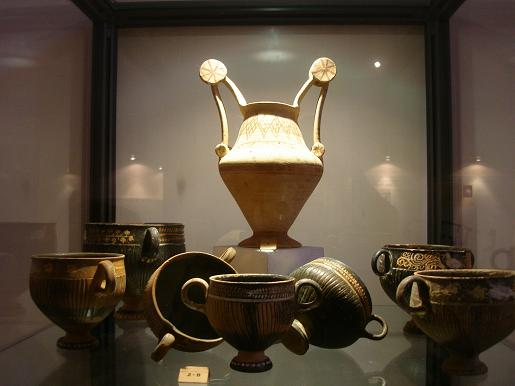
Messapian ceramics in Archaeological Museum of Oria.

The Messapians were an Iapygian tribe who inhabited Salento, a region in what is now southern Italy, in classical antiquity. Two other Iapygian tribes, the Peucetians and the Daunians, inhabited central and northern Apulia respectively. All three tribes spoke the Messapian language, but had developed separate archaeological cultures by the seventh century BC. The Messapians lived in the Messapia region, which extended from Leuca in the southeast to Kailia and Egnatia in the northwest, covering most of the Salento peninsula. This region includes the Province of Lecce and parts of the provinces of Brindisi and Taranto today.

Starting in the third century BC, Greek and Roman writers distinguished the indigenous population of the Salento peninsula differently. According to Strabo, the names Iapygians, Daunians, Peucetians and Messapians were exclusively Greek and not used by the natives, who divided the Salento in two parts. The southern and Ionian part of the peninsula was the territory of the Salentinoi, ranging from Otranto to Leuca and from Leuca to Manduria. The northern part on the Adriatic belonged to the Kalabroi and extended from Otranto to Egnatia with its hinterland.

After the conquest of the Salento by the Roman Republic in 266 BC the distinction between the Iapygian tribes blurred as they were assimilated into ancient Roman society. Strabo makes it clear that in his time, the end of the first century BC, most people used the names Messapia, Iapygia, Calabria and Salentina interchangeably for the Salento. The name Calabria for the entire peninsula was made official when the Roman emperor Augustus divided Italy in regions and gave the whole region of Apulia the name Regio II Apulia et Calabria. Archaeology still follows the original Greek tripartite division of tribes based on the archaeological evidence.

== Name ==
The names Messapii (Ancient Greek: Μεσσάπιοι) and Messapia are usually interpreted as "(the place) Amid waters", Mess- from Proto-Indo-European *medhyo-, "middle" (cf. Albanian mes- and Ancient Greek μέσος méssos "middle"), and -apia from Proto-Indo-European *ap-, "water" (cf. another toponym, Salapia, "salt water"). As Strabo writes, this is the name (exonym) which the Tarentine Greeks used to refer collectively to the Iapygian communities which referred to themselves as Calabri (Ancient Greek: Καλαβροί) and Salentini (Ancient Greek: Σαλεντίνοι) (endonyms) and to their land as Iapygia. The exonym Messapia in Italy corresponds to other toponyms in areas of ancient Greece (e.g. Messapio).

The Messapic tribal name Kalabroi/Calabri has been connected to the Dardanian Galabroi/Galabri in the Balkans.

== History ==
=== Emergence ===
Trans-Adriatic migrations from the Western Balkans to Italy, confirmed by recent archaeological evidence dating to the period between 1700 BCE and 1400 BCE, in the post-Cetina horizon.

Recent archaeological evidence dating to the period between 1700 BCE and 1400 BCE in the post-Cetina horizon confirms trans-Adriatic migrations from the Western Balkans to southeastern Italy, which brought a Western Paleo-Balkan language to Apulia. However, the way in which Proto-Messapic speakers spread in Apulia and which pre-Indo-European languages that had existed in the region were thereby assimilated or displaced is still unknown. Developing their own identity, the Messapians emerged as a sub-tribe distinct from the rest of the Iapygians (Messapic-speakers) in the Iron Age.

The pre-Italic settlement of Gnatia was founded in the fifteenth century BC during the Bronze Age. It was captured and settled by the Iapyges, as they occupied large tracts of territory in Apulia. Rudiae was first settled from the late ninth or early eighth centuries BC. In the late sixth century BC, it developed into a much more important settlement. It flourished under the Messapii, but after their defeat by Rome it dwindled and became a small village. The nearby Lupiae (Lecce) flourished at its expense. The Messapi did not have a centralised form of government. Their towns were independent city-states. They had trade relationships with the Greek cities of Magna Graecia.

=== Conflict with Taras ===
In 473 BC, the Greek city of Tarentum (which was on the border with Messapia) and its ally, Rhegion, tried to seize some of the towns of the Messapii and Peucetii. However, the Iapyge tribes defeated them thanks to the superiority of their cavalry. The war against Tarentum continued until 467 BC.

During the Second Peloponnesian War between Athens and Sparta, the Mesapii were allies of Athens. They provided archers for Athens' massive expeditionary force sent to attack Syracuse in Sicily (415–13 BC). The expedition was a disaster and the entire force was destroyed.

In 356 BC, an alliance between Messapii and Lucani led to the conquest of Heraclea and Matapontus. In 342 BC, Tarentum called for the aid of Archidamus III of Sparta. Archidamus died in battle under the walls of the Messapian city of Manduria in 338 BC.

In 333 BC, Tarentum called Alexander I of Epirus to help them in their war with their Lucani. Alexander defeated the Messapii. He died in a battle against the Lucani in 330 BC.

After the campaign of Alexander I, the Messapii switched allegiance. They allied with Tarentum and Cleonymus of Sparta, who campaigned in the region in 303–02 BC to help Tarentum against, again, the Lucani.

=== Conquest by the Roman Republic ===
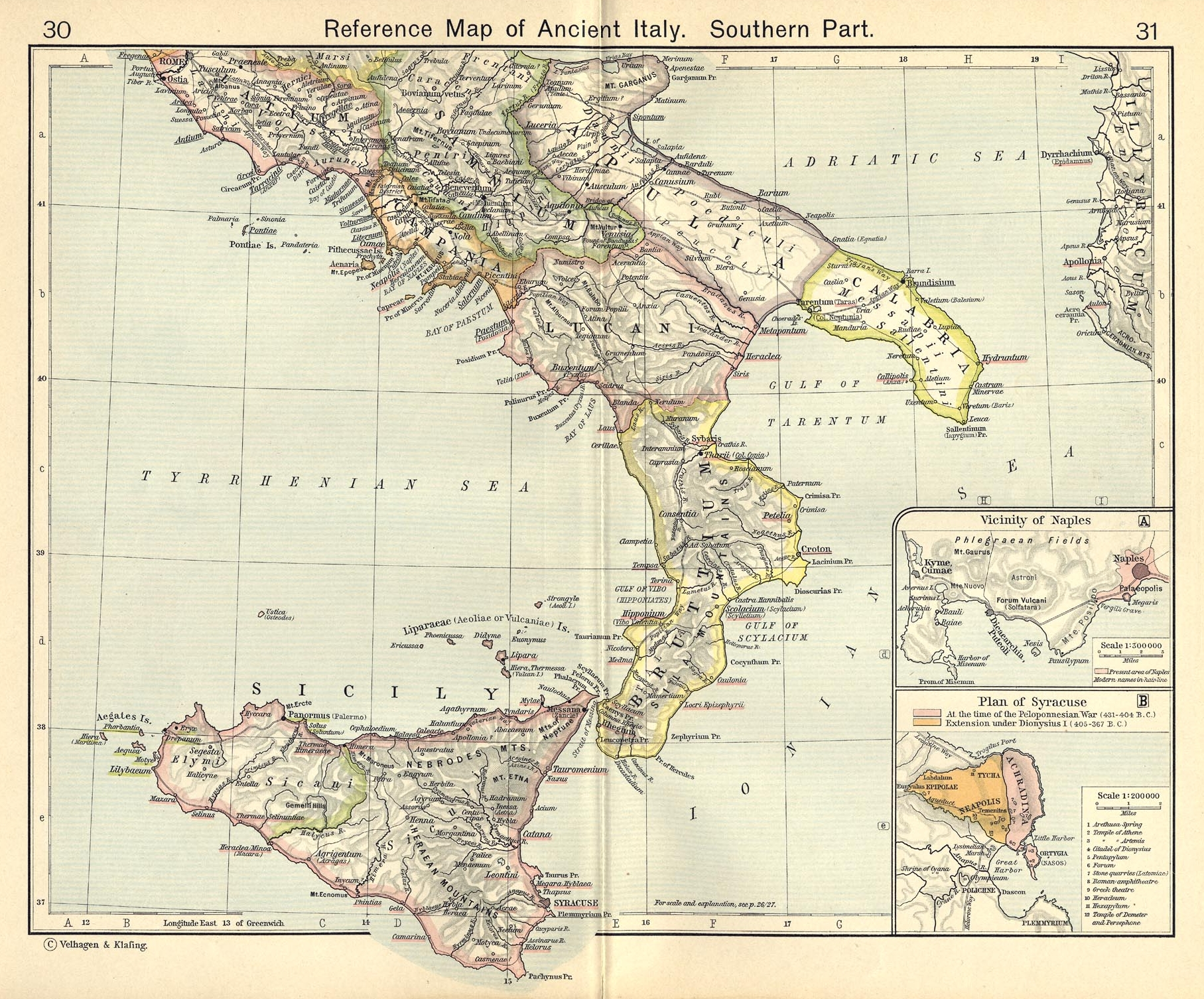
Map of Ancient Italy, Southern Part by William R. Shepherd, 1911.

During the Second Samnite War (327–304 BC) between Rome and the Samnites, the Messapii, Iapyges and Peucetii sided with the Samnites. Some of the cities of the Dauni sided with Rome and some of them sided with the Samnites. The city of Canusium went over to the Romans in 318 BC. Silvium, a Peucetii frontier town, was under Samnite control, but it was captured by Rome in 306 BC.

During the Pyrrhic Wars (280–275 BC), the Messapii sided with Tarentum and Pyrrhus the king of Epirus, in Greece, who landed at Tarentum, ostensibly to help this city in her conflict with the Romans. According to ancient historians, his aim was to conquer Italy. Pyrrhus fought battles against the Romans and a campaign in Sicily. He had to give up the latter and was defeated by the Romans and left Italy. The Messapii were mentioned by Dionysius of Halicarnassus as fighting for Pyrrhus in the Battle of Asculum.

In 272 BC, the Romans captured Tarentum. In 267 BC, Rome conquered the Messapii and Brundisium. This city became Rome's port for sailing to the eastern Mediterranean. Subsequently, the Messapii were rarely mentioned in the historical record. They became Romanised.

During Hannibal's invasion of Italy in the Second Punic War (218–201 BC), the Messapii remained loyal to the Romans. The Battle of Cannae, where Hannibal routed the forces of the Romans and their Italic allies, was fought in the heart of the neighbouring Peucetii territory. The Roman survivors were welcomed into nearby Canusium. Part of the final stages of the war were fought out at Monte Gargano, in the northernmost part of Apulia, in the territory of the Dauni.

== Language and writing ==
The Messapian language is generally considered similar to the Illyrian languages, although this has been debated as a mostly speculative grouping, as Illyrian languages are themselves poorly attested. Albanian dialects are still a relatable group with Messapian, due to toponyms in Apulia, some of towns that have no etymological forms outside Albanian linguistic sources. However, Messapic is to be considered as an independent Indo-European language.

The language became extinct following the Roman conquest of the region, which began during the late 4th century BC. It has been preserved in about 300 inscriptions written in the Greek alphabet and dating from the 6th to the 1st century BC.

== Geography ==
Messapia was relatively urbanized and more densely populated compared to the rest of Iapygia. It possessed 26–28 walled settlements, while the remainder of Iapygia had 30–35 more dispersed walled settlements. The Messapian population has been estimated at 120,000 to 145,000 people before the Roman conquest. The main Messapic cities included:

- Alytia (Alezio)
- Brundisium/Brentesion (Brindisi)
- Cavallino
- Hodrum/Idruntum (Otranto)
- Hyria/Orria (Oria)
- Kaìlia (Ceglie Messapica)
- Manduria
- Mesania (Mesagne)
- Neriton (Nardò)
- Rudiae (outside Lecce)
- Mios/Myron (Muro Leccese)
- Thuria Sallentina (Roca Vecchia)
- Uzentum (Ugento)

Other Messapic settlements have been discovered near Francavilla Fontana, San Vito dei Normanni and in Vaste (Poggiardo).

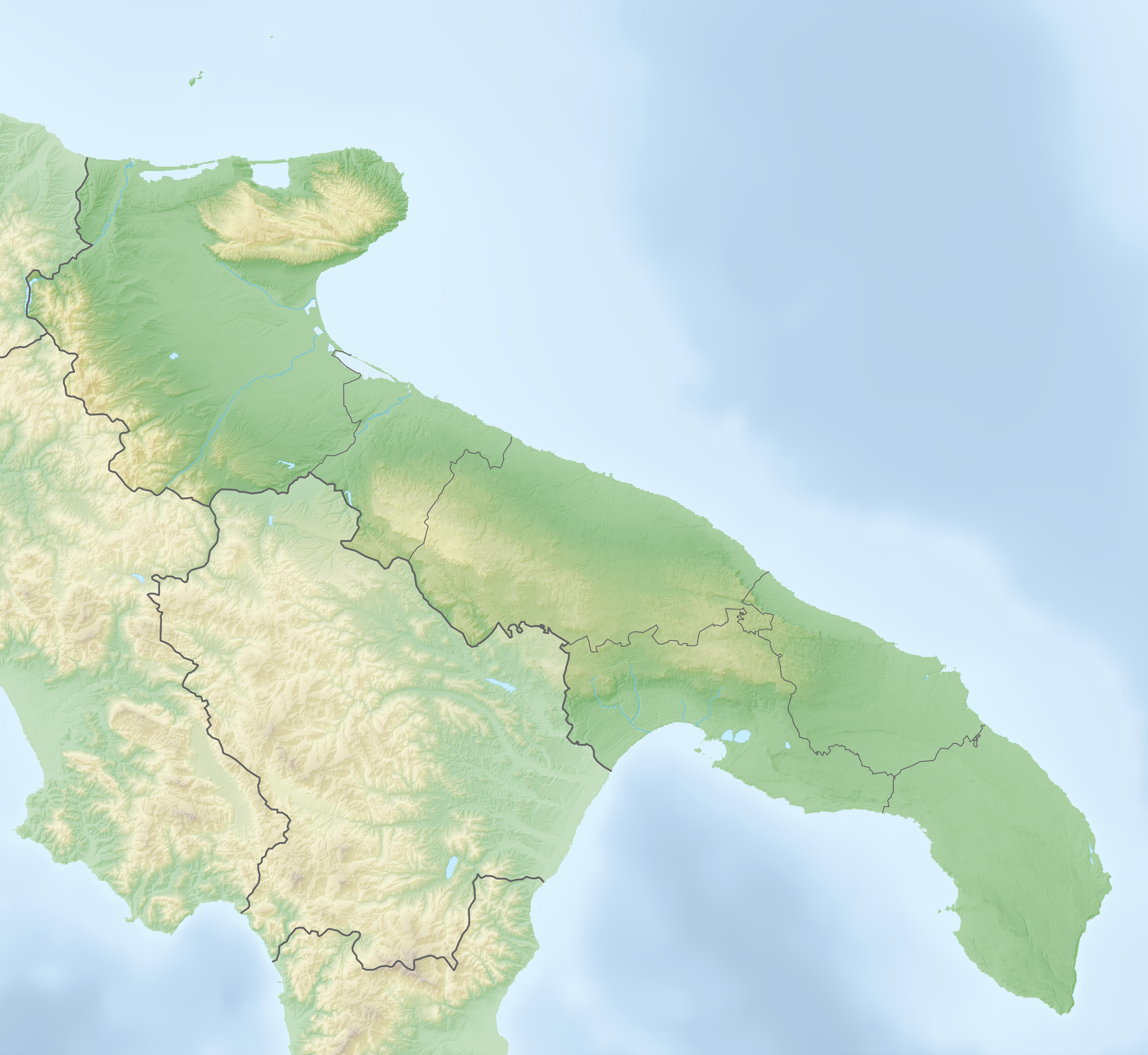
Main Messapic settlements and sites with Messapic inscriptions.

#	Settlement	Information	Geographic coordinates	Ref.
1	Ceglie		40°39′00″N 17°30′00″E	
2	Gnatia		40°53′16″N 17°23′28″E	
3	Rudiae		40°20′2.4″N 18°8′49.2″E	
4	Salapia		40°53′16″N 17°23′28″E	
5	Valetium		40°20′2.4″N 18°8′49.2″E	
6	Canosa		41°13′00″N 16°04′00″E	
7	Rutigliano		40°56′00″N 16°54′00″E	
8	Oria		40°30′00″N 17°38′00″E	
9	Manduria		40°24′00″N 17°38′00″E	
10	Lecce		40°21′00″N 18°10′00″E	
11	Alezio		40°04′00″N 18°03′00″E	
12	Ugento		39°55′38″N 18°09′41″E	
13	Vaste		40°03′1.58″N 18°23′23.823″E	

== See also ==
- Ancient Italic peoples
- Messapian pottery
- Messapian shepherds
- Opis of Messapia
