= Taras =

Taras may refer to:

== Geography ==
- Taras (ancient city) of Magna Graecia, modern-day Taranto
- Taras, Iran, a village in Tehran province
- Taras, Łódź Voivodeship, Poland
- Taraš, a village in Vojvodina, Serbia
- Taras, Kazakhstan, a village in Almaty Region

== People ==
- Taras (name), a Ukrainian male given name
- Taras (surname)

== Other uses ==
- Taras (mythology), in Greek mythology the son of Poseidon and the nymph Satyrion

== See also ==
- Taraz, a city in Jambyl Region, Kazakhstan
