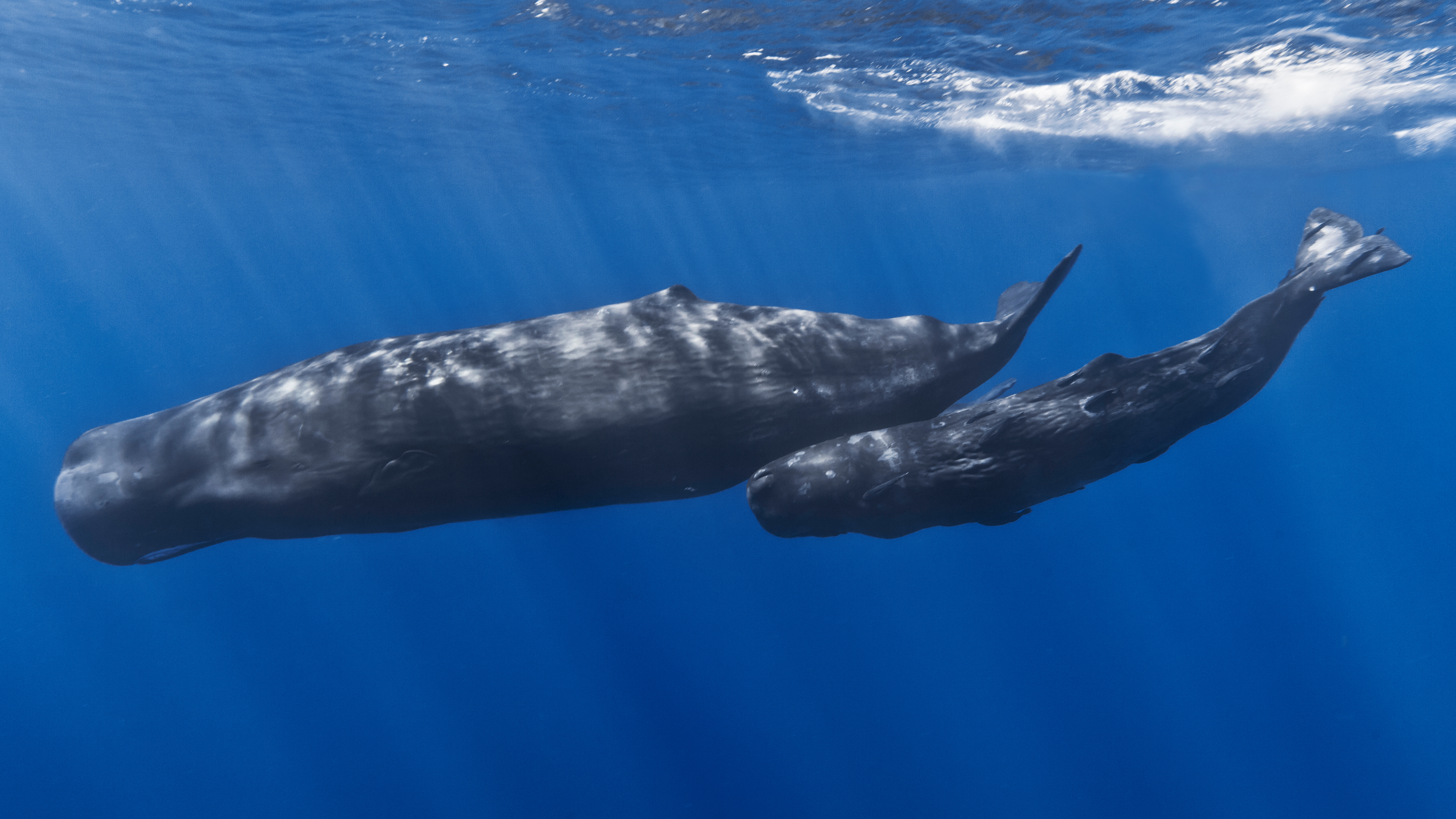
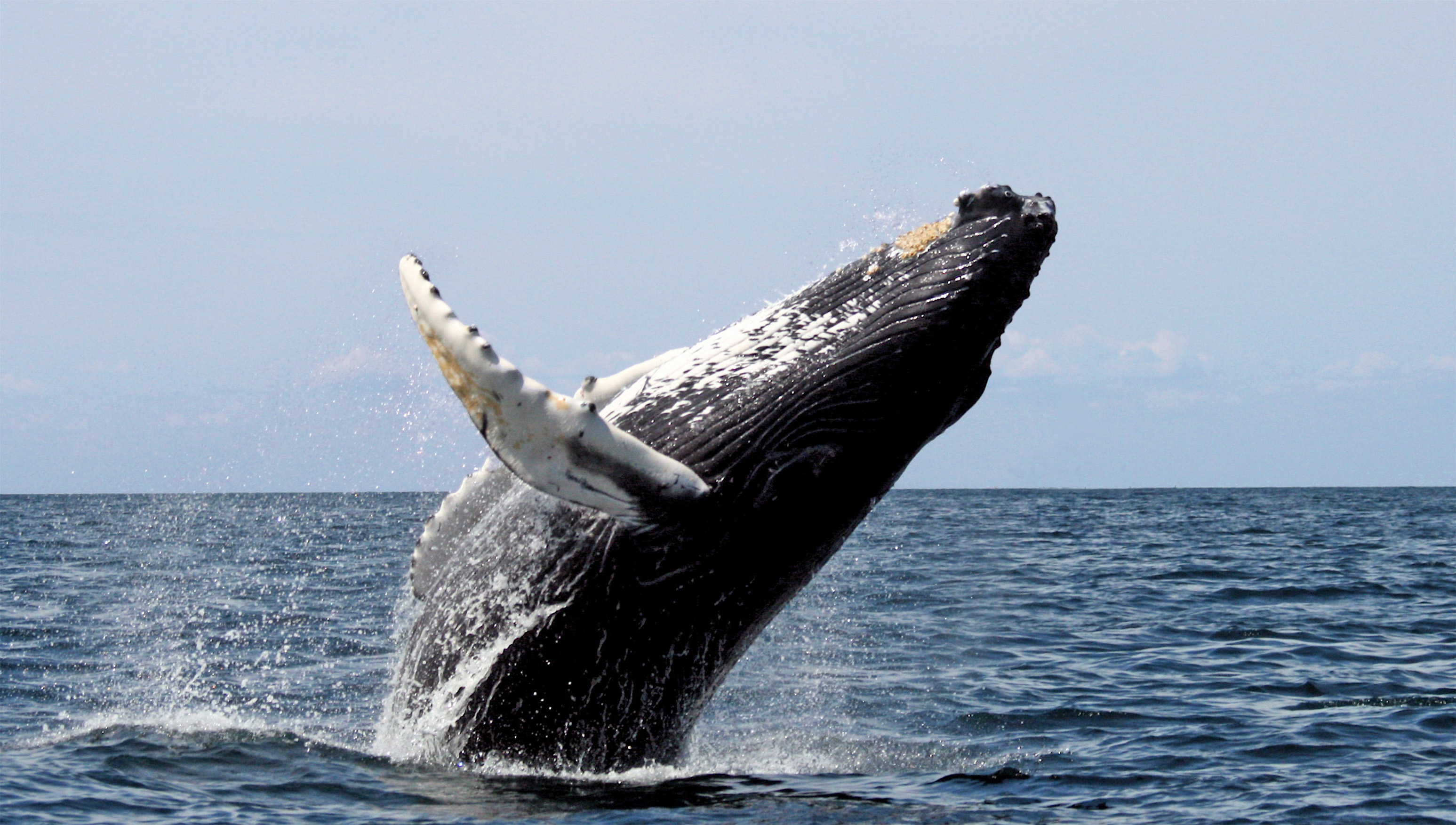
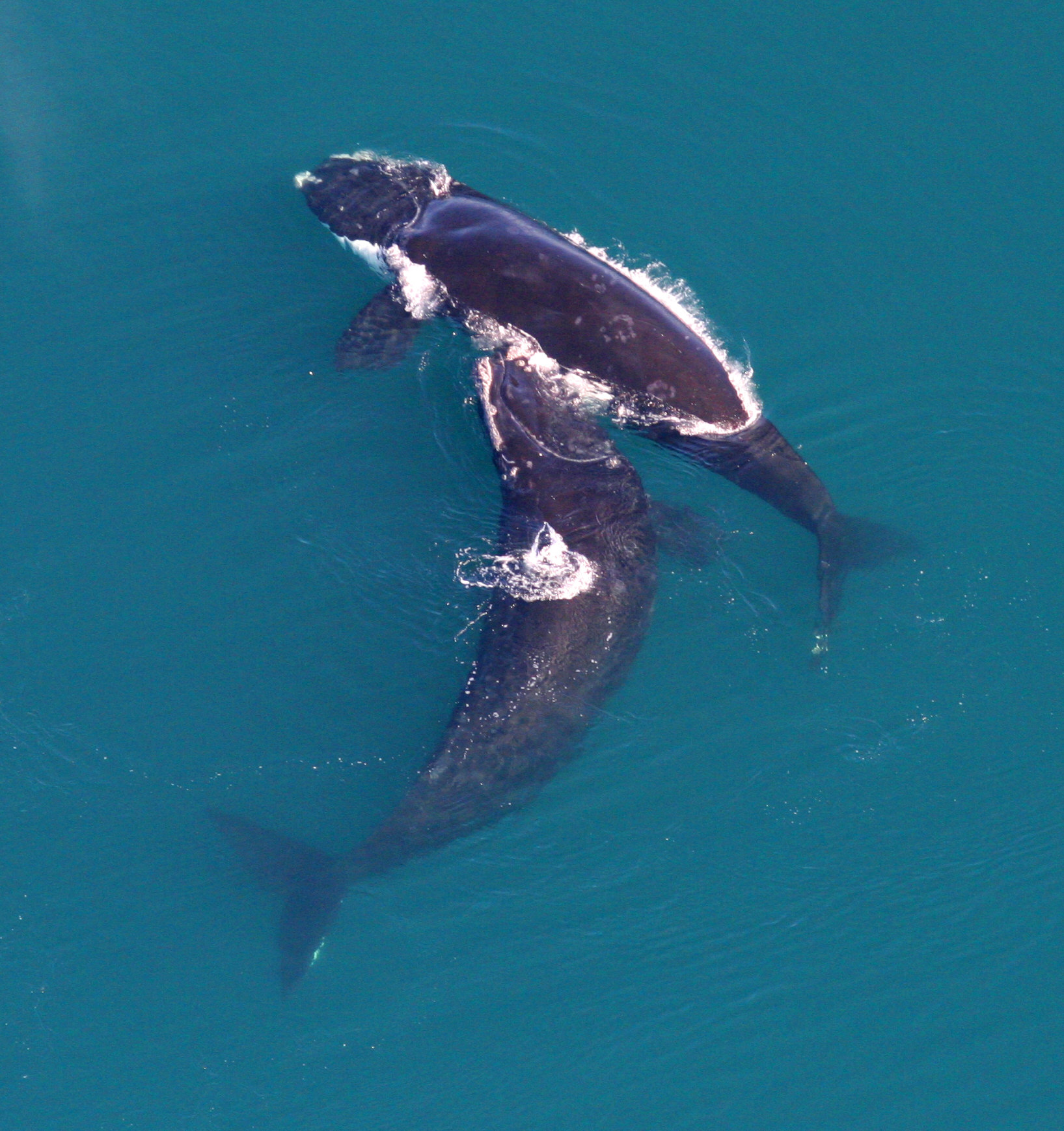
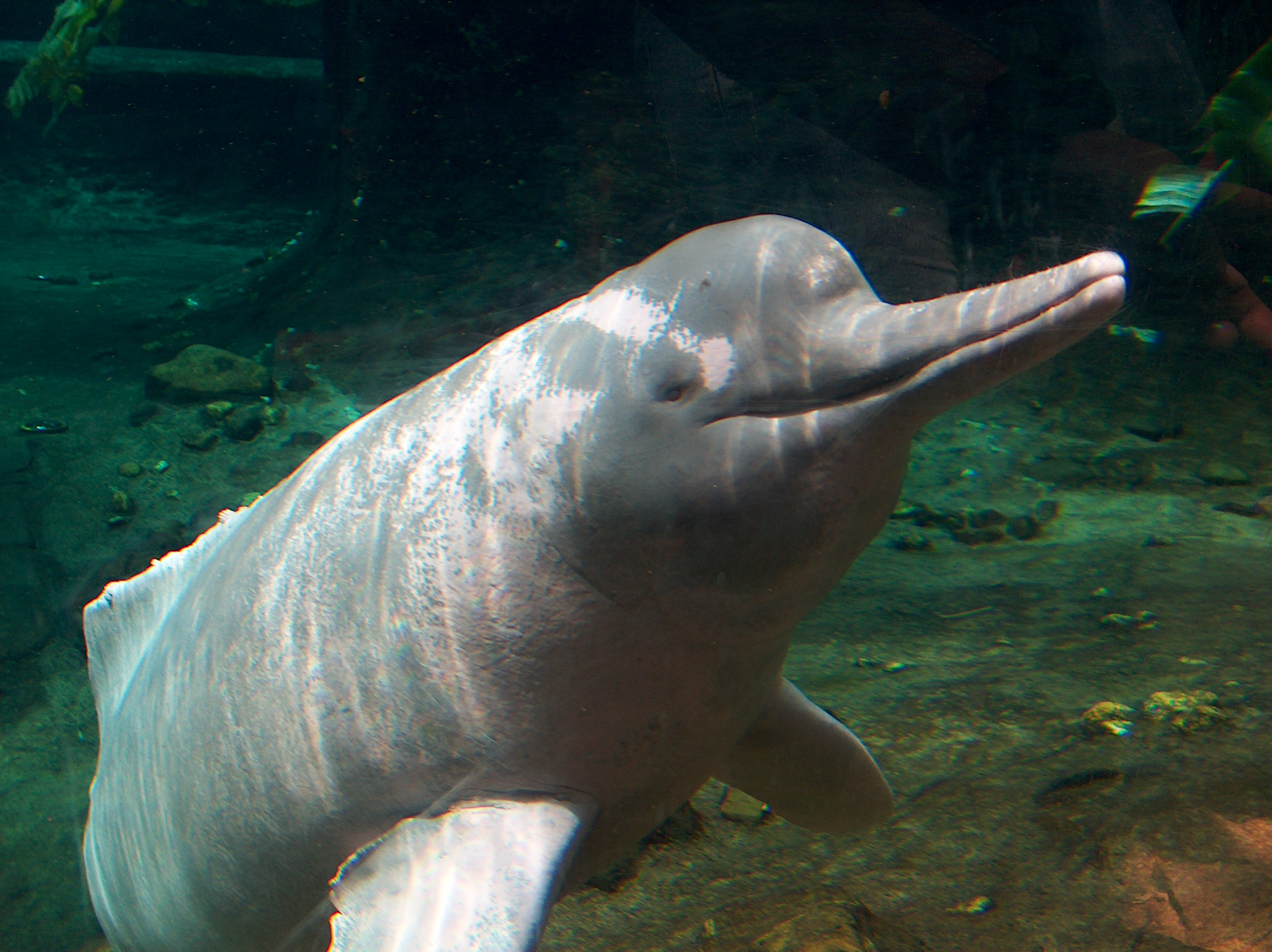
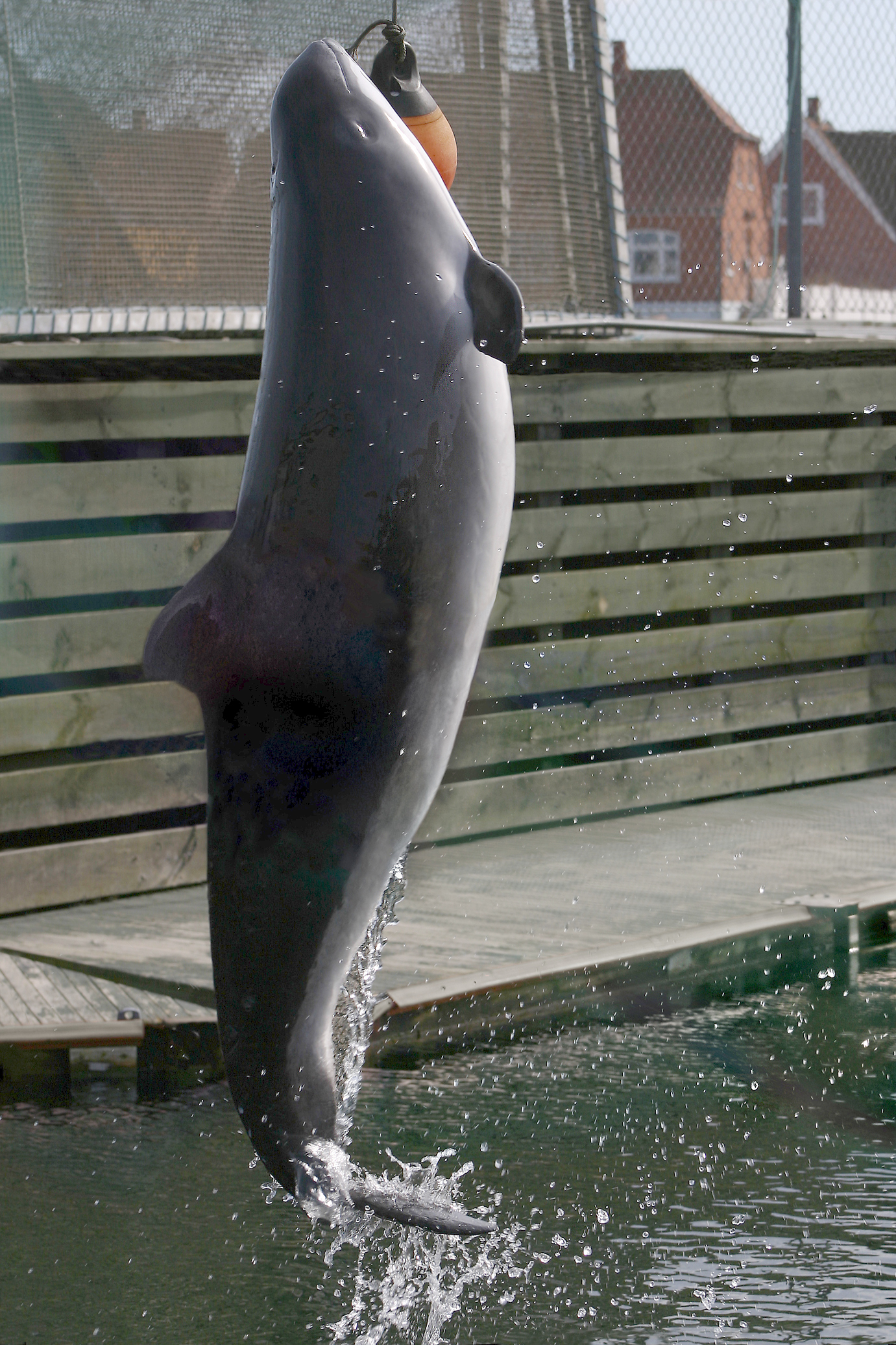
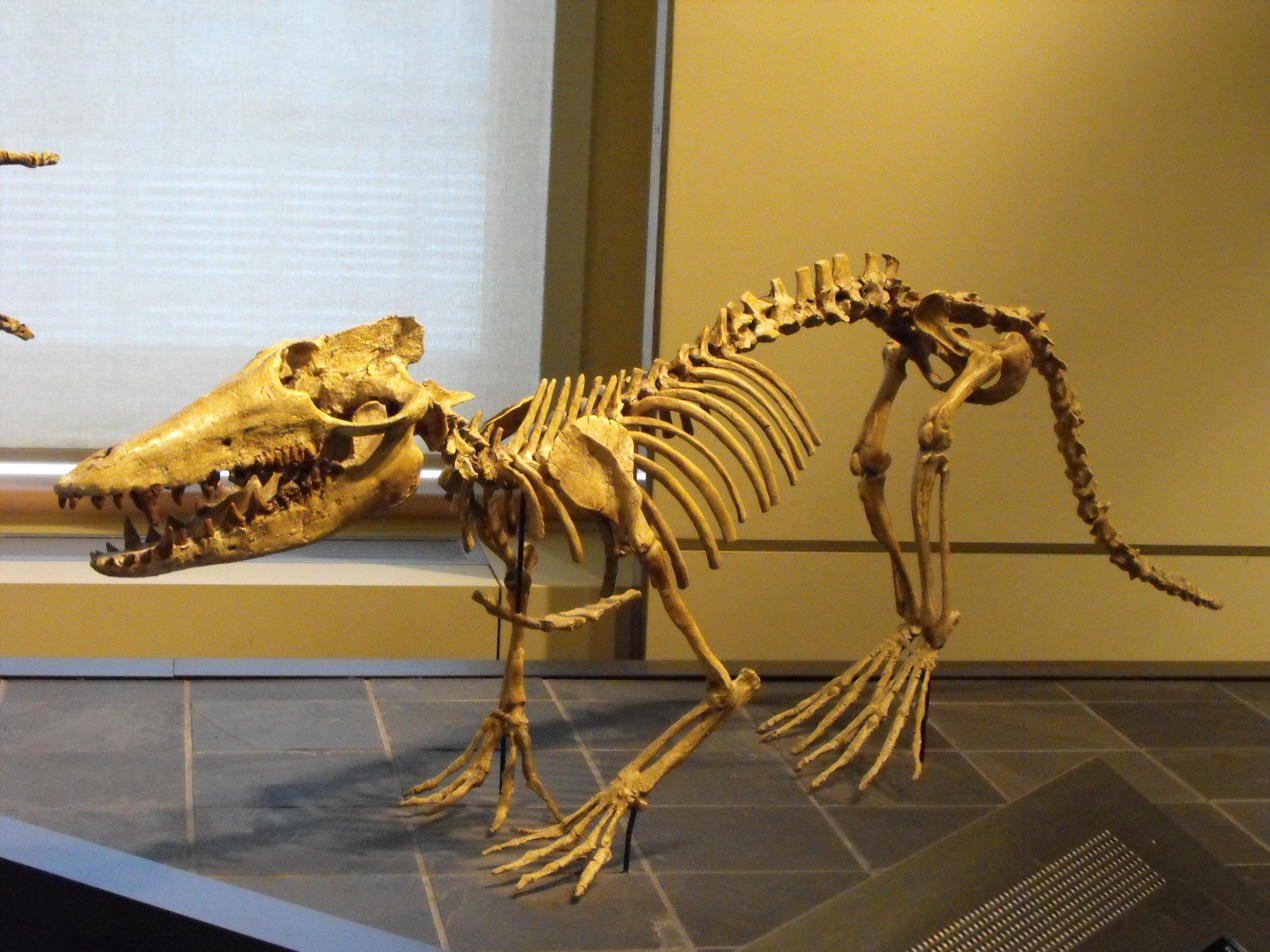
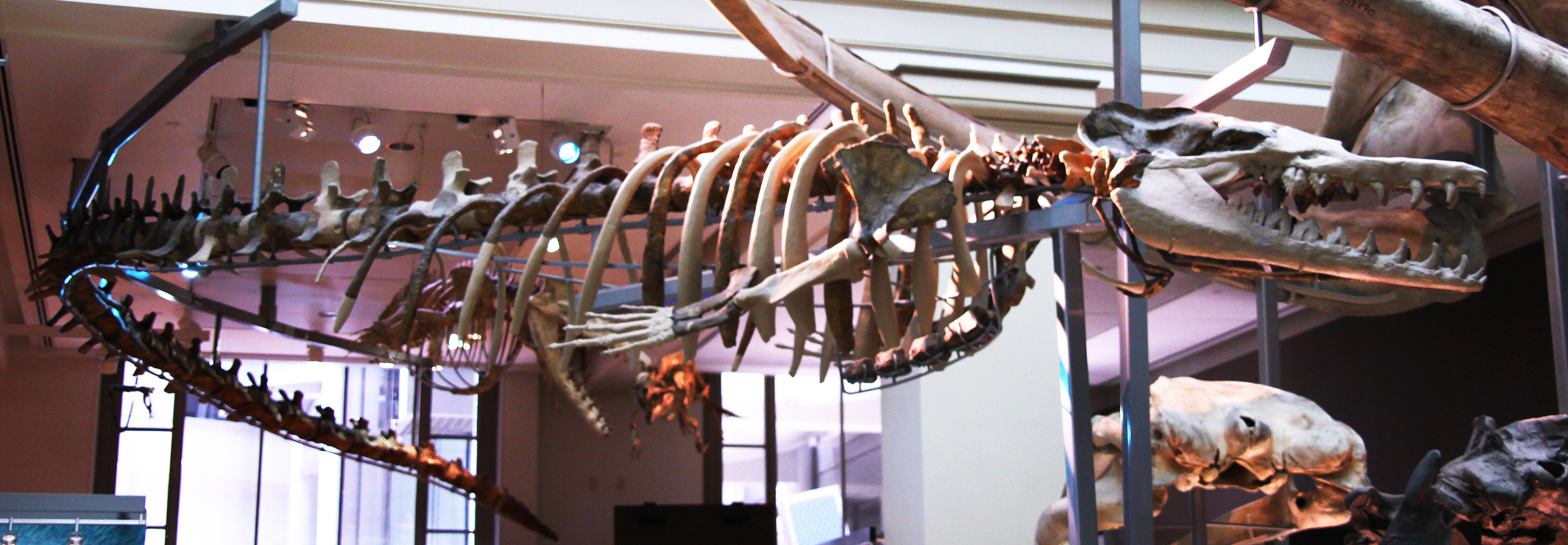
- Sperm whale Humpback whale Orca North Atlantic right whale Amazon river dolphin Harbor porpoise Pakicetus Basilosaurus

Scientific classification
- Kingdom: Animalia
- Phylum: Chordata
- Class: Mammalia
- Order: Artiodactyla
- Clade: Cetaceamorpha
- Infraorder: Cetacea; Brisson, 1762

Subgroups
- †Kalakocetidae; †Pakicetidae; †Ambulocetidae; †Remingtonocetidae; †Protocetidae (paraphyletic); Pelagiceti Uhen, 2008; †Basilosauridae (paraphyletic); †Kekenodontidae; Neoceti Fordyce & de Muizon, 2001; Mysticeti; Odontoceti; (see text for families)

Diversity
- Around 94 species

= Cetacean =

Cetacean Temporal range: 53.5–0 Ma Early Eocene–present

Infraorder of marine mammals

Cetaceans are marine mammals belonging to the infraorder Cetacea (/sɪˈteɪʃə/), a secondarily aquatic clade under the order Artiodactyla that include whales, dolphins, porpoises and numerous extinct groups such as the terrestrial Pakicetidae, the semiaquatic Ambulocetidae, and the fully aquatic Basilosauridae. Cetaceans are found in all the Earth's oceans and live in all habitats from polar waters to the tropics; from the deep open ocean (epi- meso- and into the bathypelagic zones), over coastal and brackish waters and even into freshwater in some of the largest rivers. Many of the larger species are truly cosmopolitic and several of the large species migrate long distances seasonally between breeding and foraging grounds (best known are humpback whales, gray whales, and right whales) and others migrate in irregular patterns across oceans (the rorquals, except for the humpback whale).

Key characteristics of cetaceans are their fully aquatic life cycle, streamlined, fish-like body shape, the need to periodically surface and breathe air, and exclusively carnivorous diet. Some cetaceans — the toothed whales — are capable of echolocation.

As nektonic animals, cetaceans propel themselves through the water with powerful up-and-down movements of their tails, which have evolved into in a horizontal paddle-like fluke. Their hindlimbs have disappeared with only some vestigial skeleton of the pelvis and femurs, and their forelimbs have evolved into flippers which they use to paddle and steer. Some fast-swimming groups, most notably the smaller dolphins and porpoises, have a dorsal fin to facilitate directional stability. Cetaceans also have large brains and have high intelligence, complex social behaviour, and song-like communication. Some cetaceans have large bodies, such as the blue whale, which reaches a maximum confirmed length of 29.9 meters (98 feet) and a weight of 173 tonnes (190 short tons), making it the largest animal known to have existed.

There are approximately 90 living cetacean species split into two parvorders: Odontoceti or toothed whales, which contains 75 species including porpoises, dolphins, the beaked whales and other predatory whales like the beluga and sperm whale, who prey upon fish, cephalopods and other marine mammals such as pinnipeds; and Mysticeti or baleen whales, which contains 15 species of large whales including the blue whale, humpback whale and bowhead whale among others, who are mostly filter-feeding planktivores (or sometimes bottom-feeding crustacivores or molluscivores, as in the case of the gray whale) using oral bristle plates known as baleen to sieve out and feed on large swarms of small invertebrates, usually crustaceans such as krill. Despite their highly modified bodies and carnivorous lifestyle, genetic and fossil evidence places cetaceans within the terrestrial even-toed ungulates, most closely related to the hippopotamids.

Since the Industrial Revolution, cetaceans have been extensively hunted by humans for their meat, blubber and oil by commercial whaling operations. Although the International Whaling Commission has agreed on putting a halt to commercial whaling, whale hunting is still ongoing, either under IWC quotas to assist the subsistence of Arctic native peoples, or for scientific research, despite a large spectrum of non-lethal methods now available to study marine mammals in the wild. Cetaceans also face severe environmental hazards from underwater noise pollution, entanglement in ropes and nets, ship strikes (especially against propellers), build-up of heavy metals and plastic pollutions, food scarcity due to overfishing down the food web, and anthropogenic climate change, but how much they are affected varies widely from species to species, from minimally in the case of the southern bottlenose whale to the functional extinction of baiji (Chinese river dolphin) due to impacts of human shipping activity.

== Etymology ==
The scientific name Cetacea comes from Latin cetus, meaning "whale"; which in turn comes from Ancient Greek κῆτος (kêtos), meaning "huge fish" or "sea monster"

== Baleen whales and toothed whales ==
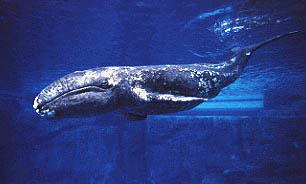
Gray whale swimming

Baleen whales (Mysticeti) and toothed whales (Odontoceti) are thought to have diverged from one another around thirty-four million years ago. Ninety extant (currently living) species of whale are currently accepted, with 75 being toothed whales and the remaining 15 baleen whales.

Baleen whales have bristles made of keratin instead of teeth. Gray whales (Eschrichtiidae) feed on bottom-dwelling mollusks. Baleen whales belonging to the rorqual family (Balaenopteridae) use throat pleats to expand their mouths to take in small invertebrates like krill and sieve out the water. Right whales and bowhead whales (family Balaenidae) have massive heads that can make up 40% of their body mass. Most mysticetes prefer the food-rich colder waters around the poles of the Northern and Southern Hemispheres, migrating to the Equator to give birth. During this process, they are capable of fasting for several months, relying on their fat reserves.

The toothed whales include sperm whales, beaked whales, dolphins and porpoises. These whales have teeth evolved to catch fish, squid or other marine invertebrates and swallow their prey whole instead of chewing it. Tooth shape can vary between groups, with cone-shaped teeth in dolphins and sperm whales, spade-shaped teeth in porpoises, peg-like teeth in belugas, tusks in narwhals and many different shapes in the ornamental teeth of male beaked whales. The teeth of female beaked whales are hidden in the gums and are not visible, and most male beaked whales have only two short tusks. Narwhals have vestigial teeth alongside their tusk, which is present on males and 15% of females. A few toothed whales, such as some orcas, feed on marine mammals such as pinnipeds and other whales.

Toothed whales have well-developed senses. Their eyesight and hearing are adapted for both air and water, and they can echolocate by producing sounds and using their melon. Some species—such as sperm whales and beaked whales—are well adapted for diving to great depths. Several species of toothed whales show sexual dimorphism, in which the males differ from the females, usually for purposes of sexual display or aggression.

== Anatomy ==
Dolphin anatomy

Cetacean bodies are generally similar to those of fish, which can be attributed to their lifestyle and similar habitat conditions. Their body is well-adapted to their habitat, although they share essential characteristics with other higher mammals (Eutheria). Most notably, whales have a streamlined shape, and their forelimbs are flippers. Almost all have a dorsal fin on their backs, but this can take on many forms, depending on the species. A few species, such as the beluga whale, lack them. Both the flipper and the fin are for stabilization and steering in the water. The body is wrapped in a thick layer of fat, known as blubber. This provides thermal insulation and gives cetaceans their smooth, streamlined body shape. In larger species, it can reach a thickness up to 50 centimeters (1.6 feet). Hind legs are not present in cetaceans, nor are any other external body attachments such as a pinna.

The reproductive organs of both sexes and the mammary glands of females are sunken into the body. The male genitals are attached to a vestigial pelvis.

Sexual dimorphism is prominent in many species of toothed whale, including sperm whales, narwhals, many members of the beaked whale family and several species of the porpoise and dolphin families. In some of these species, males have developed external features absent in females that are advantageous in combat or display. For example, many male beaked whales possess tusks which are used in competition and absent in females.

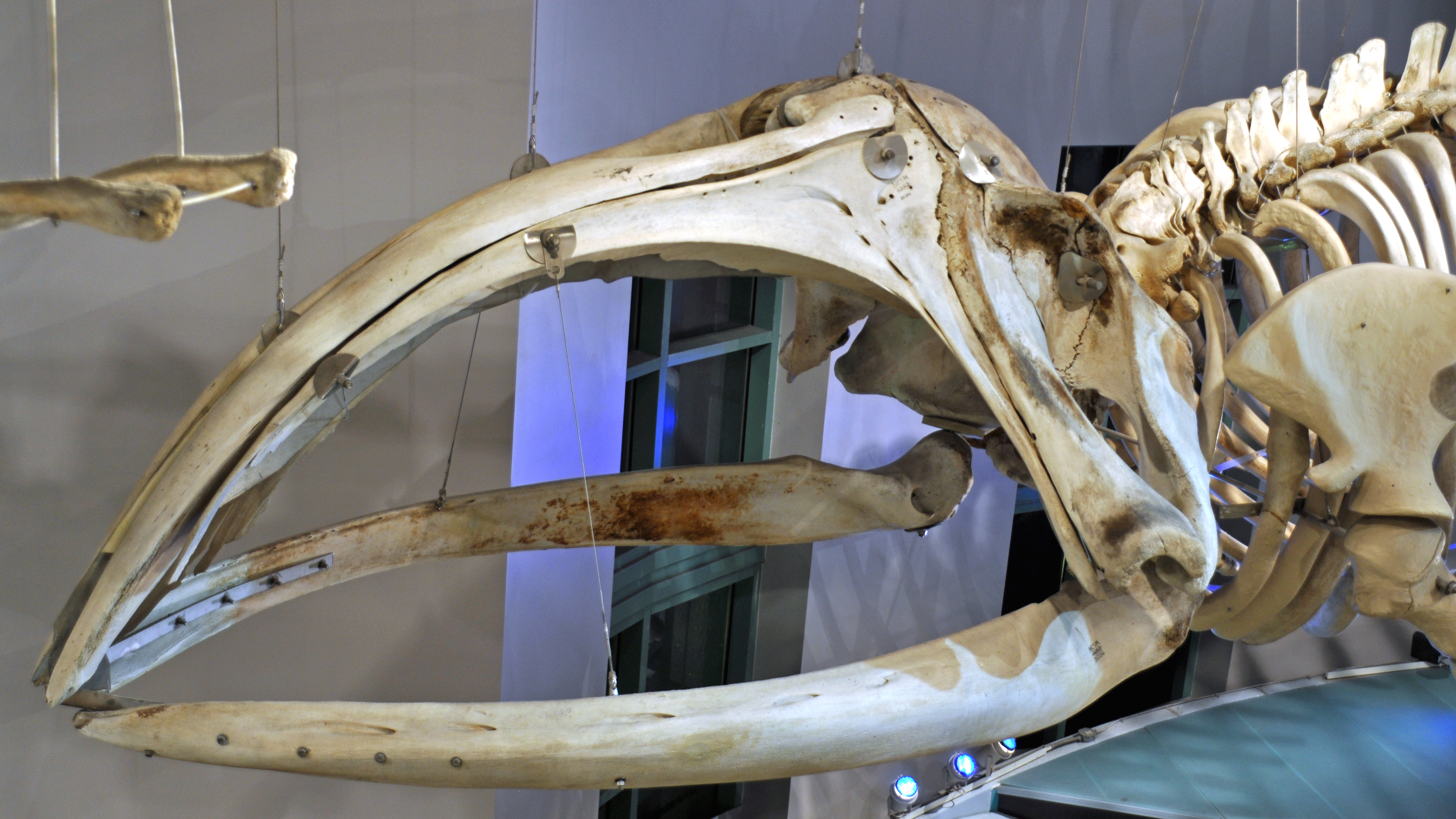
Skull of a North Atlantic right whale

=== Head ===
Whales have an elongated head, especially baleen whales, due to the wide overhanging jaw. The jaws contain either teeth or baleen in species of the respective groups. Baleen is made up of long, fibrous strands of keratin. Located in place of the teeth of the upper jaw, it has the appearance of a huge fringe and is used to sieve the water for prey items. When present, the teeth or baleen in the upper jaw sit exclusively on the maxilla.

Their nostril(s) make up the blowhole, which has one opening in toothed whales and two in baleen whales. The nostrils are located on top of the head above the eyes so that the rest of the body can remain submerged while surfacing for air. By shifting the nostrils to the top of the head, the nasal passages extend perpendicularly through the skull. The back of the skull is significantly shortened and deformed, and the braincase is concentrated forwards through the nasal passage and is heightened, with individual cranial bones overlapping. Most cetaceans have fused neck vertebrae and are unable to turn their head at all, but river dolphins retain this ability.

Many toothed whales show a depression in the front of their skull, which houses a large mass of fat known as a melon and multiple asymmetric air bags. These soft tissues aid in biosonar and buoyancy, respectively. The sperm whale has a particularly pronounced melon and the shape of their head is further changed by the presence of the spermaceti organ, which contains the eponymous spermaceti, hence the name "sperm whale".

=== Skeleton ===
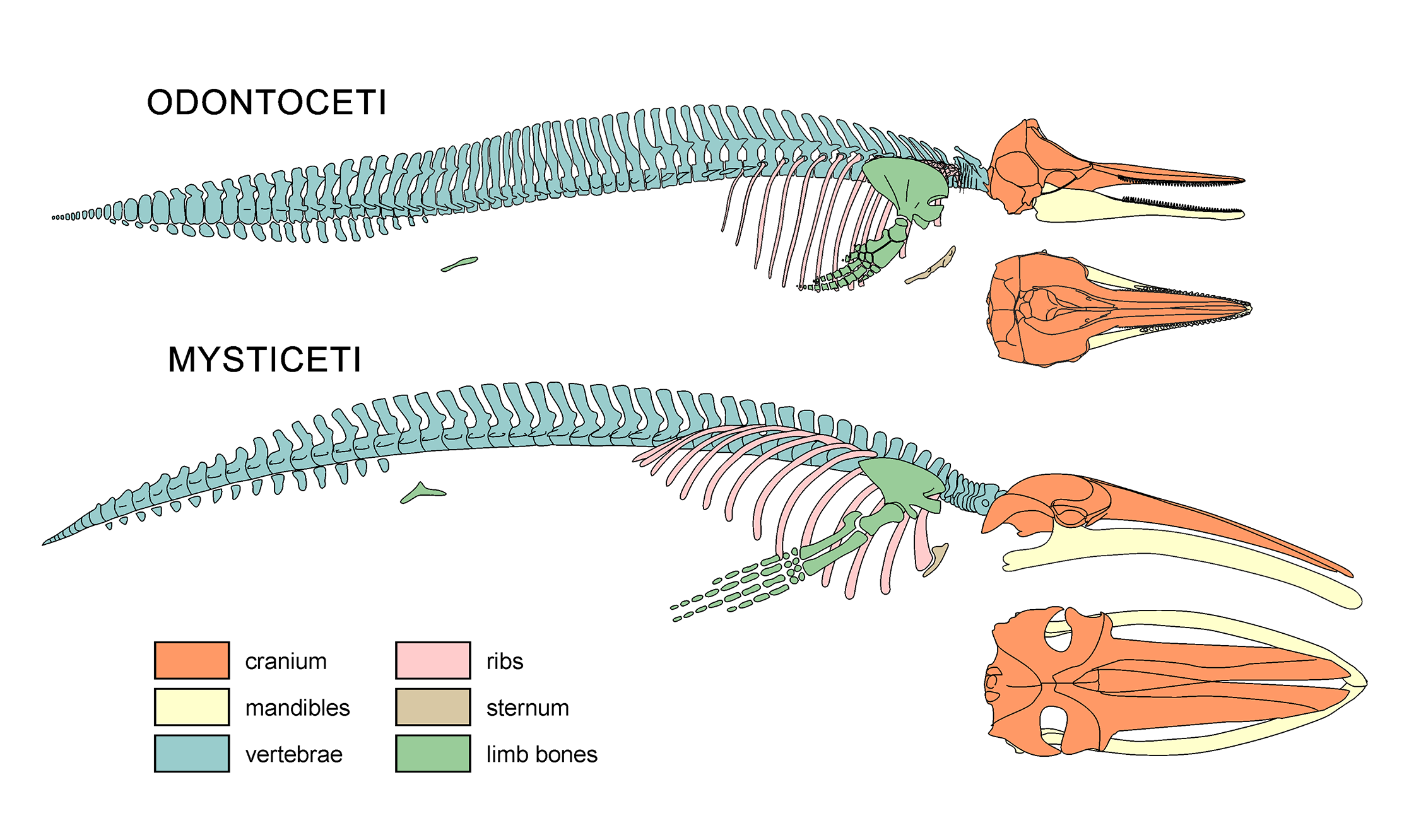
Diagram featuring the typical skeletal system of a toothed whale (top) and a baleen whale (bottom)

The cetacean skeleton is largely made up of dense cortical bone, which stabilizes the animal in the water. For this reason, the usual terrestrial compact bones, which are finely woven cancellous bone, are replaced with lighter and more elastic material. In many places, bone elements are replaced by cartilage and even fat, thereby improving their hydrostatic qualities. The ear and parts of the snout contain a high-density bone structure that is exclusive to cetaceans and resembles porcelain. This conducts sound better than other bones, thus aiding biosonar.

The number of vertebrae that make up the spine varies by species, ranging from 40 to 93. The neck consists of seven vertebrae which are reduced or fused, providing stability during swimming at the expense of mobility. The fins are carried by the thoracic vertebrae, ranging from nine to seventeen individual vertebrae. The sternum is cartilaginous. The last two to three pairs of ribs are not connected and hang freely in the body. The stable lumbar and tail include the other vertebrae. The caudal vertebrae can be identified by the chevron bone, which hangs underneath them.

The front limbs are paddle-shaped with shortened arms and elongated finger bones, to support movement. They are connected by cartilage. The second and third fingers display a proliferation of the finger members, a so-called hyperphalangy. The shoulder joint is the only functional joint in all cetaceans except for the Amazon river dolphin. The collarbone is completely absent.

=== Fluke ===
Cetaceans have a cartilaginous fluke at the end of their tails that is used for propulsion. The fluke is set horizontally on the body and used with vertical movements, unlike fish, which have vertical tail flukes that move horizontally.

== Physiology ==
=== Brain ===
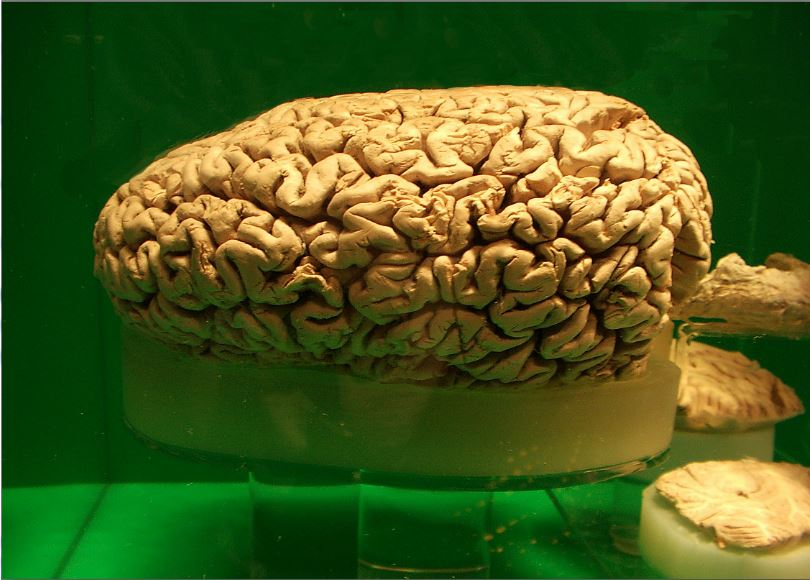
Brain of the sperm whale, considered the largest brain in the world

In cetaceans, evolution in the water has caused changes to the head that have modified brain shape such that the brain folds around the insula and expands more laterally than in terrestrial mammals. As a result, the cetacean prefrontal cortex (compared to that in humans) rather than frontal is laterally positioned. The neocortex of many cetaceans is home to elongated spindle neurons that, prior to 2019, were known only in hominids. In humans, these cells are thought to be involved in social conduct, emotions, judgment and theory of mind. Cetacean spindle neurons are found in the same areas of the brain where they are found in humans, suggesting they perform a similar function.

The brain to body mass ratio in some odontocetes, such as belugas and narwhals, is second only to that seen in humans. In some whales, however, it is less than half that of humans: 0.9% versus 2.1%. Sperm whales have the largest brain mass of any animal on Earth, averaging 8,000 cm^{3} (490 in^{3}) and 7.8 kg (17 lb) in mature males. Brain size was previously considered a major indicator of intelligence. Since most of the brain is used for maintaining bodily functions, greater ratios of brain to body mass (weight) may increase the amount of brain mass available for cognitive tasks. Allometric analysis of the relationship between mammalian brain and body mass for different species of mammals shows that larger species generally have larger brains. However, this increase is not fully proportional. Typically the brain mass only increases in proportion to somewhere between the two-thirds power (or the square of the cube root) and the three-quarters power (or the cube of the fourth root) of the body mass. m_{brain} ∝ (m_{body})^{k} where k is between two-thirds and three-quarters. Thus if Species B is twice the size of Species A, its brain size will typically be somewhere between 60% and 70% higher. Comparison of a particular animal's brain size with the expected brain size based on such an analysis provides an encephalization quotient that can be used as an indication of animal intelligence.

=== Senses ===
==== Vision ====
Cetacean eyes are set on the sides rather than the front of the head. This means only species with pointed 'beaks' (such as dolphins) have good binocular vision forward and downward. Tear glands secrete greasy tears, which protect the eyes from the salt in the water. The cornea of cetaceans has very little ability to bend light underwater. To compensate for this, most cetaceans have almost spherical lenses. This rounded shape provides greater refractive power, allowing the lens to effectively focus images onto the retina.

==== Chemical senses ====
Odontocetes have little to no ability to taste or smell, while mysticetes are believed to have some ability to smell because of their reduced, but functional olfactory system.

==== Electroreception ====
At least one species, the tucuxi or Guiana dolphin, is able to use electroreception to sense prey.

==== Echolocation ====
Biosonar

Toothed whales are generally capable of echolocation. They can discern the size, shape, surface characteristics, distance and movement of an object. Because of this they can search for, chase and catch fast-swimming prey in total darkness. Echolocation clicks also contain characteristic details unique to each animal, which may suggest that toothed whales can discern between their own clicks from those of others.

While differences in ear structure associated with echolocating abilities are found amongst Cetacea, cranial asymmetry has also been found to be a factor in the ability to produce sounds used in echolocation. Mysticeti, who don't have the ability to echolocate, possess general symmetry of the skull and facial region, while Odontoceti display a nasofacial asymmetry that is linked to their echolocating abilities. Differences in the level of asymmetry also seem to correlate with differences in the types of sounds produced.

=== Ears ===
Cetaceans are known to possess excellent hearing.

The external ear has lost the pinna (visible ear), but still retains a narrow ear canal. The three small bones or ossicles that transmit sound within each ear are dense and compact, and differently shaped from those of land mammals. The semicircular canals are much smaller relative to body size than in other mammals.

A bony structure of the middle and inner ear, the auditory bulla, is composed of two compact and dense bones (the periotic and tympanic). It is housed in a cavity in the middle ear; in all toothed whales, with the exception of sperm whales, this cavity is filled with dense foam and completely surrounds the bulla, which is connected to the skull only by ligaments. This may isolate the ear from sounds transmitted through the bones of the skull, something that also happens in bats. Baleen whales have exceptionally thin, wide basilar membranes in their cochleae without stiffening agents, making their ears adapted for processing low to infrasonic frequencies.

Cetaceans use sound to communicate, using groans, moans, whistles, clicks or the 'singing' of the humpback whale.

=== Circulation ===
Cetaceans have powerful hearts. Blood oxygen is distributed effectively throughout the body. They are warm-blooded, meaning that they hold a nearly constant internal body temperature.

=== Respiration ===
Cetaceans have lungs, which means that they breathe air. An individual can last without a breath from a few minutes to over two hours depending on the species. Whales are deliberate breathers: they must be awake to inhale and exhale. When stale air, warmed from the lungs, is exhaled, it condenses as it meets colder external air. As with a terrestrial mammal breathing out on a cold day, a small cloud of 'steam' appears. This is called the 'spout' and varies across species in shape, angle and height. Species can be identified at a distance using this characteristic.

The structure of the respiratory and circulatory systems is of particular importance for the life of marine mammals. The oxygen balance is effective. Each breath can replace up to 90% of the total lung volume. For land mammals, in comparison, this value is usually about 15%. During inhalation, about twice as much oxygen is absorbed by the lung tissue as in a land mammal. As with all mammals, the oxygen is stored in the blood and the lungs, but in cetaceans, it is also stored in various tissues, mainly in the muscles. Here, this happens through the muscle pigment, myoglobin, provides an effective bond. This additional oxygen storage is vital for deep diving, since beyond a depth around 100 m (330 ft), the lung tissue is almost completely compressed by the water pressure.

=== Abdominal organs ===
The stomach consists of three chambers. The first region is formed by a loose gland and a muscular forestomach (missing in beaked whales); this is followed by the main stomach and the pylorus. Both are equipped with glands to help digestion. A bowel adjoins the stomachs, whose individual sections can only be distinguished histologically. The liver is large and separate from the gall bladder. The kidneys are long and flattened. The salt concentration in cetacean blood is lower than that in seawater, requiring kidneys to excrete salt. This allows the animals to drink seawater. The urinary bladder is proportionally smaller in cetaceans than in land mammals. The testes are located internally, without an external scrotum. The uterus is bicornuate.

=== Chromosomes ===
The initial karyotype includes a set of chromosomes from 2n = 44. They have four pairs of telocentric chromosomes (whose centromeres sit at one of the telomeres), two to four pairs of subtelocentric and one or two large pairs of submetacentric chromosomes. The remaining chromosomes are metacentric—the centromere is approximately in the middle—and are rather small. All cetaceans have chromosomes 2n = 44, except the sperm whales and pygmy sperm whales, which have 2n = 42.

== Ecology ==
=== Range and habitat ===
Cetaceans are found in many aquatic habitats. While many marine species, such as the blue whale, the humpback whale and the orca, have a distribution area that includes nearly the entire ocean, some species occur only locally or in broken populations. These include the vaquita, which inhabits a small part of the Gulf of California and Hector's dolphin, which lives in some coastal waters in New Zealand. Most river dolphin species live exclusively in fresh water.

Many species inhabit specific latitudes, often in tropical or subtropical waters, such as Bryde's whale or Risso's dolphin. Others are found only in a specific body of water. The southern right whale dolphin and the hourglass dolphin live only in the Southern Ocean. The narwhal and the beluga live only in the Arctic Ocean. Sowerby's beaked whale and the Clymene dolphin exist only in the Atlantic and the Pacific white-sided dolphin and the northern straight dolphin live only in the North Pacific.

Cosmopolitan species may be found in the Pacific, Atlantic and Indian Oceans. However, northern and southern populations become genetically separated over time. In some species, this separation leads eventually to a divergence of the species, such as produced the southern right whale, North Pacific right whale and North Atlantic right whale. Migratory species' reproductive sites often lie in the tropics and their feeding grounds in polar regions.

Thirty-four species are found in European waters, including twenty-five toothed and seven baleen species.

=== Whale migration ===
Many species of whales migrate on a latitudinal basis to move between seasonal habitats. For example, the gray whale migrates 10,000 miles (16,000 km) round trip. The journey begins at winter birthing grounds in warm lagoons along Baja California, and traverses 5,000–7,000 miles (8,000–11,300 km) of coastline to summer feeding grounds in the Bering, Chuckchi and Beaufort seas off the coast of Alaska.

== Behaviour ==
=== Sleep ===
Conscious breathing cetaceans sleep but cannot afford to be unconscious for long, because they may drown. While knowledge of sleep in wild cetaceans is limited, toothed cetaceans in captivity have been recorded to exhibit unihemispheric slow-wave sleep (USWS), which means they sleep with one side of their brain at a time, so that they may swim, breathe consciously and avoid both predators and social contact during their period of rest.

A 2008 study found that sperm whales sleep in vertical postures just under the surface in passive shallow 'drift-dives', generally during the day, during which whales do not respond to passing vessels unless they are in contact, leading to the suggestion that whales possibly sleep during such dives.

=== Diving ===
While diving, the animals reduce their oxygen consumption by lowering the heart activity and blood circulation; individual organs receive no oxygen during this time. Some rorquals can dive for up to 40 minutes, sperm whales between 60 and 90 minutes and bottlenose whales for two hours. Diving depths average about 100 m (330 ft). Species such as sperm whales can dive to 3,000 m (9,800 ft), although more commonly 1,200 metres (3,900 ft).

=== Social relations ===
Most cetaceans are social animals, although a few species live in pairs or are solitary. A group, known as a pod, usually consists of ten to fifty animals, but on occasion, such as mass availability of food or during mating season, groups may encompass more than one thousand individuals. Inter-species socialization can occur.

Pods have a fixed hierarchy, with the priority positions determined by biting, pushing or ramming. The behavior in the group is aggressive only in situations of stress such as lack of food, but usually it is peaceful. Contact swimming, mutual fondling and nudging are common. The playful behavior of the animals, which is manifested in air jumps, somersaults, surfing, or fin hitting, occurs more often than not in smaller cetaceans, such as dolphins and porpoises.

=== Whale song ===
Males in some baleen species communicate via whale song, sequences of high pitched sounds. These "songs" can be heard for hundreds of kilometers. Each population generally shares a distinct song, which evolves over time. Sometimes, an individual can be identified by its distinctive vocals, such as the 52-hertz whale that sings at a higher frequency than other whales. Some individuals are capable of generating over 600 distinct sounds. In baleen species such as humpbacks, blues and fins, male-specific song is believed to be used to attract and display fitness to females.

=== Hunting ===
Pod groups also hunt, often with other species. Many species of dolphins accompany large tunas on hunting expeditions, following large schools of fish. The orca hunts in pods and targets belugas and even larger whales. Humpback whales, among others, form in collaboration bubble nets to herd krill or plankton into bait balls before lunging at them.

=== Intelligence ===
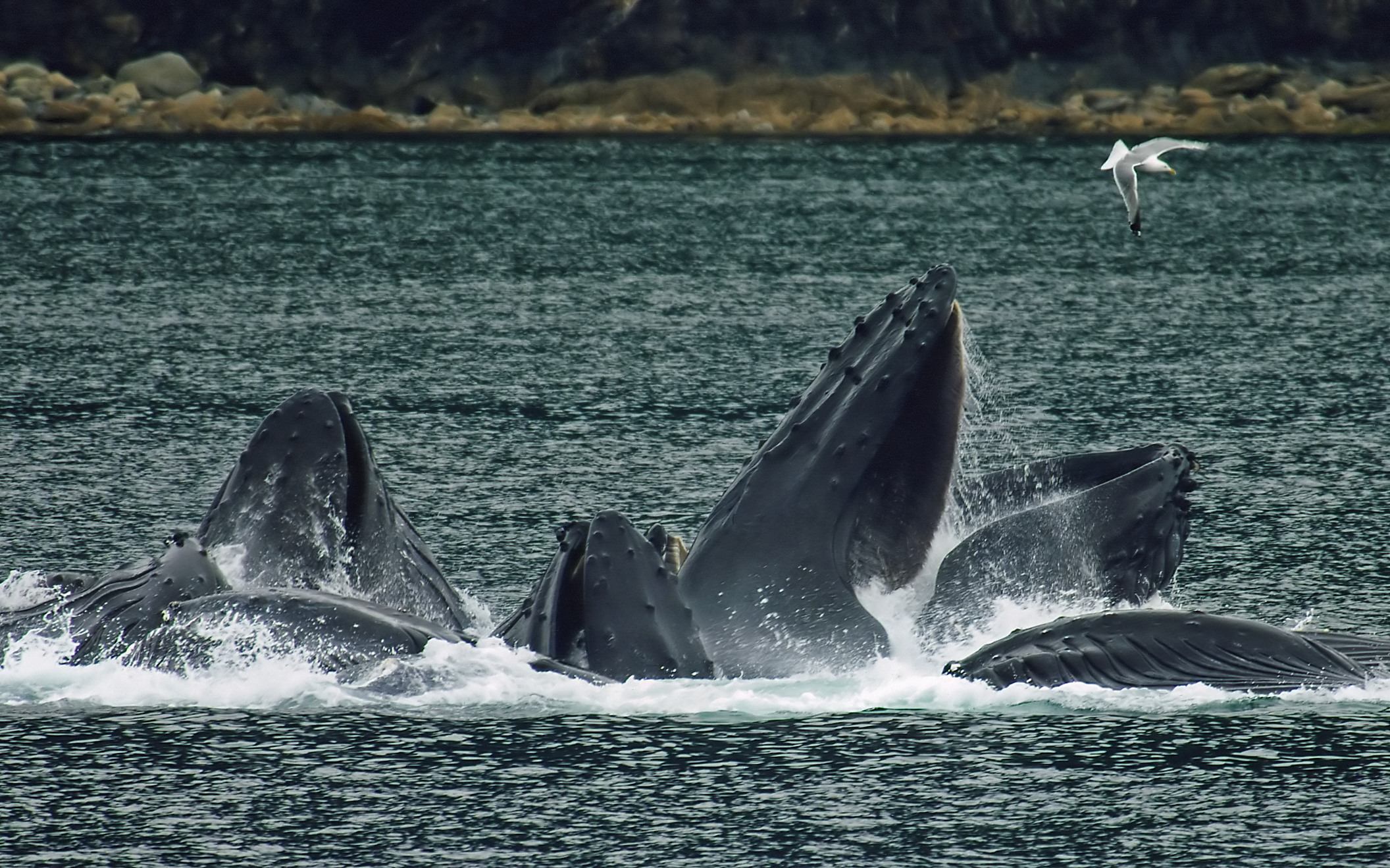
Bubble net feeding

Cetacea are known to teach, learn, cooperate, scheme and grieve.

Smaller cetaceans, such as dolphins and porpoises, engage in complex play behavior, including such things as producing stable underwater toroidal air-core vortex rings or "bubble rings". The two main methods of bubble ring production are rapid puffing of air into the water and allowing it to rise to the surface, forming a ring, or swimming repeatedly in a circle and then stopping to inject air into the helical vortex currents thus formed. They also appear to enjoy biting the vortex rings, so that they burst into many separate bubbles and then rise quickly to the surface. Whales produce bubble nets to aid in herding prey.

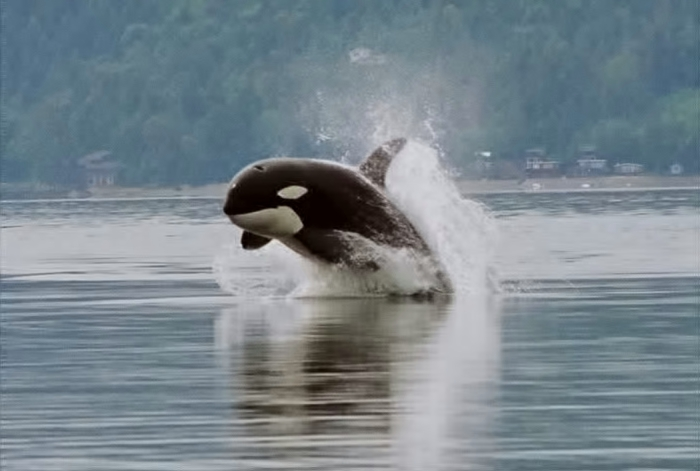
Killer whale porpoising

Larger whales are also thought to engage in play. The southern right whale elevates its tail fluke above the water, remaining in the same position for a considerable time. This is known as "sailing". It appears to be a form of play and is most commonly seen off the coast of Argentina and South Africa. Humpback whales also display this behaviour.

Self-awareness appears to be a sign of abstract thinking. Self-awareness, although not well-defined, is believed to be a precursor to more advanced processes such as metacognitive reasoning (thinking about thinking) that humans exploit. Dolphins appear to possess self-awareness. The most widely used test for self-awareness in animals is the mirror test, in which a temporary dye is placed on an animal's body and the animal is then presented with a mirror. Researchers then explore whether the animal shows signs of self-recognition.

Critics claim that the results of these tests are susceptible to the Clever Hans effect. This test is much less definitive than when used for primates. Primates can touch the mark or the mirror, while dolphins cannot, making their alleged self-recognition behavior less certain. Skeptics argue that behaviors said to identify self-awareness resemble existing social behaviors, so researchers could be misinterpreting self-awareness for social responses. Advocates counter that the behaviors are different from normal responses to another individual. Dolphins show less definitive behavior of self-awareness, because they have no pointing ability.

In 1995, Marten and Psarakos used video to test dolphin self-awareness. They showed dolphins real-time footage of themselves, recorded footage and another dolphin. They concluded that their evidence suggested self-awareness rather than social behavior. While this particular study has not been replicated, dolphins later "passed" the mirror test.

=== Decision-making ===
Collective decisions are an important part of life as a cetacean for the many species that spend time in groups (whether these be temporary such as the fission-fusion dynamics of many smaller dolphin species or long-term stable associations as are seen in killer whale and sperm whale matrilines). Little is known about how these decisions work, though studies have found evidence messy consensus decisions in groups of sperm whales and leadership in other species like bottlenose dolphins and killer whales.

== Life history ==
=== Reproduction and brooding ===
Most cetaceans sexually mature at seven to 10 years. An exception to this is the La Plata dolphin, which is sexually mature at two years, but lives only to about 20. The sperm whale reaches sexual maturity within about 20 years and has a lifespan between 50 and 100 years.

For most species, reproduction is seasonal. Ovulation coincides with male fertility. This cycle is usually coupled with seasonal movements that can be observed in many species. Most toothed whales have no fixed bonds. In many species, females choose several partners during a season. Although traditionally thought to be monogamous, research has shown that Baleen whales are promiscuous, with none showing pair bonds.

Gestation ranges from 9 to 16 months. Duration is not necessarily a function of size. Porpoises and blue whales gestate for about 11 months. Like all placental mammals, cetaceans are viviparous. Cetaceans usually bear one calf- in the case of twins, one usually dies, because the mother cannot produce sufficient milk for both. In modern cetaceans, the fetus is usually positioned for a tail-first delivery. Contrary to popular belief, this is not to minimize the risk of drowning during delivery. More likely it has to do with the mechanics of birthing and the shape of the fetus. After birth, the mother carries the infant to the surface for its first breath. At birth, they are about one-third of their adult length and tend to be independently active, comparable to terrestrial mammals.

==== Suckling ====
Like other placental mammals, cetaceans give birth to well-developed calves and nurse them with milk from their mammary glands. When suckling, the mother actively splashes milk into the mouth of the calf, using the muscles of her mammary glands, as the calf has no lips. This milk usually has a high-fat content, ranging from 16 to 46%, causing the calf to increase rapidly in size and weight.

In many small cetaceans, suckling lasts for about four months. In large species, it lasts for over a year and involves a strong bond between mother and offspring.

In several species of both whales and dolphins, alloparenting has been observed.

This reproductive strategy provides a few offspring that have a high survival rate.

=== Lifespan ===
Among cetaceans, whales are distinguished by an unusual longevity compared to other higher mammals. Some species, such as the bowhead whale (Balaena mysticetus), can reach over 200 years. Based on the annual rings of the bony otic capsule, the age of the oldest known specimen is a male determined to be 211 years at the time of death.

=== Death ===
Upon death, whale carcasses fall to the deep ocean and provide a substantial habitat for marine life. Evidence of whale falls in present-day and fossil records shows that deep-sea whale falls support a rich assemblage of creatures, with a global diversity of 407 species, comparable to other neritic biodiversity hotspots, such as cold seeps and hydrothermal vents.

Deterioration of whale carcasses happens through three stages. Initially, organisms such as sharks and hagfish scavenge the soft tissues at a rapid rate over a period of months and as long as two years. This is followed by the colonization of bones and surrounding sediments (which contain organic matter) by enrichment opportunists, such as crustaceans and polychaetes, throughout a period of years. Finally, sulfophilic bacteria reduce the bones releasing hydrogen sulfide enabling the growth of chemoautotrophic organisms, which in turn, support organisms such as mussels, clams, limpets and sea snails. This stage may last for decades and supports a rich assemblage of species, averaging 185 per site.

== Disease ==
Brucellosis affects almost all mammals. It is distributed worldwide, while fishing and pollution have caused porpoise population density pockets, which risks further infection and disease spreading. Brucella ceti, most prevalent in dolphins, has been shown to cause chronic disease, increasing the chance of failed birth and miscarriages, male infertility, neurobrucellosis, cardiopathies, bone and skin lesions, strandings and death. Until 2008, no case had ever been reported in porpoises, but isolated populations have an increased risk and consequentially a high mortality rate.

== Evolution and systematics ==
Cetaceans were long grouped as fishes (class Pisces), despite the obvious similarities with terrestrial mammals, such as warm blood, breathing air by lungs, and giving birth to live offspring. Aristotle, however, noted in Historia Animalium the many physiological and anatomical similarities with the terrestrial vertebrates, such as blood (circulation), lungs, uterus, and fin anatomy. His detailed descriptions were assimilated by the Romans, but mixed with a more accurate knowledge of the dolphins, as mentioned by Pliny the Elder in his Natural history. Also Linné grouped cetaceans (together with sirenians) with fishes in the 9. edition of Systema Naturae, but notes their affinity to terrestrial mammals ("quadrupeds", in Linné's terminology):

"All animals of this order resemble quadrupeds rather than fish; their internal structures—lungs, respiration, mammary glands, the penis, the birth of live young, etc.—demonstrate this. Nevertheless, we classify them among fish on account of their respiration, their element (water), their fins, and so forth."

— Linnaeus, Systema Naturae, 9. edition (1756)

In the 10th edition of Systema Natura and onwards, cetaceans were classified as mammals.

The change in classification is likely more about change in language than related to a lack of understanding of the nature of cetaceans. The word "fish" thus traditionally is understood as any animal that lives in the sea, cf. "starfish", "jellyfish", ""cuttlefish", "crayfish" etc. Thus, if a writer refers to cetaceans as "whalefish", this should not be interpreted that the writer believes that whales are fish in a zoological sense, but merely that they live their entire life in water.

=== Fossil history ===
==== Origins ====
The direct ancestors of today's cetaceans are probably found within the Dorudontidae whose most famous member, Dorudon, lived at the same time as Basilosaurus. Both groups had already developed some of the typical anatomical features of today's whales, such as the fixed bulla, which replaces the mammalian eardrum, as well as sound-conducting elements for submerged directional hearing. Their wrists were stiffened and probably contributed to the typical build of flippers. The hind legs existed, however, but were significantly reduced in size and with a vestigial pelvis connection.

==== Transition from land to sea ====
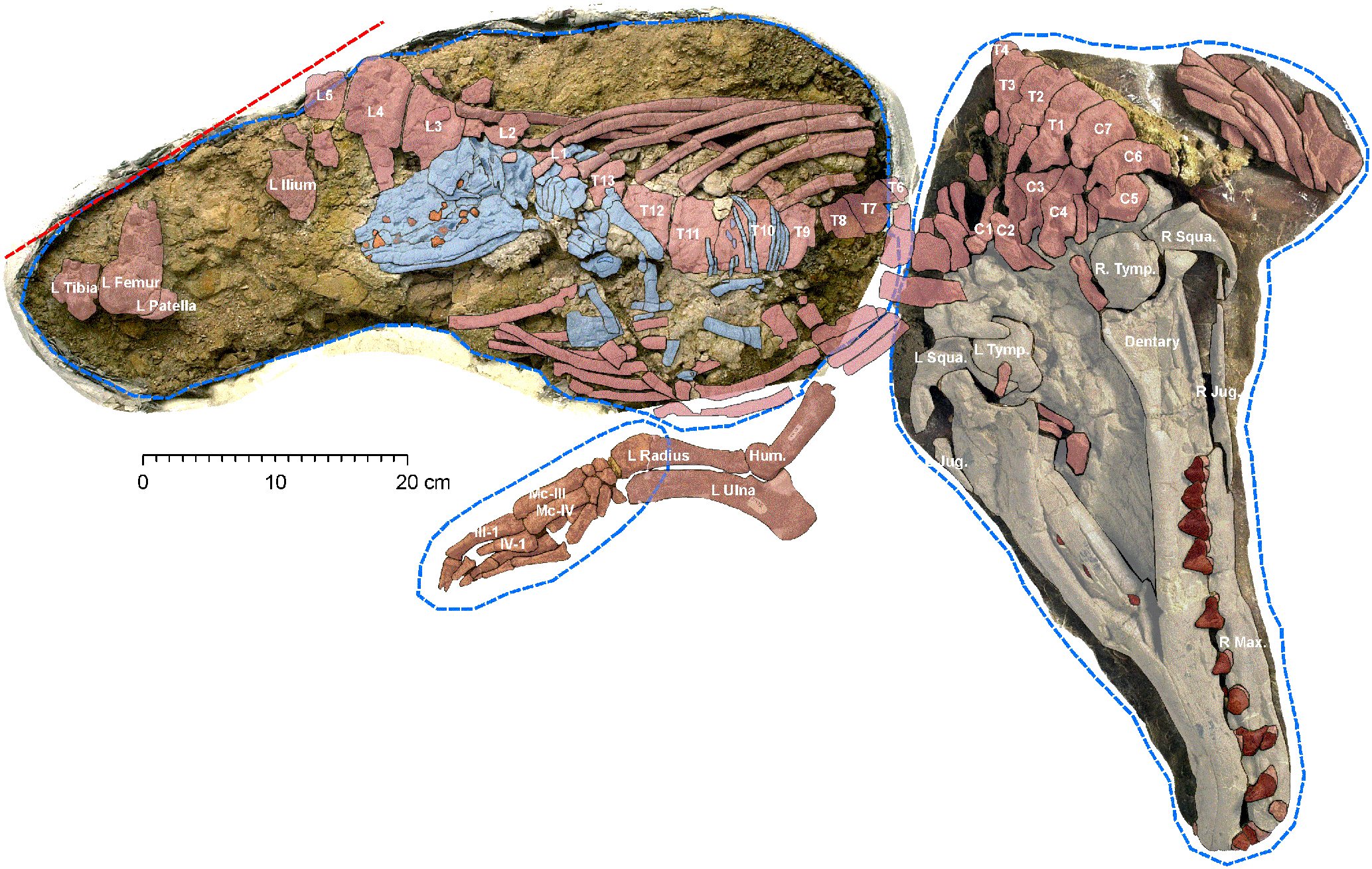
Fossil of a Maiacetus (red, beige skull) with fetus (blue, red teeth) shortly before the end of gestation

The fossil record traces the gradual transition from terrestrial to aquatic life. The regression of the hind limbs allowed greater flexibility of the spine. This made it possible for whales to move around with the vertical tail hitting the water. The front legs transformed into flippers, costing them their mobility on land.

One of the oldest members of ancient cetaceans (Archaeoceti) is Pakicetus from the Middle Eocene of Pakistan. This is an animal the size of a wolf, whose skeleton is known only partially. It had functioning legs and lived near the shore. This suggests the animal could still move on land. The long snout had carnivorous dentition.

The transition from land to sea dates to about 49 million years ago, with the Ambulocetus ("running whale"), also discovered in Pakistan. It was up to 3 m (9.8 ft) long. The limbs of this archaeocete were leg-like, but it was already fully aquatic, indicating that a switch to a lifestyle independent from land happened extraordinarily quickly. The snout was elongated with overhead nostrils and eyes. The tail was strong and supported movement through water. Ambulocetus probably lived in mangroves in brackish water and fed in the riparian zone as a predator of fish and other vertebrates.

Dating from about 45 million years ago are species such as Indocetus, Kutchicetus, Rodhocetus and Andrewsiphius, all of which were adapted to life in water. The hind limbs of these species were regressed and their body shapes resemble modern whales. Protocetidae family member Rodhocetus is considered the first to be fully aquatic. The body was streamlined and delicate with extended hand and foot bones. The merged pelvic lumbar spine was present, making it possible to support the floating movement of the tail. It was likely a good swimmer, but could probably move only clumsily on land, much like a modern seal.

==== Marine animals ====
Since the late Eocene, about 40 million years ago, cetaceans populated the subtropical oceans and no longer emerged on land. An example is the 18 metre long Basilosaurus, sometimes called Zeuglodon. The transition from land to water was completed in about 10 million years. The Wadi Al-Hitan ("Whale Valley") in Egypt contains numerous skeletons of Basilosaurus, as well as other marine vertebrates.

=== External phylogeny ===
Molecular biology, immunology, and fossils show that cetaceans are phylogenetically closely related with the even-toed ungulates (Artiodactyla). Whales' direct lineage began in the early Eocene, around 55.8 million years ago, with early artiodactyls. Most molecular biological evidence suggests that hippos are the closest living relatives. Common anatomical features include similarities in the morphology of the posterior molars, and the bony ring on the temporal bone (bulla) and the involucre, a skull feature that was previously associated only with cetaceans. Since the fossil record suggests that the morphologically distinct hippo lineage dates back only about 15 million years, Cetacea and hippos apparently diverged from a common ancestor that was morphologically distinct from either. The most striking common feature is the talus, a bone in the upper ankle. Early cetaceans, archaeocetes, show double castors, which occur only in even-toed ungulates. Corresponding findings are from Tethys Sea deposits in northern India and Pakistan. The Tethys Sea was a shallow sea between the Asian continent and northward-bound Indian plate.

Cetaceans evolved convergently as streamlined swimmers with fish and aquatic reptiles.

Molecular and morphological evidence suggests that artiodactyls as traditionally defined are paraphyletic with respect to cetaceans. Cetaceans are deeply nested within the artiodactyls; the two groups together form a clade, a natural group with a common ancestor, for which the name Cetartiodactyla is sometimes used. Modern nomenclature divides Artiodactyla (or Cetartiodactyla) into four subordinate taxa: camelids (Tylopoda), pigs and peccaries (Suina), ruminants (Ruminantia), and hippos plus whales (Whippomorpha). The Cetacea's presumed location within Artiodactyla can be represented in the following cladogram:

- Artiodactyla
  - Tylopoda (camels)
  - Artiofabula
    - Suina (pigs)
    - Cetruminantia
      - Ruminantia (ruminants)
        - Tragulidae (mouse deer)
        - Pecora (horn bearers)
      - Cetancodonta/Whippomorpha 54 mya
        - Hippopotamidae (hippopotamuses)
        - Cetacea (whales)

=== Internal phylogeny ===
Within Cetacea, the two parvorders are baleen whales (Mysticeti) which owe their name to their baleen, and toothed whales (Odontoceti), which have teeth shaped like cones, spades, pegs, or tusks, and can perceive their environment through biosonar.

Relationship of extinct and extant cetaceans:

- - Raoellidae †
  - Cetacea
    - Pakicetidae †
    - - Ambulocetidae †
      - - Remingtonocetidae †
        - - Rodhocetus †
          - - Dorudon †
            - - Basilosaurus †
              - - Mysticeti (baleen whales, 25 mya)
                  - Janjucetus †
                  - - Balaenidae
                      Right whales
                    - - Neobalaenidae
                        Pygmy right whale
                      - - Balaenopteridae
                          Rorquals
                        - Eschrichtiidae
                          Gray whales
                - Odontoceti (toothed whales)
                  - - Kogiidae
                      Dwarf sperm whales
                    - Physeteridae
                      Sperm whales
                  - - Platanistidae
                      South Asian river dolphins
                    - - Ziphiidae
                        Beaked whales
                      - - Inioidea (South American river dolphins)
                          - Lipotidae
                            Yangtze river dolphin
                          - - Iniidae
                            - Pontoporiidae
                        - Delphinoidea
                          - Delphinidae ("true" dolphins)
                            Oceanic dolphins
                          - - Monodontidae
                              Belugas & Narwhals
                            - Phocoenidae
                              Porpoises

† Extinct taxa

The terms whale and dolphin are informal:

- Mysticeti:

- Whales, with four families: Balaenidae (right and bowhead whales), Cetotheriidae (pygmy right whales), Balaenopteridae (rorquals), Eschrichtiidae (grey whales)

- Odontoceti:

- Whales: with four families: Monodontidae (belugas and narwhals), Physeteridae (sperm whales), Kogiidae (dwarf and pygmy sperm whales), and Ziphiidae (beaked whales)
- Dolphins, with five families: Delphinidae (oceanic dolphins), Platanistidae (South Asian river dolphins), Lipotidae (old world river dolphins), Iniidae (new world river dolphins), and Pontoporiidae (La Plata dolphins)
- Porpoises, with one family: Phocoenidae

The term 'great whales' covers those currently regulated by the International Whaling Commission: the Odontoceti families Physeteridae (sperm whales), Ziphiidae (beaked whales), and Kogiidae (pygmy and dwarf sperm whales); and Mysticeti families Balaenidae (right and bowhead whales), Cetotheriidae (pygmy right whales), Eschrichtiidae (grey whales), as well as part of the family Balaenopteridae (minke, Bryde's, sei, blue and fin; not Eden's and Omura's whales).

== Threats ==
The primary threats to cetaceans come from people, both directly from whaling or drive hunting and indirect threats from fishing and pollution.

=== Whaling ===
Methods of whaling

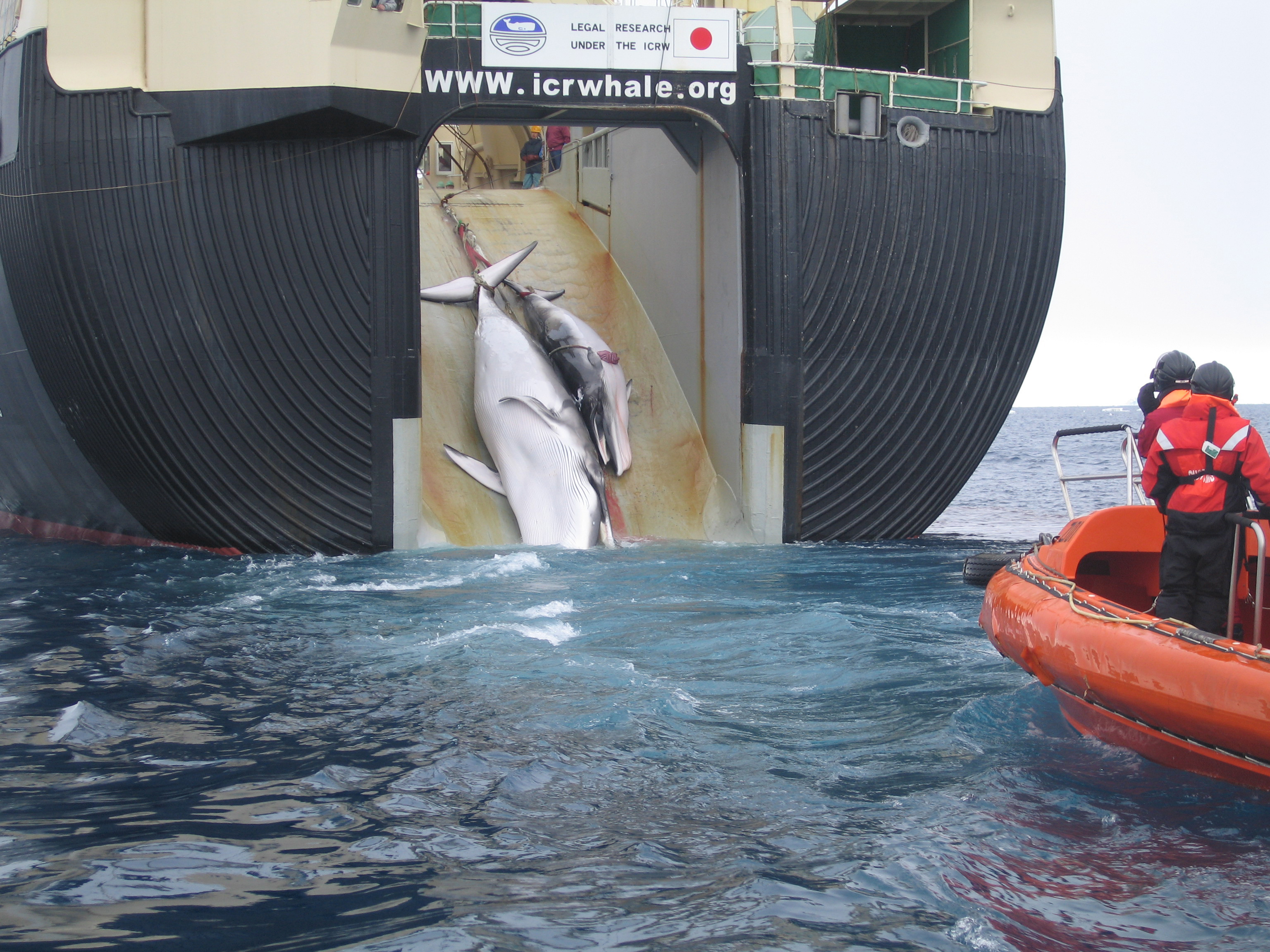
Japanese research ship whaling mother and calf minke whales.

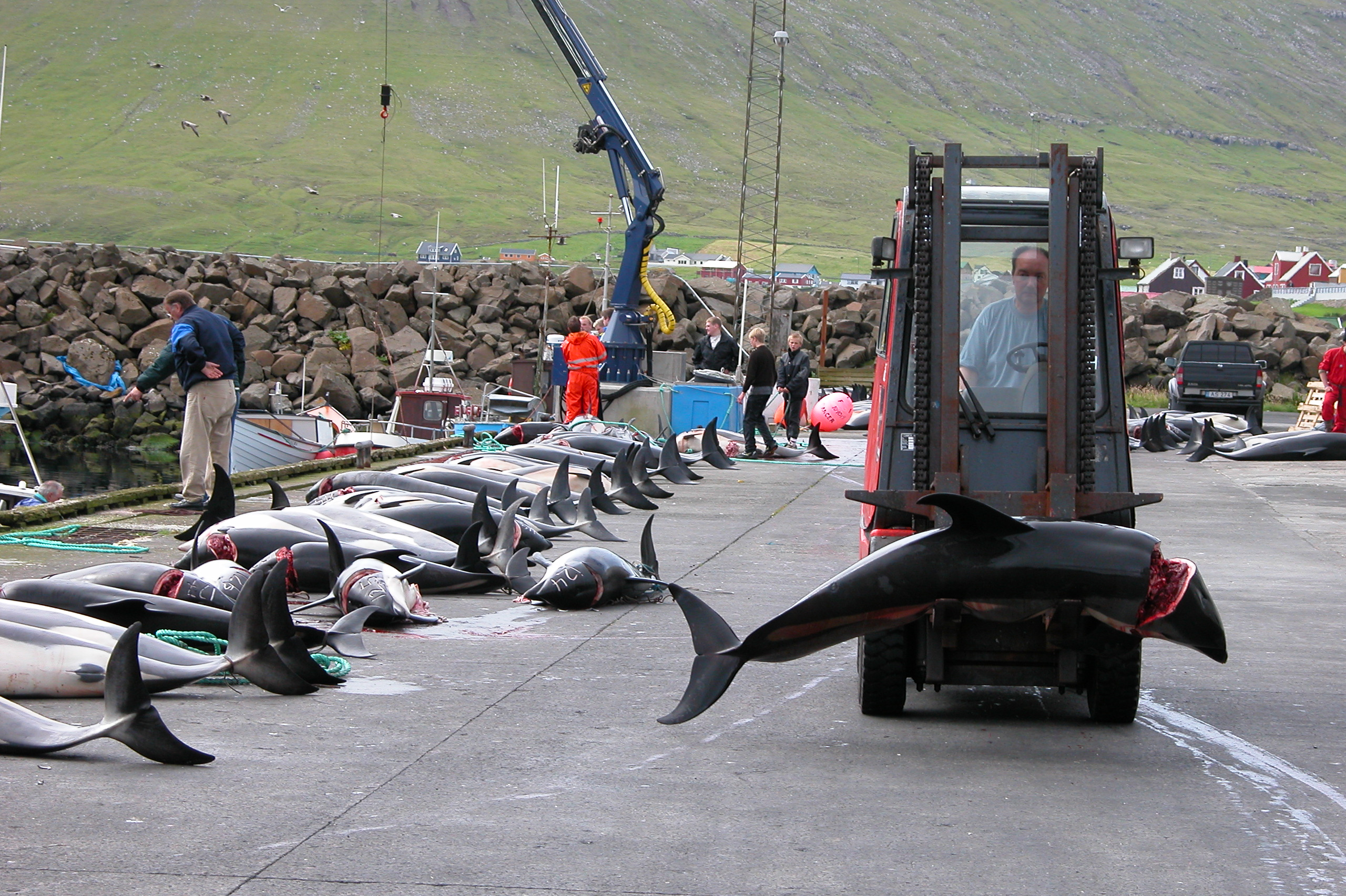
An Atlantic white-sided dolphin caught in a drive hunt in Hvalba on the Faroe Islands being taken away with a forklift.

Whaling is the practice of hunting whales, mainly baleen and sperm whales. This activity has gone on since the Stone Age.

In the Middle Ages, reasons for whaling included their meat, oil usable as fuel and the jawbone, which was used in house construction. At the end of the Middle Ages, early whaling fleets aimed at baleen whales, such as bowheads. In the 16th and 17th centuries, the Dutch fleet had about 300 whaling ships with 18,000 crewmen.

In the 18th and 19th centuries, baleen whales especially were hunted for their baleen, which was used as a replacement for wood, or in products requiring strength and flexibility such as corsets and crinoline skirts. In addition, the spermaceti found in the sperm whale was used as a machine lubricant and the ambergris as a material for pharmaceutical and perfume industries. In the second half of the 19th century, the explosive harpoon was invented, leading to a massive increase in the catch size.

Large ships were used as "mother" ships for the whale handlers. In the first half of the 20th century, whales were of great importance as a supplier of raw materials. Whales were intensively hunted during this time; in the 1930s, 30,000 whales were killed. This increased to over 40,000 animals per year up to the 1960s, when stocks of large baleen whales collapsed.

Most hunted whales are now threatened, with some great whale populations exploited to the brink of extinction. Atlantic and Korean gray whale populations were completely eradicated and the North Atlantic right whale population fell to some 300–600. The blue whale population is estimated to be around 14,000.

The first efforts to protect whales came in 1931. Some particularly endangered species, such as the humpback whale (which then numbered about 100 animals), were placed under international protection and the first protected areas were established. In 1946, the International Whaling Commission (IWC) was established, to monitor and secure whale stocks. Whaling of 14 large species for commercial purposes was prohibited worldwide by this organization from 1985 to 2005, though some countries do not honor the prohibition.

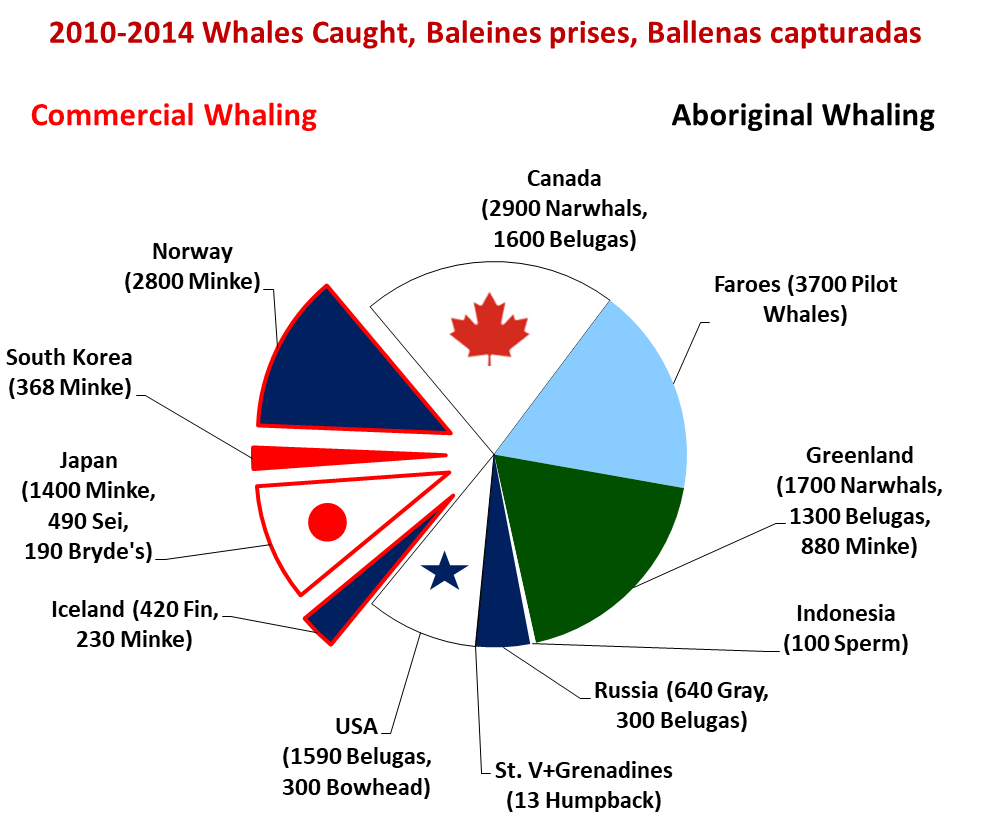
Whales caught 2010–2014, by country

The stocks of species such as humpback and blue whales have recovered, though they are still threatened. The United States Congress passed the Marine Mammal Protection Act of 1972 sustain the marine mammal population. It prohibits the taking of marine mammals except for several hundred per year taken in Alaska. Japanese whaling ships are allowed to hunt whales of different species for ostensibly scientific purposes.

Aboriginal whaling is still permitted. About 1,200 pilot whales were taken in the Faroe Islands in 2017, and about 900 narwhals and 800 belugas per year are taken in Alaska, Canada, Greenland, and Siberia. About 150 minke are taken in Greenland per year, 120 gray whales in Siberia and 50 bowheads in Alaska, as aboriginal whaling, besides the 600 minke taken commercially by Norway, 300 minke and 100 sei taken by Japan and up to 100 fin whales taken by Iceland. Iceland and Norway do not recognize the ban and operate commercial whaling. Norway and Japan are committed to ending the ban.

Dolphins and other smaller cetaceans are sometimes hunted in an activity known as dolphin drive hunting. This is accomplished by driving a pod together with boats, usually into a bay or onto a beach. Their escape is prevented by closing off the route to the ocean with other boats or nets. Dolphins are hunted this way in several places around the world, including the Solomon Islands, the Faroe Islands, Peru and Japan (the most well-known practitioner). Dolphins are mostly hunted for their meat, though some end up in dolphinaria. Despite the controversy thousands of dolphins are caught in drive hunts each year.

=== Fishing ===
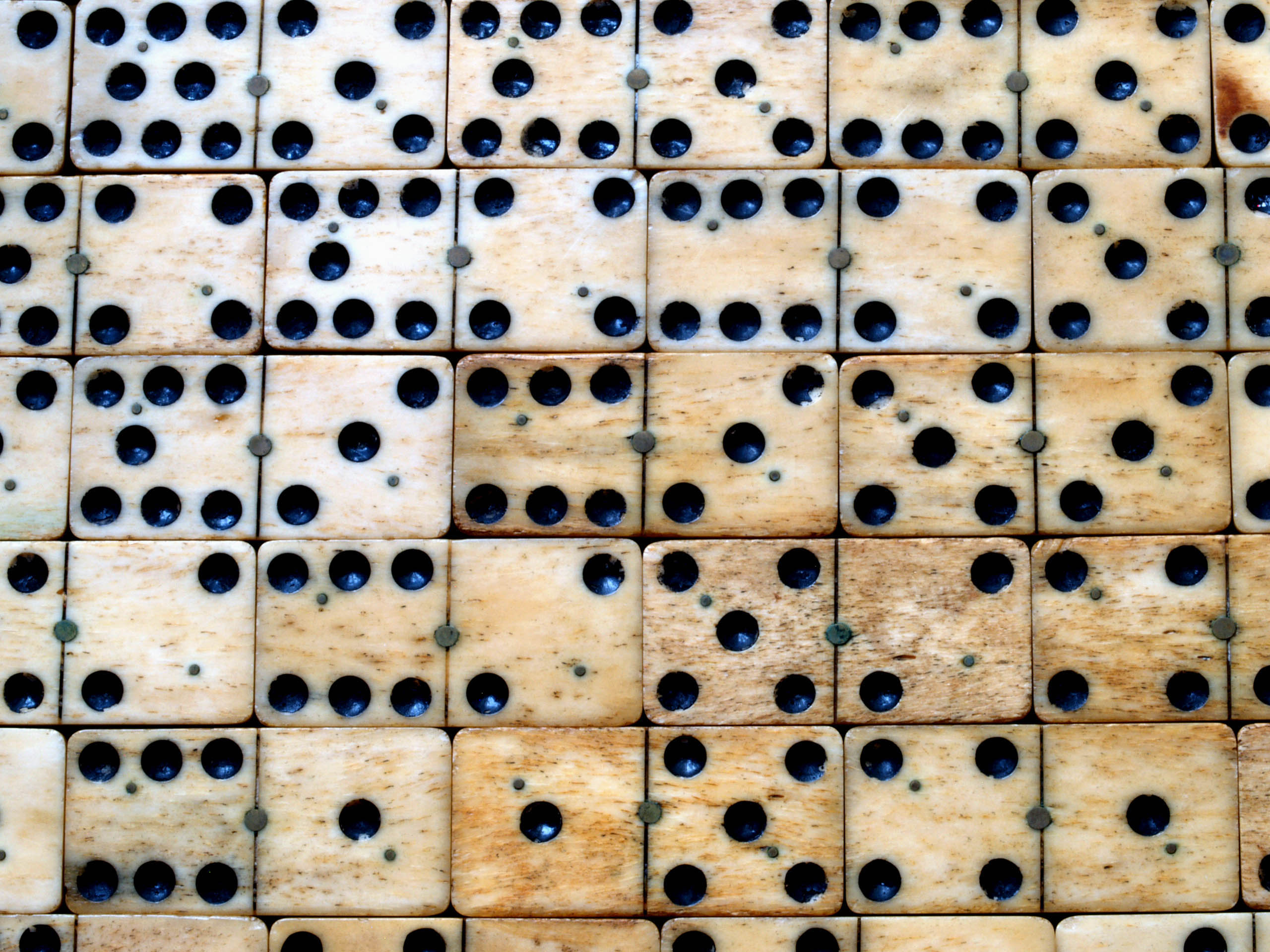
Dominoes made of baleen

Dolphin pods often reside near large tuna shoals. This is known to fishermen, who look for dolphins to catch tuna. Dolphins are much easier to spot from a distance than tuna, since they regularly breathe. The fishermen pull their nets hundreds of meters wide in a circle around the dolphin groups, in the expectation that they will net a tuna shoal. When the nets are pulled together, the dolphins become entangled under water and drown. Line fisheries in larger rivers are threats to river dolphins.

A greater threat than by-catch for small cetaceans is targeted hunting. In Southeast Asia, they are sold as fish-replacement to locals, since the region's edible fish promise higher revenues from exports. In the Mediterranean, small cetaceans are targeted to ease pressure on edible fish.

=== Strandings ===
A stranding is when a cetacean leaves the water to lie on a beach. In some cases, groups of whales strand together. The best known are mass strandings of pilot whales and sperm whales. Stranded cetaceans usually die, because their as much as 90 metric tons (99 short tons) body weight compresses their lungs or breaks their ribs. Smaller whales can die of heatstroke because of their thermal insulation.

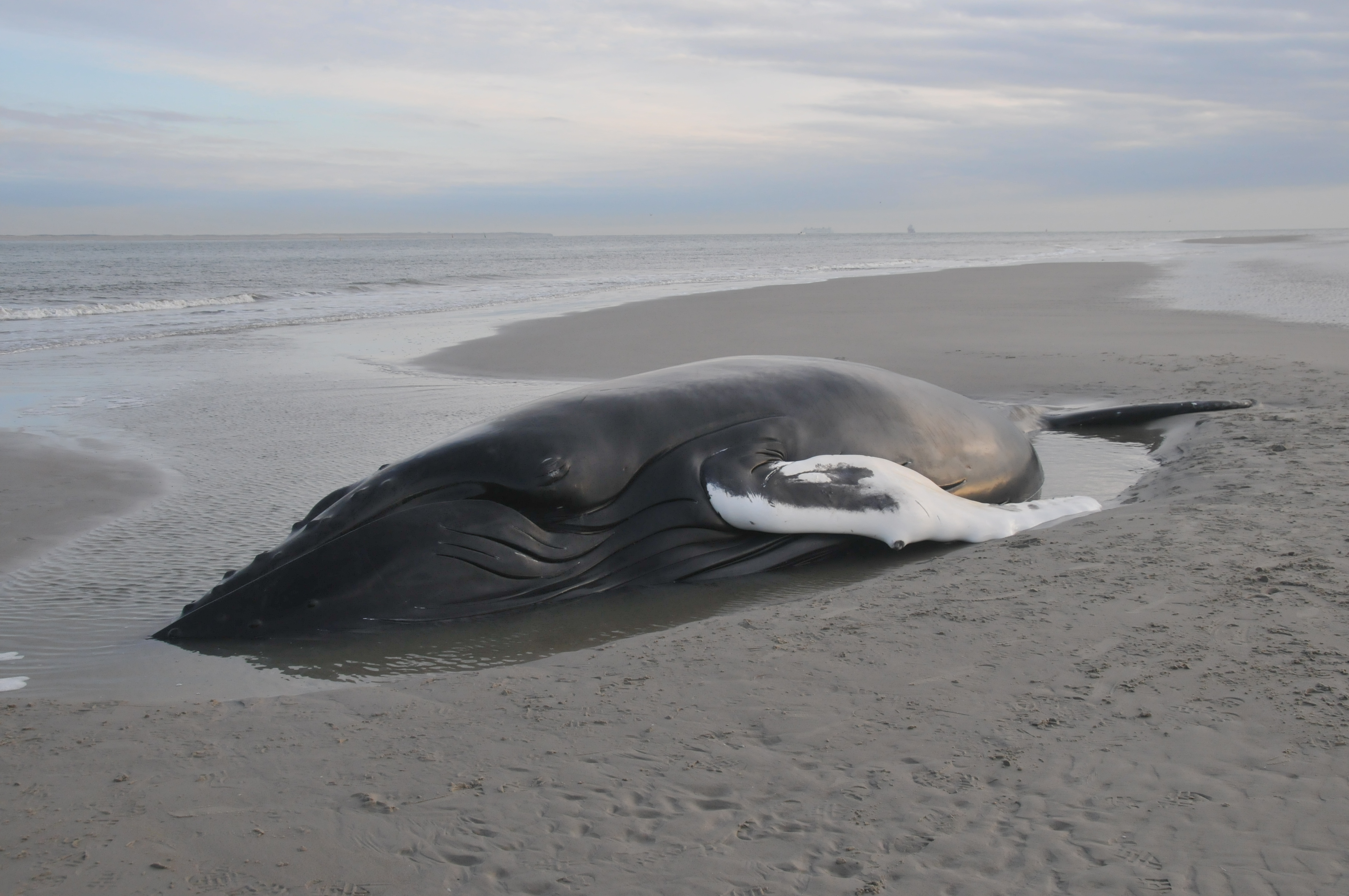
Beached humpback whale

The causes are not clear. Possible reasons for mass beachings are:

- toxic contaminants
- debilitating parasites (in the respiratory tract, brain or middle ear)
- infections (bacterial or viral)
- flight from predators (including humans)
- social bonds within a group, so that the pod follows a stranded animal
- disturbance of their magnetic senses by natural anomalies in the Earth's magnetic field
- injuries
- noise pollution by shipping traffic, seismic surveys and military sonar experiments

Since 2000, whale strandings frequently occurred following military sonar testing. In December 2001, the US Navy admitted partial responsibility for the beaching and the deaths of several marine mammals in March 2000. The coauthor of the interim report stated that animals killed by active sonar of some Navy ships were injured. Generally, underwater noise, which is still on the increase, is increasingly tied to strandings; because it impairs communication and sense of direction.

Climate change influences the major wind systems and ocean currents, which also lead to cetacean strandings. Researchers studying strandings on the Tasmanian coast from 1920 to 2002 found that greater strandings occurred at certain time intervals. Years with increased strandings were associated with severe storms, which initiated cold water flows close to the coast. In nutrient-rich, cold water, cetaceans expect large prey animals, so they follow the cold water currents into shallower waters, where the risk is higher for strandings. Whales and dolphins who live in pods may accompany sick or debilitated pod members into shallow water, stranding them at low tide.

=== Environmental hazards ===
Worldwide, use of active sonar has been linked to about 50 marine mammal strandings between 1996 and 2006. In all of these occurrences, there were other contributing factors, such as unusual (steep and complex) underwater geography, limited egress routes, and a specific species of marine mammal—beaked whales—that are suspected to be more sensitive to sound than other marine mammals.

— Rear Admiral Lawrence Rice

Heavy metals, residues of many plant and insect venoms and plastic waste flotsam are not biodegradable. Sometimes, cetaceans consume these hazardous materials, mistaking them for food items. As a result, the animals are more susceptible to disease and have fewer offspring.

Damage to the ozone layer reduces plankton reproduction because of its resulting radiation. This shrinks the food supply for many marine animals, but the filter-feeding baleen whales are most impacted. Even the Nekton is, in addition to intensive exploitation, damaged by the radiation.

Food supplies are also reduced long-term by ocean acidification due to increased absorption of increased atmospheric carbon dioxide. The CO_{2} reacts with water to form carbonic acid, which reduces the construction of the calcium carbonate skeletons of food supplies for zooplankton that baleen whales depend on.

The military and resource extraction industries operate strong sonar and blasting operations. Marine seismic surveys use loud, low-frequency sound that show what is lying underneath the Earth's surface. Vessel traffic also increases noise in the oceans. Such noise can disrupt cetacean behavior such as their use of biosonar for orientation and communication. Severe instances can panic them, driving them to the surface. This leads to bubbles in blood gases and can cause decompression sickness. Naval exercises with sonar regularly results in fallen cetaceans that wash up with fatal decompression. Sounds can be disruptive at distances of more than 100 kilometres (62 mi). Damage varies across frequency and species.

== Relationship to humans ==
=== Research history ===
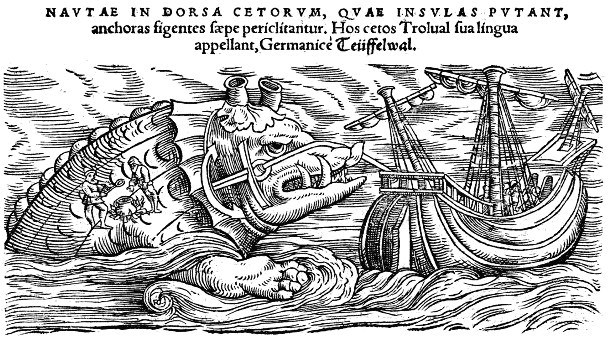
A whale as depicted by Conrad Gesner, 1587, in Historiae animalium

In Aristotle's time, the fourth century BCE, whales were regarded as fish due to their superficial similarity. Aristotle, however, observed many physiological and anatomical similarities with the terrestrial vertebrates, such as blood (circulation), lungs, uterus and fin anatomy. His detailed descriptions were assimilated by the Romans, but mixed with a more accurate knowledge of the dolphins, as mentioned by Pliny the Elder in his Natural history. In the art of this and subsequent periods, dolphins are portrayed with a high-arched head (typical of porpoises) and a long snout. The harbour porpoise was one of the most accessible species for early cetologists; because it could be seen close to land, inhabiting shallow coastal areas of Europe. Much of the findings that apply to all cetaceans were first discovered in porpoises. One of the first anatomical descriptions of the airways of a harbor porpoise dates from 1671 by John Ray. It nevertheless referred to the porpoise as a fish.

The tube in the head, through which this kind fish takes its breath and spitting water, located in front of the brain and ends outwardly in a simple hole, but inside it is divided by a downward bony septum, as if it were two nostrils; but underneath it opens up again in the mouth in a void.

— John Ray, 1671, the earliest description of cetacean airways

In the 10th edition of Systema Naturae (1758), Swedish biologist and taxonomist Carl Linnaeus asserted that cetaceans were mammals and not fish. His groundbreaking binomial system formed the basis of modern whale classification.

=== Culture ===
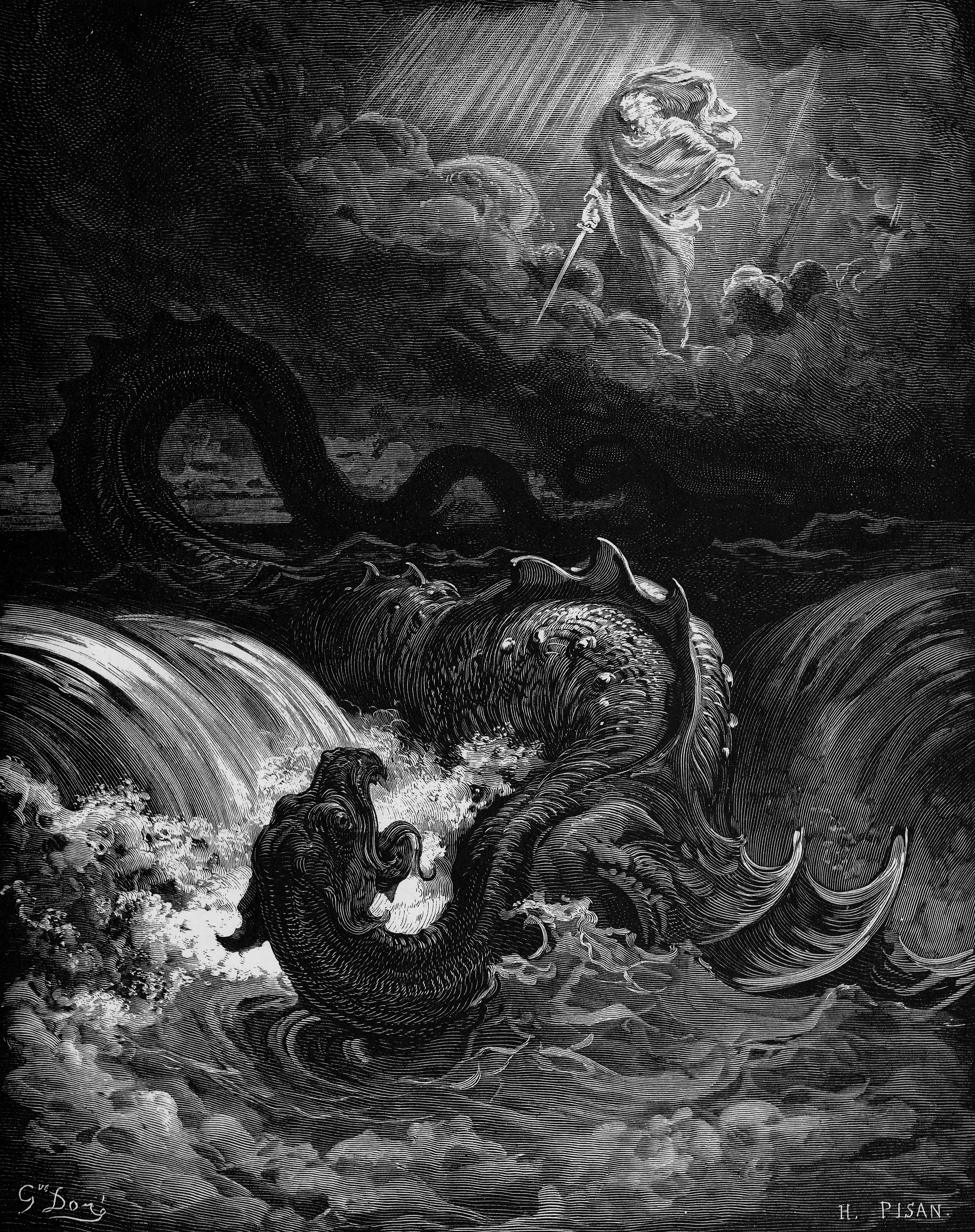
Destruction of Leviathan; engraving by Gustave Doré, 1865

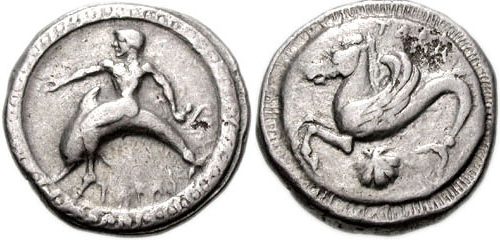
Silver coin with Taras riding a dolphin

Stone Age petroglyphs, such as those in Roddoy and Reppa (Norway), and the Bangudae Petroglyphs in South Korea, depict them. Whale bones were used for many purposes. In the Neolithic settlement of Skara Brae on Orkney sauce pans were made from whale vertebrae. The whale was first mentioned in ancient Greece by Homer. There, it is called Ketos, from which was derived the Roman word for whale, Cetus. In the Bible especially, the leviathan plays a role as a sea monster. The prophet Jonah, on his flight from the city of Nineveh, is swallowed by a whale. Dolphins are mentioned far more often than whales. Aristotle discusses the sacred animals of the Greeks in his Historia Animalium. The Greeks admired the dolphin as a "king of the aquatic animals" and referred to them erroneously as fish. Dolphins appear in Greek Mythology. Because of their intelligence, they rescued multiple people from drowning. They were said to love music, probably because of their own song, and in the legends they saved famous musicians, such as Arion of Lesbos from Methymna. Dolphins belong to the domain of Poseidon and led him to his wife Amphitrite. Dolphins are associated with other gods, such as Apollo, Dionysus and Aphrodite. The Greeks paid tribute to both whales and dolphins with their own constellation. The constellation of the Whale (Ketos, lat. Cetus) is located south of the Dolphin (Delphi, lat. Delphinus) north of the zodiac. Ancient art often included dolphin representations, including the Cretan Minoans. A particularly popular representation is that of Arion or Taras riding on a dolphin. In early Christian art, the dolphin is a popular motif, at times used as a symbol of Christ.

==== Middle Ages to the 19th century ====
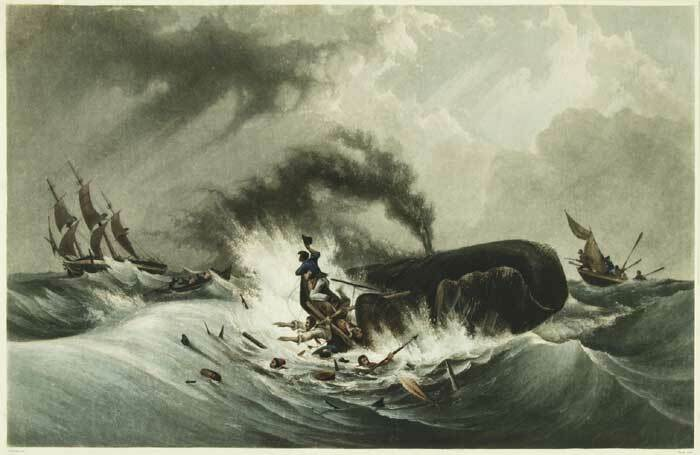
Depiction of baleen whaling, 1840

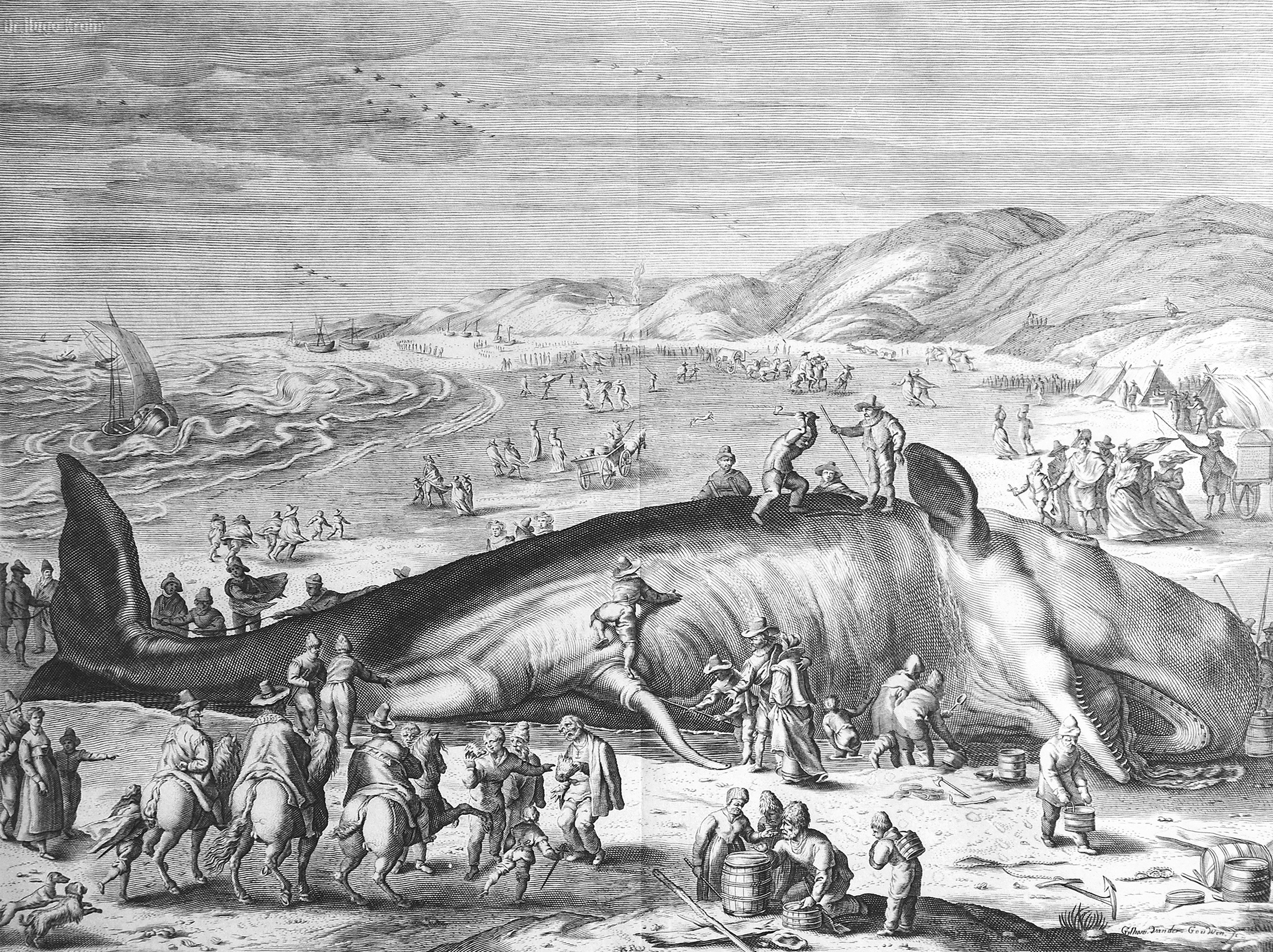
Stranded sperm whale engraving, 1598

St. Brendan described in his travel story Navigatio Sancti Brendani an encounter with a whale, between the years 565–573. Most descriptions of large whales from the Middle Ages until the whaling era, beginning in the 17th century, were of beached whales. Raymond Gilmore documented seventeen sperm whales in the estuary of the Elbe from 1723 to 1959 and thirty-one animals on the coast of Great Britain in 1784. In 1827, a blue whale beached itself off the coast of Ostend. Whales were used as attractions in museums and traveling exhibitions. Whalers from the 17th to 19th centuries depicted whales in drawings and recounted tales of their occupation. Although they knew that whales were harmless giants, they described battles with harpooned animals. These included descriptions of sea monsters, including huge whales, sharks, sea snakes, giant squid and octopuses. Among the first whalers who described their experiences on whaling trips was Captain William Scoresby from Great Britain, who published the book Northern Whale Fishery, describing the hunt for northern baleen whales. This was followed by Thomas Beale, a British surgeon, in his book Some observations on the natural history of the sperm whale in 1835; and Frederick Debell Bennett's The tale of a whale hunt in 1840. Whales were described in narrative literature and paintings, most famously in the novels Moby Dick by Herman Melville and Twenty Thousand Leagues Under the Seas by Jules Verne.

Baleen was used to make vessel components such as the bottom of a bucket in the Scottish National Museum. The Norsemen crafted ornamented plates from baleen. In the Canadian Arctic (east coast) in Punuk and Thule culture (1000–1600 C.E.), baleen was used to construct houses in place of wood as roof support for winter houses.

==== Modern culture ====
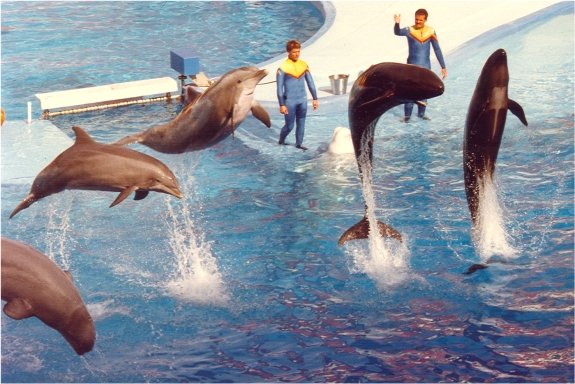
Sea World show featuring bottlenose dolphins and false killer whales

In the 20th century, perceptions of cetaceans changed. They transformed from monsters into creatures of wonder, as science revealed them to be intelligent and peaceful animals. Hunting was replaced by whale and dolphin tourism. This change is reflected in films and novels. For example, the protagonist of the series Flipper was a bottle-nose dolphin. The TV series SeaQuest DSV (1993–1996), the movies Free Willy and Star Trek IV: The Voyage Home, and the book series The Hitchhiker's Guide to the Galaxy by Douglas Adams are examples.

The study of whale songs also produced a popular album, Songs of the Humpback Whale.

=== Captivity ===
Whales and dolphins have been kept in captivity for use in education, research and entertainment since the 19th century.

==== Belugas ====
Beluga whales were the first whales to be kept in captivity. Other species were too rare, too shy or too big. The first was shown at Barnum's Museum in New York City in 1861. For most of the 20th century, Canada was the predominant source. They were taken from the St. Lawrence River estuary until the late 1960s, after which they were predominantly taken from the Churchill River estuary until capture was banned in 1992. Russia then became the largest provider. Belugas are caught in the Amur Darya delta and their eastern coast and are transported domestically to aquaria or dolphinaria in Moscow, St. Petersburg and Sochi, or exported to countries such as Canada. They have not been domesticated.

As of 2006, 30 belugas lived in Canada and 28 in the United States. 42 deaths in captivity had been reported. A single specimen can reportedly fetch up to US$100,000 (£64,160). The beluga's popularity is due to its unique color and its facial expressions. The latter is possible because while most cetacean "smiles" are fixed, the extra movement afforded by the beluga's unfused cervical vertebrae allows a greater range of apparent expression.

==== Orcas ====
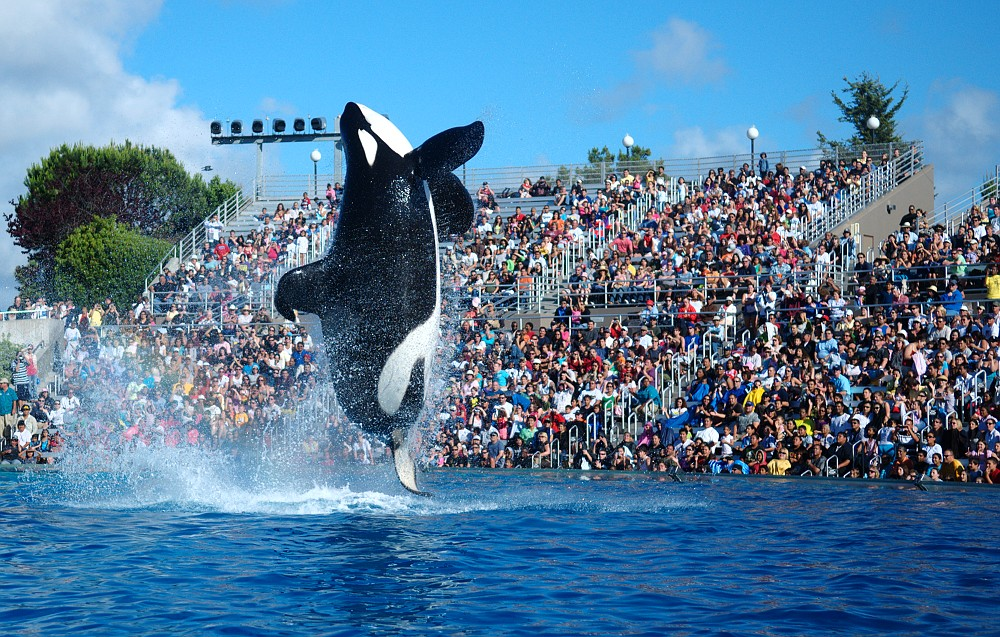
Ulises the orca, 2009

The orca's intelligence, trainability, striking appearance, playfulness in captivity and sheer size have made it a popular exhibit at aquaria and aquatic theme parks. From 1976 to 1997, fifty-five whales were taken from the wild in Iceland, nineteen from Japan and three from Argentina. These figures exclude animals that died during capture. Live captures fell dramatically in the 1990s and by 1999, about 40% of the forty-eight animals on display in the world were captive-born.

Organizations such as World Animal Protection and the Whale and Dolphin Conservation campaign against the practice of keeping them in captivity.

In captivity, they often develop pathologies, such as the dorsal fin collapse seen in 60–90% of captive males. Captives have reduced life expectancy, on average only living into their 20s, although some live longer, including several over 30 years old and two, Corky II and Lolita, in their mid-40s. In the wild, females who survive infancy live 46 years on average and up to 70–80 years. Wild males who survive infancy live 31 years on average and can reach 50–60 years.

Captivity usually bears little resemblance to wild habitat and captive whales' social groups are foreign to those found in the wild. Critics claim captive life is stressful due to these factors and the requirement to perform circus tricks that are not part of wild orca behavior. Wild orca may travel up to 160 kilometres (100 mi) in a day and critics say the animals are too big and intelligent to be suitable for captivity. Captives occasionally act aggressively towards themselves, their tankmates, or humans, which critics say is a result of stress. Orcas are well known for their performances in shows, but the number of orcas kept in captivity is small, especially when compared to the number of bottlenose dolphins, with only forty-four captive orcas being held in aquaria as of 2012.

Each country has its own tank requirements; in the US, the minimum enclosure size is set by the Code of Federal Regulations, 9 CFR E § 3.104, under the Specifications for the Humane Handling, Care, Treatment and Transportation of Marine Mammals.

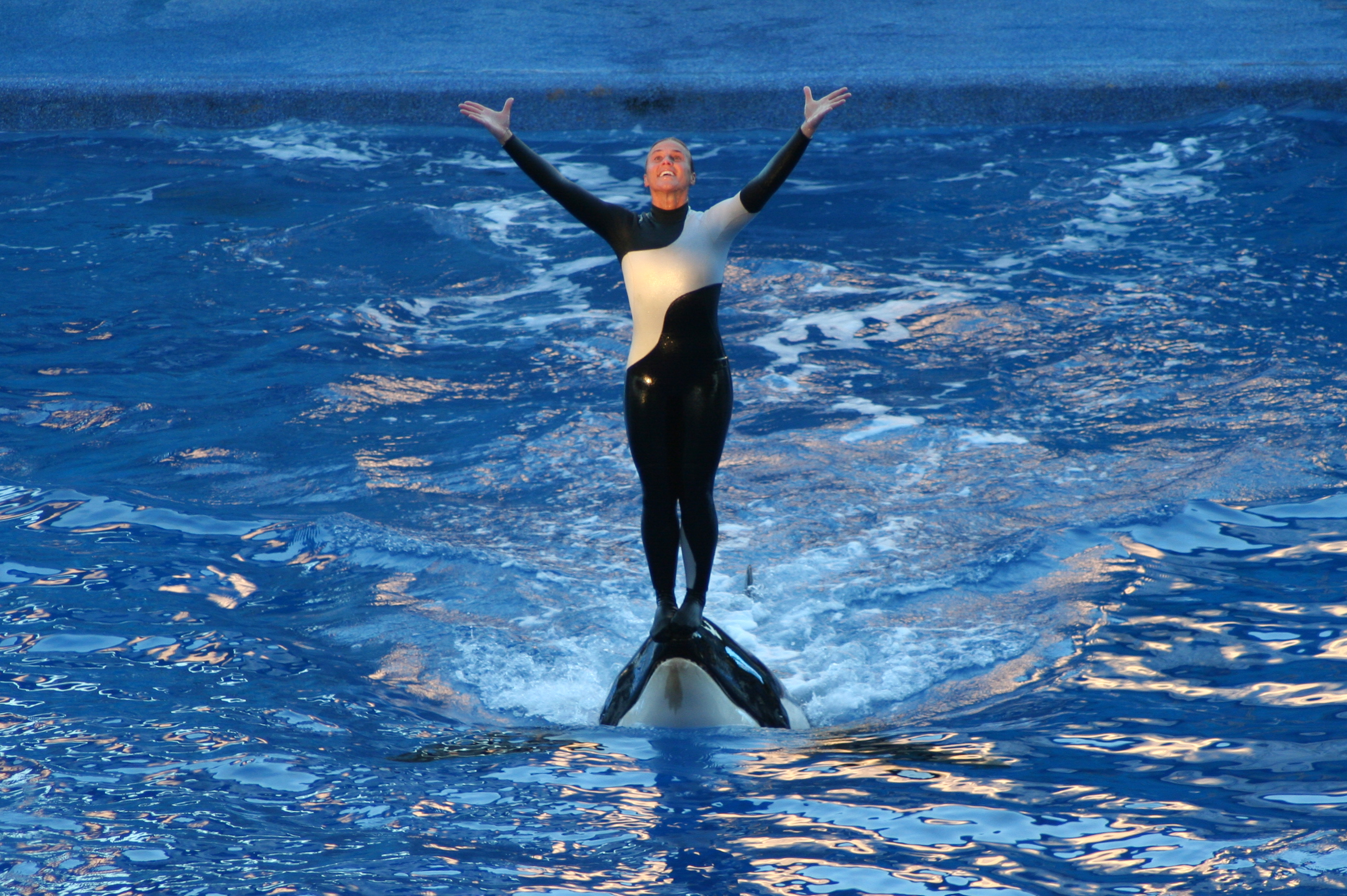
Dawn Brancheau doing a show four years before the incident

Aggression among captive orcas is common. They attack each other and their trainers as well. In 2013, SeaWorld's treatment of orcas in captivity was the basis of the movie Blackfish, which documents the history of Tilikum, an orca at SeaWorld Orlando, who had been involved in the deaths of three people. The film led to proposals by some lawmakers to ban captivity of cetaceans, and led SeaWorld to announce in 2016 that it would phase out its orca program.

==== Others ====
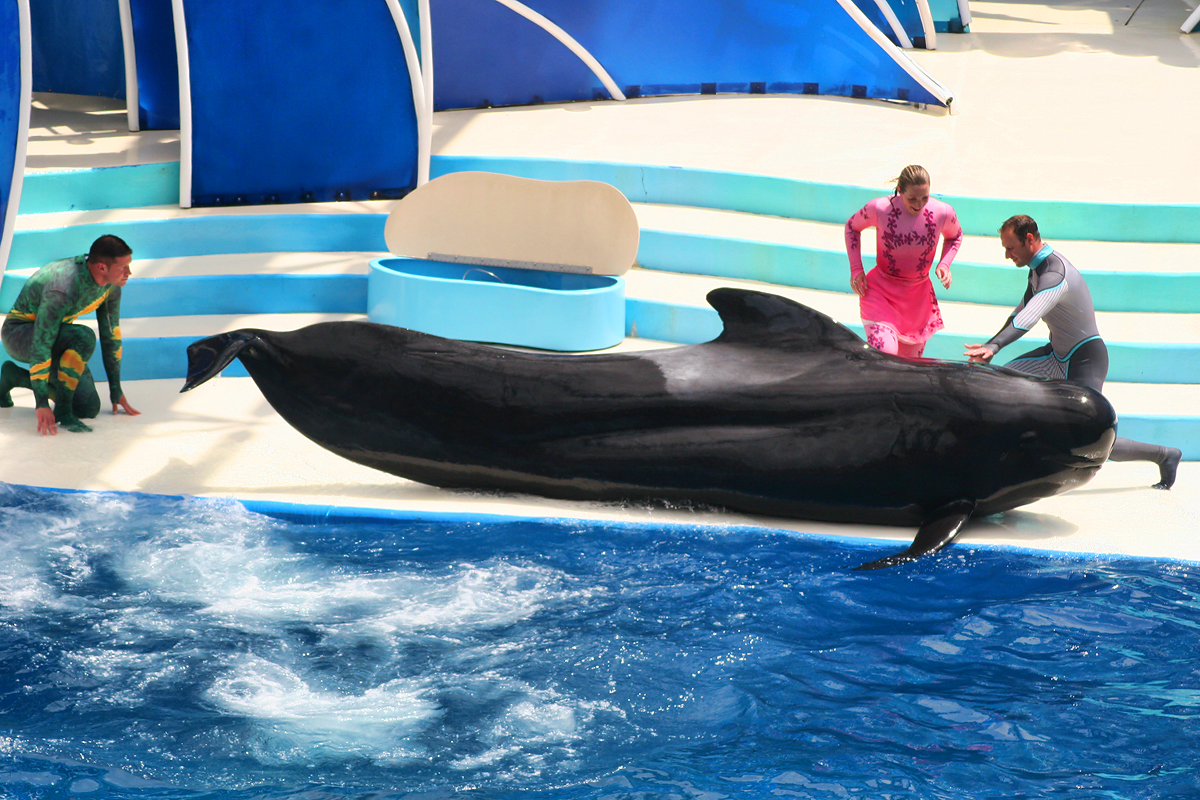
SeaWorld pilot whale with trainers

Dolphins and porpoises are kept in captivity. Bottlenose dolphins are the most common, as they are relatively easy to train, have a long lifespan in captivity and have a friendly appearance. Bottlenose dolphins live in captivity across the world, though exact numbers are hard to determine. Other species kept in captivity are spotted dolphins, false killer whales and common dolphins, Commerson's dolphins, as well as rough-toothed dolphins, but all in much lower numbers. There are also fewer than ten pilot whales, Amazon river dolphins, Risso's dolphins, spinner dolphins, or tucuxi in captivity. Two unusual and rare hybrid dolphins, known as wolphins, are kept at Sea Life Park in Hawaii, which is a cross between a bottlenose dolphin and a false killer whale. Also, two common/bottlenose hybrids reside in captivity at Discovery Cove and SeaWorld San Diego.

In repeated attempts in the 1960s and 1970s, narwhals kept in captivity died within months. A breeding pair of pygmy right whales were retained in a netted area. They were eventually released in South Africa. In 1971, SeaWorld captured a California gray whale calf in Mexico at Scammon's Lagoon. The calf, later named Gigi, was separated from her mother using a form of lasso attached to her flukes. Gigi was displayed at SeaWorld San Diego for a year. She was then released with a radio beacon affixed to her back; however, contact was lost after three weeks. Gigi was the first captive baleen whale. JJ, another gray whale calf, was kept at SeaWorld San Diego. JJ was an orphaned calf that beached itself in April 1997 and was transported two miles to SeaWorld. The 680 kilograms (1,500 lb) calf was a popular attraction and behaved normally, despite separation from her mother. A year later, the then 8,164.7 kilograms (18,000 lb) whale though smaller than average, was too big to keep in captivity, and was released on April 1, 1998. A captive Amazon river dolphin housed at Acuario de Valencia is the only trained river dolphin in captivity.
