= Daras (surname) =

Daras is a surname. Notable people with the surname include:

- Bogdan Daras (1960–2025), Polish sport wrestler
- Dimitrios Daras (born 1956), Greek footballer
- José Daras (born 1948), Belgian politician

== See also ==
- Dara
- Taras (surname)
