= Tarasis =

Tarasis may refer to:

- Birth name of Zeno (emperor)
- Konstantinos Tarasis (born 1957), Greek footballer

== See also ==
- Taras (disambiguation)
