= Satyrion =

In Greek mythology, Satyrion or Satyria was a nymph perhaps from the region of Taranto, Italy. Her union with the god Poseidon produced Taras, eponymous founder of Taras.

== Other use ==
- Satyrions is a former name for orchids from their connection to satyrs. (see Orchis)
- Satyrion is also a name for ragwort and ancient aphrodisiac made from it. Though it may have been named after the nymph, it more likely derives from the mythical and lustful satyrs. This aphrodisiac is mentioned twice in the Satyricon of Petronius.
- Satyrion (Ancient Greek: Σατύριον), the ancient name of Saturo at Italy near the Taranto.
