= Taras (surname) =

Taras is a surname. Notable people with the surname include:

- Connor Taras (born 19??), Canadian kayaker
- Jamie Taras (born 1966), Canadian football player
- John Taras (1919–2004), American ballet master and choreographer
- Martin Taras (1914–1994), American cartoonist
- Raymond Taras (born 1946), Canadian political scientist
