= Taras (mythology) =

Son of Poseidon in Greek mythology

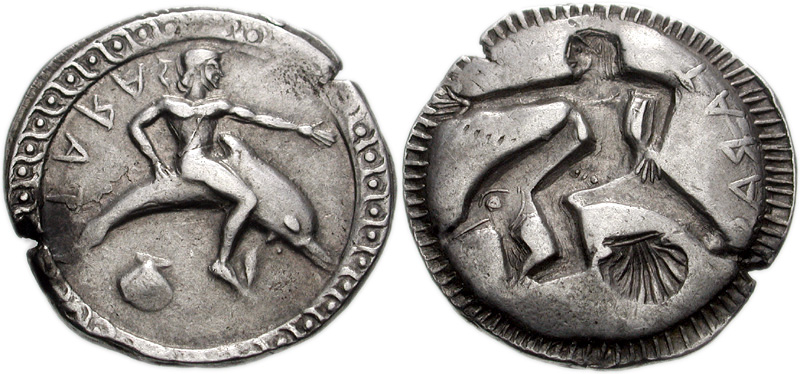
A silver coin of Taranto representing Taras.

In Greek mythology, Taras (Ancient Greek: Τάρας) was the eponymous founder of the Greek colony of Taras (Tarentum, modern Taranto), in Magna Graecia (today Southern Italy).

== Family ==
Taras was the son of Poseidon and Satyrion, either a Tarentine nymph or a daughter of Minos.

== Mythology ==
When Taras was shipwrecked, his father rescued him by sending a dolphin which he rode to traverse the sea from the promontory of Taenarum to the south of Italy. Brought ashore, Taras founded Tarentum which was named in his honour. According to Pausanias, he was worshiped as a hero who named both the city and the river, Taras after himself.

== Taranto ==
Note that a harbour close by Taranto is still called Torre Saturo (derived from Satyrion). It was in Torre Saturo, almost 15 km (9.3 mi) south of Taranto, that Spartan colonists settled their first colony in Taranto zone. Later, around 706 BC, they conquered the Iapygian city of Taranto. On the coinage of the ancient city of Taras, the son of Poseidon is depicted on a dolphin, sometimes with his father's trident in one hand; the same image is depicted on the modern city emblem.

== See also ==
- Arion – another dolphin-riding young man. Saved by dolphins after being captured by pirates whilst returning from Taranto, Taras's city.
- Melicertes – the son of Ino and king Athamas of Boeotia. Ino and Melicertes threw themselves off of a large rock at the Isthmus of Corinth. They were then deified as Palaemon (Melicertes) and Leucothea (Ino). As Palaemon, Melicertes is often depicted mounted on a dolphin.
- Amphitrite – the queen of the sea, carried to Poseidon, her future husband, by Delphinus, after hiding from the god at the Atlas mountains.
- Dionysus – a similar story to Arion's ends with Dionysus turning a crew of pirate kidnappers into dolphins, save for one helmsman, who had tried to help Dionysus.
- Apollo – the god came to the site of Delphi, then known as Krisa or Pytho (due to the Python who lived there), shaped like a dolphin, carrying Cretan priests, whom he rescued from a shipwreck, on his back. The site would be named Delphi to commemorate this event and Apollo would bear the epithet Delphinios.
