= Castle of Barletta =

Castle in Barletta, Italy

- Castello di Barletta
- Apulia, Barletta in Italy
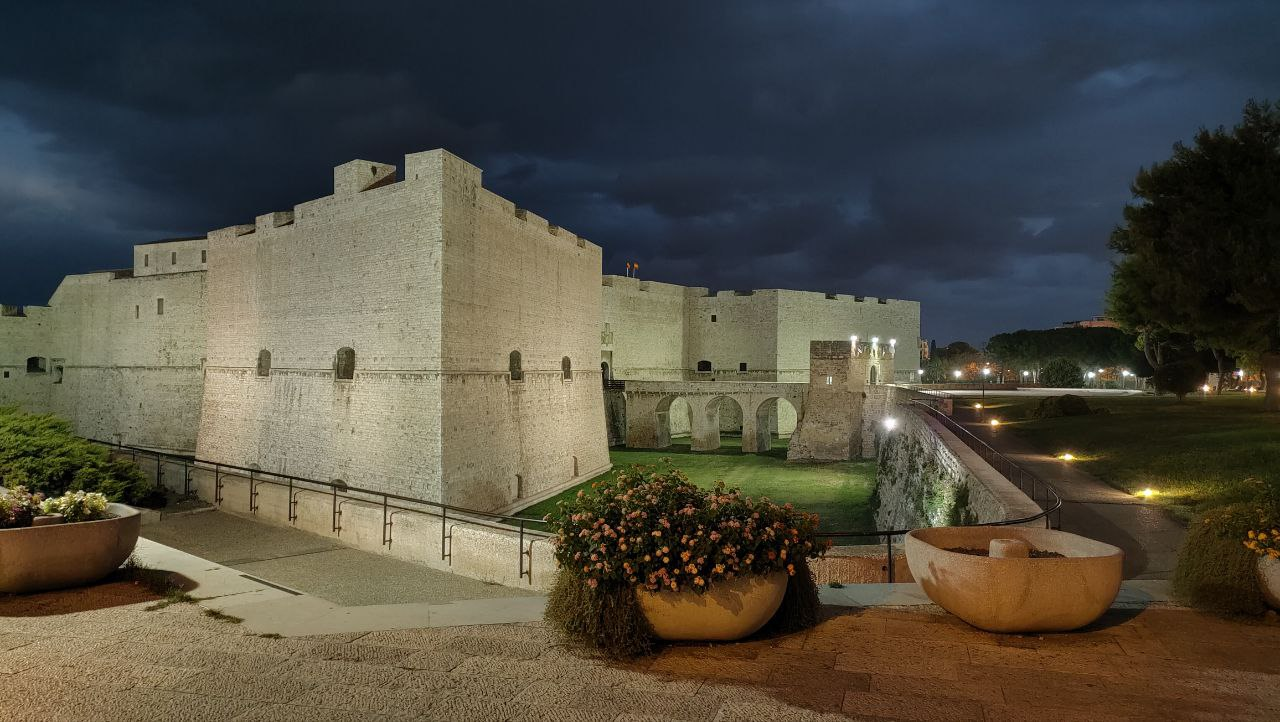
- The castle of Barletta in a night view

Site information
- Type: Medieval-Renaissance castle
- Owner: Municipality of Barletta
- Open to the public: Yes, through guided tours except on Mondays
- Condition: Restored between 1973 and 1988
- Website: http://www.comune.barletta.bt.it/retecivica/citta/luoghi/castello/castello.html

Location
- Coordinates: 41.320833°N 16.288333°E

Site history
- Built: 11th century-17th century
- Events: 1915: the castle came under attack by the Austrian scout cruiser Helgoland.

Garrison information
- Past commanders: William I of Sicily; Frederick II, Holy Roman Emperor; Charles I of Anjou; Charles V, Holy Roman Emperor; Philip IV of Spain
- Garrison: Home of the Municipal Museum and the Municipal Library

The castle of Barletta is the architectural result of various stratifications due to the succession of different ruling dynasties from the 11th century to the 18th century. Once a fortress for defensive purposes, surrounded by the sea that occupied the moat all around the castle and insulated it from potential enemy attacks, it constitutes a strategic point in city life as well as an important urban core. It is home to the Municipal Library, the Civic Museum and a conference and exhibition hall.

Among the works preserved, in addition to an alleged limestone bust of Frederick II of Swabia, dating back to the 13th century, the Sarcophagus of the Apostles, the first stone high relief to bear witness to Christianity in Barletta, dating from the period between the 3rd and 4th centuries, is located here.

== History ==
=== Norman period (1046 - 1194) ===
Hypotheses on the origin of the first nucleus of the present castle attest to its origins between 1046 and 1050 by the Normans and are based on the custom, typical of this people, of fortifying the lands close to those to be conquered by providing them with towers, in view of the subsequent occupation of the neighboring territory. For this reason Count Peter the Norman in view of a later attack on the city of Trani, held strenuously until 1054, under Byzantine rule, took possession of the undefended lands of Barletta, erecting a fortress for defensive purposes in the southeastern area of the present building. In those same years he had the first town wall built, within which the settlement was divided into the two nuclei of Santa Maria, near the castle and the ancient mother church, and San Giacomo, to the west around the church of the same name.

The handover between the Norman count and his son Peter II, which took place in 1067, and the ensuing wars of succession to power involving the Hauteville family of Sicily, made Apulia an open field of war, and brought the territory of Barletta under the power of William I of Sicily, who succeeded his father in 1154, his elder brothers having died. Following the destruction of Bari, William, between 1156 and 1162, enlarged the castle's edifice, building two more towers, connected by a simple wall, to which a fourth was later added on the southwestern side, thus constituting a pseudo-trapezoidal layout fortress. (Note: In a royal document dated July 7, 1278, in Lagopesole, Charles I mentions the collapse of the wall and the ancient tower on the side of the church of Santa Maria where the expression "ancient tower" refers to that of Norman origin, as the Swabian period is chronologically too close to the time of transcription.) In 1172 William II, son of William I, on his return from Taranto and on his way on pilgrimage to the sanctuary of Monte Sant'Angelo, stayed in the castle of Barletta, making substantial donations in favor of the Barletta clergy.

Of the Norman period, which ended with the death of Tancred, cousin of William II, in 1194, only the southeast tower of the castle remained, severed in height and incorporated during the 16th-century interventions in the southern curtain of the Spanish structure. The profound restoration of the castle that took place in the 1980s, given the direct inaccessibility of the tower, allowed its internal visibility through the recovery of a hole on the ground floor protected by a metal grating.

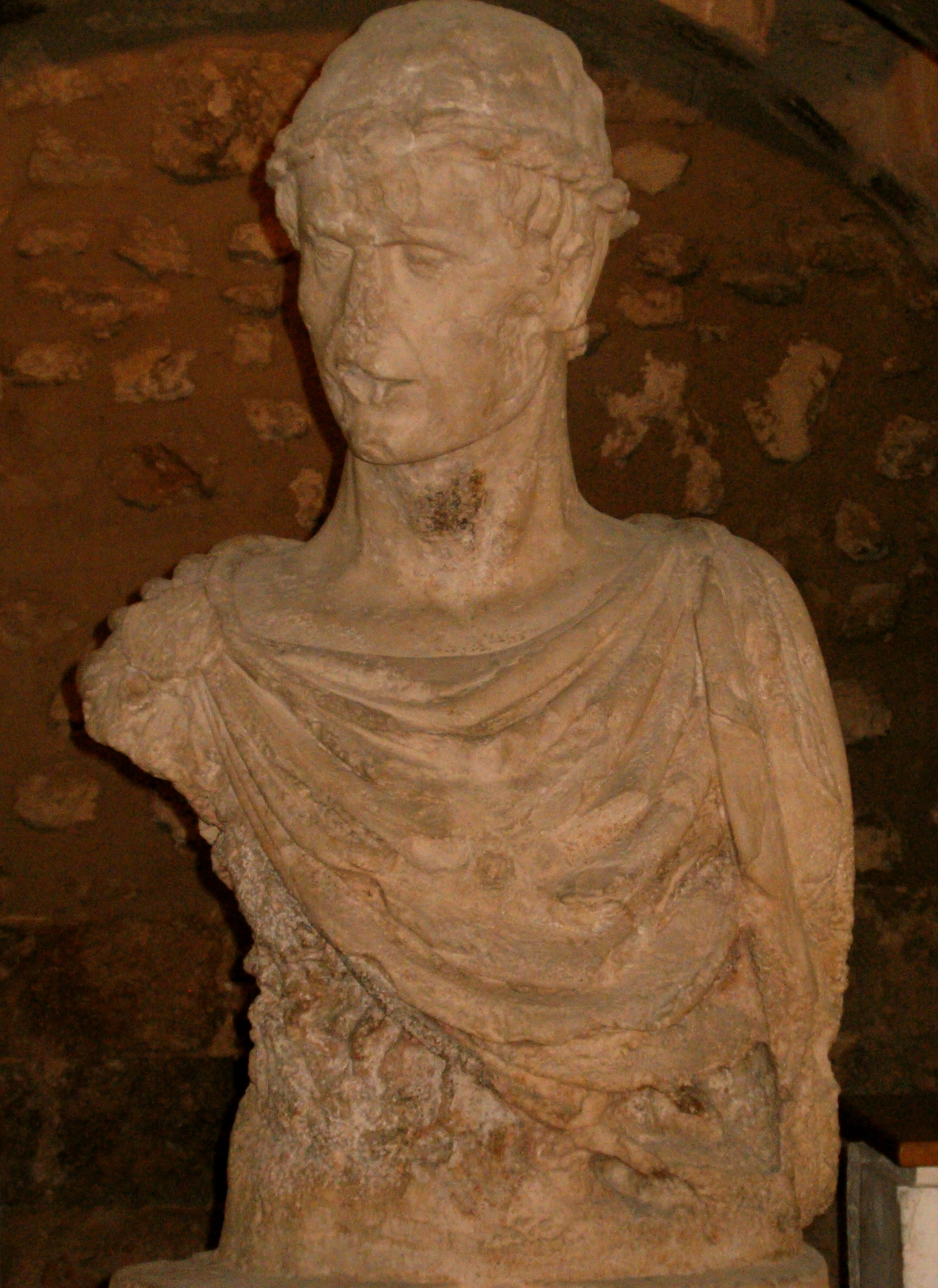
Alleged bust of Frederick II preserved inside the castle.

=== Swabian Period (1194 - 1266) ===
In 1194 Frederick of Swabia, son of the King of Sicily and Holy Roman Emperor Henry VI and Constance of Hauteville, was born. After Henry's death in 1197, and Constance's in 1198, Frederick was brought under the guardianship of Pope Innocent III. This event led to extensive involvement of the church in royal affairs and makes it possible to trace the first historical record in which explicit reference is made to the castle of Barletta, in some letters of Innocent III in 1202.

In 1202 the dispute for dominion over the Kingdom of Sicily flared up, pitting the Germans led by Markward von Annweiler and Dipold of Acerra against the French of Walter III of Brienne. Dipold and Markward demanded guardianship over the infant Frederick II, entrusted instead by his mother Constance to Pope Innocent III; the pontiff then appointed Walter III Prince of Taranto, Duke of Apulia and Count of Lecce and chose him as his own champion to restore control over the Kingdom of Sicily. Letters from the pontiff, sent to Walter between July 21 and September 24, 1202, testify for the first time to the neuralgic role assumed by the castle in those years along the Adriatic coast. On October 6 of the same year, near Cannae, Walter had to repel first an assault by Dipold's troops and later, after occupying Barletta and its castle, the siege of William of Palearia's troops. During the following year, after the groundless news of Innocent III's death had spread, the people of Barletta tried to take advantage of the event by besieging and driving out the pro-papal castellan who had occupied the fortress on behalf of Jacopo of the Counts of Segni in the hope of regaining the structure, though causing damage to the wall structure.

Frederick's growth continued in parallel with that of the Barletta castle, in which the emperor resided on several occasions beginning in 1228. After being crowned in 1215 king of the Romans and Germany in Mainz and in 1220 consecrated emperor by Pope Honorius III, Frederick II banished the Sixth Crusade from Barletta in 1228 and in the following year, on his return from the Holy Land, stayed in the city for two months. Before 1224, the year in which the construction of the Frederician wing of the castle was promoted, the only historical document in which Barletta appears again dates from 1205 and in it the sovereign authorized the church of St. James to build a mill, a tavern and an oven. In that year, the castle complex was irregular and asymmetrical, far from the usual construction of Frederick's forts. (Note: For a comparison of Frederick's buildings, it is useful to consult Castel del Monte in Andria, Castello Ursino in Catania, and Castello Maniace in Syracuse.) For this reason, between 1224 and 1228, the sovereign intervened by demolishing the eastern area that had belonged to the Normans and building there the Frederician domus, accentuating the decorative and architectural aspects of the castle and transforming what had previously been a fortress for defensive purposes into a palace for his court. In 1228 Frederick visited Barletta and from there, after assembling the parliament of barons in the castle, announced his departure for the Sixth Crusade during a diet held in the domus itself.

On Frederick's death in 1250 he was succeeded by his son Conrad. On May 21, 1254, with the departure of Conrad, who died in Lavello of malaria, his son Conradin, only two years old, became heir to the kingdom, whose guardianship was assumed by Manfred of Sicily, natural son of Frederick II and half-brother of Conrad. Fourteen years later, following the battle of Tagliacozzo between the Angevin troops of Charles I and the Ghibelline supporters of Conradin of Swabia, the latter was first taken prisoner and then beheaded. Thus ended the Swabian dynasty in favor of the Angevin dynasty, with the figure of Charles I of Anjou simultaneously taking over possession of Barletta and its castle.

=== Angevin period (1266 - 1442) ===
The importance of Barletta and its castle on the one hand, and the rancor that Charles I of Anjou felt for the Swabians on the other, induced him to intervene architecturally on the entire fortress, as well as on the urban enclosure, starting in 1268. In this regard, the considerable documentation found shows the gradual transition from the intention to proceed with ordinary maintenance to the substantial modifications of the masonry work, which included the construction of the Angevin palatium on the north side, which disappeared following the subsequent Spanish extension and whose foundations, following restoration in the 1980s, were used as a water cistern, the replacement of the collapsed Norman antique tower to the southeast with a circular tower, (Note: For a comparison of the structures, it is useful to consult the Lucera Castle for similarities between the two structures, designed by the same architect, Pierre d'Angicourt.) the excavation of a moat around the castle with the building of an outer defense wall to the west, also called talutum, (Note: The term talutum, from the French word taluter meaning scarp, corresponds to a scarp wall of considerable size. Grisotti, p. 42.) the reinforcement of the existing curtain walls and the building of an additional gateway to the castle named Porta Trani, facing east toward the city of the same name.

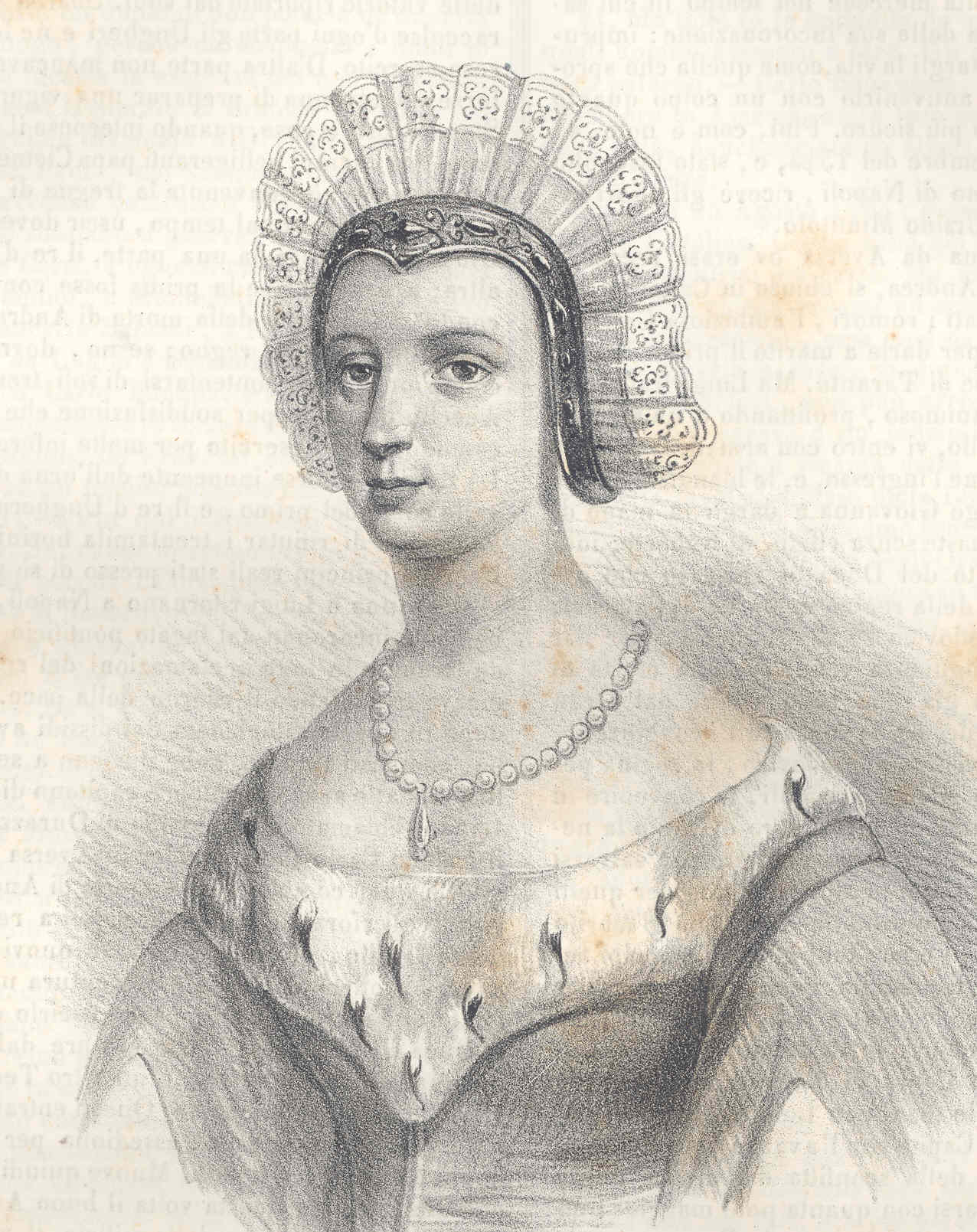
Portrait of Joanna of Anjou.

The listed works, commissioned by Charles I of Anjou, as recorded in ancient Angevin records, were performed by Pierre d'Angicourt, superintendent of the Royal Curia. Charles I died in Foggia in 1285 and was succeeded first by Charles II and then by Robert of Anjou. The latter, from 1308 to 1312, carried out the order of Charles II's Vicar to capture the Knights Templar residing in the city, who were detained in the castle dungeons.

In 1343, Robert of Anjou died and was succeeded to the throne by his niece Joanna of Anjou, wife of Andrew of Hungary, younger brother of King Louis of Hungary and Poland, who reigned for forty years in a convulsive period, which opened with Andrew's assassination in 1345, veiled by the doubt that it was a conspiracy operated by Queen Joanna. The end of Joanna of Anjou's reign came in 1382, when Charles III of Naples, husband of her niece Margaret, having occupied Naples and imprisoned the rulers, ordered the queen to be strangled. The following year, during the war of succession that saw the victory of Charles of Durazzo over Louis I of Anjou, Joanna's nephew, the castle of Barletta was occupied by Raimondo Orsini Del Balzo, under the orders of Charles. The latter was succeeded in 1386 by his son Ladislaus, who reigned until his death in 1414, when his sister Joanna II took power. The latter, lacking heirs, designated her successor first Alfonso V of Aragon, and then Louis III of Anjou, provoking in 1424 a war of succession between the two that had its sequel in the clash between Alfonso and Louis' brother, René of Anjou, and ended in 1442 with the ascension of the Aragonese ruler to the Kingdom of Naples.

=== Aragonese period (1442 - 1501) ===
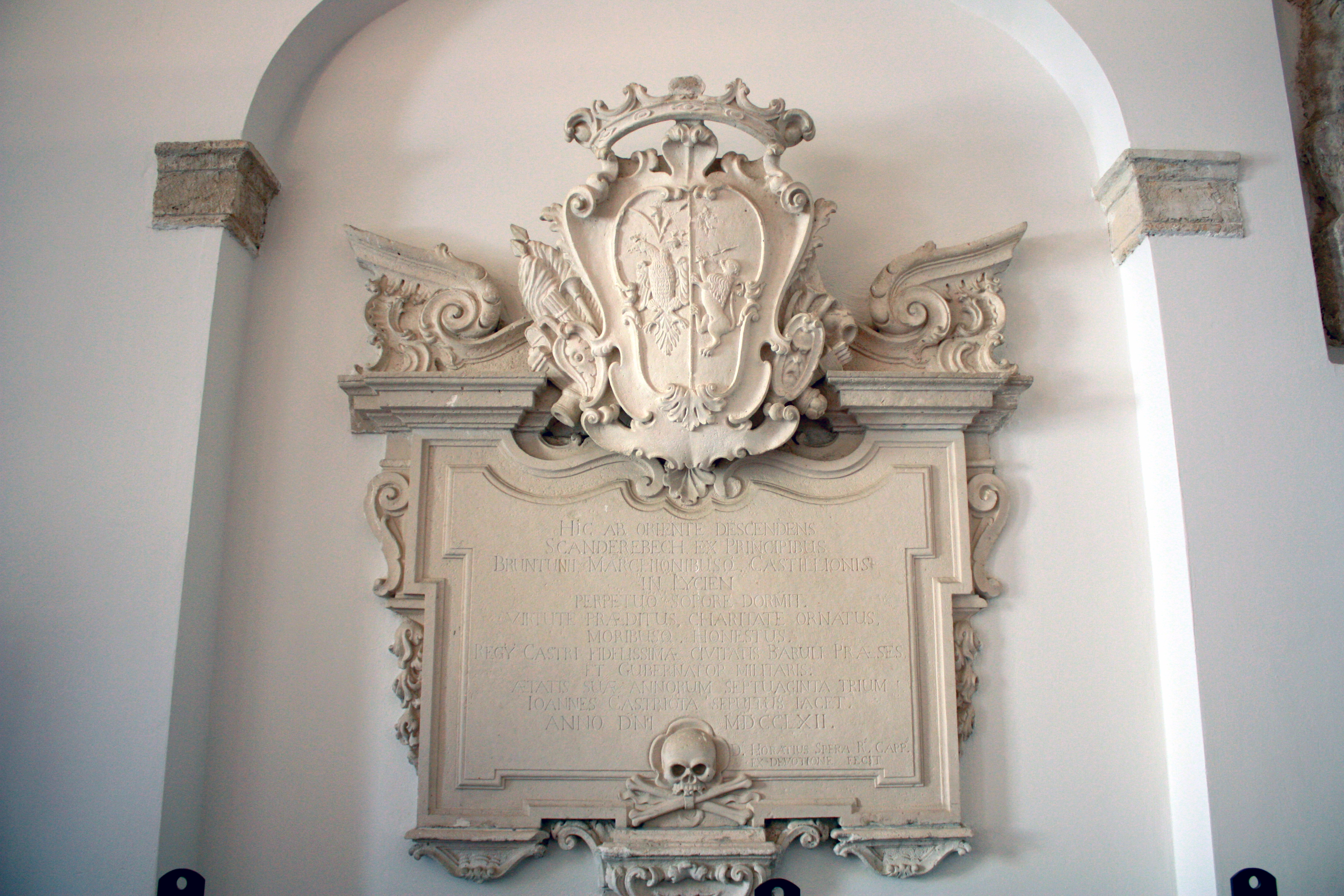
Tombstone of Giovanni Castriota Scanderbeg, castellan of Barletta from 1750 to 1762.

During the Aragonese rule, which was present in Barletta from 1442 to 1501, the defense structures of the castle and city walls were strengthened, particularly during the years 1458, 1461, and 1481. Upon Alfonso's death in 1458, he was succeeded by Ferdinand I of Naples, known as Ferrante of Aragon, who was crowned on February 4, 1459, in the church of Santa Maria in Barletta. The ruler was in Apulia two years later and, moving along the coast out of fear of enemy attacks from inland, he settled in the castle of Barletta, indulging in leisure and entertainment with the town's patricians, heedless of the approach of John of Anjou's troops. The siege was foiled by the men led by Gjergj Kastrioti Scanderbeg, who had come to the aid of the Aragonese ruler, to whom the latter then entrusted the protection of the city of Barletta by returning to Campania. Inside the hall of the castle where the bust of Frederick II is kept, testifying to the arrival of Gjergj Kastrioti in the military structure, there is the Scanderbeg coat of arms and a commemorative slab. In those same years the ruler continued the excavation of the moat and enlarged the city port to bring it back to the commercial needs of the period.

The last decade of the 15th century was marked by strong political instability, dictated by a series of successions to the throne, which began with the death of Ferdinand I in 1494 and ended with Frederick I of Naples, with whom the rule of the Aragonese dynasty ended in 1501, to which no further merits can be assigned beyond those concerning the strengthening of existing structures.

The events that brought the Spanish dynasty to power and led to the Challenge of Barletta were part of the clashes between Ferdinand II of Aragon and the French of Louis XII, culminating in the victory of the Spaniards in the battles of Cerignola and Garigliano in 1503, thus succeeding in completing, by the end of the same year, the conquest of the entire Kingdom of Naples in favor of Spain.

=== Spanish Period (1504 - 1707) ===
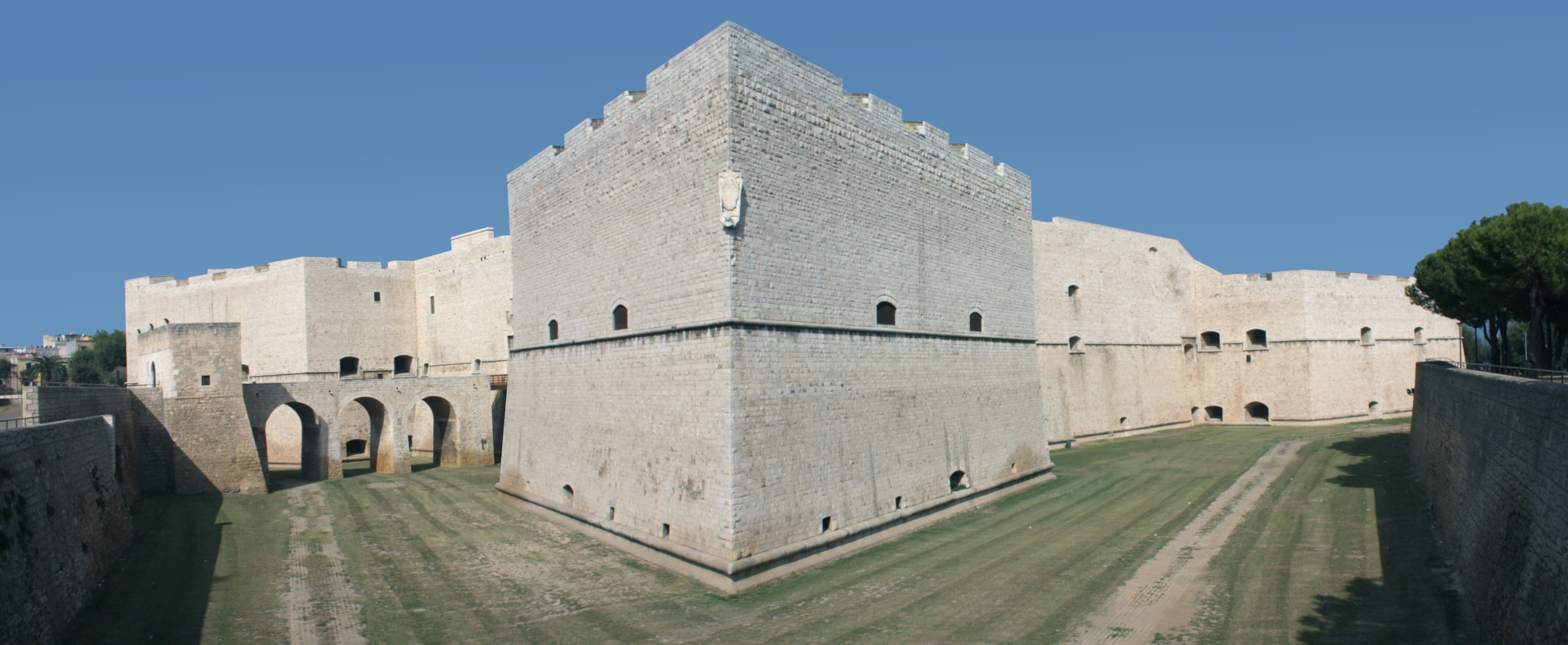
The castle of Barletta seen from the southeast, after Spanish interventions

With the arrival of the Spaniards, who occupied the Aragonese kingdom starting in 1504 as established by the Treaty of Lyon, work began first on the fortification of the walls, with the construction along the west coastline of the Paraticchio blockhouse, then between 1514 and 1519 the works for the construction of the fifth urban wall extended to the district of San Giacomo, with the building of Porta Nuova and Porta Reale. Consulting the Barletta Diplomatic Codex between 1514 and 1515, it is reported how the castle was in a precarious structural condition and how the structure was shown to be inadequate in the face of the advent of new artillery warfare techniques. The economic situation of the University of Barletta, on the other hand, was flourishing, being able to count on the presence of numerous merchants who came to the city from neighboring countries, as well as on the prestige offered by the presence of important bankers, coming from northern Italy and Greece.

In 1528 Barletta, torn by internal divisions and not yet completely surrounded by walls, so much so that the suburb of San Vitale and that of Sant'Antonio Abate to the east were still extra moenia, fell prey to a massive devastation at the hands of the French, suffering looting and fires that caused the destruction of numerous churches and convent buildings located beyond the walls. On that occasion, the castle was occupied by the French, who managed to gain access to it, aided by a faction of Barletta's people, through the walls to the east of the city, which were then undergoing strengthening works, but suffered no structural damage. With the Peace of Cambrai in 1529, the castle and the city of Barletta passed into the hands of Emperor Charles V of Habsburg, nephew of Ferdinand II of Aragon. The latter began work on adapting the castle to the building standards of the time starting in 1532. The work went on for over sixty years, with a further division into three phases: from 1532 to 1537; from 1555 to 1559; and from 1578 to 1598.

Under the leadership of the Habsburgs, the castle underwent a major transformation to prepare for possible enemy attacks no longer solely with cold weapons such as swords or spears but also with the use of gunpowder and cannons. Sixteenth-century construction methods involved castles that were no longer elevated in height, with watchtowers that were difficult to scale, but solid and particularly imposing structures, usually surrounded by large flat areas for more effective enemy control from the ground.

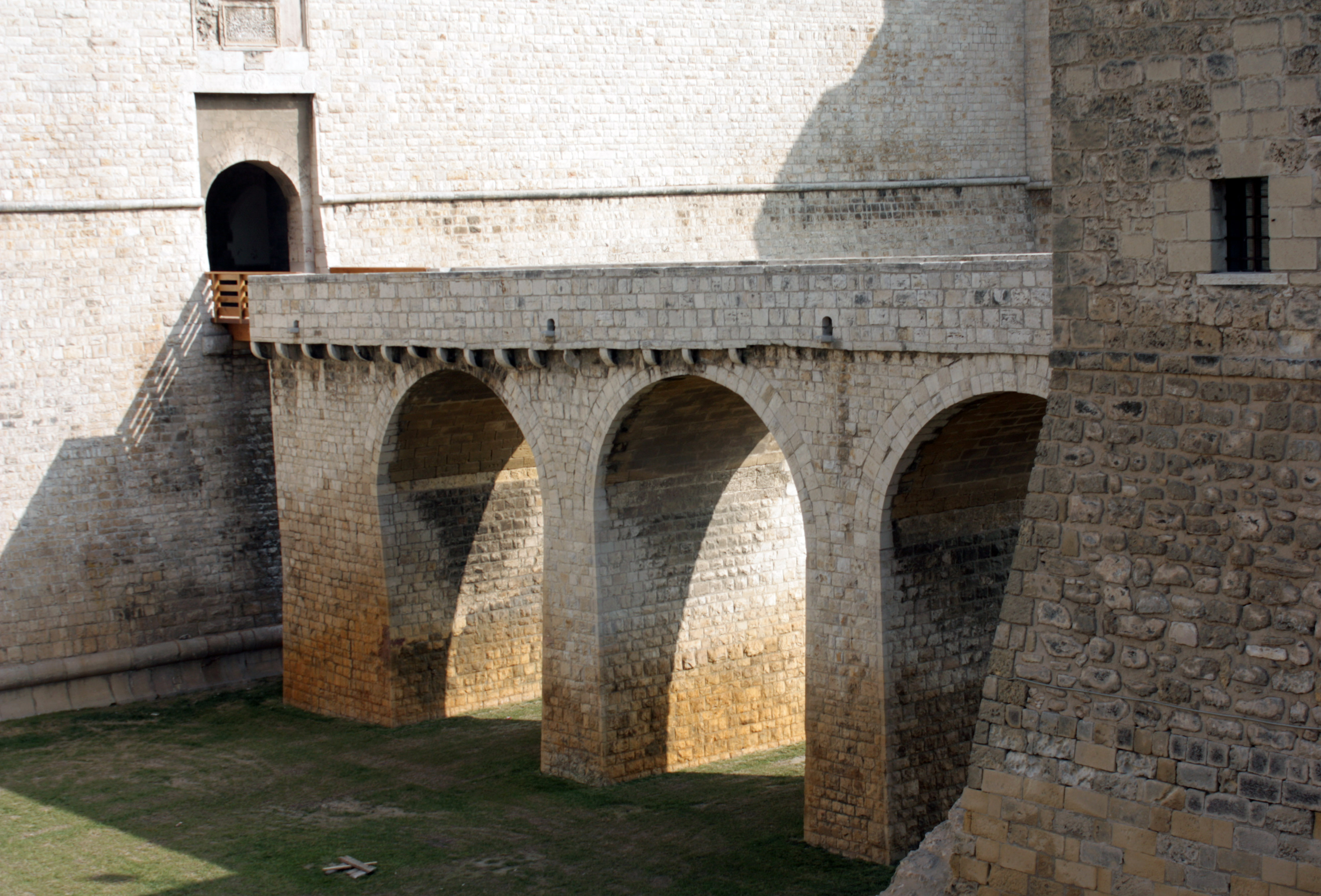
The stone bridge and the present wooden bridge, seen from the southwest.

Buildings in the vicinity of the castle were demolished to allow its renovation and with them some churches such as that of Santa Maria delli Frati and Santa Caterina. Charles V thus put in place an intervention to thicken the walls to a section between seven and twelve meters in size and to incorporate the old structures: the Angevin ones were encased in the newly built ones while all those parts that did not comply with the idea of grandeur and symmetry were demolished. Work at the hands of Charles V, under the direction of the military architect Evangelista Menga, initially lasted from 1532 to 1537 and then was continued by his successors until 1598. The main theme of the works was the construction of the four corner bastions. Their traditional denomination, which coincides with that used by architect Grisotti during the restoration work in the 1980s, dates back to 1559 in which they appear mentioned in a document, named respectively, from the southwest clockwise, St. Mary's, St. Vincent's, St. Anthony's, and Annunziata. In the early nineteenth century the naming of the ramparts was completely twisted and in a plan by an anonymous French author, the bastion of St. Mary is called "of St. James," the one of St. Vincent is called "of the bell," the one of St. Anthony is named "of St. Mary," and finally the bastion of the Annunziata is remembered as "of St. Vincent."

It was then carried out with new Spanish-style walls the covering of all structures belonging to previous eras, such as the Angevin palatium, the foundations of which form the walls of a cistern for collecting rainwater placed in the middle of the inner courtyard of the castle, the Norman towers and all the masonry up to that time.

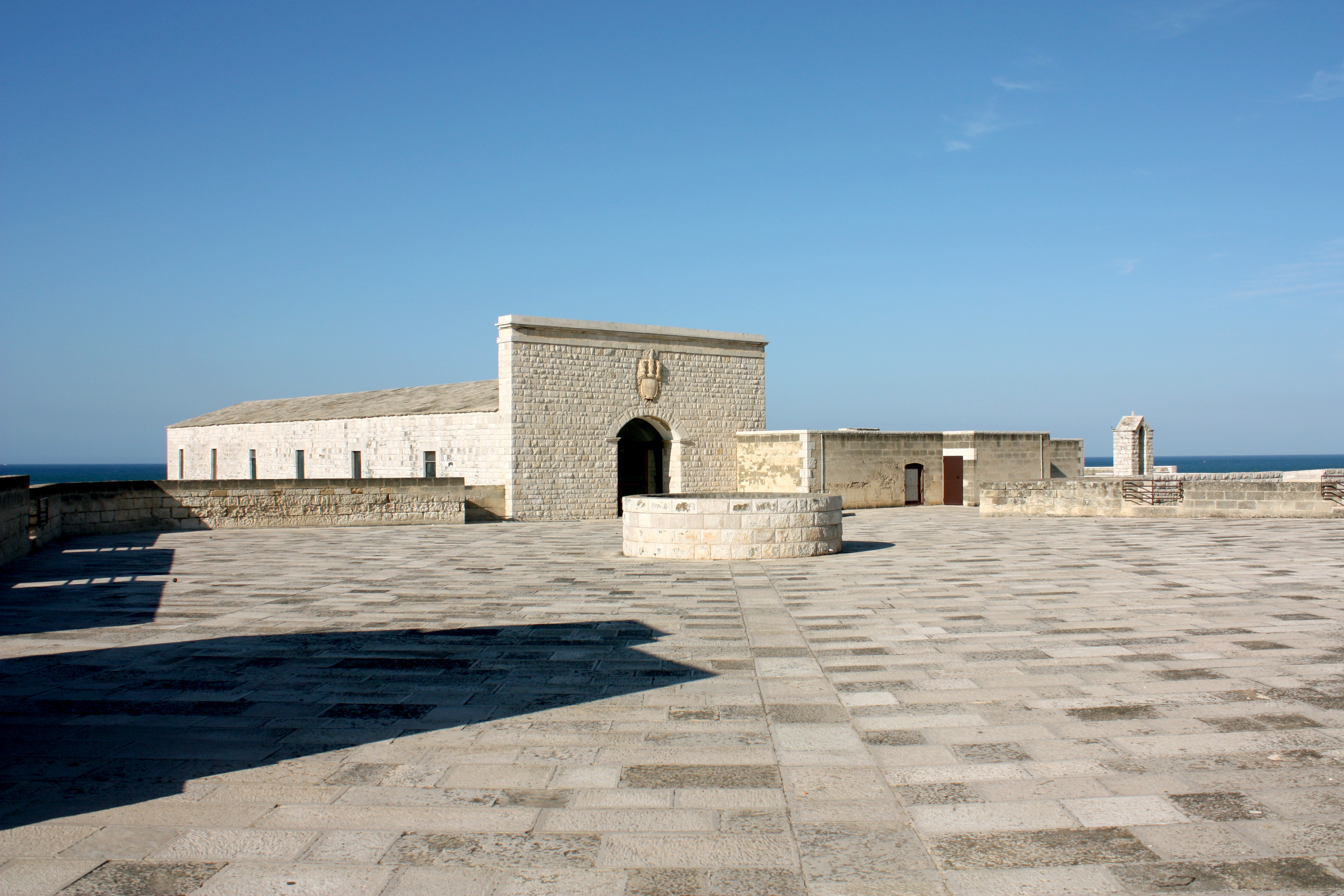
The building body of the bomb disposal laboratory and in the foreground the skylight of the casemate of St. Mary's bastion

The castle of Barletta thus assumed its present morphological appearance: a quadrangular structure, with four pentagonal bastions at the corners, an endowment of cannons on all sides and a moat that allowed detachment from the mainland on three sides. On the other hand, the fourth side, to the north, faced the coast so as to ensure defense toward the sea. Access to the castle was mediated by a wooden drawbridge, built entirely during the 16th century. However, the castle, renovated and adapted as a fortress, was never used for military purposes, due to the shift of interests from the Mediterranean basin to North and South America.

In the late sixteenth and early seventeenth centuries, new work began on the completion and maintenance of the castle, which also saw the promotion of a less arduous condition of habitability and the reclamation of marshy land in the city and areas near the same structure. In 1621 Philip IV of Spain put his hand to the maintenance work and decided to build on the roof of the west wing a bomb squad workshop. The earthquakes of 1627 and 1629 damaged numerous buildings in Barletta, but the castle did not observe any signs of collapse. Doing damage to the entire city, halving the number of Barletta's population, on the other hand, was the plague, which struck the city between 1656 and 1657. Tradition has it that the epidemic was halted in March 1657 through the intercession of Our Lady of the Sterpeto, whose icon was found at that time in one of the places devastated by the disease, in whose area the Shrine of the Virgin was built.

With the death in the early eighteenth century of Charles II of Spain, the seventeen-year-old Duke Philip of Anjou was proclaimed the new king of Spain, thus becoming the owner of the castle.

=== From the 18th to the 21st century ===
The arrival of Philip of Anjou caused a war of succession to break out between France and Austria. The Habsburgs, taking possession first of Lombardy and then of the Kingdom of Naples, succeeded in holding power from 1707 to 1734 under the leadership of Charles VI of Austria. During these 27 years the castle of Barletta was left to fall into a state of neglect and serious decay, evidenced by an "inventory of the ammunition for food and war of the Royal Castle of Barletta," dating from 1722, through which the complete lack of maintenance or restoration by the Austrian government was made known. The state of the work then became apparent in 1734, when Giulio Borromeo Visconti, Austrian viceroy, on the eve of the Battle of Bitonto took refuge in the Barletta castle, finding it unfit for use.

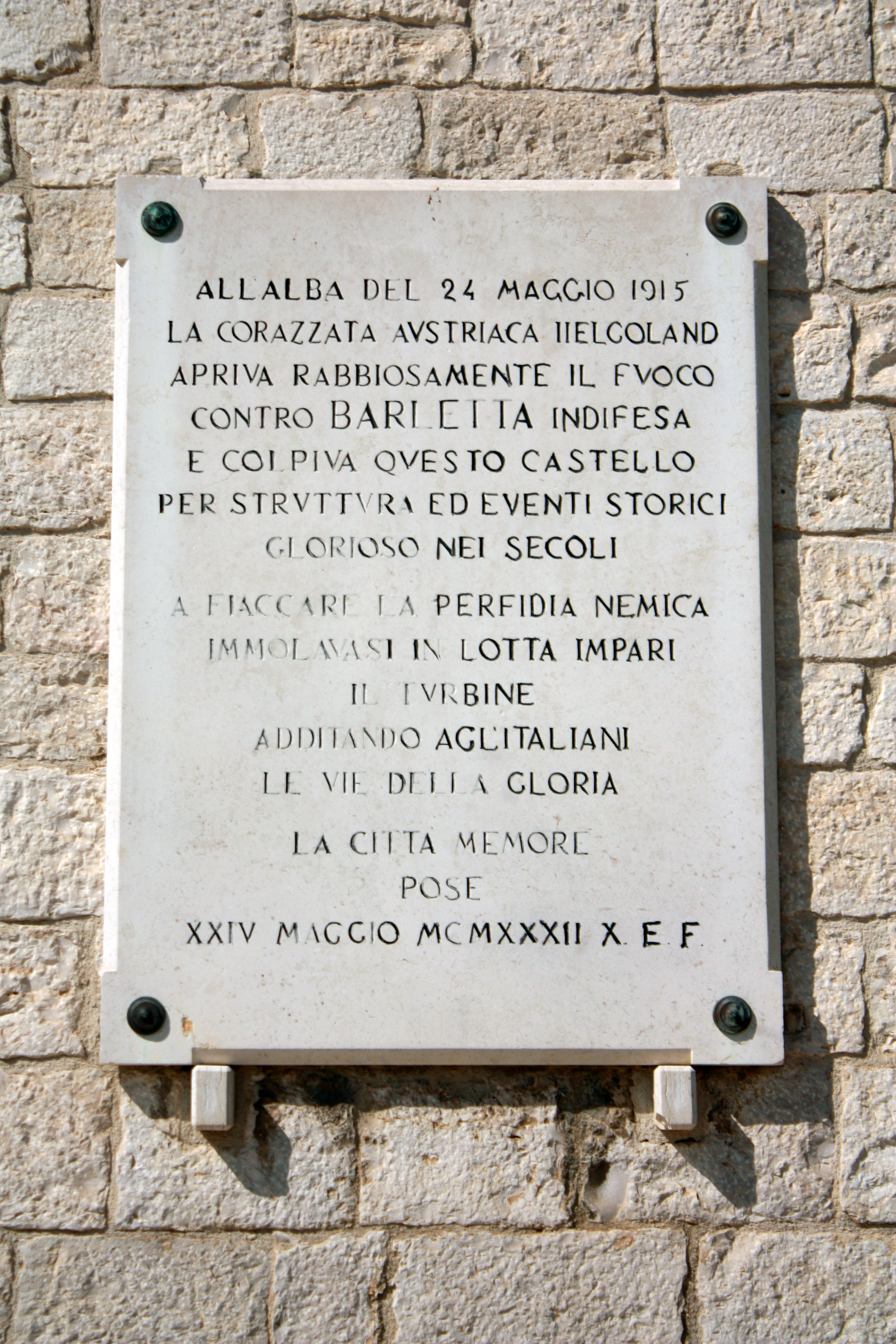
Marble plaque placed on the ravelin, commemorating the Austrian attack during World War I.

The end of the Austrian viceroyalty came on May 25, 1734, with the Battle of Bitonto, fought against the Bourbons of Spain led by Charles III of Spain, son of Philip V. With the 1740 Treaty of Peace, Navigation and Trade concluded with the Ottoman Empire, fears of Turkish invasion ended and with it the need for the defensive system typical of military architecture. The Bourbons ruled stably until 1799, with the handover between Charles III and his son Ferdinand in 1759. Right at the end of the 18th century, in the wake of the First Italian Campaign of the troops of Republican France, after the French Revolution, revolutionary uprisings began which led to the proclamation of the Neapolitan Republic. Barletta was among the first cities to join the insurrectional movement, so much so that the French protectorate was able to reach until 1805, continuing, after the coronation of Napoleon Bonaparte, with a full-fledged French rule, which saw from 1806 to 1808 the presence of Joseph Bonaparte, the emperor's brother, followed by Joachim Murat until 1813. The French general, after visiting the castle of Barletta on April 14, 1813, ordered works to consolidate the defensive structures, in view of a possible clash with European powers, which allowed the return of the Bourbons to the command, until the Unification of Italy. Between 1860 and 1870 the castle was used as a military prison, but in 1876, after being considered militarily useless, it was auctioned and awarded to the Municipality of Barletta, for the sum of 30,100 liras.

The last military affair involving the castle of Barletta took place on May 24, 1915, when during the initial phase of Italy's participation in the Adriatic campaign of World War I the Austro-Hungarian light cruiser Helgoland struck the northern front and the northern bastion, which were exposed to the sea, with six cannon shells. The castle managed to avoid further blows thanks to the intervention of the Italian destroyer Turbine, which arrived in defense of the city.

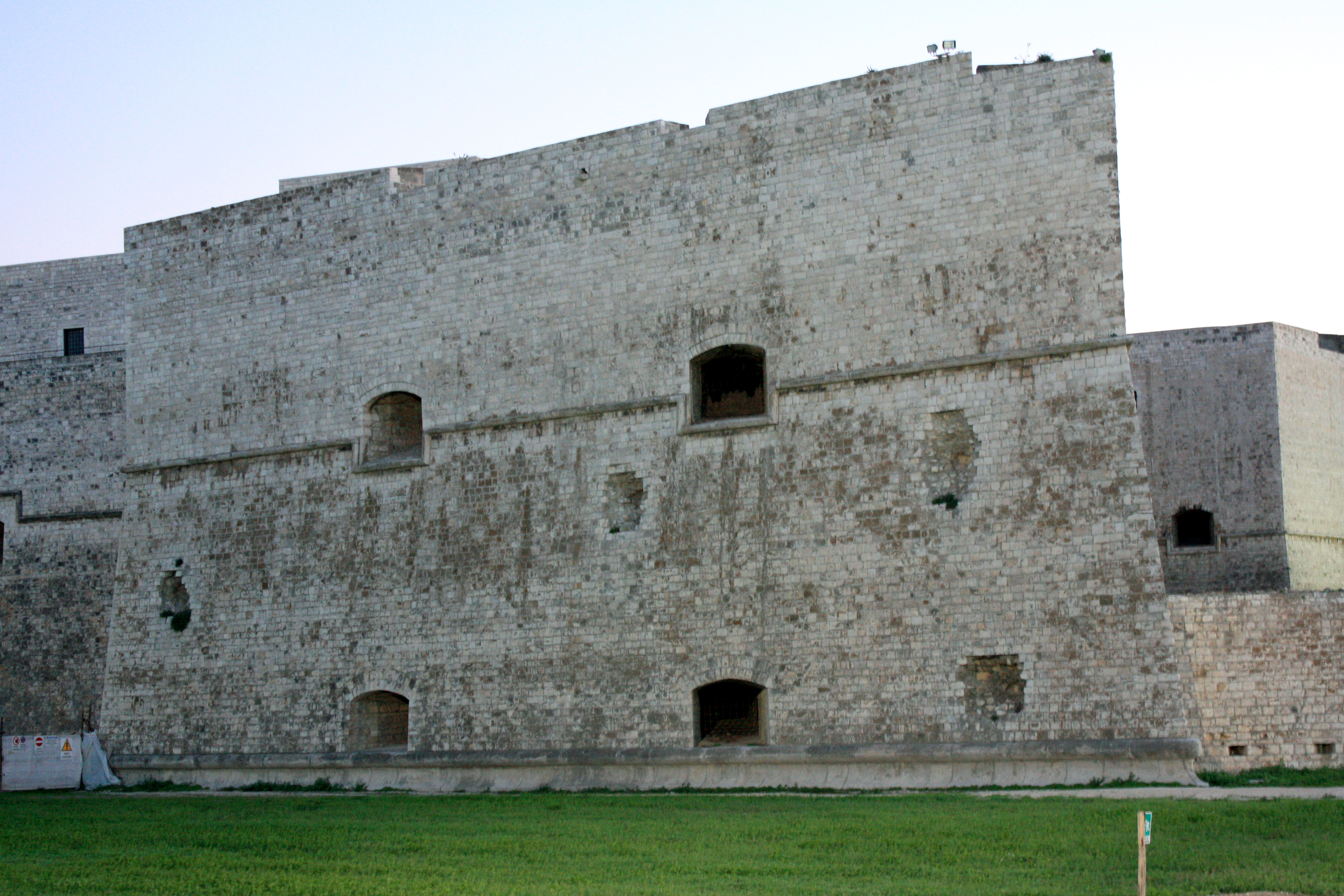
Gunshot marks on the bastion of St. Vincent, inflicted during World War I.

A marble plaque affixed to the southern facade of the ravelin on May 24, 1932, to commemorate the event on its 17th anniversary bears the inscription:

At dawn on 24 May 1915, the Austrian battleship [sic] Helgoland rabidly opened fire on defenseless Barletta and struck this castle, glorious over the centuries because of its structure and historical events. To sap the perfidious enemy, the Turbine sacrificed herself in an unequal struggle, pointing the Italians to the path of glory. Placed in memory by the city. XXIV May MCMXXXII XI E.F.

— Inscription on the marble plaque affixed to the entrance of the ravelin.

In September 1943, during World War II, the castle was home to a military garrison that put up strenuous resistance to the German army, which was determined to occupy the town following the armistice between the Italians and the Allies. The entry of German troops into the city culminated in the massacre of September 12. Three years later, the tidying up of the castle's gardens, which until then had been left in disuse, was ordered.

Restoration work on the entire castle structure took place between 1973 and 1987, with the commissioning of engineer Marcello Grisotti on May 8, 1973. When the work was completed, the castle returned to the use of the city and tourists, due in part to the installation of the Civic Museum, temporary exhibitions and lectures, and the use of the Frederician wing as the municipal library. On December 7, 2002, after about two years of further restoration, which saw the redevelopment of the castle gardens transformed into a park with equipped areas, the entire area was returned to the citizens of Barletta, who made it a focal point of the historic center.

On May 24, 2019, a monument in memory of the men killed in the loss of Turbine was dedicated in the gardens in front of the castle on the 104th anniversary of Turbine′s sinking.

== Description ==
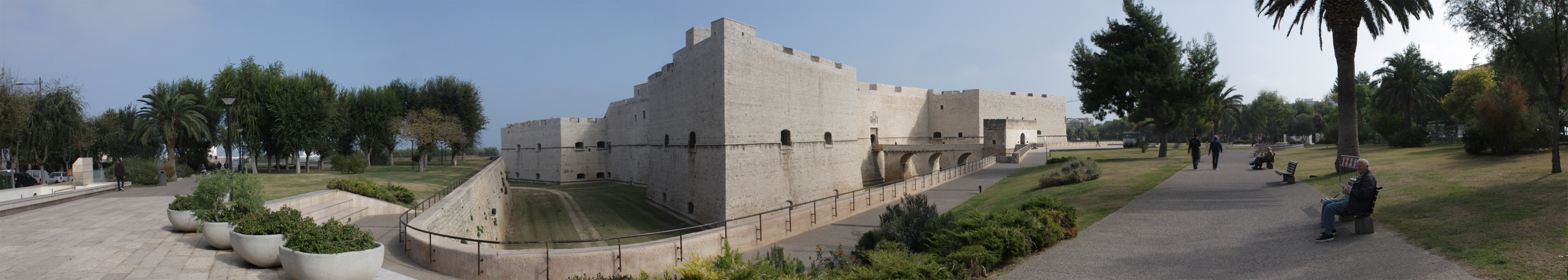
Overview of the castle with a view from the southwest side.

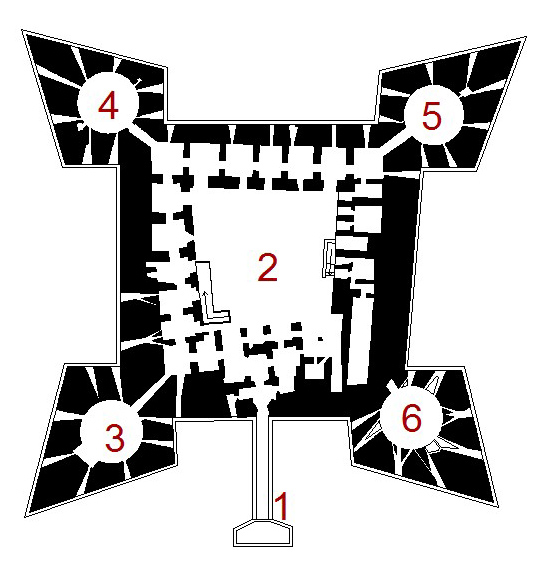
Floor plan of the ground floor of Barletta Castle.: 1. Ravelin; 2. Inner courtyard; 3. Bastion of St. Mary; 4. Bastion of St. Vincent; 5. Bastion of St. Anthony; 6. Annunziata Bastion

The castle is located in the square of the same name within the Santa Maria district, northeast of the city. It is a strategic point in city life, as well as a strong urban core: in fact, the urban fabric of Barletta developed from the dual ecclesiastical and military polarity given by the proximity of the cathedral of Santa Maria Maggiore and the castle.

The dimensions of the outer sides of the castle, measured at the base of the frame of the corner bastions, are variable, with the east front, the longest of all, being about 127 meters long, the west front, shorter by three meters, and the south and north ones, both about 120 meters long. The diagonal between the tips of the ramparts measures about 125 meters, within which there are two tiers of superimposed casemates with a diameter of 16 meters. The height of the west front, the tallest one given the presence of the bomb disposal laboratory building, corresponds to about 24 meters while the north front, the shortest, has a maximum height of 19 meters. The walls of the castle vary in thickness from 5 to 12 meters and are built of limestone cut into squared and barely rusticated blocks, much of which was taken from buildings destroyed during the sack of 1528.

It is surrounded by the gardens, named after the Cervi brothers, on all sides except the north front, and is separated from them by the wide and deep moat, which at its lowest point reaches ten meters in depth from the floor level of the castle access bridge. The building possesses a polar layout (Note: An architectural layout can be called "polar" if all spaces are organized around its central point (pole, in this case the inner courtyard) from a distributional and constructive point of view. Strappa, p. 148.) of a quadrangular shape, with the characteristic pentagonal lance-shaped ramparts at the four corners and the four arms of the building joining them together. In the middle is the square courtyard.

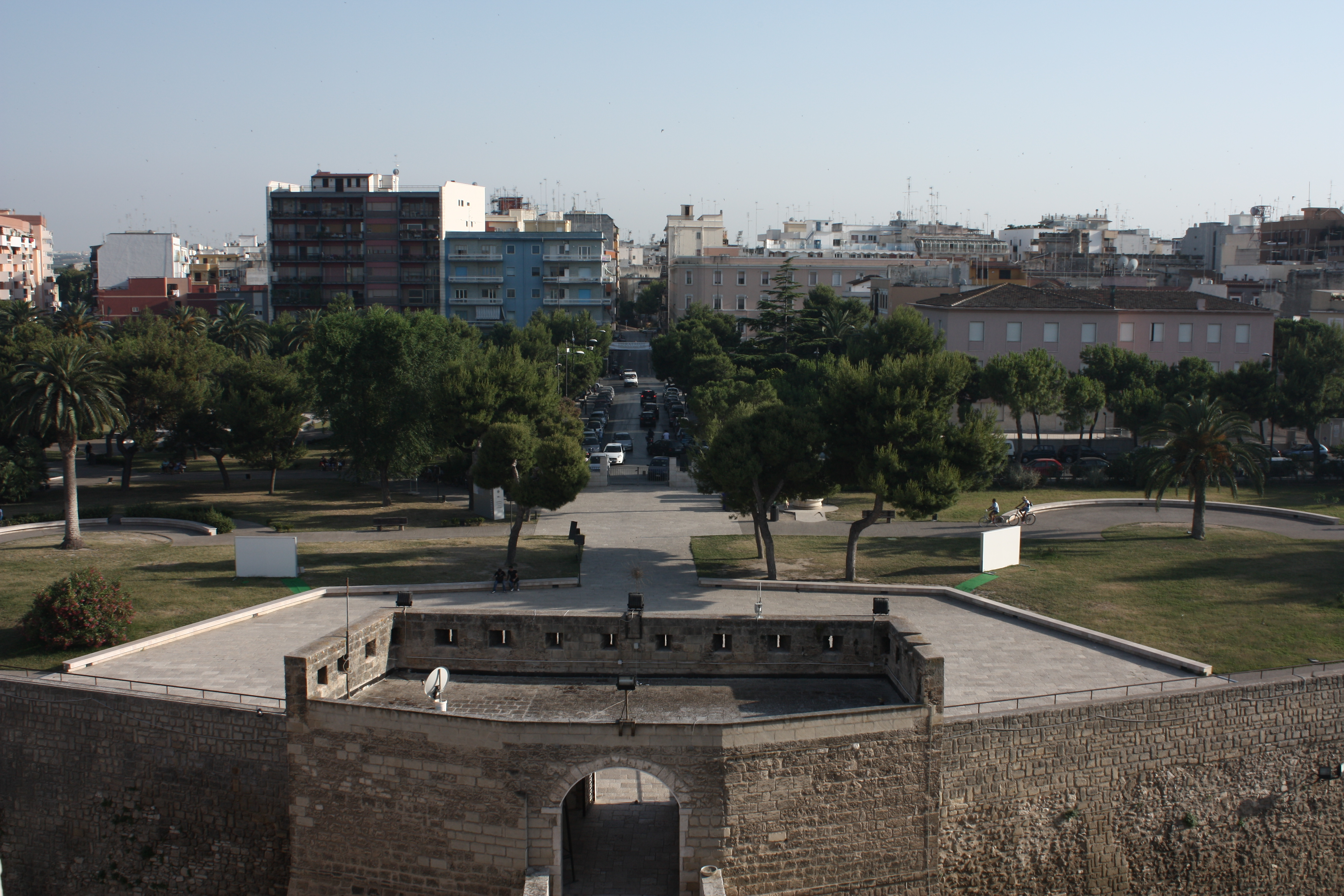
Southward view of the ravelin and castle gardens.

All the elevations of the castle are vertically divided into three parts: the lower part with the slight scarp basement ends at the top with a rather protruding torus molding, in some cases interrupted by the presence of embrasures for cannon; the first elevation, which sees at the base the presence of embrasures for the cannons and sometimes other small ventilation holes, characterized by the typical stone face of the Barletta castle, bordered above by a further torus molding of smaller size than the base molding, also sometimes interrupted by the presence of the usual embrasures; the upper part marked by the exposed masonry is crowned by a merlon. At the top of the edge of the southeastern bastion stands the stone coat of arms of the Spanish dynasty.

The entrance to the castle is preceded by an opening, called the "parade ground," in front of which stands the ravelin. Once past this first access one finds oneself in front of a masonry bridge with three arches. The fourth arch, made of tuff, was replaced by a wooden bridge during restoration work between 1973 and 1987. Maintenance work regarding only the wooden bridge took place between October 6 and October 17, 2008. The entrance portal opens in the center of the southern facade and has a rectangular entrance encased in an archway. The quadrangular entrance is surmounted by an ornately decorated architrave and a stone slab testifying to the delivery of the castle in 1584.

=== Exterior ===
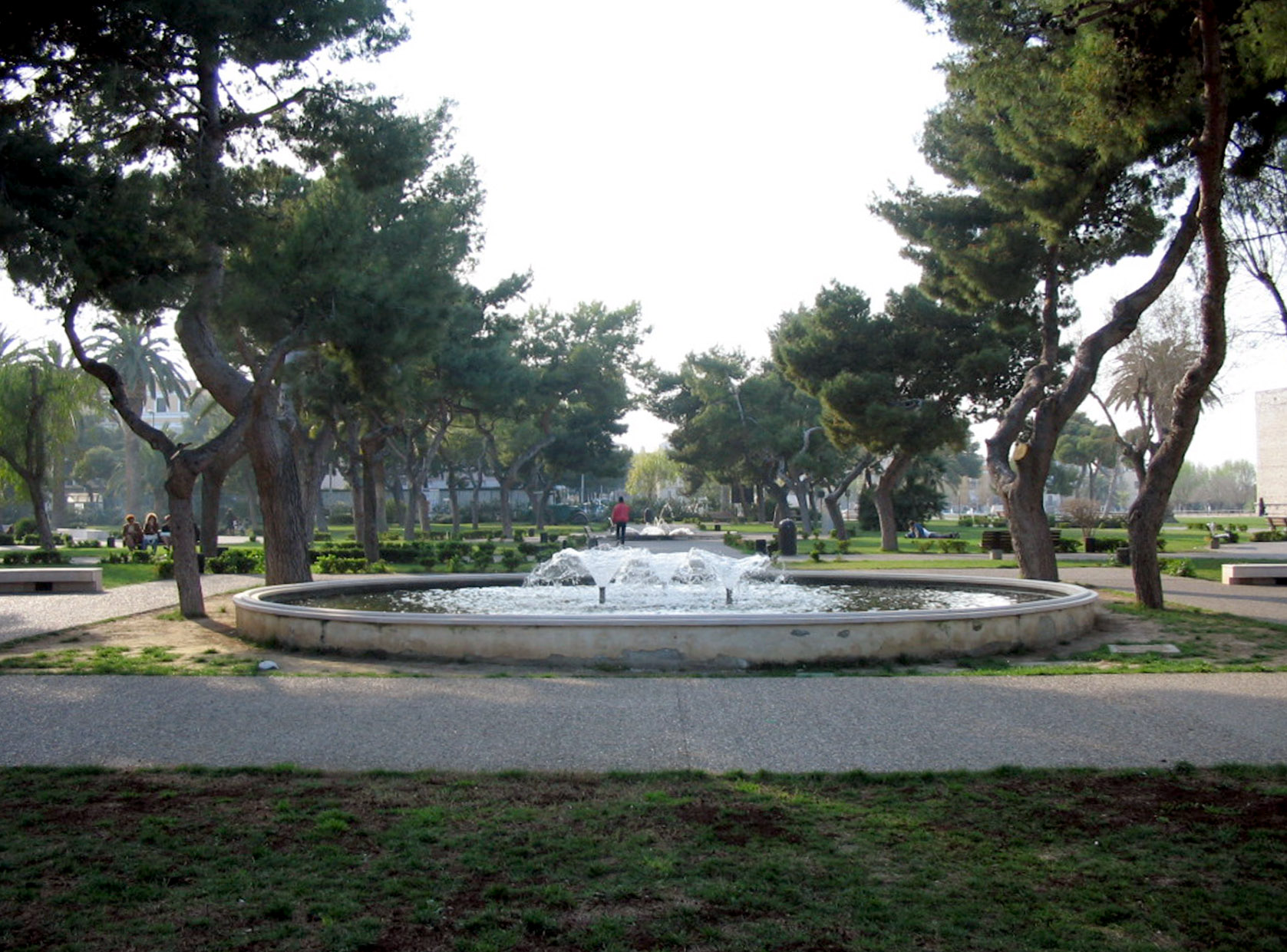
A view of the Cervi Brothers Gardens surrounding the castle

==== The moat ====
The castle is surrounded on all sides by a moat about twenty-four meters wide in relation to the sides of the ramparts and thirty-five meters wide in relation to the outer walls of the castle curtains. It widens further on the northern front, toward the sea, exceeding one hundred and ten meters, expanding into an arena, about one hundred meters away from the waters of the sea. It is surrounded by a retaining wall with a total length equal to about seven hundred meters and a maximum height of seven meters. Placed 1.50 meters above sea level and 7.85 meters below the castle's entrance level, from the Norman period it was surrounded by the waters of the sea, and during Angevin rule the shoreline lapped its northern front. As early as the end of the 16th century, historical plans testify to the retreat of the waters and the transformation of the moat into a marshy area, which from the late 20th century was cultivated at least until 1931. The first document in which an order for the construction of the moat appears is dated February 10, 1280, in which its construction is requested starting from the east front, the one towards Trani, passing through the south side, up to the northwest tower, leaving the north walls in direct contact with the waters of the sea. At the end of the 15th century Ferdinand I of Naples continued its excavation and on September 5, 1515, fearing the danger of war, the mayor requested the completion of the works concerning the moat and the city walls.

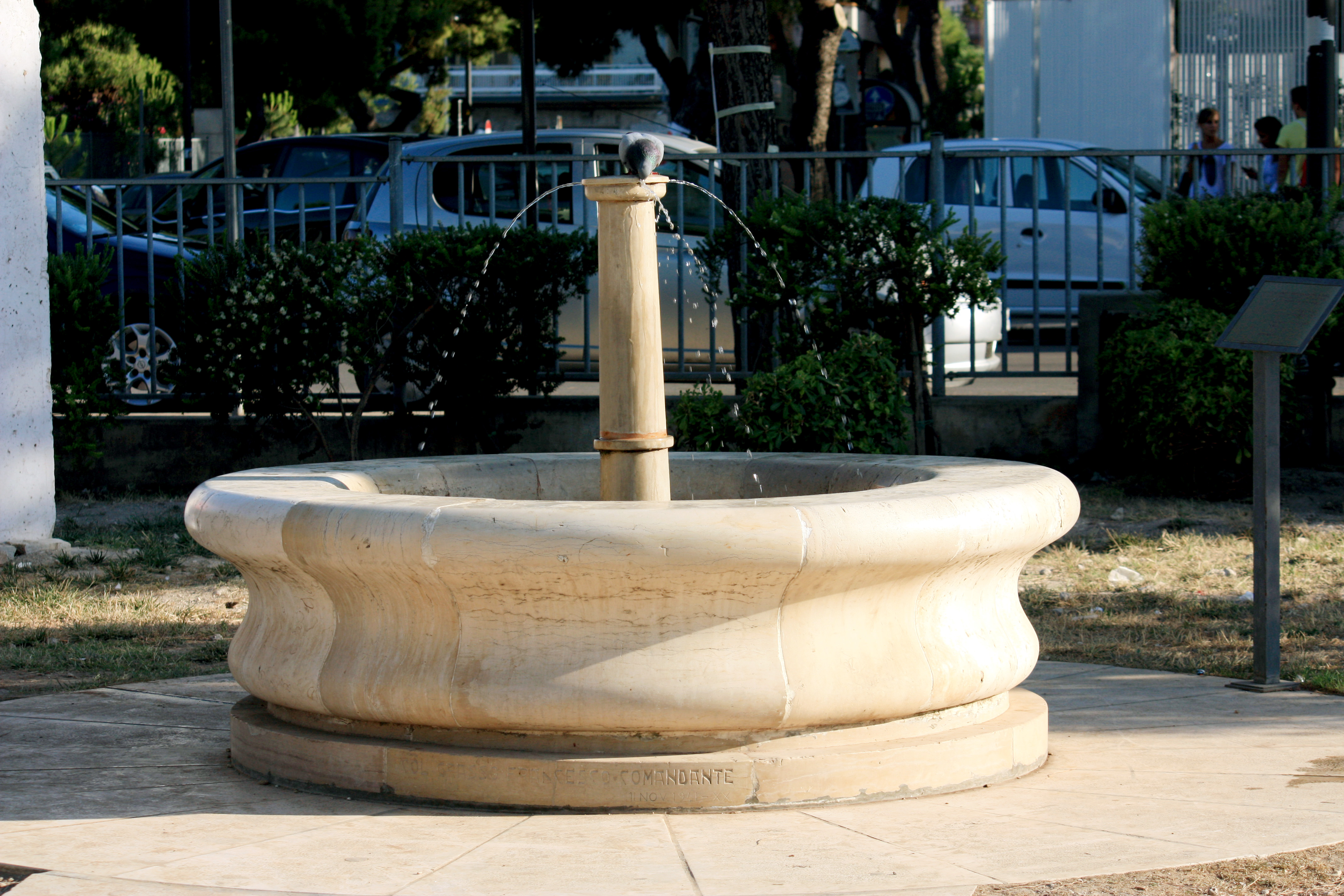
Historic fountain in the castle gardens

Restoration work between 1973 and 1987 also involved the moat and retaining walls, which was renovated in accordance with earthquake regulations with a sewage outflow system. In 2004, the municipal administration then provided for the further enhancement of the moat through the construction of a turf with an associated irrigation system.

==== The gardens ====
The castle gardens, named after the Cervi Brothers, extend on all sides around the castle, except along the entire northern front, located near the sea. These underwent restoration works aimed at upgrading the state of the places and the lighting system, to be transformed into a park with equipped areas, and after two years, on December 7, 2002, they were returned to the citizens of Barletta, who made them a focal point of the historic center. Near the main entrance to the gardens, located in axis with the ravelin, is the historic ornamental fountain, strongly desired by the soldiers of the Military District and inaugurated on November 11, 1941. Left unused and then partially destroyed after the wartime episodes on June 12, 2004, the fountain was reconstructed and reactivated, partly due to painstaking restoration work on the stone blocks, thus fulfilling its function as a drinking water distribution point.

==== The ravelin and the entrance bridge ====
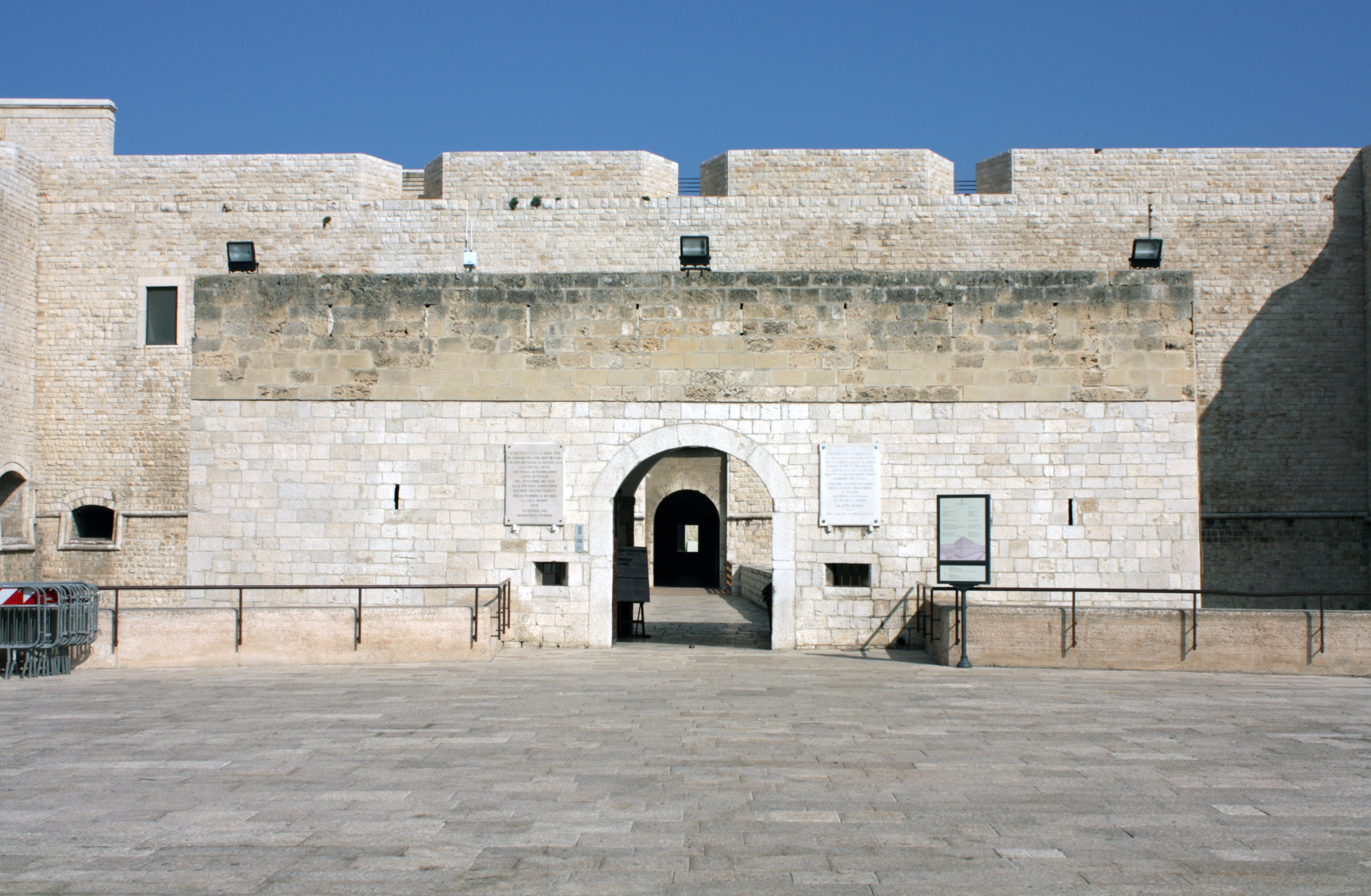
The ravelin of the castle of Barletta

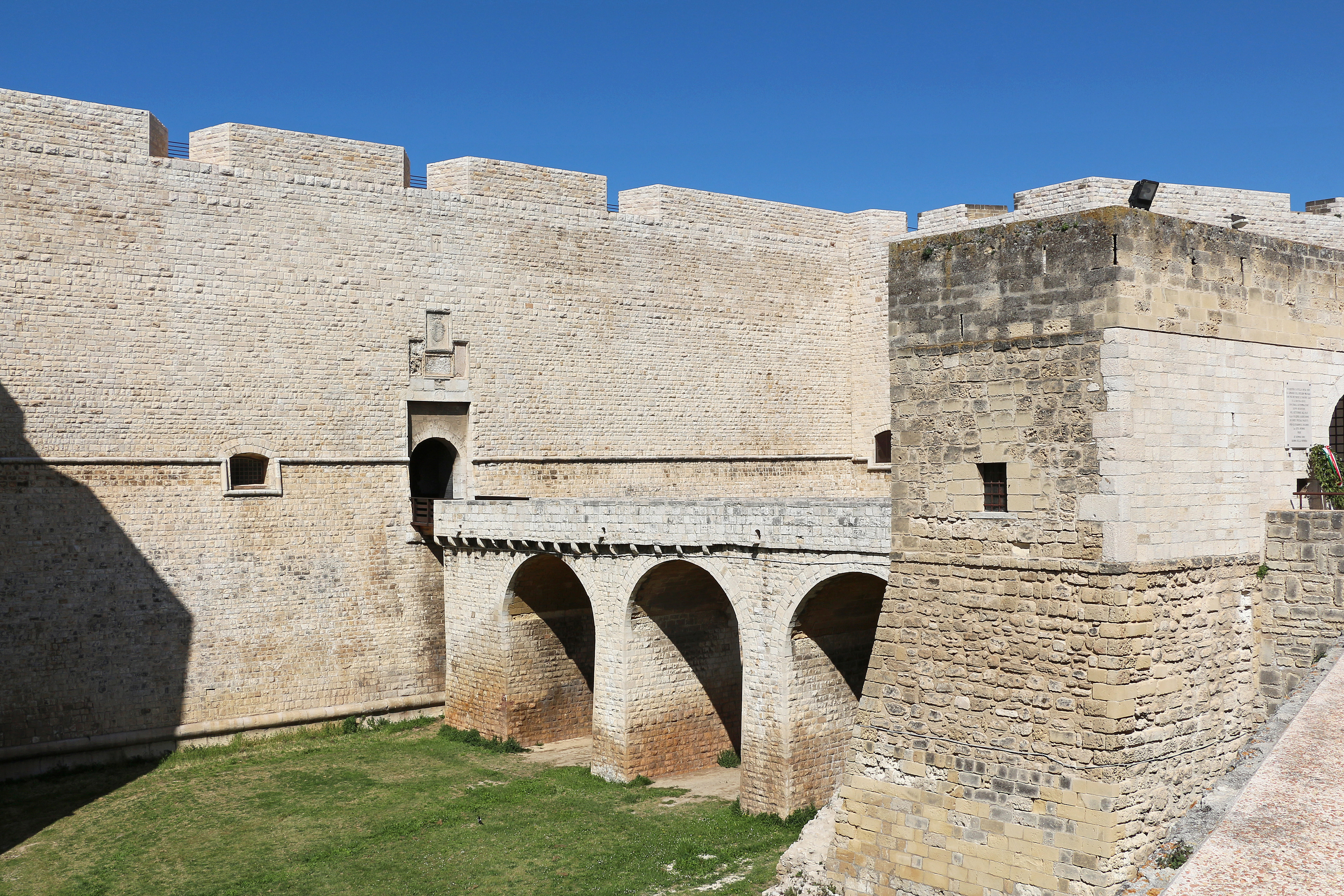
The entrance bride of the castle

Access to the castle is mediated by the presence of the ravelin and the subsequent bridge over the moat. Until the 18th century, the ravelin was part of a larger defense system that, through winding paths, led to the widening in front of the guardhouse. This is divided into two lateral compartments from the central atrium, each having a hole in the wall opposite the entrance, while the roof is enclosed by tuff masonry provided with embrasures, except on the side facing the bridge where the parapet is lower to allow military maneuvers with the interior. During restoration work in the 1980s, the presence of a staircase was revealed to have led from the west compartment onto the structure's terrace. However, the staircase that was found was not made usable because the ravelin lacks an exit to the terrace, so arrival on the solar slab can only be from the masonry deck through the use of an external staircase.

Once past the ravelin, until Grisotti's restoration, the entrance bridge to the castle was supported by three massive vertical piers and as many arches, in addition to a smaller arch connecting the last pier with the castle which can be dated to around the 19th century, thus after the removal of the drawbridge. (Note: "Historical matrix" in architecture means the historical-architectural value of an artifact. In this case, architect Grisotti was prompted to tear down the arch firstly because of its precarious static condition and secondly because it had no historical, testimonial, or architectural significance that could presuppose its, albeit complicated, structural restoration. Grisotti, p. 114.) Restoration work, considering the precarious condition and lacking historical matrix, led to the demolition of the latter arch and, due to the discovery of the support point of the ancient drawbridge built at the end of the 16th century and remained there until its removal in 1861, to the construction of a fixed wooden connecting structure that would evoke the ancient movable protection system. The wooden bridge underwent new maintenance in 2008, with the replacement of the wooden beams.

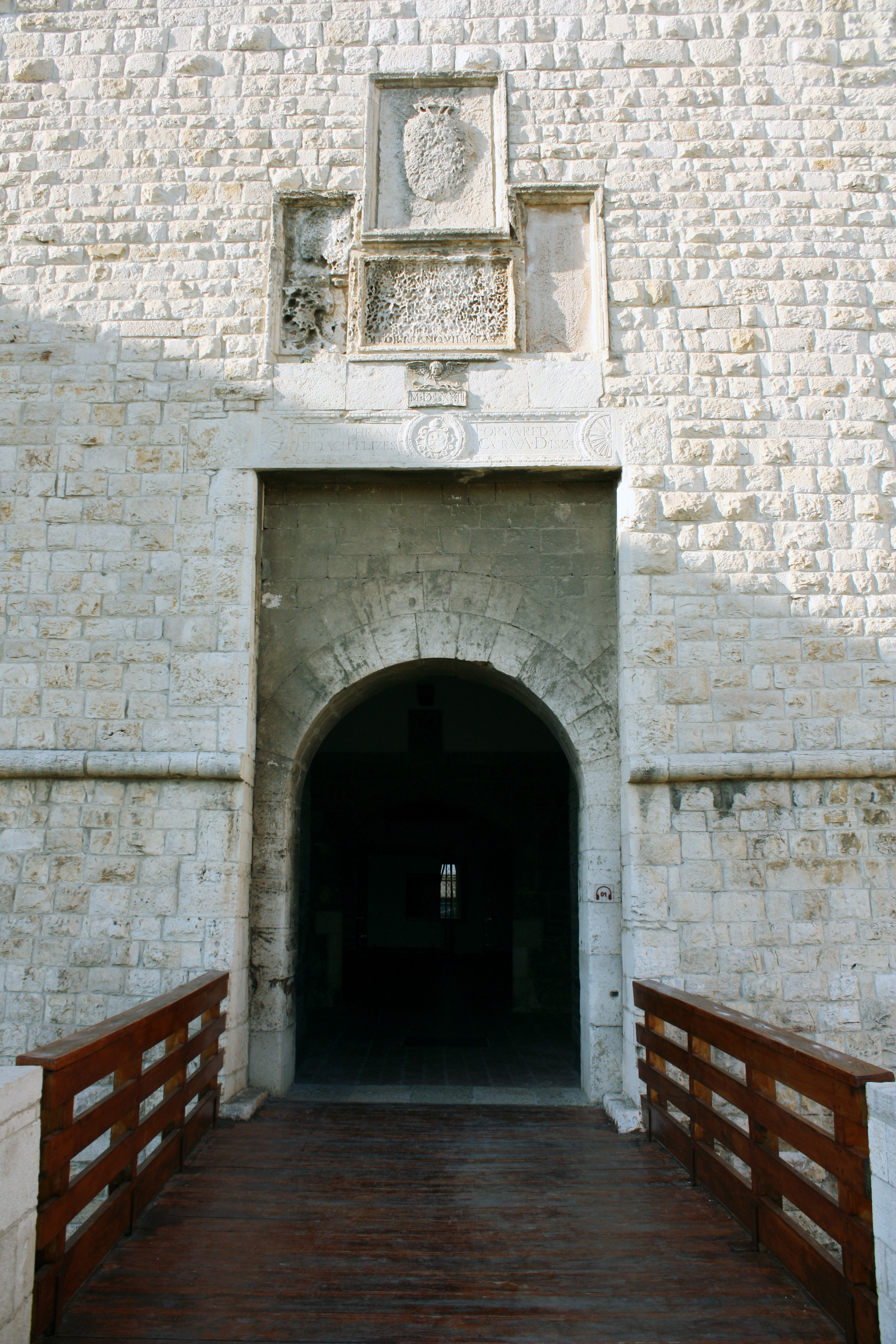
The entrance portal to the castle

==== The entrance portal and exterior fronts ====
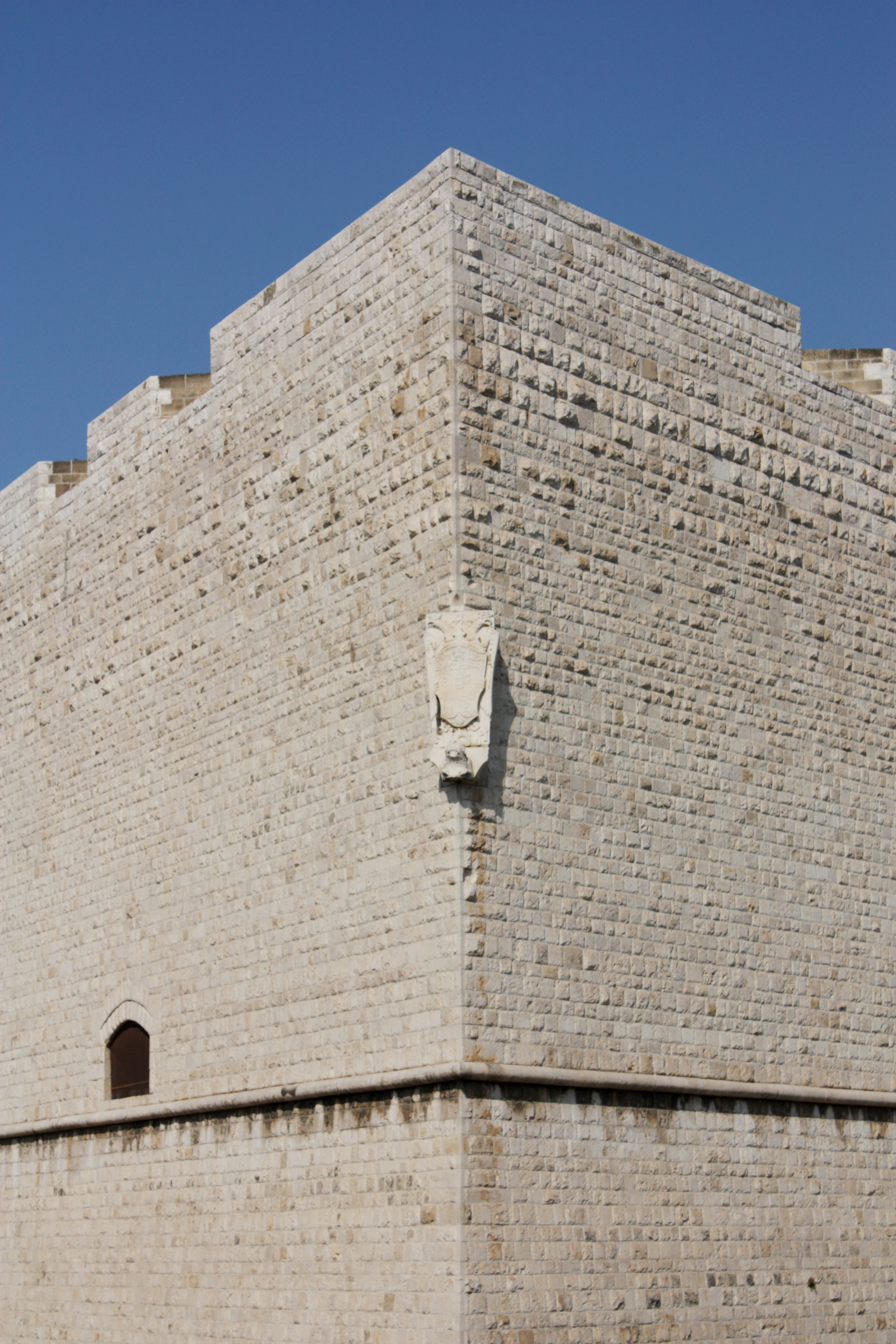
Detail of the southeastern bastion in which the shield of the Aragonese dynasty is visible.

The gateway to the castle consists of a round arch recessed in a rectangular ashlar portion of the exterior wall. Above the rectangular hole is an architrave, sandwiched between two shell-shaped decorations, on which stands an inscription in Latin preceded by a Greek cross and divided into two parts by a rosette-shaped decoration, which reads:

In pulchram formam redactum didaci felizes cura A.D. 1584

Rendered in beautiful form by Diego Felizes. Year of our Lord 1584

— Latin inscription on the architrave of the entrance portal.

It should be mentioned that Diego Feliz, mentioned in the inscription, was a castellan of the building, in which he died in 1584. Immediately above the architrave, four stone blocks with an angel's head in the center and the date "MDLXXIII" support four large slabs, also made of stone: a central one arranged horizontally that bears an inscription of which only the word "tranquillitas" is legible, two vertical lateral ones and another central vertical slab on which there is a barely legible coat of arms. The discordance between the two dates on the same front was interpreted by the architect and engineer Marcello Grisotti, author of the castle's restoration, as a desire to give greater dignity to the entrance portal by assembling stone material dating from different times and places. It is possible that the architrave originally belonged to a hypothetical chapel of Angevin workmanship, given the presence of the cross before the inscription. In axis with the portal but in a higher position is a decoration with a dagger, cross-hilted, pointing downward and dating back to 1585, as evidenced by the engraving on the plaque itself.

All the fronts of the castle are characterized, from bottom to top, by a small portion of smooth stone scarp wall surmounted by a cornice with torus molding, from which departs the lower part of the main masonry, scarped in ashlar stone. At about mid-height of the gables there is a second cornice with torus molding that marks the beginning of the upper part of the masonry, again in ashlar stone but no longer scarp, which ends at the top with a merlon. Both the lower and upper masonry have a series of splayed openings, some of which were originally used as embrasures, others as skylights. Notably, until a few years after 1860, from the northern and southern fronts, cannons on feast days fired twenty-one blanks at dawn, noon, and dusk, respectively. The west side appears to be higher than the others due to the presence, on the roof plane, of the bomb squad room and rooms formerly used as soldiers' quarters. The north front, on the other hand, shows signs of the cannonades suffered during World War I. Other noteworthy decorations present on the exterior elevations include the presence of the Aragonese coat of arms on the major edge of the southeastern bastion, as well as numerous male masks, lion protomes and shields, both on the pentagonal bastions and on the rectilinear flanks. Near the bastion of St. Vincent, within the castle moat, it is possible to make out the remnants of the junction between the castle and the ancient wall that joined to the northwest with the walls of Barletta.

The Sarcophagus of the Apostles

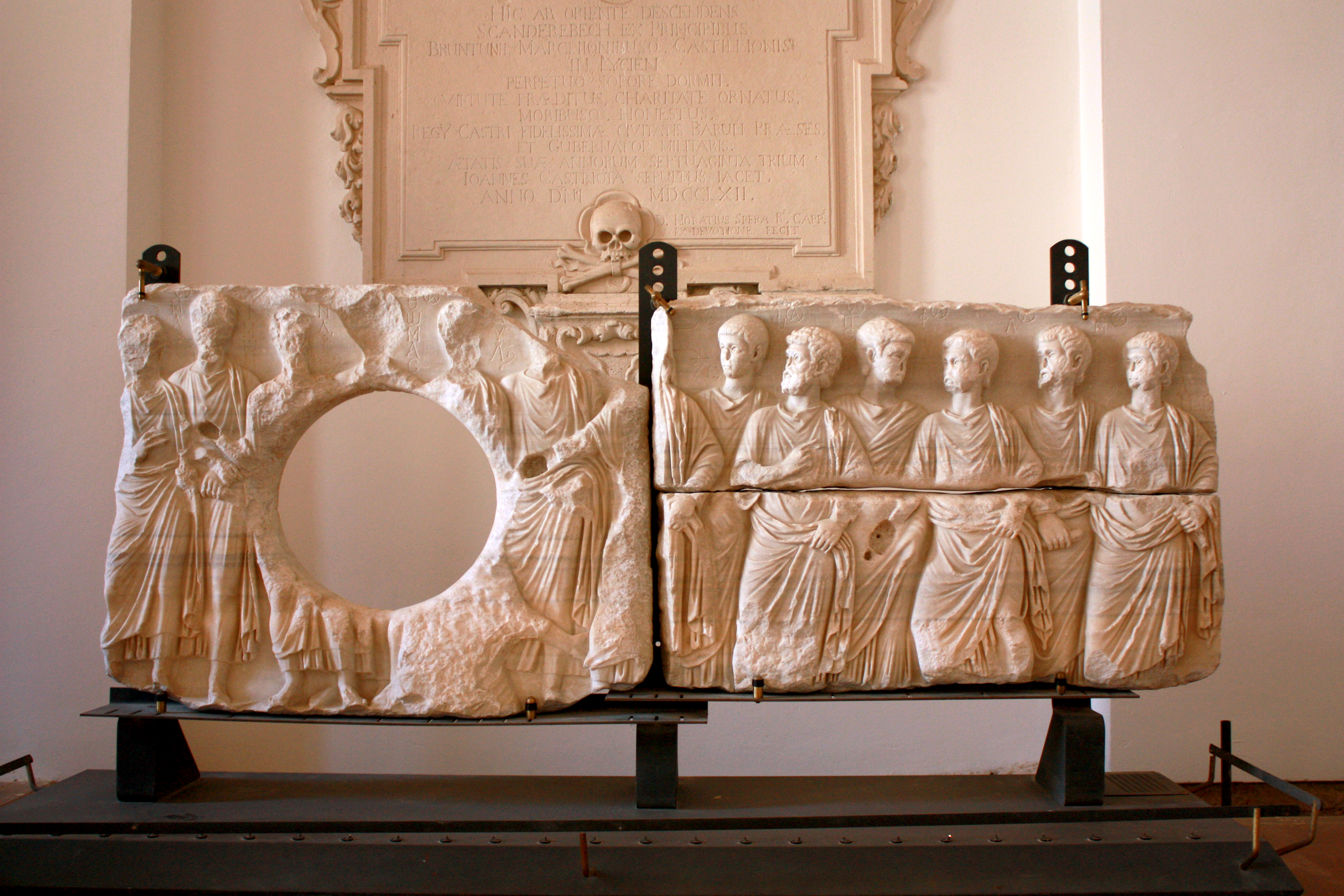
Il Sarcofago degli Apostoli

The Sarcophagus of the Apostles constitutes the oldest evidence of the Christian religion in Barletta. Stored at the lapidarium on the ground floor of the castle, it is a stone slab 87 centimeters in height, 216 in length and 10 in thickness, divided into three blocks, one of which is drilled in the center because of its use as the upper closure of a well. Found in Barletta in 1887, among the stones of the destroyed church of St. Eligius, it dates to the period between the late 3rd and early 5th centuries. In the middle is the figure of Christ, deprived of his head and particularly damaged since it is placed right at the point of the slab's tripartition. Near Jesus is a kneeling woman, while on either side are the apostles, divided into two large groups of six on each side. On the side of each male character an engraving allows his likeness to be recognized.

=== Interior ===
==== The entrance hall and chapel ====
Past the portal, one enters a covered atrium with an ogival vault. In this room there is a plaque, placed under a shield identifiable as that of Charles V, on which is the Latin inscription:

Carolus Quintus imperator romanorum semper augustus MCCCCCXXVII
Charles V, emperor of the Romans ever august. 1527

—Latin inscription on the castle entrance wall.

This inscription would recall the sovereign's visit to the building during the construction works.

To the right of the covered entrance hall, there is secondary access to the room that has housed the "Sarcophagus of the Apostles" and other stone material since 1988, and which during the 16th century must have constituted the ancient Angevin chapel, dedicated to the Blessed Sacrament, with adjoining rooms used for liturgical functions. The main entrance to the ancient ecclesiastical premises, tripartite by means of the central door and the two side windows, is still established under the arcades of the south front of the courtyard. Catholic rites were celebrated in the small church, having parish title, from 1669 to 1822, when it was decommissioned and deconsecrated.

To the left of the ogival-roofed atrium is the arched entrance to the courtyard and, in the adjacent room, the library.

==== The courtyard ====
The hub around which the entire castle structure is articulated is the courtyard, almost square in shape with sides of about thirty-five meters. In its centerline, with a north-south orientation, there are two visible wells, under which there are as many cisterns. As evidence of the ancient Angevin palatium, during the restoration, a three-meter wide cavity wall was built immediately beyond the wall facing the sea, about thirteen meters long and seven meters high. This was then covered with a reinforced concrete slab in which a hole about fifty centimeters long and as wide as the cavity wall was drilled, protected by a metal grating that allows daylighting, rainwater runoff, and a view from above of the portion of the boundary wall of the ancient fortress, remodeled following the Spanish intervention. Access to this room is also provided by the staircase leading to the castle's basement, leaning against the eastern front, at the end of which there is on the right the entrance to the underground floor and on the left the entrance to the cavity wall.

The west front is marked by five round arches, about four meters wide, leading to as many rooms, all communicating with each other. These, prior to the restoration, turned out to be buffered to go along with the use of the castle premises as a prison. Leaning against the western wall is a flight of steps that leads on one side to the 16th-century monumental staircase and the first-floor rooms on the western side, which since November 30, 2010 have housed the museum hub of the Civic Museum, while on the other leads to the first-floor rooms on the southern side.

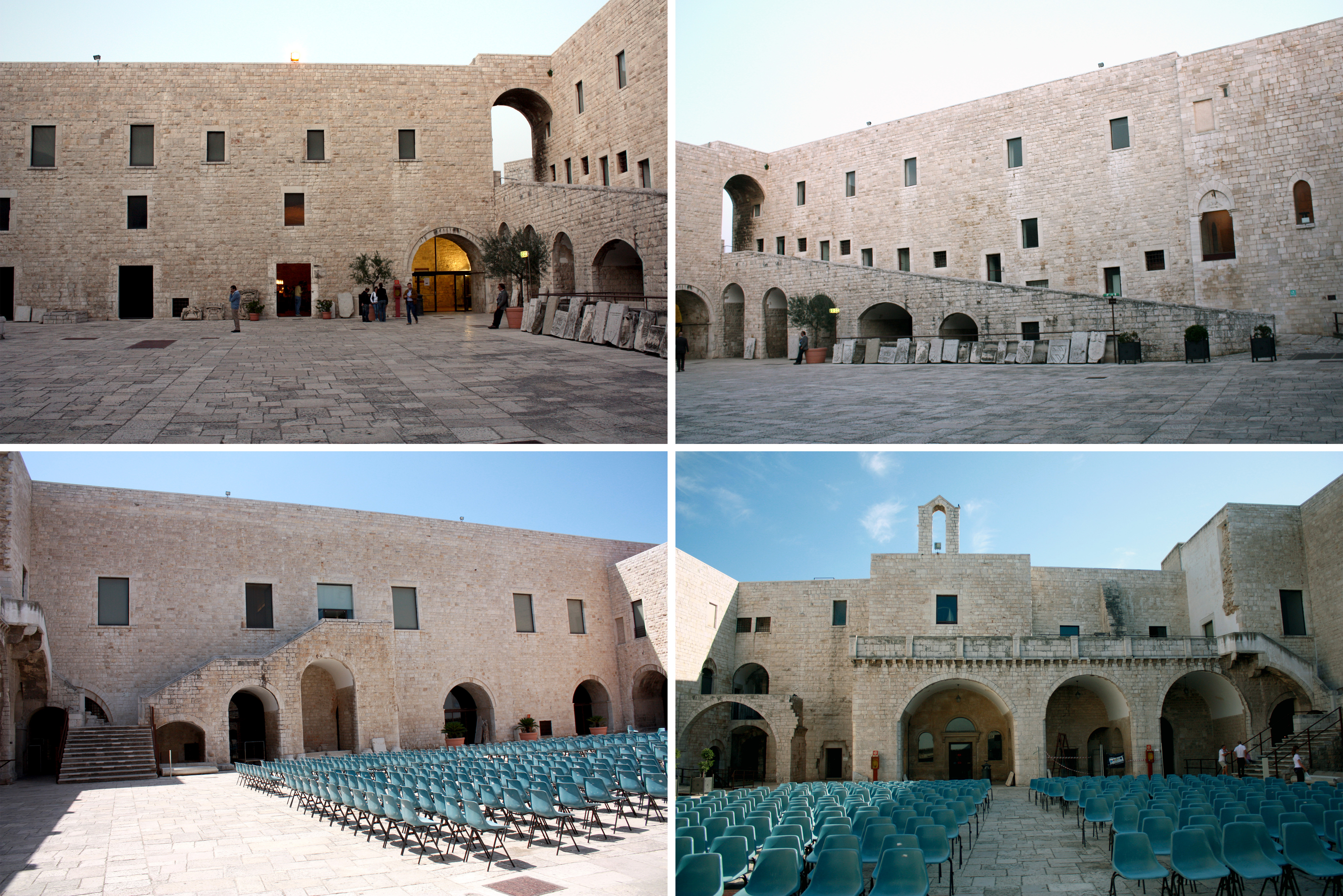
From top left clockwise, the interior elevations: north, east, south, west.

The north front is enclosed at the ends by two arches, similar to those on the west elevation, between which are three rectangular openings, providing access to the rooms of the north arm, which are also all communicating with each other and at the same time connected with the west side by a corner room located to the northwest. The elevation is entirely marked by a succession of openings of different sizes placed at different heights. At the east end orthogonally to the north facade there is a long staircase, uncovered all the way up except on the final appendage at the north front where it is covered by a round arch, leading to the rooms on the east side and to the roof plane. On the left side of the staircase is the access ramp to the basement and the sea wall of the Angevin palatium.

The east front presents, for almost its entire length, the imposing staircase for access to the terrace. This is punctuated by five arches of progressively increasing width from north to south and decreasing height. On a lower perspective plane runs a parapet that protects from the underlying flight of stairs that provides access from the courtyard to the basement. The eastern facade is divided horizontally into two parts of avowedly different workmanship: the southernmost one dates from the Swabian-Angevin period, with the presence of the Frederician domus; the remaining portion to the north denounces more distinctly Spanish features. The distinction is accentuated not only by the use of stone material of different shape, size, and rough-hewn, but also by the positioning of the masonry dating from the 13th century on a slightly more advanced plane than the later one by about two centuries. Confirmation of the Swabian matrix of this front is also given by the presence of a monofora and a bifora, both on the second floor, provided with a lunette with the Swabian eagle carved on it, the only example along with the one present in the castle of Bari. What was once the former home of Frederick, since the castle was returned to the city following the restorations in the 1980s, has become the seat of the municipal library, located at a lower level than the courtyard level, which is accessed by a staircase built during the restorations.

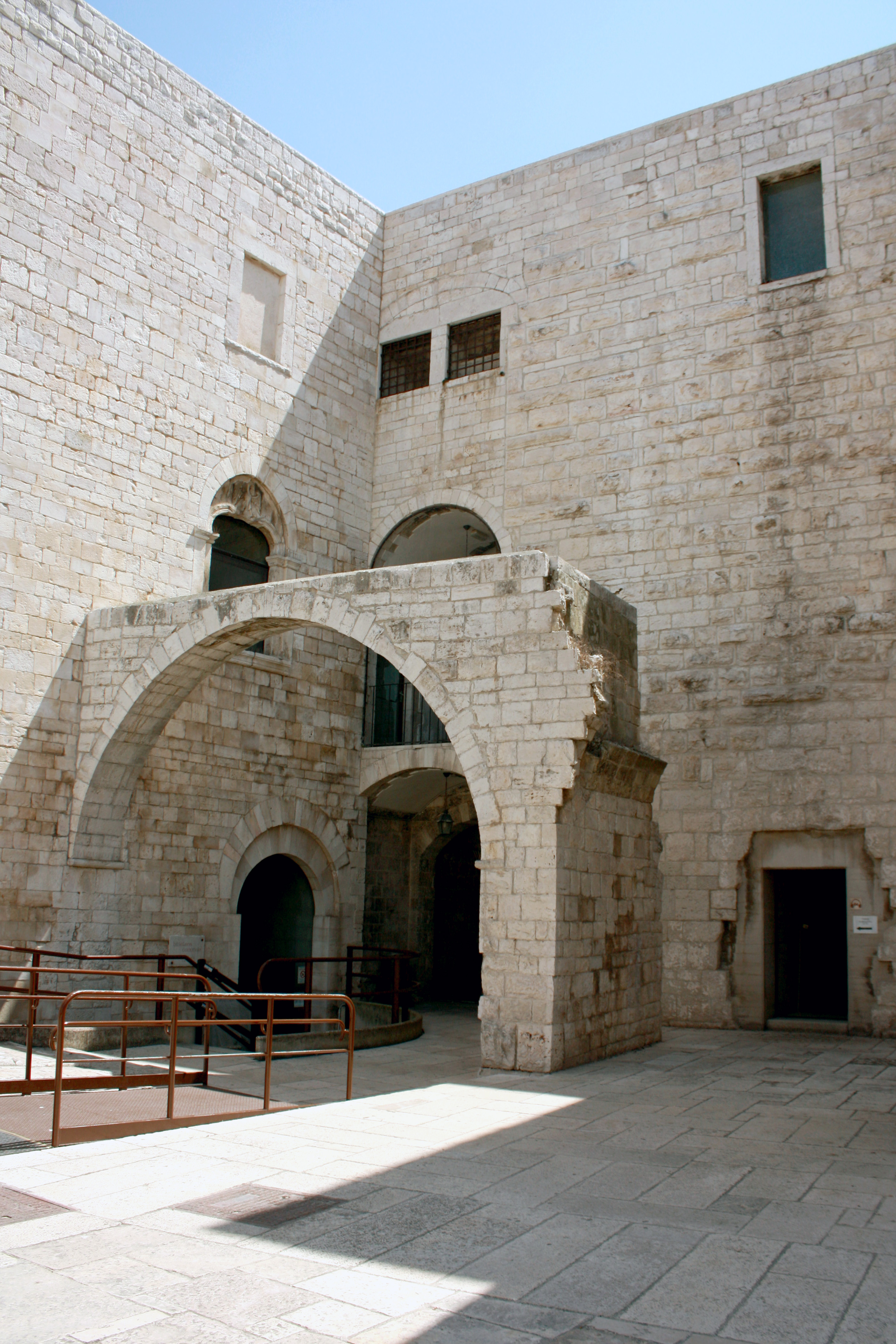
The severed arch between the south and east (Swabian) fronts. At right is the entrance from the courtyard to the Norman tower; at left is the descent to the entrance of the municipal library.

The south front appears to have a particularly heterogeneous development. In the easternmost portion of the wall it presents: a round-arched opening set above another lowered arch, surmounted by two additional windows facing a stairwell whose space during the 16th century had been used as an entrance to the castle; the ancient Norman tower whose interior is visible through an opening on the courtyard level; on a level further back toward the center of the courtyard is a wide round-arched arch that, before the restorations, connected through another arch to the portico leading to the exit. The precarious structural condition of the connecting arch caused it to be demolished, leaving the trace of its former existence by not completing the portion of the arch from which the shutter of the demolished structure departed. Proceeding westward, a triple archway makes a portico and supports the upper balcony. Through the first archway there is access to what was once the chapel; from the second archway one glimpses a hole in the axis of the entrance portal to the castle; the third archway sees the presence of a milestone column of the Via Traiana, coming from Cannae and transferred to the castle of Barletta since 1820, which has an epigraph engraved on a limestone cippus that reads:

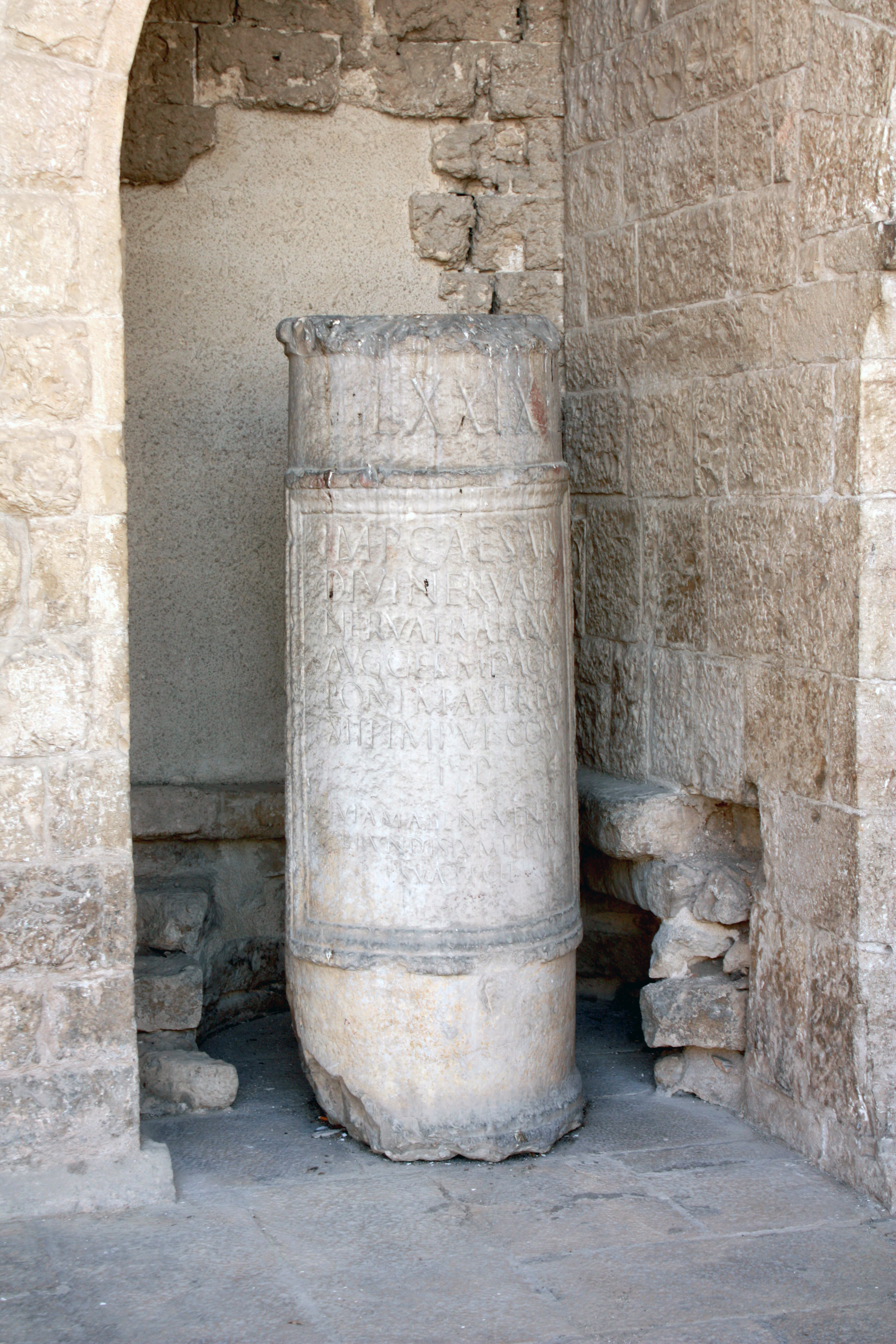
Cornerstone of Cannae.

LXXIX

Imp(erator). Caesar

divi Nervae f(ilius)

Nerva Traianus

Aug(ustus). Germ(anicus). Dacic(us).

pont(ifex). max(imus). tr(ibunicia). pot(estate).

XIII imp(erator). VI co(n)S(ul). V

p(ater). p(atriae).

viam a Benevento

Brundisium pecun(ia).

sua fecit.
"79,000 steps from Benevento Emperor Caesar,

son of the divine Nerva,

Nerva Trajan,

Augustus Germanicus Dacicus,

pontifex maximus,

13 times invested with tribunician power,

6 times acclaimed emperor,

5 times consul,

father of the fatherland,

with his own money built the road

from Benevento to Brindisi."

—Latin inscription present on the milestone column.

==== The ground floor ====
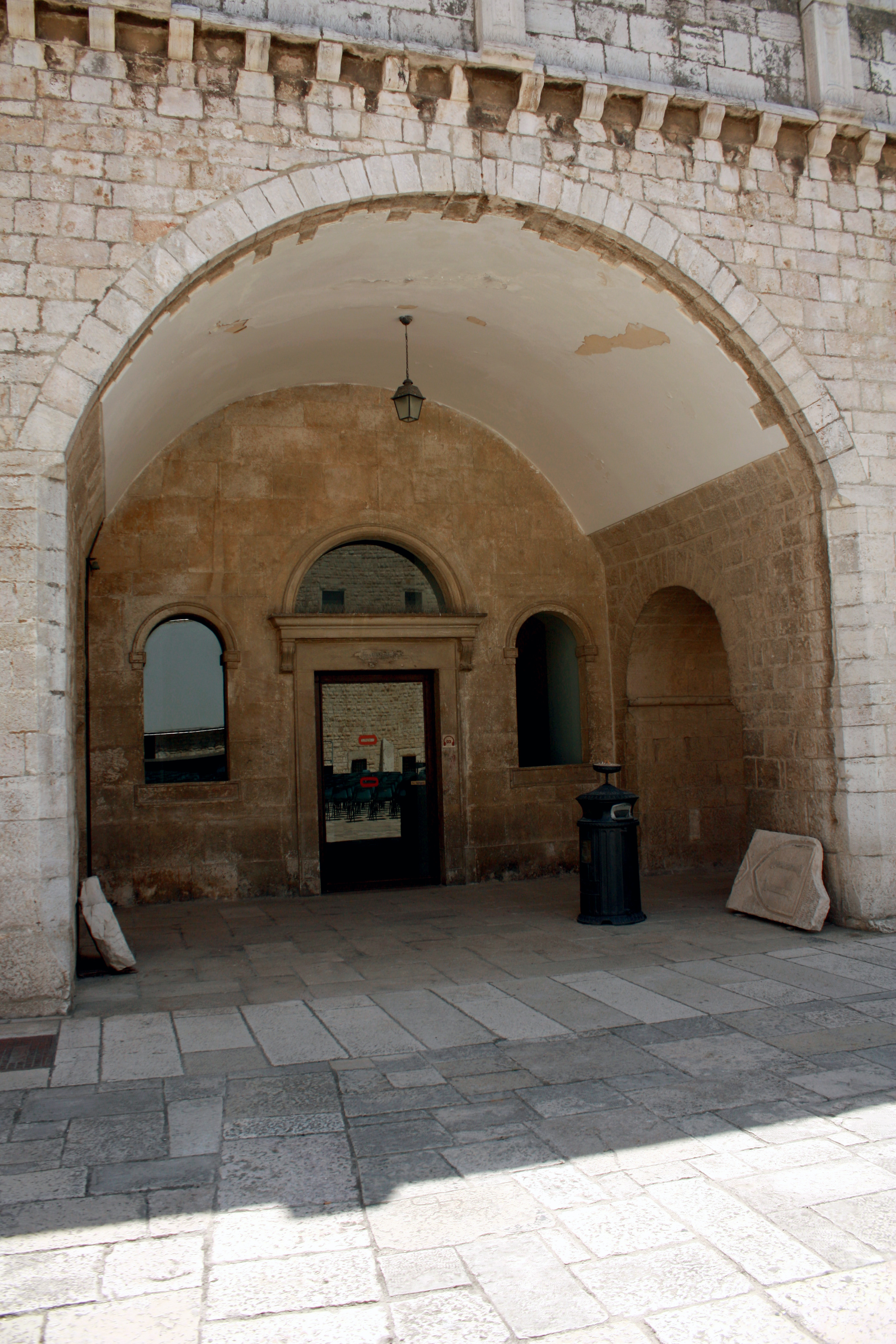
The entrance to the chapel on the south front.

The courtyard houses the distribution spaces that allow the arrival to the upper floors and the descent to the basement: the first level can be accessed through the double staircase leaning against the west front, while the underground level can be reached either through the staircase placed parallel to the east front, or by following the staircase, located under the porch of the southern side, discovered during the restoration work in the 1980s.

From the courtyard there is access to the northeast to a room that leads, via a narrow corridor on a slight slope, to a large circular room covered by a canopy and pierced in the middle by a circular skylight: this is the convention hall known as the Red Room inside the casemate of St. Anthony. An additional oculus is present in the middle of the hall and allows a glimpse of the room below. A similar conformation is found, in a mirror-image fashion, both in the northwest corner room that allows the entrance to the circular hall on the ground floor of the St. Vincent bastion, and in the southwest room that by means of a walkway excavated in the rock during restoration work in the 1980s, connects with the St. Mary bastion. From the courtyard floor, descending in elevation for about 1.30 meters, one enters the Swabian-Angevin wing to the southeast. The connection with the related circular casemate is not direct as for the other three bastions, but mediated by a helical staircase specially built during the 1980s restoration work, drilling a circular hole in the upper floor and thus allowing, from the latter, access by descending slightly in elevation to the current reading room of the municipal library.

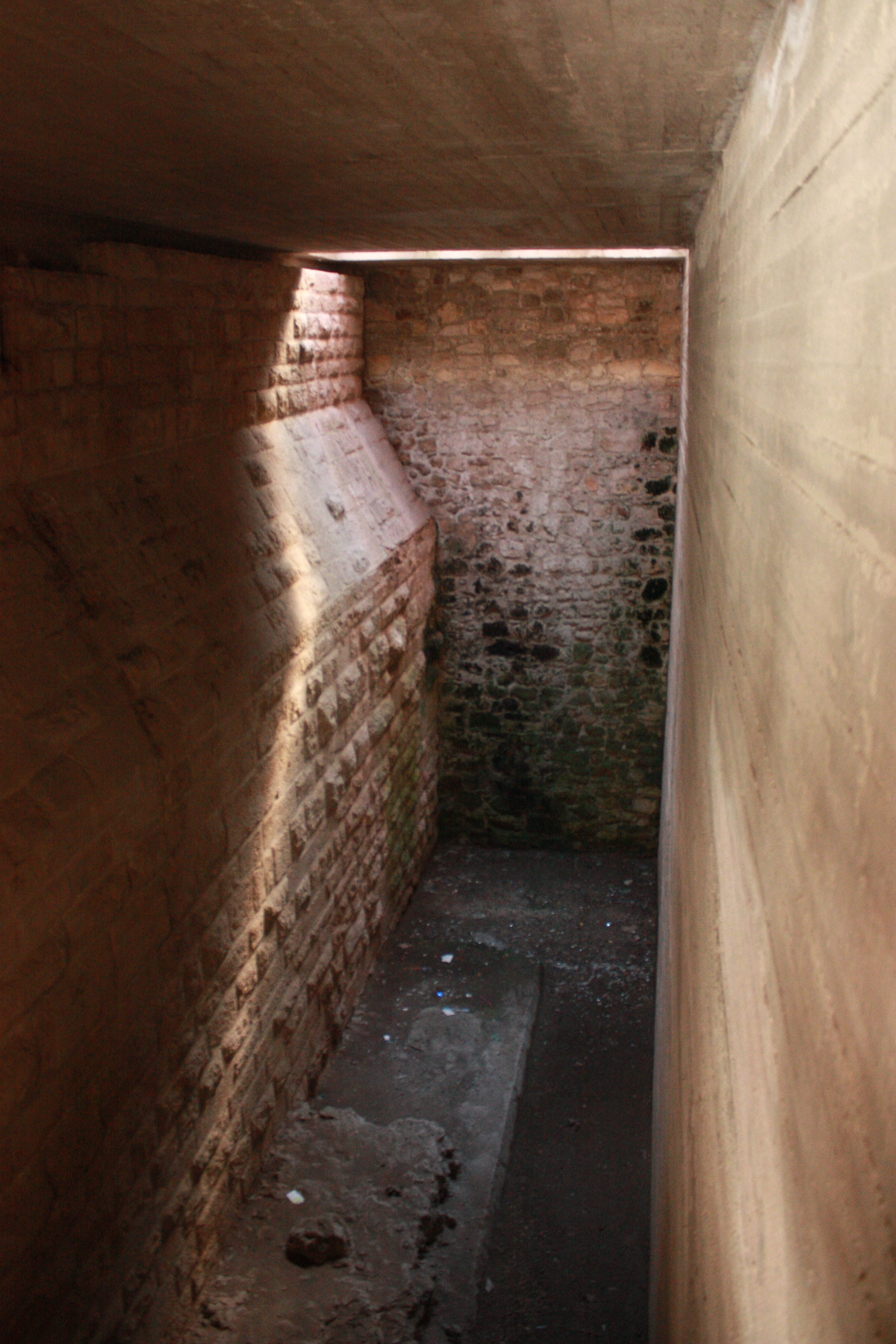
Sea wall of the ancient Angevin palatium.

==== The dungeons ====
It is possible to access the dungeons through two staircases located in the courtyard: one on the east side, parallel to the monumental staircase leading to the terrace, and the other on the south side. The latter was discovered through an analysis of the eighteenth-century model made by Giovanni Carafa, duke of Noja, during restoration work. During the descent from the east, on the other hand, it is possible to appreciate the sea wall of the Angevin palatium, while still further down there is the entrance to one of the cisterns present under the courtyard-floor.

Once in the dungeon from the staircase on the east side one finds oneself in a vestibule that leads on the right to the casemate of the bastion of St. Anthony, on the left to the northern arm of the dungeon. The casemate has a circular plan and a canopy roof with an oculus in the center, reminiscent of the opening made in the roof of the Pantheon. The only exception to the plan of the corner rooms of the ramparts is the lower casemate of the bastion connected to the Frederician domus, to the southeast, whose sides follow the outer ones with a pentagonal plan.

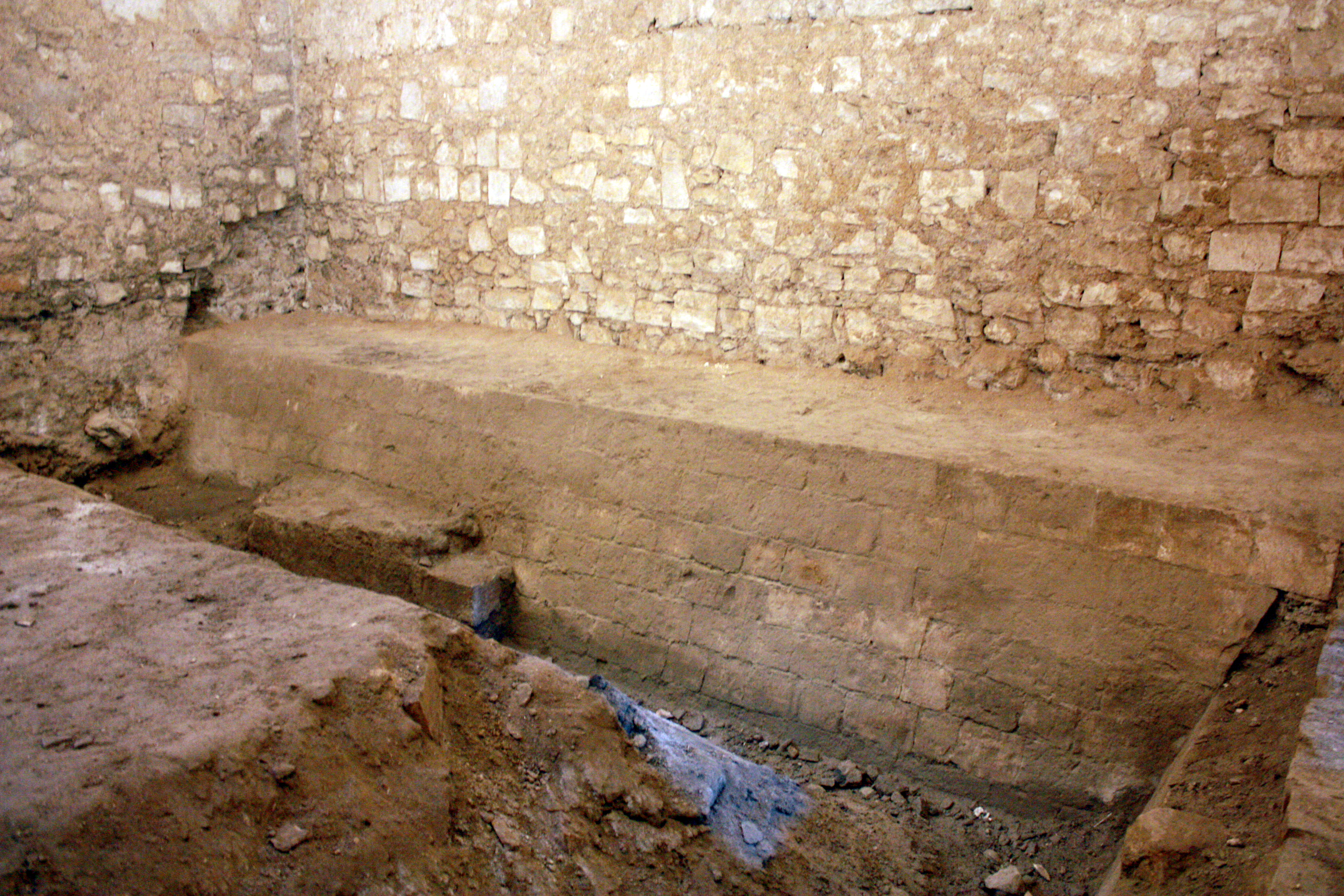
Fragment of the outer curtain of the Angevin palatium

The vestibule leads to the northern area of the castle, divided into five rooms, all communicating with each other, rectangular in shape; in the second room it is possible to glimpse an exit to the sea equipped with a slipway for pulling boats inside the structure, following restoration protected with metal gratings and used as an entrance for disabled people. This leads to the casemate of the St. Vincent bastion, located to the northwest. Like the other bastions, the latter is also equipped with splayed embrasures. It continues by passing another corridor, in the middle of which it is possible to notice the foundations of a section of the breakwater wall belonging to the outer curtain of the ancient Angevin palace, which was found during the restorations.

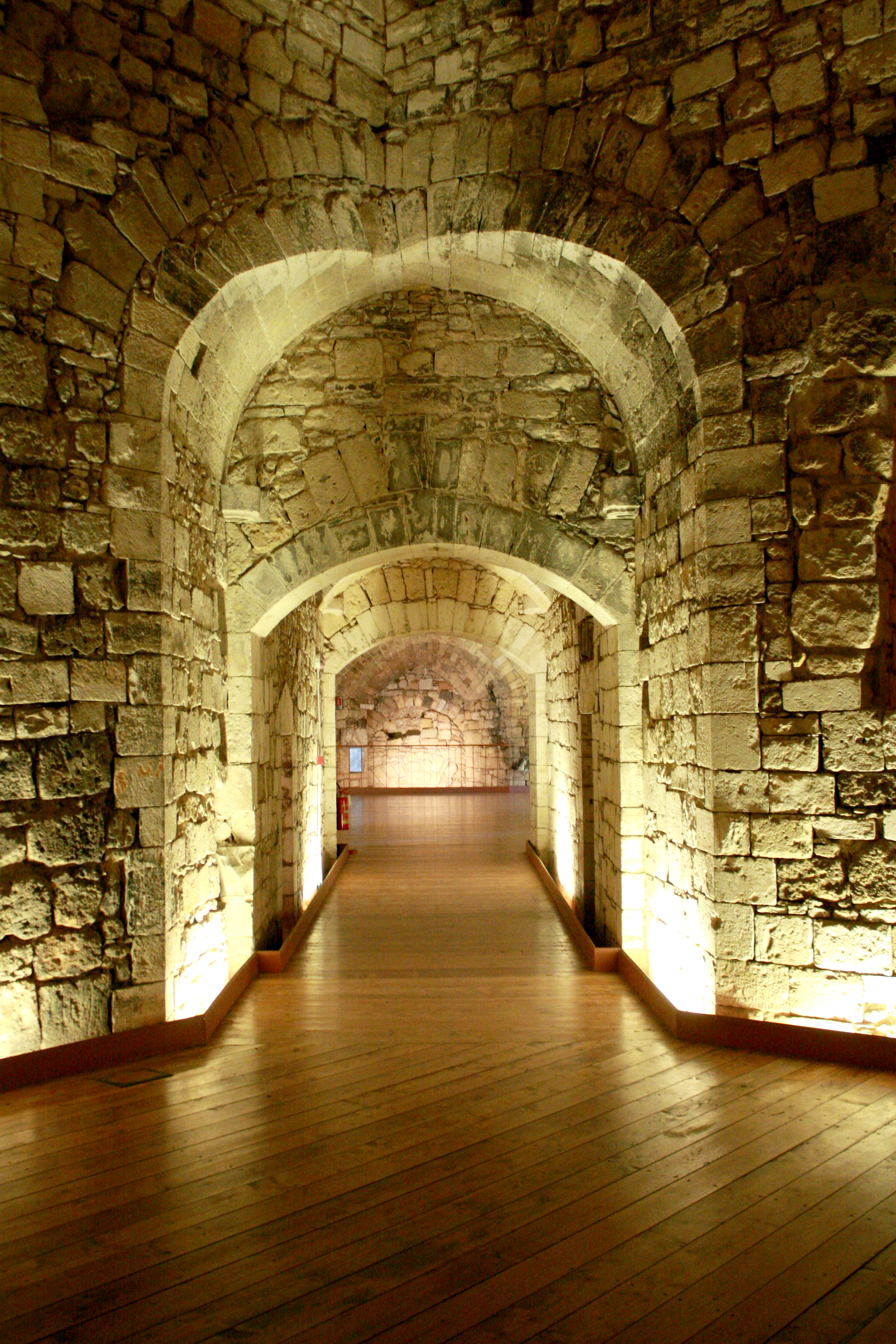
The dungeons: corridor leading northeastward to the bastion of St. Anthony

The historic route would lead, once the west side of the dungeons was completed, to take the short walkway to the south to the staircase that allows one to ascend to the courtyard floor. The lower casemate of St. Mary's, the one to the southwest, at the Co-cathedral of St. Mary Major, thus presents the absence of an original direct connection to the dungeons with the rest of the castle. It thus turns out to be historically isolated from the rest of the structure, and even the restoration was unable to locate either an access from the courtyard-floor entrance or from the southwest corner compartment present on the lower level, as is the case with all the other bastions, so much so that during the work a descent to the lower level was forcibly made to allow visitors access. Inside, just below the floor level, the foundation structure of the ancient Angevin round tower was found, with an external reinforcing buttress inclined to a scarp, used in the past as a cistern, and left exposed after the work of architect Grisotti.

Like the bastion of Santa Maria, the bastion of the Annunziata, located at the Frederician domus to the southeast, also appears to have no direct connections with the underground rooms, which instead end to the southwest. The hypotheses put forward following the restoration have suggested that there was less need for defense on the sides of the fortress facing the city, which led the Spaniards not to intervene on the two underground rooms facing south, especially since the bastion of the Annunziata is in any case connected to the courtyard level by a very steep staircase with two trunks placed at right angles, which starts from inside the domus. Confirming the uniqueness of this area of the castle, the basement floor of this bastion is the only one to have a pentagonal plan, thus following the conformation of the outer fronts, while the upper floor resumes the circular shape ending with a calotte and its central oculus. This difference is due to the recovery of the structure of an earlier ravelin, placed at this very edge of the castle, along with the discovery of an edge of the basement of the outer wall of the Angevin fortress.

Following restoration in the 1980s, the entire floor of the dungeon was characterized by an earthen floor and numerous splayed holes with no fixtures, keeping the original image of the underground level almost unchanged. Further restoration work was completed in May 2009, which allowed the arrangement of the flooring of the east and north wings by affixing a wooden stave that made the area easy, enabling its musealization. Since then, the north wing has been home to the display of the medieval and modern part of the lapidary with coats of arms, tombstones and inscriptions arranged along the walls of the rooms. From May 16 to August 30, 2009, the basement hosted the contemporary art exhibition "Intramoenia Extra Art," under the scientific direction of Achille Bonito Oliva, aimed at enhancing not only the works on display but also the monument that was the site of the exhibition.

==== The upper floors ====
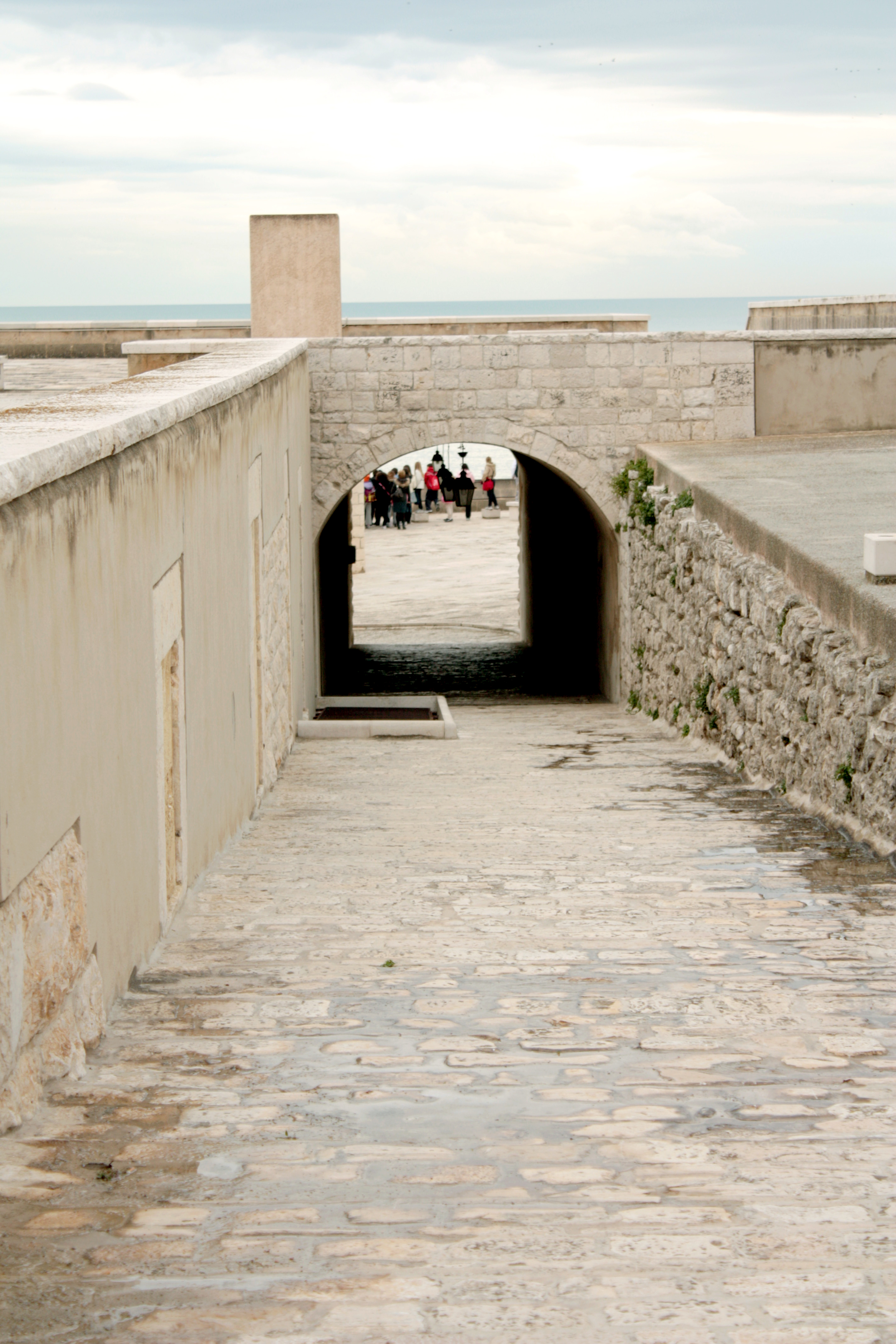
The access ramp to the castle roof deck.

The second floor can be divided into two mutually separate parts: that of Swabian-Angevin features, to the southeast, which can be accessed from the monumental staircase leaning against the eastern side, which leads directly into the rooms, or from the staircase located at the access to the castle dating back to the 16th century, or even from the iron spiral staircase made in the reception area of the municipal library, and the Spanish part, comprising the entire remaining area of the castle, which can be reached through the grand staircase located behind the western elevation or from the staircase to the east heading toward the rooms located to the north.

The western wing is characterized by a regular geometry with rooms communicating with each other in succession through holes that make the scanning of the pathway visible in perspective. In contrast to the military nature of the rest of the fortress, this area has more markedly civilian features, with a reception hall, 20 meters long, 9 meters wide and 8 meters high, in which there is a large fireplace and larger rooms. Historical documentation has made it possible to hypothesize that the rooms were used as soldiers' quarters. These rooms, together with those on the north side, have housed the museum center with the permanent collections of Gabbiani, Immesi and Ricci since April 30, 2010.

Passing the first succession of steps of the "grand staircase" to the west and ascending further through a small staircase leaning against the south side, one enters the rooms of the southern front. Connected to the reception rooms of the west wing, they are a continuation of them for civilian use, as evidenced by the presence of a chimney, the only example in the entire fortress of a hearth extradosed to the masonry.

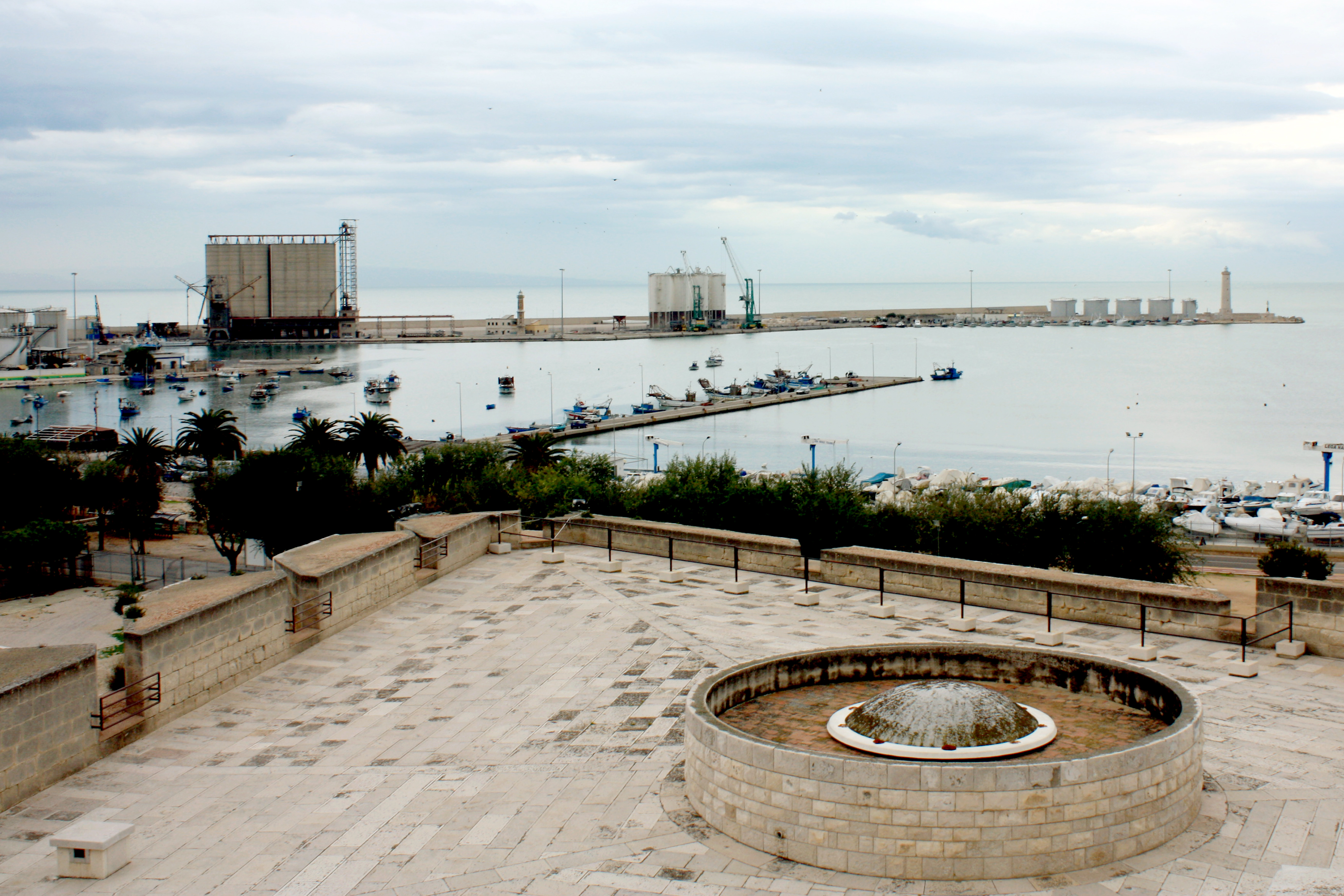
The terrace of the bastion of St. Vincent with, in the foreground, the restored skylight and in the background the harbor of Barletta.

In the east wing, the Frederician wing, are the rooms used as the reading room of the municipal library and the offices of the administrative staff. The entire wing is covered by a pointed arch vault, with a chimney carved into the wall on the southern front. The second floor covering is accessible through the staircase leaning against the east wall of the courtyard, which leads to the terrace of the northern curtain wall. The staircase continues by rotating 180 degrees, until it reaches the second floor covering. Along this staircase, covered for the first section by a round-headed vault that follows the inclination of the flight of stairs, there is a slit in the floor covered by a metal grating that allows one to observe the diversity between the eastern Frederician wall and the Spanish encasement. The second floor covering covers all the remaining curtain walls and, passing the southern arm, allows one to arrive at the bomb disposal laboratory, located along the west side.

Prior to the restorations of the 1980s, the roofs were in a precarious condition from the point of view of both conservation and safety, due on the one hand to neglect, and on the other hand to the degradation of numerous superelevations without historical foundation, which followed one another until the beginning of the 20th century. Thus, the roofing planes were rebuilt with the waterproofing of all horizontal surfaces and the repositioning of the paving stones, both on the ramparts and on the side curtain walkways.

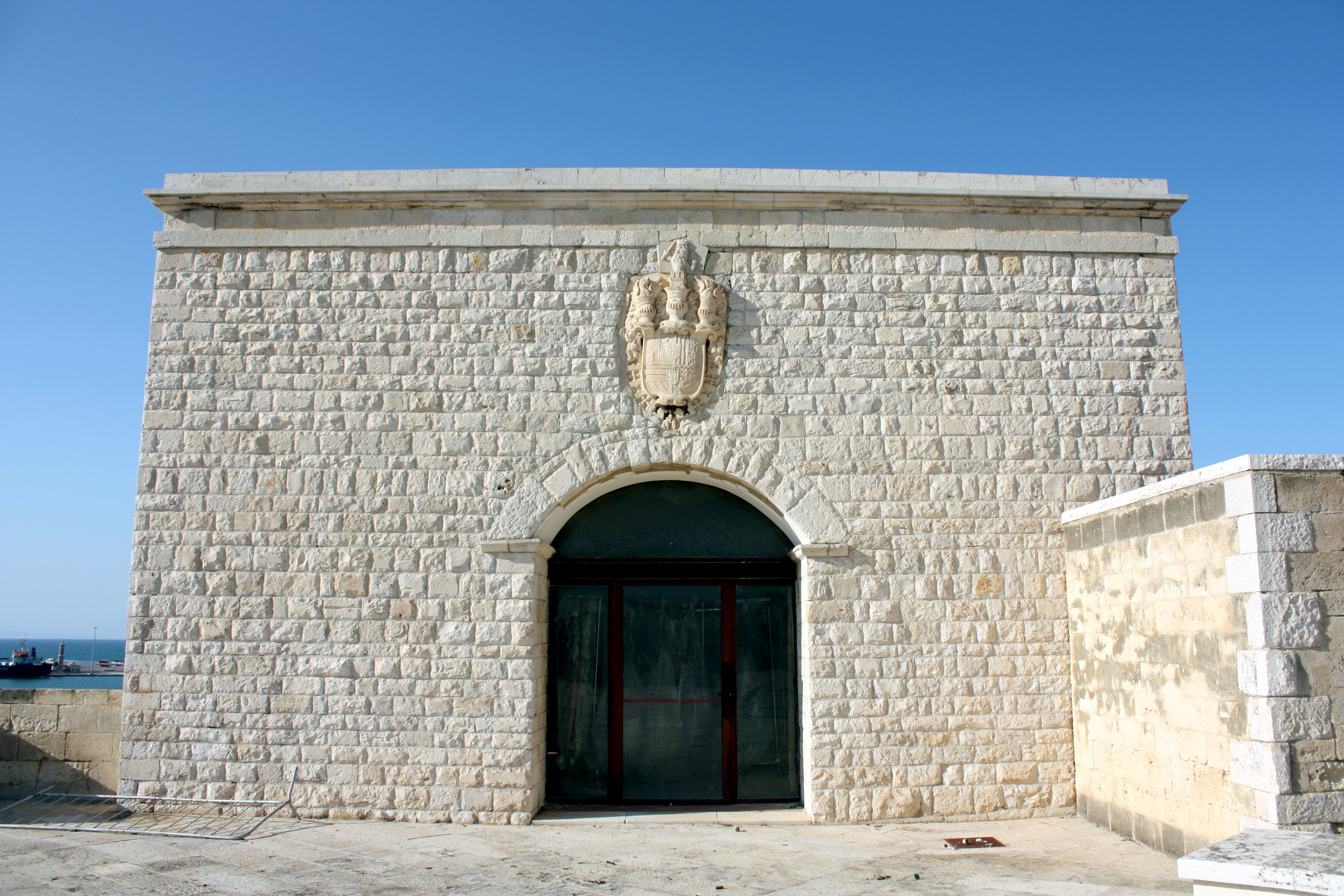
The main front of the Bombmaker's Workshop.

The bastions of the Annunziata and St. Vincent's also had centrally located emerging structures covered with tiles that allowed ventilation and illumination of the upper casemates, while at the same time allowing rainwater to enter from the sides. In this regard, the restoration included the replacement of the previous elements visible from the outside of the castle with less invasive structures that would improve lighting, making it zenithal, and allow rainwater to drain away.

Along the western curtain wall of the roof plane is an imposing structure, the main front of which is characterized by a rough-hewn stone wall with a large central opening above which towers a Spanish coat of arms, dating back to 1620, provided with a paved roofing that resurfaced during restoration work. This is the headwall of the "bomb-makers' workshop," whose construction work began on June 3, 1621. By this date the work on the completion of the castle had been, for the most part, completed, so it seems strange to start the construction of this body of the building, in a position well in view from the sea and from possible enemy attacks; it appears even less justified if one thinks of the purpose of the room, suitable for housing gunpowder and other explosive material. It is therefore thought that the building of this hall was due to the Spaniards' desire to give luster to the castle, at a time when the structure was no longer part of the economic and military interests of the time.

== The castle in mass culture ==
The castle has been lent several times to cinematography for the making of a number of films, including:

- The Gospel According to St. Matthew (1964) by Pier Paolo Pasolini;
- Otello (1986) by Franco Zeffirelli;
- The Knights of the Quest (2001) by Pupi Avati.

Since 1992, the municipal library, named after Sabino Loffredo, has been located in the southeastern wing of the castle of Barletta, in many of the rooms that were once home to the Frederician domus. (Note: The naming took place, by resolution of the City Council, on May 1, 1903, when it was still located on the main floor of the Curci Theater.) It is accessed from the courtyard, descending a flight of stairs that covers a difference in height of about one meter.

The castle and moat to the north are home to large and small cultural events, lectures and musical concerts. Notable events include the annual Novello al Castello food and wine festival, with seminars and lectures on the local wine industry, and the contemporary art exhibition "Intramoenia Extra art," held as a one-time event from May 16 to August 30, 2009.

== See also ==
- Barletta
- Barletta Cathedral
- Capetian House of Anjou
- Crown of Aragon
- Spanish royal family
- Normans
- Hohenstaufen

== Bibliography ==
- Bacile da Castiglione, Gennaro (1978). Castelli pugliesi. Bologna: Forni Editore.
- D'Ercole, Maria Cecilia (1997). Il materiale lapideo del Castello di Barletta. Barletta: Museo Civico.
- Raffaele De Vita (a cura di) (1974). Il Castello di Barletta in "Castelli, torri ed opere fortificate di Puglia". Bari: Adda Editore.
- Grisotti, Marcello (1982). Il restauro del castello. Atti della conferenza cittadina sui beni culturali e ambientali di Barletta. Barletta: Adda.
- Grisotti, Marcello (1995). Barletta, il castello, la storia, il restauro. Bari: Adda.
- Houben, Hubert (2009). Federico II. Imperatore, uomo, mito. Bologna: Il Mulino.
- Loffredo, Sabino (1987). Storia della città di Barletta. Sala Bolognese: Forni.
- Mele, Domenico (1887). Annuario pugliese: edizione 1884 anno 3. Foggia: Pollice.
- Russo, Renato (1998). Le cento chiese di Barletta: dagli ordini mendicanti al XX secolo. Barletta: Rotas.
- Russo, Renato (2003). Il Castello di Barletta. La storia. Barletta: Rotas.
- Russo, Renato (2004). Barletta. La storia. Barletta: Rotas.
- Russo, Renato (2005). Guida al Castello di Barletta e ai suoi segreti. Barletta: Rotas.
- Sthamer, Eduard (1926). Dokumente zur Geschichte der Kastellbauten Kaiser Friedrichs II. und Karls I. von Anjou. Band II: Apulien und Basilicata (in German). Lipsia: Verlag Karl W. Hiersemann.
- Strappa, Giuseppe (1995). Unità dell'organismo architettonico. Bari: Dedalo.
- Strappa, Giuseppe (2005). Edilizia per il culto: chiese, moschee, sinagoghe, strutture cimiteriali. Torino: UTET.
- Vista, Francesco Saverio (1989). Note storiche sulla città di Barletta. Barletta: Papeo.
