= Pierre d'Angicourt =

French architect

Pierre d'Angicourt, in French Pierre de Angicourt, in Latin Petrus de Angicuria (Angicourt, ... - active between 1269 and 1309) was a French architect, for about thirty years at the service of Angevin kings of the Kingdom of Naples during the second half of the thirteenth century.

A knight and French feudal lord, he worked as Protomagister operum Curie and contributed to the spread of the French Gothic culture in southern Italy. Among other things attributed to him is the introduction of sloping fortification walls known as mura à scarpa and circular defensive towers in the restructuring of Angevin castles of southern Italy in the late thirteenth century.

Among the works attributed to him are

- the Lucera Cathedral,
- the project for the construction of Castel Nuovo, better known as Maschio Angioino, in Naples,
- the castle of Barletta, however, strongly altered during expansion by the Spaniards,
- the castle of Mola di Bari, modified in the following centuries,
- the construction of the choir of the Barletta Cathedral,
- the Neapolitan churches of San Domenico Maggiore, San Gennaro, St Eligius and San Lorenzo Maggiore
- the restoration of the castles of Trani, Canosa di Puglia, Brindisi, Manfrino and Lagopesole.

== Bibliography ==
- Maurizio Pasqua, Pierre d'Angicourt e l'architettura angioina del XIII secolo nel regno di Sicilia: tesi del dottorato di ricerca in storia dell'architettura e dell'urbanistica, coordinatore: Tommaso Scalesse; tutor: Marcello Salvatori; Università degli studi G. D'Annunzio Chieti; Facoltà di architettura di Pescara, Dipartimento di scienze, storia dell'architettura e restauro, 1999.
- Alexander Harper, Pierre d'Angicourt and Angevin Construction; Journal of the Society of Architectural Historians, Vol. 75 No. 2, June 2016; (pp. 140–157) DOI: 10.1525/jsah.2016.75.2.140

== See also ==
- Angevins
- Charles I of Naples
