= Colossus of Barletta =

Monument in Barletta, Italy

Coordinates: 41°19′9.45″N 16°16′53.34″E

- Colosso di Barletta
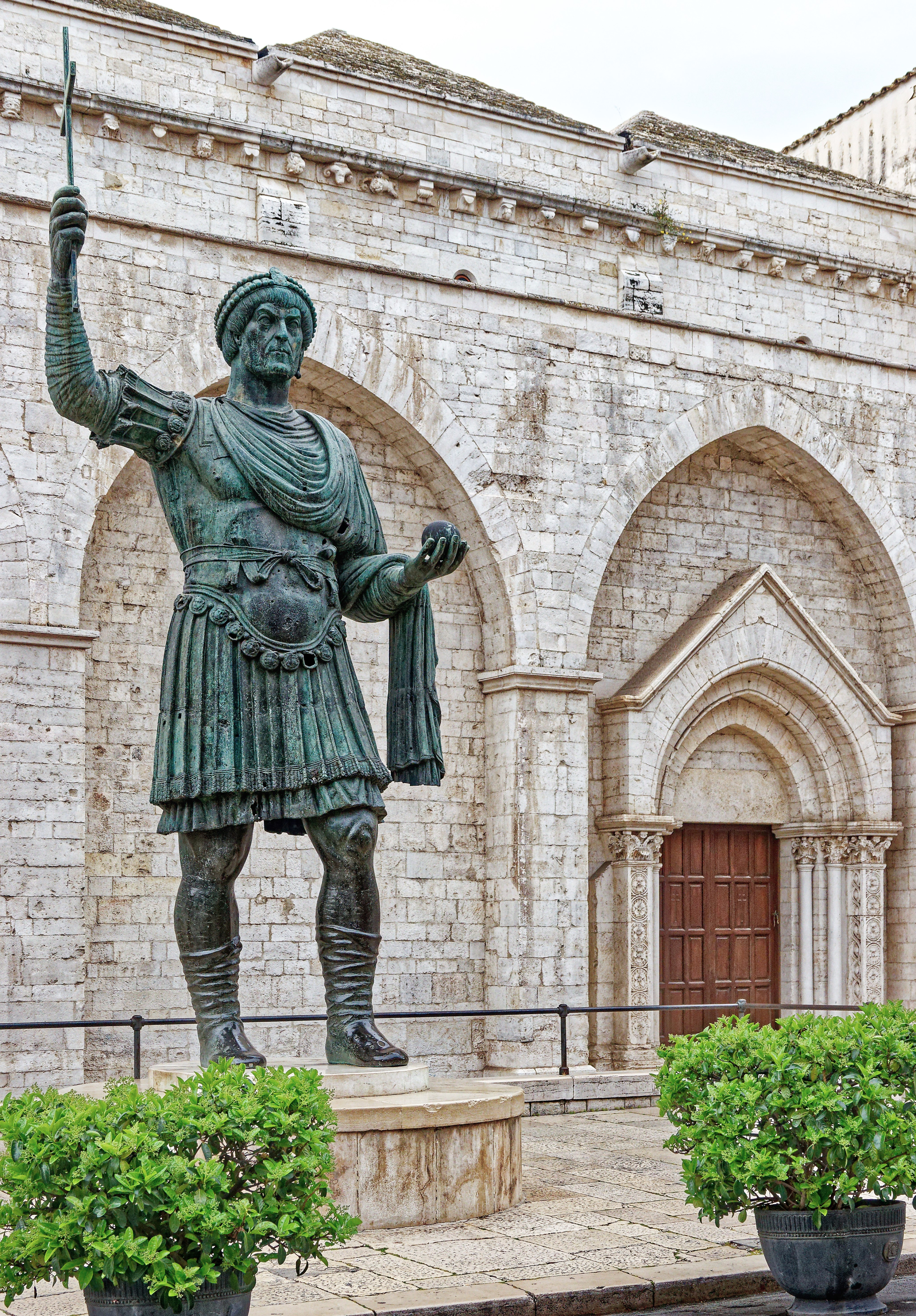
- The statue in 2021
- Interactive map of Colossus of Barletta
- Location: Corso Vittorio Emanuele, Barletta, Italy
- Material: bronze
- Height: 5 metres (16 ft)

The Colossus of Barletta is a large bronze statue of a Roman emperor, nearly three times life size (5.11 meters, or about 16 feet 7 inches), in the historic center of Barletta, Italy. It is a Late Antique statue, but the date, identity of the emperor, and the original location of the statue remain uncertain. Most datings are to the 5th or early 6th centuries, and many think it was made in Constantinople, and perhaps originally placed there. It is the largest Roman or Byzantine bronze statue to have survived essentially intact.

== History ==
The original location of the statue is unclear, but it was probably somewhere more important than Barletta, a small port on the Adriatic Sea. According to local legend, the statue supposedly washed up on the shore, after a Venetian ship sank returning from the Sack of Constantinople in the Fourth Crusade in 1204, but it is not impossible that the statue was sent to the West much earlier. The identity of the emperor is uncertain.

It is known that a colossal statue was discovered in 1231 during excavations commissioned by emperor Frederick II in Ravenna and it is possible that he had it transported to his southern Italian lands. Regardless, the first certain historical reference to the statue dates from 1309, when parts of its legs and arms were used by local Dominicans to cast bells. The artist Fabio Alfano did a partial restoration of the statue in 1431. The restored colossus was re-erected on 14 May 1491 in front of Church of the Holy Sepulchre (Barletta).

== Description ==
The figure evidently depicts an emperor due to his imperial diadem, beneath which the hair falls in rolls. He has a commanding gesture that invokes the act of delivering a speech, with his right arm raised. In his right hand, which originally held a spear or a labarum, later restorers inserted a cross. Over two tunics the emperor wears a cuirass, with pteruges, protective strips of cloth or leather, covering his shoulders and upper legs. His cloak is draped over his left arm in a portrait convention that goes back to Augustus. In his outstretched left hand he holds a small orb, another later addition to replace a larger original orb.

== Identity of the emperor ==
According to tradition, the statue depicts Heraclius (r. 610–641), though this is most unlikely on historical and art-historical grounds. Several alternative candidates have been proposed, ranging from Valentinian I (r. 364–375) to Justinian I (r. 527–565). Most modern scholars identify the emperor as either Marcian (r. 450–457), in which case it probably topped the Column of Marcian, or Leo I (r. 457–474), meaning it topped the Column of Leo, both columns in Constantinople. However, Marcian's column has been noted as being too small for the scale of the statue. The fact that the emperor is shown bearded has also been used to link it to Leo, although this identification is not always accepted.

== Gallery ==
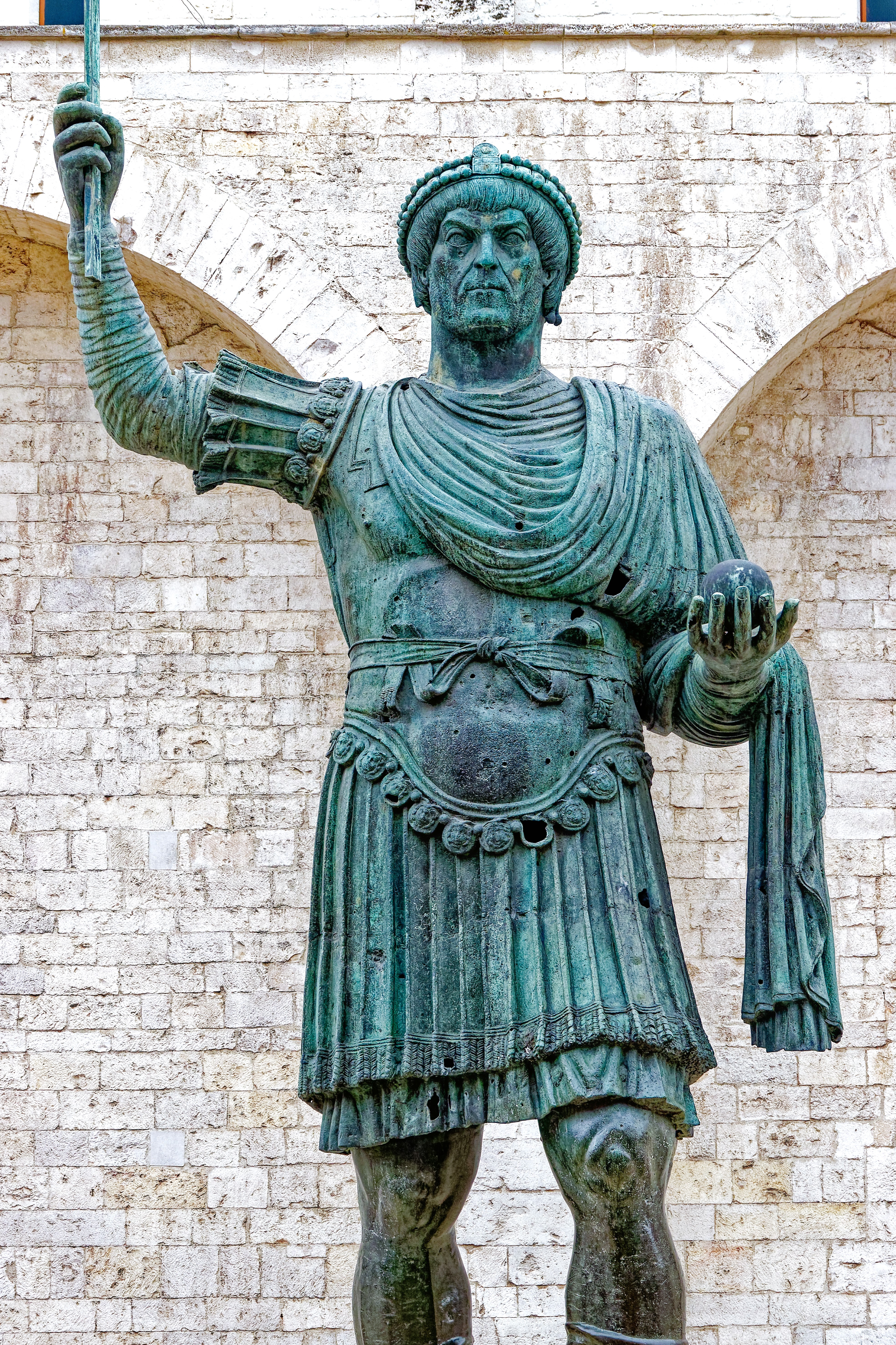
Front view of the statue

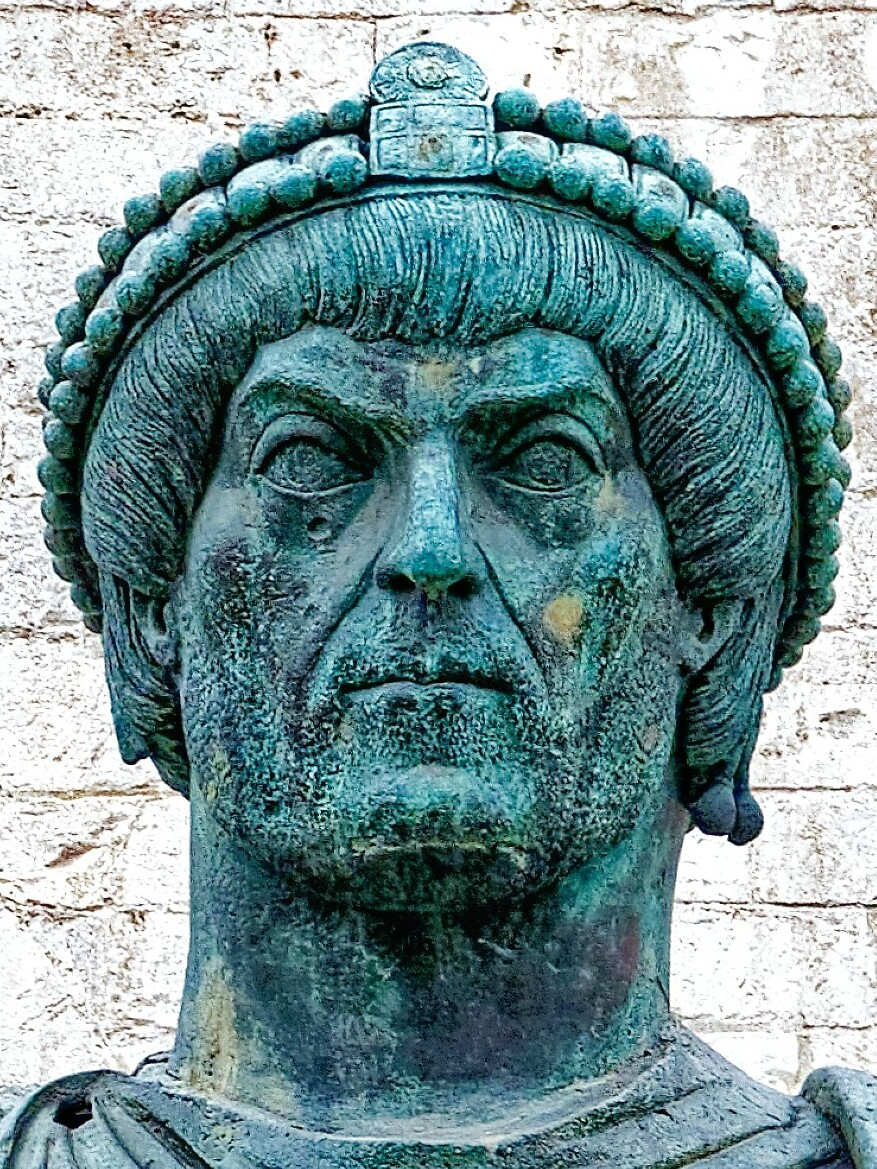
Detail of head

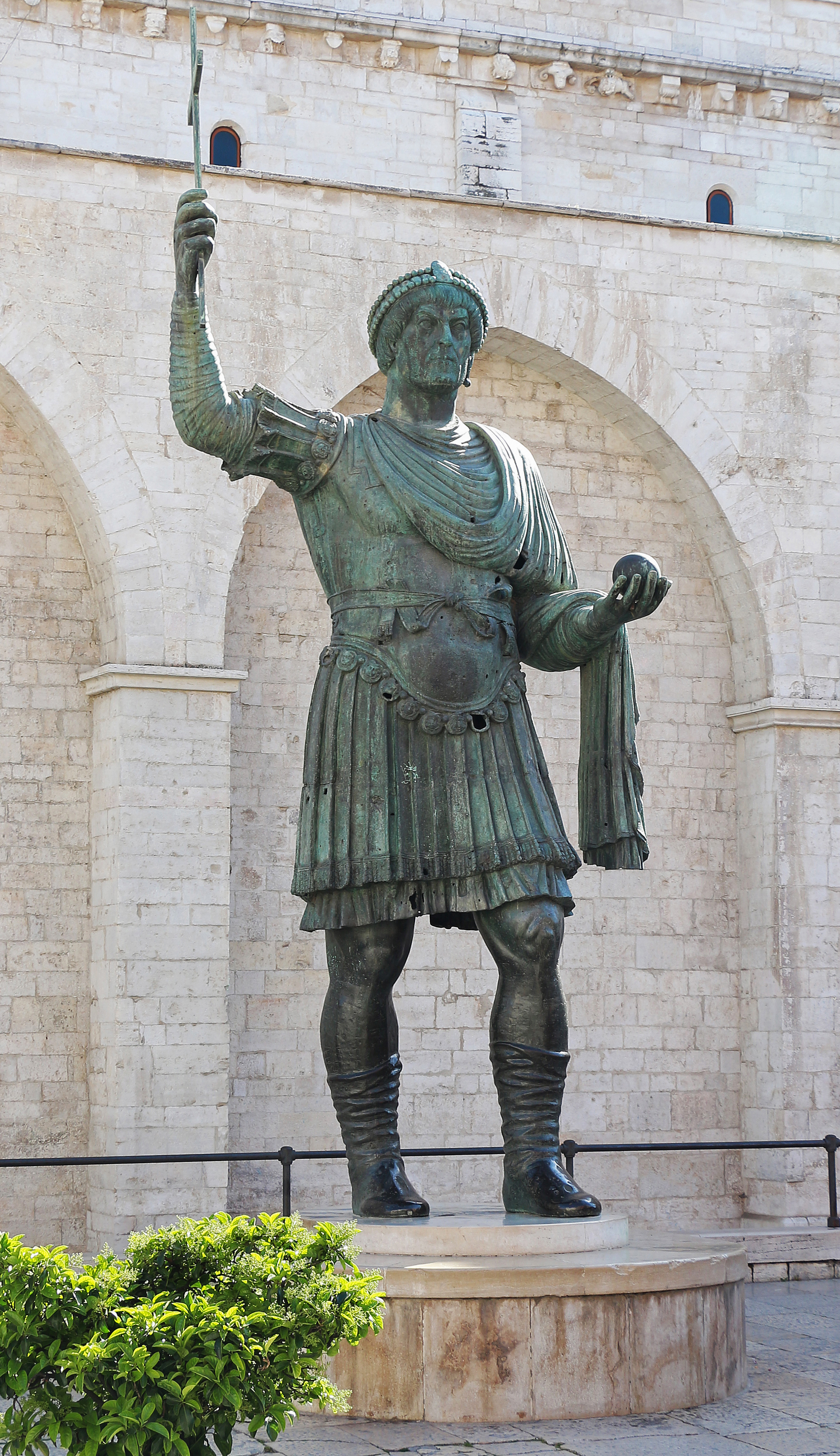
The statue from the right

== See also ==
- Regisole, a now lost equestrian statue originally from Ravenna.

== Sources ==
- Johnson, F. P. (1925). "The Colossus of Barletta". American Journal of Archaeology. 29 (1): 20–25. doi:10.2307/497716. ISSN 0002-9114. JSTOR 497716.
- Nicholson, Oliver (2018). The Oxford Dictionary of Late Antiquity. Oxford University Press. p. 214. ISBN 978-0-19-256246-3.
- "Discussion: Colossal bronze statue of emperor in cuirass. Probably from Constantinople (now in Barletta). Late fourth to fifth century [LSA-441]". Last Statues of Antiquity. University of Oxford.
- Kiilerich, Bente (2015). "The Barletta Colossus Revisited: The Methodological Challenges of an Enigmatic Statue". Acta Ad Archaeologiam et Artium Historiam Pertinentia. XXVIII: 55–72. doi:10.2307/497716. JSTOR 497716.
