= Pavia Revolt =

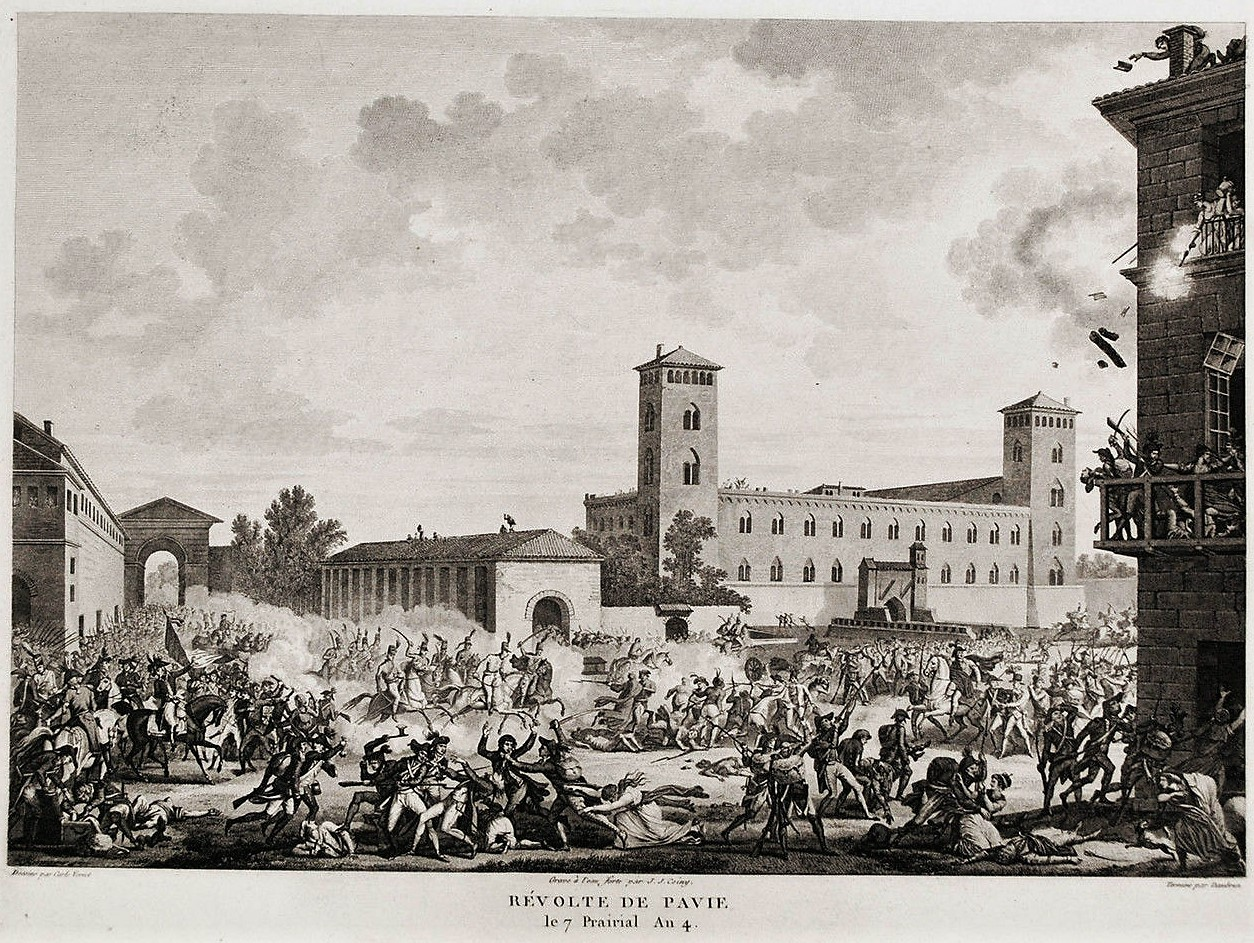
The revolt in Tableaux historiques des campagnes d'Italie, Paris, Auber, 1806.

The Pavia Revolt was an insurrection in Pavia in 1796 against French troops under Napoleon Bonaparte.

== Context ==
On 28 April 1796 the Armistice of Cherasco brought the war ever closer to Pavia, so much so that the University of Pavia was temporarily closed. On 10 May Bonaparte and his Army of Italy defeated the Austrians at the Battle of Lodi, opening their way into Austrian Lombardy. A key character in the battle was Pierre François Charles Augereau, who entered Pavia with 6,000 men on 14 May. He was welcomed by bishop Giuseppe Bertieri and the city council. Augereau saw how willing the local authorities were to collaborate with the French and so made no changes to its city government and guaranteed rights of religion and property.

However local Jacobins, guided by Giovanni Antonio Ranza, veteran of the Alba Republic, were unhappy with that, as were the working classes, who had long been subjected to anti-revolutionary propaganda from their Habsburg rulers, the local authorities and the clergy. Together they accused the bishop and city council of cowardice and on 16 May some local Jacobins - against the wishes of most of the rest of the population - tore down the Regisole statue from its plinth and replaced it with a Tree of Liberty. Thanks to Pietro Tamburini's intervention the bronze statue of Pope Pius V was spared the same fate. Augereau had set out for the front on 21 May, leaving behind only a small garrison of 447 men in the castello Visconteo under captain Guillaume Latrille de Lorencez. He deplored the demolition of the Regisole but some of his subordinates contravened Bonaparte's orders and supported the Jacobins' actions.

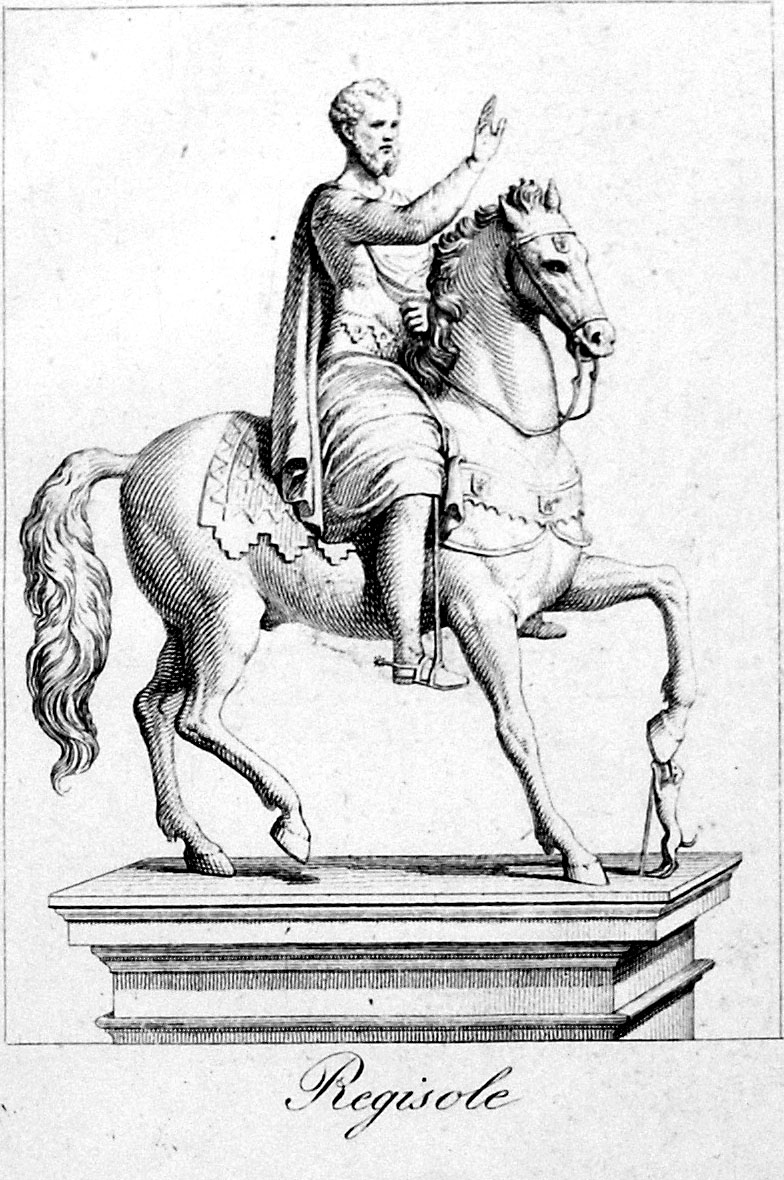
The Regisole

Rumours then started to spread in rural areas that the Austrians would soon return and some aristocrats and major landowners in the area began mobilising their peasants and tenant farmers. The anti-French effort began in Trivolzio on 17 May, spread to Casorate Primo and Binasco on 21 May with assistance from the parish priests of Samperone and Trivolzio - heavy requisitions of agricultural goods by the French forces meant that discontent was already simmering.

== Bibliography (in Italian) ==
- Gianfranco E. De Paoli, Pavia dall'età francese all'Unità d'Italia, in Storia di Pavia, V, L'età moderna e contemporanea, Pavia, Banca Regionale Europea, 2000.
- Gianfranco E. De Paoli, Una nuova analisi della rivolta contadina a Pavia e della repressione francese, in Il triennio cisalpino a Pavia e i fermenti risorgimentali dell'età napoleonica: aspetti inediti. Atti del convegno regionale del 15 giugno e 14 settembre 1996, a cura di Gianfranco E. De Paoli, Pavia, Cardano, 1996.
