= Regisole =

Lost equestrian statue formerly in Pavia

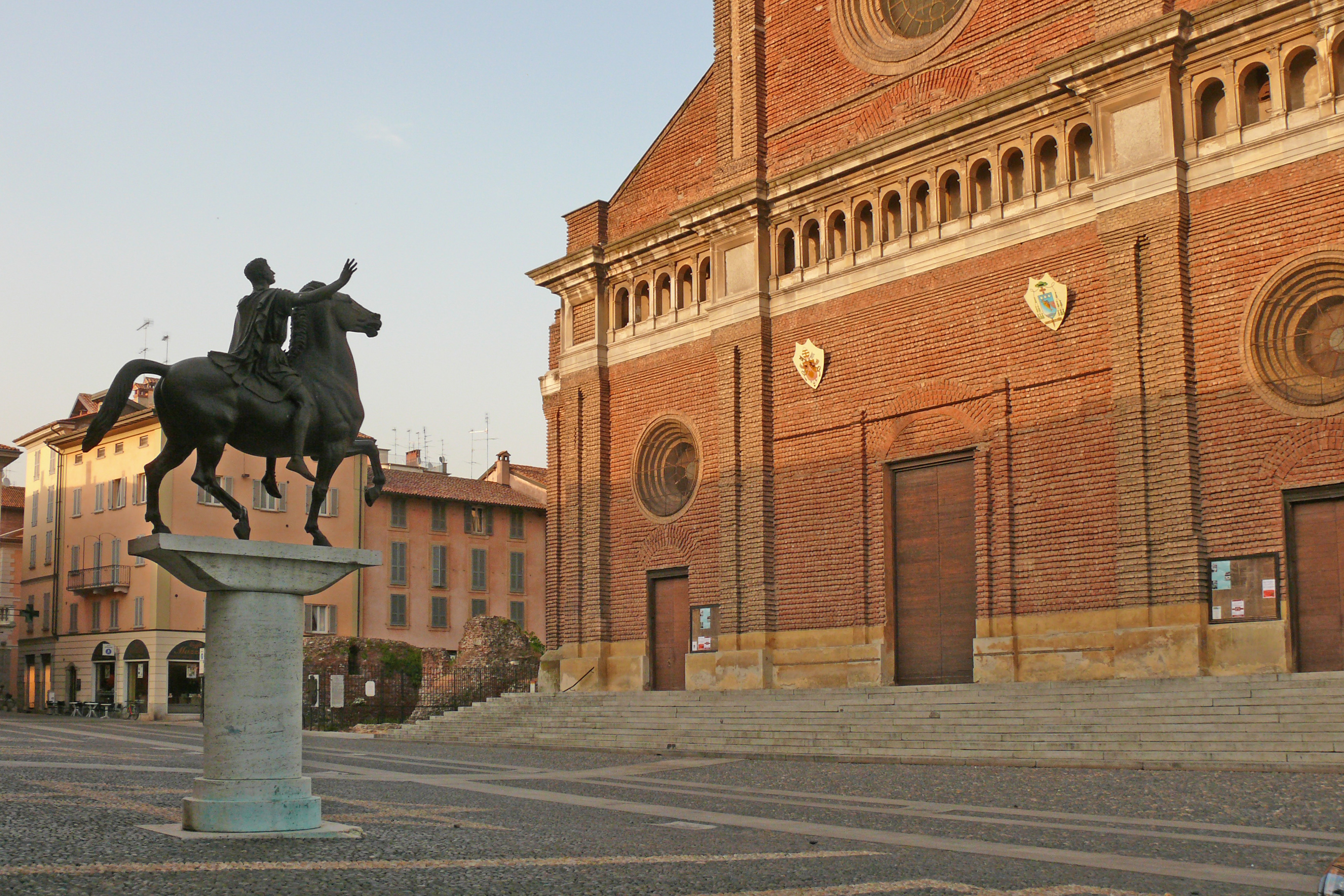
Today's Regisole monument in front of the Cathedral of Pavia. Beyond, at the left of the cathedral, ruins of the Torre Civica.

The Regisole ("Sun King") was a bronze classical or Late Antique equestrian monument, highly influential during the Italian Renaissance. It was originally erected at Ravenna, in what is now Italy, but was moved to Pavia in the Middle Ages, where it stood on a column before the cathedral, as an emblem of communal pride and Pavia's deep connection with imperial Rome.

The statue was destroyed in 1796 by the Jacobins, who saw it as a symbol of monarchy. A reproduction was made and erected in 1937.

== History ==
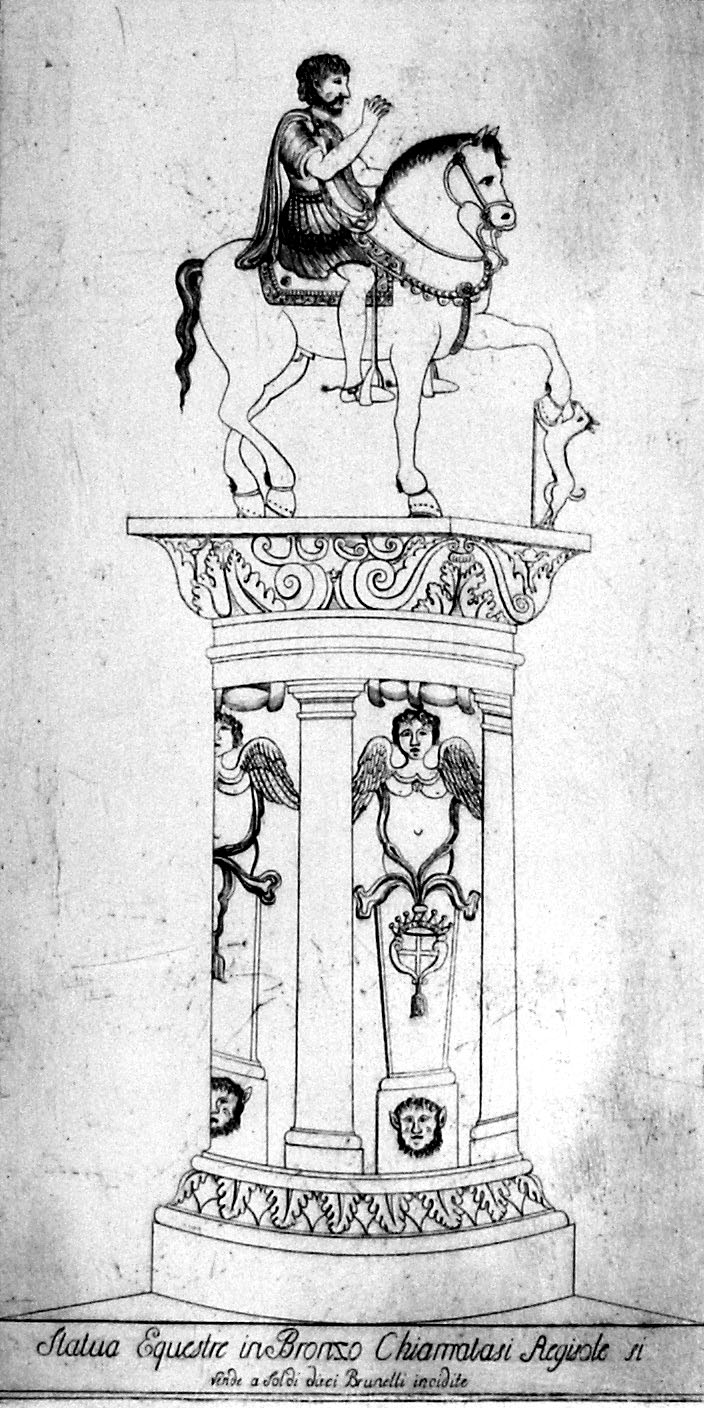
Drawing of 1817, after the Regisole was destroyed: for a souvenir print that sold for 10 soldi.

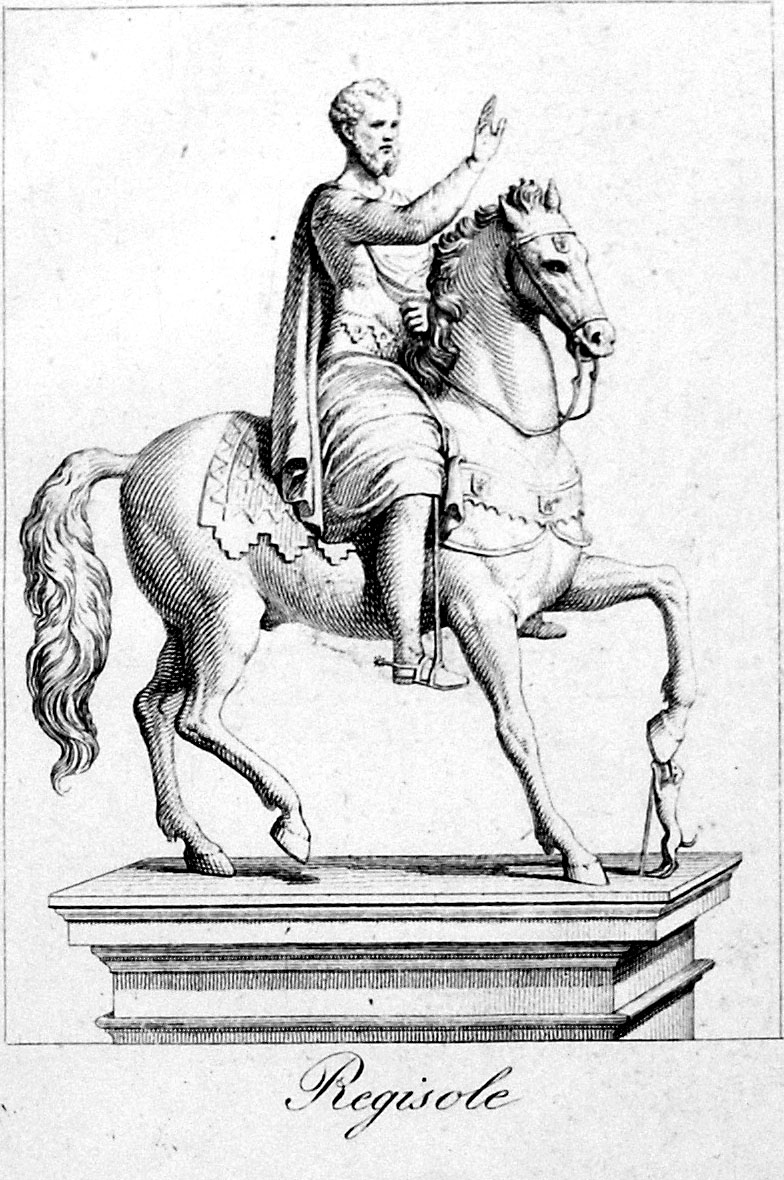
Regisole reproduction (C. Ferreri, 1832).

According to different modern scholars the subject was either Theodoric the Great, King of the Ostrogoths (reigned 471–526), "a Roman work of the third century AD", or "possibly Septimius Severus, with several later modifications" (he was emperor 193–211). Ravenna was the capital city of the Western Roman Empire from 402 until 476. It was later the capital of the Kingdom of the Ostrogoths and the Exarchate of Ravenna, the remaining Byzantine territory in northern Italy. The Colossus of Barletta is a standing Late Antique emperor in bronze that was probably erected on Constantinople's Column of Leo or that of Marcian. It might also have originated from Ravenna and was perhaps brought to Pavia as war booty by King Liutprand in 740 or by King Aistulf in 751.

The Arab geographer Ibrāhīm al-Turtuši, who traveled to central-western Europe between 960 and 965 and who also visited Pavia, claims to have seen a large bronze equestrian statue placed near one of the doors of the Royal Palace. The statue was placed in front of the cathedral after 1024, when the Royal Palace was destroyed, and since then it has been one of the symbols of the city, depicted for example on the silver seal of the Municipality.

According to the chronicler Benzo d'Alessandria, during a war between Pavia and Ravenna, the first would have taken the Regisole in Ravenna and would have brought it to Pavia, while the Ravenna, in revenge, would have torn some gilded bronze plates from a city gate of Pavia and, again via the Po, they would have transported them to their city. Benzo's story has not found historical references and is a legend, however, still in the fifteenth century a certain credit was still given to its reconstruction, so much so that, in 1435, the Visconti leader Niccolò Piccinino, after the conquest of Ravenna, sent, via boats, in Pavia two bronze doors from the late Roman age (now kept in the Civic Museums), which according to tradition had been plundered by the people of Ravenna during the legendary siege of Pavia.

When, having been removed as a trophy of war to Milan in 1315, the Regisole was restored to Pavia in 1335, it was regilded and provided with up-to-date imperial trappings, which may have included anachronistic harness and stirrups. Petrarch, who was aware that it had originally come from Ravenna, praised it in a letter to Boccaccio. An impression of the Regisole, no doubt coloured by Renaissance ideals of decorum, is obtained from a woodcut illustration on the title page of the book of statutes of the city of Pavia, Statuta de Regimine Potestatis, civilia et criminalia Civitatis et Comitatus Papiae (Pavia, 1505).

The Pavian bronze equestrian inspired 15th-century monuments such as the statues of the condottieri Gattamelata (which re-used the trick of adding a support under the raised leg of the horse, in this case a sphere instead of a dog) and Bartolomeo Colleoni. Leonardo da Vinci's note recording his visit to Pavia in June 1490 is recorded on a sheet of the Codex Atlanticus; the Regisole prompted him to write "the imitation of antique works is more praiseworthy than modern ones". His celebrated but minute record of the Regisole is among his drawings in the Royal Collection.

The historian Edward Gibbon, in passing through Pavia in May 1764, recorded details of the Regisole before its destruction: an equestrian statue of an emperor clad in chlamys and unarmed, leaning slightly forward and extending his arm in the attitude of an orator. The man was not bad, he thought, but the horse — which had inspired Leonardo — was "proud and beautiful". Without an inscription the monument was then being identified with Antoninus Pius, Constantine (whom the equestrian statue of Marcus Aurelius at Rome was long thought to represent) and Charles V, but Gibbon remarked that, unarmed and without a diadem, the latter two identifications were unlikely. The surviving images show the front left leg of the horse raised up, with the hoof resting on, or held by, a dog standing on its hind legs.

After the French Revolution, the Regisole was destroyed by the Jacobin Club in Pavia in 1796, since it was considered a symbol of monarchy.

In 1937, Mussolini entrusted sculptor Francesco Messina with the execution of a copy, according to ancient reproductions. The new Regisole, a 6-metre high bronze statue placed on a base of travertine, was relocated to the front of the Cathedral of Pavia and solemnly inaugurated on December 8, 1937.
