= Historic center of Barletta =

Historic sector in Barletta, Italy

Historic center of Barletta Centro storico di Barletta
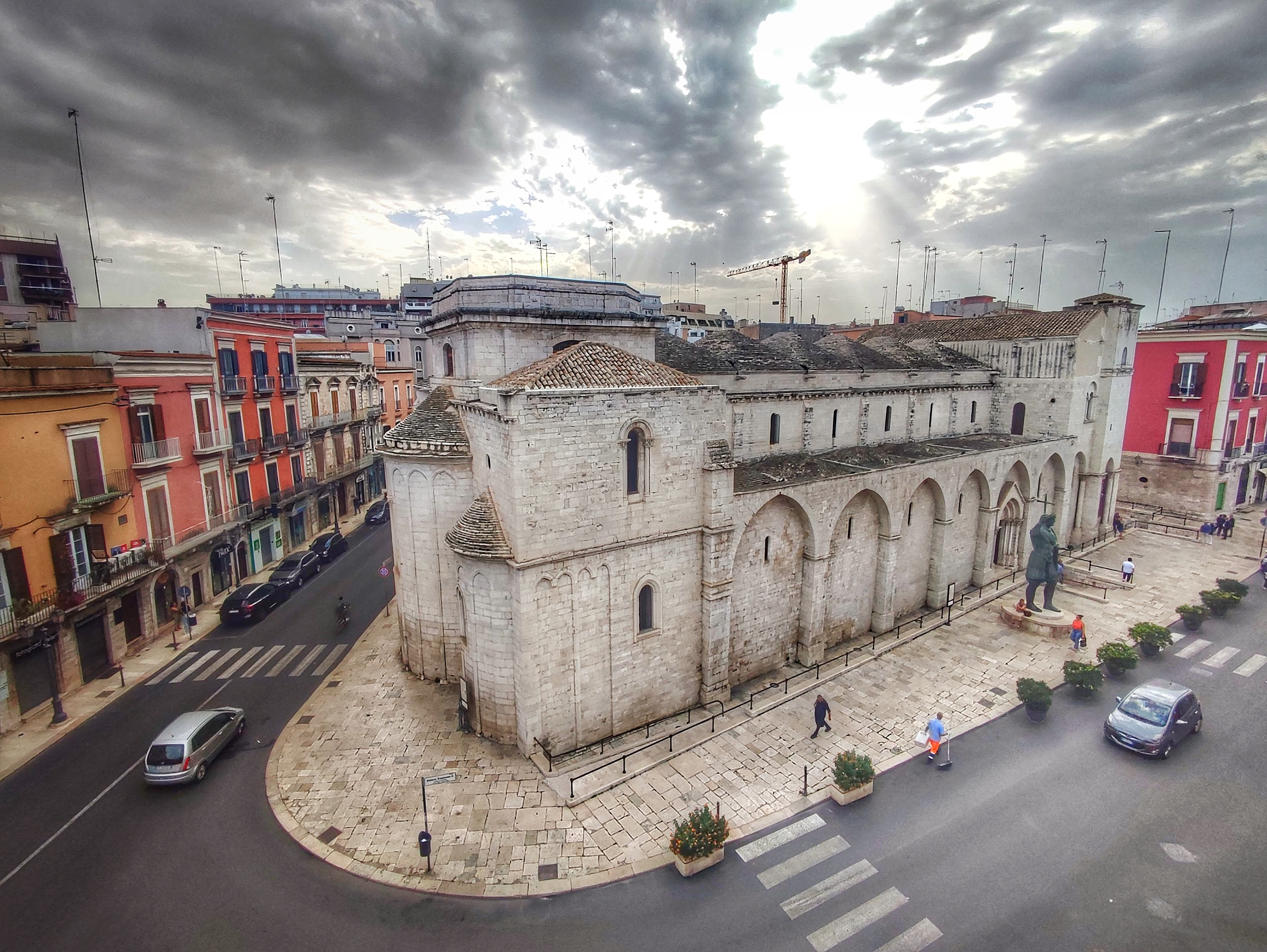
- Country: Italy
- Region: Apulia
- Province: Province of Barletta-Andria-Trani
- City: Barletta

The historic center of Barletta is the original core of the city of Barletta in Apulia, Italy. It has an area of approximately 3.5 km^{2} (1.4 sq mi).

== Pittaggi fondanti (Founding Districts) ==
Appearing for the first time in the Tabula Peutingeriana with the name of "Bardulos", the historical center of Barletta is extremely stratified. The current historical center, walled and developed only starting from the year one thousand, thanks to the work of the Normans, still preserves a primitive nucleus, identifiable with the early Christian complex located in the basement of the Cathedral of Barletta.

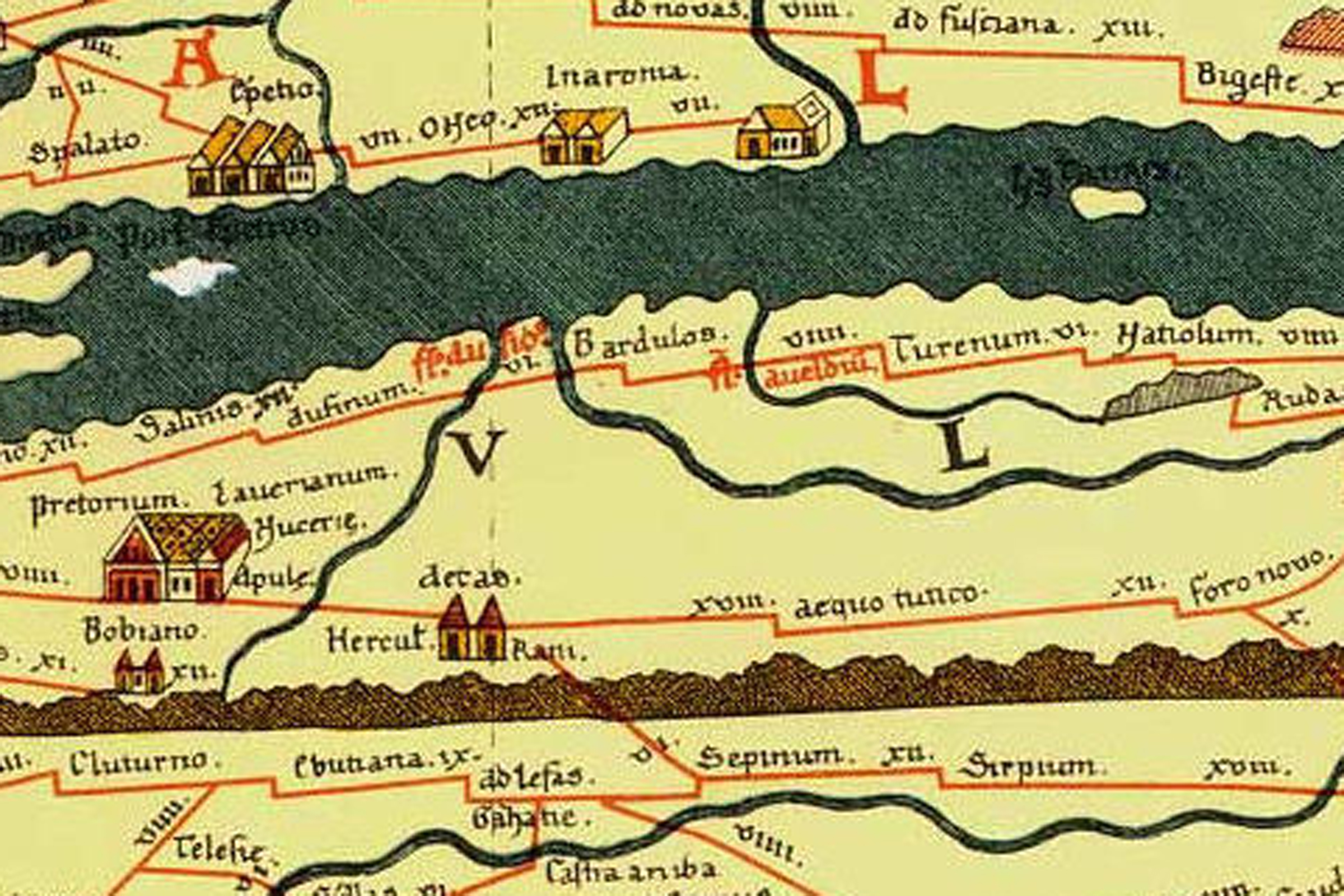
Indication of Bardolos in Roman times

During the Middle Ages Barletta was divided into 6 pittaggi (districts): Pittaggio di Santa Maria, Pittaggio di San Giacomo, Pittaggio dei Carrozzieri, Pittaggio di San Lazzaro, Pittaggio Marsicano, Pittaggio del Sepolcro .

=== Santa Maria ===
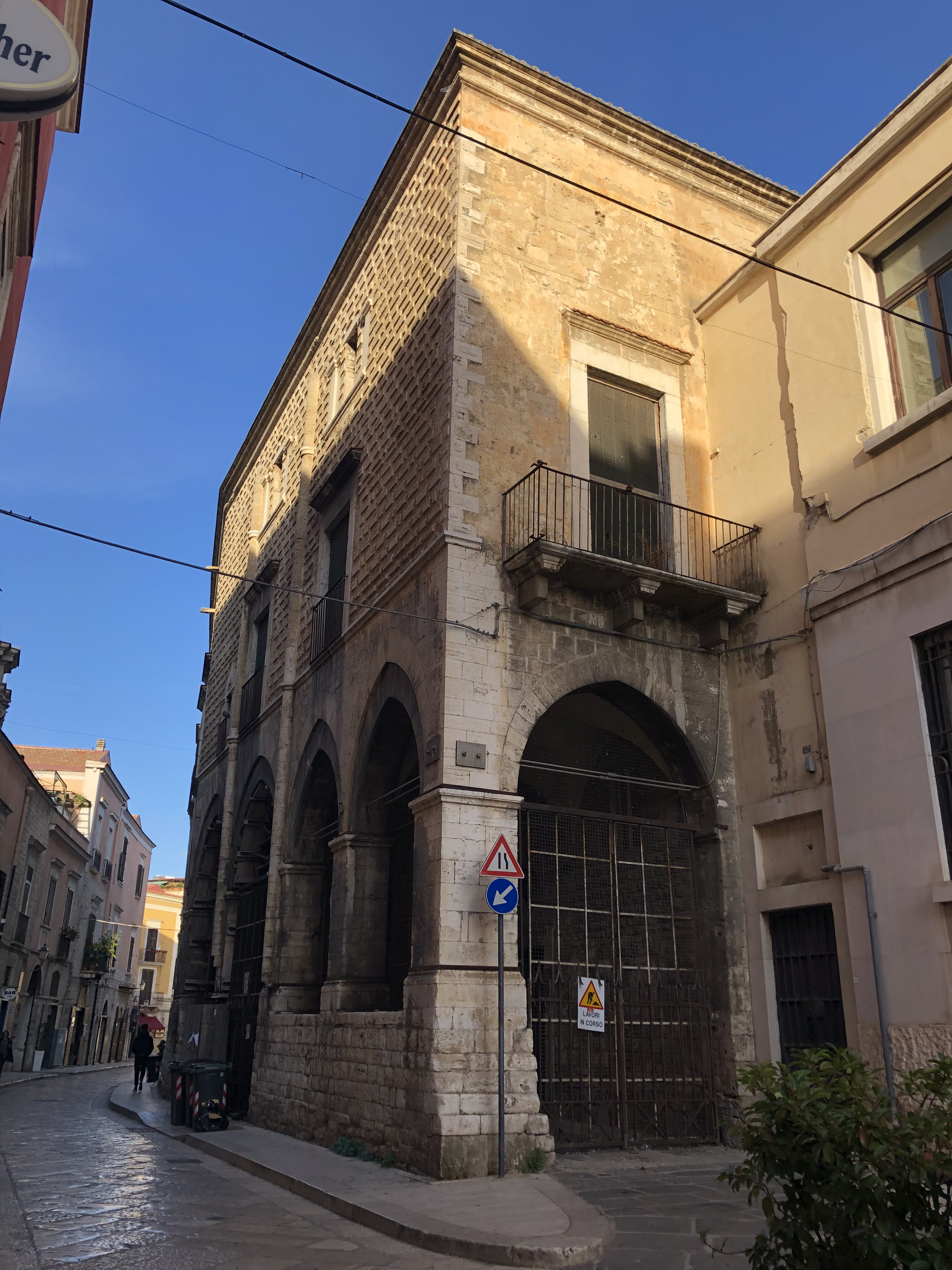
via duomo, one of the e pittaggintrancepittaggioe village.

It is the oldest district and represents the place where the Normans from the year 1000 onwards built the modern Barletta, until then only a village of little importance.

The district houses the oldest religious complex in the city, under the current Barletta Cathedral and is the best preserved in the city.

==== Monuments ====
- Plague Burial Ground of Barletta
- Porta Marina
- Barletta Cathedral
- Convent of Sant'Andrea
- Barletta Castle
- Barletta Lighthouse
- Birthplace of Carlo Maria Giulini
- Cantina della Sfida

=== San Giacomo ===
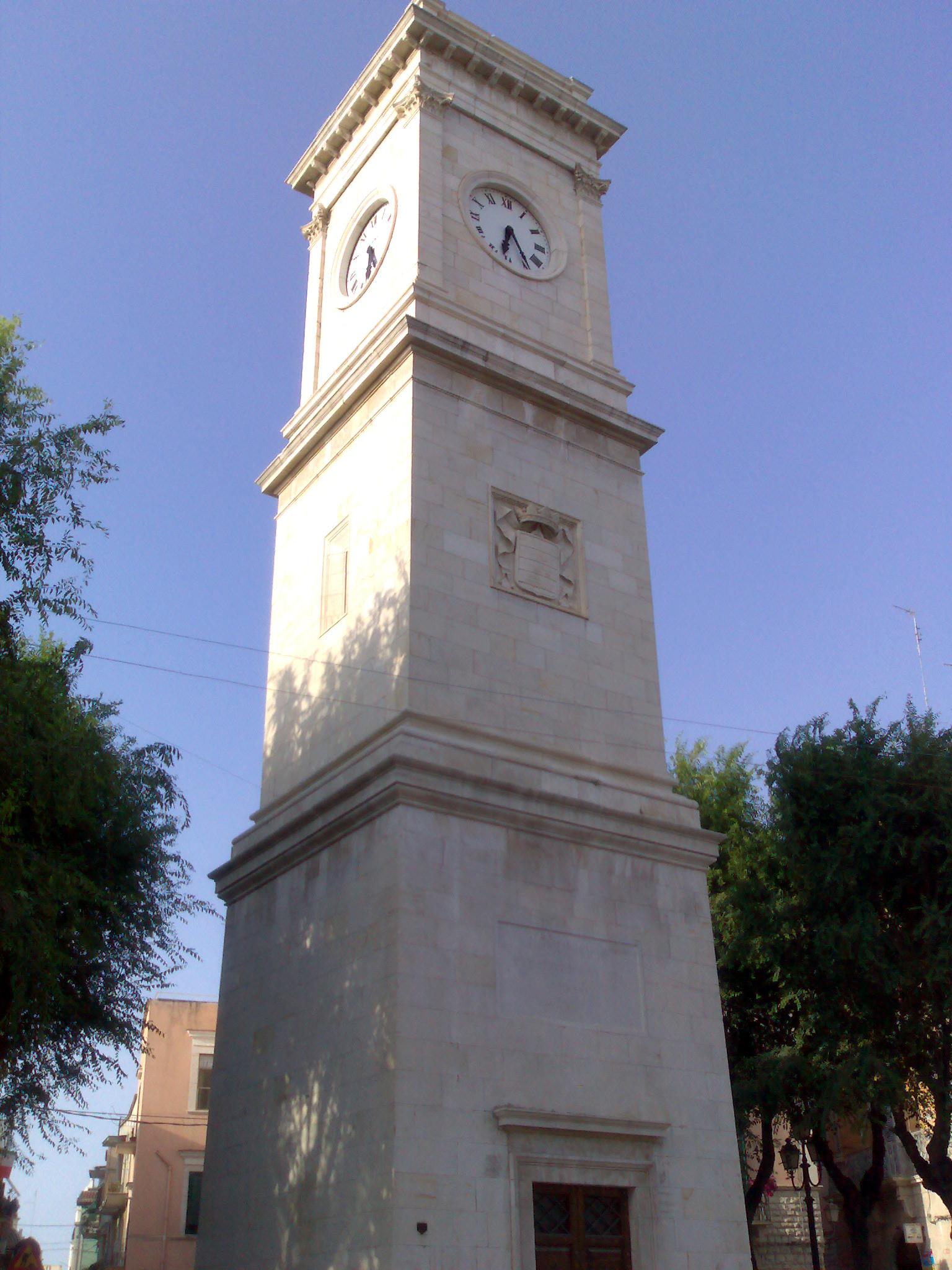
The clock tower of the church of San Giacomo.

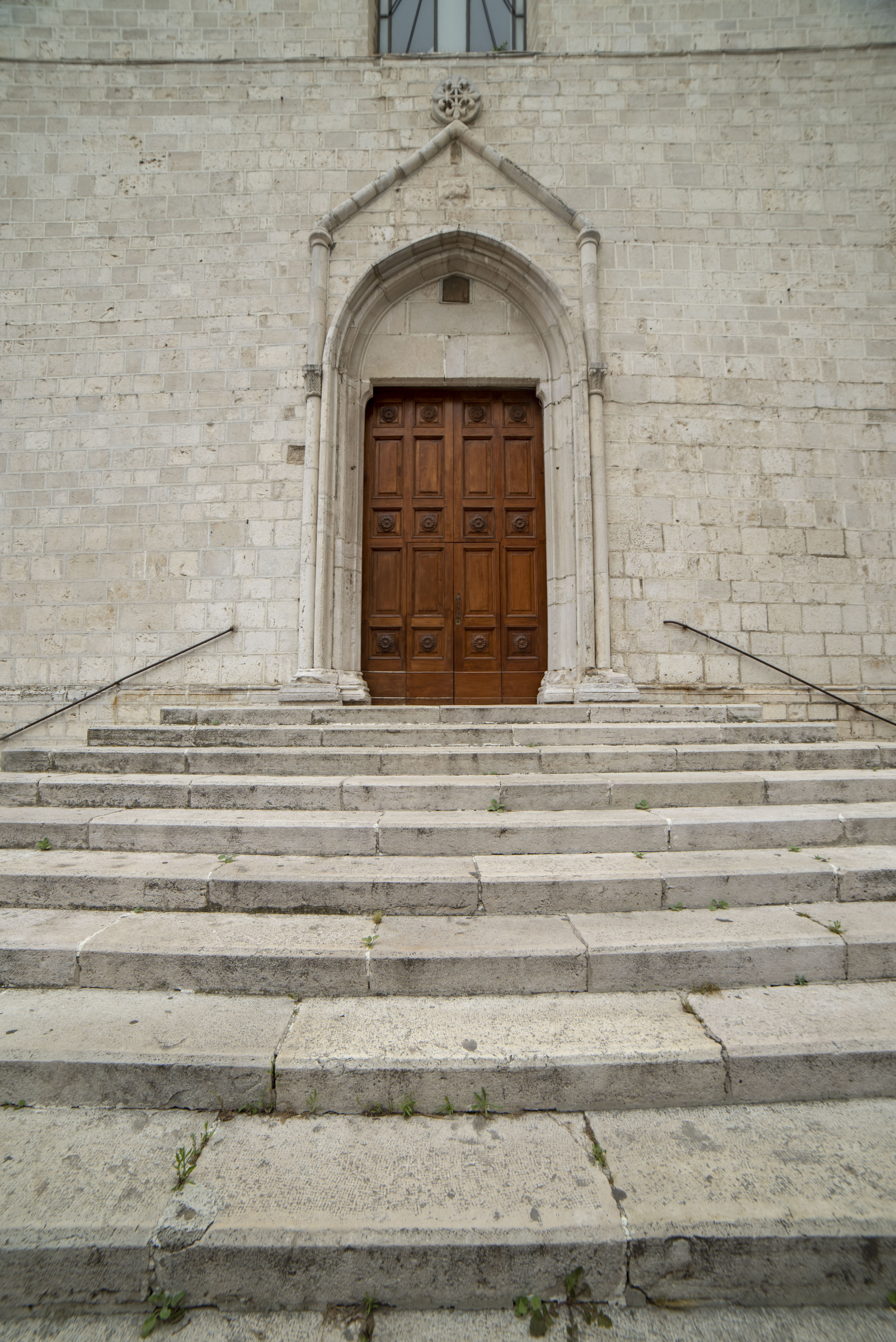
The church of Sant'Agostino together with the former hospital marks the border between the historic center and Settefrati.

It is the last strip of the historic center, before the twentieth-century neighborhood of Settefrati. It developed as a satellite area of Santa Maria, thanks to the arrival of the inhabitants of Canne della Battaglia in Barletta and before that it had welcomed the citizens of Canosa di Puglia and Margherita di Savoia. Its borders go from Piazza Plebiscito to the former hospital of Barletta.

==== Monuments ====
- Palazzo dell'Arco Pretorio
- Monument to Massimo d'Azeglio
- Church of San Giacomo
  - Clock Tower of San Giacomo
- Birthplace of Pietro Mennea
- Palazzo Perfetti-Former Hospital
- Bronze Door of Dimiccoli monastery
- Church of Sant'Agostino

=== Sette Rue ===
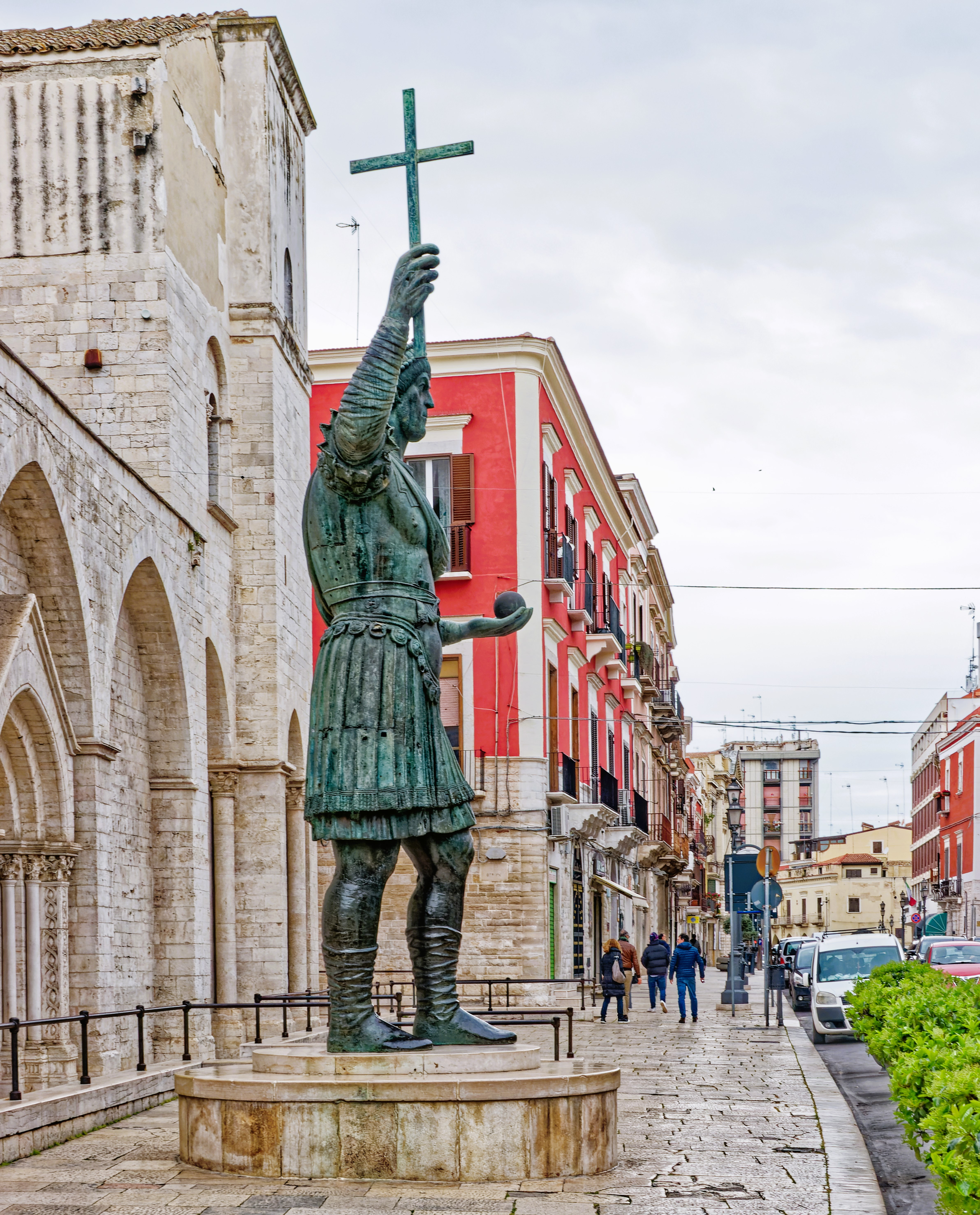
Colossus of Barletta, symbol of the city.

It represents the first ordered expansion of the medieval city. The district is characterized by large noble palaces and a uniform urban line, which has given identity to the neighborhood, through 7 perfectly perpendicular streets. At the first end we find the main street, at the other Via Cialdini, or the street of convents and monasteries.

==== Monuments ====
- Curci Theater
- Giuseppe De Nittis Art Gallery
- Gallo Gallery
- Colossus of Barletta
- Giuseppe De Nittis House Museum
- Basilica of the Holy Sepulchre
- Church of the Greeks
- Patargo Palace

== Squares and streets ==
Piazza Plebiscito

It acts as a hinge between San Giacomo and Sette Rue. In the center of the square there is the monument to the Madonna. It is embellished with numerous noble palaces.

Piazza Duomo

It develops in front and behind the Barletta Cathedral and dominates the view of the Castle.

Piazza S.S Trinità

Currently it is a widening used by extra-urban buses, but in the future the creation of a new square is planned to act as a link between Settefrati and the historic center.

Piazza Monte di Pietà

It is the only square in Sette Rue pittaggio, located at the end of Via Nazareth. The square is the backdrop to the baroque complex of Monte di Pietà, including the Prefecture building.

Piazza Marina

It is the square that dominates the seaside village of Santa Maria. It hosts the homonymous gate from 1750. In the center there is a 16th-century fountain.

Piazza della Sfida

It is located at the end of Santa Maria, in front of the Cantina della Sfida, on via cialdini.

Piazza 13 febbraio 1503

It is the square that connects the historic center to the modern suburbs of Barletta. It hosts the birthplace of Carlo Maria Giulini .

Piazza Principe Umberto

It stands in the village of San Giacomo. In the background we find the former hospital and the Church of Sant'Agostino (Barletta).

Corso Vittorio Emanuele, Corso Garibaldi and Via Cavour

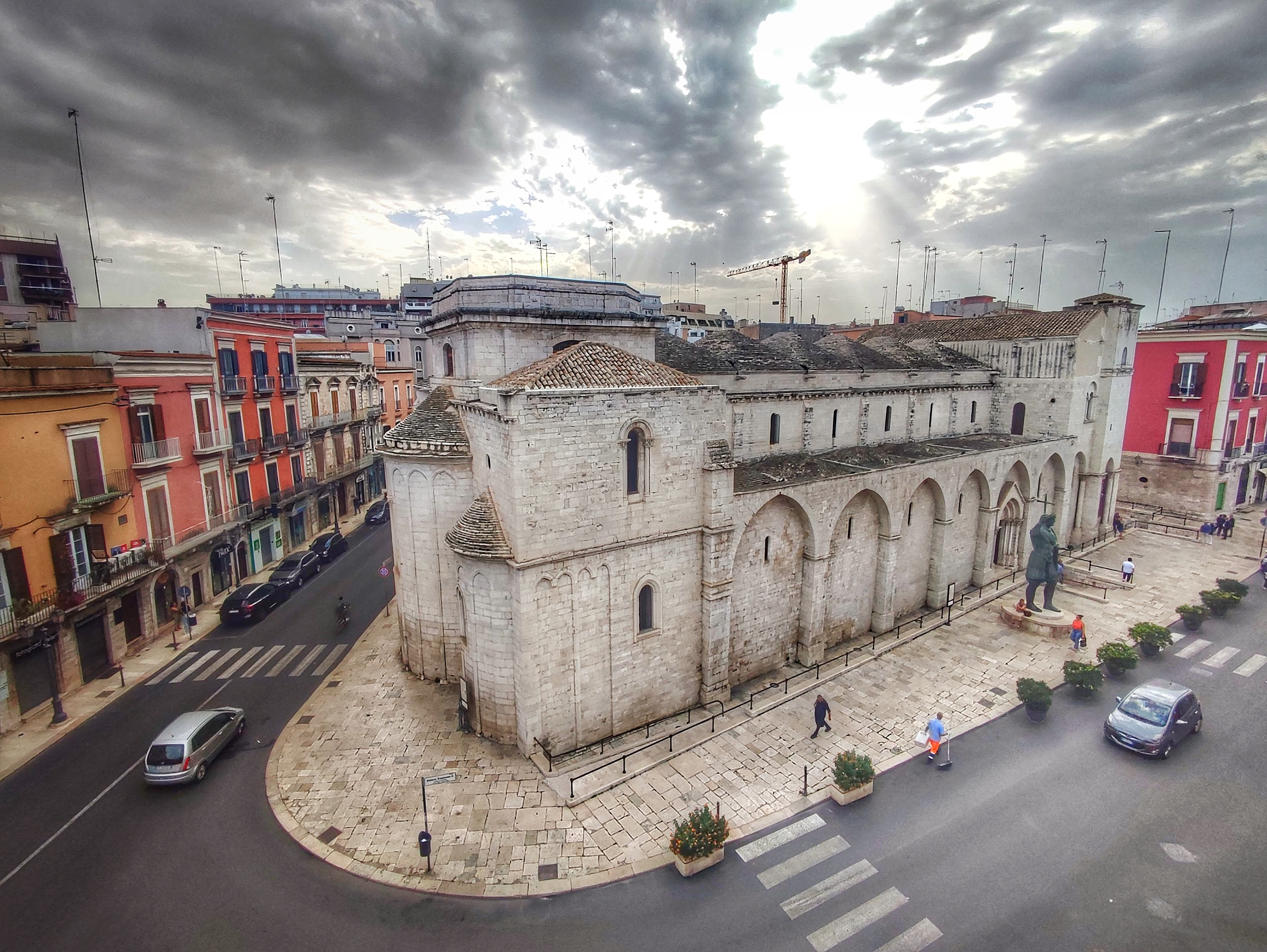
Corso Vittorio Emanuele crosses Corso Garibaldi.

They are the three most important streets in the historic center, together they form an avenue about 1.3 km (0.81 mi) long.

Famous residents of the three streets:

- Joseph Bonaparte

He stayed inside Palazzo Marulli, located on Corso Garibaldi during the reign of Naples.

- Joachim Murat

He stayed inside Palazzo Marulli, located on Corso Garibaldi during the reign of Naples.

- Giuseppe De Nittis

He was born and lived until adolescence in Palazzo Castrota, located on Corso Vittorio Emanuele 14.

- Carlo Cafiero

He was born in the palace of the same name located on Corso Vittorio Emanuele in 1850. He spent his childhood there and then went to Naples.

- Judah Leon Abravanel

During his stay in Italy to escape Portuguese persecution, he lived for a year in Barletta, in what is now Via Cavour, at the time the epicentre of the local Jews district.

- Valdemaro Vecchi

He was granted food and lodging by the municipality of Barletta, in the former convent of San Domenico, located between Via Cavour and Corso Garibaldi.

== Peninsula Pier ==
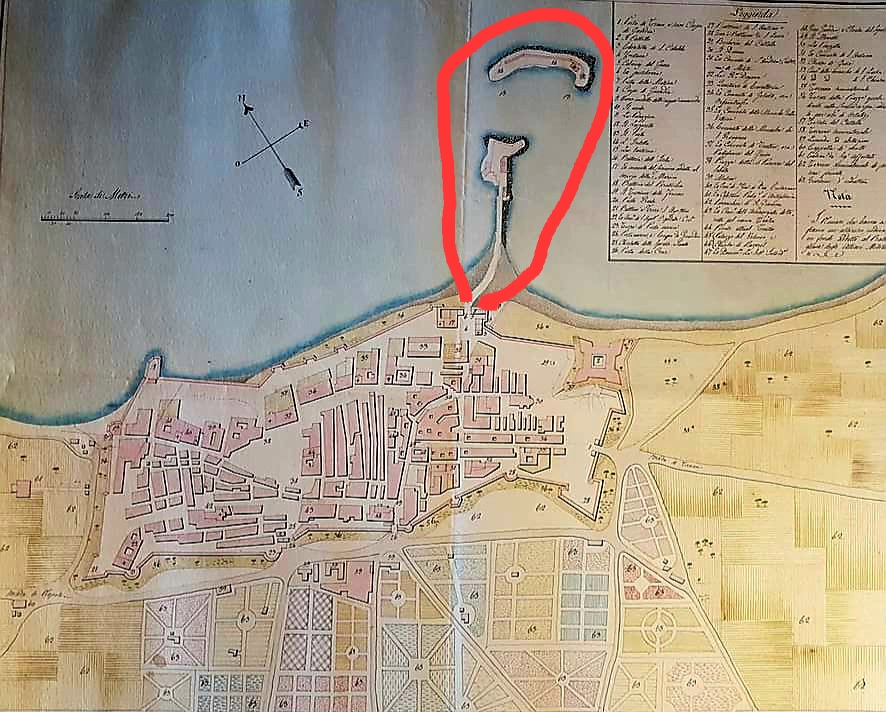
The Peninsula Pier is circled in red,1870

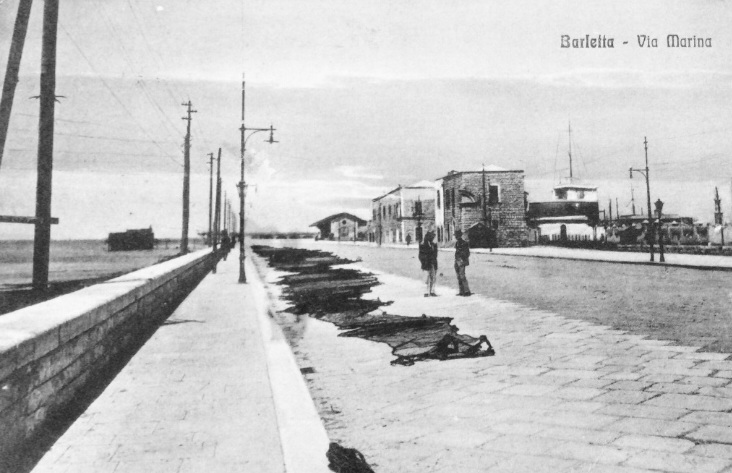
View of the access avenue to the Port Peninsula,1910

The Peninsula Pier is the part of the historic center of Barletta resting on the sea and constitutes the western pier of the port of Barletta . It extends for about 2 km (1.2 mi) and contains within it the building of the former port authority, the remains of the ancient connecting bridge, the ancient building of the Maritime Health Authority and the Barletta Lighthouse, built in the early 1800s. Its existence has been confirmed since the Middle Ages and until the renovation at the end of the eighteenth century it was connected to the mainland by two bridges, constituting a real "island". With the creation of the new port, the islet was incorporated into the new pier, thus forming, in fact, a peninsula, a strip of land jutting out into the sea. In the past the area was entirely paved and lit with Art Nouveau street lamps.
