= Cantina della Sfida =

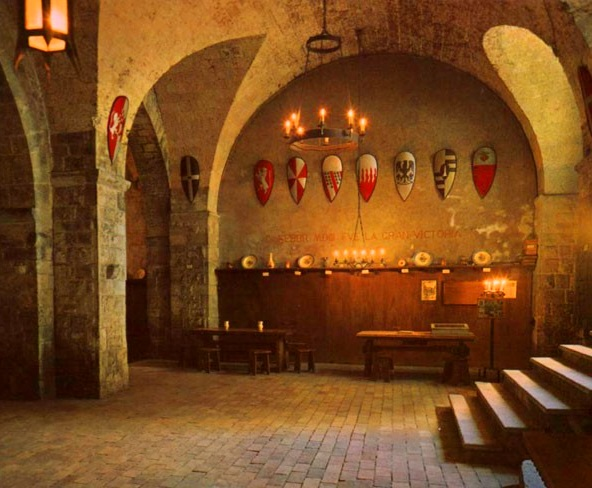
- interiors
- Click on the map for a fullscreen view

General information
- Architectural style: Medieval
- Location: Barletta, Italy
- Coordinates: 41°19′00″N 16°17′00″E
- Construction started: 13th century
- Completed: 14th century

Design and construction
- Architect: Unknown

The complex is located in the Santa Maria district, in the Historic center of Barletta, within a dense urban fabric of medieval origin characterized by narrow streets and stone buildings. The structure traditionally known as the Cantina della Sfida is a historic building composed of several interconnected rooms arranged on different levels, reflecting the typical architecture of medieval taverns in southern Italy.

According to local tradition, the lower level hosted the formal act of challenge that led to the famous Challenge of Barletta(Disfida di Barletta) in 1503. While this episode is rooted mainly in historical tradition rather than direct documentary proof, it is historically established that the building functioned as a medieval tavern or inn, known as the “Osteria di Veleno,” where soldiers and travelers would gather during the period of the Italian Wars.

== Architecture ==
The architecture is a prime example of medieval stone masonry and tavern, specifically reflecting the functional yet sturdy style common in 15th-century Apulia.

The most striking feature is the ribbed vaulting and the series of wide round arches (Romanesque influence).

The space is divided into bays by massive stone pillars. The flooring consists of terracotta bricks laid in a traditional herringbone or staggered pattern, which was typical for cellar environments to manage humidity and provide durability.

While originally a cellar and tavern, the space is now a museum dedicated to the Disfida di Barletta (1503).

The atmosphere is enhanced by:

- Heraldry: The walls are adorned with the coats of arms (shields) of the 13 Italian knights and the 13 French knights who participated in the historic duel:
- Lighting: Wrought-iron chandeliers and wall-mounted lanterns provide warm, atmospheric lighting that mimics the torchlight of the Renaissance.
- Military Memorabilia: The presence of full suits of armor and draped Spanish/Imperial flags emphasizes the room's role as a site of military honor.
- The Fireplace: A large, hooded stone fireplace serves as a focal point in one of the bays, suggesting the room's former use as a gathering place.

== The Cantina today ==
In 1938, the complex was purchased by the Municipality of Barletta for 400,000 lire. The acquisition occurred during the Fascist period, when there was strong institutional interest in promoting historical episodes considered symbolic of Italian valor and national identity. Restoration and conservation works were subsequently undertaken to preserve the site and highlight its connection with the historical narrative of the Challenge of Barletta.
