= Column of Leo =

Roman triumphal column in Constantinople (Istanbul, Turkey)

- Πιττάκια (Medieval Greek)
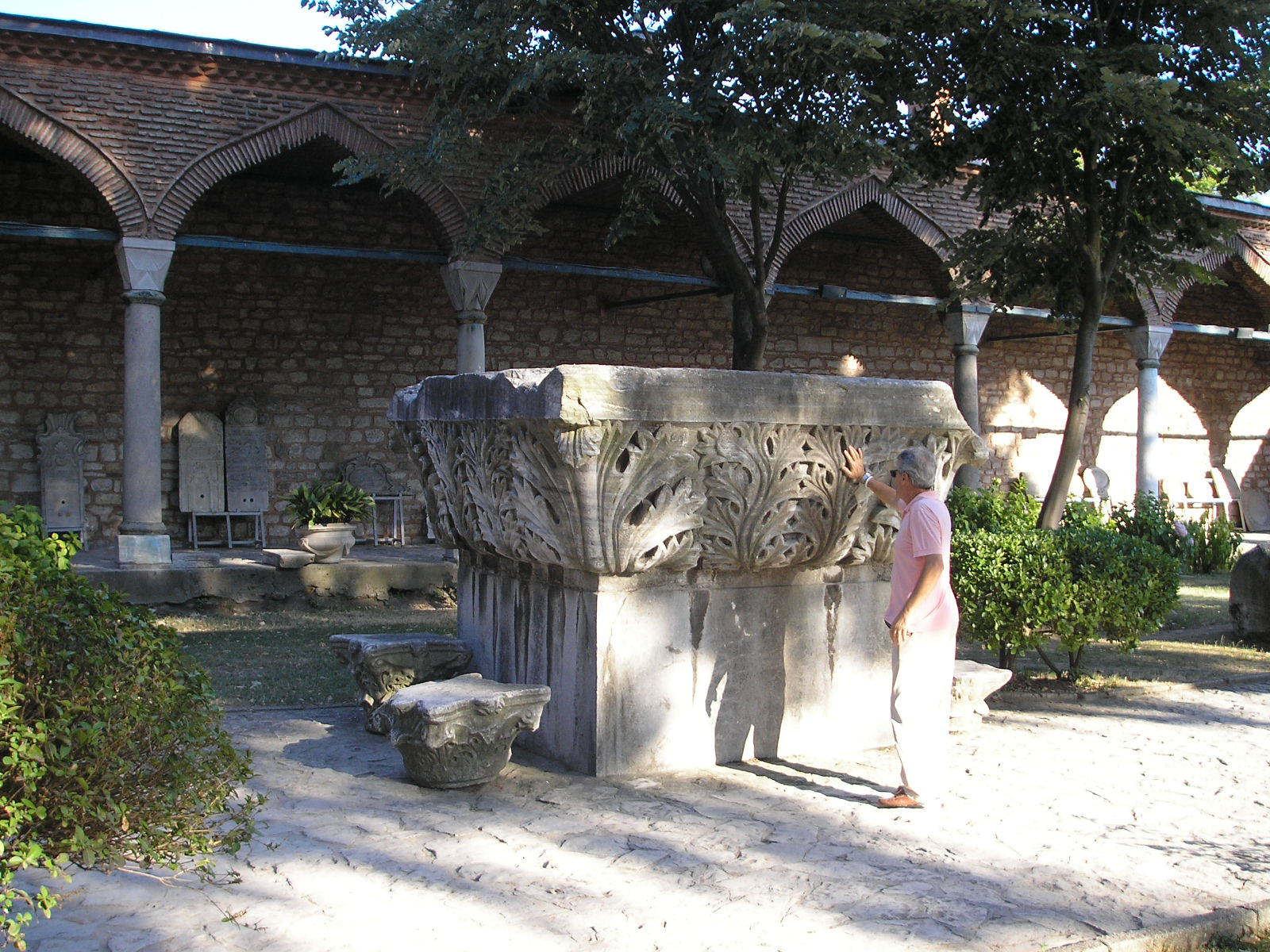

- Location in Constantinople Location in Turkey
- 41.013276°N 28.984825°E
- Type: Roman triumphal column
- Periods: Late Antiquity
- Cultures: East Roman Empire
- Location: Forum of Leo, Constantinople; Topkapı Palace, Fatih, Istanbul, Turkey

History
- Built: 457-474 AD (reign of Leo I)
- Built by: Euphemia or Verina augusta

Site notes
- Material: marble
- Height: c. 21-26 m (total original without statue) 20.75 m (column shaft) 6 m (granite socle)
- Diameter: c. 2.10 m (column drums) c. 3m (capital)
- Architectural style: Corinthian
- Archaeologists: Aziz Oğan
- Condition: Ruined

The Column of Leo was a 5th-century AD Roman honorific column in Constantinople. Built for Leo I, Augustus of the East from 7 February 457 to 18 January 474, the column stood in the Forum of Leo, known also as the Pittakia. It was a marble column, without flutes, composed of drums with a Corinthian capital, surmounted by a statue of the emperor.

The column no longer exists, but fragments belonging to it were discovered in the mid-20th century in the grounds of the Topkapı Palace, including the capital and the impost block atop it, a complete column drum and some parts of a second, and the statue's pedestal, which was originally separated from the impost by a missing plinth. The remains are visible in the second courtyard of the Topkapı complex. The column's own socle, pedestal, and base are lost. The statue too may be lost, or it may be the bronze statue now known as the Colossus of Barletta in Italy.

== Literary references ==
The column's existence in the Forum of Leo, near the Topkapı Palace, is attested by mentions in several Byzantine Greek texts: the Patria of Constantinople, the Parastaseis syntomoi chronikai, and George Cedrenus. According to John Lydus, the Forum of Leo, where the column was, was at the pittakia. According to the Patria, the column of Leo was dedicated in his honour by a sister of his called Euphemia, while Cedrenus mentions Leo's wife Verina; no record of any dedicatory inscription has been preserved. The column no longer existed when Petrus Gyllius was writing his De Topographia Constantinopoleos et de illius antiquitatibus libri IV. in the 1540s.

== Reconstruction ==
After the discovery of the various fragments around the column's site, Byzantinist and archaeologist Urs Peschlow determined the fragments to be related to one another and published a reconstruction of the Column of Leo in 1986. In it he argued the Colossus of Barletta, a much restored Late Antique bronze statue of an emperor in armour, came originally from the summit the Column of Leo, on account of its fitting the proportions of the reconstructed column. It has elsewhere been suggested the 1561 drawing by Melchior Lorck of the reliefs of an honorific column pedestal, usually believed to show the now-obscured pedestal of the extant Column of Constantine, could show instead the vanished pedestal of Leo's column.

According to Peschlow's reconstruction, the column would have been between 21 and 26 m tall, without its statue, with a column shaft of about 15 m made up of eight drums, and a socle, pedestal and base nearly 7 m high. These determinations were made by analogy to the proportions of the Column of Marcian. Leo's column was probably of eight drums; the surviving complete column drum was marked with an Η, meaning "№ 8", and according to Peschlow, indicating it was the eighth drum. The top of the drum is somewhat concave, to bed in the capital above. Carved representations of laurel wreaths surround one edge of the surviving drums of the column shaft. The joins between the drums were concealed by these sculpted wreaths. Each wreath had in its centre a medallion at the "forehead" of the wreath, inscribed with a wreathed Christian symbol related to the Chi Rho and resembling the IX monogram.

The capital, more than two metres high, and nearly 3 m broad, tapers towards a diameter at its bottom of 1.78 m, similar to the thickness of the column drums below, which measure 1.79 m at their bottom and 2.10 m at the top, where the wreath is. The capital itself had human face protomes projecting from the centre of each side of the block, between the volutes where a fleuron would typically be. Acanthus buds appear on the volutes at each corner.

The preserved column drums show that the 34 cm broad wreaths concealed joins fixed by three or more metal dowels, whose holes survive. The capital too was attached by dowels: four connected it with the impost block above.

The impost block, over a metre high and nearly 3 m wide at the top, has a frieze of vegetal decoration of acanthus leaves. On its upper side are four dowel holes in a recessed area and numerous other rectangular holes for attachments. Another surviving marble block fits the attachment above the impost block; this block itself had four dowels for the attachment of a plinth above. This plinth will have carried the statue and was fixed with metal cramps on its sides.

With its laurel wreaths connecting its stacked column drums, the Column of Leo recalls the porphyry Column of Constantine, while the Column of Marcian is the closest stylistic parallel to the capital. Marcian's column was set up in the early 450s and is thus also the closest chronologically to Leo's.

== Forum of Leo ==
The Forum of Leo was the last forum to be built in a Roman capital city. Its exact location is uncertain. According to a 15th-century Latin translation of a work by Manuel Chrysoloras, it stood "on the hill of Byzantium, to the right of the temple of Peace" (super Byzantiorum tumulo ad dexteram templi Pacis). The templum Pacis was the church of Hagia Irene, and the "hill of Byzantium" the acropolis of the pre-Constantinian Roman city of Byzantium. Here, according to John Malalas, were ancient temples dedicated to Helios, Artemis, and Aphrodite and later used for other purposes. Subsequently, the area was the site of the Topkapı Palace. The Chronicon Paschale states that the temple of Aphrodite was opposite the theatre. According to Dark and Harris, this means the Second Courtyard of the Topkapı complex is likely the site of the Forum of Leo. Archaeological excavations there have revealed the remains of an aisled basilica with a narthex and a polygonal apse. There may also have been an atrium. The basilica was a church and may have been built in 471 as an original part of the forum. It may have been the same church of Saints Peter and Paul that a hundred years later the augustus Justin II had (re)built in 571.

== Gallery ==
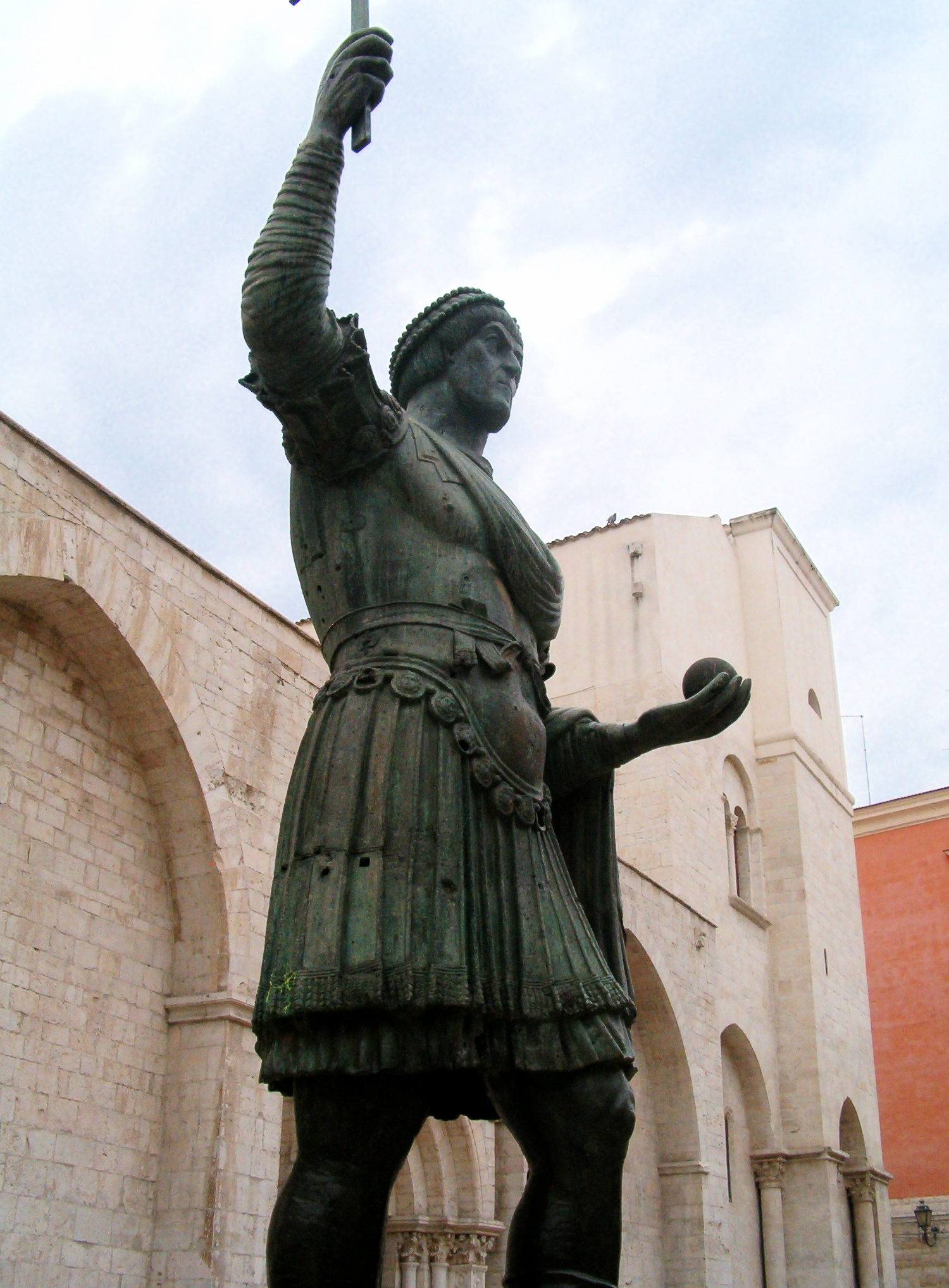
The Barletta Colossus, possibly from Constantinople's Column of Leo

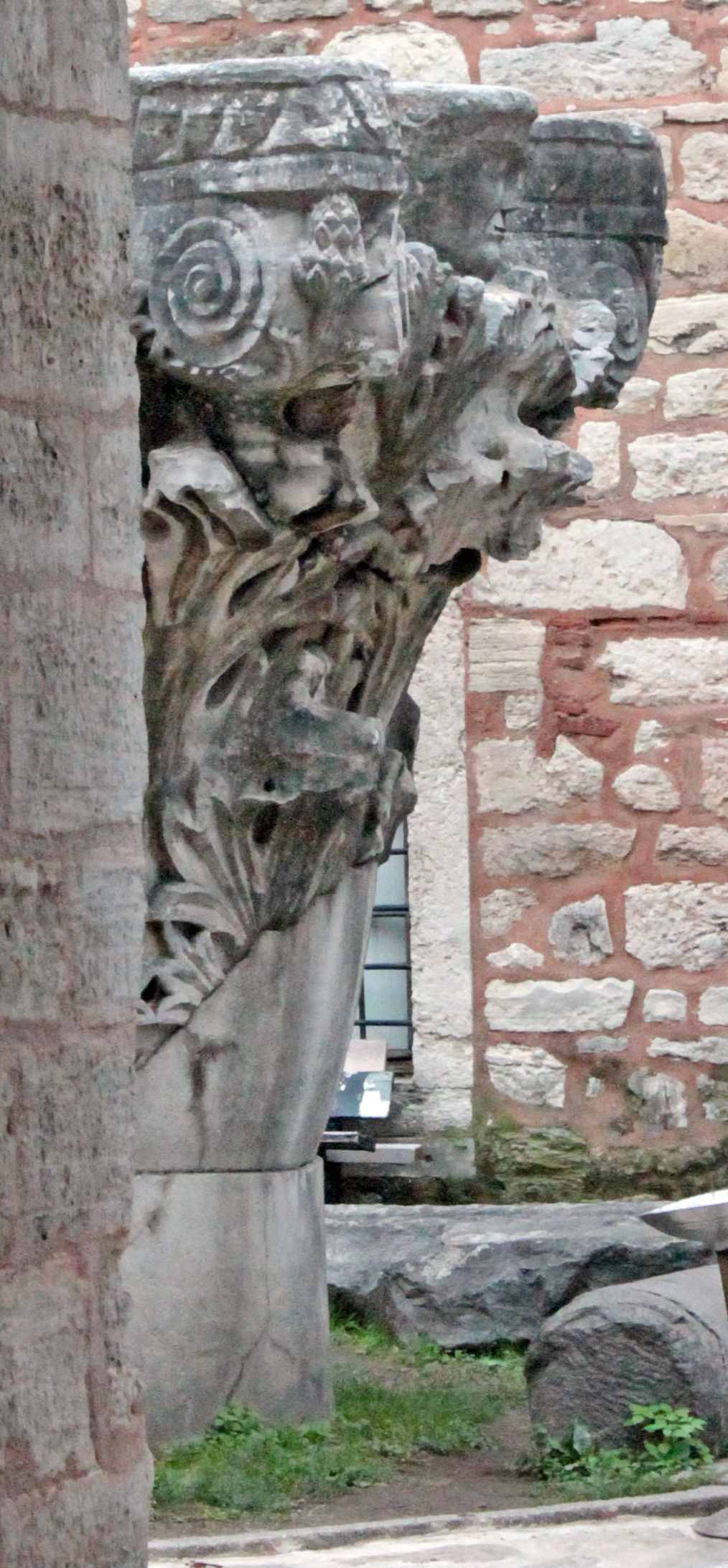
Partial view of the capital

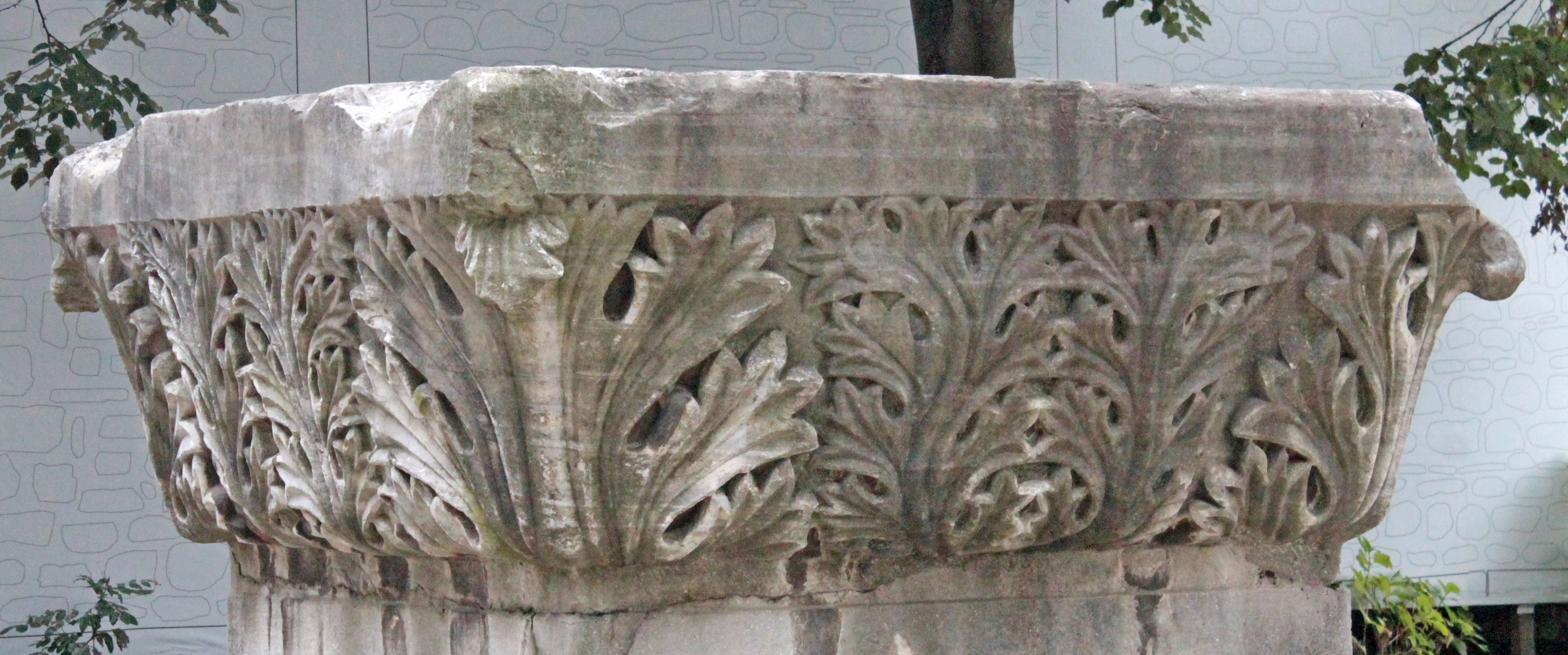
Impost block

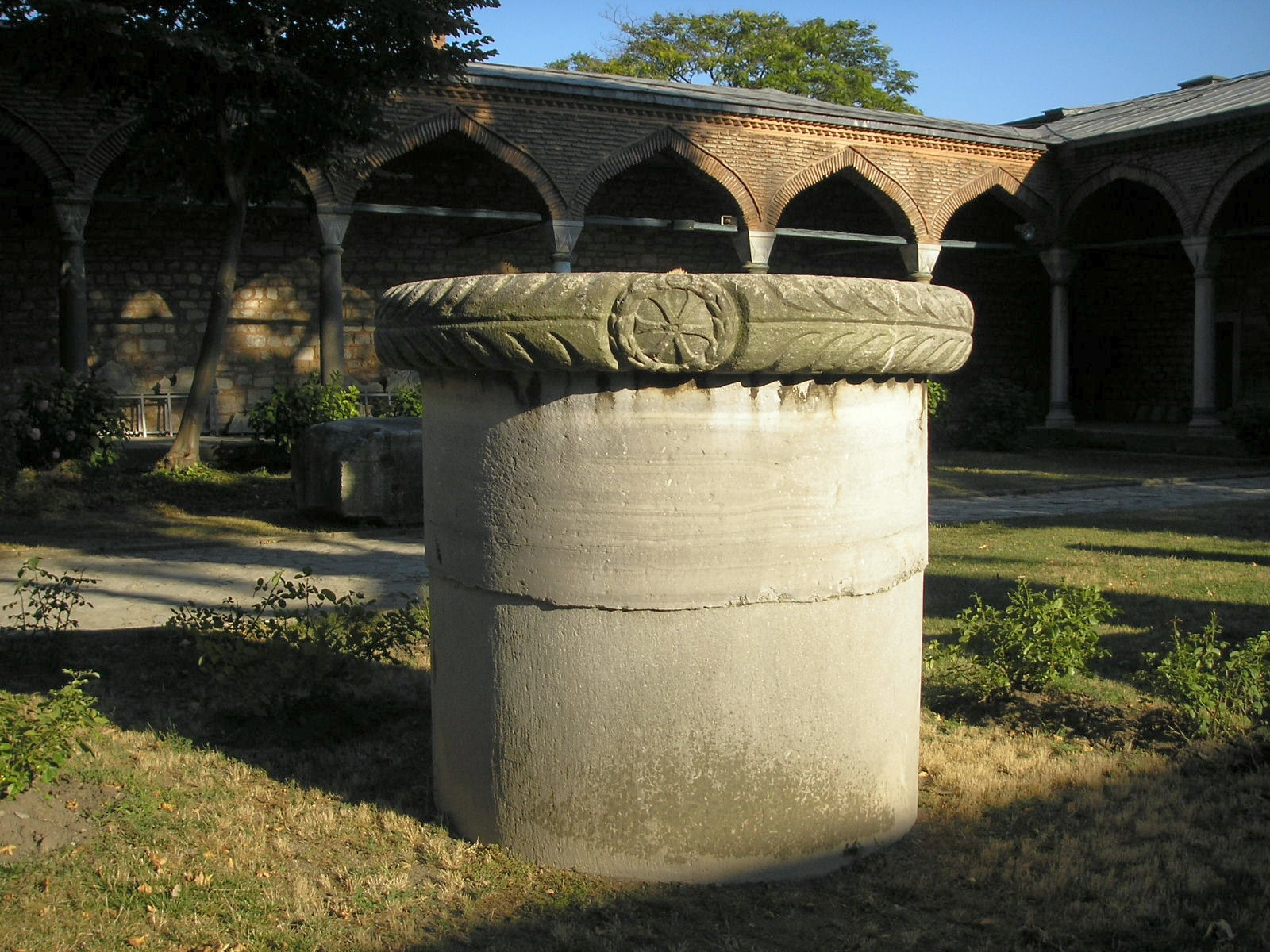
Column drum, probably the uppermost of eight
