= Church of the Holy Sepulchre (Barletta) =

Church in Barletta, Italy

- Basilica del Santo Sepolcro
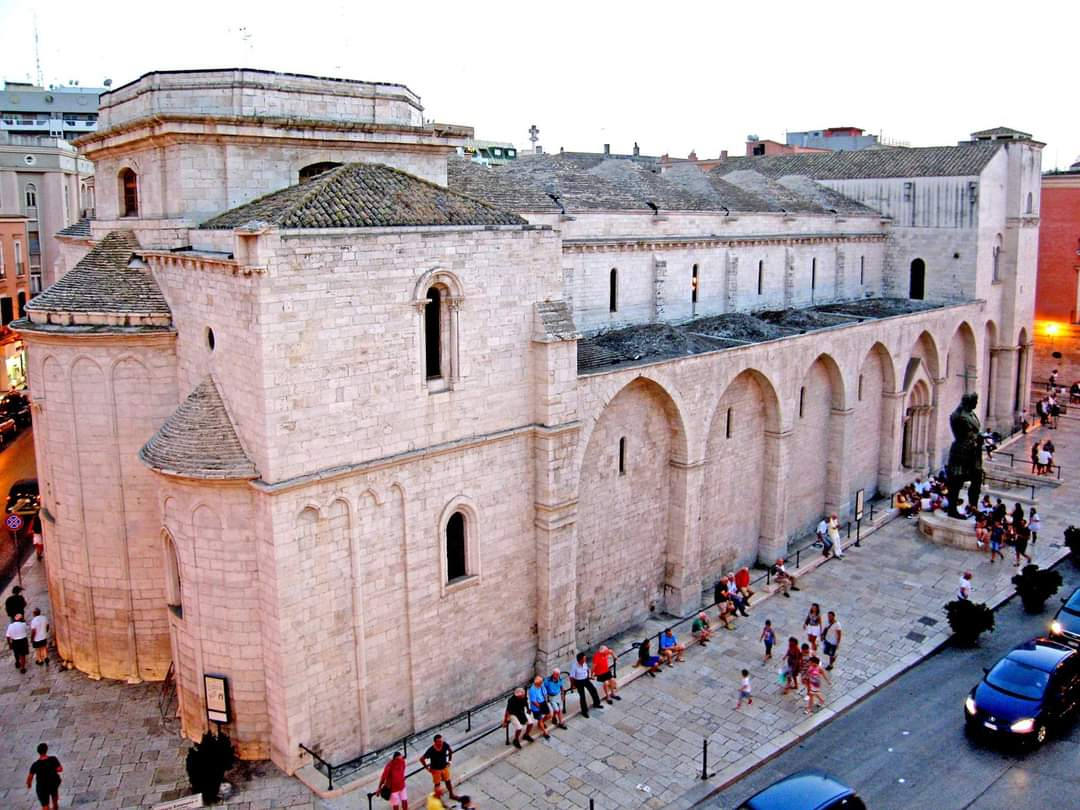

- 41.313611°N 16.269167°E
- Location: Barletta, Apulia, Italy
- Denomination: Catholic

History
- Consecrated: 1130

Architecture
- Style: Gothic

Administration
- Archdiocese: Roman Catholic Archdiocese of Trani-Barletta-Bisceglie

The Church of the Holy Sepulchre (Italian: Basilica del Santo Sepolcro) is a Catholic place of worship located in the territory of the Italian municipality of Barletta, in the province of Barletta-Andria-Trani in Apulia.

== History ==
The first document that attests with certainty the existence of the church dates back to 1130 (the same year in which the Order of Canons of the Holy Sepulchre was recognized by Pope Innocent II).

In 1138, another papal bull by Pope Innocent II indicated the location of the church for the first time. In 1144, reference is made to the foundation of the temple by the Knights of the Holy Sepulchre who, returning from Palestine, had built it, together with other religious and civil buildings throughout Apulia.

One of the last papal documents that would attribute the presence of the church of the Holy Sepulchre to Barletta is the papal bull of 14 July 1182 with which, referring to the prior of Jerusalem the possessions of the patriarchal church, the Pope cites the church of the Holy Sepulchre apud Barlettum.
