= Barletta Lighthouse =

Lighthouse in Italy

Faro di Barletta
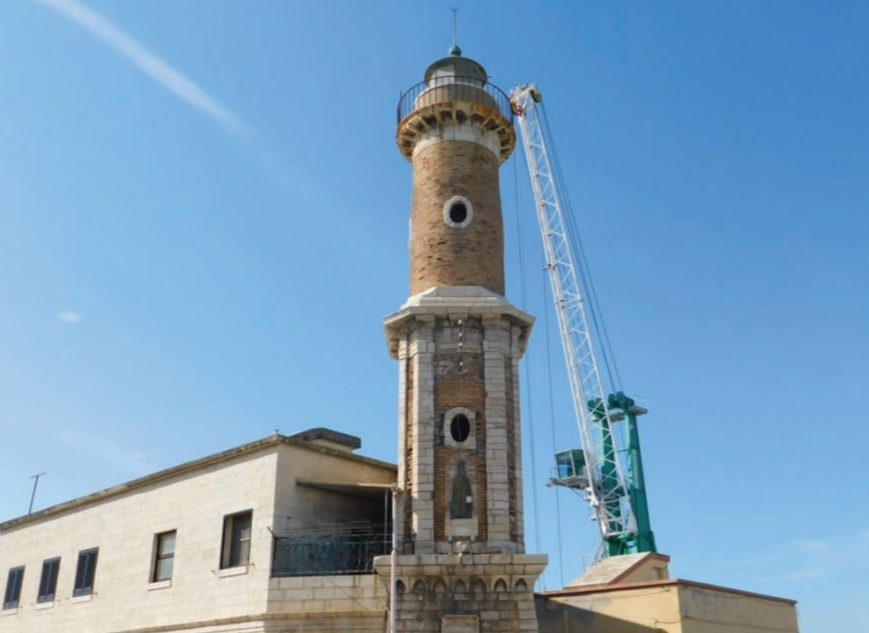
- Barletta Lighthouse
- Location: Barletta; Apulia; Italy
- Coordinates: 41°19′08″N 16°16′55″E
- Constructed: 1807
- Foundation: masonry base
- Construction: masonry tower
- Height: 15 metres (49 ft)
- Shape: cylindrical tower with lantern and gallery
- Markings: white tower
- Operator: Adaspm

Light
- Focal height: 33 metres (108 ft)
- Lens: Fresnel lens (modernized)
- Light source: mains power
- Intensity: unspecified
- Range: 15 nautical miles (28 km; 17 mi)
- Characteristic: Fl W 5s

Barletta Lighthouse is an inactive lighthouse located at the entrance of the Port of Barletta, on the Adriatic coast of southern Italy.

== Description ==
Originally built in 1750 during the Napoleonic period was rebuilt, it represents one of the earliest modern maritime signaling structures along the Apulian coast and has played a strategic role in navigation and port safety for over two centuries.

The lighthouse consists of a white masonry tower topped by a lantern and gallery, rising directly from the harbor area. Over time, it has undergone several technical upgrades, including the installation of modern optical systems and electrification, while preserving its original navigational function. For more than two centuries, the Barletta Lighthouse has remained a key landmark for maritime traffic and an integral part of the city’s coastal and port heritage.

== See also ==
- List of lighthouses in Italy
