= Column of Marcian =

Monumental column in Istanbul, Turkey

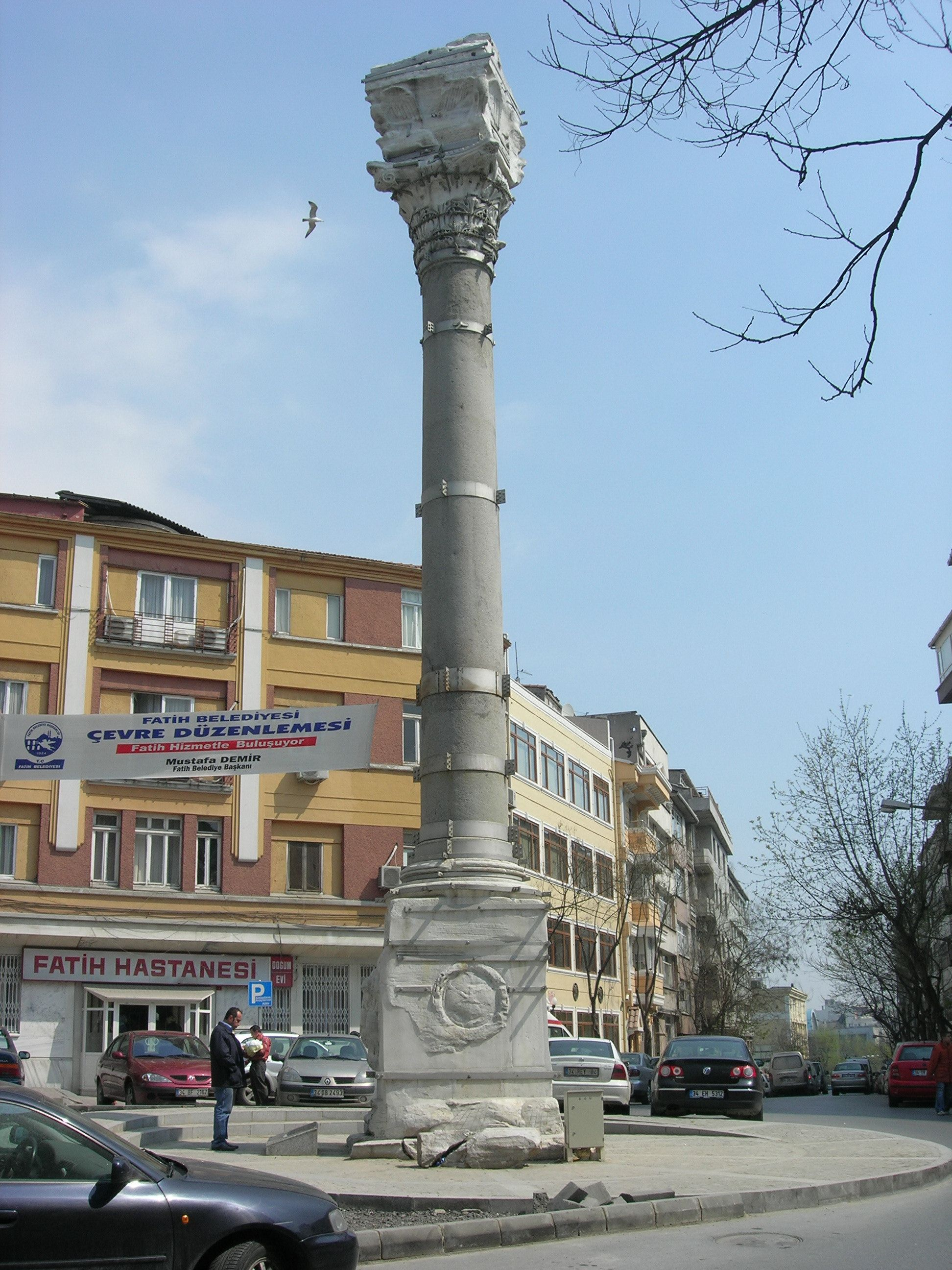
- Column of Marcian in 2007.

- Location within Istanbul Fatih
- 41°00′56″N 28°57′01″E
- Location: Fatih, Istanbul, Turkey.

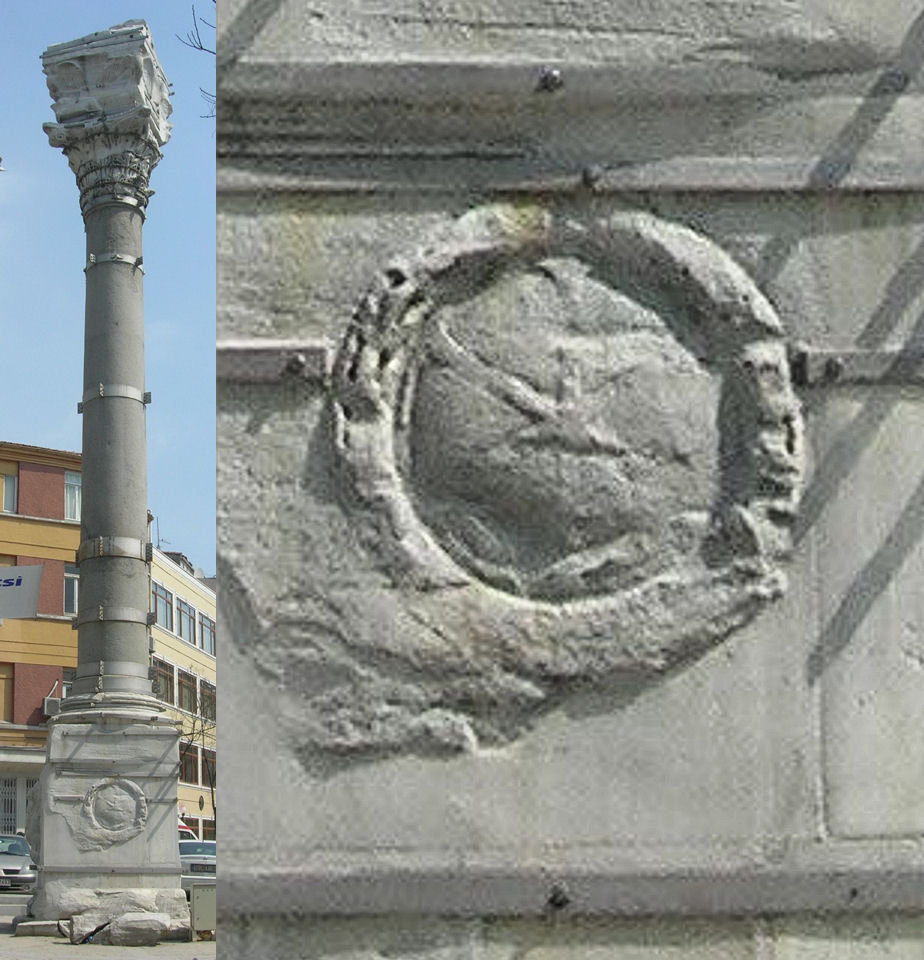
One of the faded IX monograms inside a wreath at the base of the column.

The Column of Marcian (Greek: Στήλη του Μαρκιανού, Turkish: Kıztaşı) is a Roman honorific column erected in Constantinople by the praefectus urbi Tatianus (450 – c. 452) and dedicated to the Emperor Marcian (450–57). It is located in the present-day Fatih district of Istanbul. The column is not documented in any late Roman or Byzantine source and its history has to be inferred from its location, style and dedicatory inscription.

== History ==
The column is carved from red-grey Egyptian granite, in two sections. The quadrilateral basis is encased by four slabs of white marble. Three faces are decorated with IX monograms within medallions, and the fourth with two genii supporting a globe. The column is topped by a Corinthian capital, decorated with aquilae. The inscription confirms that the capital was originally surmounted by a statue of Marcian, in continuation of an imperial architectural tradition initiated by the Column of Trajan and the Column of Marcus Aurelius in Rome. The basis of the column is orientated northwest/southeast, while its capital is aligned north/south, possibly so that the statue could look towards the nearby Church of the Holy Apostles.

A Latin dedicatory inscription is engraved on the northern side of the basis. Its lettering was originally filled with bronze, which has since been removed. The inscription reads:

[PR]INCIPIS HANC STATUAM MARCIANI | CERNE TORUMQUE |
[PRAE]FECTUS VOVIT QUOD TATIANUS | OPUS

(Behold this statue of the princeps Marcian and its base,
a work dedicated by the prefect Tatianus.)

The Turkish name Kıztaşı, "the column of the girl" (kız: "girl" + taş: "stone"), apparently derives from the genii on the basis, which during the Ottoman period were the column's most distinguishing features (after the loss of Marcian's statue).

== Gallery ==
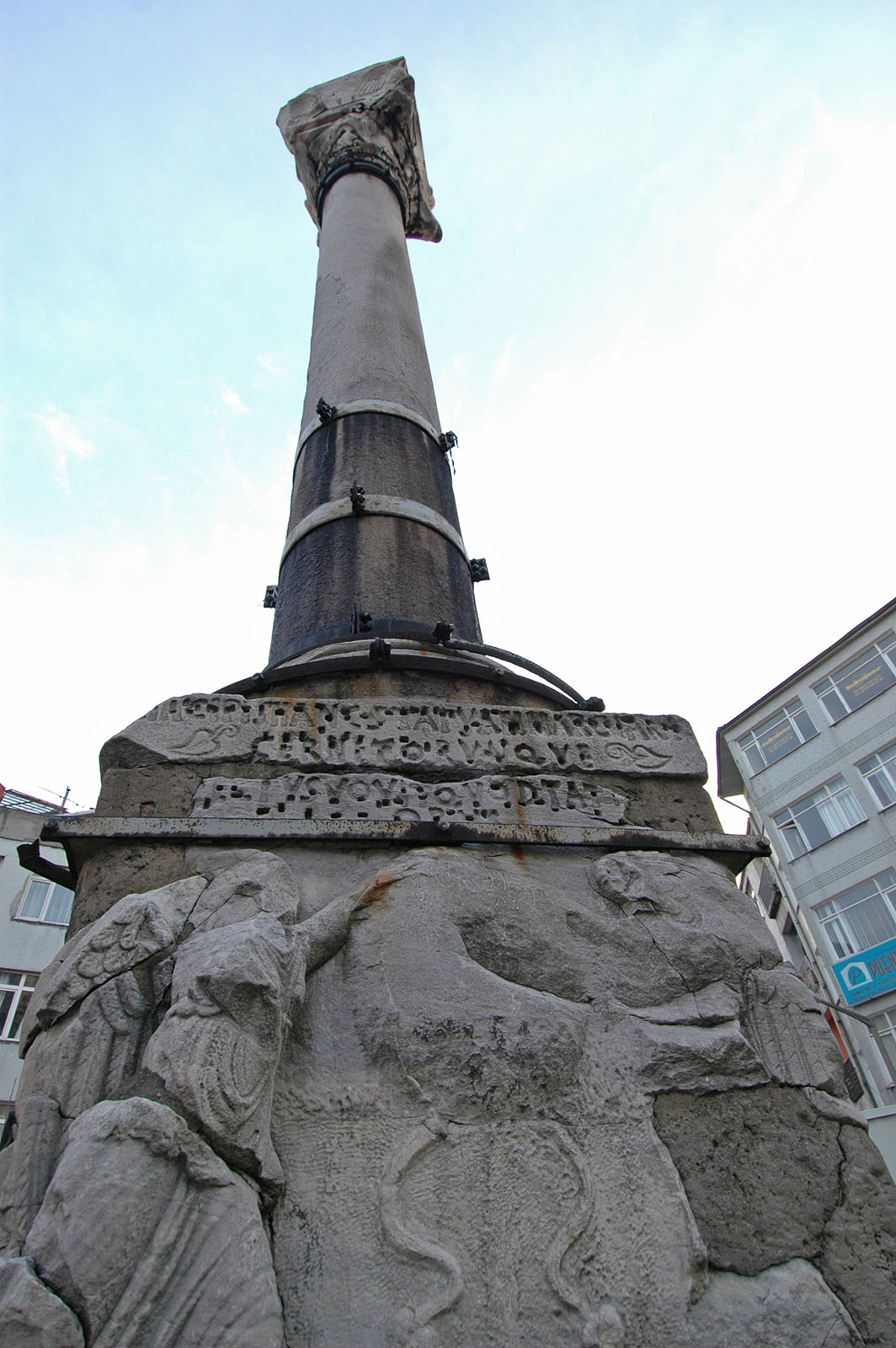
Marcian Column Victory at base

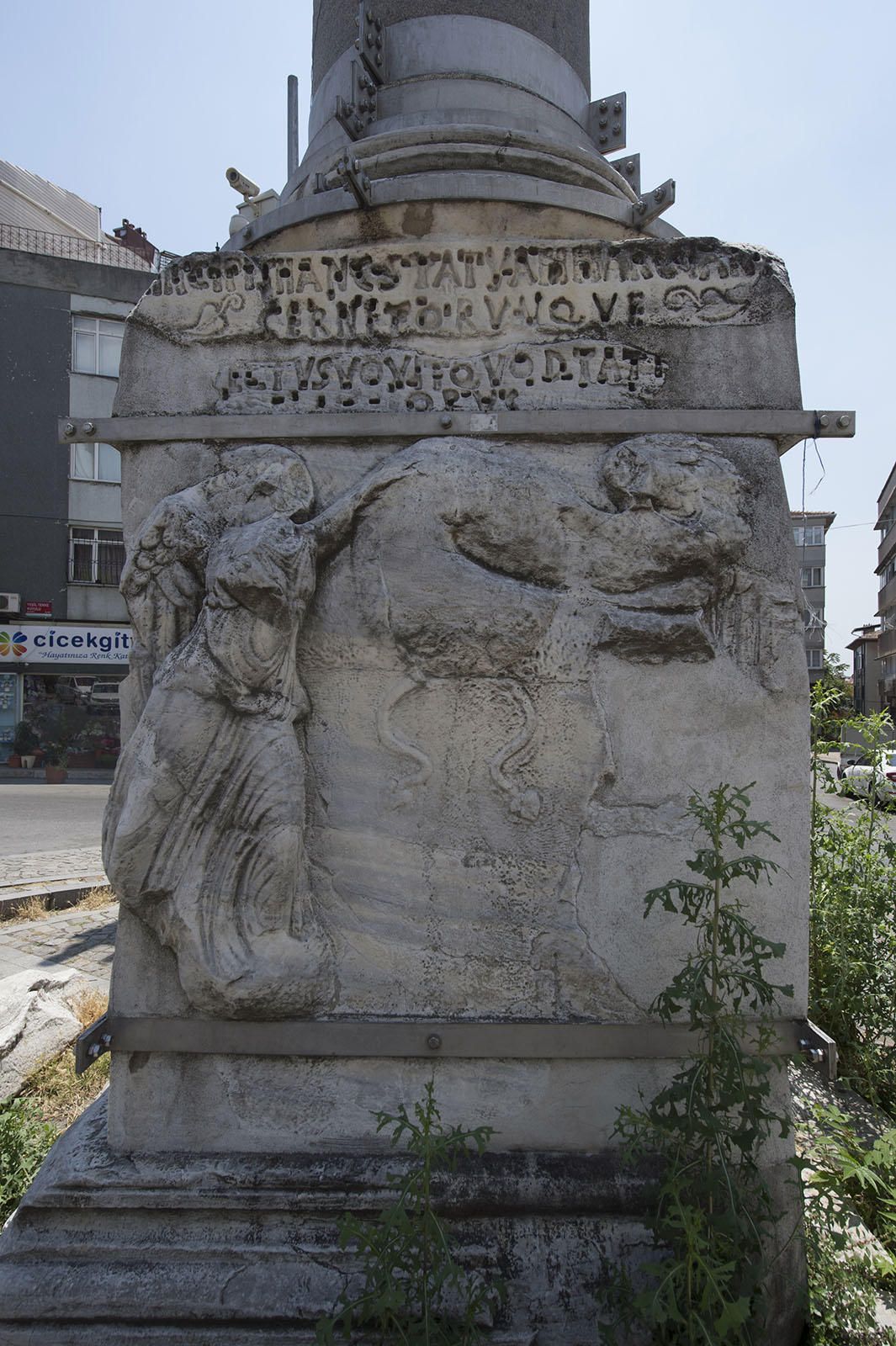
Istanbul Marcian Column Victory at base

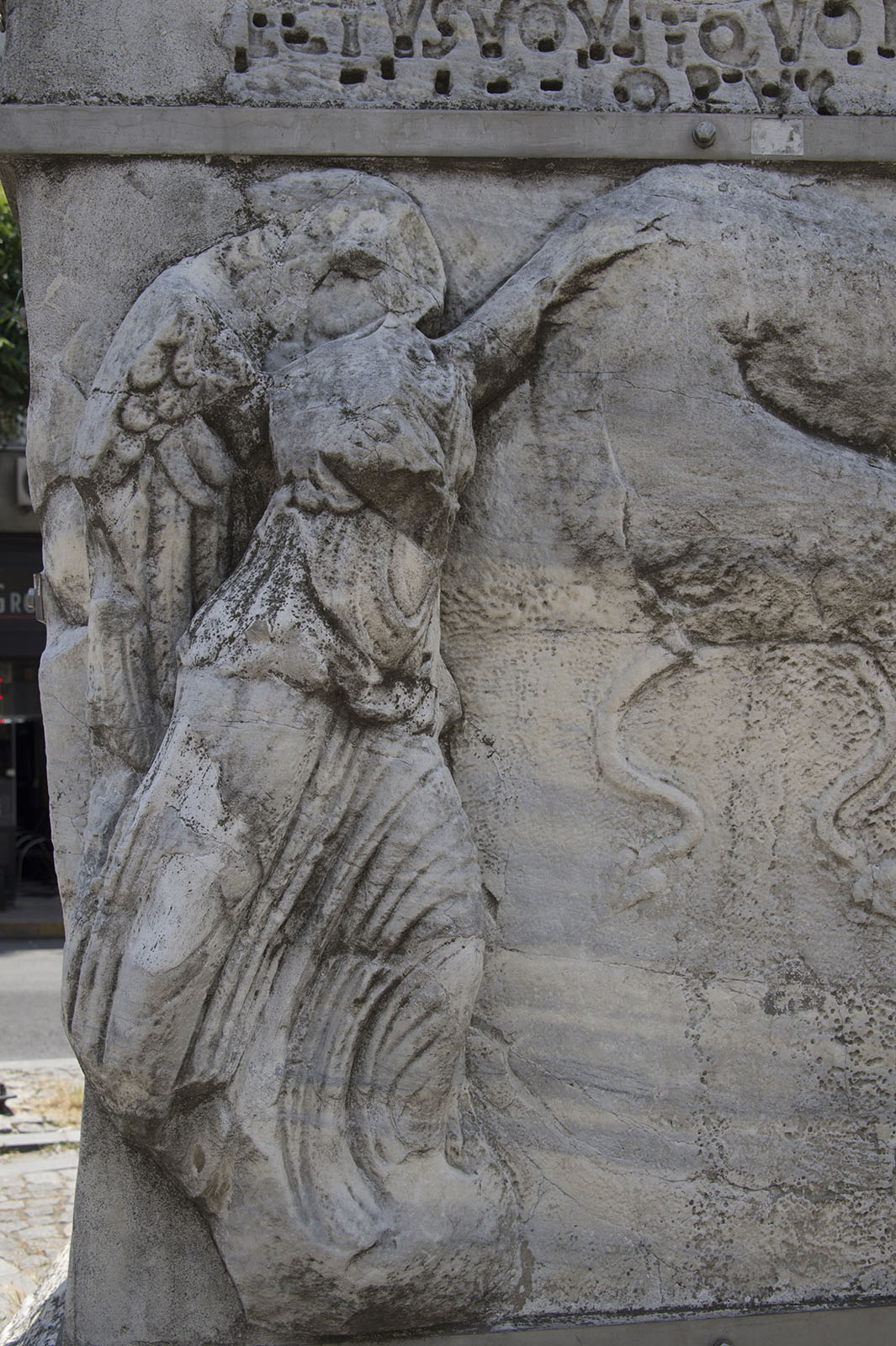
Istanbul Marcian Column Victory at base

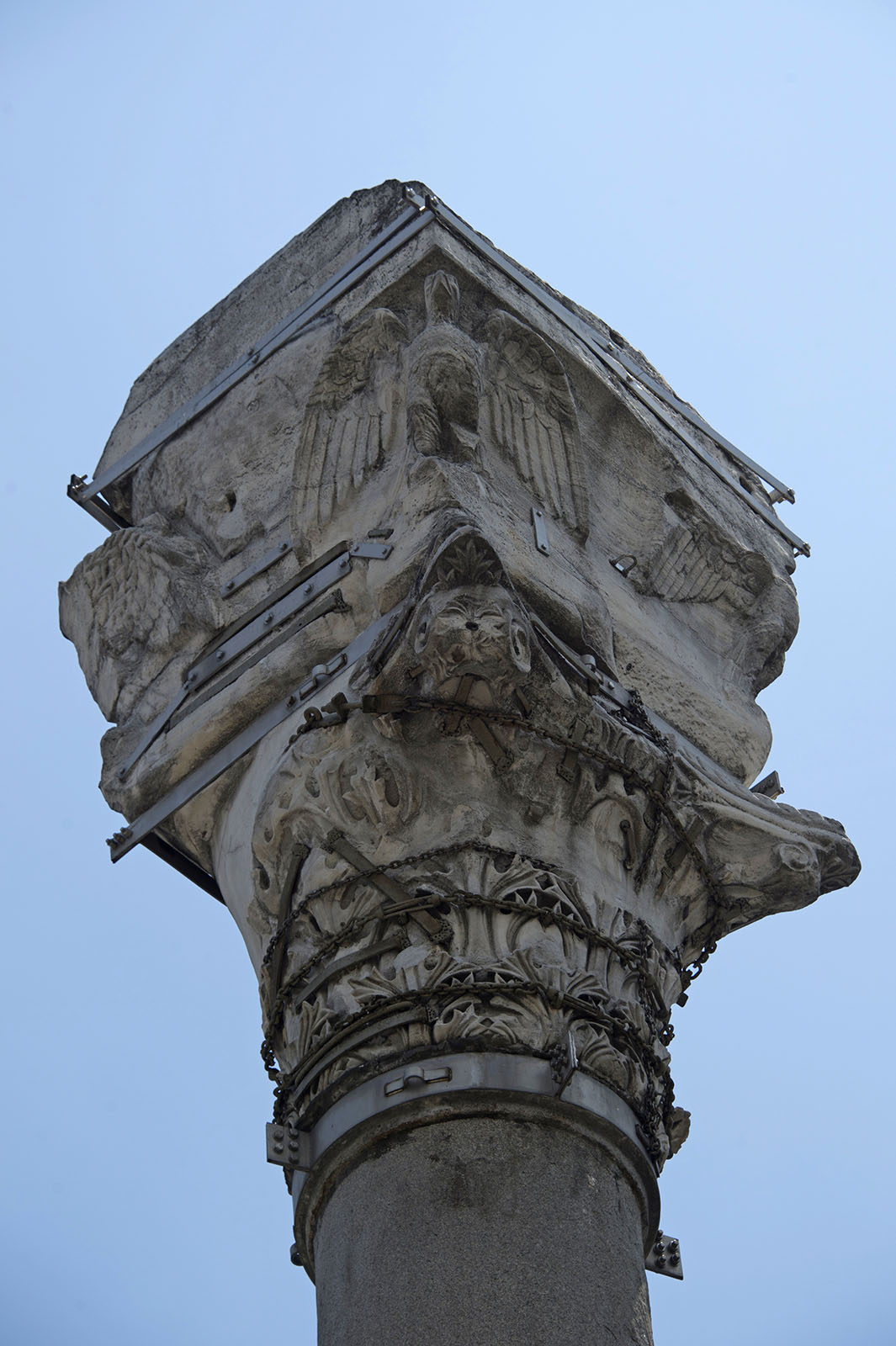
Istanbul Marcian Column Plint with eagles

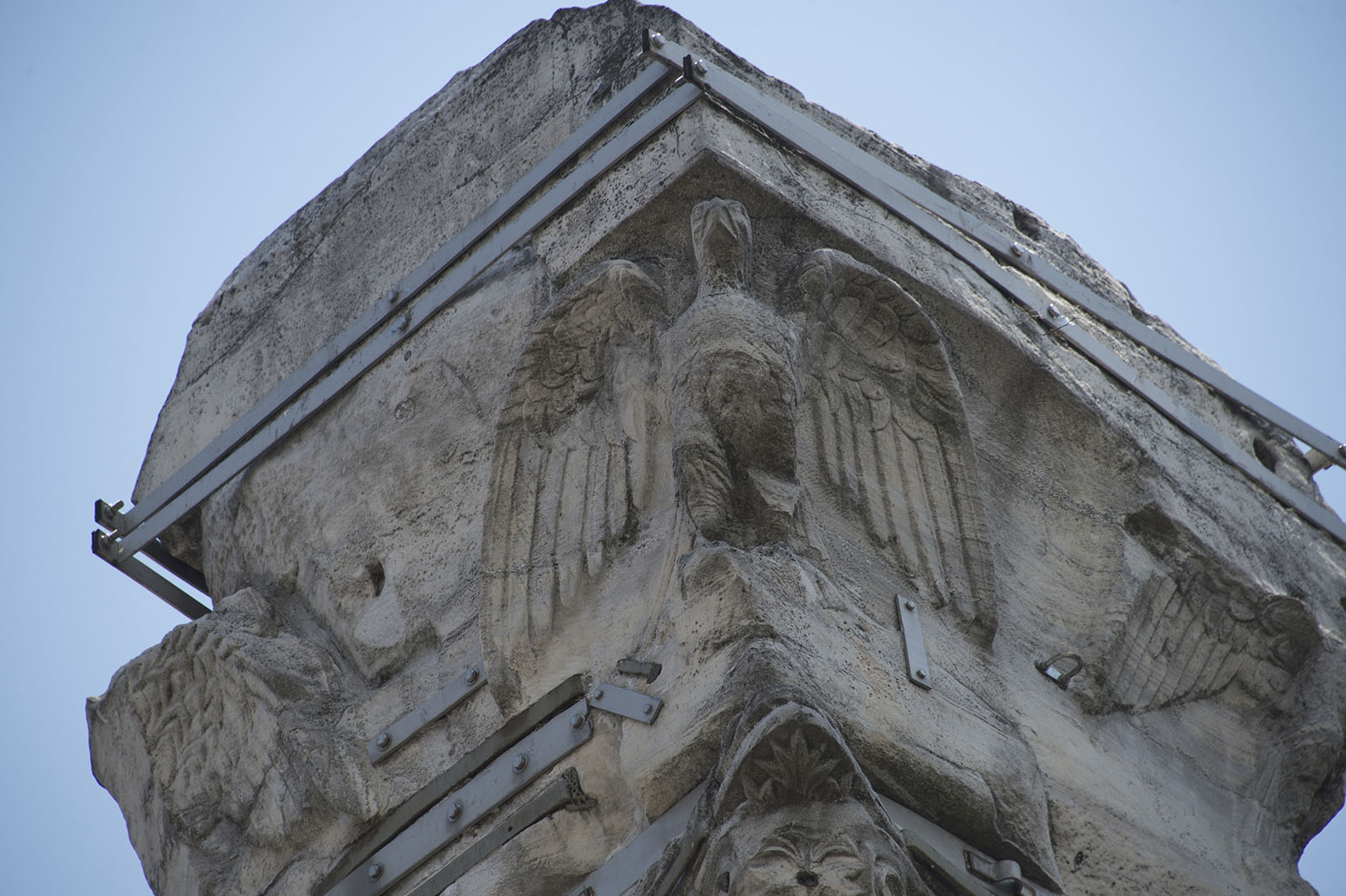
Istanbul Marcian Column Plint with eagles detail

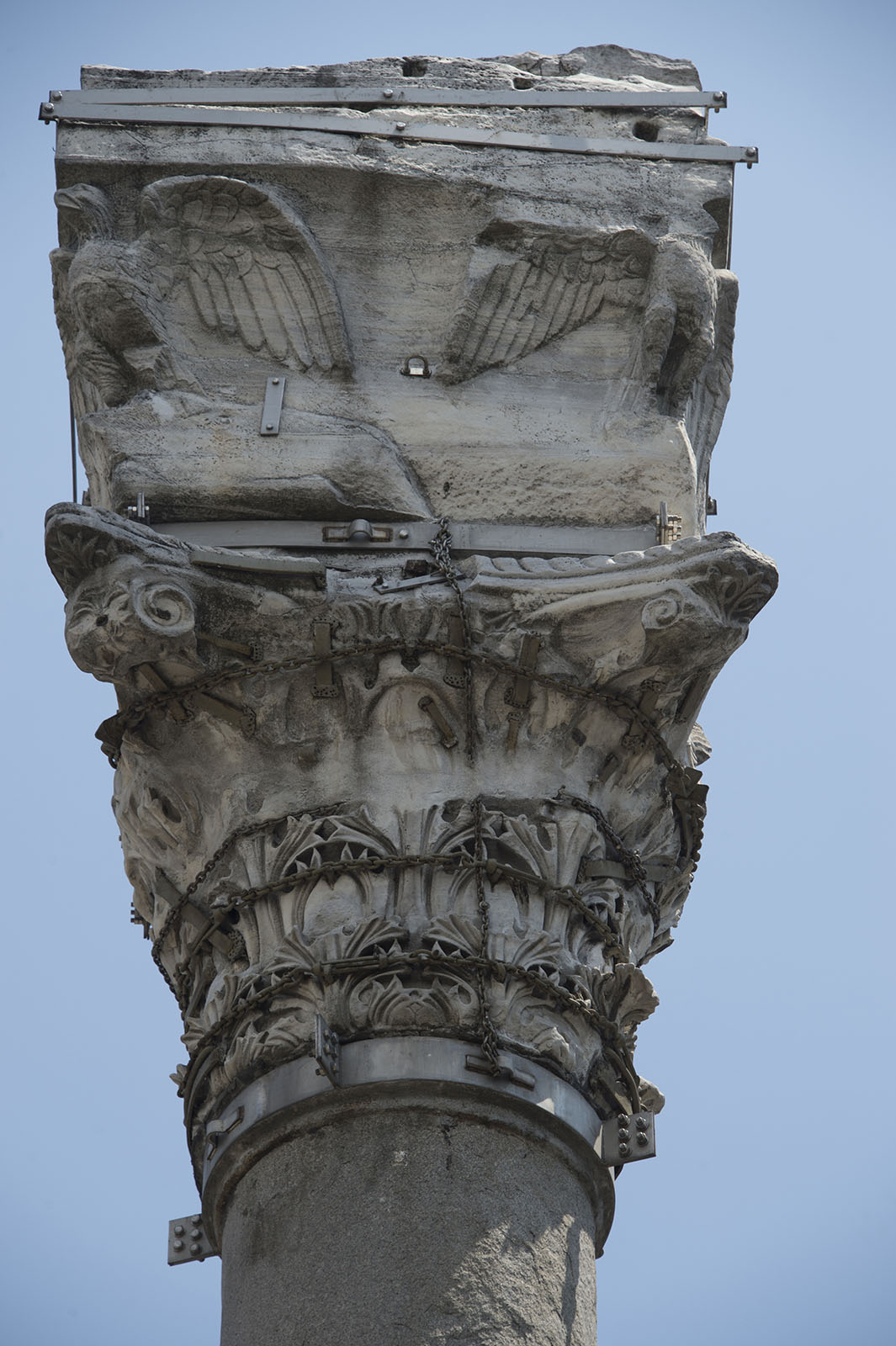
Istanbul Marcian Column Plint with eagles

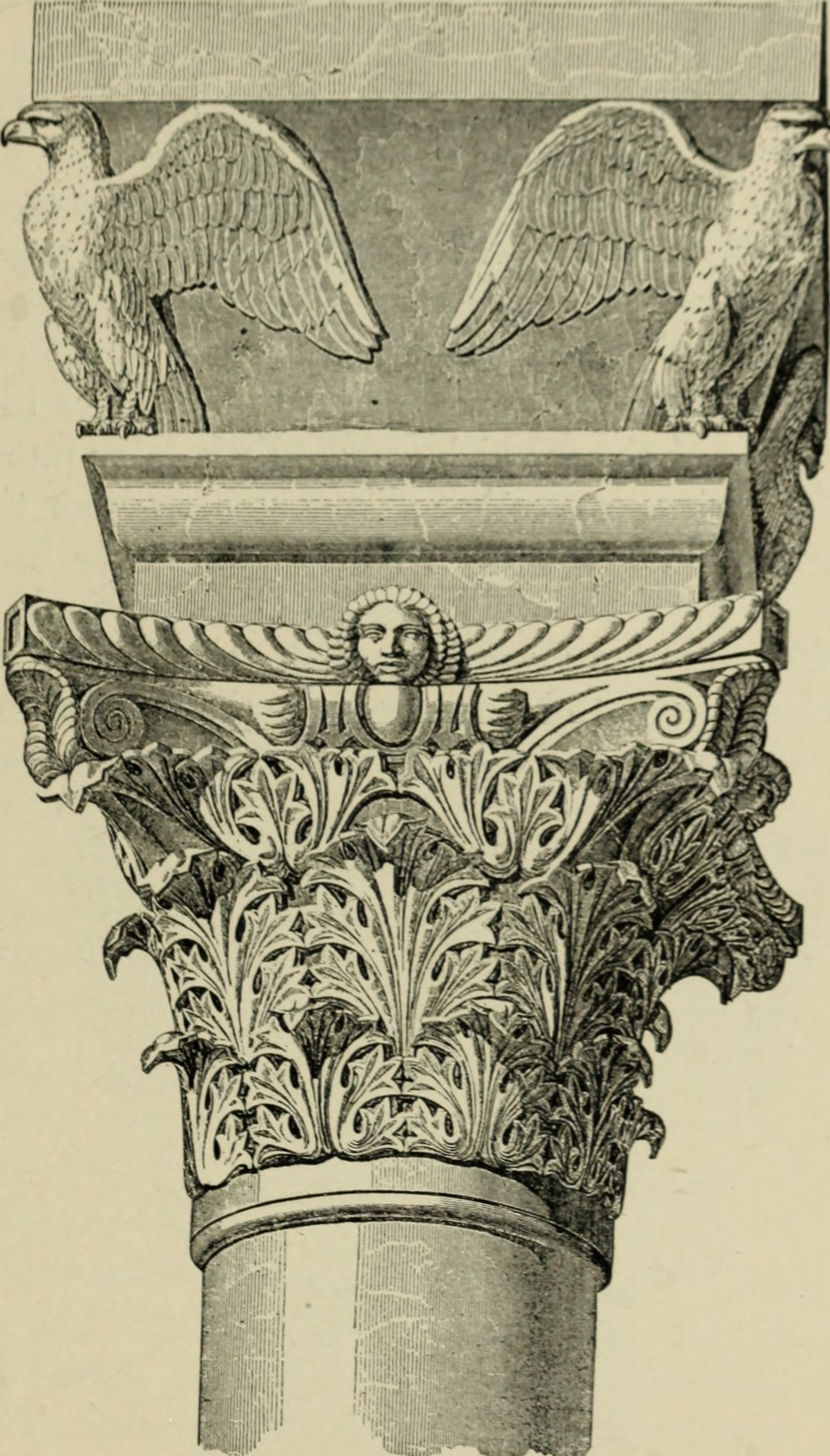
The Marcian Column in antiquity

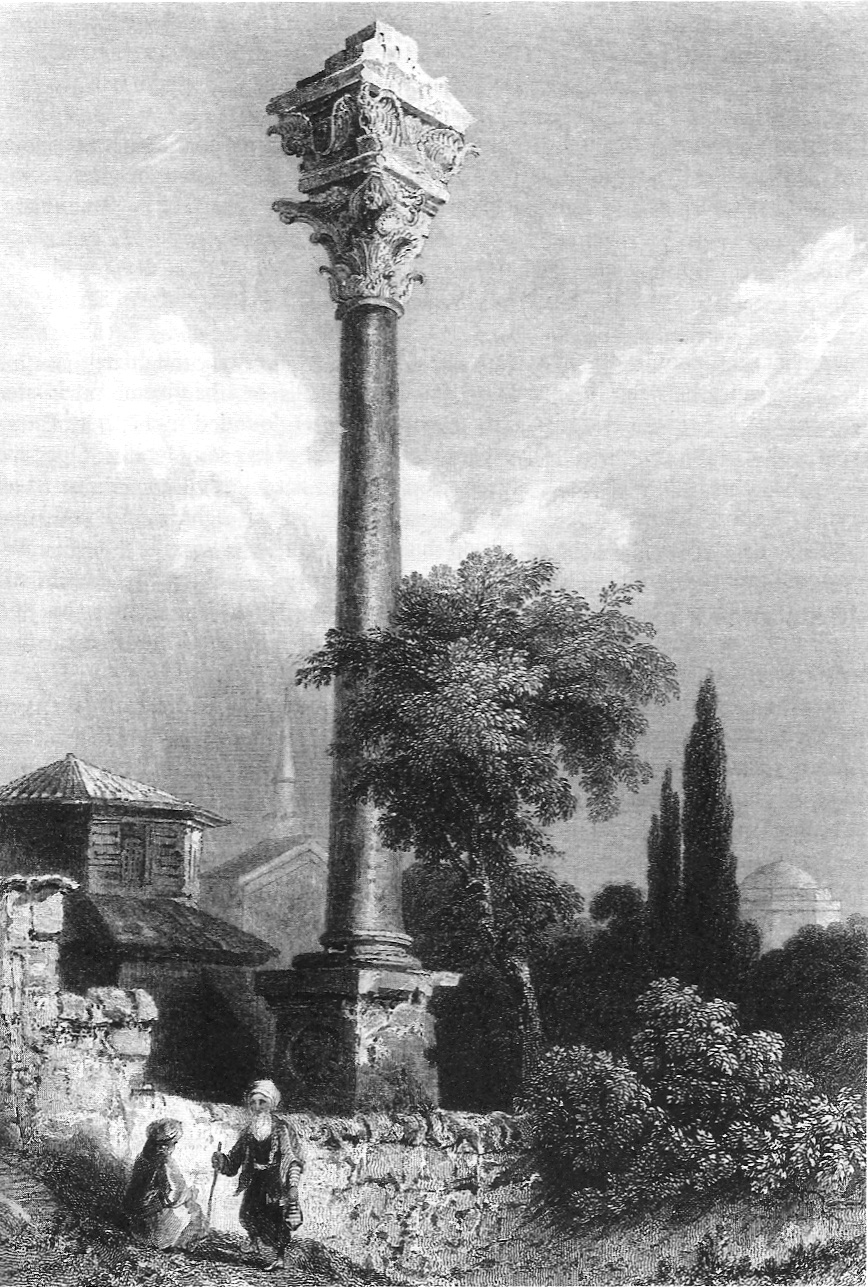
Mid 19 century engraving Column of Marcian.
