= D'Ascenzo =

D'Ascenzo is an Italian surname. Notable people with the surname include:

- Denise D'Ascenzo (1958–2019), American news anchor
- Leonardo D'Ascenzo (born 1961), Italian Roman Catholic prelate
- Nicola D'Ascenzo (1871–1954), Italian-born American artist

== See also ==
- Giovanni D'Ascenzi (1920–2013), Italian Roman Catholic prelate
