= Cozzoli =

Cozzoli is an Italian surname. Notable people with the surname include:

- Mauro Cozzoli (born 1946), Italian Roman Catholic priest, theologian, and writer
- Michele Cozzoli (1915–1961), Italian composer, conductor, and arranger
