= Bisceglie station =

Bisceglie station may refer to:

- Bisceglie railway station, Province of Barletta-Andria-Trani, Apulia
- Bisceglie (Milan Metro)
