= Trani Cathedral =

Cathedral in Trani, Apulia, Italy

Coordinates: 41.2822°N 16.4184°E

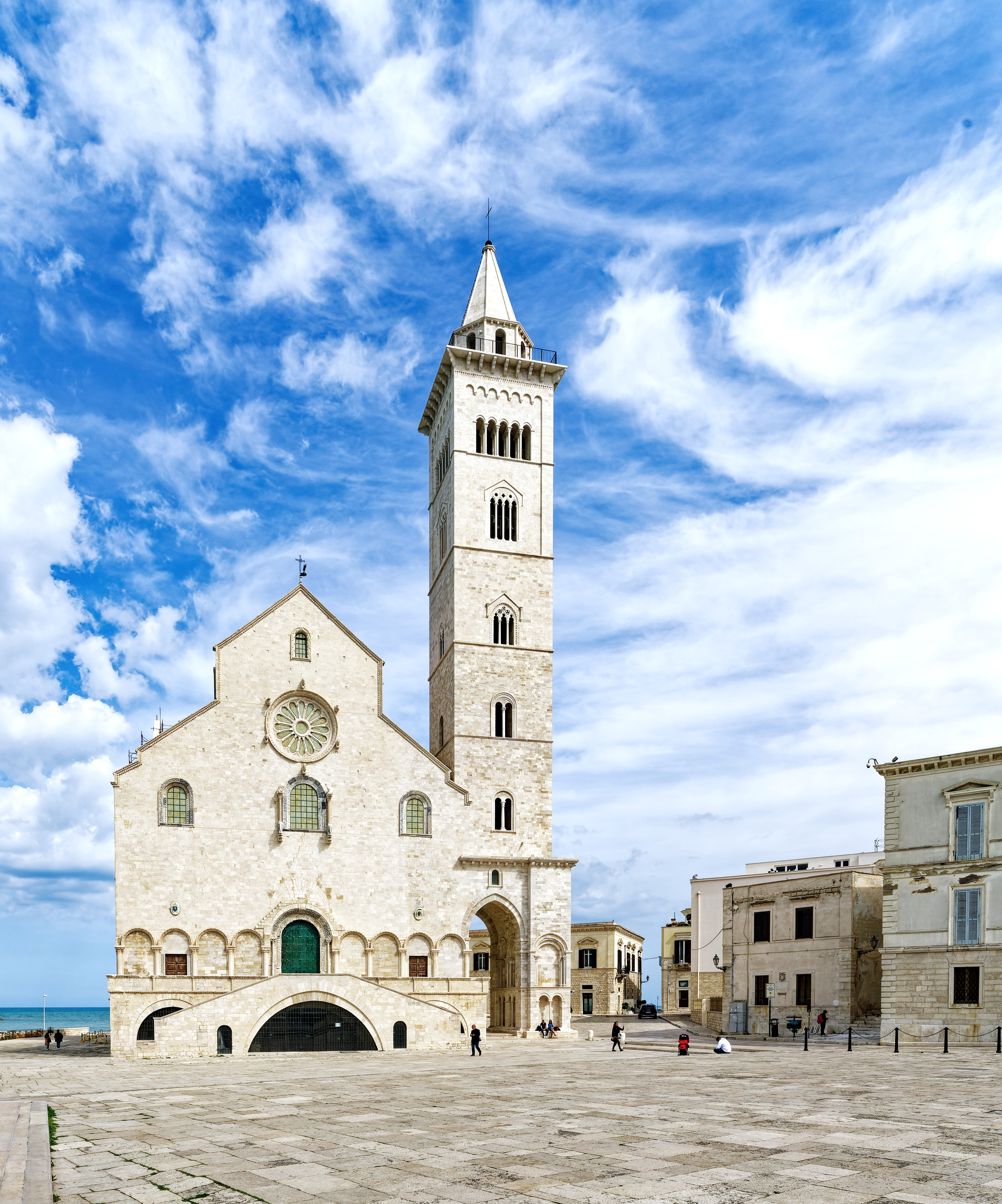
West front of Trani Cathedral, with the bell tower.

Trani Cathedral (Italian: Cattedrale di Trani; Basilica cattedrale di Santa Maria Assunta; Cattedrale di San Nicola Pellegrino) is a Latin Catholic cathedral dedicated to Saint Nicholas the Pilgrim in Trani, Apulia, south-eastern Italy. Formerly the seat of the archbishop of Trani, it is now that of the archbishop of Trani-Barletta-Bisceglie. Consecrated in 1143, is one of the main examples of Apulian Romanesque architecture.

It was built using the local stone of Trani, typical of the region: a calcareous tuff, obtained from the caves of the city, characterised by its colour, an extremely light pink, almost white.

The cathedral is distinguished by its showy transept and by its use of the high pointed arch in the passage beneath the bell tower, which is unusual in Romanesque architecture.

== History ==
Construction began in 1099, over the earlier church of Santa Maria della Scala, which went back to the 4th century. The relics of Saint Leucius were kept here until the 8th century, when they were translated to Brindisi. The new church was intended to house the relics of Saint Nicholas the Pilgrim (who died in Trani in 1094). The cathedral was dedicated as soon as they were installed, without waiting for the building to be completed.

The decisive stage of construction probably took place between about 1159 and 1186 under the leadership of Bishop Bertrando II, and the building was complete by about 1200, except for the bell tower, which was only finished in the 14th century.

== Description ==
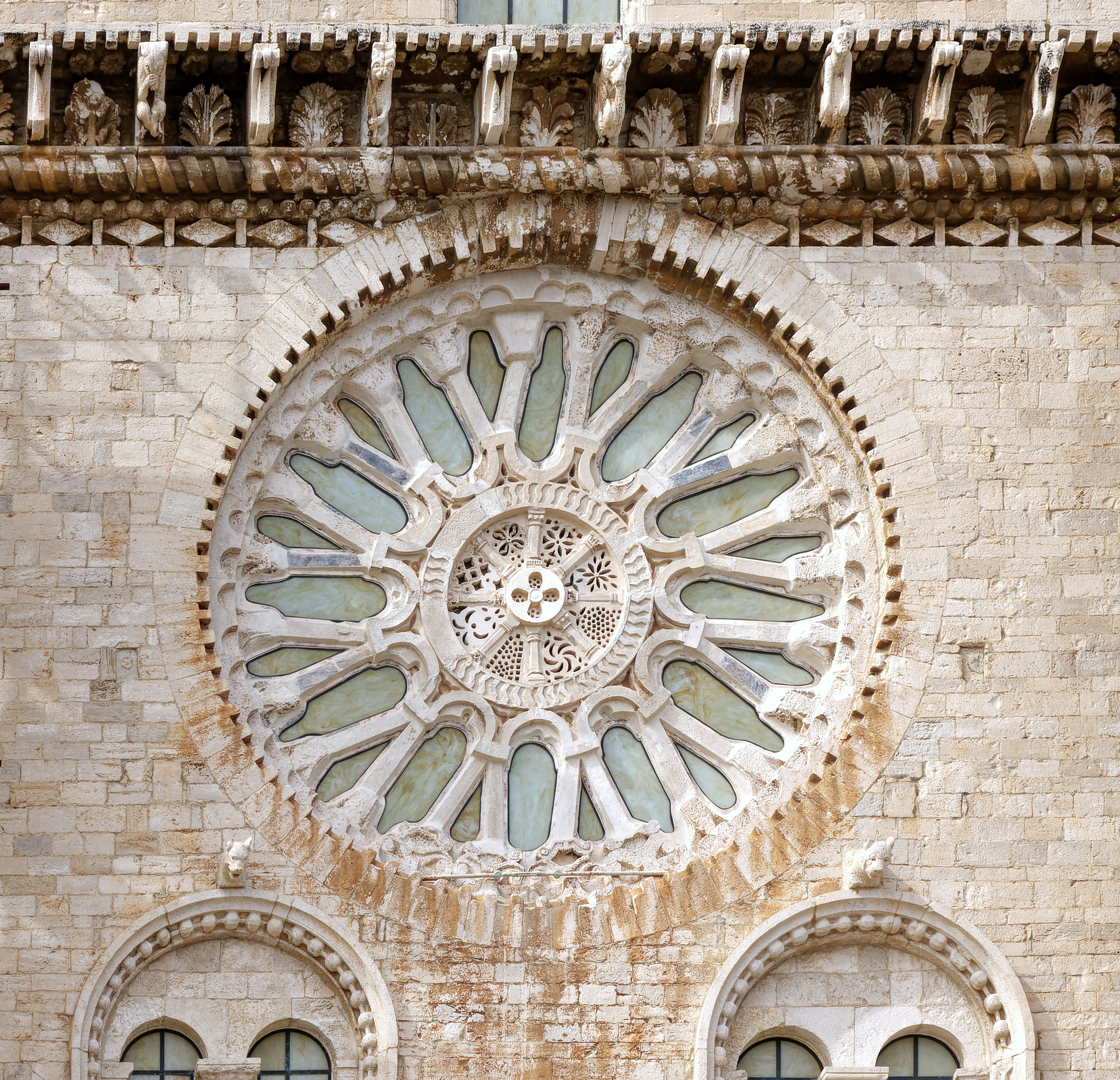
The rosette on the back side.

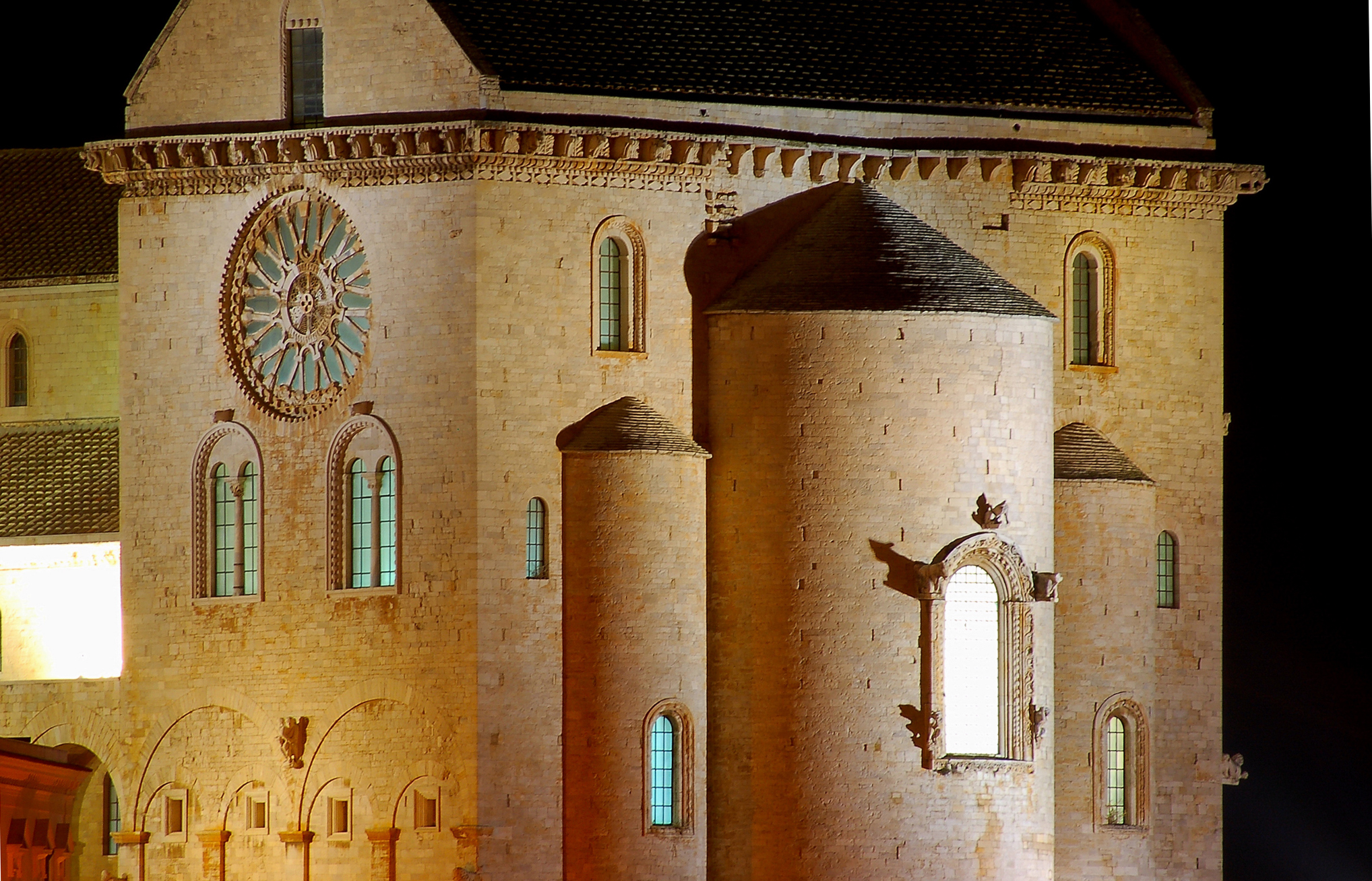
The transept area.

=== Exterior ===
The church is located on a relatively isolated position, a few meters from the coast. The main pavement is at some 5 meters above the external ground level, as the nave and the two aisles are built above a crypt corresponding to the original church.

The façade is accessed through a double staircase, at both sides of the Romanesque-style portal, leading to a gallery; the portal, within a blind arcade, has a decoration with some influence from Islamic art. The central bronze door was executed by Barisano da Trani in 1175; the original piece is now inside the church, while the external one is a replica made in 2012.

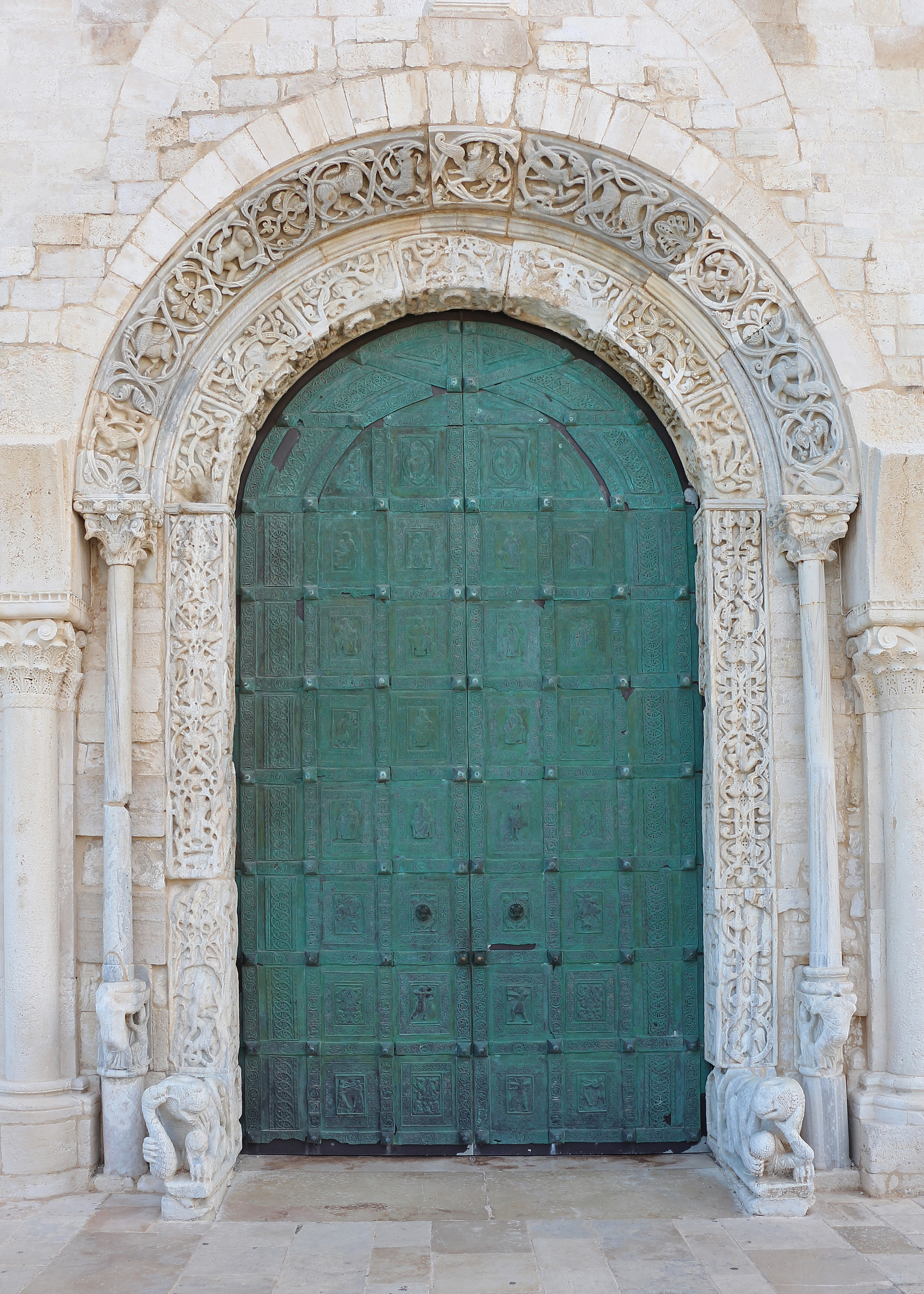
The main portal.

The façade is completed by three windows and a small rose window above the nave. They are decorated by animal figures.

The transept, facing the sea, has three apses, and also features blind arcades in Romanesque style. The side façades are also decorated with blind arcades and, on the southern side, by two mullioned windows and a rose window, while the northern side as two double and one quadruple mullioned windows.

The bell tower, standing at 59 m, was mostly built in 1230–1239, although the floors above the second one were completed only in the 14th century under bishop Giacomo Tura Scottini. As is typical in Romanesque structures, the openings (in the shape of mullioned windows) become wider in the upper floors.

The ground floor of the bell tower has an internal, ogival arcade creating a passage under it. The bell tower was completely dismantled and rebuilt in the 1950s to avoid it falling down.

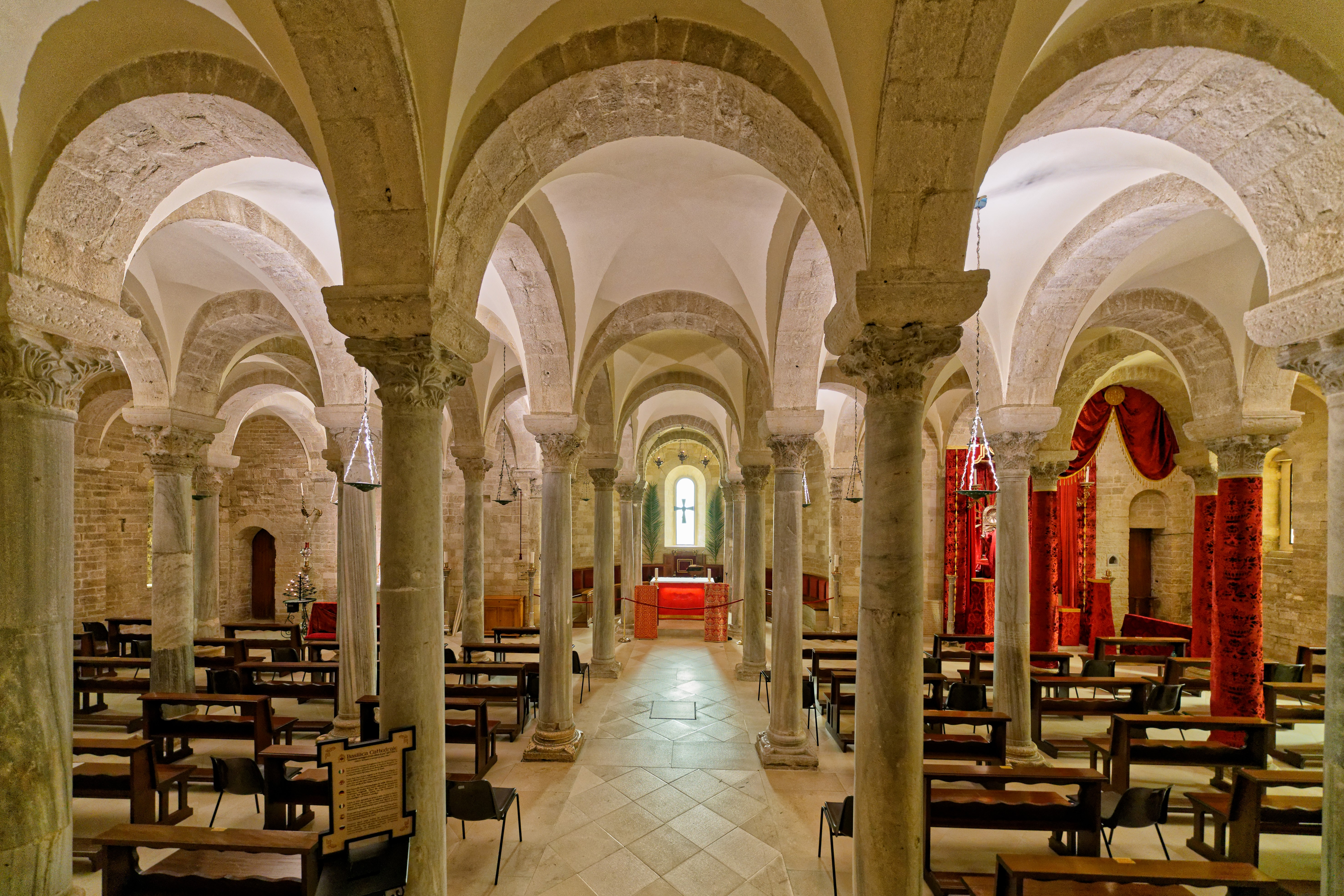
View of the central nave.

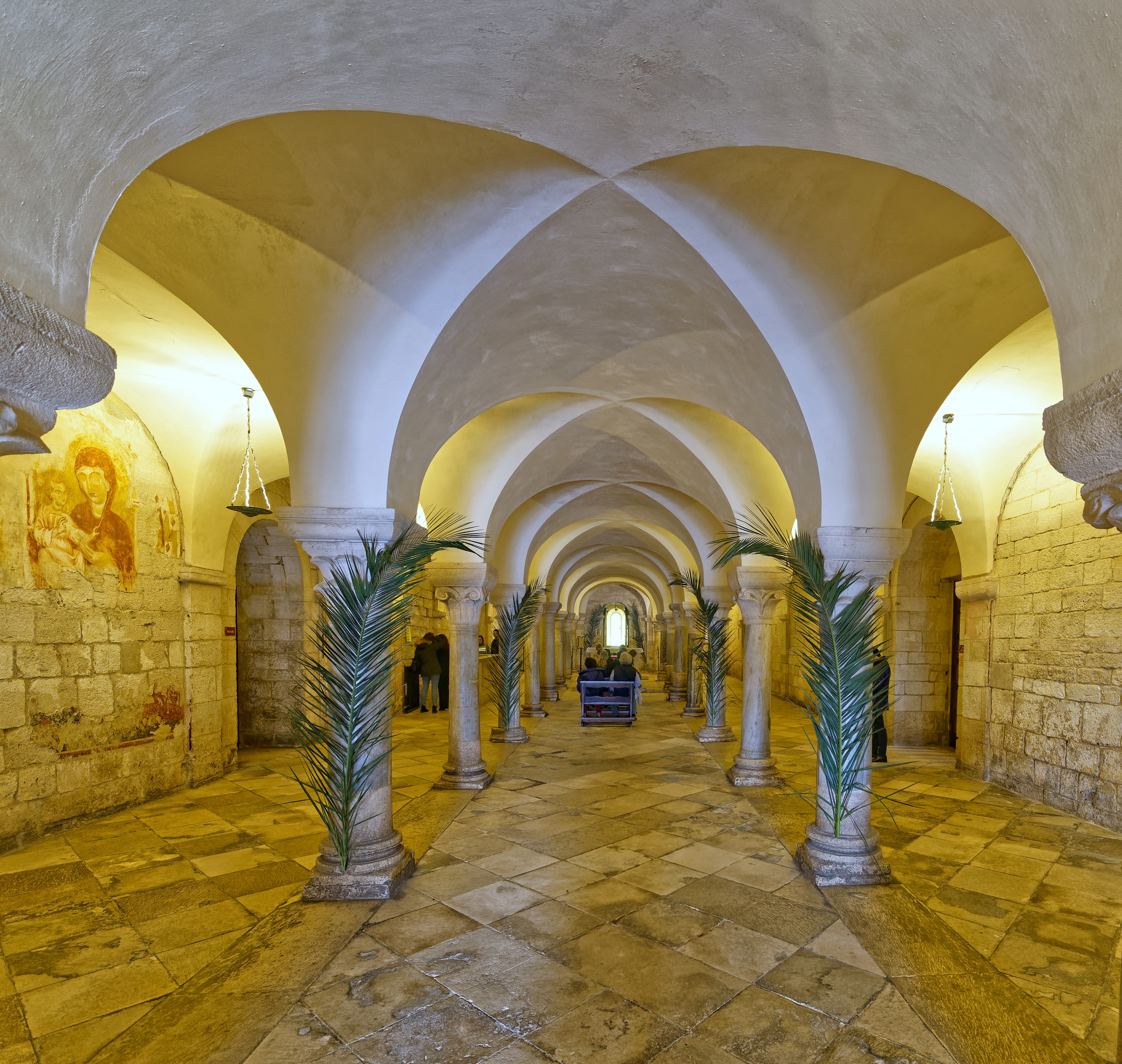
Interior of the Crypt of St. Nicholas.

=== Interior ===
The church plan has a nave and two aisles, separated by double columns that support two side matronaei. The aisles have cross vaulted ceilings, while the nave has nude trusses. The transept has also similar trusses.

The interior has lost much of its decoration, leading to the current largely bare appearance. In particular, the restoration in 1939-1942 mostly left only the medieval elements, removing later additions such as the painted wooden ceiling of the nave and the transept.

Only part of the original mosaics of the pavement, inspired by those of the Otranto Cathedral, remain in the presbytery area. These include scenes such as the allegory of Alexander the Great flying to heaven (see below) and the original sin episode with Adam and Eve.

The lower church, located under the main pavement, is divided into two main spaces: the Crypt of St. Nicholas, housing the saint's relics, and that of St. Mary. The lower church has a similar plan that the upper one and has Romanesque-style capitals. A small stairs leads to the hypogeum of St. Leucius, located below the sea level and decorated with frescoes in poor state of preservation.

==== Flying Alexander ====
A medieval legend in the Alexander romance had Alexander, wishing to see the whole world, first descending into the depths of the ocean in a sort of diving bell, then wanting to see the view from above. To do this he harnessed two large birds, or griffins in other versions, with a seat for him between them. To entice them to keep flying higher he placed meat on two skewers which he held above their heads. This was quite commonly depicted in several medieval cultures, from Europe to Persia, where it may reflect earlier legends or iconographies. Sometimes the beasts are not shown, just the king holding two sticks with flower-like blobs at their ends. The scene is shown in the floor mosaics of both Trani and Otranto Cathedrals.

== Sources ==
- Rachele Carrino, 1996: Il mosaico pavimentale medioevale della cattedrale di Trani, in: "XLII Corso di Cultura sull'arte ravennate e bizantina, Ravenna: 1995 (CARB 42)" (pp. 175–214). Ravenna
- Rolf Legler, 1989 (3rd edition): Apulien (pp. 172 et seq). Cologne
