= Archdiocese of Trani-Barletta-Bisceglie =

Latin Catholic jurisdiction in Apulia, Italy

Coordinates: 41.2667°N 16.4167°E

Archdiocese of Trani-Barletta-Bisceglie (-Nazareth) Archidioecesis Tranensis-Barolensis-Vigiliensis (-Nazarensis)

Catholic
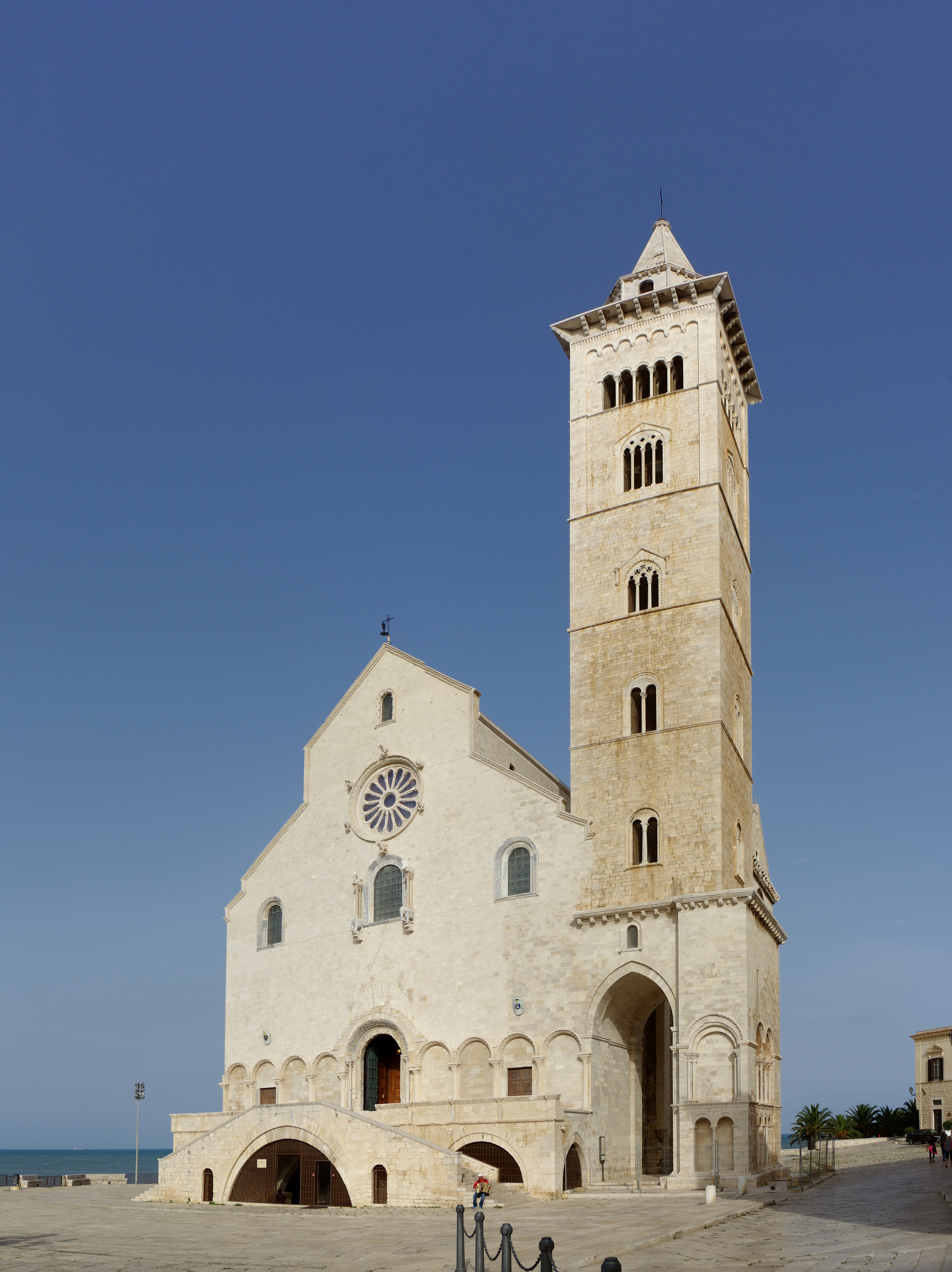
- Trani Cathedral

Location
- Country: Italy
- Ecclesiastical province: Bari-Bitonto

Statistics
- Area: 701 km^{2} (271 sq mi)
- Population: Total; Catholics: (as of 2023); 287,048 ▼; 276,612 ▼
- Parishes: 66

Information
- Denomination: Catholic Church
- Sui iuris church: Latin Church
- Rite: Roman Rite
- Established: 6th Century
- Cathedral: Trani Cathedral
- Co-cathedral: Bisceglie Cathedral, Barletta Cathedral
- Secular priests: 119 (diocesan) ▲18 (Religious Orders) ▼27 (Deacons) ▲

Current leadership
- Pope: Leo XIV
- Archbishop: Leonardo D'Ascenzo

Map
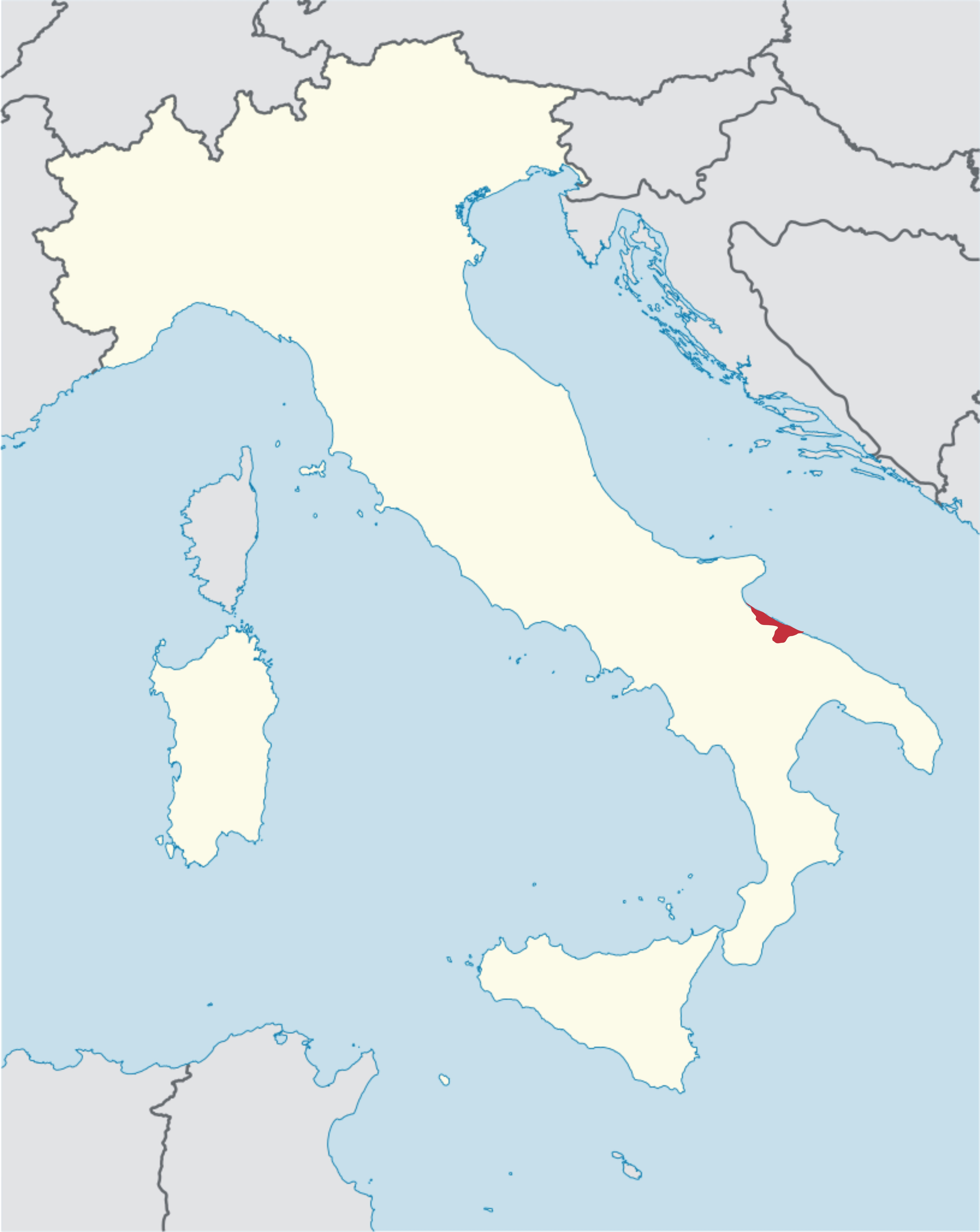

Website
- Diocesan Web Site (in Italian)

The Archdiocese of Trani-Barletta-Bisceglie (Latin: Archidioecesis Tranensis-Barolensis-Vigiliensis (-Nazarensis)) is a Latin Church ecclesiastical territory or archdiocese of the Catholic Church in Italy in the province of Barletta-Andria-Trani in Apulia. Formerly a metropolitan see, in 1980 it became a suffragan archdiocese in the ecclesiastical province of the metropolitan Archdiocese of Bari-Bitonto. It received its current name in 1986, when the Archdiocese of Trani (suffragan until 1063) added to its title the names of two suppressed dioceses merged into it.

== Special churches ==
The Archdiocese's archiepiscopal cathedral is Basilica Cattedrale di S. Nicola Pellegrino, a minor basilica, in Trani.

The Archdiocese also includes three Co-cathedrals, in the two bishoprics whose titles it adopted: they are Basilica Concattedrale di S. Maria Maggiore, located in Barletta, Basilica Concattedrale di S. Pietro Apostolo, in Bisceglie (both also Minor basilicas) and Concattedrale di S. Maria di Nazareth, again in Barletta.

Furthermore, the archdiocese comprises another Minor Basilica: Basilica del San Sepolcro, in Barletta, and two Former Cathedrals: Chiesa San Giacomo Maggiore, in Barletta, and Ex cattedrale San Stefano, in Trinitapoli.

== History ==
- Established circa 250 as Diocese of Trani (Italian) / Tranen(sis) (Latin), without known precursor see
- Gained territory in 844 from Diocese of Canosa
- Promoted in 1063 as Metropolitan Archdiocese of Trani (Italiano) / Tranen(sis) (Latin)
- Lost territories in 1100 to Metropolitan Archdiocese of Nazareth, and to establish Diocese of Andria
- Lost territory in 1327 to establish Metropolitan Archdiocese of Nazareth in Barletta (at the ancient Barduli).
- Gained territory in 1424 from the suppressed Diocese of Salpi, lost it again in 1523 to (re)establish the Diocese of Salpi and on 1547.04.22 gained it back from the (again) suppressed Diocese of Salpi
- Gained territories on 1818.06.27 from the suppressed above Metropolitan daughter Archdiocese of Nazareth in Barletta and from the Diocese of Canne, and gained the 'adopted' title of Nazareth [dropping in Barletta]
- Lost territory on 1860.04.21 to (re)establish the Archdiocese of Barletta
- Demoted on 1980.10.20 as non-metropolitan Archdiocese of Trani (Italiano) / Tranen(sis) (Latin)
- Renamed on 1986.09.30 as Archdiocese of Trani–Barletta–Bisceglie (Italiano) / Tranen(sis)–Barolen(sis)–Vigilien(sis) (Latin), having gained territories (and adopting their titles) from the suppressed Archdiocese of Barletta (above daughter) and Diocese of Bisceglie
- Gained in 1989 the (honorary) title of the see of Nazareth

The legend of St. Magnus relates that there was at Trani about the middle of the third century a bishop, Redemptus, who was succeeded by St. Magnus. The legend is recent in origin, and its character is so fantastic that it is not to be believed.

The first bishop whose date is known with certainty is Eutychius, who was present at the dedication of the Basilica of Monte Gargano in 493.

Until the end of the 10th century, Trani had followed the Latin Church and its liturgies, and Bishop Bernardo opposed the decree of the Patriarch Polyeuctes (968) introducing the Byzantine Rite; it is uncertain whether Joannes, bishop of Trani, who embraced the schism of Michael Caerularius and in consequence was deposed by Pope Nicholas II (1059), belonged to the Greek Rite. His successor was Delius, and thenceforward Trani continued in the Latin Church.

In 1073 Trani fell into the hands of the Normans, and Count Pierre d'Hauteville became Count of Trani, though he was quickly put down by Robert Guiscard.

In 1098 Nicholas the Pilgrim, a Byzantine Christian, died there; under another Byzantine the new cathedral was dedicated to that saint. Bertrand II (1157–87) tried to arrange a Byzantine–Sicilian marriage alliance. Samarus was granted the lordship of the Jews of Trani by Emperor Henry VI for his support against Tancred. Bartolommeo Brancacci (1328) distinguished himself on several embassies and was chancellor of the Kingdom of Naples.

In 1455 the Diocese of Cannae (Italian Canne) was united with that of Nazareth. Cannae was destroyed in 1083 by Robert Guiscard, with the exception of the cathedral and the episcopal residence. It had bishops in the sixth century, for Gregory the Great entrusted the see to the care of the bishop of Siponto; its bishops are again mentioned after the tenth century. In 1534 Cannae was separated from Nazareth and united to the diocese of Monteverde, but in 1552 the united dioceses were incorporated with Nazareth. In 1860 the See of Nazareth (Barletta) was united with Trani, the archbishop of which had been appointed in 1818 perpetual administrator of the see of Bisceglie.

With the See of Trani is united the ancient diocese of Salpe (Salapia of the Greeks), its known bishops comprising Palladius (465) and 23 successors before the definitive union in 1547. Another is the see of Carnia, which had bishops before the time Gregory, who entrusted it to the care of the Bishop of Reggio Calabria; in 649 it had a new ordinary, but later the city fell into decay.

== Bishops and Archbishops ==
=== Diocese of Trani ===
Erected: 5th Century

- Eutychius (attested 493, 502, 503)
- Suthinius (attested 761)

[Leo]

- Leopardus
- Oderisius (Auderis) (attested 834)
- Rhodostamos (attested 983)
- Chrysostomos (attested 999)

...
[Berardus (or Bernardus) (?)]
...

- Joannes (attested 1053, deposed 1059)
- Delius

=== Archdiocese of Trani ===
Elevated: 11th Century

- Bisantius (attested 1063)
- Bisantius

[Veterandus (1129)]

- Hubaldus (attested 1130 to 1138)
- Bisantius (attested 1150)
- Bertrandus (c.1157 – after September 1187)
- Samarus (Sanmarus) (attested 1192 – 1201/1202)
- G(regorius), O.S.B (1202)
- Bartholomaeus (1203 – 1225/1226)
- Jacobus, O.P. (1227 – 1263?)
- Nicolaus (1267 – 1276/1277)

- Opizo (1280–1287) (Administrator)

- Philippus (5 November 1288 – 1295/1297)
- Joannes de Anagnia, O.Min. (17 June 1297 – 1299)
- Oddo (6 November 1299 – 1317)
- Bartholomaeus (8 July 1317 – 1327)
- Bartholomaeus Brancaccio (23 December 1327 – 14 November 1341)
- Andreas (4 March 1342 – 1342)
- Guilelmus de Rosières, O.S.B. (4 April 1343 – 28 February 1344)
- Philippus, O.P. (26 March 1344 – 1348)
- Maugerius de Salerno, O.P. (5 November 1348 – 1352)
- Jacobus Tura Scottini (5 November 1352 – 1378)
- Matthaeus Spinae (26 January 1379 – ? ) (Avignon Obedience)
- Antonius de Lamberto (c. 1379 – 24 January 1383) (Roman Obedience)
- Enrico Minutoli (1383 – Sep 1389) (Roman Obedience)
- Giacomo Cubello (7 Nov 1393 – 1418 Died)
- Francesco Carosio (26 Jan 1418 – 27 Apr 1427 Died)
- Giacomo Barrili de Bianchis (16 Jun 1427 – 1438 Died)
- Latino Orsini (8 Jun 1439 – 23 Dec 1450)
- Giovanni Orsini (bishop) (1450 – 1478 Died)
- Cosma Orsini, O.S.B. (1 Apr 1478 – 21 Nov 1481 Died)
- Giovanni Attaldo (1481 – 1493 Died)
- Juan Castellar y de Borja (23 Aug 1493 – 9 Aug 1503)
- Cardinal Francisco Lloris y de Borja (9 Aug 1503 – 22 Jul 1506 Died)
- Cardinal Marco Vigerio della Rovere, O.F.M. Conv. (1506 – 18 Jul 1516 Died)
- Cardinal Giovanni Domenico de Cupis (30 Jul 1517 – 3 Jul 1551 Resigned)

Territory Added: 1547 from suppressed Diocese of Salpi

- Bartolommeo Serristori (3 July 1551 – 1555)
- Gianbernardino Scotti, C.R. (20 Dec 1555 – 9 Aug 1559)
- Juan Battista de Ojeda (26 Jan 1560 – 27 Aug 1571)
- Angelo Oraboni, O.F.M. Obs. (17 Mar 1572 – 1575 Died)
- Scipione de Tolfa (10 Dec 1576 – 20 Dec 1593)
- Giulio Caracciolo (31 Mar 1593 – 8 Jan 1597 Appointed Archbishop (Personal Title) of Cassano all’Jonio)
- Andrea de Franchis (4 Aug 1598 – 1603 Died)
- Juan de Rada, O.F.M. (17 Aug 1605 – 16 Jan 1606)
- Diego Alvarez (bishop), O.P. (19 Mar 1607 – Dec 1634 Died)
- Tommaso d'Ancora (Ariconi), C.R. (8 Jan 1635 Confirmed – 1656 Died)
- Tommaso de Sarria, O.P. (16 Oct 1656 Confirmed – 13 Apr 1665
- Giovanni Battista del Tinto, O. Carm. (15 Feb 1666 – 19 Oct 1676
- Pablo Jiménez Alejandro (Ximenes) (14 Mar 1678 – 21 Dec 1693 Died)
- Pietro de Torres (24 Jan 1695 Confirmed – Oct 1709 Died)
- Giuseppe Antonio Davanzati (22 Nov 1717 – 16 Feb 1755 Died)
- Domenico Andrea Cavalcanti, C.R. (12 May 1755 Confirmed – 3 Feb 1769 Died)
- Gaetano Maria Capece, C.R. (18 Dec 1769 – 27 Feb 1792)
- Luigi Trasmondi, O.S.B. (18 Jun 1792 – 1804 Died)
- Luigi Maria Pirelli, C.R. (29 Oct 1804 – 15 Jul 1820 Died)

=== Archdiocese of Trani – Bisceglie ===
United with Diocese of Bisceglie: 27 June 1818

- Gaetano Maria de Franci, C.R.M. (19 Apr 1822 Confirmed – 26 Jun 1847 Died)

=== Archdiocese of Trani – Nazareth – Bisceglie ===
Name Changed: 22 September 1828

- Giuseppe de’ Bianchi Dottula (22 Dec 1848 Confirmed – 22 Sep 1892 Died)

=== Archdiocese of Trani – Barletta – Nazareth – Bisceglie ===
Latin Name: Tranensis et Barolensis (et Nazarensis et Vigiliensis)
Name Changed: 21 April 1860

- Domenico Marinangeli (16 Jan 1893 – 5 Feb 1898)
- Tommaso de Stefano (Stefani) (24 Mar 1898 – 19 May 1906 Died)
- Francesco Paolo Carrano (1 Sep 1906 – 18 Mar 1915 Died)
- Giovanni Régine (6 Dec 1915 – 4 Oct 1918 Died)
- Giuseppe Maria Leo (17 Jan 1920 – 20 Jan 1939 Died)
- Francesco Petronelli (25 May 1939 – 16 Jun 1947 Died)
- Reginaldo Giuseppe Maria Addazi, O.P. (10 Nov 1947 – 3 Jul 1971 Resigned)
- Giuseppe Carata (28 Aug 1971 – 15 Dec 1990 Retired)

=== Archdiocese of Trani-Barletta-Bisceglie (-Nazareth) ===
Latin Name: Archidioecesis Tranensis-Barolensis-Vigiliensis (-Nazarensis)
Name Changed: 30 September 1986

- Carmelo Cassati, M.S.C. (15 Dec 1990 – 13 Nov 1999 Retired)
- Giovan Battista Pichierri (13 Nov 1999 – 26 July 2017)
- Leonardo D'Ascenzo (since 4 Nov 2017)

== Gallery of Co-cathedrals ==
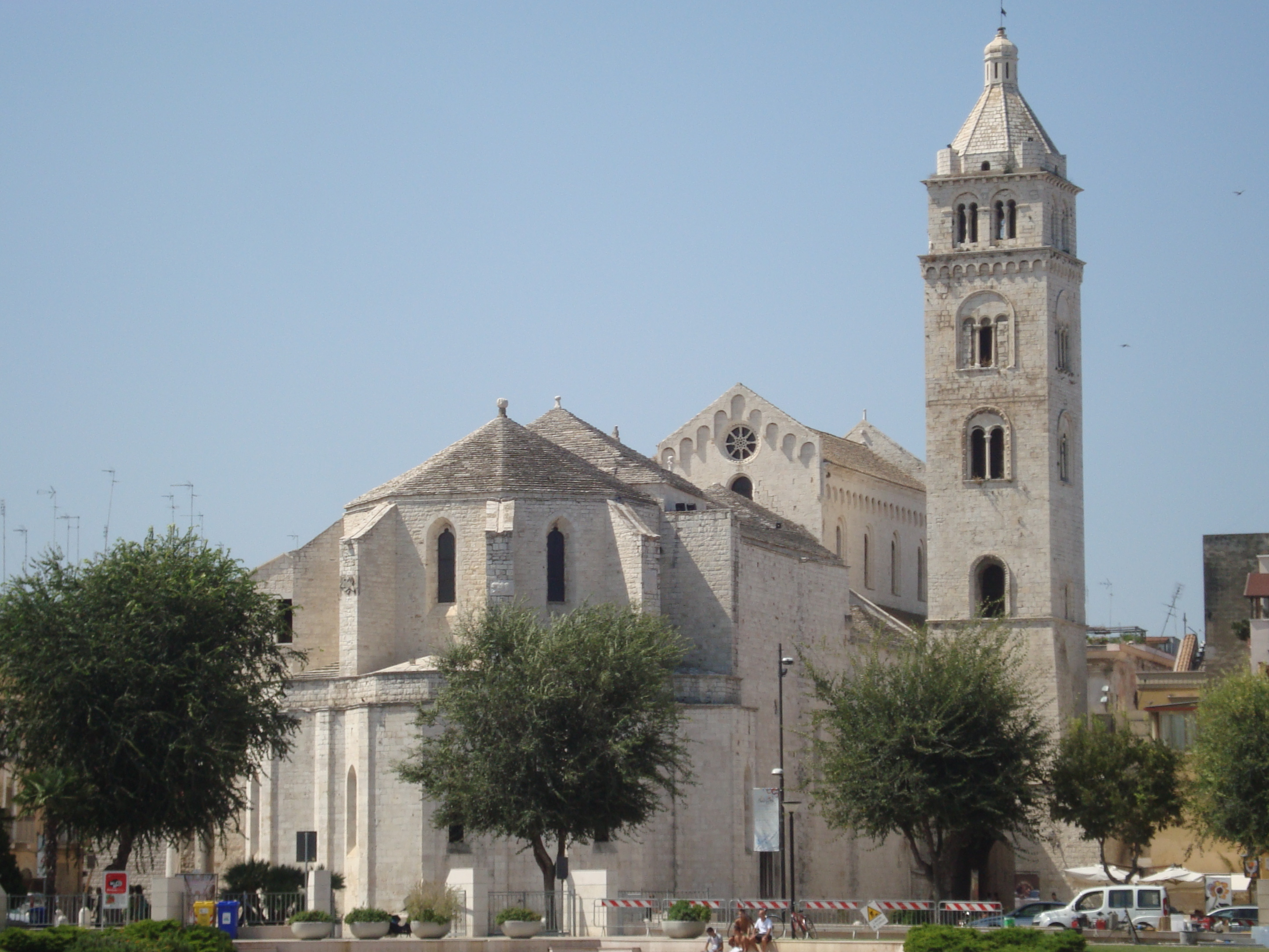
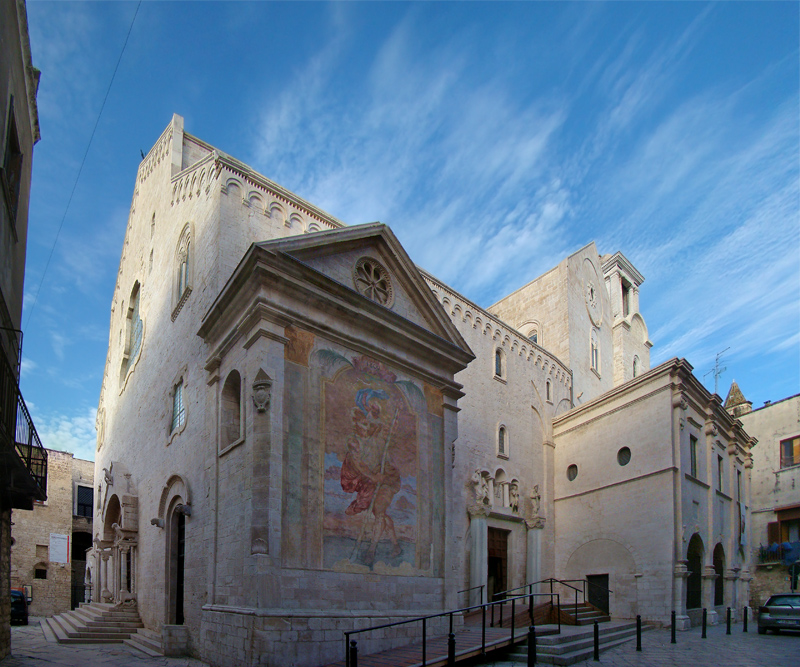
Co-cathedrals: Barletta Cathedral (left), Bisceglie Cathedral (right)

== See also ==
- List of Catholic dioceses in Italy
- Hierarchy of the Catholic Church
- Luisa Piccarreta
- Church of the Holy Family (Barletta)

== Sources and external links ==
=== Reference Works ===
- Eubel, Conradus, ed. (1913). Hierarchia catholica, Tomus 1 (second ed.). Münster: Libreria Regensbergiana. (in Latin)
- Eubel, Conradus, ed. (1914). Hierarchia catholica, Tomus 2 (second ed.). Münster: Libreria Regensbergiana. (in Latin)
- Eubel, Conradus, ed. (1923). Hierarchia catholica, Tomus 3 (second ed.). Münster: Libreria Regensbergiana.
- Gams, Pius Bonifatius (1873). Series episcoporum Ecclesiae catholicae: quotquot innotuerunt a beato Petro apostolo. Ratisbon: Typis et Sumptibus Georgii Josephi Manz. pp. 946–947. (Use with caution; obsolete)
- Gauchat, Patritius (Patrice) (1935). Hierarchia catholica IV (1592–1667). Münster: Libraria Regensbergiana. (in Latin)
- Ritzler, Remigius; Sefrin, Pirminus (1952). Hierarchia catholica medii et recentis aevi V (1667–1730). Patavii: Messagero di S. Antonio. (in Latin)
- Ritzler, Remigius; Sefrin, Pirminus (1958). Hierarchia catholica medii et recentis aevi VI (1730–1799). Patavii: Messagero di S. Antonio. (in Latin)
- Ritzler, Remigius; Sefrin, Pirminus (1968). Hierarchia Catholica medii et recentioris aevi sive summorum pontificum, S. R. E. cardinalium, ecclesiarum antistitum series... A pontificatu Pii PP. VII (1800) usque ad pontificatum Gregorii PP. XVI (1846) (in Latin). Vol. VII. Monasterii: Libr. Regensburgiana.
- Ritzler, Remigius; Pirminus Sefrin (1978). Hierarchia catholica Medii et recentioris aevi... A Pontificatu PII PP. IX (1846) usque ad Pontificatum Leonis PP. XIII (1903) (in Latin). Vol. VIII. Il Messaggero di S. Antonio.
- Pięta, Zenon (2002). Hierarchia catholica medii et recentioris aevi... A pontificatu Pii PP. X (1903) usque ad pontificatum Benedictii PP. XV (1922) (in Latin). Vol. IX. Padua: Messagero di San Antonio. ISBN 978-88-250-1000-8.

=== Studies ===
- Cappelletti, Giuseppe (1870). Le chiese d'Italia dalla loro origine sino ai nostri giorni (in Italian). Vol. vigesimoprimo (21). Venezia: Antonelli. pp. 47–56.
- D'Avino, Vincenzio (1848). Cenni storici sulle chiese arcivescovili, vescovili, e prelatizie (nullius) del regno delle due Sicilie (in Italian). Naples: dalle stampe di Ranucci. pp. 220–221.
- Di Biase, Pietro (2013). Vescovi, clero e popolo. Lineamenti di storia dell'Arcidiocesi di Trani-Barletta-Bisceglie. Rotas, Barletta. (in Italian)
- Kamp, Norbert (1975). Kirche und Monarchie im staufischen Königreich Sizilien: I. Prosopographische Grundlegung, Bistumer und Bistümer und Bischöfe des Konigreichs 1194–1266: 2. Apulien und Calabrien München: Wilhelm Fink 1975.
- Kehr, Paulus Fridolin (1962). Italia pontificia. Regesta pontificum Romanorum. Vol. IX: Samnia – Apulia – Lucania. Berlin: Weidmann. (in Latin), pp. 358–368.
- Lanzoni, Francesco (1927). Le diocesi d'Italia dalle origini al principio del secolo VII (an. 604) (in Italian). Rome: Biblioteca Apostolica Vaticana.
- Prologo, Gioacchino, ed. (1877). Le carte che si conservano nello Archivio del Capitolo metropolitano della città di Trani (dal 9. secolo fino all'anno 1266) (in Italian and Latin). Barletta: tip. ed. V. Vecchi e soci.
- Pagano, Archangelo (1883). I primi tempi della città di Trani (in Italian). Giovinazzo: Tip. del R. Ospizio Vittorio Emmanuele.
- Sarlo, Francesco (1897). Il Duomo di Trani: monumento nazionale storicamente ed artisticamente descritto, con note illustrative ed appendici (in Italian). Trani: V. Vecchi.
- Spaccucci, Felice and Curci, Giuseppe (2015). "Storia dell'arcidiocesi di Trani," Archivio Storico della Calabria – Nuova Serie – Numero 5 (in Italian). Cosenza: Luigi Pellegrini Editore. 2015. pp. 260 ff. ISBN 978-88-6822-130-0.
- Spaccucci, Felice and Curci, Giuseppe (1991). Cronotassi degli arcivescovi di Trani, in: F. Spaccucci and G. Curci, Storia dell'arcidiocesi di Trani, Napoli 1991, pp. 127–152.
- Ughelli, Ferdinando; Coleti, Niccolò (1721). Italia sacra, sive De Episcopis Italiae (in Latin). Vol. Tomus septimus (VII). Venice: apud Sebastianum Coleti. pp. 885–917.

=== External links ===
- GCatholic, with Google map – data for all sections

==== Acknowledgment ====
- Benigni, Umberto. "Trani and Barletta." The Catholic Encyclopedia. Vol. 15. New York: Robert Appleton Company, 1912, retrieved: 2017-03-15.
