= Church of St Audoin =

Church building in Bisceglie, Italy

- Chiesa di Sant'Adoeno
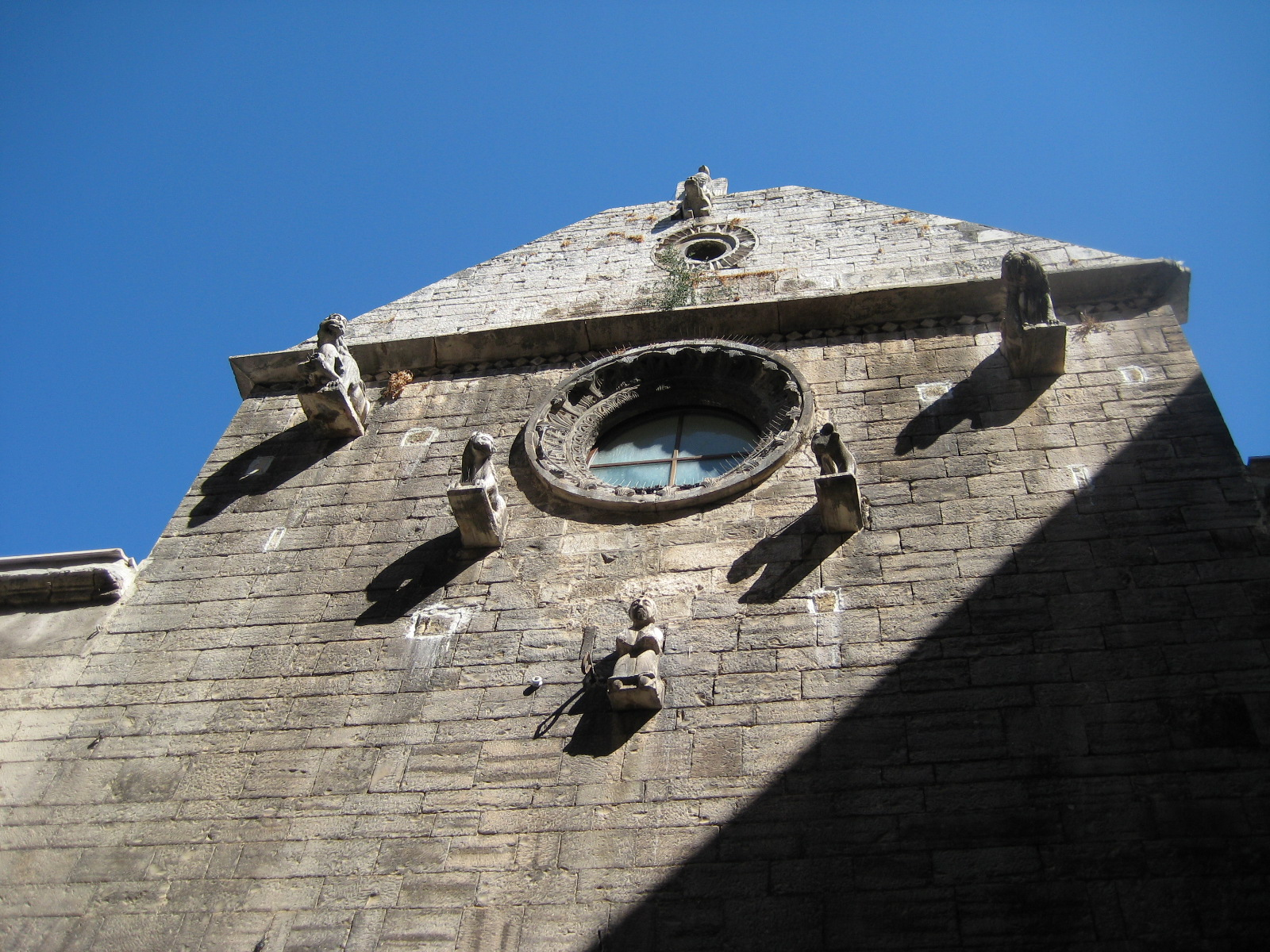
- Facade of the Church of St Audoin

Religion
- Affiliation: Catholicism
- Region: Apulia
- Rite: Roman

Location
- Location: Bisceglie
- Country: Italy
- Interactive map of Church of St Audoin

Architecture
- Style: Romanesque
- Completed: 11th century

The Church of St Audoin (Italian: Chiesa di Sant'Adoeno) is an 11th-century church in Bisceglie, Apulia, in Italy. The church is named for the Frankish bishop and saint Audoin.

The church was built in 1074, and dedicated to the Virgin Mary, to John the Apostle, and to Audoin. Reportedly, the church was built by Normans—hence the dedication to Audoin, a bishop from Rouen.
