= Mauro Cozzoli =

Italian priest (born 1946)

The Reverend Monsignor Mauro Cozzoli
- Chaplain of His Holiness
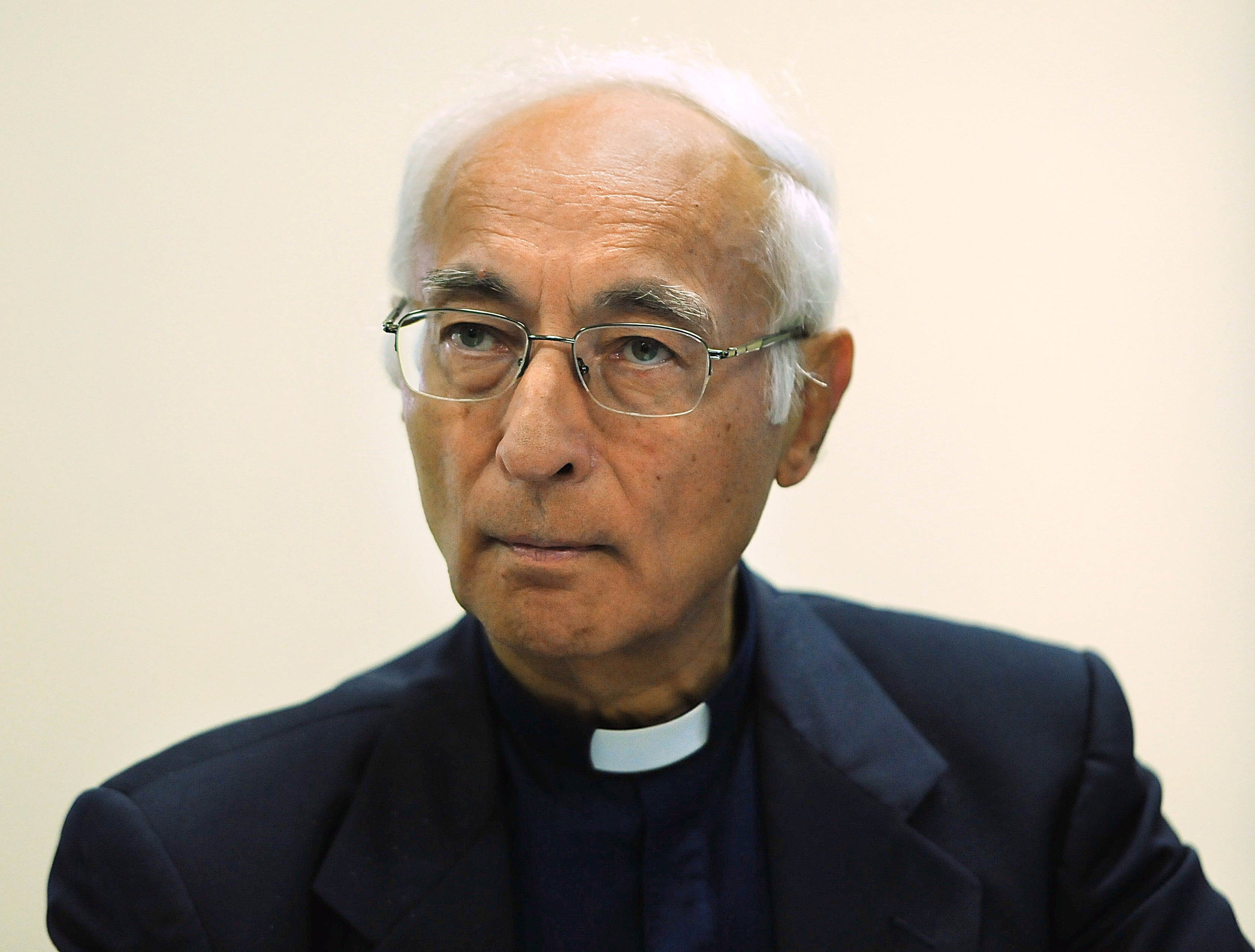
- Appointed: 17 March 1986
- Predecessor: none, new post

Orders
- Ordination: 14 May 1970 by Pope Paul VI

Personal details
- Born: 3 April 1946 (age 80) Bisceglie, Apulia, Italy
- Denomination: Roman Catholic
- Residence: Rome
- Education: Pontifical Roman Major Seminary

Mauro Cozzoli (born 3 April 1946 in Bisceglie, Apulia, Italy) is an Italian Roman Catholic priest, theologian and writer, chaplain of His Holiness from 17 March 1986.

He is a professor at the Pontifical Lateran University. As of 2007 he teaches moral theology there.

== Biography ==
Cozzoli has completed the training for the priesthood at the Pontifical Roman Major Seminary, studying philosophy and theology at the Pontifical Lateran University. He was ordained a priest for the Archdiocese of Trani-Barletta-Bisceglie by Pope Paul VI on 17 May 1970 in St. Peter's Square.

He served in Rome as assistant parish, in the parish of the Sacred Hearts also completing his studies with a doctorate in moral theology at the Pontifical Alphonsian Academy, Institute of Moral Theology at the Pontifical Lateran University, with a thesis entitled: L'uomo in cammino verso... L'attesa e la speranza in Gabriel Marcel, fondamento di una concezione etica dell'esistenza umana (into English: The man on the way to ... The expectation and hope in Gabriel Marcel, the foundation of an ethical conception of human existence).

After teaching in Molfetta in the Pontifical Regional Seminary of Apulia "Pius XI", he has been working as a professor at the Pontifical Alphonsian Academy and the Pontifical Lateran University, where he is now Professor of Moral Theology.

He collaborates with some magazines of ethical issues.

Since 1999 he is also the spiritual father at the Roman Major Seminary.

He is consultant to the Pontifical Council for Pastoral Assistance to Health Care Workers (where, among other things, he was a member of the working group for drafting the document "Charter of the health care").

Lends its collaboration with the Congregation for the Doctrine of the Faith (consulting for the editio typical of the Catechism of the Catholic Church), the Pontifical Academy for Life (task force to study the "Identity and status of the human embryo" and for the study of the "culture of life: assumptions and dimensions" and work-group for the study of "brain death"), the Pontifical Council for Justice and Peace (preparation of the Compendium of the Social Doctrine of the Church).

Since 5 July 1999, with the appointment of the president, Cardinal Giacomo Biffi, he is a member of the Scientific Council of the Institute for Research and Education "Veritatis Splendor," in the Foundation Card. Giacomo Lercaro of Bologna.

Since July 2000, Deputy Assistant of the Italian National Catholic Doctors (national assistant: Cardinal Dionigi Tettamanzi).

Since October 2004 he is member of the Scientific Committee of the International "Card. Van Thuan" on the Social Doctrine of the Church.

Since January 2005 he is member of the Steering Committee and the editorial board of the theological journal "Lateranum".
