= Bisceglie =

Bisceglie Vescéggh (Neapolitan)
- Comune
- Comune di Bisceglie
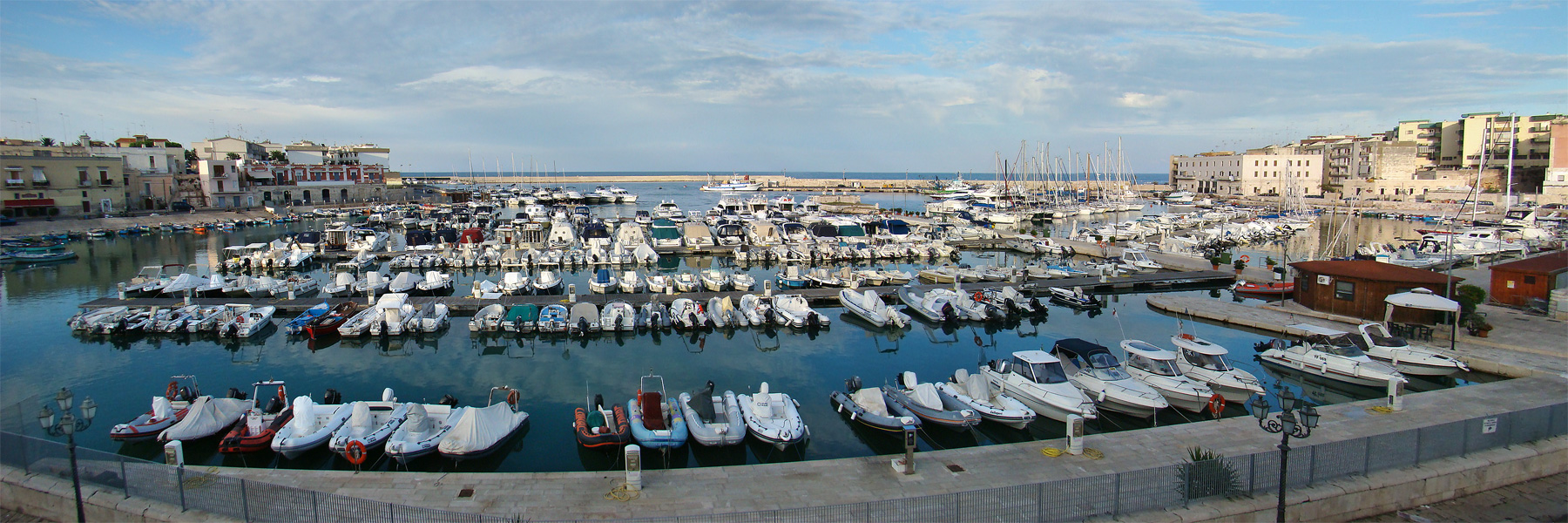
- The harbour

- Location within Italy Location within Apulia
- Coordinates: 41°14′35″N 16°30′19″E
- Country: Italy
- Region: Apulia
- Province: Barletta-Andria-Trani (BT)

Government
  - Mayor: Angelantonio Angarano

Area
  - Total: 69.25 km^{2} (26.74 sq mi)
- Elevation: 16 m (52 ft)

Population (31 December 2017)
  - Total: 55,385
  - Density: 799.8/km^{2} (2,071/sq mi)
- Demonym: Biscegliesi
- Time zone: UTC+1 (CET)
  - Summer (DST): UTC+2 (CEST)
- Postal code: 76011
- Dialing code: 080
- Patron saint: Sts. Maurus, Sergius and Pantaleon
- Saint day: First Monday in August
- Website: Official website

Bisceglie (Italian: [biʃˈʃeʎʎe]; Biscegliese: Vescégghie) is a city and municipality of 55,251 inhabitants in the province of Barletta-Andria-Trani, in the Apulia region (Italian: Puglia), in southern Italy. The municipality has the fourth highest population in the province and fourteenth highest in the region.

The area has been inhabited since prehistoric times, with at least two caves showing evidence of occupation during the Neolithic. Its name probably derives from the Latin "vigilae", "watchtowers", suggesting the importance of its location on the Adriatic Sea during the time of the Roman Empire. The modern city finds its roots in the settlement by Italo-Normans in the eleventh century. Today, it is an important agricultural hub, with manufacturers mainly in the textile industry, and it is a tourist destination. It was awarded Blue Flag Beach certification in 2001 for high environmental and quality standards. Scallette and Salsello Beaches were also certified in 2003, 2005 and 2006.

== Physical geography ==
The city stretches along roughly 7.5 kilometres of the Adriatic seashore between the municipalities of Trani to the north and Molfetta to the south. The mainly flat land gradually slopes toward the sea along the shoreline, which is scored with shallow valleys with microclimates favourable to the flourishing of flora and fauna. The city extends inland toward the municipalities of Corato, Ruvo di Puglia, and Terlizzi, where it reaches the foothills of the Murge Plateau.

In height, Bisceglie ranges from sea level to 16 metres above it and mainly occupies a strip between the shore and the Bologna-Lecce railway line, with some foothills going beyond the railway line in the Sant'Andrea neighbourhood, the employment and industrial areas. The oldest part of the city, once bounded by two valleys that converge near the basin of the port, sits higher than the later surrounding urban development.

=== Climate ===
The city has a Mediterranean climate, with continental humid winters and hot, humid summers. Temperature fluctuations are moderated by the Adriatic Sea. Being a coastal city, relative humidity remains high throughout the year and ranges on average between 70% and 90%. Cold air currents from the northeast often bring lower temperatures in winter and sporadic amounts of snowfall. Rain, mainly confined to the winter months, is extremely variable.

== Name ==
One theory holds that the town's name derives from its Latin name, Vigiliae ("vigil"), the name given to the town because of a series of watchtowers along the coast. According to Mario Cosmai, author of a number of local histories of the town, "Pompeo Sarnelli theorized that Bisceglie was founded by the Romans at the time of the Pyrrhic war. In the service of Rome, the countryside would have carried out the task of supervising the sea through checkpoints, from whence the name Vigiliae, and subsequently Bisceglie."

The name may also predate the Romans and be of Messapic origin. Ceglie or Caelia is the name for "settlement" in Messapic language. Similar towns in Apulia are named using Ceglie, such as Ceglie Messapica and Ceglie del Campo south of Bari. There is also a small Slovenian town, Čelje, deriving from Illyrian, which has similar language roots.

== History ==
=== Prehistoric period ===
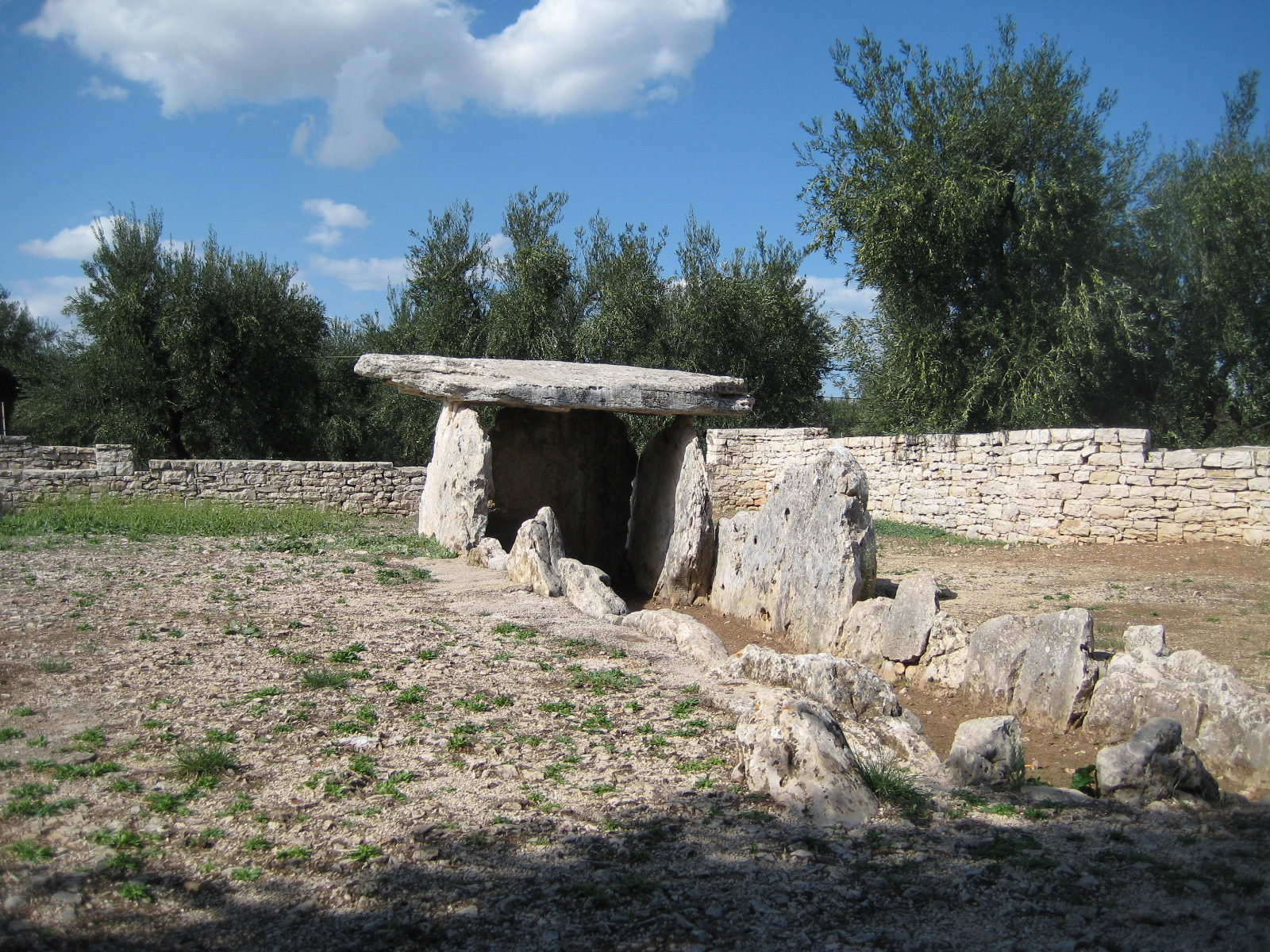
The Bronze-Age Chianca dolmen built on Bisceglie terrain

The territory of Bisceglie has been inhabited since prehistoric times.

In the Paleolithic period, Neanderthal people inhabited caves in the area, the Grotta di Santa Croce near Bisceglie and the Grotta del Cavallo near Nardò. Evidence of human activity is found in numerous flaked stone weapons and tools, remains of animals of extinct species such as prehistoric lions, bears, oxen and horses, remains of animals of remote species like rhinoceros, hyena, and deer, and the curved human femur typical of Neanderthal man found in the grotto of Santa Croce that is currently preserved in the National Archaeological Museum of Taranto.

In the Zembro cave, ceramic remains from the Neolithic period have also been found.

In the Bronze Age, impressive grave-altars called dolmens were built in the area. The Chianca dolmen (from the local dialect word 'chienghe', or stone slab) has a 10-meter long passage leading to a burial cell of 2 × 1.6 meters. Italian physiologist and antiquarian Angelo Posso claimed to be the first scientist to describe it, having been directed to it by a local farmer in August 1901. He called it "the largest and best preserved" of all Italians dolmens. The nearby Albarosa dolmen is described as in poor condition.

=== Greco-Roman period ===
When the central part of Puglia was supposedly occupied by the Peucetians, a theory not supported by sufficient archaeological evidence, the area of the prehistoric sunken Karst basin that forms a wide natural amphitheater in Molfetta, and the district of Navarino in the territory of Bisceglie, were home to Greek settlers who had left their native lands of Pylos and Nabàrinon in Greece. Local place names supposedly derive from those settlers. In the third century, following the Pyrrhic War, the territory fell under the dominion of Rome, and even though furrowed by new roads, it continued to be a transit zone and a place of scant importance. A Roman-era milestone can be found in the garden at Piazza Vittorio Emanuele II near Route SS16. During this time, there would have been a settlement here called Vigiliae ("Vigil").

=== Middle Ages ===
At the fall of the Western Roman Empire, the territory of Bisceglie was characterized by the presence of small clumps of houses surrounded by high walls that were often adjacent to religious temples. The Giano (Janus) farmhouse dating back to the Roman age, and the hamlets of Cirignano, Pacciano, Sagina, and Zappino are all known for this type of house.

From the early years of the seventh century up to 800 the territory of Bisceglie remained under the governance of the Lombard gastald of Canosa.

Around 700 the Janus farmhouse, an ancient place of pagan worship, became the seat of a rich monastery, while in 789 some houses of the Pacciano hamlet were sold to the famous monastery of Santa Sofia. There was a spot there along the coast, rough and dense with vegetation, that was a good shelter for boats that was called by the inhabitants Vescègghie, from the name of the wild oaks spread all around. That spot was a natural outlet to the sea for those peasants who slowly started a modest seafaring collective. From that arose a small fishing village called Vescègghie, in the same timeframe as the establishment of other villages of Lombard origin such as Giovinazzo on the Adriatic coast and Terlizzi, inland. From 800 the territory was subject to the Longobard Gastald of Trani, in that period a flourishing Adriatic city. Subsequently, for about thirty years, the land of Bari was held by the Saracens, then passed to the Lombards and the Byzantines.

==== Norman occupation ====
The modern history of the city starts in the 11th century. Around the year 1000 the Normans landed on the Adriatic coast. In 1042 Robert Guiscard assigned Trani and its surroundings to his vassal Peter I of Trani, who took Bisceglie and Barletta. He, following some homeowners' requests for protection, started fortifying an area of homes that had cropped up near the sea. In 1060 the most ancient core of the city, surrounded by walls, was equipped with an imposing watchtower.

In this period the worship of Saints Maurus, Sergius and Pantalemon was introduced, and they became the new patron saints of Bisceglie. In 1063 the bishopric of Bisceglie was established by Pope Alexander II and the construction of the cathedral was started.

In 1071 Robert Guiscard reassigned Bisceglie to Peter II, Count of Trani.

In 1167 Bishop Amando ordered the transportation of the sacred relics, kept until then in a sepulcher in the hamlet of Sagina, to within the city walls where the cathedral building had been completed. Among the varied activities of the nascent urban settlement, seafaring activity was key for profitable trade with the Dalmatian and Albanian coast, as well as with the Aegean Islands and the island of Cyprus.

Subsequently, Frederick II, Holy Roman Emperor ordered the construction of a castle adjoining the main tower.

Furthermore, the Hohenstaufen built up the entire territory with watchtowers. Some surviving examples can be found in the Gavetino tower, the tower of Sant'Antonio and the Zappino tower. Under the Capetian House of Anjou Bisceglie entered the fiefdom of the Counts of Montfort. In 1324 it passed to Amelio del Balzo and later, in 1326, to Robert of Anjou, son of King Charles II of Naples and his brother Philip. Despite the period of thriving commerce with the ports of the Adriatic and beyond, the young city was at the heart of intricate and bloody struggles that tore Puglia apart under Joanna I of Naples.

In 1360 James of Baux became Count of Bisceglie. In the period between 1381 and 1405 he was Count of Bisceglie Raimondo Del Balzo Orsini.

In September 1384 the pretender to the throne Louis I, Duke of Anjou, brother of King Charles V of France, and Charles III of Naples clashed with a long guerrilla war and on the night of 13 September Naples' forces breached the walls and sacked Bisceglie. On this occasion, Louis I, Duke of Anjou was wounded and died a few days later, on 20 September.

From 1405 to 1414, King Ladislaus I of Naples held the county, and entrusted it to Lorenzo Cotignola as a reward for meritorious military service. During this period, Queen Joanna I of Naples granted some privileges to Bisceglie, including the appointment to arm galleys in her arsenal.

== Ecclesiastical history ==
Around 800 AD, the Diocese of Bisceglie was established.

It was suppressed on 27 June 1818, its territory and title being merged into the Metropolitan Archdiocese of Trani-Bisceglie.

=== Veneration of the three patron saints ===
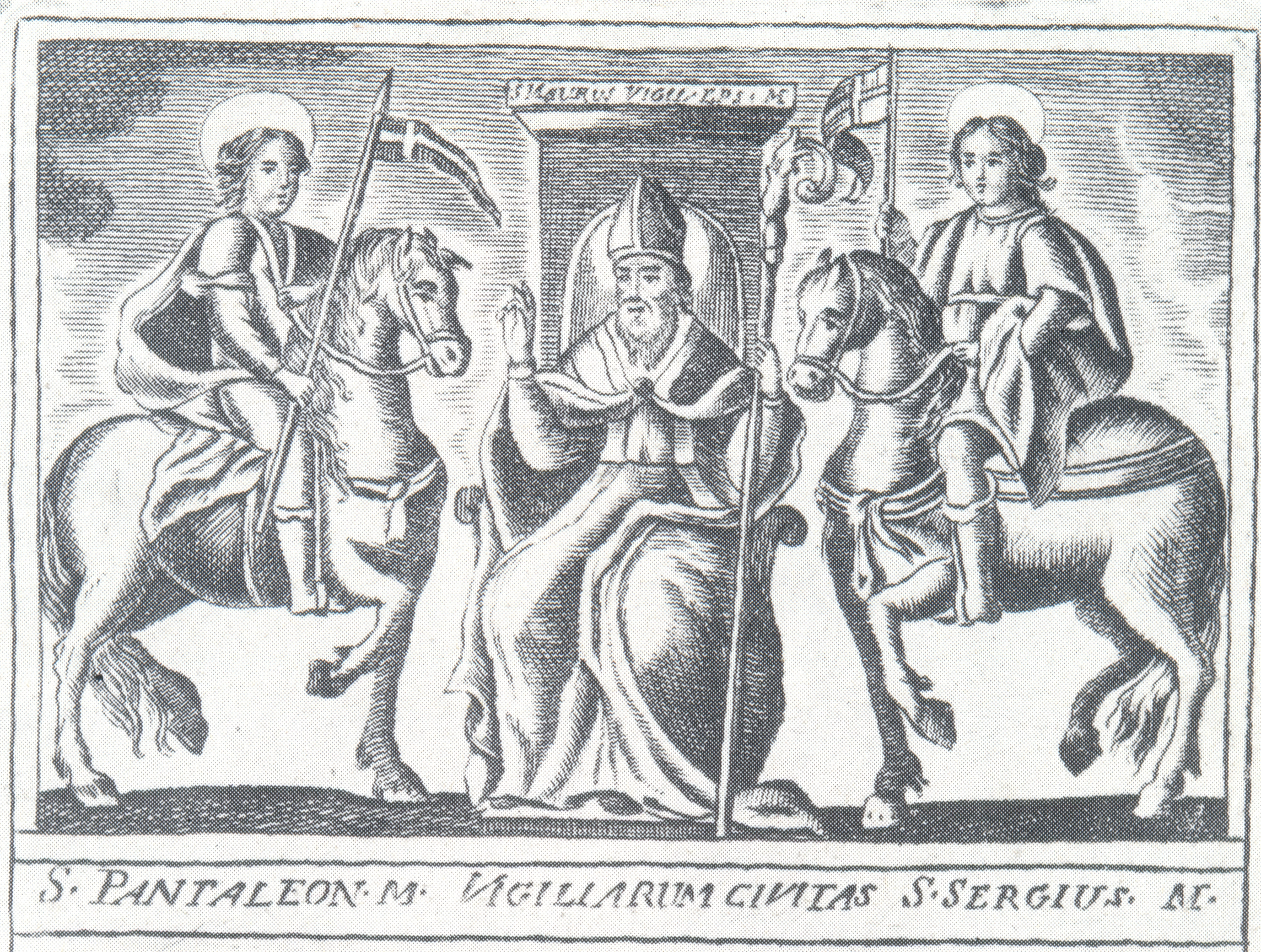
An icon of the three patron saints

According to the tradition reported by Armando, bishop of Bisceglie, in the time of Emperor Trajan two noble Roman knights, Sergius and Pantalemon, were won over by the words of Maurus of Bethlehem, a bishop preaching Christianity. Having converted to the new faith, the three were arrested and sentenced to death on 27 July 117. After their martyrdom, their remains were transported to the Bisceglie area in the Sagina district, where a Christian widow, Tecla de Fabiis, placed them in a tomb that she had had built. Slowly the worship of the three patron saints began to spread in the newly formed maritime village of Bisceglie. On 9 June 1167, under the bishop Amando, the sacred relics of the three martyrs were transported inside the walls of Bisceglie, and initially kept in the church of San Fortunato, near the castle. Later the bones were transported to the church of San Bartolomeo and, finally, on 30 July 1167 they were transported to the cathedral of Bisceglie. Here, they were placed in three stone urns under three altars, in a specially constructed crypt. This consecration was significant enough to be attended by local and regional ecclesiastical dignitaries, including the bishops of Cannae, Polignano a Mare, and Ruvo di Puglia (suffragans of Bari, the bishop of Vieste (suffragan of Siponto), and the archdeacon of Trani, besides other minor officials and many lay people. The inventio of the remains and the report on the translatio and the solemnities is found in the Acta Sanctorum, July vol.6, 352-374.

== Main sights ==
- Bisceglie Cathedral
- Church of St Audoin
- Chiesa di San Matteo (Bisceglie)
- Chiesa di Santa Margherita (Bisceglie), the church of Santa Margherita, in Romanesque-Apulian style (12th century), with fine canopied tombs of the Falcone family
- Palazzo Tupputi
- Teatro comunale Garibaldi
- Castello di Bisceglie
- Grotta di Santa Croce
- Dolmen della Chianca
- Dolmen di Albarosa
- Dolmen Frisari

== People ==
- Louis I, Duke of Anjou died there in 1384
- Cesare Fracanzano (1605–51) tenebrist painter
- Gaetano Veneziano (1665–1716) baroque composer
- Mauro Giuliani (1781–1829) guitar virtuoso and composer
- Leonardo de Mango (1843–1930) orientalist painter
- Mauro Cozzoli (1946), theologian and writer
- Erica Mou (1990) pop-singer and musician
- Nancy Dell'Olio (1961) lawyer

== Transport ==
Bisceglie railway station links it with cities such as Rome, Bologna, Ancona, Foggia, Bari, Lecce and Taranto.

== Neighbouring communes ==
Corato, Molfetta, Ruvo di Puglia, Terlizzi, Trani, Andria
