= Will of God =

Religious concept of God and creation

The will of God or divine will is a religious concept found in the Hebrew Bible, the New Testament, the Quran, and a number of other texts and worldviews, according to which God's will is the cause of everything that exists.

== Thomas Aquinas ==
According to Thomas Aquinas, God is the "Highest Good". The Summa Theologiae (question 6, article 3) affirms that "God alone is good essentially".

Because in Jesus there are two natures, the human and the divine one, Aquinas states that in him there are two distinct wills: the human will and the divine will.

== Balthasar Hubmaier ==
According to early Anabaptist theologian, Balthasar Hubmaier, God had two wills. One was called the "absolute" will and could never be changed, also called God's "hidden" will. The other, which could be accepted or rejected by people, was called the "ordained" will, also titled God's "Revealed" will.

The absolute will of God was paired with Predestination while the ordained will was connected to verses in the Bible which seemed to imply free will. In Hubmaier's concept both Determinism & Free Will existed; a form of Theological Compatibilism.

== Islamic discourse ==
God's command (amr) is the creative act of God and what has been intended for the creation. In Islamic discourse, Mu'tazilites and Ash'aris disagree on God's will (irāda) and God's command. According to the Mu'tazilites, God's commands are genuine expressions of God's will, while Ash'arites generally disagree. The latter also point at the story of Abraham as an example, that God's command (to sacrifice his son) was not his will. The Mu'tazilites, on the other hand, insist that God's command and will are equal, and that God can both will and command only good.

Islamic philosopher Ibn Arabi (1165–1240) was opposed to the idea of Free Will, instead believing that God's will was absolutely sovereign over all acts and that man's will didn't have any true existence.

== Asian worldviews ==
According to Mongolian belief, the laws of the universe are an expression of Gods will (jayayan). Sometimes, God may break its own usual laws and intervene by sending a chosen person to earth.

== See also ==
- Destiny
- Deus vult, a Latin expression meaning "God wills it", canonically expressed at the outset of the First Crusade.
- Divine law, any law that, according to religious belief, comes directly from the will of God, in contrast to man-made law.
- "God willing" is an English expression often used to indicate that the speaker hopes that their actions are those that are willed by God, or that it is in accordance with God's will that some desired event will come to pass, or that some negative event will not come to pass.
- Inshallah
- Karma
- Luisa Piccarreta
- Mashallah
- Plan of salvation, in general Christian concept.
  - Plan of salvation (Latter Day Saints) is the view of God's plan as described by the Latter Day Saint movement.
- Predestination
- Predestination in Islam
- Providentialism is the belief that all events on Earth are controlled by God.
- Will (philosophy)
