= Luisa Piccarreta =

Italian Catholic Servant of God

Servant of God Luisa Piccarreta TOSD
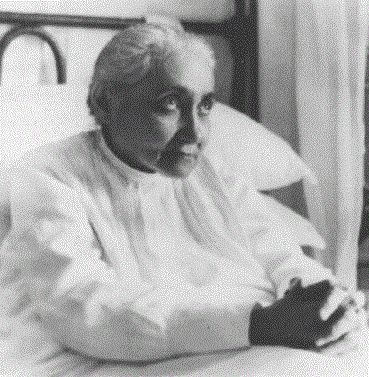

Personal life
- Born: 23 April 1865 Corato, Bari, Italy
- Died: 4 March 1947 (aged 81) Corato, Bari, Italy

Religious life
- Religion: Catholic
- Order: Third Order of Saint Dominic

Luisa Piccarreta (23 April 1865–4 March 1947) was a Catholic mystic and member of the Third Order of Saint Dominic. Her writings and spirituality, for a time condemned by the Catholic Church, centered on union with the will of God. A cause for beatification was opened in 1994 but experienced delays due to perceived issues in her writings, and the canonical process was suspended in 2024 during a doctrinal review of her writings.

== Biography ==
Luisa Piccarreta was born in the comune of Corato in the former Province of Bari, southern Italy, on 23 April 1865 to Vito Nicola and Rosa Tarantino Piccarreta. She received only a first grade education. From the age of sixteen she was bedridden. At the age of eighteen she joined the Third Order of Saint Dominic. Five years later, she stated she experienced a "mystical marriage" and felt a calling to "live in the Divine Will" and promote it. She stated that she received daily visions from Jesus. Piccarreta claimed that the unknown illness which assailed her was an "interior stigmata". Biographers have stated that she ate no food but the Eucharist for 60 years.

She began writing diaries of her experiences in 1891 at the request of her spiritual director. The Archbishop of Trani assigned a special confessor to her and set limits on her self-mortifications, including requiring her to eat at least once per day. Her writings included claims that the universe was 6,000 years old and that Jesus' thousand-year reign was imminent. Her writings also claimed that Jesus said those who followed the spirituality of the Divine Will would "surpass all the other saints." After writing around 10,000 pages across 36 notebooks, Piccarreta ceased writing in 1938 at the order of her confessor; her three first books (L'Orologio della Passione, Nel Regno dellà Divina Volontà and La Regina del Cielo nel regno della Divina Volontà) had been added to the Index Librorum Prohibitorum by the Holy Office. Piccarreta died of pneumonia on 4 March 1947, at the age of 81.

== Cause for beatification ==
After Piccarreta's death, her writings fell into obscurity. However, after the abolition of the Index Librorum Prohibitorum in 1966, there was a resurgence of interest in Piccarreta's writings in Italy. In 1994, the archbishop of Trani-Barletta-Bisceglie opened her cause for canonization. By October 2005, the diocesan process of inquiry and documentation within the Diocese of Trani-Barletta-Bisceglie-Nazareth was completed. Her case was then passed on to the Congregation for the Causes of Saints at the Holy See, and she was titled Servant of God. On several occasions, the Congregation for the Doctrine of the Faith refused to give its nihil obstat to the pursuit of the beatification process. The Cause of Beatification remained open and pending throughout the doctrinal review of Piccarreta's writings. However, the canonical process was temporarily suspended in January 2024 because of "theological, Christological, and anthropological" issues relating to her writings. Issues with her writings included suggesting that someone following the Divine Will loses their own human will entirely, and that the teachings revealed to Piccareta are new public revelations without which "redemption would remain incomplete".
