= Samarus =

Samarus (died 1201) was the Archbishop of Trani from 1192, when he succeeded Bertrand II, until his death. He was successful as a lawyer before becoming archbishop, and excelled at diplomacy after that.

Samarus was a member of a family of government officials from Trani. A document of 1104 was written by a certain Samarus iudex (judge), probably a relative of his. His relatives Nicholas and Samarus were justiciars at Trani and his father, Rainald, and another relative, Roger, were royal chamberlains. He himself originally served Bertrand as a notary (1160s?) before becoming archdeacon of the cathedral around 1174. Six documents drawn up by Samarus before his election as archbishop are known. In 1182 he argued before Pope Lucius III his cathedral's case against the clergy of Corato. In light of this and his subsequent success at political manoeuvring, it is probable that his election had more to do with his merits than his connexions.

In 1192 Samarus was still on good terms with King Tancred, who donated to him "the tithe of the royal revenues at Trani and Barletta", a donation confirmed that year by Pope Celestine III. Nevertheless, Samarus supported Queen Constance and the Emperor Henry VI in their claim on the Kingdom of Sicily. He was warmly praised by Henry in a diploma of April 1195, in which the emperor granted imperial protection to the church of Trani and confirmed all its rights and customs since the time of King William (probably William II). In reward for his service to Henry, Samarus also received the lordship of the Jewry of Trani. On a diplomatic mission to Cyprus in 1196 he negotiated commercial privileges for his town's merchants.
