= Giovan Battista Pichierri =

Italian prelate

- Archbishop of Trani-Barletta-Bisceglie
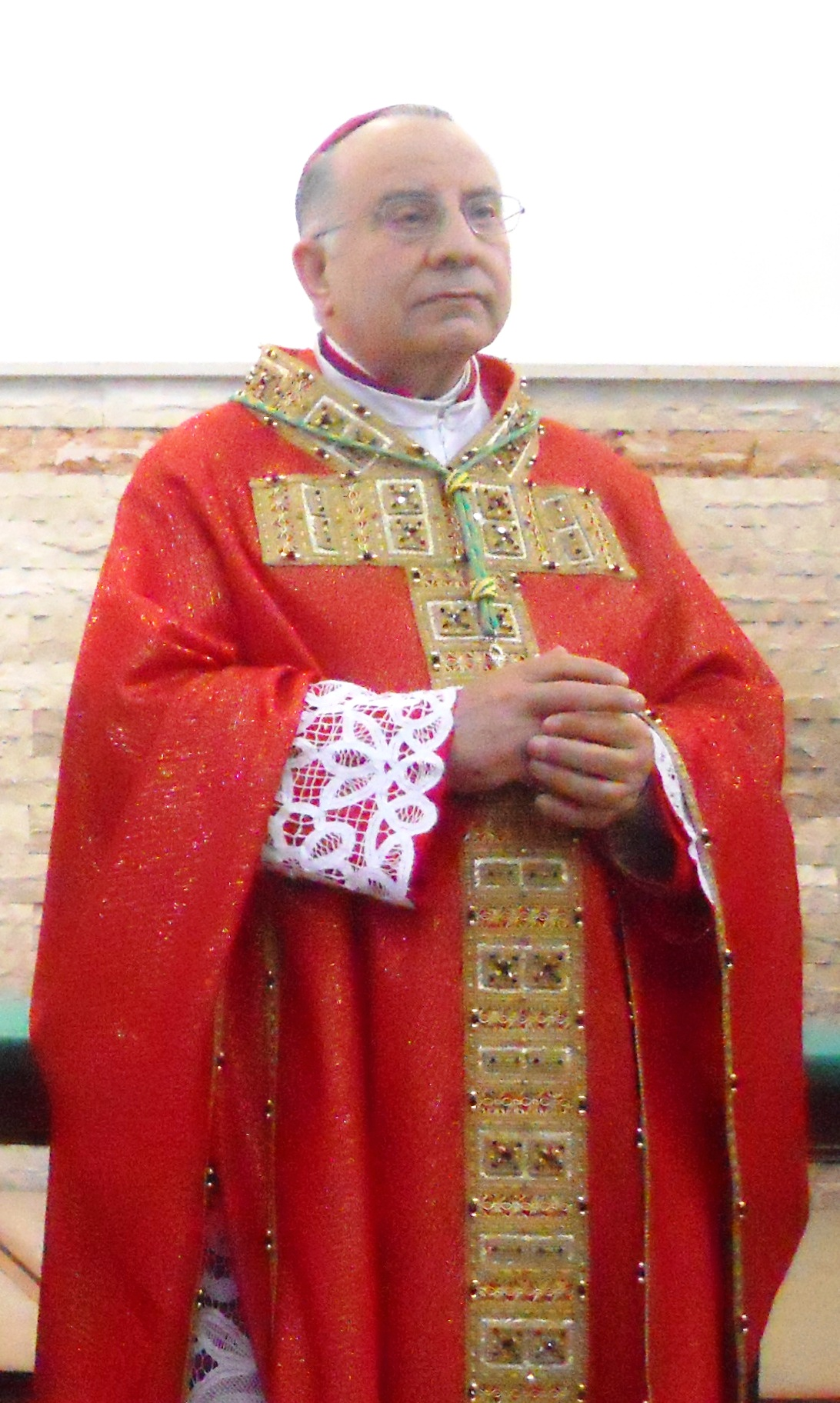
- Church: Catholic Church
- Archdiocese: Archdiocese of Trani-Barletta-Bisceglie
- In office: 13 November 1999 – 26 July 2017
- Predecessor: Carmelo Cassati
- Successor: Leonardo D'Ascenzo
- Previous post: Bishop of Cerignola-Ascoli Satriano (1990-1999)

Orders
- Ordination: 30 August 1967
- Consecration: 26 January 1991 by Armando Franco

Personal details
- Born: 12 February 1943 Sava, Province of the Ionian, Kingdom of Italy
- Died: 26 July 2017 (aged 74) Trani, Province of Barletta-Andria-Trani, Italy
- Coat of arms

Giovan Battista Pichierri (12 February 1943 – 26 July 2017) was an Italian prelate of the Roman Catholic Church.

Ordained to the priesthood in 1967, Pichierri served as bishop of the Diocese of Cerignola-Ascoli Satriano, Italy from 1990 to 1999. He then served as archbishop of the Archdiocese of Trani-Barletta-Bisceglie from 1999 until his death in 2017.
