= Bisceglie Cathedral =

Cathedral in Bisceglie, Apulia, Italy

Coordinates: 41°14′31.34″N 16°30′13.85″E

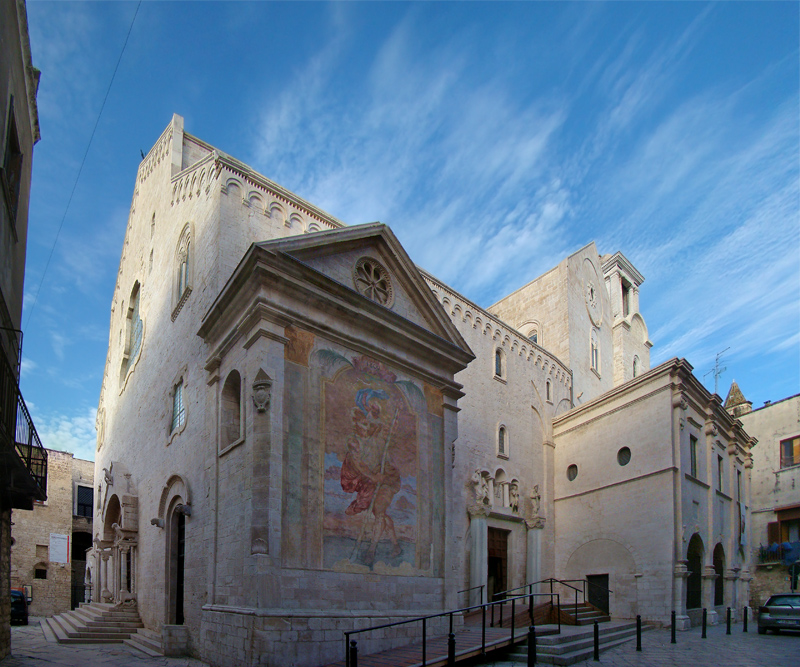
Bisceglie Cathedral

Bisceglie Cathedral (Italian: Duomo di Bisceglie; Concattedrale di San Pietro Apostolo) is a Roman Catholic cathedral in Bisceglie, Apulia, Italy. Peter II of Trani began to build the cathedral in 1073, which he dedicated to his namesake, Saint Peter. Building was completed in 1295. Formerly the episcopal seat of the Diocese of Bisceglie, it has been since 1986 a co-cathedral in the Archdiocese of Trani-Barletta-Bisceglie.
