= Maurus, Pantalemon and Sergius =

Christian martyrs

Saints Maurus, Pantalemon and Sergius
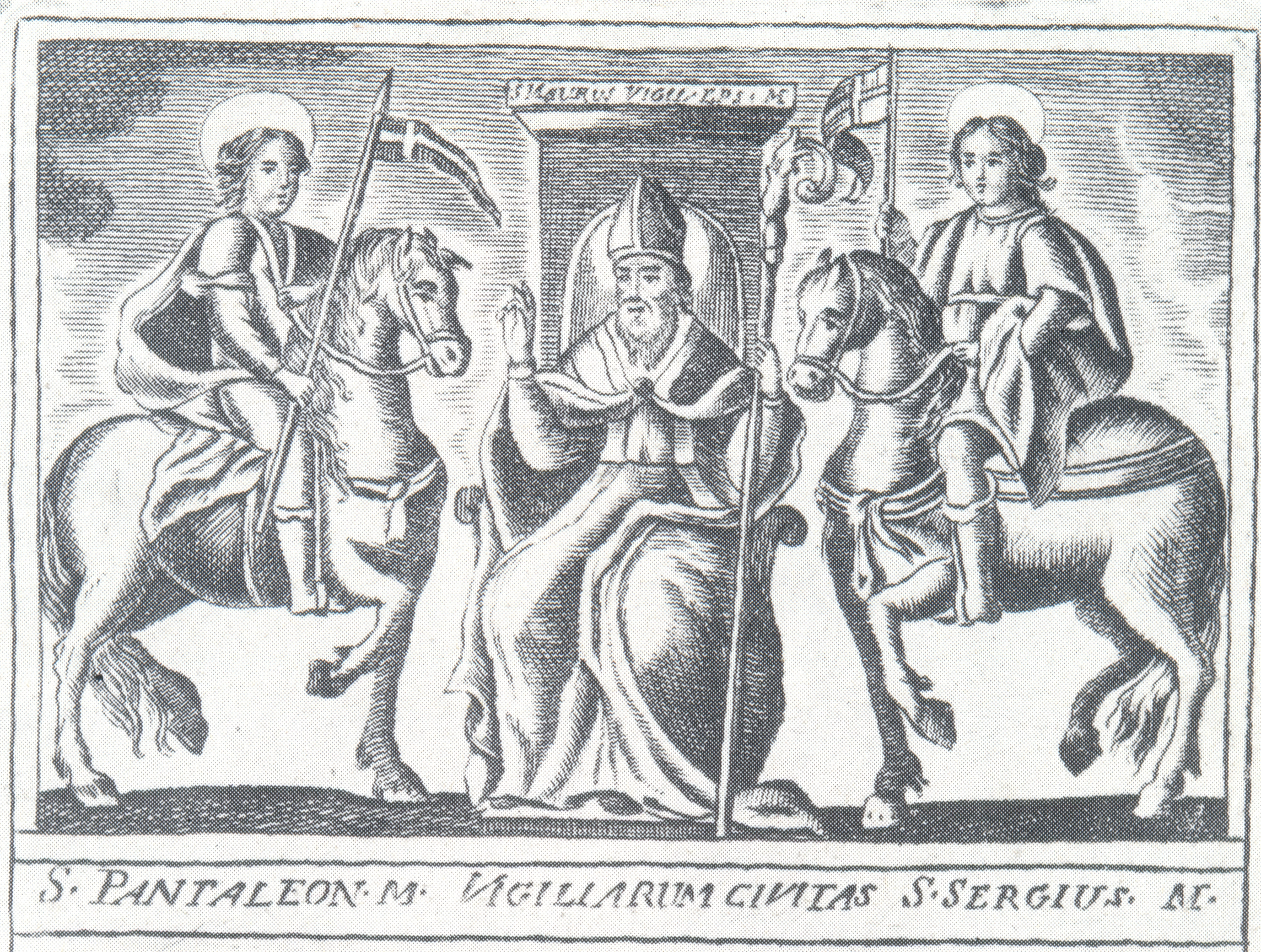
- St. Maurus, flanked either side by Sts. Sergius and Pantalemon on an Italian Prayer Card

Martyrs and Bishop of Bisceglie
- Born: Maurus - Bethlehem, Judea Pantalemon and Sergius - Apulia
- Died: 27 July 117; Bisceglie, Apulia
- Venerated in: Roman Catholic Church, Orthodox Church
- Canonized: Pre-congregation
- Major shrine: Cathedral of Bisceglie
- Feast: 27 July
- Attributes: Mauro is represented in robes of a bishop with a book. Sergio and Pantaleone, in military attire, on a horse, while raising a flag with red cross on a white background
- Patronage: Bisceglie, Apulia

Maurus, Pantelemon and Sergius (died 117 AD) are 2nd century Christian martyrs venerated at Bisceglie on the Adriatic. Tradition holds that Maurus was from Bethlehem and was sent to be the first bishop of Bisceglie by Peter. They were killed during the persecutions of Christians under the Roman emperor Trajan.
