= Cosma Orsini =

Italian Roman Catholic bishop and cardinal

Cosma Orsini (died 1481) (called Cardinal Orsini) was an Italian Roman Catholic bishop and cardinal.

== Biography ==
Cosma Orsini was born in Rome in the 1420s, the son of Gentile Migliorati of Fermo, and his wife Elena Orsini, who was the daughter of Carlo Orsini Lord of Pacentro, Lamentana, Fornello, Scrofano, Selci, Campagnano and Trevignano and Paola Gironima Orsini. His last name should have been Migliorati, but he used his mother's surname, Orsini. He was a grand-nephew of Pope Innocent VII (Migliorati). His mother was sister of Cardinal Latino Orsini and Archbishop Giovanni Orsini. Giovanni was a councilor of Ferdinando I King of Naples.

By 1474, he had obtained a doctorate in Canon Law, and was a Protonotary Apostolic and Canon of the Vatican Basilica.

Orsini was a member of the Order of Saint Benedict. He became Abbot nullius of the Benedictine Farfa Abbey on 8 August 1477, upon the resignation of Giovanni Orsini, his mother's brother.

On 1 April 1478, he was appointed Archbishop of Trani by Pope Sixtus IV, in succession to his uncle Giovanni — a post he occupied until his death. He retained the monastery of Farfa in commendam.

In the consistory of 15 May 1480, Pope Sixtus IV made him a cardinal priest. He received the titular church of S. Sisto, and, on 3 June 1480, he received the red hat in the Vatican Palace. On that same day, he opted for the titular church of Santi Nereo e Achilleo. Ludwig Pastor interprets the Consistory of 15 May 1480 as one that "further promoted the worldliness and pomp of the Sacred College.... With hardly an exception those raised to the purple were of high birth."

On Wednesday 12 September 1471, Pope Sixtus decided to take a vacation from the heat and persistent pestilences, and so travelled north some twenty miles to the lakeside town of Bracciano, which belonged to Virginio Orsini. Cardinal Cosma Orsini of Ss. Nereo ed Achilleo was with him, despite a severe case of the gout, to protect the family interests. On 1 October Sixtus decided to visit the alum mines at Tolfa, and then on 2 October he proceeded to Civitavecchia, where he wanted to see the fleet under the command of Cardinal Paolo Fregosi. After wandering around Tuscany, the Pope returned to Rome on 17 October. Cardinal Cosma remained at Bracciano.

Cardinal Cosmo died of "furiosa apoplexia" in Bracciano on 21 November 1481. On the next day his body was carried to the Abbey of Farfa, where he was buried.

== Bibliography ==
- Christine Shaw, The Political Role of the Orsini Family from Sixtus IV to Clement VII: Barons and Factions in the Papal States (Roma: Istituto Storico Italiano per il Medio Evo, 2007).
- Lorenzo Cardella, Memorie storiche de' Cardinali della Santa Romana Chiesa Tomo secondo (Roma: Pagliarini 1793).
