= Francesco Carosio =

1xth-century Roman Catholic bishop

Most Reverend Francesco Carosio
- Archbishop of Trani
- Church: Catholic Church
- Archdiocese: Archdiocese of Trani
- In office: 1418–1427
- Predecessor: Giacomo Cubello
- Successor: Giacomo Barrili
- Previous post: Bishop of Melfi (1412–1418)

Personal details
- Died: 27 April 1427

Francesco Carosio (died 1427) was a Roman Catholic prelate who served as Archbishop of Trani (1418–1427) and Bishop of Melfi (1412–1418).

== Biography ==
On 4 Jul 1412, Francesco Carosio was appointed during the papacy of Pope Gregory XII as Bishop of Melfi. On 26 Jan 1418, he was appointed during the papacy of Pope Martin V as Archbishop of Trani. He served as Archbishop of Trani until his death on 27 Apr 1427.

== External links and additional sources ==
- Cheney, David M. "Diocese of Melfi-Rapolla-Venosa". Catholic-Hierarchy.org. (for Chronology of Bishops) ^{[self-published]}
- Chow, Gabriel. "Diocese of Melfi-Rapolla-Venosa (Italy)". GCatholic.org. (for Chronology of Bishops) ^{[self-published]}
- Cheney, David M. "Archdiocese of Trani-Barletta-Bisceglie (-Nazareth)". Catholic-Hierarchy.org. (for Chronology of Bishops) ^{[self-published]}
- Chow, Gabriel. "Archdiocese of Trani-Barletta-Bisceglie (Italy)". GCatholic.org. (for Chronology of Bishops) ^{[self-published]}

Catholic Church titles
Preceded by Giovanni Dominici	Bishop of Melfi; 1412–1418	Succeeded by Giacomo Isolani
Preceded by Giacomo Cubello	Archbishop of Trani; 1418–1427	Succeeded by Giacomo Barrili
