= Grotta di Santa Croce =

Cave in Apulia, Italy

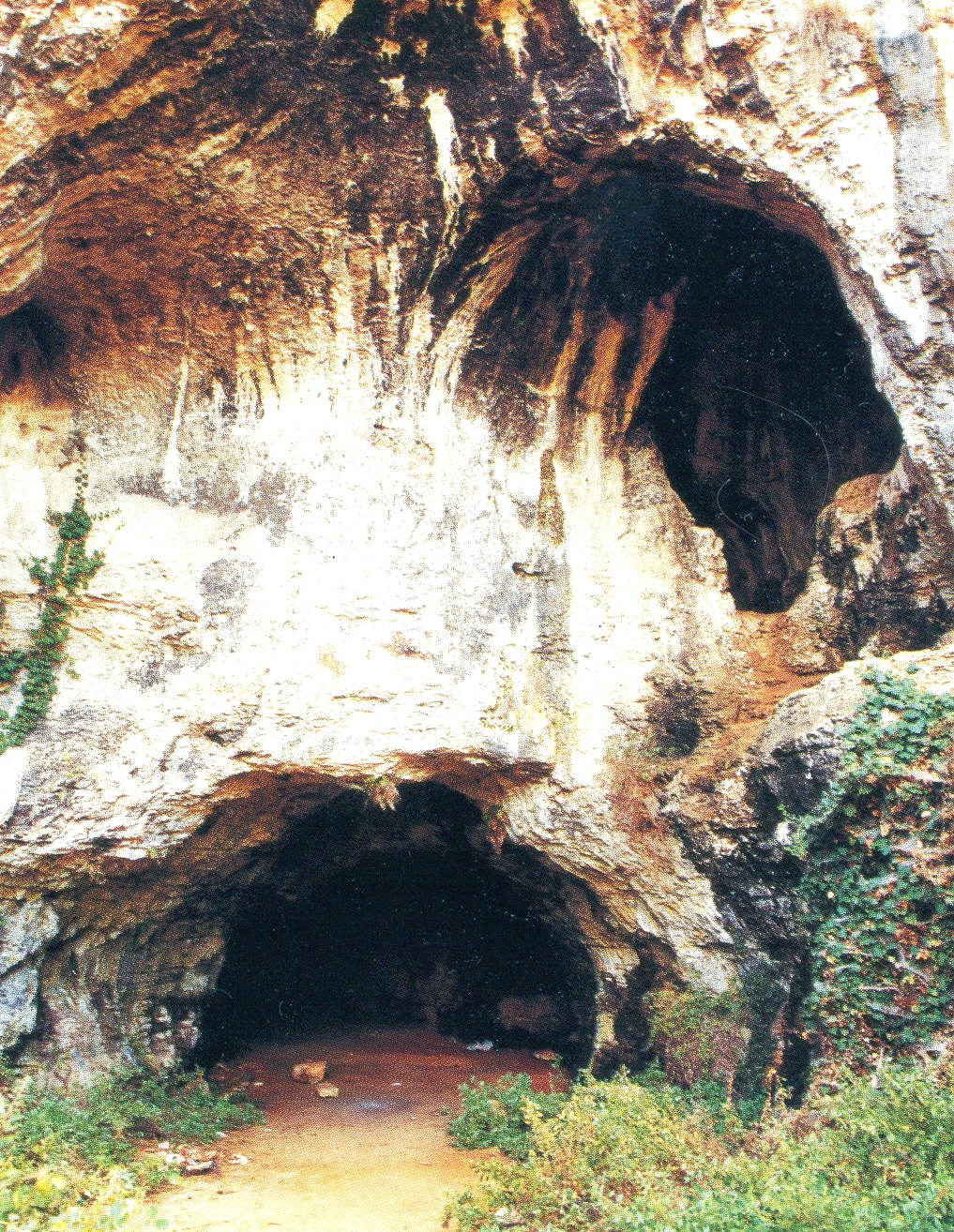

The Grotta di Santa Croce is a cave near Bisceglie, in the Apulia region of Italy.

The cave was inhabited during the Later Paleolithic era. It has a rock shelter and a long interior corridor. Red starburst marks are visible 14 meters away from the entrance. A woven basked contained grains of barley and may indicate an offering, and earthenware vessels may have been used to collect water dripping from the ceiling.
