= Barisano da Trani =

Italian sculptor

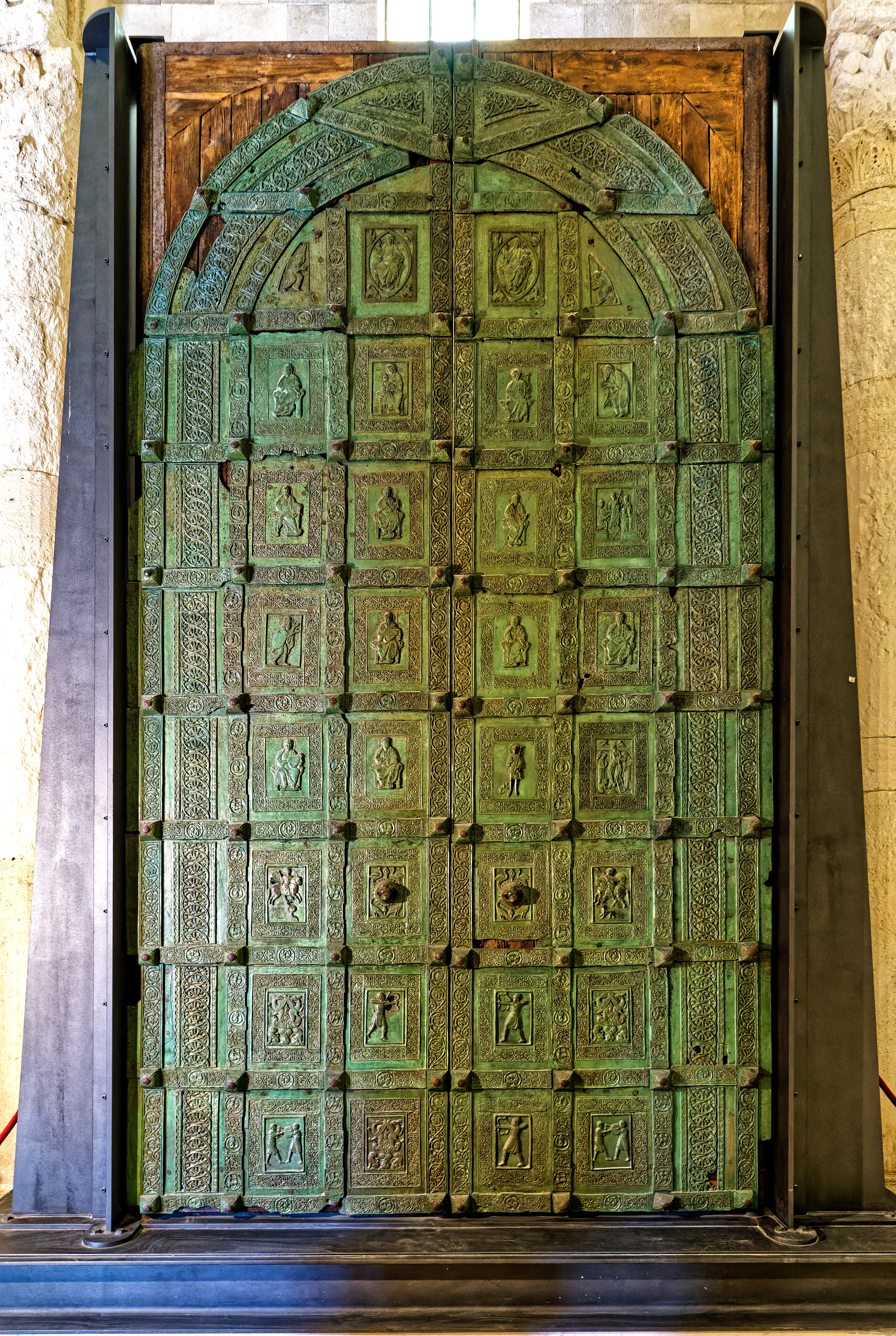
Bronzeportal in der Kathedrale von Trani.

Barisano da Trani was an Italian sculptor of the 12th century. He is best known for his bronze relief door panels on the doors of churches such as Trani Cathedral (1185) and Monreale Cathedral in Monreale (1179). Barisano da Trani also made relief door panels for churches in Astrano and in Ravello on the Amalfi Coast.

Barisano preferred panels on doors which included religious figures, often making them decorative and symbolic. His carving showed similarities with Nordic sculpture and in some works recalls the Sassanid art of the Middle East.
