= Leonardo D'Ascenzo =

Italian Roman Catholic prelate

- Archbishop of Trani-Barletta-Bisceglie
- Church: Catholic Church
- Archdiocese: Archdiocese of Trani-Barletta-Bisceglie
- Appointed: 4 November 2017
- Predecessor: Giovan Battista Pichierri

Orders
- Ordination: 5 July 1986 by Martino Gomiero
- Consecration: 14 January 2018 by Vincenzo Apicella

Personal details
- Born: 31 August 1961 (age 64) Valmontone, Province of Rome, Italy

Leonardo D'Ascenzo (born 31 August 1961) is an Italian Roman Catholic prelate.

He was born on 31 August 1961, and ordained to the priesthood in 1986, and began serving the Suburbicarian Diocese of Velletri-Segni. D'Ascenzo was appointed archbishop of Trani-Barletta-Bisceglie on 4 November 2017, following the death of Giovan Battista Pichierri. D'Ascenzo was ordained a bishop on 14 January 2018, and formally installed on 27 January 2018.
