= Bisceglie railway station =

Railway station in Bisceglie, Italy

Bisceglie

General information
- Location: Bisceglie; Bisceglie, Barletta-Andria-Trani, Apulia; Italy
- Coordinates: 41°14′07″N 16°29′58″E
- Operator: Rete Ferroviaria Italiana
- Line: Ancona–Lecce (Trenitalia)
- Platforms: 2
- Train operators: Trenitalia

Other information
- Classification: Silver

History
- Opened: 1865; 161 years ago
Location
- Location within Apulia Location within Italy

Bisceglie (Italian: Stazione di Bisceglie) is a railway station in the Italian town of Bisceglie, in the Province of Barletta-Andria-Trani, Apulia. The station lies on the Adriatic Railway (Ancona–Lecce). The train services are operated by Trenitalia.

== Train services ==
The station is served by the following service(s):

- Intercity services Rome - Foggia - Bari
- Intercity services Bologna - Rimini - Ancona - Pescara - Foggia - Bari - Brindisi - Lecce
- Intercity services Bologna - Rimini - Ancona - Pescara - Foggia - Bari - Taranto
- Night train (Intercity Notte) Rome - Foggia - Bari - Brindisi - Lecce
- Night train (Intercity Notte) Milan - Parma - Bolgona - Ancona - Pescara - Foggia - Bari - Brindisi - Lecce
- Night train (Intercity Notte) Milan - Ancona - Pescara - Foggia - Bari - Taranto - Brindisi - Lecce
- Night train (Intercity Notte) Turin - Alessandria - Bolgona - Ancona - Pescara - Foggia - Bari - Brindisi - Lecce
- Regional services (Treno regionale) Foggia - Barletta - Bari

== See also ==
- Railway stations in Italy
- List of railway stations in Apulia
- Rail transport in Italy
- History of rail transport in Italy
