= Giovanni D'Ascenzi =

Italian bishop

- Bishop of Diocese of Arezzo-Cortona-Sansepolcro
- Church: Roman Catholic Church
- See: Diocese of Arezzo-Cortona-Sansepolcro
- In office: 1983 - 1996
- Predecessor: Telesforo Giovanni Cioli
- Successor: Flavio Roberto Carraro
- Previous post(s): Bishop

Orders
- Ordination: 19 June 1943

Personal details
- Born: 6 January 1920; Valentano, Italy
- Died: 26 February 2013 (aged 93)

Giovanni D'Ascenzi (6 January 1920 – 26 February 2013) was an Italian bishop of the Roman Catholic Church.

D'Ascenzi was born in Valentano, Italy and was ordained a priest on 19 June 1943. He was appointed Bishop of the Diocese of Pitigliano-Sovana-Orbetello on 7 October 1975 and ordained on 7 December 1975. On 11 April 1983 he was appointed bishop of Historic dioceses of Arezzo, Cortona, and Sansepolcro, which were united on 30 September 1986 to form the Diocese of Arezzo-Cortona-Sansepolcro. He retired from that position 8 June 1996.
