= Nicholas the Pilgrim =

Bizantine saint

Saint Nicholas the Pilgrim
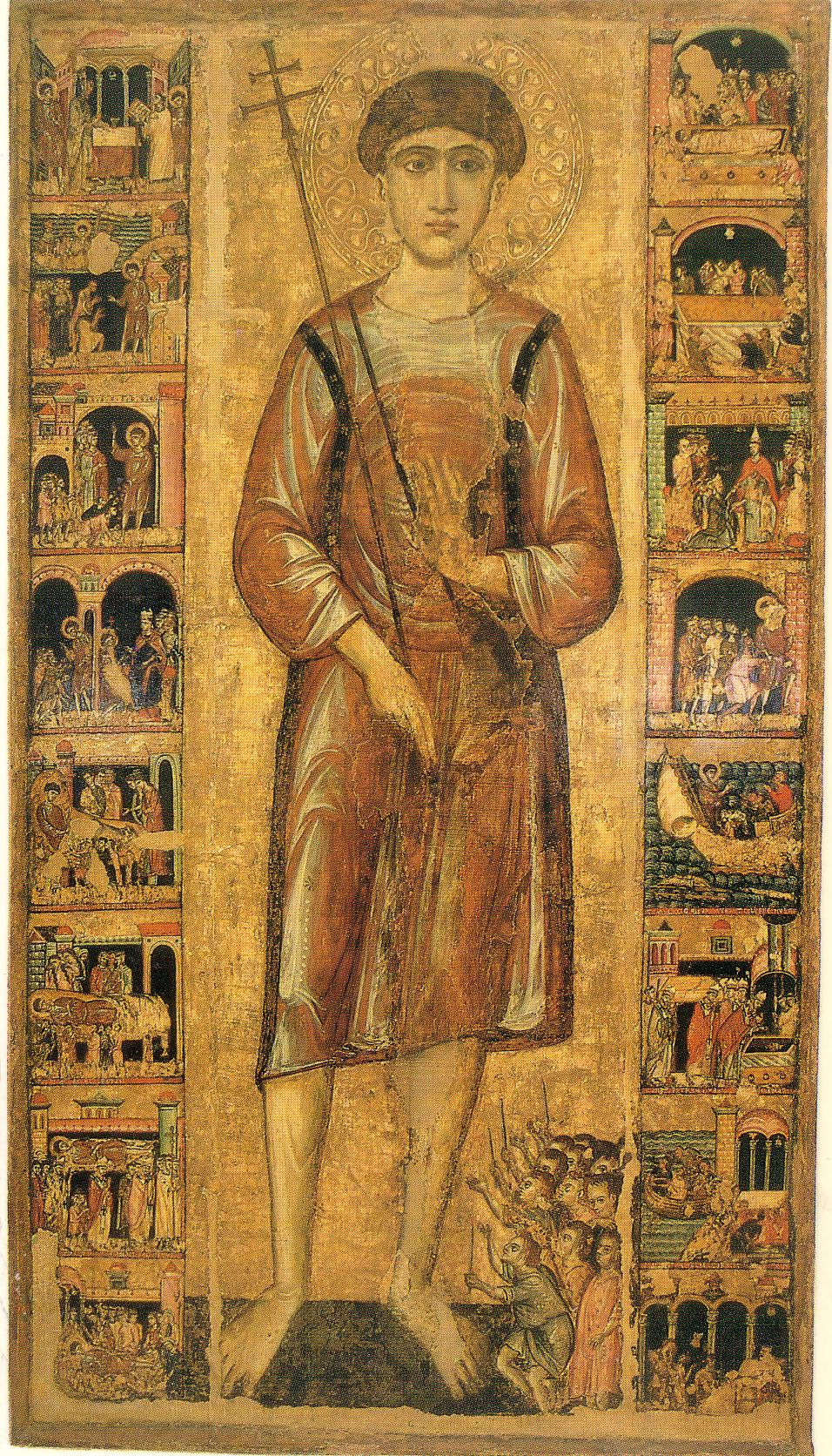
- Icon of St. Nicholas the Pilgrim (Nicholas Peregrinus).

Fool for Christ
- Born: 1075; Steiri, Boeotia, Greece.
- Died: 2 June 1094; Trani, Apulia, Italy.
- Venerated in: Catholic Church; Eastern Orthodox Church
- Canonized: 1098, Papal State by Pope Urban II
- Major shrine: Trani Cathedral
- Feast: June 2.
- Attributes: A beardless man wearing a brown robe and holding a cross, always bare-footed
- Patronage: Youth

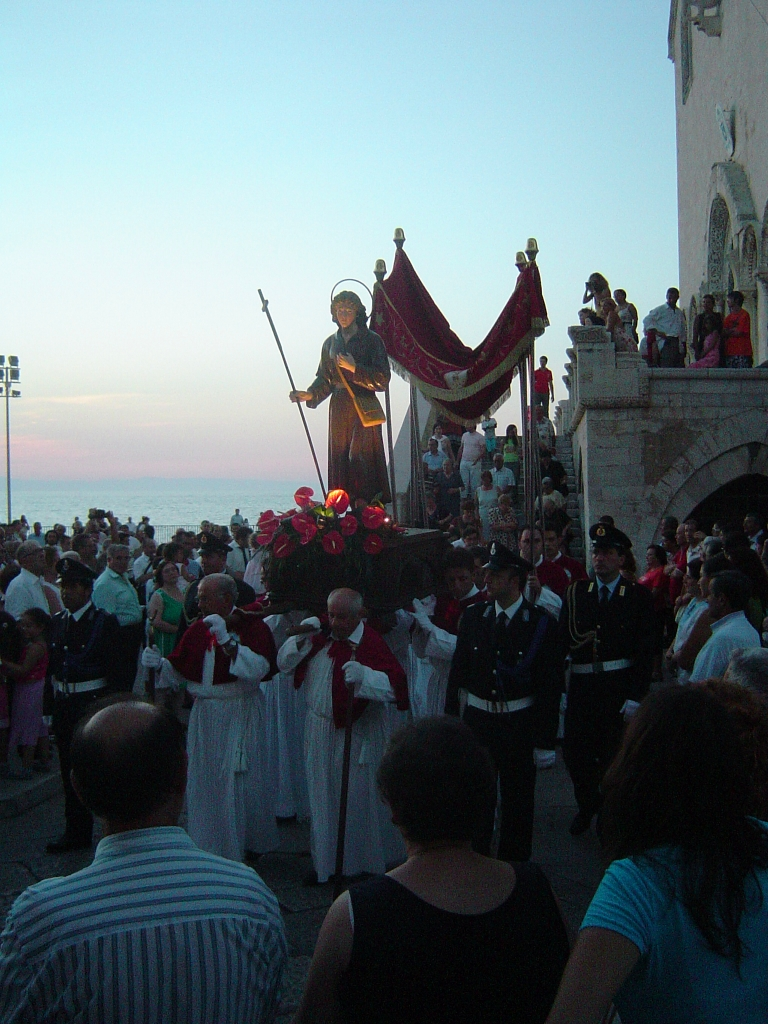
Figure of Saint Nicholas during the annual procession in his honour in Trani

Nicholas the Pilgrim (Italian: Nicola il Pellegrino; Greek: Άγιος Νικόλαος ο Προσκυνητής; 1075 – 2 June 1094), sometimes Nicholas of Trani, is a saint of the Catholic Church and Eastern Orthodox Church.

== Biography ==
Nicholas was born at Steiri in Boeotia, Greece, where his solitary life as a shepherd led him to contemplative spirituality, as part of which he developed the constant repetition of the phrase Kyrie Eleison. This brought him conflict and aggression in populated places, and he suffered much oppression. His mother, believing that he was possessed by demons, sent him to live at the Hosios Loukas monastery but the monks became annoyed with his almost insane behaviour, such as the constant exclamation of the Kyrie Eleison, and expelled him.

When he was nineteen, Nicholas decided to go on a pilgrimage to Rome. In Naupaktos he embarked on a ship to Otranto and spent some time in the Greek-populated regions in Apulia before dying in Trani.

== Veneration ==
Three years after Nicholas' death, archbishop Bisantius of Trani commissioned the building of a new cathedral dedicated to Nicholas and asked in 1098/99 while participating in the Lateran council Pope Urban II for his permission for the sanctification of Nicholas. Trani Cathedral is dedicated to him, and he is the patron saint of the city. Nicholas' life is known primarily from three sources, of which the earliest was written three years after his death based on information provided by his travel companion Bartholomew. Despite dying as a Roman Catholic, he was nonetheless recognized as a saint among the Orthodox.

His feast day is 2 June. The annual procession through Trani in his honour is held in the last week of July. In Orthodox tradition he is regarded as a Fool for Christ.

== Sources ==
- Cioffari, Gerardo, 1994: San Nicola Pellegrino. Levante editore
- Archdiocese of Trani, Barletta, Bisceglie and Nazareth (publ.), 2004: San Nicola il Pellegrino: Atti, testimonianze e liturgie in occasione dei festeggiamenti del IX centenario della sua morte. 10 anni dopo. Trani
- Natale Albino, Ad ogni passo, ad ogni battito. Storia del pellegrino Nicola, Edizioni Dehoniane Bologna (EDB), Bologna 2024.
