= Bertrand II (archbishop of Trani) =

Bertrand II (died 1187) was the Archbishop of Trani from 1157 until his death. In 1167 he was sent to Constantinople to arrange a marriage alliance for William II with the Byzantine Empire. He also exposed a conspiracy by Maio of Bari to kill Robert of San Giovanni. His successor was Samarus.
