= Canne =

Canne may refer to:

- Canne, Apulia, or Cannae, an ancient village in Italy
- Kanne, or Canne in Old French, a village in Belgium
- Canne (Cosson), a river in France, tributary of the Cosson
- Canne (Aron) a river in France, tributary of the Aron
- Canne (weapon), used in a French martial art
- John Canne, 17th-century Englishman

== See also ==
- Cannae (disambiguation)
- Cannes, a city in France
- Cann (disambiguation)
- Kanne
