= William Cann =

William Cann may refer to:

- William Derwood Cann Jr. (1919–2010), college professor, manufacturing executive, and interim mayor of Monroe, Louisiana
- Billy Cann (1882–1958), rugby league player
- Billy Cann (politician) from 2011 Prince Edward Island general election
- William Cann of the Cann baronets
- 1974 assassination of William Cann, police chief of Union City, California

== See also ==
- William Conrad (1920–1994), born John William Cann, actor
- Cann (disambiguation)
