= Cann =

Cann may refer to:

- Cann (surname), a list of people with the name
- Cann River, a river of Victoria, Australia
- Cann, Dorset, a village in England
- Cann baronets, a former baronetcy
- CANN (Compute Architecture of Neural Networks), part of Huawei's MindSpore software framework.

== See also ==
- Cann Hall, a district of the London Borough of Waltham Forest
- McCann (disambiguation)
- Kann (disambiguation)
- Can (disambiguation)
- Canne (disambiguation)
- Cannes, a city in France
