= Church of the Holy Family (Barletta) =

Church in Barletta, Italy

- Chiesa della Sacra Famiglia
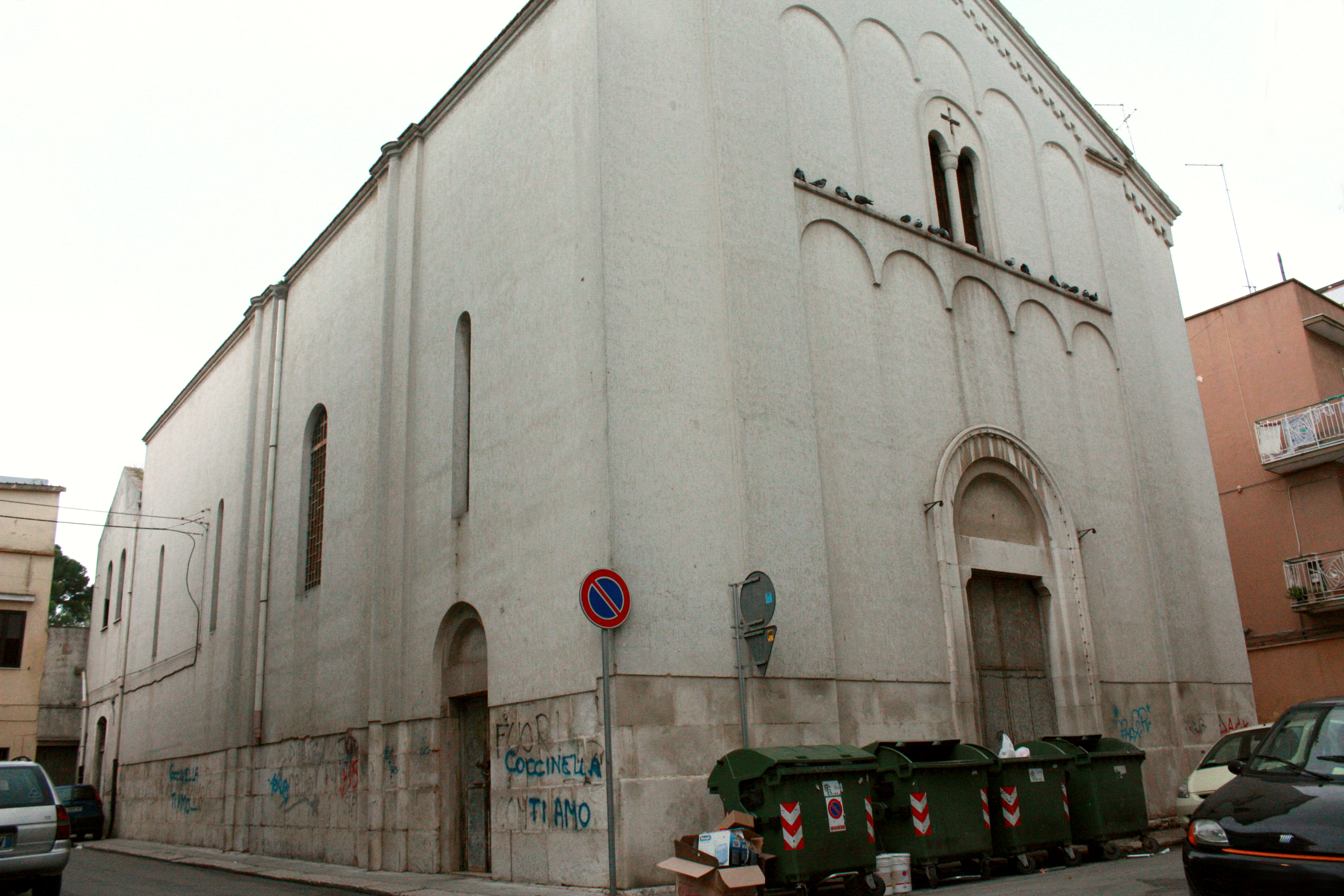

- 41.313611°N 16.269167°E
- Location: Barletta, Apulia, Italy
- Denomination: Catholic
- Website: http://www.parrocchiasacrafamigliabarletta.it/

History
- Consecrated: 1990

Architecture
- Architect: Franco Martino
- Style: Neo-Romanesque
- Groundbreaking: May 6, 1984
- Completed: December 8, 1990

Administration
- Archdiocese: Roman Catholic Archdiocese of Trani-Barletta-Bisceglie

The Church of the Holy Family (Italian: Chiesa della Sacra Famiglia) is a Catholic place of worship located in the territory of the Italian municipality of Barletta, in the province of Barletta-Andria-Trani in Apulia. It is a parish complex built in the 1990s in Via Canosa, replacing the church building erected in the early 20th century in the Borgovilla-Patalini district, more precisely in Via Trento. The original church still exists, although it is closed to the public due to its precarious structural condition.

== History ==
=== The original location ===
==== 1908 to 1971 ====
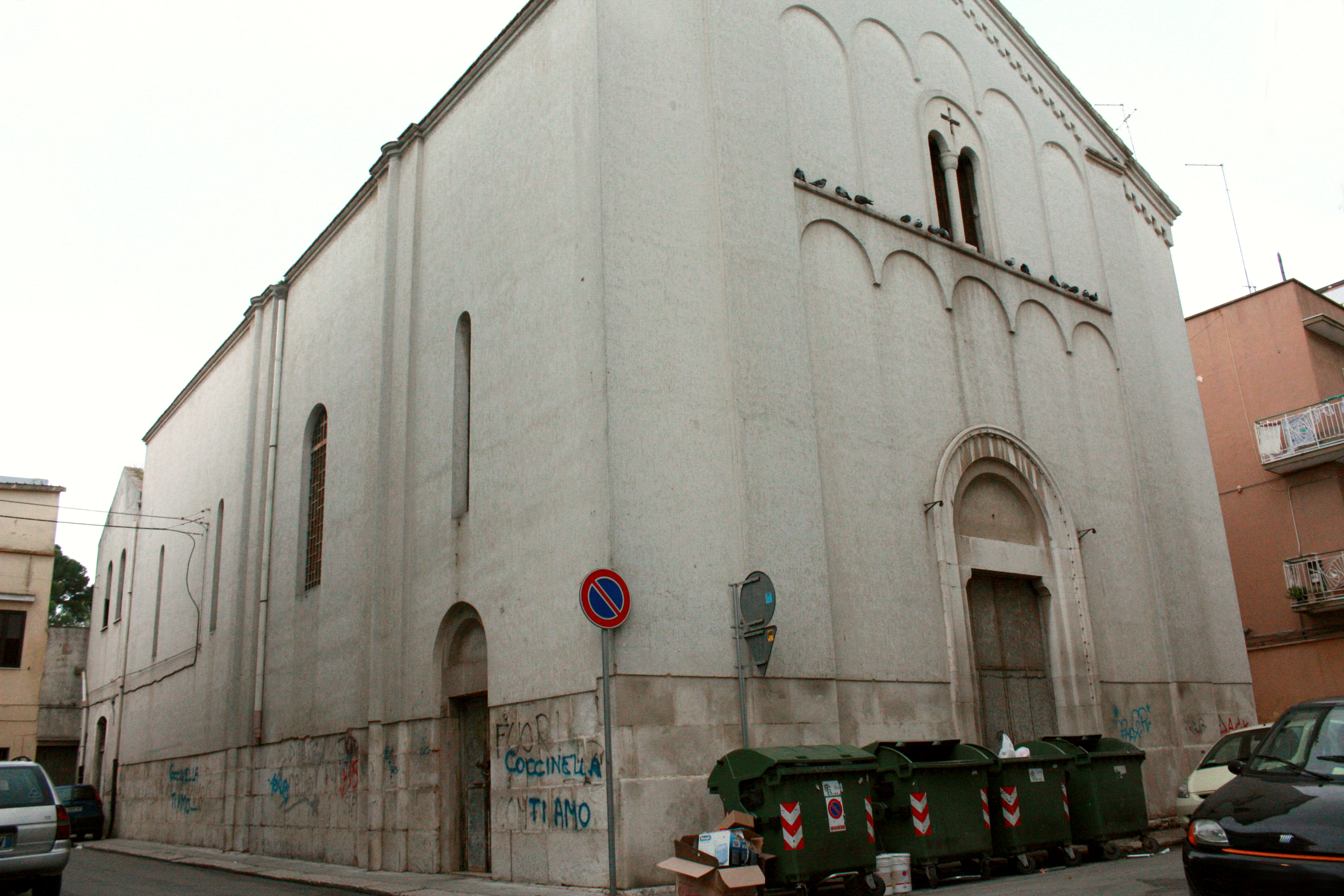
A glimpse of the original location of the Holy Family highlighting its state of disrepair.

The origins of the parish of the Holy Family are rooted in the early twentieth century, when the expansion of the city beyond the urban boundaries dictated by the railroad tracks to the suburbs prompted a perceived need for a house of worship for the emerging Borgovilla Tempio district. Thus it was that there was the construction of a small church among the alleys and twentieth-century tenements, which had as its primary need a constant physical presence of the church rather than large dedicated areas and aggregative spaces, a factor that was also due to economic constraints that did not allow for further building projects. In 1908 a first small church was built with its rectory, which would later become the sacristy of the new church building. The only two parishes existing up to that time in Barletta were the Cathedral of Santa Maria Maggiore and the Church of San Giacomo Maggiore: along with them, the church of the Holy Family would be the third to be raised to the title of parish. The actual church would be erected only in 1917 but would never be consecrated. In order to increase primary education in the emerging ward, in addition to the church built on Via Trento, the St. Theresa of the Child Jesus Institute was built in 1930, located along the road leading to Canosa di Puglia and entrusted to the nuns of the same name. The Second Vatican Council induced, at the end of the 1960s, the contribution of changes that on the one hand highlighted the longitudinality and axiality of the space, in compliance with the conciliar dictates, by means of the resurfacing of the pavement, and on the other would highlight the main altar through the replacement of the side ones with respective aediculae, which would contain two canvases depicting the Madonna of Pompeii and the Christ of Warner Sallman, the latter reproduced by a Barletta painter. The two paintings were then moved to the church's new location; ultimately the altar was rotated, so that the celebrant would be facing the assembly instead of his back according to the requirements of the Second Vatican Council.

=== The new location ===
==== 1971 to 1990 ====
In 1959 Barletta was struck by the tragic event of the collapse of a building in Canosa Street. The parish priest, Fr. Tobia Mascolo, while thinking of the possibility of erecting, in a symbolic way to remember the victims of the collapse, a possible new headquarters of the Holy Family in that very place, which had become small in size by then for the ever-growing suburban town, preferred to abandon the intent immediately because of the long bureaucratic procedures that would have allowed its concession. A few years earlier, precisely in 1951 and 1953, testamentary bequests had been made to the Archdiocese of Barletta-Nazareth of a piece of land just off Canosa Street, at Villa Placida. That same year, 1959 an explicit request was made to the diocese to take possession of that land, and so it was that in 1965 the Archbishop was able to grant it for the construction of the new parish. After due procedures to acquire the surrounding land in 1981, work began on the excavation of the parish center and basement auditorium, currently dedicated to Pope Wojtyla, in which the first liturgical services would be celebrated. The work was completed in 1983 with the inauguration of the new parish and the same auditorium.

The foundation stone of the new church was laid on May 6, 1984. In 1985 there was the delivery of the bells with the subsequent blessing solemnized by the performance of a bell concert performed by pianist and musicologist Francesco Lotoro, organist of the same parish. From 1986 to 1988 the construction of a second parish center was carried out, to be used for educational and liturgical purposes. Once the work was completed, on December 8, 1990, on the solemnity of the Immaculate Conception, the consecration ceremony of the church was celebrated in the presence of Archbishop Monsignor Giuseppe Carata and parish priest Don Donato Lionetti, the initiator and main promoter of the entire architectural work.

==== From 1991 to the present ====
With the consecration of the new Church of the Holy Family, the phase of temporary splitting of functions between the old and the new location that had taken place until 1990 came to an end. In 1993 the parish center was raised by one level, taking advantage of the substantial foundations and the height of the stairwell tower, which allowed the construction of an additional floor while still maintaining a projecting cornice. In that same year, moreover, it was planned to use the space of the courtyard, located between the parish buildings and the residential buildings outside the complex, to design and construct an underground auditorium, consecrated to the memory of Archbishop Addazi, who had previously made possible the construction of the church complex by means of the authorization to proceed with the donation to the parish of some land in the possession of the diocese, donated long before by Canon Rizzi, who lived there. In those years a memorial plaque was affixed to one of the two side tribunes of the church commemorating the dedication of the temple, which reads verbatim:

In the year of the Lord 1990 on the 8th day of the month of December, the feast of the Immaculate Virgin Mary, ruling the universal Church H.H. John Paul II, being Pastor of the Archdiocese of Trani-Barletta-Bisceglie and Nazareth H.E. Archbishop Giuseppe Carata and Parish Priest of this community the Rev. Don Donato Lionetti, the Archbishop consecrated this Sacred Temple to the greater Glory of God and the Redemption of men.
The soil was donated by Canon Don Domenico Rizzi, by Salvatore Rizzi and the children of Ruggero and Immacolata Rizzi.
The work is dedicated to the memory of Mr. and Mrs. Nicola and Immacolata Lionetti, parents of the parish priest and distinguished benefactors, and to all those who contributed to the realization of this work that parish priest Don Donato Lionetti for long years planned and brought to completion in the 35th year of his priesthood and 34th year of pastoral activity carried out in this parish.
Project designers: Eng. Gabriele Lionetti, Arch. Franco Martino, Eng. Alfonso Laurora.
Builders: Edildomus s.p.a. of Santoro and Seccia.

— A.M.D.G.

In 2000, a grotto was built near the main entrance of the church, dedicated to Our Lady of Lourdes. In 2008 in honor of the first centenary of the establishment of the parish, a book written by parish priest Fr. Donato Lionetti was published in memory of the events that affected the church of the Holy Family before and during his years of priesthood. On Sept. 6, 2009, after 35 years of priesthood, 34 of them in the same parish, Fr. Donato Lionetti, having exceeded by two years the maximum age limit allowed for the presbyterate at the behest of Diocesan Archbishop Giovanni Battista Pichierri, took his leave, becoming monsignor and parish priest emeritus. On the same day, with a solemn ceremony, the Eucharistic celebration of canonical induction of the new parish priest, Fr. Giuseppe Tupputi, who was also like his predecessor born in Barletta, was held.

Due to its precarious structural condition, the original church of the Holy Family was included in the program agreement for the municipal district contract, which provides for its renovation.

== Architecture ==
The parish complex of the Holy Family covers an area of 4500 m² and includes the church and bell tower, the main parish center, the secondary parish center, properly called centrino, and the Addazi auditorium. It faces the main front on the road axis leading to Canosa, while the remaining sides are adjacent to the residential settlement of the town, and have two additional secondary entrances located at the back of the complex: one on De Cesare Street, with dual access, a pedestrian one to the clergy house and a driveway to the atrium, and the other on Canfora Street which is solely a driveway. It is placed in an antinodal position with respect to the urban fabric, towards which it establishes a relationship of close correlation due to the proximity, and in some cases the adjacency, of the residential complex. The notion of enclosure is tested in this case, with respect to which the territorial limits of the parish facility are established sometimes by the enclosure proper, sometimes by the pre-existing settlement with which it establishes a direct relationship. The designers of the work are, in addition to the aforementioned architect Franco Martino, engineers Gabriele Lionetti, Alfonso Laurora and Vincenzo Binetti.

=== The church ===
==== Exterior ====
===== The facade =====
The main front of the church faces Canosa Street. The relationship between the parish complex and the main traffic route of the area, as well as the axis from which the SS 93 begins, is mediated by a curtain wall that acts as a visual screen with respect to the built-up area behind. The main front is punctured in three places to leave space for the main arched access to the southwest and a driveway access to the northeast, which is also bordered above by a semicircular arch, alongside which is another smaller entrance for the disabled. The façade, which is 45 meters long, is vertically distinguished in a white-colored horizontal band of reinforced concrete that runs along its entire length, above which runs a railing with vertical elements interspersed with Greek crosses of the same material; the two bands are interrupted only by the three entrances and slight gaps placed near the pillars to give them greater prominence. Above, the facade, in this case white in color, goes on in a continuous manner from the bottom to the top from the western end to the two secondary entrances to the east, interrupting only to leave room for the bell tower. Along the entire façade, at a height of about six meters, runs a bronze inscription set into the white background of the wall that reads "Let the harmonies of the bells and the organ and the exultant voices of the faithful sing in this holy temple the longing for You O God." The wall portion that continues to the eastern end, though still made of reinforced concrete and white in color, is of a lower height than the adjacent one and slightly detached from it. A circular mosaic depicting the Holy Family is embedded at the top of the curtain wall of greater width, while at the upper end of the wall of lesser height there is a metal cross with a semicircular base carved into the wall.

===== The churchyard =====
The main entrance is arched and the crossing of two steps leads to a triangular area that offers the possibility of rotating the main axis of the church by 45º. In this way, the liturgical hall is arranged with one of its sides parallel to the velarium, from which it deviates, determining a gap in which is placed an access ramp for the disabled that connects the minor access with the parvise and allows the overcoming of architectural barriers. Accessing instead from the main entrance, past the first two steps there are four more before reaching the churchyard. This serves as the starting point toward the exit for the disabled on one side, the rear of the complex and access to the parish centers on the other, and centrally toward the triple entrance portal that gives access to a room that precedes the actual liturgical hall, placing itself in axis with the altar. The entrance to the assembly hall is thus mediated by an additional room that serves as a narthex.

==== Interior ====
===== The entrance pronaos =====
The entrance is tripartite by four pillars, which will determine and support the roof of the church, between which are three rectangular portals with solid oak doors at the center of which is a glazed cross. This room turns out to be a kind of entrance pronaos, that is, a junction area against which on either side are two tribunes, in communication with the church through a glazed surface. These have the dual function of accommodating the faithful both during Mass and outside the Eucharistic celebration for moments of personal recollection. From the gallery located to the right with respect to the main entrance there is access to a vertical distribution space, in which by means of a spiral staircase it is possible to reach the upper floor, which serves at the same time as a covering floor for the entrance alone and the side rooms, and from which one reaches the choir loft, located above the triple entrance portal and the bell tower.

===== The liturgical hall =====
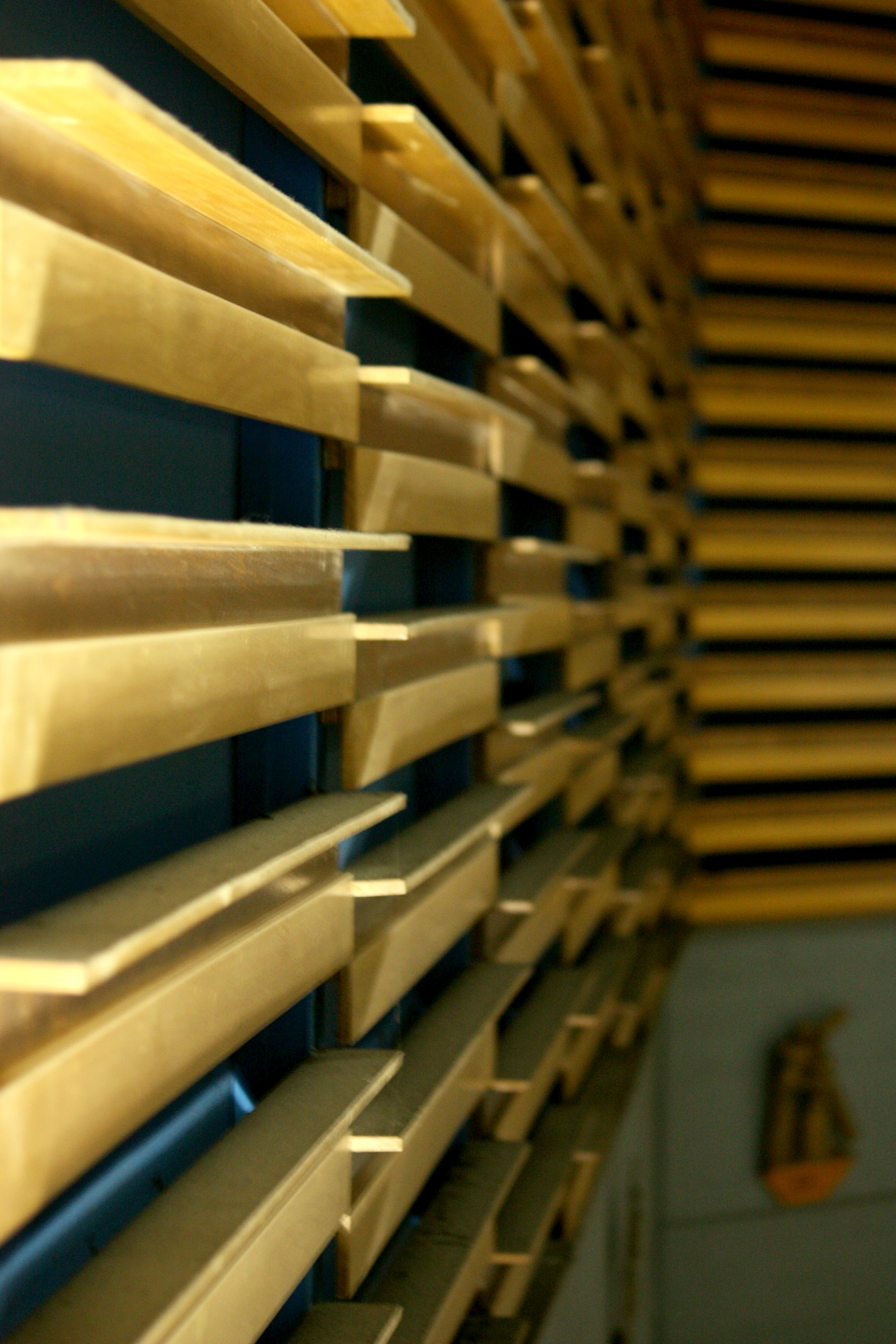
Detail of the wooden stave covering the upper part of the liturgical hall.

The liturgical hall turns out to be a square, placed with one side parallel to the road axis to Canosa, with the vertices cut off so as to obtain a final outer octagon having four longer sides and as many sides of smaller dimensions, obtained by shearing the vertices and orthogonal to the diagonals of the general square: the long sides are two by two equal to each other while the shorter sides feature three sides of the same size, equal to the width of an entrance portal, and the fourth of larger size, corresponding to the span of three portals spaced by the pillars; a regular inner octagon. The path of entry leads directly to the presbyteral area and in particular stands in axis with the fixed altar, characterized by a single block of white-colored natural stone. Perfectly orthogonal and central compared to the first path is the counter axis at the ends of which there is an exit portal leading respectively to the disabled entrance on Canosa Street and to an internal parking area at the bottom with a historiated glass surface. Other similar stained glass windows can be found in the side tribunes, at the ends of the chancel. The internal conformation of the church established by the two perpendicular paths divides the hall into four distinct portions in which the solid oak pews are arranged. The size of the pews is at their maximum at the point closest to the center of the church; at their minimum near the main exit and the altar, so as to maintain a constant distance from the walls of the hall and thus virtually drawing an additional inner octagon to the perimeter one. The pavement features a slight slope, decreasing from the entrance to the central point of the church; the remaining area up to the chancel, on the other hand, is characterized by the reverse slope, although of lesser magnitude. Assuming that the entire church was designed with the construction criterion of béton brut so that the warping of the wooden boards used as formwork is visible, a definite order in height, from bottom to top, is observed in the use of materials for the interior: granite slabs serve as a continuous base around the entire perimeter of the hall, interrupting only at the presbytery area; a horizontal wooden plank cladding concluded at the top by a band of greater height as far as the half of the hall closest to the altar is concerned, while a paved cladding of gray granite alternates with one of lesser width in white for the half of the hall farthest away; a beam that serves as a continuous pediment around the entire perimeter of the church in béton brut and separates the lower from the upper part, on which are affixed the Stations of the Cross, characterized by a wooden boat and the superimposed liturgical scene in copper; a counter-wall detached from the concrete wall, warped horizontally with wooden laths arranged alternately according to the two minor dimensions; a concrete band at the upper conclusion. Affixed to the wall lined with wooden staves to the right of the chancel is the tabernacle, surmounted by a baldachin. In the assembly hall there are two paintings placed on the two walls covered in wooden stave respectively: one consists of Warner Sallman's reproduction of Christ, the other of the icon of Our Lady of Pompeii, both oval in shape. The liturgical hall, which is octagonal in shape, is characterized by a pseudo-polar layout, having a considerable degree of organicity due to the two main paths perpendicular to each other, which is typical of polar layouts, yet since the entrance-altar axis hierarchically subordinates the counter-axis, becoming more important, it is possible to establish a definition of non-absolute polarity.

The presbytery

The orientation of the church with a main east-west axis, with the entrance to the west and the presbytery area to the east, as per CEI prescriptions as well as significant symbolism that sees the East as Light, and therefore as God, is faithfully maintained in both the layout of the hall and the presbytery. The latter is raised by means of a 10-centimeter basement, covered with white stone slabs, and has the geometric shape of an isosceles trapezoid: what ideally represents the major base of the trapezoid constitutes the access side to the collegiate area; the minor base is centrally equipped with a triple wooden presidential seat, raised by an additional 10 centimeters, which constitutes the actual seat of the presbyter and possibly the deacon and subdeacon; the presidential seat is bordered laterally by two exposed concrete pillars; on their respective sides a continuous seat runs concluding the minor base and engaging two-thirds of the oblique sides, at the end of which a passageway opens on either side leading into the sacristy. The equal sides of the presbytery trapezoid act as theatrical wings, detaching themselves from the perimeter walls of the liturgical hall and forming an uncovered corridor above that leads to the sacristy. The extension of this corridor toward the assembly offered the design opportunity to devise a room used as a confessional, separated from and communicating with it at the same time through a wooden door and directly with the hall, as remarked by the pastoral note The Design of New Churches, according to which the connection with the place where the Eucharist is celebrated is important. The back walls of the chancel are entirely mosaic-covered. On the chancel are the fixed liturgical furnishings, as in the post-conciliar Catholic tradition, centrally the altar, that is, a block of white stone, bearing a Greek cross, also made of stone, on the vertical surface facing the assembly; the ambon, placed to its right; the baptismal font, where the sacramental rite of baptism by sprinkling is celebrated when necessary near which there is also the Paschal candle, set in a marble base.

The choir

It is located at the entrance, elevated as a balcony, at the same height as the octagonal beam-pediment that surrounds the entire church and forms the balustrade of the choir itself. It is accessed from the tribune located to the right of the entrance narthex, where there is a spiral staircase in a service tower leading to the second floor of the roof. The choir constitutes the place intended for the cantors, but also for the placement of the organ with electric transmission and actual stops. This provides for the presence of a console with two keyboards arranged centrally, between the two entrance pillars, on which are the trumpets, while the pipes are arranged not only on an axis with respect to the keyboards but also on both sides, thus occupying the space of the entire tripartition of the entrance to the church below. In the area on either side of the organist's position is located the schola cantorum.

The roof

It is a flat octagonal roof, characterized by the intersection of two high beams that unload their weight on the pillars placed on the cut-off vertices of the plan square. The beams in the roof correspond to the projection of the main entrance-altar path and the counter-axis orthogonal to it that leads to the two side exits and result in a double skylight of 96 meters of span. The flat areas not covered by the skylight and the beams are the result of brick floors, with orthogonal warping on the sides of the octagon.

The sacristy

It is accessed through the two stage wings carved out on either side of the presbytery area, protected by a wooden door of similar workmanship to those at the entrance to the church. In addition to being the place for the dressing of the presbyter and altar servers and the storage of liturgical vestments this also serves as a direct access point to the parish center and the rectory.

=== The bell tower ===
The bell tower, about 28 meters high, is planimetrically quadrangular in shape, although the small size of the side parallel to the façade on Canosa Street gives the impression of a triangular shape with a cut-off apex. This stands at the southwestern end of the parish complex, near its main entrance. It is entirely walled except along some oblong holes made of anticorodal staves, which allow light to filter inside while preventing the intrusion of birds. A cross made of the same aluminum alloy as the staved window and door frames stands out at the top of the bell tower. Inside the tower are the bells, which are equipped with an electrical transmission system that enables their movement. It maneuvers eight main bells that give rise to a concert in F major plus two smaller ones through the use of which a three-tone concert is achieved. The addition of the last two bells was conceived later than the first eight, based on a project directed by the parish priest and promoter of the entire architectural work, Don Donato Lionetti. The concert designed in the first instance included precisely:

- F 710 kg.
- G 510 kg.
- A 370 kg.
- Bb 310 kg.
- C 210 kg.
- D 160 kg.
- E 105 kg.
- F 88 kg.

Later were added:

- Eb 125 kg.
- G 60 kg.

=== The parish center ===
It is directly connected with the church through the sacristy. This is characterized by an almost square surface with the vertical distribution space placed on a vertex and oriented along one of the two diagonals. Initially equipped with four levels, one of which is a basement, the 1993 elevation brought the total to five levels. The entrance to the building is located on De Cesare Street, a dead-end street at the end of which there is driveway access to the playground and laterally the pedestrian access to the building. The basement features an auditorium dedicated to Pope Wojtyla, which was used for liturgical services in the early years of the building's construction. Natural lighting and ventilation are provided by a series of 70-cm-high windows. Then there is the floor communicating with the sacristy where there are the parish priests' offices, secretariat, archives, classrooms for pastoral and educational activities, and a weekday chapel dedicated to Our Lady of Trust. On the upper floors, on the other hand, there is the rectory, classrooms for catechism, and a top level with additional classrooms and an auditorium dedicated to the founder and initiator of the entire church complex, Don Donato. The building is connected to the entirely underground Addazi auditorium by a passageway made in the basement and is equipped with an elevator that provides access from the outside to the various levels.

There is then an additional building used for pastoral activities. This is adjacent on two sides with as many residential dwellings, while it faces the other two inside the parish courtyard. It has four levels, one of which is a basement and one with one side set back from the main façade to make room for a balcony: except for the smaller, rectangular top floor, it consists of three square studios seven meters on a side, stacked one on top of the other, served by a stairwell with associated toilet facilities. The basement floor is ventilated and illuminated by a series of eighty-centimeter-high windows and the two upper floors by large windowed areas; the top floor, on the other hand, turns out to be a kind of attic, with balcony access. The center is used for both teaching and liturgical functions, with classrooms equipped with an ambon, presidential seat and a crucifix.

=== The Addazi Auditorium ===
The auditorium is an underground hall with dimensions of 23 by 17 meters. It is a reinforced concrete framed structure, characterized by seven pillars, spaced with constant pitch, placed at the tapered side ends so as to have a smaller section at the lower end and a larger one at the upper end. The pillars are connected by one-meter-high intrados beams, visible under the floor slab, and at the same time by an equal number of beams of the same characteristics placed under the floor, forming a series of framed rings The auditorium is used both as a conference hall and for internal theatrical performances in the parish, but above all for expressly liturgical use. The hall features an elevated presidential seat, and on the wall behind it is an iconostasis and an immersion baptismal font dug into the ground, octagonal in shape with the stairs arranged to form a Greek cross. Access is both from the courtyard and from the parish center by a system of stairs but also by an elevator located in the courtyard itself, which allows architectural barriers to be overcome. The dedication of the auditorium is to Archbishop Monsignor Addazi, who at the time granted permission for the donation of the land on which the parish complex now stands.

== Artistic analysis ==
=== The mosaics ===
The mosaics of the parish complex are present as much on the exterior as on the interior of the church. Mosaics are in fact the semicircular arches of the two main entrances characterized by multiple tonal variations of yellow. At the top of the facade is a rose window, two meters in diameter, consisting of tiles depicting the icon of the Holy Family. Inside the liturgical hall, the mosaic theme is noticeably present: the back wall of the chancel is entirely mosaicked with tiles, the color of which strongly echoes that of the arches and the image outside. In particular, the tripartite facade of the presbytery area is articulated in the following way: it is divided into a composition of six quadrilaterals, three lower and three upper, divided vertically by the reinforced concrete beam; horizontally, on the other hand, they are separated by the two pillars, which thus isolate the central portion, diversifying it from the lateral ones by the characterization of the mosaic itself. The side surfaces placed at the bottom turn, with the same texture, on the stage wings, which, opening to the passage, allow one to reach the sacristy behind. The four side walls are designed according to an arrangement of the different color tones of the tiles that restores a horizontal warp of beams ranging from white to golden and from ochre to brown, passing through those in between. The lower central surface repeats the theme of the Greek cross, exalted several times throughout the entire parish complex, this time standing symbolically behind the presbyter. The upper central surface, on the other hand, features an altarpiece with the icon of the Holy Family in the Byzantine style, thus included between the pillars spaced two meters apart, which tends to detach itself from the gilded background, with St. Joseph, the Virgin Mary and Jesus, not yet an adult. On either side of the icon of the Holy Family find place two other mosaics, also in Byzantine style, of two angels, symbolically facing the Holy Family.

=== The stained glass windows ===
There are a total of eight stained glass windows in the liturgical hall, two of which can be partially opened: there are two vertical ones and broken down into a corner window, two square ones placed on the side exits, two horizontal ones in the side tribunes for the faithful, and two vertical ones near the chancel. They represent respectively:

- The Sacrament of Baptism and the Sacrament of Reconciliation;
- The law of love given by God to mankind in the Old and New Testaments;
- The Liturgy of the Word and the Liturgy of the Eucharist;
- St. Peter and St. Paul.

=== The inscriptions ===
On the main exterior front of the church, set into the concrete wall by a construction process whereby the letters were nailed to the formwork before the concrete was poured, there is an inscription in bronze that is 25 cm. high and reads:

Die Harmonie der Glocken und der Orgel und die jubelnde Stimme der Christgläubigen mögen in diesem heiligen Tempel die Sehnsucht nach Dir o Gott singen.
May the harmonies of the bells and the organ and the exultant voices of the faithful sing in this holy time the longing for You O God.

—Novalis, Die Philologischen Wissenschaften

This phrase originates in German Romanticism and presents a strong reference to divine music and the relationship of tension and nostalgia that places man in a continuous search for God.

Inside the liturgical hall, precisely on the octagonal beam that surrounds the church at the chancel is the second inscription, taken from Psalm 62, which reads:

O God, Thou art my God, earnestly will I seek Thee; My soul thirsteth for Thee, my flesh longeth for Thee,
In a dry and weary land, where no water is.

— Psalms, Psalm 62

Like the inscription on the outside of the church, this phrase is also meant to express the believer's indispensable need to seek God, but in this case as a vital daily need, as the soul after the original sin.

=== Symbolism ===
There are numerous recurring symbolic themes throughout the parish complex and particularly in the house of worship. More specifically:

- the octagon and the number 8: in Christian symbolism, the number 8 represents the transfiguration and the New Testament. The 8th day announces eternity, the resurrection of Christ and the resurrection of man.
- the Greek cross, characterized by the dimensional equality of the two arms, present: in the very constitution of the roof of the building of worship, which through the intersection of four beams composes a skylight that is 96 meters in length; in the form of the crosses that intersperse the Stations of the Cross affixed all around the church along the octagonal beam; on the altar, a cross made up of stone laths facing the faithful; on the backdrop surface of the chancel, mosaicked and emerging from the tiles that make up its background;
- the concept of "tension" between God and man, expressed in the inscriptions and manifested in the constant reminder between the harmony of the music emanating from the organ placed inside the church and the inscription that is outside. Moreover, the term tension, in the etymological sense of tending, when translated from German has been synthesized into the meaning of the term nostalgia, which best represents the feeling that drives man to search for God. The same tension is felt in the inscription placed inside the church in which Psalm 62 compares man to a parched land without water and therefore naturally in need of the divine presence.

== The parish ==
The parish of the Holy Family is home to seven thousand residents in the Borgovilla district of Barletta, placing it, according to the estimates of the Archdiocese of Trani-Barletta-Bisceglie and Nazareth (Archidioecesis Tranensis-Barolensis-Vigiliensis-Nazarensis in Latin), in second place in terms of the number of inhabitants served, after the church of the Immaculate Heart, which is instead populated by 12,600 residents. The parish complex extends into the outskirts of the city on an almost rectangular lot, standing mainly on a main urban traffic route, as well as an axis that leads to Canosa di Puglia, near Villa Bonelli. It has three different ecclesiastical paths within it: Catholic Action, the Neocatechumenal Way and the Renewal in the Spirit. In the past it has also hosted the group Infuocati per Dio. The Feast of the Holy Family of Nazareth is celebrated on the Sunday between Christmas and New Year's Day.

=== The Confraternity of the Holy Family ===
The centuries-old history of the Confraternity of the Holy Family began in 1910 in conjunction with the construction of the ancient church, elevated to parish status with the other only two parish churches of Santa Maria Maggiore and San Giacomo Maggiore. The usual colors of the clothes worn are red for the mozzetta edged with gold embroidery, white for the alb with buttons and a sky blue cincture, to which is added the medallion with the icon of the Holy Family carved in high relief.

== See also ==
- Barletta

== Bibliography ==
- Ceci, Rita; Mascolo, Ruggero (1986). Barletta, leggere la città. Barletta: Edizioni Libreria Liverini.
- Lionetti, Donato (2007). Parrocchia Sacra Famiglia Barletta - Nuova sede. Storia e immagini nel primo centenario di fondazione 1908-2008. Barletta: Rotas. ISBN 978-88-87927-89-4.
- Russo, Renato (1998). Le cento chiese di Barletta - Dagli ordini mendicanti al XX secolo. Barletta: Rotas.
- Russo, Renato (2004). Barletta. La storia. Barletta: Rotas. ISBN 88-87927-47-2.
- Strappa, Giuseppe (1995). Unità dell'organismo architettonico. Bari: Dedalo. ISBN 88-220-1855-9.
- Strappa, Giuseppe (2005). Edilizia per il culto. Torino: Utet. ISBN 88-02062-87-0.
