= Roger of Cannae =

Italian Roman Catholic saint

Saint Roger of Cannae
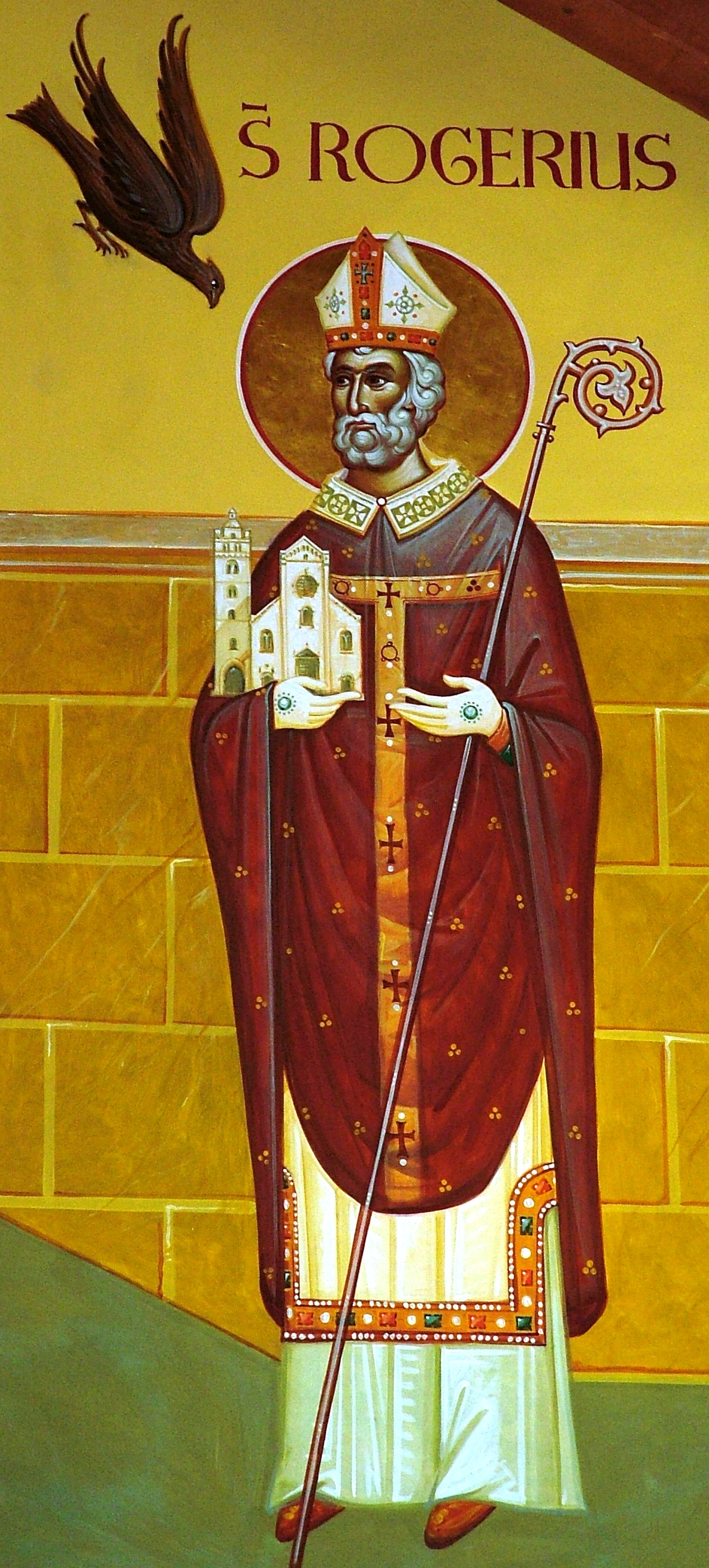

Bishop
- Born: 1060; Cannae, Italy
- Died: 30 December 1129; Cannae, Italy
- Venerated in: Catholic Church
- Feast: December 30
- Attributes: eagle, Pontifical vestments
- Patronage: Barletta

Saint Roger of Cannae (1060 – December 30, 1129) was an Italian bishop. The Catholic Church honours him as a saint.

== Biography ==
Roger (in Italian: Ruggero di Canne) was elected bishop of the town of Cannae. In 1083, the town was destroyed, with the exception of the cathedral and the episcopal residence, by Robert Guiscard, due to the opposition of the Norman barons.

Roger contributed to the moral and material reconstruction of the ancient city of Apulia, supporting his fellow citizens with the consolations of faith and the material aid.

He carried out the reforms of Pope Gregory VII, lived as an ascetic and provided for the poor. The Cannes Anonymous, an ancient local biographical sources of the 14th century, reveals some aspects of the personality of Roger: "He was very gracious et zealous for the salvation of souls [...] his bishop-house was a pure hospiti that was always open to accommodate the pilgrims and poor".

He was present in September 1101 for the re-dedication of the Cathedral of San Sabino in Canosa di Puglia. Some documents of that period show that the bishop was often consulted by popes Gelasius II and Paschal II to settle certain questions of law and quell the rivalry between the Churches and the community.

Roger died December 30, 1129, and was buried in the cathedral of Cannae. Shortly after, his relics were taken to the near city of Barletta, but later returned.

His memorial is celebrated on 30 December, as reported by the Roman Martyrology.
