= Cann (surname) =

Cann is an English surname. Early occurrences of the name are found in north Dorset and Cornwall. The probable derivation is either from the Dorset village of Cann, or from the Old English "canne" meaning a can or cup (so the name would mean someone dwelling in a hollow or deep valley).

Notable people with the surname include:

- Abraham Cann (died 1864), English sport wrestler
- Adrian Cann, Canadian soccer player
- A. J. Cann (born 1991), American football player
- Alan Cann (born 1971), Australian rugby league footballer
- Alexander Cann (1903–1977), Canadian-Australian actor and filmmaker
- Billy Cann (1882–1958), Australian rugby league footballer
- Claire and Antoinette Cann, "Cann Twins", (born 1963), duo-pianists
- Darren Cann (footballer), English footballer
- Darren Cann (assistant referee), English assistant football referee
- Elizabeth Cann (born 1979), English badminton player
- Frank H. Cann (1863–1935), American football coach
- George Cann, Australian politician
- Gerald A. Cann, United States Assistant Secretary of the Navy
- Harry Cann, British footballer
- Howard Cann, American basketball coach
- Jamie Cann, British politician
- John Cann (athlete), Australian hurdles champion
- John Cann (politician) (1860–1940), Australian politician
- John William Cann (1946–2011), guitarist with Atomic Rooster, stage name John Du Cann
- Johnson Cann (born 1937), British geologist
- Kate Cann (born 1954), English journalist and writer
- Kid Cann, American gangster
- Lionel Cann (born 1972), Bermudian cricketer
- Luke Cann (born 1994), Australian javelin champion
- Maurice Cann (1911–1989), British motorcycle racer
- Mikala Cann (born 2000), Australian rules footballer with AFLW
- Mike Cann (born 1965), Welsh cricketer
- Rebecca L. Cann, geneticist
- Sir Robert Cann, 1st Baronet, and other Cann baronets
- Sally Cann, birth name of the English presenter Sally James (presenter)
- Sam Cann (born 1954), American politician
- Sid Cann (1911–1996), English footballer and manager
- Steven Cann (born 1988), South African-born Welsh footballer
- Tedford H. Cann (1897–1963), American swimmer, United States Navy officer and Medal of Honor recipient
- Thomas Cann (1858–1924), British trade unionist
- Warren Cann, Canadian drummer
- William Cann, birth name of the American actor William Conrad
- William Derwood Cann Jr., American military officer and politician
- William Henry Cann (1857–1942), Methodist minister in South Australia

== See also ==
- Du Cann, surname
- McCann, surname
