= Monumental Cemetery of Barletta =

Italian monumental cemetery

Cimitero Monumentale di Barletta Monumental Cemetery of Barletta
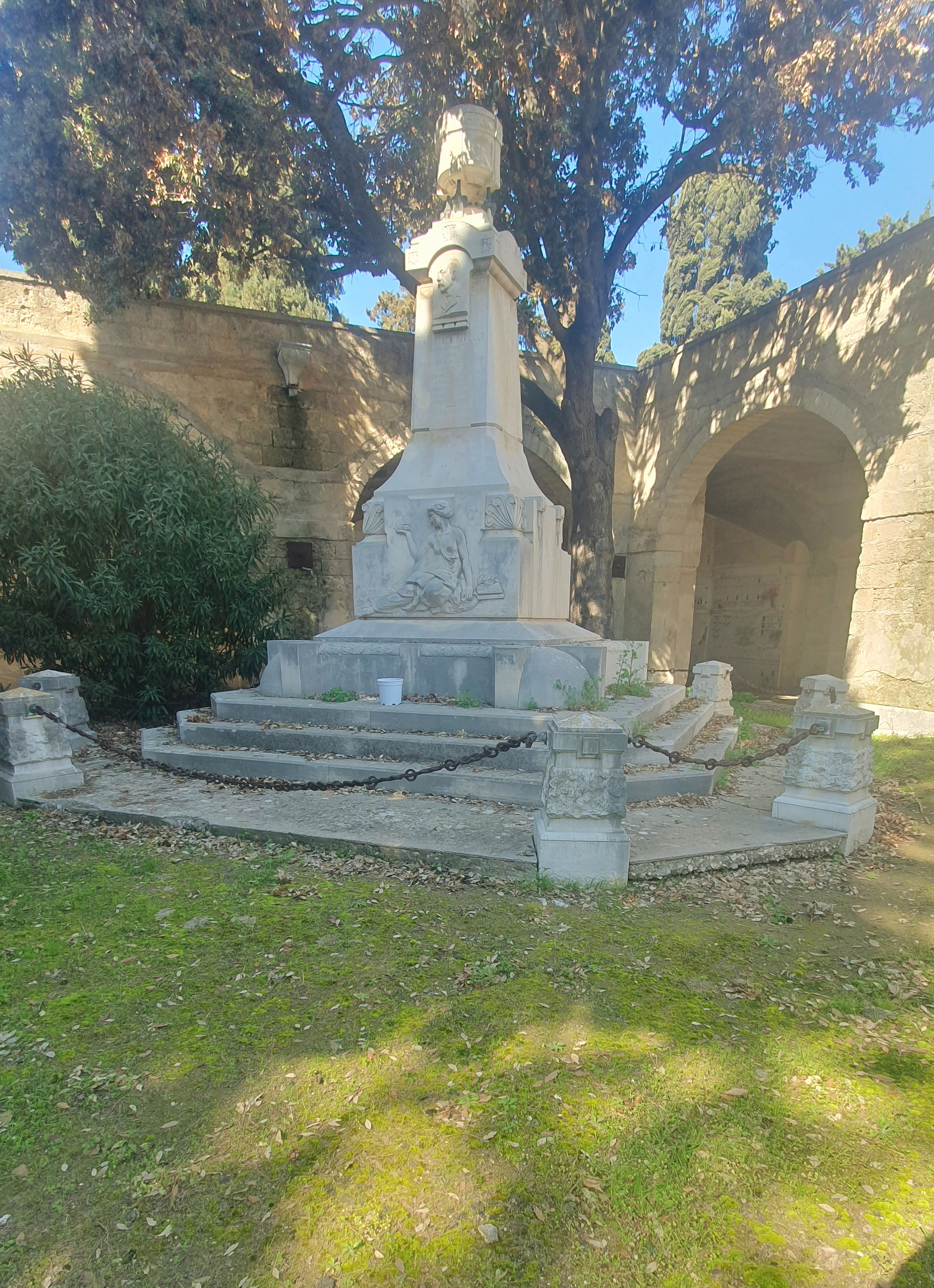
- Family Paolillo Tomb
- Interactive map of Cimitero Monumentale di Barletta; Monumental Cemetery of Barletta

Details
- Established: 1840
- Location: Barletta
- Country: Italy
- Coordinates: 41°17′16″N 16°03′38″E
- Type: Non-denominational
- Owned by: City of Barletta
- Size: 25 hectares (62 acres)
- Website: https://discoverbarletta.com/en/cimitero-monumentale-barletta

The Monumental Cemetery of Barletta is a cemetery in the Italian commute of Barlettta, designed by the architect Francesco Sponzilli.

== History ==
The construction of the cemetery began in 1840, following the edict of Ferdinand II of the Two Sicilies, which provided for the construction of cemeteries outside the urban walls. The project was commissioned to Sponzilli from Barletta, head of the civil engineering, in 1843. The new cemetery was inaugurated in the second half of the 1800s.

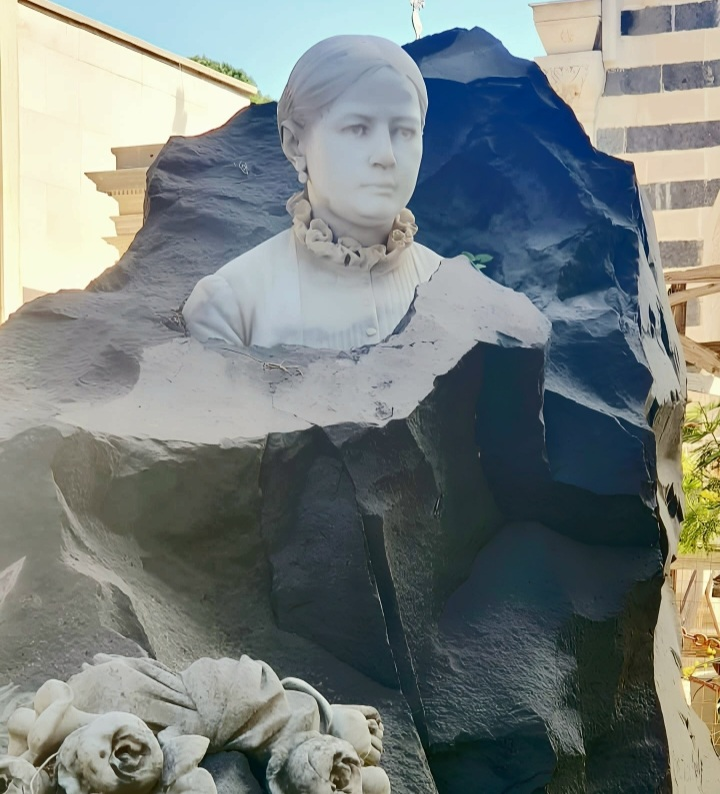
"The Girl", one of the famous monuments

== Monumental sites ==
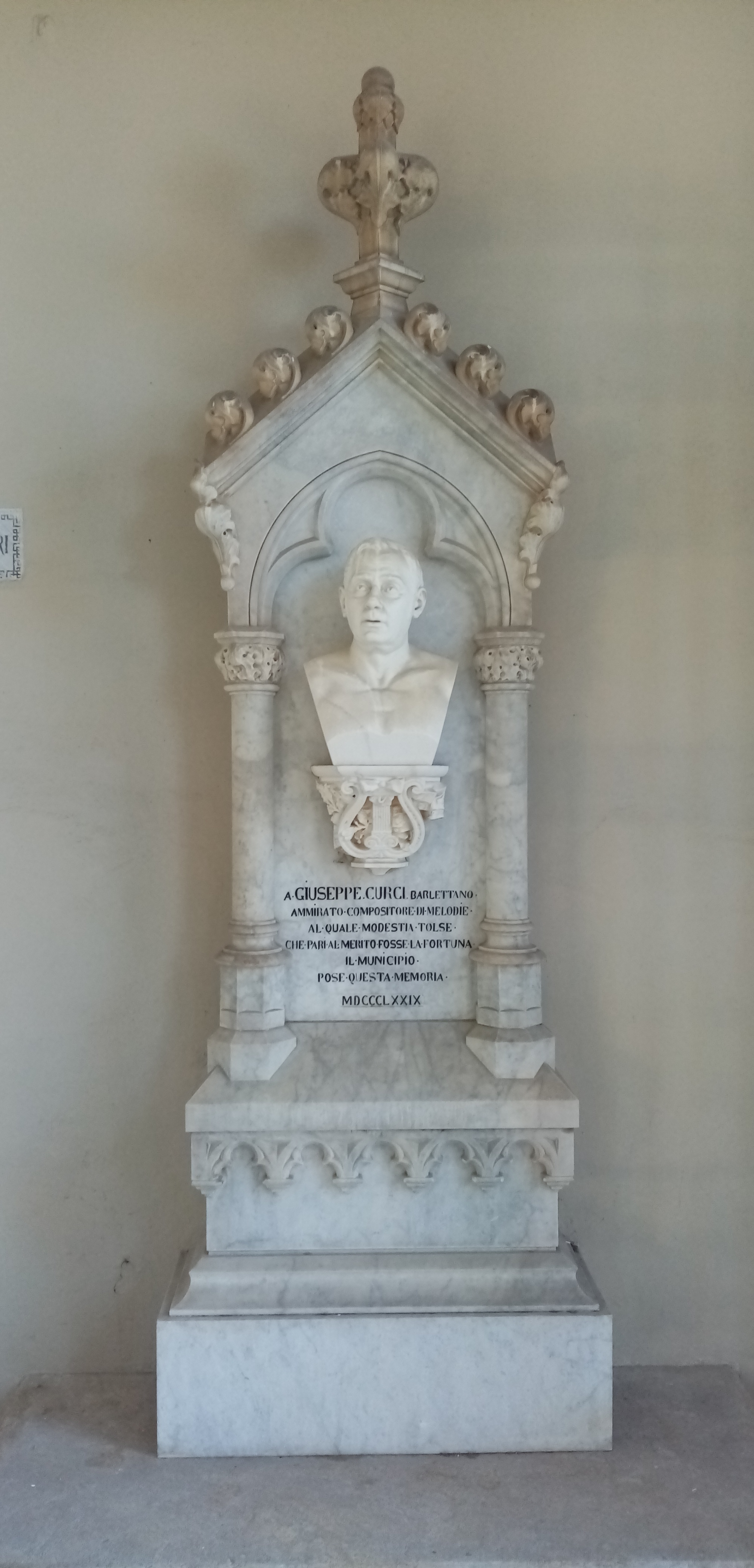
Funerary monument of the composer Giuseppe Curci

In addition to the approximately 80 votive aedicules of particular artistic value, three important monuments can be identified:

=== Greek Cemetery ===
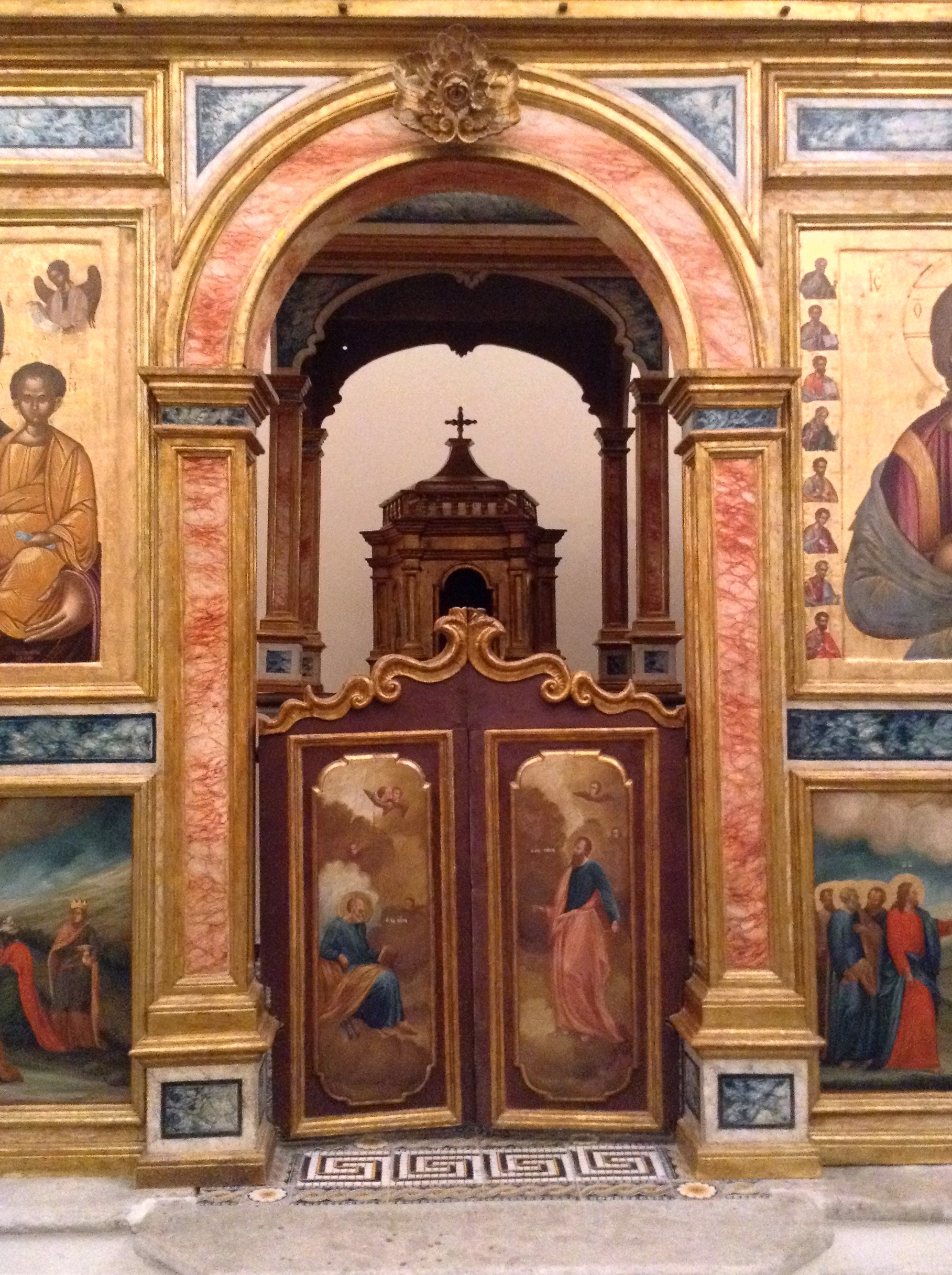
A greek church in Barletta

Since 1500, Barletta has always boasted a large Greek community, with two Orthodox worship: the church of San Giorgio and the church of the Greeks. The Greek cemetery dates back to the mid-1800s.

=== Pyramidal Church ===
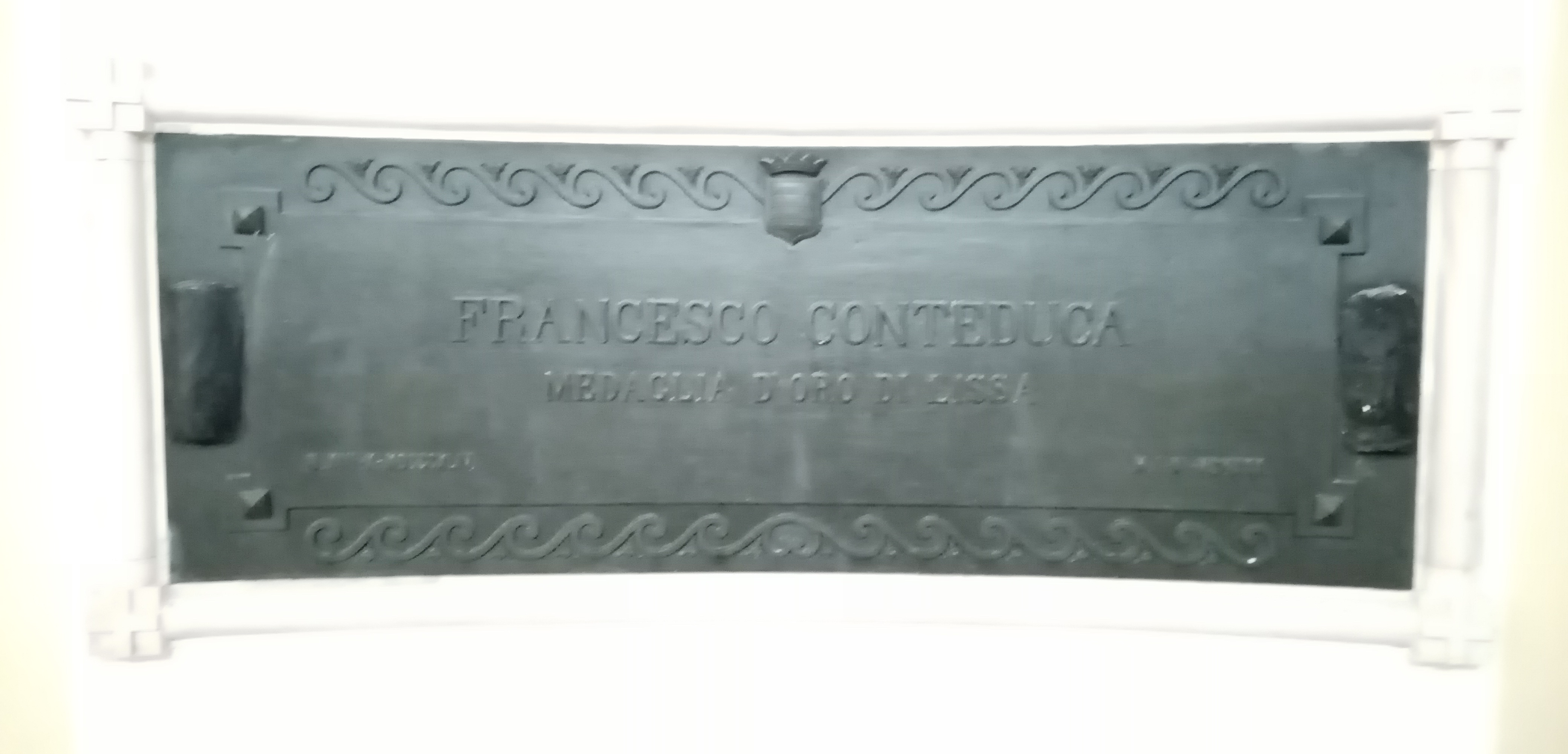
Tomb of Francesco Conteduca in the church

At the beginning the pyramid was supposed to act as an entrance to the cemetery, but the original project was overturned many times. In 1860 it was inaugurated as a cemetery church.

=== Shrine of the Slavs ===
Designed by Dušan Džamonja in 1969, it is one of the four spomeniks of Italy
