= Barletta Cathedral =

Cathedral in Barletta, Apulia, Italy

Barletta Cathedral Cattedrale di Santa Maria Maggiore
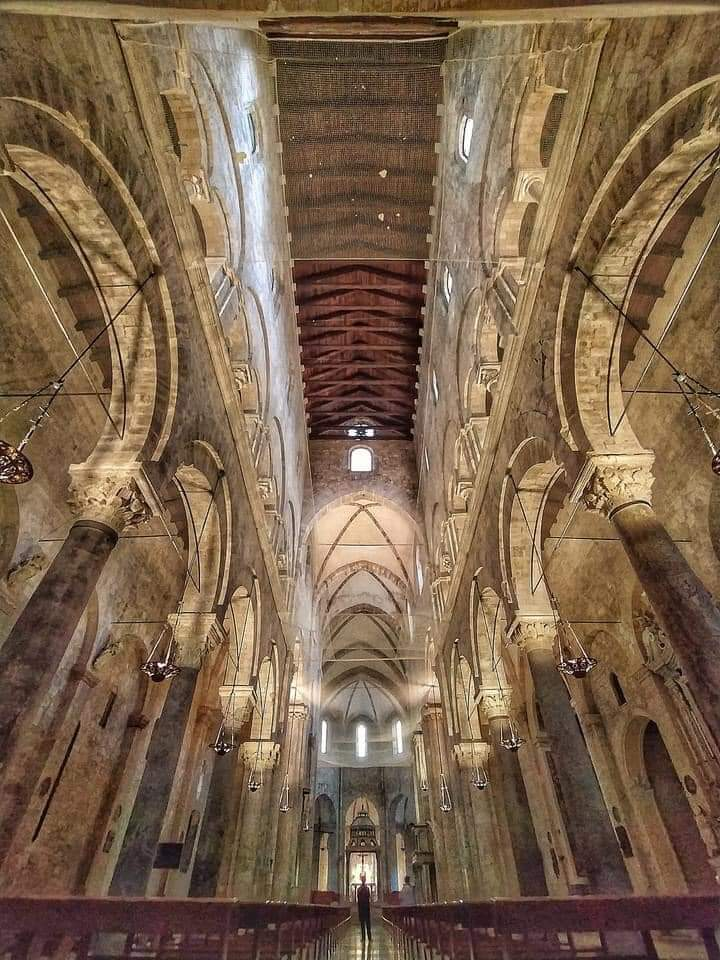
- interiors

Religion
- Affiliation: Roman Catholic
- Diocese: Archdiocese of Trani-Barletta-Bisceglie
- Province: Ecclesiastical province of Trani-Barletta-Bisceglie
- Rite: Roman
- Ecclesiastical or organizational status: Cathedral

Location
- Location: Barletta, Italy
- Interactive map of Barletta Cathedral; Cattedrale di Santa Maria Maggiore
- Coordinates: 41°19′14″N 16°17′10″E

Architecture
- Type: Church
- Style: Romanesque, Gothic
- Groundbreaking: 12th century
- Completed: 14th century
- Materials: Trani stone

The Barletta Cathedral is a Roman Catholic cathedral in the center of Apulia, southern Italy. The current building broke ground in the 12th century of the Common Era.

== History ==
The church occupies the site of ancient hypogeum structures dating from the late 4th-early 3rd centuries BC, attributed to an ancient temple dedicated to Neptune. From the 6th century AD a first palaeo-Christian basilica existed here, having three naves with a central apse, five meters under the current cathedral. After the destruction of the ancient Canosa by Muslim raiders, numerous clerics moved to the Barlettan church, which was renamed as Santa Maria de Auxilio: the 9th century structure had a Latin cross plan, with a pavement mosaic of which traces exist today.

A Romanesque church was built over the pre-existing one in Norman times (12th century), known as Sancta Maria Majoris. Late in the same century the bell tower was also raised, and the capitals of the cyborium were executed by oriental artists. Later the matronei, the mullioned window and the rose window of the western façade were added. The new church was consecrated in 1267. It had a nave and two aisles, divided by two rows each composed of three granite columns and three pillars. In the 13th century two bays and three semicircular apses (similar to those in Trani Cathedral) were also added.

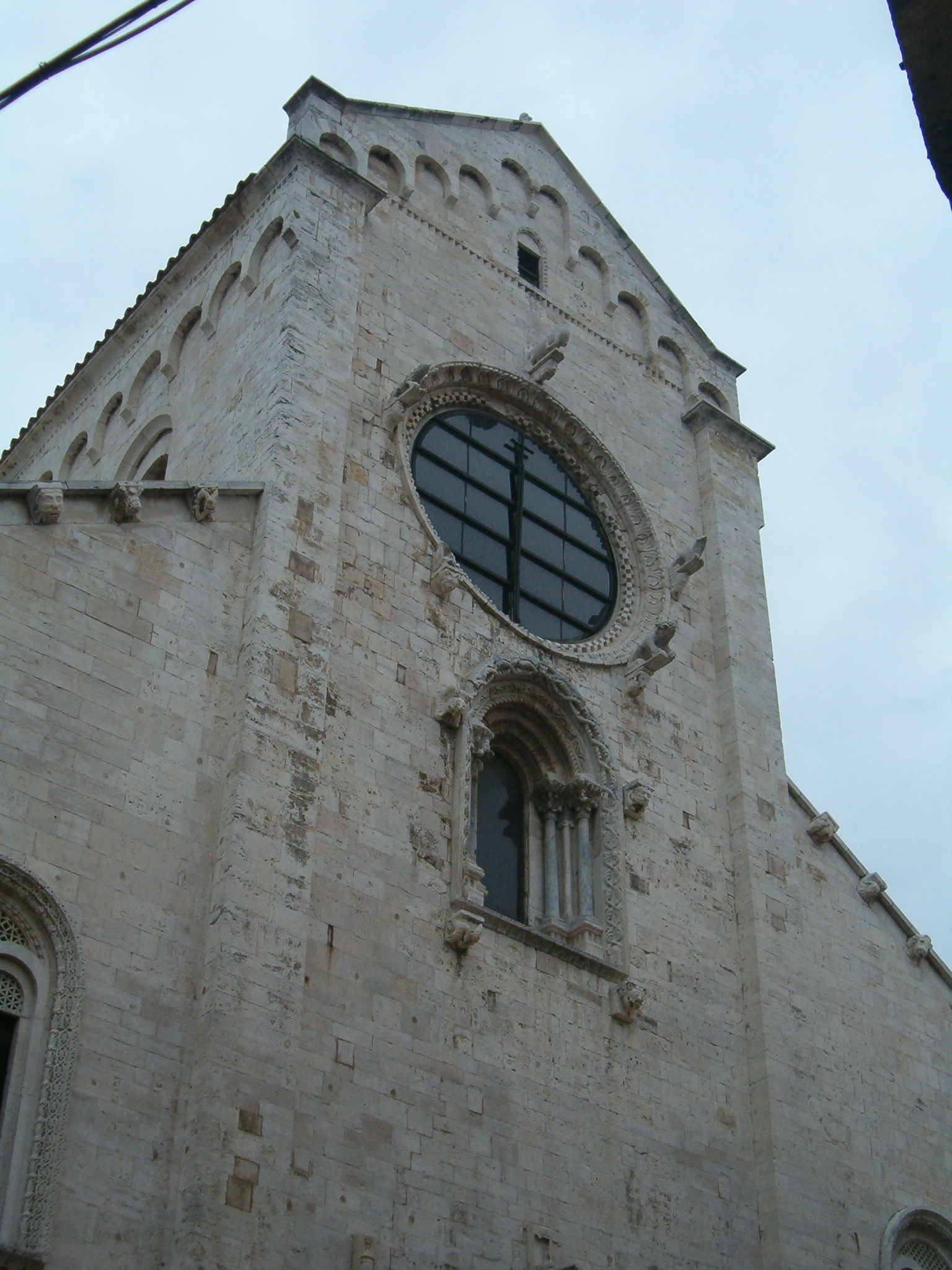
Detail of the main façade.

In the 13th century the Palatine Count Giovanni Pipino da Barletta, a friend of king Charles I of Anjou, promoted a further expansion of the church. The edifice was enlarged eastwards, with a new choir and the removal of the apse and other parts, replaced by new Gothic structures. The renovation ended only in the 16th century.

== Description ==
The church is oriented from east to west, with the Gothic ambulatory oriented eastwards, towards the Castle and the Palazzo Santacroce. The bell tower is located on the northern side, and gives access to the castle through an archway under which are remains of the ancient church's pavement.

The church has a rich medieval decoration including capitals with animals, monsters and other fantastic figures. The main façade had originally three portals: the central one, destroyed in unknown circumstances, was replaced by a Renaissance one. Some bas-reliefs from the original portal are inside the cathedral, portraying scenes of the Last Supper and the entrance of Christ into Jerusalem.

== See also ==
- Church of the Holy Family (Barletta)

== Sources ==
- Bruzelius, Caroline (2005). Le pietre di Napoli. Rome: Viella.
- Cosimo Damiano Fonseca (ed.). Cattedrali di Puglia. Bari: Adda.
