= Giovan Leonardo Primavera =

Italian composer

Giovan Leonardo Primavera (c. 1540–1585) was an Italian Renaissance composer and poet. Born in Barletta, he spent most of his working life in Naples, with some time in other Italian cities such as Venice, Milan, and Loreto.

His works consist primarily of madrigals and three-voice napolitane (secular songs, of a light character, in Neapolitan dialect), based on texts by poets such as Petrarch, Sannazaro, and Tansillo, and a few by himself. His most famous work, the madrigal Nasce la gioja mia, was the model for a parody mass by Palestrina. He was a friend of the composer Carlo Gesualdo, to whom he dedicated his last book of madrigals.

== 'External links ==
- Primavera in the Choral Public Domain Library, including list of published works and scores.
- Recording of Nasce la gioja mia available from Amazon.com
- Scan of Primavera's first and second books of madrigals
