= Du Cann =

Du Cann is a surname. Notable people with the surname include:

- Edward du Cann (1924–2017), British politician and businessman
- John Du Cann (1946–2011), English guitarist
- Richard Du Cann (1929–1994), British barrister

== See also ==
- Cann (surname)
