= Barletta =

Barletta Varrétt / Barlétt (Neapolitan)
- Comune
- Comune di Barletta
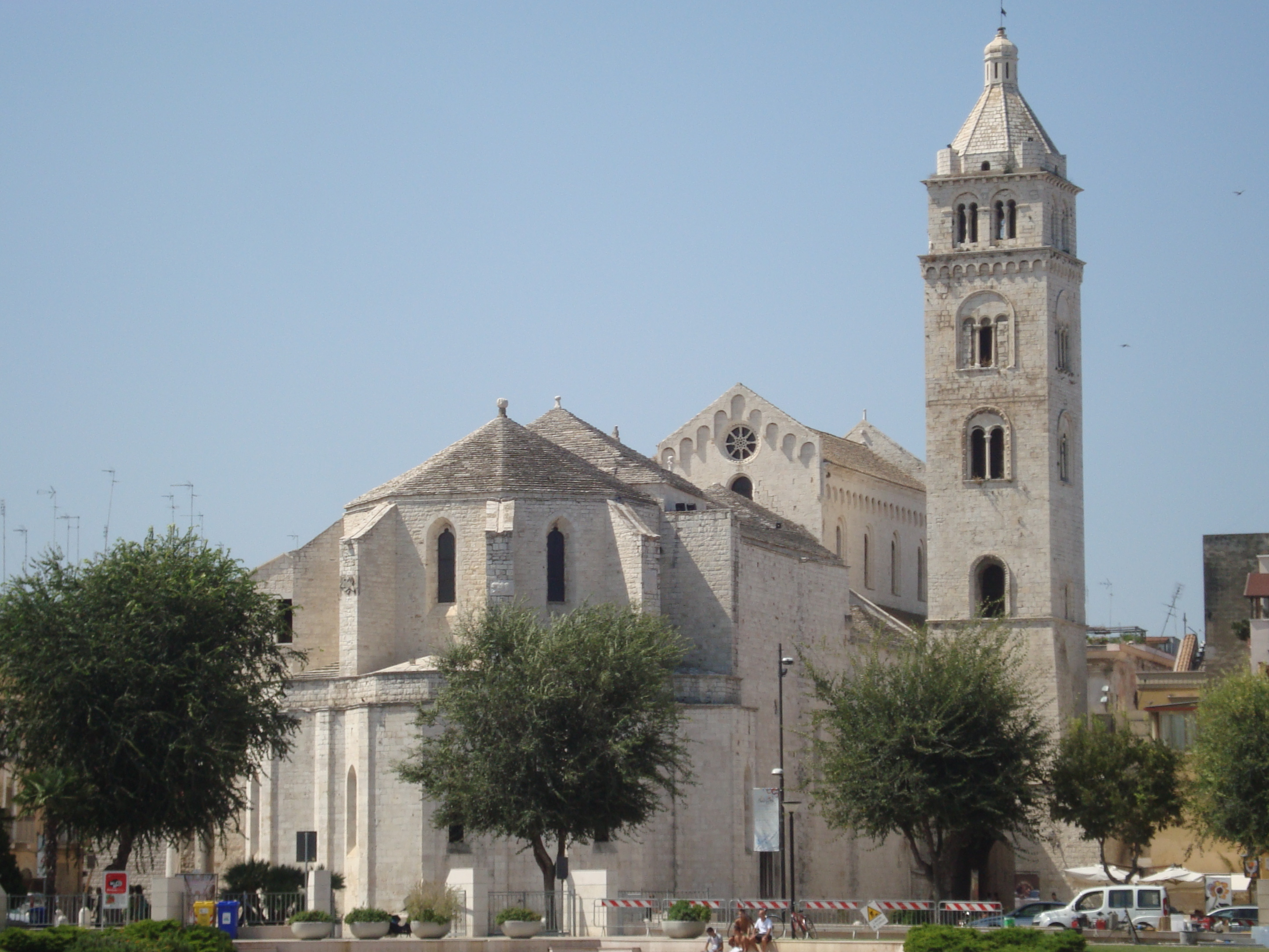
- View of the cathedral.

- Flag Coat of arms

- Location within Italy Location within Apulia
- Coordinates: 41°19′N 16°17′E
- Country: Italy
- Region: Apulia
- Province: Barletta-Andria-Trani (BT)
- Frazioni: Montaltino, Fiumara, Canne della Battaglia

Government
  - Mayor: Cosimo Cannito (Centre-right)

Area
  - Total: 149.35 km^{2} (57.66 sq mi)
- Elevation: 15 m (49 ft)

Population (31 December 2017)
  - Total: 94,477
  - Density: 632.59/km^{2} (1,638.4/sq mi)
- Demonym: Barlettani
- Time zone: UTC+1 (CET)
  - Summer (DST): UTC+2 (CEST)
- Postal code: 76121
- Dialing code: 0883
- Patron saint: St. Roger of Cannae, SS. Madonna dello Sterpeto
- Saint day: December 30
- Website: Official website

Barletta (Italian: [barˈletta]; Central Apulian: Varrétte or Barlétte) is a city and comune (municipality) in Apulia, in southeastern Italy. It has a population of around 94,700. Together with Andria and Trani, it is the seat of the Province of Barletta-Andria-Trani.

The territory of Barletta is located in the natural region of Valle dell'Ofanto. The Ofanto river crosses the countryside and forms the border between Barletta and that Margherita di Savoia. The mouth of the river is in the territory of Barletta.

The area of Barletta also includes part of the ancient city of Cannae, where a historical battle between the Romans and the Carthaginians took place in 216 BC . This is a very important archeological site, remembered for the major battle, won by Hannibal. The archeological site has been recognised as a città d'arte ("city of art") of Apulia in the 2005 for the architectural beauty. Cannae flourished in the Roman period and then after a series of debilitating Saracen attacks, was finally destroyed by the Normans and then abandoned in the early Middle Ages.

Barletta is home to the Colossus of Barletta, a bronze statue, representing a Roman Emperor (perhaps Theodosius II). This statue, called "Eraclio" by the inhabitants of Barletta, is about 4 metres (13 feet) tall, and remains the biggest statue that survives from the late Roman Empire (i.e. the Roman Empire after Constantine). According to a local folk story, Eraclio saved the city from a Saracen attack. Seeing the Saracen ships approaching Barletta's coast, Eraclio waited for them on the sea shore. Here Eraclio acted as if he was crying so the Saracens asked him why he was sad and Eraclio answered that he was sad because he was the smallest among Barletta's inhabitants and so everybody made fun of him. The Saracens thought that Barletta's inhabitants were all giants so left the coast, fearing to face them.

In 1503, Barletta was the location of the eponymous disfida di Barletta ("Joust of Barletta"), a battle during which 13 Italian knights commanded by Ettore Fieramosca challenged and defeated an equal number of French knights who were at the time prisoners of war, in a joust held near Andria. This episode was documented in 1833 by Massimo d'Azeglio, who wrote the novel Ettore Fieramosca o la Disfida di Barletta. In the book the author regards this episode as one of the earliest manifestations of Italian national pride.

The city at the time was fairly loosely besieged by French forces, and occupied by a Spanish army under the command of Gonzalo de Córdoba.

Barletta has one gold medal for military valour and another one for civil valour, for its resistance to an incursion of German Fallschirmjäger who destroyed the port in order to prevent its falling intact into the hands of the advancing British Eighth Army during World War II.

== Geography ==
Barletta is located on the Adriatic coast, where the rocky shore is covered with silt from the Ofanto river. The river forms the boundary of the provinces of Bari and Foggia and has always influenced the agricultural activities of the area. The river also marks the passage from the Murgia to the fertile plain of the Tavoliere, which starts in Barletta.

Barletta is situated on the south-west end of the Gulf of Manfredonia and sits opposite the promontory of Gargano. On its borders are: the Adriatic coast to the north; Trani 12 kilometres (7 mi) to the south-east; Canosa di Puglia 22 kilometres (14 mi) to the south-west; the mouth of the Ofanto river 5 kilometres (3 mi) to the north-west; and the town of Margherita di Savoia 13 kilometres (8 mi) to the west. It is on a low plain that varies from 10 to 15 metres (33 to 49 ft) above sea level. The surface extends over an area of 14,471 hectares (55.87 mi^{2}), and has a length (east to west) of about 6 kilometres (4 mi), a width (north to south) of about 2 kilometres (1.2 mi) and a perimeter of about 13 kilometres (8 mi).

According to the Köppen climate classification, Barletta features a hot-summer Mediterranean climate (Csa), bordering on a humid subtropical climate (Cfa) and cool semi-arid climate (BSk). Close proximity to the Adriatic Sea influences the local climate. Winds are usually from the south. Rainfall is low; Barletta receives 500 millimetres (19.7 in) of rain annually, with most of the rain in autumn and winter during which day-long deluges occur. Rain is minimal between the second half of June and the first half of August.

The comune comprises two parts, Montaltino and Fiumara. The communes next to Barletta are: Andria, Canosa di Puglia, Margherita di Savoia, San Ferdinando di Puglia, Trani, and Trinitapoli.

The city is endowed with a very long, sandy coast stretching to both the east and the west from the commercial port. Along the coast, there are various attractive beaches with trees to the west.

== History ==
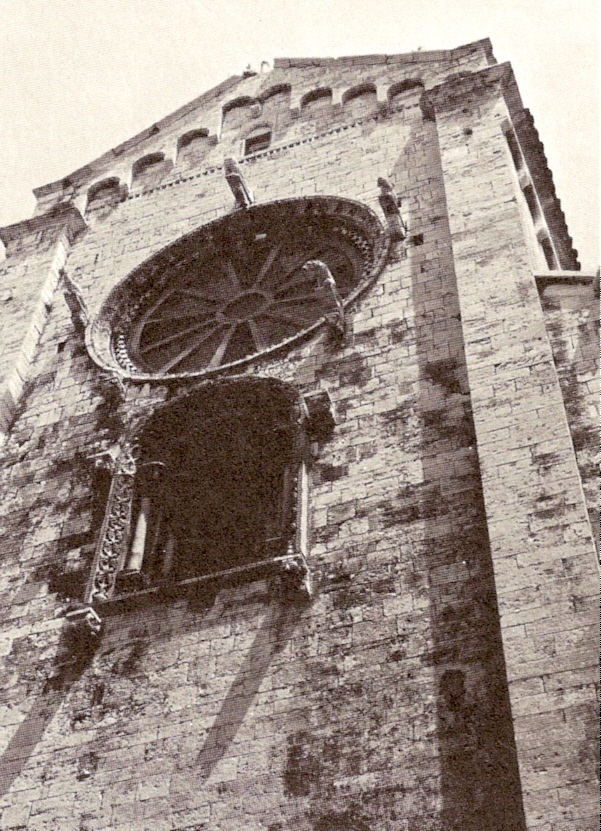
Detail of the façade of the Cathedral of Barletta

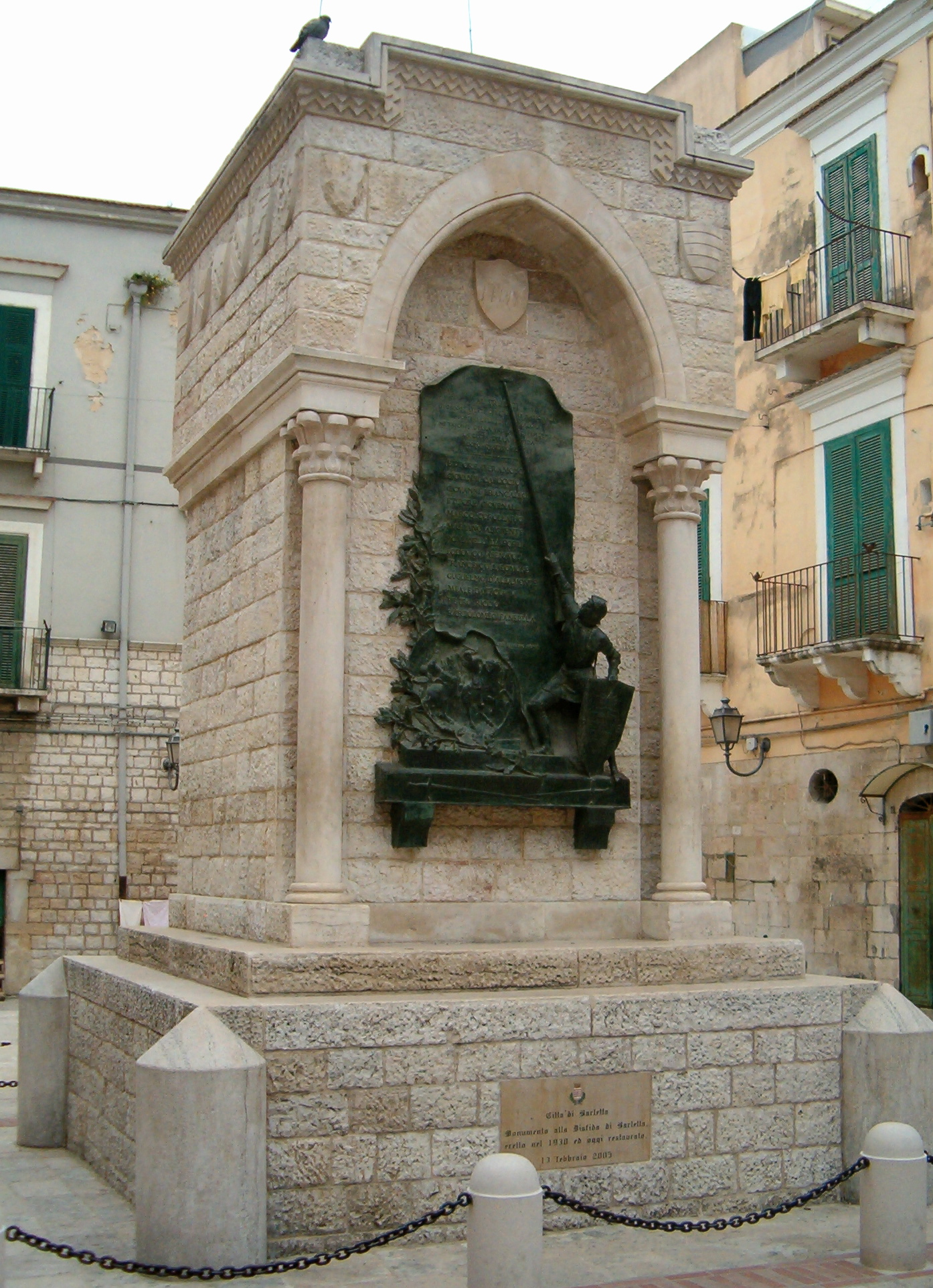
Monument to the Challenge of Barletta

Barletta developed long before the Roman era, known by Greeks and Romans respectively as Bardulos or Barulum.

In the Middle Ages it was a stronghold of the Normans and Lombards, becoming an important staging post for the Crusaders and the Teutonic Knights and Templars as well as the Knights of St.John. Following the Muslim conquest in the Holy Land, the Archbishops of Nazareth took refuge in Barletta (permanently in 1327).

After immigration from the nearby Canne increased its population due to the destruction of Cannae by the Normans, Barletta lived its periods of greatest splendour under King Frederick II and then subsequently the Angevin kings of Naples.

At the beginning of the 16th century, during the guerilla war between the French and the Spanish over possession of Southern Italy, the city was the theater of a historical victory of Italian knights over French prisoners, in what became known as the Challenge of Barletta (13 February 1503). This took place during the occupation of the city by Gonzalo de Cordoba, and served as a handy diversion for his restive siege-bound army. Later the city served as a fortress for the Spanish rulers of southern Italy. In 1528 it was sacked by French troops under Odet de Foix.

The city was the capital of its district and the seat of the lower prefecture for the 120 years between 1806 and 1927 and sided with the French under Joachim Murat during the Napoleonic War.

During and after the Unification, Barletta was as poor as was most of the South of Italy. Consequently, hygiene and health were particularly bad. Various types of disease plagued the population, such as tuberculosis, diarrhea, pneumonia, small pox, malaria, etc. An estimated 15% of the population was affected by trachoma. The most dreaded of the diseases brought by poverty was cholera. Outbreaks of cholera took place in the city in 1836, 1854, 1865, 1866, 1867, 1886 and finally 1910 when the bacillus was brought back to Barletta by Barlettan fishermen, and killed tens of thousands all over southern Italy. Barletta also has a religious dark side to it when the very last Protestants to be burned alive at the stake took place in 1866. "The Papists came out of Santo Sepolcro, in their rampage to martyr Protestants as they screamed, "Death to the Protestants!'" (London Times, 9 April 1866) A 100 year anniversary plaque to the five Protestant martyrs can be seen at the Evangelical Baptist Church (Italian, "Chiesa Evangelica Battista") of Barletta.

During World War I a minor naval battle took place off Barletta and the Italian Nembo-class destroyer Turbine was sunk by the Austro-Hungarian light cruiser Helgoland and destroyers Csepel, Tátra and Lika on 24 May 1915.

During World War II, the city was the site of the first episode of Italian conflict with German troops, when a battalion of Fallschirmjäger (parachutists) was sent from Foggia to Barletta to destroy the port before the British 8th Army could arrive, the Italian garrison surrendered after a brief struggle, thereby earning the Gold Medal of Military Valour and of Civilian Merit.

After the war it was the site of a DP camp.

The city hosts Monumental Cemetery of Barletta.

== Main sights ==
The principal monuments of the city are:

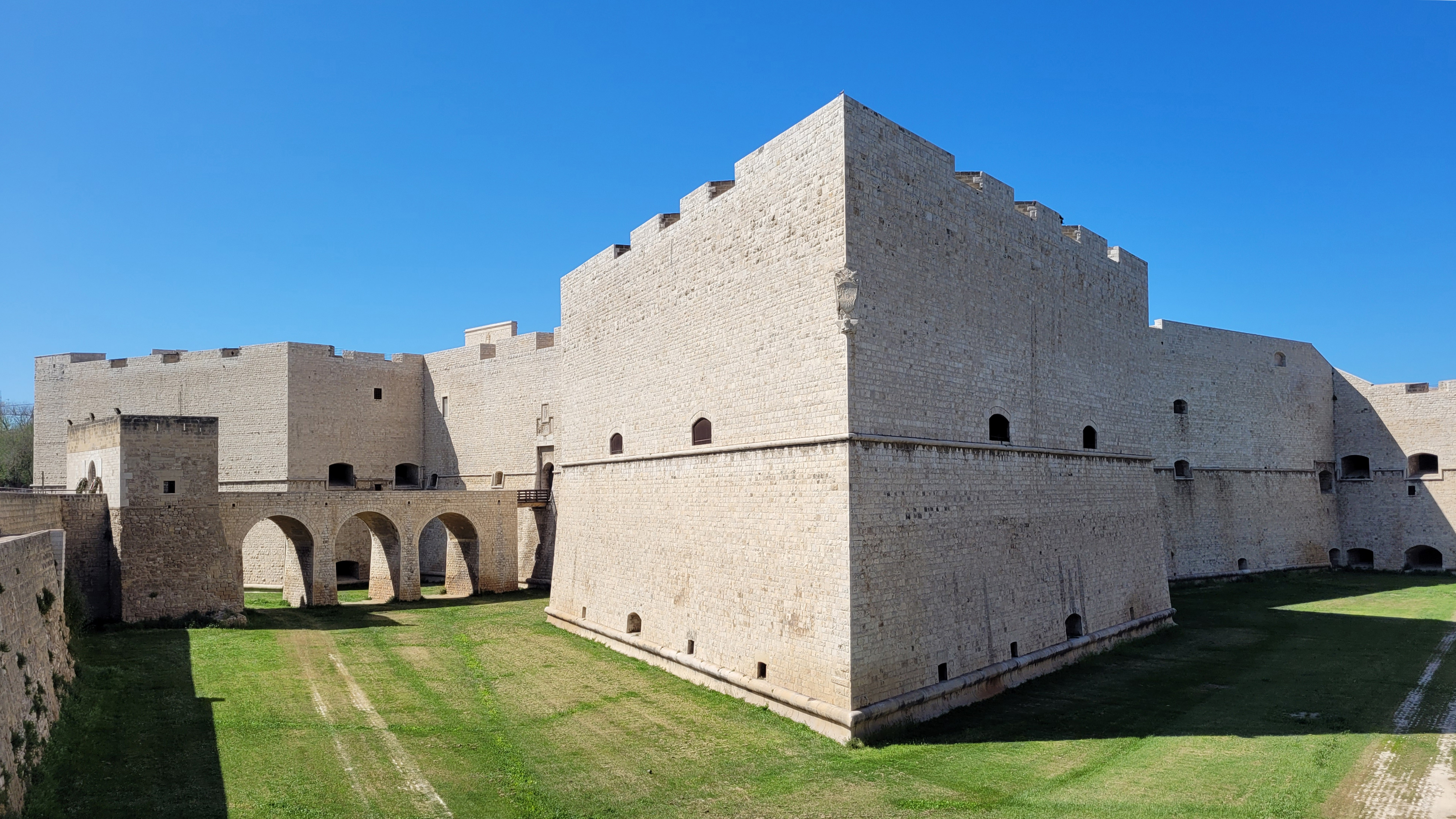
View of the castle

- The Castle, a structure initially erected in the 10th century by the Normans as a typical motte and bailey structure. During the Crusade period, it was a used as a hostel for soldiers leaving for the Holy Land. It was upgraded and enlarged substantially under the reign of Frederick II between 1225 and 1228. This corresponds to the period in which he launched a crusade from here, the Sixth Crusade. The castle was later expanded under the House of Anjou, when Barletta became an important centre of Aragonese-Spanish control in the area, in 1527. Charles had the building expanded again and the four massive bastions added to create the present fortress form. In 1915 the fortress, then in use as a barracks and military store, was bombarded by the Austro-Hungarian scout cruiser SMS Helgoland. In September 1943 it was the setting of an Italian military defence unit against a German army.

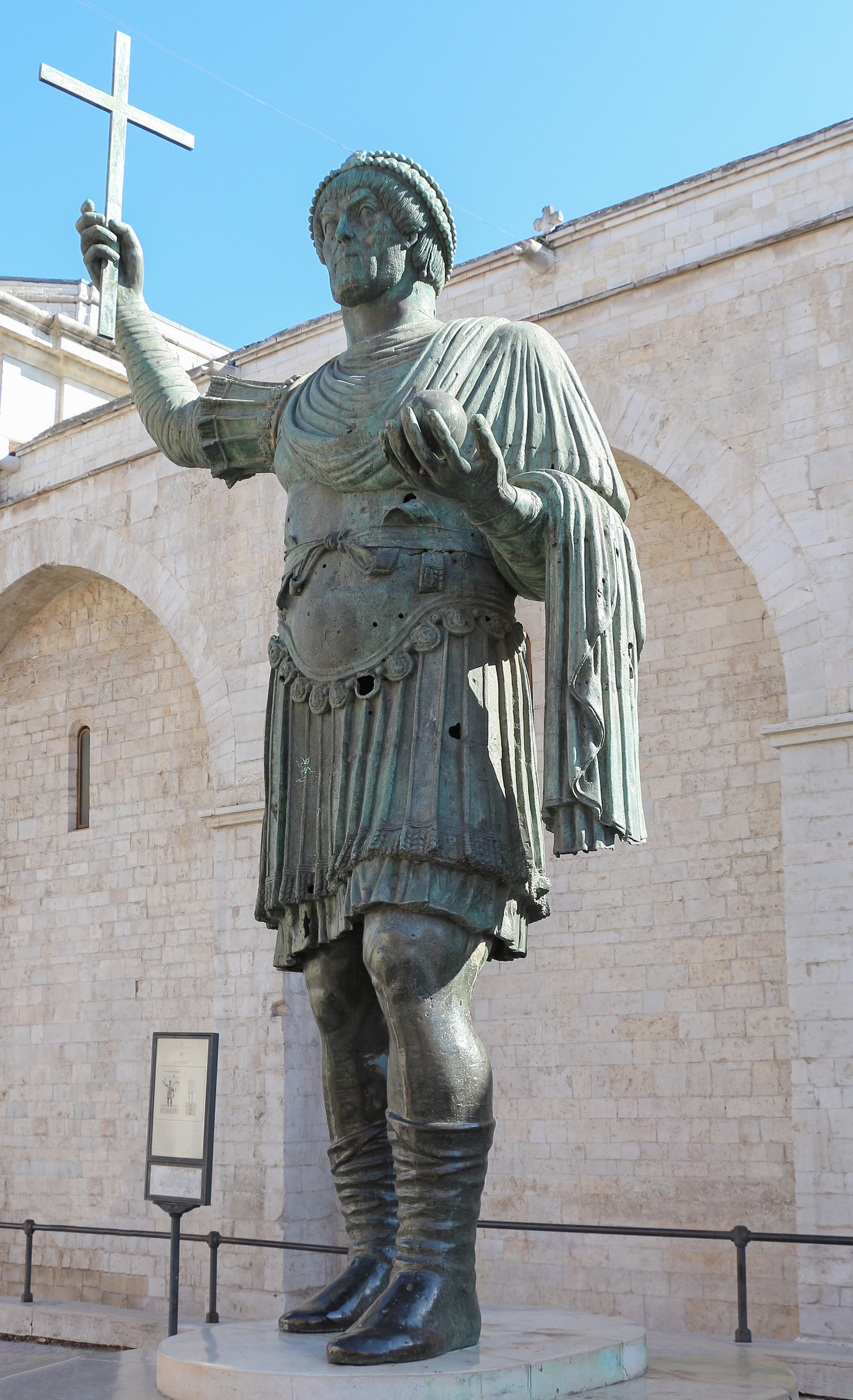
Colossus of Barletta, late 5th century

- Colossus of Barletta: a large bronze statue of a Roman Emperor.
- Basilica of the Holy Sepulchre (Basilica of San Sepolcro): adjacent to Colossus, this church was built in the 12th century and the former headquarters outside the city walls of the Knights of Malta, it stood next to a hospital for pilgrims (now demolished) to the Holy Land during the medieval period, a Romanesque church with particular Oriental influences from Jerusalem. The façade represents the Baroque style.
- Cathedral of Santa Maria Maggiore: erected on the former site of the temple of Neptune, is an example of the fusion of Gothic and Roman styles. In its interior, at a lower level, are grotticella tombs from the 3rd century BC, over which is the Palaeo-Christian basilica (6th century AD) with another basilica being added to that in the 9th century. In the 12th century a new building was erected in Romanesque style, being consecrated in 1267; this was renovated in the Gothic style in the 14th century
- San Giacomo: 11th-century church named after St James the Great ('Matamoros' or Saracen-slayer), was erected on the site of what had been the temple of Isis in Roman times. Toppled by the earthquake that nearly razed Barletta, it was soon rebuilt and re-consecrated in 1751.
- The Cellar of the Challenge, a former prison for galley slaves.
- Palace of the Marra: Baroque palace outside Salento, now housing the Pinacoteca Giuseppe De Nittis.
- Canne della Battaglia: archeologic site, location of the Battle of Cannae.

== Population ==
Historical population

Year	Pop.	±%
1861	27,304	—
1871	28,638	+4.9%
1881	33,594	+17.3%
1901	41,969	+24.9%
1911	44,233	+5.4%
1921	51,387	+16.2%
1931	48,038	−6.5%
1936	52,386	+9.1%

Year	Pop.	±%
1951	64,282	+22.7%
1961	68,035	+5.8%
1971	75,728	+11.3%
1981	83,453	+10.2%
1991	89,527	+7.3%
2001	92,094	+2.9%
2011	94,239	+2.3%
2021	92,799	−1.5%

Source: ISTAT

== Economy ==
Barletta is a city whose economy is based on the manufacture of concrete and cement. To a lesser degree, it is also a city of agriculture, of which grapes and olives form the most widespread crops.

== Transportation ==
Barletta railway station is reachable by train from the FS Adriatic Railway main line (Trenitalia company), from the Bari–Barletta railway (Ferrovie del Nord Barese), and from the Barletta–Spinazzola railway (Trenitalia). The FNB also has a second station in the city.

By car, Barletta is reachable from the A14 motorway (exiting at Andria-Barletta or Canosa) or the SS16 highway or from the airport of Bari-Palese, located about 55 kilometres (34 mi) from Barletta.

Other than Barletta's commercial port, with the Barletta Lighthouse. There are no sea connections, though Bari and other cities have ferry services across the Adriatic.

There is no airport in the city. The nearest airport is Bari Airport, located 50 km (31 mi) east of Barletta.

=== Twin towns – sister cities ===
Barletta is twinned with:

- Herceg Novi, Montenegro

== Notable people ==
- Anthony Albanese 31st Prime Minister of Australia
- Elisabetta Barbato (1921–2014), operatic soprano
- Roger of Cannae (1060–1121), saint, bishop of Cannae and patroon of Barletta
- Gabriel Barletta (15th century), Dominican preacher
- Ettore Fieramosca (1476–1515), head of the Italian knights participating in the famous Joust of Barletta in 1503
- Mariano Santo (1488–1577), surgeon
- Giovan Leonardo Primavera (c. 1540–1585), composer and poet
- Carlo Cafiero (1846–1892), anarchist and supporter of Mikhail Bakunin
- Giuseppe De Nittis (1846–84), impressionist painter
- Mario Gallo (1878–1945) influential director in the Cinema of Argentina
- Carlo Maria Giulini (1914–2005), orchestra director
- Francesco Monterisi (1934–), cardinal
- Pietro Mennea (1952–2013), former world-record holder in the 200 m sprint and gold medalist at the 1980 Olympics
- Gennaro Delvecchio (1978–), national footballer for Italy
- Francesco Lotoro (1964–), composer and Holocaust music archivist

== See also ==
- Castle of Barletta
- Church of the Holy Family (Barletta)
