= Sir Robert Cann, 1st Baronet =

English politician

- Born: Robert Cann c. 1621
- Died: 1685St Werburgh's Church, Bristol
- Citizenship: English
- Occupation: Member of Parliament
- Years active: 11 February 1678, March 1679, and October 1679 – 28 October 1680
- Known for: Member (MP) of the Parliament of England for Bristol

Sir Robert Cann, 1st Baronet (c. 1621–1685), of Small Street, Bristol and Stoke Bishop, Westbury-on-Trym, Gloucestershire, was an English politician.

He was the son of William Cann, merchant of Bristol and Margaret, the sister of Robert Yeamans. He followed his father into trade, becoming a member of the Merchant Venturers of Bristol in 1646.

He was Mayor of Bristol in 1662–3, when Charles II visited the city. He was knighted in April 1662 and created a baronet in September. By 1669 he had built Stoke House on land he had acquired at Stoke Bishop, which has been interpreted as a means of establishing his family within the landed gentry. However, his Bristol house remained his main residence.

He entered parliament as Member MP for Bristol February 1678, following the death of his first wife's nephew Humphrey Hooke, apparently without opposition. He was a moderately active member and considered at this stage as 'worthy' by Shaftesbury. He was re-elected in March 1679, but his failure to support Exclusion led to opposition from its supporters in Bristol. His subsequent re-election in October 1679 was disputed and eventually declared void, leading to his expulsion from the House of Commons on 28 October 1680.

Cann campaigned for a law against kidnapping of white children for plantation work, but was himself fined in 1685 for taking criminals from Bristol to work on Bristol-owned Caribbean plantations.

== Family ==
He married firstly Cecily, daughter of Humphrey Hooke, alderman of Bristol in 1642. They had 2 children:

- Sir William Cann, 2nd Baronet (died 1698)
- Anne married 1) Sir Robert Gunning of Cold Ashton and 2) Sir Dudley North

In 1647 he married his second wife Anne, daughter of Derrick Popley, merchant of the Red Lodge, Bristol. Their son Thomas served as High Sheriff of Gloucestershire in 1687 and was knighted by James II.

He died in November 1685 and was buried at St Werburgh's, Bristol.

Baronetage of England
New creation	Baronet (of Compton Green); 1662–1685	Succeeded by William Cann
