= Canne (Cosson) =

River in Centre-Val de Loire, France

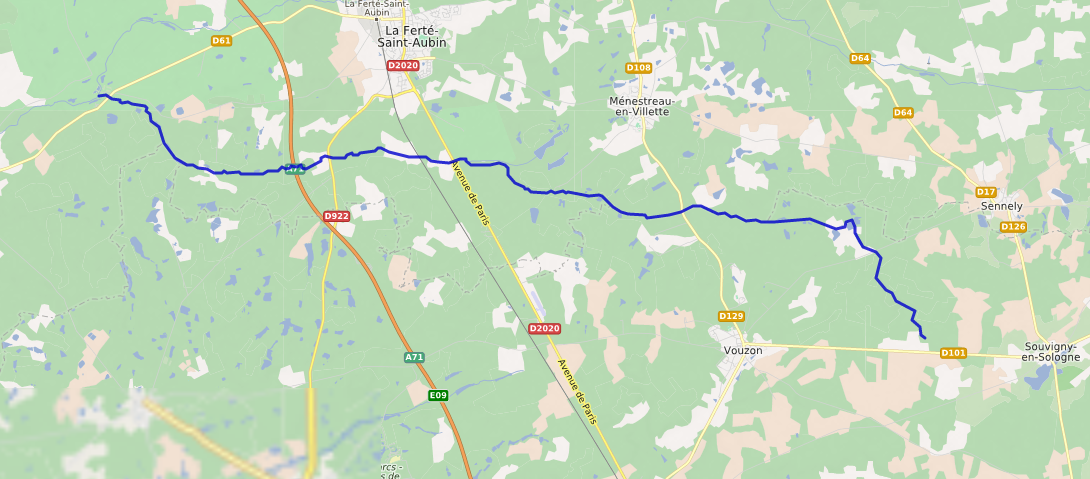
- Map of the Canne

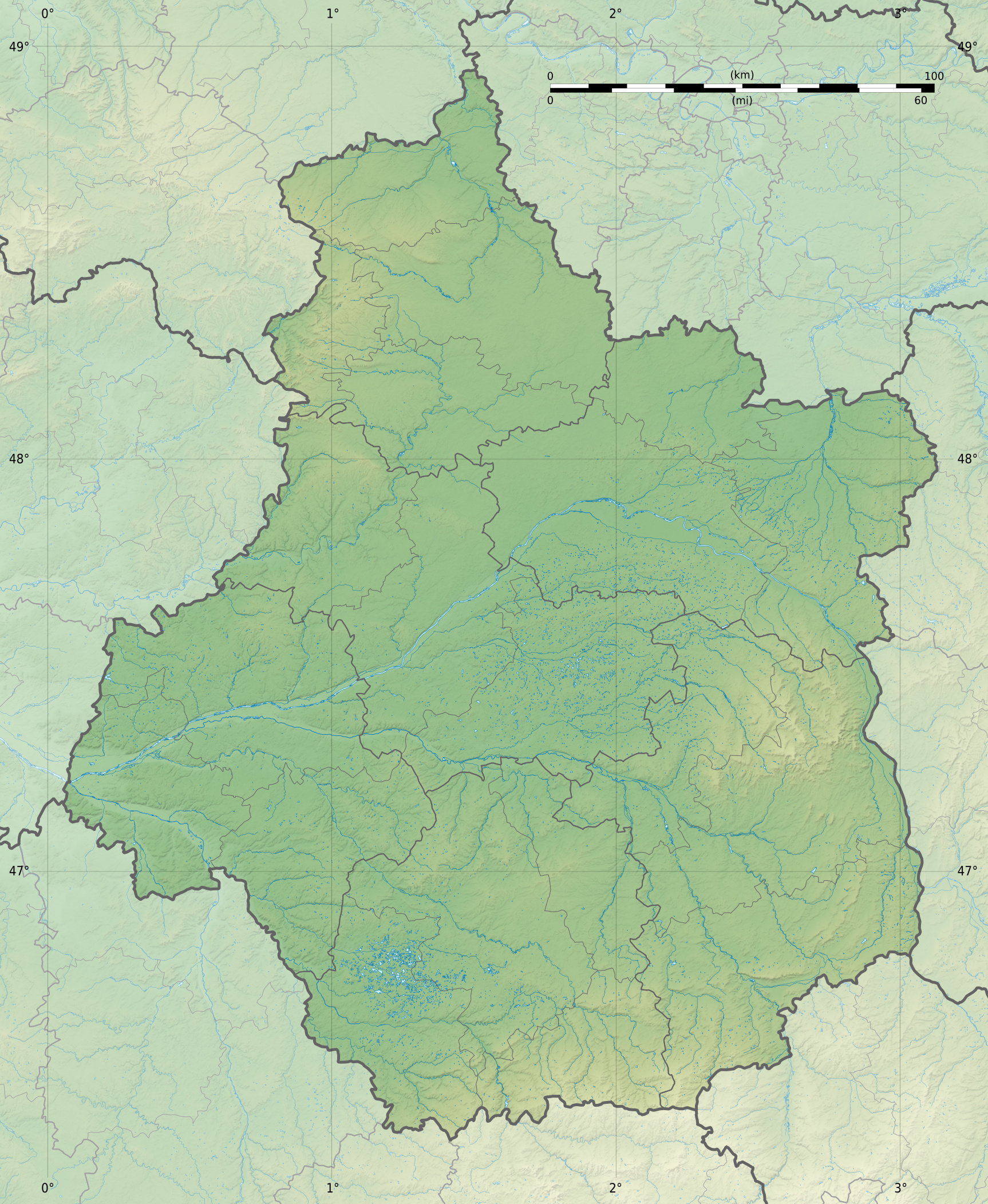

Location
- Country: France

Physical characteristics
- Source
  - location: Vouzon
  - coordinates: 47°39′00″N 02°07′07″E
  - elevation: 64 m (210 ft)

The Canne is a French river which flows in the departments of Loir-et-Cher and Loiret, in the Centre-Val de Loire region. It is a tributary of the Cosson on the left bank, therefore a sub-tributary of the Loire.

== Geography ==
According to the Sandre, the Canne has its source in the commune of Vouzon, at an altitude of 144 meters, northeast of the place called Misabran.

It successively forms two ponds (Grand Cansle and Petit Cansle) before passing under the departmental road (RD) 125. It bypasses the Château de la Grillère, supplying its moats with water. It serves as a municipal and departmental boundary for more than four kilometers between Ménestreau-en-Villette and Vouzon, passing under the RD 108/RD 129 and receiving the Blanchin stream on the left bank then the Fausse Canne on the right bank. It is then enlarged on the left bank by the Couapellières stream then on the right bank by the Juré ditch. It passes under the RD 2020 then near the Château du Ruth. It receives the Chaselle (or Chazelle) on the left bank and passes under the Paris-Toulouse railway line. It is crossed by the RD 922, receives on the left bank its main tributary, the Ardillères stream, then passes under the A71 motorway. It serves as a boundary for 600 meters between La Ferté-Saint-Aubin and Yvoy-le-Marron. Over the last kilometer and a half of its course, it marks the limit between La Ferté-Saint-Aubin and Ligny-le-Ribault, passing under the RD 61.

It flows into the Cosson, on the edge of these last two communes, at an altitude of 92 meters, north of the Château de la Frogerie.

Flowing generally from east to west, the Cane is 26.39 kilometers long. It thus has a hydraulic slope of 1.9 mm/m.

=== Departments and municipalities crossed ===
The Canne waters five municipalities in two departments: in Loir-et-Cher: Vouzon (source) and Yvoy-le-Marron and in Loiret: Ménestreau-en-Villette, La Ferté-Saint-Aubin (confluence) and Ligny-le-Ribault (confluence).

The Canne has, according to the Sandre, twenty-nine tributaries listed. Nine of them reach or exceed a length of three kilometers. Six of them have names:

- the 7.2 km long Ardillères stream on the left bank,
- la Chaselle, or Chazelle, 5.75 km long on the left bank,
- the 4.32 km long Juré ditch on the right bank, the Couapellières stream, 3.49 km long, on the left bank,
- the Blanchin stream, 3.23 km long, on the left bank, the 3 km long False Canne on the right bank.

Three other are not named :

- K4758000 3.88 km long on the left bank, K4754900 3.47 km long on the left bank,
- K4746500 3.19 km long on the right bank.

Two of its tributaries, the Ardillères stream and the Juré ditch, having at least one sub-tributary, the Strahler number of the Canne is four.
