= Francesco Lotoro =

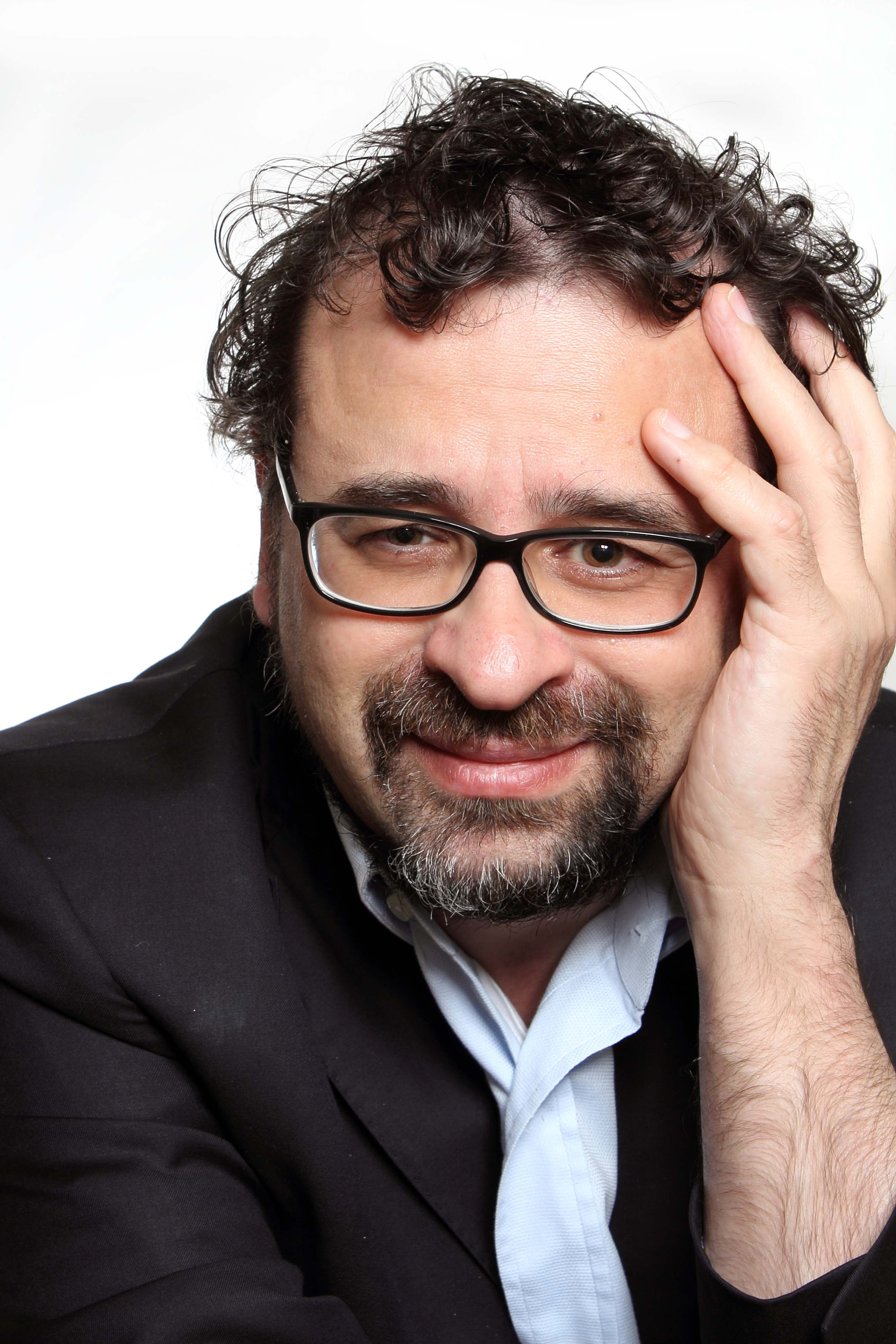

Background information
- Born: 1964 (age 61–62); Barletta, Italy
- Occupations: Pianist, composer and musicologist
- Instrument: Piano
- Website: en.fondazioneilmc.it

Francesco Lotoro (born 1964) is an Italian pianist, composer and musicologist.

== Early career ==
After graduating in piano at the Niccolò Piccinni Conservatory of Bari, Francesco Lotoro continued his piano studies with Kornél Zempléni and László Almásy at the Franz Liszt Academy of Music in Budapest, and became a piano player studying also with Viktor Merzhanov, Tamás Vásáry and Aldo Ciccolini. His activity focused on Johann Sebastian Bach: he transcribed The Musical Offering for two pianos, the Brandenburg Concertos, the Deutsche Messe and the Canons on the Goldberg ground, BWV 1087. He also reconstructed, performed and recorded the Christmas Oratorio for soloists, choir and piano by Friedrich Nietzsche.

== Major work ==
In 1995, Lotoro founded the Orchestra Musica Judaica.

In the 1990s, he conceived the project of collecting the musical literature produced by musicians in captivity during the Holocaust, starting with the collection and recording of all the piano and chamber music works written by Alois Piňos, Petr Pokorný, Petr Eben and others after the Prague Spring, and above all by recording works for the music Encyclopedia in 48 CD-volumes titled KZ Musik. KZ Musik which consists of the recording of the musical corpus created in places of captivity, deportation and deprivation of human rights from the opening of the Dachau and Börgermoor camps until liberation at the end of the Second World War and on the Eurasian (May 1945) and the Pacific (August 1945) sides.

In this collection he recorded Symphony No. 8 by Erwin Schulhoff for piano (written in the Wülzburg Internment Camp), the piano score of Don Quixote tanzt Fandango by Viktor Ullmann and of Nonet by Rudolf Karel (written in the Pankrác prison, Prague).

As a composer he created the opera Misha e i lupi and the Suite "Golà" for singer and chamber orchestra. He is the author of the volumes Fonte di ogni bene: canti di risveglio ebraico composti dal 1930 al 1945 a Sannicandro Garganico (Rotas, 2009), Renato Virgilio. Vita e opere di un musicista (ed. Rotas, 2010), Alla ricerca della musica perduta. Prolegomeni a una letteratura musicale concentrazionaria (Rotas, 2012) and Antologia musicale concentrazionaria: opere musicali scritte in cattività civile e militare durante la Seconda guerra mondiale (Rotas, 2015). Conductor Paolo Candido collaborated with him on the first and second book.

== Institute of Concentrationary Music Literature ==
In 2014, with his wife Grazia Tiritiello and other partners, Lotoro established the Foundation Institute of Concentrationary Music Literature based in Barletta, a non-profit organization that takes care of the archive of music scores written in concentration camps. The archive includes 8,000 music scores, 12,000 audiovisual and paper documents and 3,000 non-fiction books. The Foundation, of which Lotoro is president, promotes also the Citadel of Concentrationary Music, the world's biggest hub dedicated to the concentrationary music to be built in the same city, near an ancient and disused distillery.

Francesco Lotoro and the concentrationary music are the subject of two international publishing initiatives: the book Le Maestro: À la recherche de la musique des camps (1933-1945) (Éditions Stock, 2012) by French writer Thomas Saintourens and the documentary Maestro by the Franco-Argentine director Alexandre Valenti, an Italian-French co-production of 2017 screened in cinemas all over the world and aired on major international TV channels.

In December 2019, Lotoro's work was the subject of a 60 minutes story.

== Private life ==
He married Grazia Tiritiello, his main collaborator; they have no children. Francesco and Grazia converted to Judaism in 2004.

== Recognition ==
In November 2013, Francesco Lotoro was awarded the title of Chevalier de l'Ordre des Arts et des Lettres by the French Ministry of Culture, because - the motivation says - "he dedicated considerable efforts to search scores of French composers deported to the lagers, thus saving their music ", bringing to completion a "simply exceptional" work.

In December 2014 he was awarded the title of Knight Order of Merit of the Italian Republic, conferred by President Sergio Mattarella.

== Discography ==
- F. Busoni, F. Nietzsche, B. Pasternak, F. G. Lorca. Sorriso
- Shoah; R. Karel, P. Haas, G. Klein, V. Ullmann. Sorriso
- F. Nietzsche; Christmas Oratorium (Lotoro, RSI). Sorriso
- Brundibár; H. Krása, G. Klein, V. Ullmann. Sorriso
- F. Nietzsche; Christmas Oratorium (Lotoro, Ars Cantica). Sarx
- J.S. Bach; A Musical Offering, (Lotoro, Greco). Symposion
- Praha '68; Piňos, Pokorný, Eben, Ištvan, Knizak. Symposion
- J.S. Bach; A German Mass (Lotoro, Ciccolini). Symposion
- Musica Judaica (2 CDs). Symposion
- KZ MUSIK, 48 CD-volumes (Lotoro&others). Musikstrasse-Membran
- "Musiciens martyrs de l'holocauste" : Rudolf Karel, Pavel Haas, Gideon Klein, Victor Ullmann. Arion (ARN 68339).

== Publications ==
- F. Nietzsche; Christmas Oratorio (reconstruction of music and lyrics)
- J.S. Bach; A Musical Offering e Erbarme dich (transcription for two pianos)
- J.S. Bach; A German Mass e 14 Canoni (transcription for two pianos)
- P. Eben; Svatý Václave (transcription for two pianos)
- Dizionario della Letteratura Musicale Concentrazionaria
- Fonte di ogni bene: canti di risveglio ebraico composti dal 1930 al 1945 a Sannicandro Garganico (Rotas, 2009)
- Renato Virgilio. Vita e opere di un musicista (ed. Rotas, 2010)
- Alla ricerca della musica perduta. Prolegomeni a una letteratura musicale concentrazionaria (Rotas, 2012)
- Antologia musicale concentrazionaria: opere musicali scritte in cattività civile e militare durante la Seconda guerra mondiale (Rotas, 2015)
