= McCann =

McCann may refer to:

- McCann (surname)
- McCann (company), advertising agency
- McCann Worldgroup, network of marketing and advertising agencies
- Marist College athletic facilities
  - McCann Arena
  - James J. McCann Baseball Field
- McCann Rescue Chamber
- Disappearance of Madeleine McCann
