= Cannae =

Town in south east Italy

Coordinates: 41°17′47″N 16°09′06″E

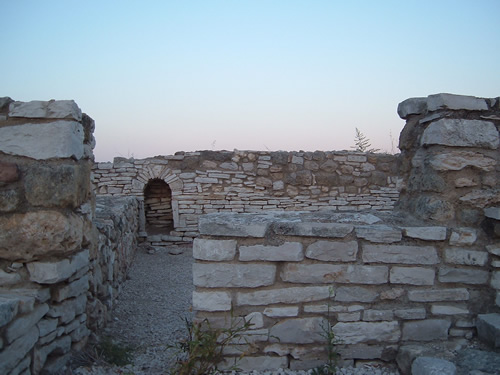
Remains of Cannae.

Cannae (now Canne della Battaglia, Italian pronunciation: [ˈkanne della batˈtaʎʎa]) is an ancient village of the Apulia region of south east Italy. It is a frazione (civil parish) of the comune (municipality) of Barletta. Cannae was formerly a bishopric, and is a Latin Catholic titular see (as of 2022).

== Geography ==
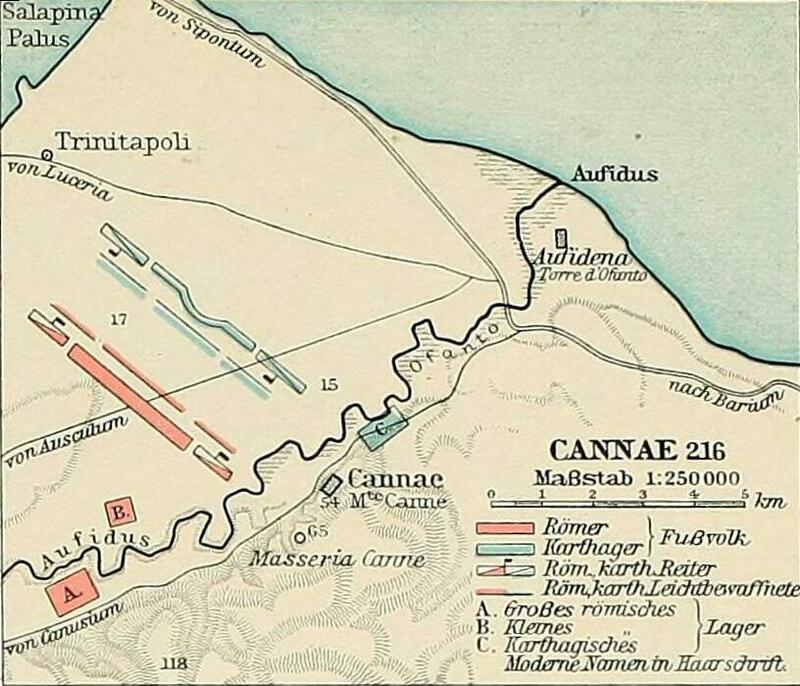
Map of Cannae in antiquity

The commune of Cannae is situated near the river Ofanto (ancient names Aufidus or Canna), on a hill on the right (i.e., south) bank, 9.6 kilometres (6 miles) southwest of its mouth, and 9 km southwest of Barletta.

== History ==
It is primarily known for the Battle of Cannae, in which the numerically superior Roman army suffered a disastrous defeat by Hannibal in 216 BC. There is considerable controversy as to whether the battle took place on the right or the left bank of the river.

Later, the place became a municipium, and the remains of an unimportant Roman town still exist upon the hill known as Monte di Canne. In the Middle Ages, probably after the destruction of Canosa di Puglia in the 9th century, it became a bishopric. It again saw military action in the second battle of Cannae, twelve centuries after the more famous one (1018). The Byzantine catapan, Basilios Bojoannes, successfully drove off the invading Lombard and Norman army. The town was wrecked in 1083 by Robert Guiscard, who left only the cathedral and the bishop's residence, and was ultimately destroyed in 1276.

== See also ==
- Battle of Cannae (216 BC)
- Battle of Cannae (1018)
- Battle of Montemaggiore
- List of Catholic dioceses in Italy

== Bibliography ==
- Berry, Small, Talbert, Elliott, Gillies, Becker, 'Cannae' in Pleiades Gazetteer: http://pleiades.stoa.org/places/442523
- Cappelletti, Giuseppe (1870). Le chiese d'Italia dalla loro origine sino ai nostri giorni (in Italian). Vol. vigesimoprimo (21). Venezia: Antonelli. pp. 66–69.
- Eubel, Conradus, ed. (1914). Hierarchia catholica (in Latin). Vol. 2 (2nd ed.). Münster: Libreria Regensbergiana. p. 117.
- Gams, Pius Bonifacius Series episcoporum Ecclesiae Catholicae, reprint: Leipzig 1931, pp. 865–866.
- Eubel, Conradus, ed. (1913). Hierarchia catholica (in Latin). Vol. 1 (2nd ed.). Münster: Libreria Regensbergiana. p. 162.
- Hammond, N.G.L. & Scullard, H.H. (Eds.) (1970). The Oxford Classical Dictionary. Oxford: Oxford University Press. ISBN 0-19-869117-3. p. 201.
- Pius VII (1818), "De utiliori," in: Bullarii romani continuatio, Vol. XV, Rome 1853, pp. 56–61.

=== External links ===
- GCatholic – data on former and titular bishopric
