= Cann baronets =

Extinct baronetcy in the Baronetage of England

The Cann Baronetcy, of Compton Green in the County of Gloucester, was a title in the Baronetage of England. It was created on 13 September 1662 for Robert Cann, Mayor of Bristol and subsequently MP for Bristol. The fourth Baronet was High Sheriff of Gloucestershire from 1726 to 1727. The title became extinct on the death of the sixth Baronet in 1765.

William Cann, father of the first Baronet, was Mayor of Bristol in 1648.

== Cann baronets, of Compton Green (1662) ==
- Sir Robert Cann, 1st Baronet (c. 1621–1685)
- Sir William Cann, 2nd Baronet (died 1698)
- Sir William Cann, 3rd Baronet (c. 1694–1726)
- Sir Robert Cann, 4th Baronet (died 1748)
- Sir William Cann, 5th Baronet (c. 1689–1753)
- Sir Robert Cann, 6th Baronet (by 1741–1765)
