= List of municipalities of the Province of Foggia =

The following is a list of the 61 municipalities (comuni) of the Province of Foggia in the region of Apulia in Italy.

== List ==
Municipality	Population (2026)	Area (km²)	Density
Accadia	2,204	30.74	71.7
Alberona	836	49.75	16.8
Anzano di Puglia	1,055	11.02	95.7
Apricena	12,486	172.51	72.4
Ascoli Satriano	5,634	336.68	16.7
Biccari	2,579	106.65	24.2
Bovino	2,862	84.93	33.7
Cagnano Varano	6,525	166.84	39.1
Candela	2,696	96.82	27.8
Carapelle	6,868	25.00	274.7
Carlantino	746	34.71	21.5
Carpino	3,698	80.05	46.2
Casalnuovo Monterotaro	1,402	48.36	29.0
Casalvecchio di Puglia	1,620	31.93	50.7
Castelluccio dei Sauri	1,958	51.47	38.0
Castelluccio Valmaggiore	1,177	26.79	43.9
Castelnuovo della Daunia	1,218	61.49	19.8
Celenza Valfortore	1,267	65.42	19.4
Celle di San Vito	143	18.41	7.8
Cerignola	56,711	593.93	95.5
Chieuti	1,467	61.52	23.8
Deliceto	3,424	75.85	45.1
Faeto	624	26.10	23.9
Foggia	145,078	509.26	284.9
Ischitella	4,028	85.46	47.1
Isole Tremiti	470	3.18	147.8
Lesina	6,255	160.16	39.1
Lucera	30,335	339.79	89.3
Manfredonia	53,015	354.54	149.5
Mattinata	5,840	73.48	79.5
Monte Sant'Angelo	10,891	245.13	44.4
Monteleone di Puglia	914	36.42	25.1
Motta Montecorvino	583	19.94	29.2
Ordona	3,366	39.57	85.1
Orsara di Puglia	2,469	83.01	29.7
Orta Nova	16,576	105.24	157.5
Panni	673	32.71	20.6
Peschici	4,291	49.39	86.9
Pietramontecorvino	2,367	71.65	33.0
Poggio Imperiale	2,551	52.88	48.2
Rignano Garganico	1,722	89.40	19.3
Rocchetta Sant'Antonio	1,597	72.48	22.0
Rodi Garganico	3,306	13.45	245.8
Roseto Valfortore	982	50.06	19.6
San Giovanni Rotondo	26,129	261.88	99.8
San Marco in Lamis	12,205	234.20	52.1
San Marco la Catola	810	28.63	28.3
San Nicandro Garganico	13,367	173.36	77.1
San Paolo di Civitate	5,322	91.16	58.4
San Severo	48,807	336.31	145.1
Sant'Agata di Puglia	1,737	26.82	64.8
Serracapriola	3,528	143.36	24.6
Stornara	5,778	33.86	170.6
Stornarella	5,402	33.81	159.8
Torremaggiore	16,283	210.01	77.5
Troia	6,491	168.25	38.6
Vico del Gargano	7,152	111.08	64.4
Vieste	13,234	169.19	78.2
Volturara Appula	340	52.00	6.5
Volturino	1,499	58.35	25.7
Zapponeta	3,192	41.75	76.5

== See also ==
- List of municipalities of Apulia
- List of municipalities of Italy
