= Tavoliere delle Puglie =

Plain in Southern Italy

Coordinates: 41°28′N 15°32′E

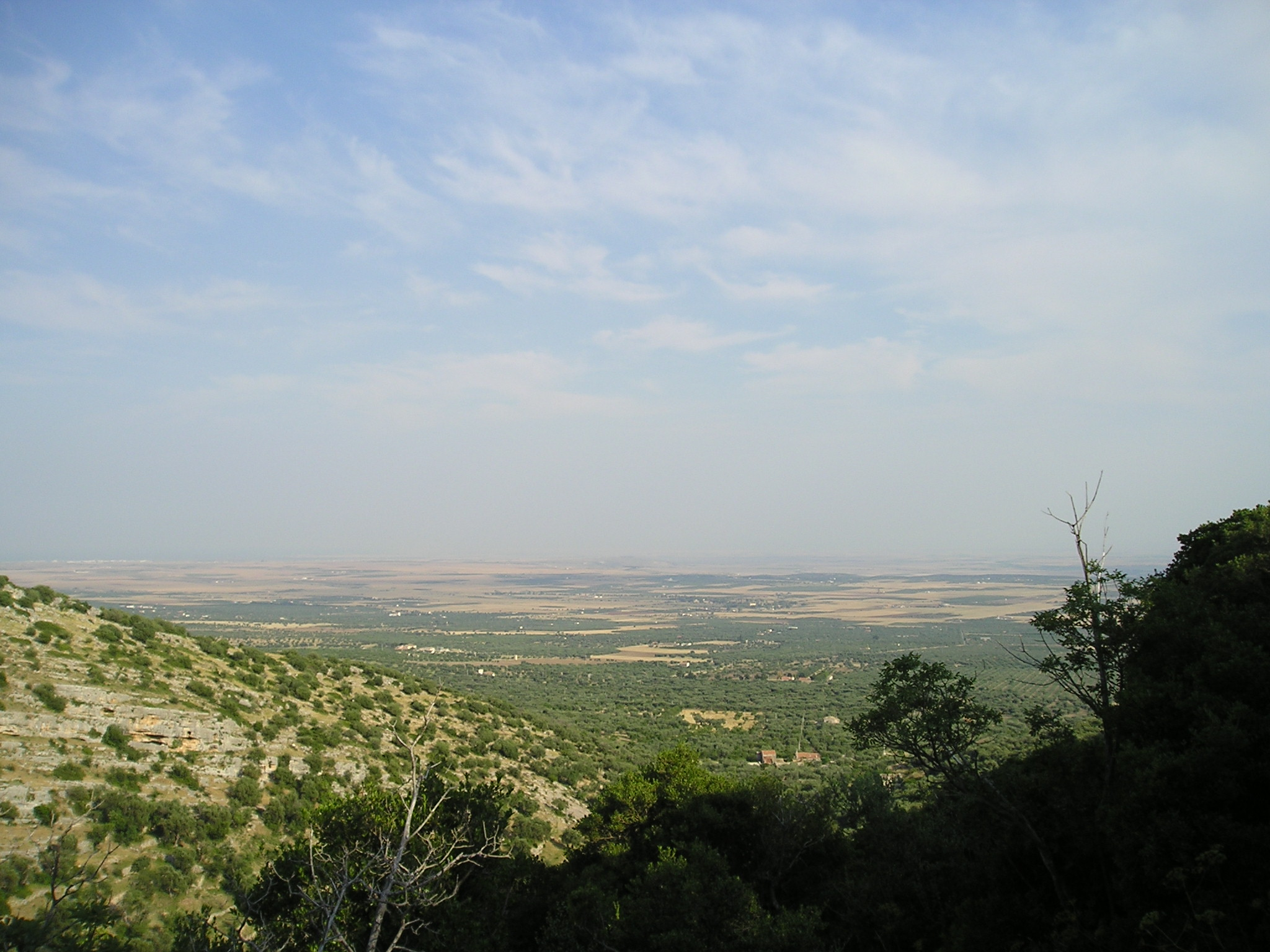
The Tavoliere seen from the Gargano promontory.

The Tavoliere delle Puglie (Italian: [tavoˈljɛːre delle ˈpuʎʎe]; lit. 'Table of the Apulias') is a plain in northern Apulia, southern Italy, occupying nearly a half of the Capitanata traditional region. It covers a surface of c. 3,000 km^{2}, once constituting a sea bottom: it is bounded by the Daunian Pre-Apennines on the West, the Gargano Promontory and the Adriatic Sea on the East, by the Fortore river on the north, and the Ofanto river on the south. It is the largest Italian plain after the Po Valley.

The name Tavoliere derives from the Medieval Latin term Tabularium, a table on which Transumanza officials classified the areas devoted to sheep farming.

In winter the plain is sometimes subject to floods by the Ofanto and the Fortore, while in summer drought is frequent.

The main centres, from north to south, are San Severo, Lucera, Foggia and Cerignola.

== History ==
Neolithic farmers living in Tavoliere over 7000 years ago practiced ritual defleshing of the dead. Light cut marks on the bones suggest the bones were defleshed up to a year after death. They deposited the bones in Scaloria Cave. The human bones were mixed with animal bones, broken pottery and stone tools.

During the Middle Ages the old practices of agriculture and fluvial regulation were lost, the plain being mostly devoted to sheep farming which, using apposite cattle-tracks, reached the Apennines' pasture lands through the Tavoliere. The lands was most marshy and unhealthy.

After extensive works of drainage, the plain is now highly cultivated. Crops include wheat, beet, tomato, especially in the area of Foggia, while also spread are cultivations of olives and grapes, which produce quality oils and wines.

== Communes ==
The comuni in the Tavoliere delle Puglie are:

Alberona, Apricena, Ascoli Satriano, Biccari; Bovino, Candela, Carapelle, Casalvecchio di Puglia, Castelluccio dei Sauri, Castelnuovo della Daunia, Cerignola, Chieuti, Deliceto, Foggia, Lucera, Manfredonia, Margherita di Savoia, Ordona (Herdonia), Orta Nova, Poggio Imperiale, San Ferdinando di Puglia, San Paolo di Civitate, San Severo, Serracapriola, Stornara, Stornarella, Torremaggiore, Trinitapoli, Troia, Volturino, Zapponeta.
