= Cerignola =

Cerignola Ceregnòule (Cerignolano)
- Comune
- Comune di Cerignola
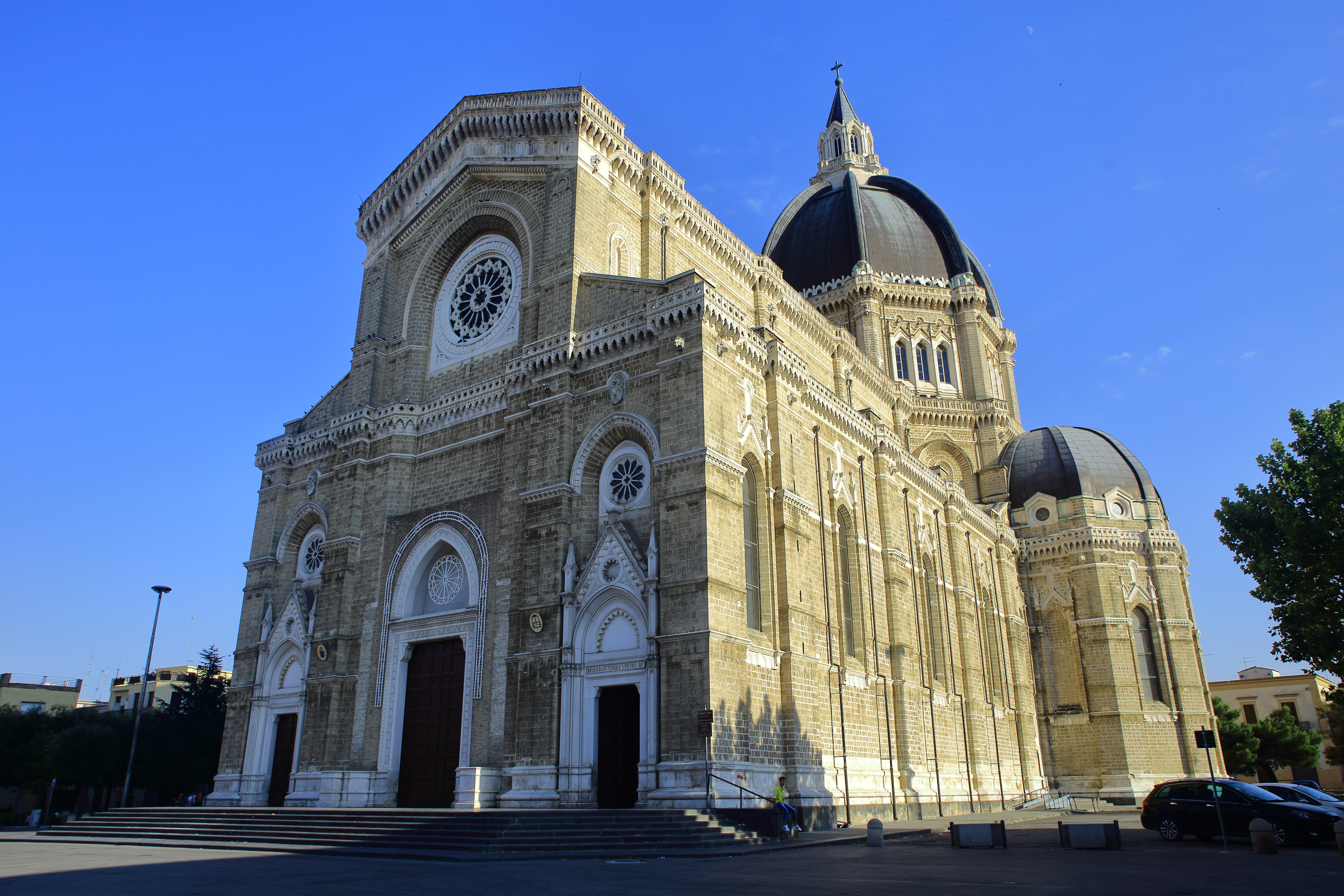
- The cathedral

- Coat of arms

- Cerignola within the Province of Foggia

- Location within Italy Location within Apulia
- Coordinates: 41°16′N 15°54′E
- Country: Italy
- Region: Apulia
- Province: Foggia (FG)
- Frazioni: Angeloni, Borgo Libertà, Borgo Tressanti, Cerignola Campagna, La Pila, Montaltino, Moschella, Posta Incorvera, Posta Uccello, Pozzo Terraneo, Salice, San Giovanni in Fonte, San Michele delle Vigne, Tannioa

Government
  - Mayor: Francesco Bonito

Area
  - Total: 593.93 km^{2} (229.32 sq mi)
- Elevation: 120 m (390 ft)

Population (2026)
  - Total: 56,711
  - Density: 95.484/km^{2} (247.30/sq mi)
- Demonym: Cerignolani
- Time zone: UTC+1 (CET)
  - Summer (DST): UTC+2 (CEST)
- Postal code: 71042
- Dialing code: 0885
- Patron saint: Madonna of Ripalta
- Saint day: September 8
- Website: Official website

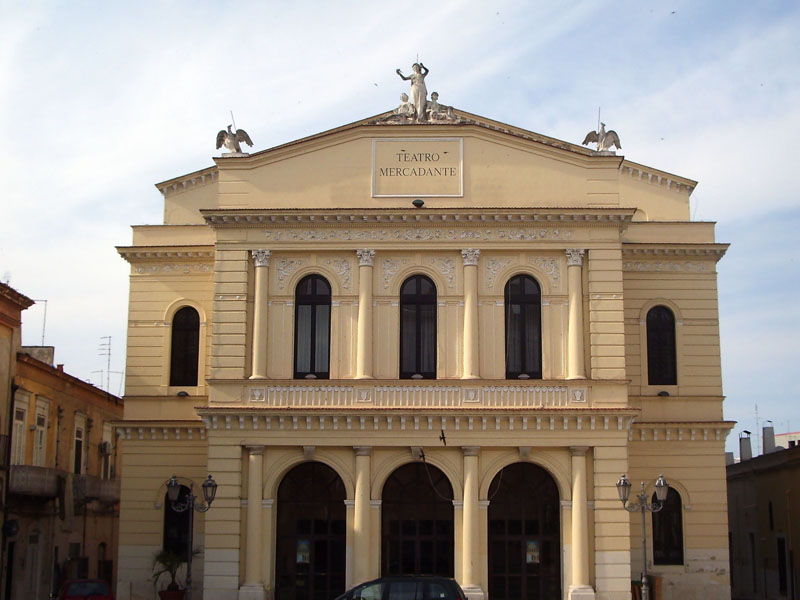
Mercadante Theatre.

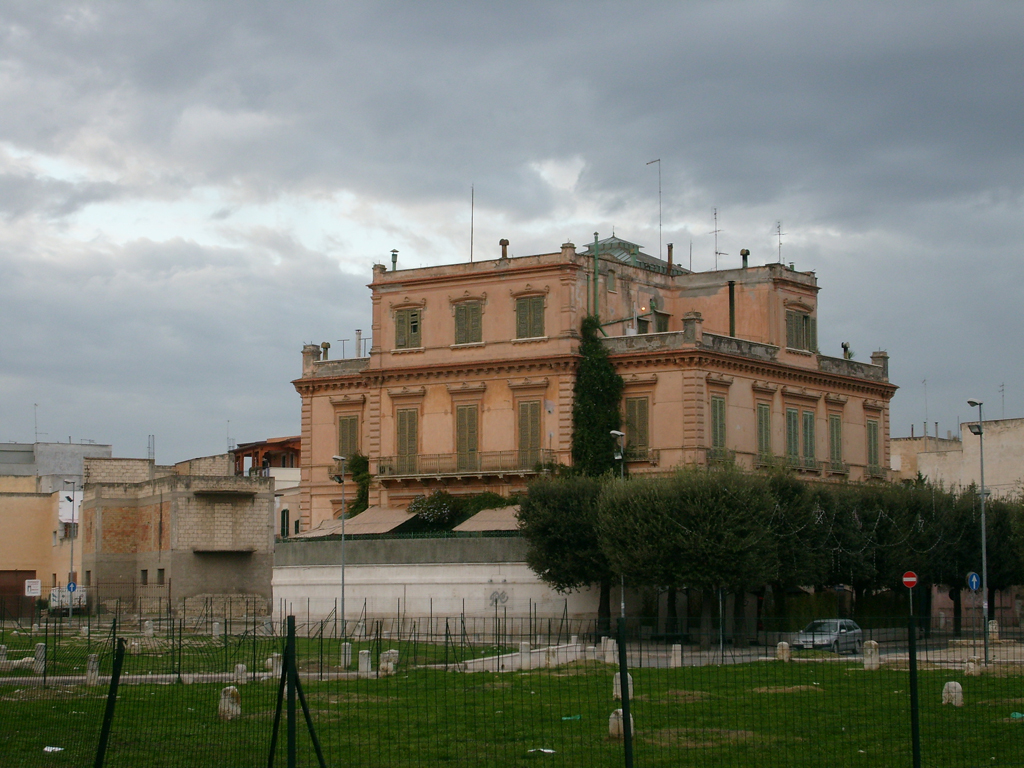
Pavoncelli Palace.

Cerignola (Italian pronunciation: [tʃeriɲˈɲɔːla]; Cerignolano: Ceregnòule [tʃərəɲˈɲɔwlə]) is a town and comune (municipality) in the province of Foggia of the region of Apulia in Italy, 40 kilometres (25 miles) southeast from the town of Foggia. It has the third-largest land area of any municipality in Italy, at 593.93 square kilometres (229.32 sq mi), after Rome and Ravenna, and it has the largest land area of any municipality in Italy among those that are not the provincial capital. It has 56,711 inhabitants.

== History ==
Cerignola occupies the site of Furfane, a station on the ancient Roman Via Traiana between Canusium and Herdoniae.

It was a municipium during the Roman Empire. In the Middle Ages, as part of the Kingdom of Naples, in 1418 it became a fief of the Caracciolo family.

In 1503 the Spaniards under Gonzalo de Córdoba defeated the French under Louis d'Armagnac (6th Duke of Nemours) below the town, a victory which ensured Spain the rule over the kingdom of Naples (see battle of Cerignola) and is considered the first battle whose outcome was determined by gunpowder.

In 17th century the fief passed to the Pignatelli family. Cerignola was rebuilt after a great earthquake in 1731. In the 19th century, after the reclamation of its territory, it has been home to a considerable agricultural production.

== Geography ==
The large municipality is located in the Valley of Ofanto, a strip of land that runs alongside the homonymous river delimiting the southern edge of the Tavoliere Tavoliere. Cerignola is situated in south of the province of Foggia, and spans from the Salt Marshes of Margherita di Savoia to the borders with Basilicata region. It borders the municipalities of Ascoli Satriano, Canosa di Puglia, Carapelle, Lavello, Manfredonia, Ordona, Orta Nova, San Ferdinando di Puglia, Stornara, Stornarella, Trinitapoli and Zapponeta.

Cerignola is the second biggest town of Capitanata for its number of inhabitants as well as for being the largest agriculture centre in its province.

== Demographics ==
As of 2026, the population is 56,711, of which 49.8% are male, and 50.2% are female. Minors make up 17.4% of the population, and seniors make up 19.1%.

Historical population

Year	Pop.	±%
1861	21,628	—
1871	25,089	+16.0%
1881	24,050	−4.1%
1901	31,958	+32.9%
1911	38,097	+19.2%
1921	38,096	−0.0%
1931	38,573	+1.3%
1936	39,540	+2.5%

Year	Pop.	±%
1951	51,320	+29.8%
1961	49,287	−4.0%
1971	47,797	−3.0%
1981	50,819	+6.3%
1991	55,052	+8.3%
2001	57,366	+4.2%
2011	56,653	−1.2%
2021	57,127	+0.8%

Source: ISTAT

=== Immigration ===
As of 2025, immigrants make up 4.9% of the total population. The 5 largest foreign countries of birth are Romania, Bulgaria, Ukraine, Senegal, and Albania.

== Main sights ==
- The Cathedral
- The Chiesa Madre of St. Francis of Assisi (11th-12th centuries)
- Torre Alemanna (13th century), in the frazione Borgo Libertà
- Church of Beata Vergine del Monte Carmelo (16th century)
- Palazzo Cirillo-Farrusi
- Piano delle Fosse del Grano

== Cuisine ==
The Italian wine DOC of Rosso di Cerignola is designated for red wine production only. Grapes are limited to a harvest yield of 14 tonnes/ha with the finished wine required to have at least 12% alcohol. The wine is a blend of at least 55% Uva di Troia, 15-30% Negroamaro, and up to 15% of an assortment of Sangiovese, Barbera, Montepulciano, Malbec and Trebbiano. If the wine is labeled as Riserva then the wine must have been aged at least two years in oak barrels/wood with a minimum alcohol level of 13%.

== Transport ==
Cerignola has a station, Cerignola Campagna, on the Pescara-Bari main railroad (Adriatic railway), served by regional trains. From 1891 to 1956, it was the terminus of a short line to the city centre (Cerignola Città station).

It has also an exit ("Cerignola Est") on the A14 motorway Bologna-Taranto, and one ("Cerignola Ovest") on the A16 motorway Naples-Canosa. Provincial roads connect it to the main centre in the region as well.

Public bus service in the town is provided by STUC company.

== Sport ==
The local football team is the Audace Cerignola, and its home ground is the Domenico Monterisi Stadium.

== Notable people ==
- Nicola Zingarelli, philologist, founder of the Zingarelli Italian dictionary
- Giuseppe Di Vittorio, syndicalist

== International relations ==
=== Twin towns - sister cities ===
Cerignola is twinned with:

- Vizzini, Italy
- Montilla, Spain
- Nemours, France

== See also ==
- Roman Catholic Diocese of Cerignola-Ascoli Satriano
