= San Nicandro Garganico =

San Nicandro Garganico Sannicandro Garganico
- Comune
- Comune di San Nicandro Garganico
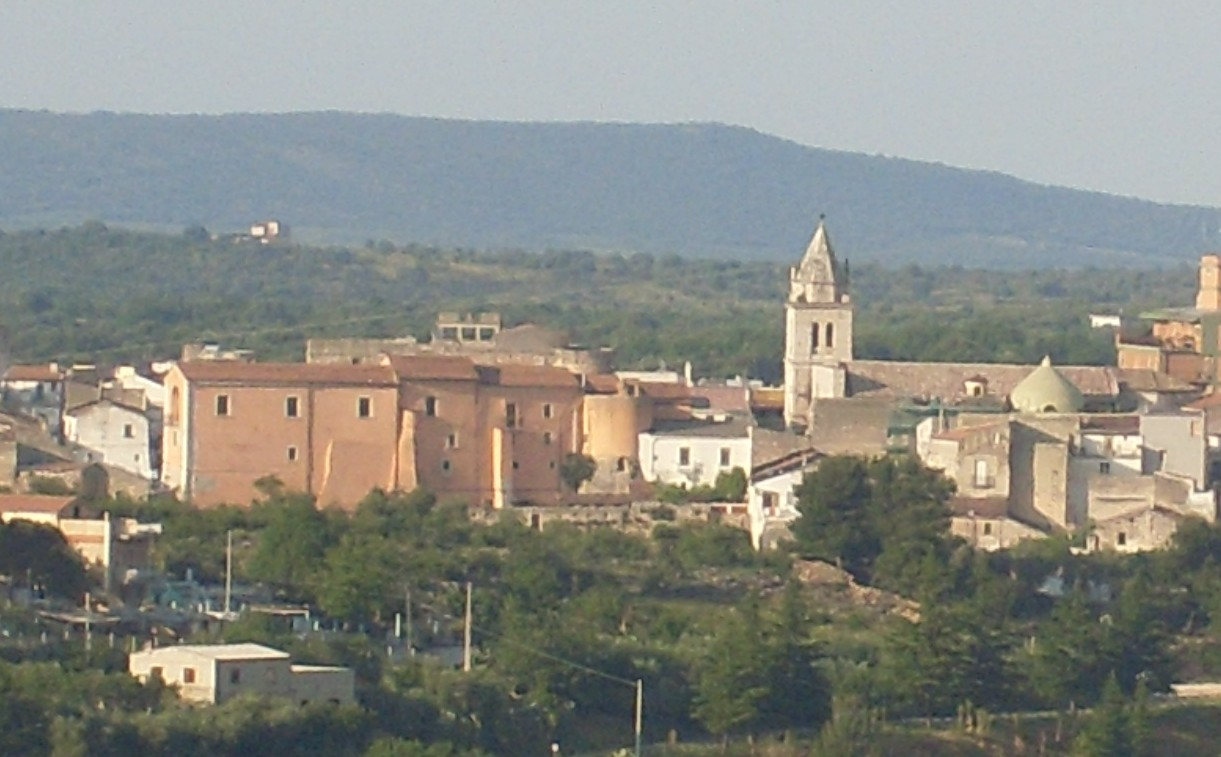
- View of San Nicandro Garganico

- Coat of arms

- Location within Italy Location within Apulia
- Coordinates: 41°50′N 15°34′E
- Country: Italy
- Region: Apulia
- Province: Foggia (FG)
- Frazioni: it:Torre Mileto, it:Dolina Pozzatina and others

Government
  - Mayor: Matteo Vocale

Area
  - Total: 173.36 km^{2} (66.93 sq mi)
- Elevation: 224 m (735 ft)

Population (28 February 2017)
  - Total: 13 409
  - Density: 0.075/km^{2} (0.19/sq mi)
- Demonym: Sannicandresi
- Time zone: UTC+1 (CET)
  - Summer (DST): UTC+2 (CEST)
- Postal code: 71015
- Dialing code: 0882
- Patron saint: Sts. Nikander, Marcian and Daria; Virgin Mary
- Saint day: 17 June, 8 December
- Website: Official website

San Nicandro Garganico (Pugliese: Sànde Lecàndre) known until 1999 as Sannicandro Garganico) is a small city and comune in the province of Foggia in the Apulia region of southeast Italy.

This city is part of the Gargano National Park

The comune is bordered by those of Apricena, Cagnano Varano, Lesina, Poggio Imperiale and San Marco in Lamis.

In 1945, about 30 Italian members of a tiny Sabbatarian sect converted to Judaism. Most of the gerim emigrated to Israel and reside mainly in the cities of Birya and Safed, although some remain in San Nicandro Garganico today.

It is a commercial city but, especially in the summertime, can become very tourististic.

== Main sights ==
- The 16th century collegiate church, often incorrectly called "Cathedral"
- Church of San Giorgio in Terravecchia
- Aragonese-Norman Castle
- Remains of the Roman villa at Sant'Annea
- Torre Mileto (Mileto Tower) with the sea
- Dolina Carsica Pozzatina (The biggest dolinin in Europe and, perhaps, in the world)
