= Rignano Garganico =

- Comune
- Comune di Rignano Garganico
- Coat of arms

- Location within Italy Location within Apulia
- Coordinates: 41°41′N 15°35′E
- Country: Italy
- Region: Apulia
- Province: Foggia (FG)

Government
  - Mayor: Luigi Di Fiore

Area
  - Total: 89.4 km^{2} (34.5 sq mi)
- Elevation: 590 m (1,940 ft)

Population (28 February 2017)
  - Total: 2,033
  - Density: 22.7/km^{2} (58.9/sq mi)
- Demonym: Rignanesi
- Time zone: UTC+1 (CET)
  - Summer (DST): UTC+2 (CEST)
- Postal code: 71010
- Dialing code: 0882
- Patron saint: St. Roch
- Saint day: 16 August
- Website: Official website

Rignano Garganico is a town and comune of the province of Foggia in the Apulia region of southern Italy.

== Geography ==
Apricena, Foggia, San Marco in Lamis, San Severo and San Giovanni Rotondo are neighbouring towns. In 2017, migrants were removed from a refugee camp setup in Rignano Garganico.

== Main sights ==
- Paglicci Cave and the annexed museum
