= Stornara =

- Comune
- Comune di Stornara
- Location within Italy Location within Apulia
- Coordinates: 41°17′N 15°46′E
- Country: Italy
- Region: Apulia
- Province: Foggia (FG)
- Frazioni: Cerignola, Ordona, Orta Nova, Stornarella

Area
  - Total: 33.65 km^{2} (12.99 sq mi)
- Elevation: 74 m (243 ft)

Population (31 December 2003)
  - Total: 4,805
  - Density: 142.8/km^{2} (369.8/sq mi)
- Demonym: Stornaresi
- Time zone: UTC+1 (CET)
  - Summer (DST): UTC+2 (CEST)
- Postal code: 71047
- Dialing code: 0885
- ISTAT code: 071054
- Patron saint: San Rocco
- Saint day: 16 August

Stornara is a town and comune in the province of Foggia in the Apulia region of southeast Italy.

== Stornara Airfield ==
Stornara Airfield was a semi-permanent heavy bomber airfield located approximately 14 km (10 mi) west of Cerignola in Apulia, Italy 41°17′30″N 015°44′30″E Its single PSP runway with extensive taxiway and hardstand parking areas and steel control tower were built by the US Army Corps Of Enigineers in September 1943. The air field opened in January 1944. The only known unit to operate from the field was the 456th Bombardment Group, from January 1944 until July 1945. 456BG consisted of 744, 745, 746 and 747 Bomb Squadrons, flying B-24 Liberators. The airfield remained operational until the end of the war and the airfield closed in August 1945. It is used today as agricultural land.

== Stramurales ==
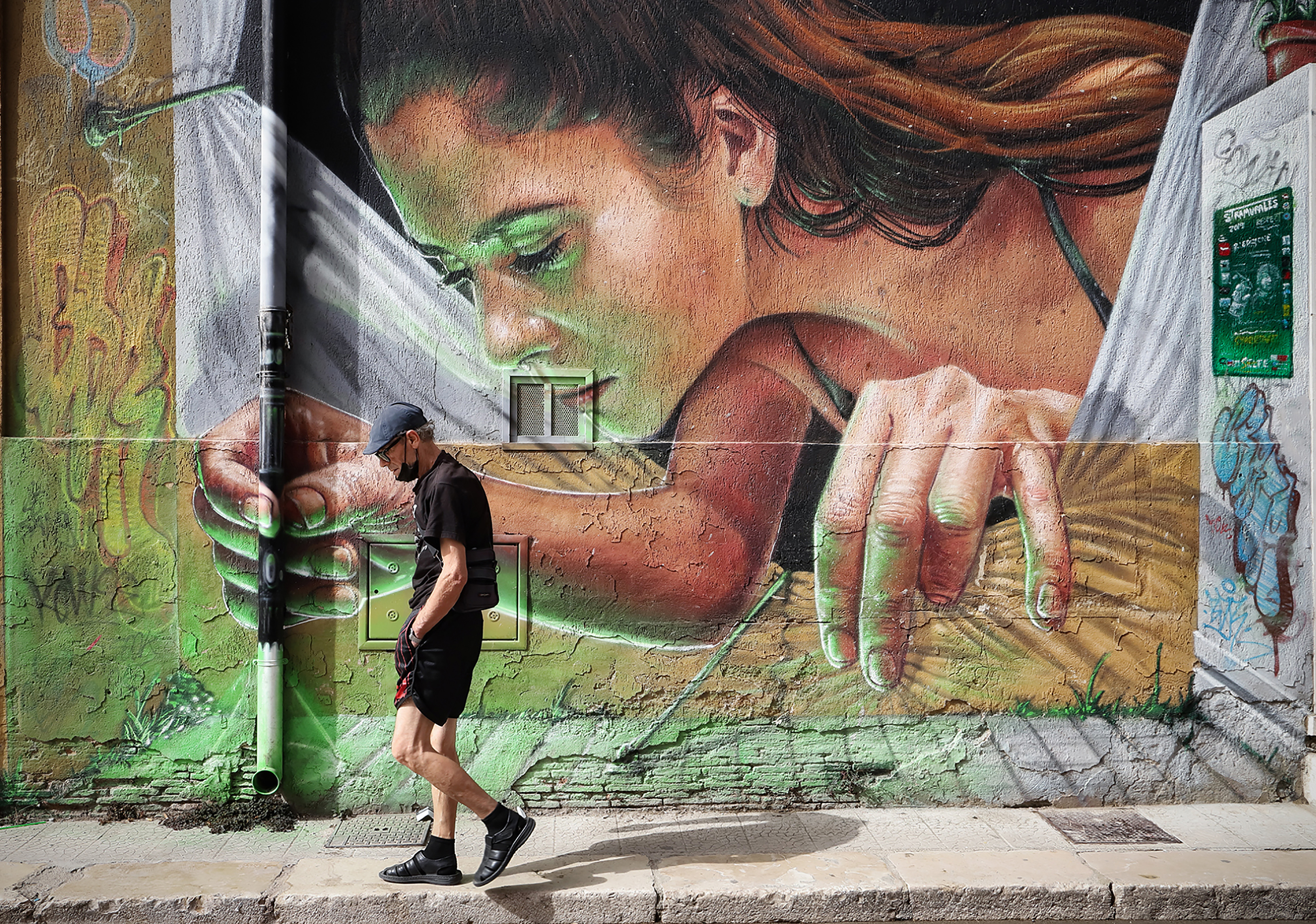
A mural in Stornara

Stornara has hosted the street art festival Stramurales since 2017. Over the years, more than 140 murals have been added to town walls. Stramurales and the artwork have helped increase tourism revenue by 25% since 2020. Locals credit the art with a rise in new businesses and a growing population.
