= Varano =

Varano may refer to:

== People ==
- Da Varano, Italian noble family
- Federico Varano (born 1995), Italian footballer
- Michele Antonio Varano (born 1951), Italian criminal
- Saint Camilla Battista da Varano
- Giovanni Maria da Varano, last Varano duke of Camerino

== Places ==
- Varano Borghi, comune in Lombardy, Italy
- Varano de' Melegari, comune in Emilia-Romagna, Italy
- Cagnano Varano, comune in Apulia, Italy
- Lago di Varano, lake in Apulia, Italy
