= Orta Nova railway station =

Railway station in Italy

Orta Nova

General information
- Location: Orta Nova; Orta Nova, Foggia, Apulia; Italy
- Coordinates: 41°21′01″N 15°43′55″E
- Operator: Rete Ferroviaria Italiana
- Line: Ancona–Lecce (Trenitalia)
- Platforms: 3
- Train operators: Trenitalia

Other information
- Classification: Bronze
Location
- Location within Apulia Location within Southern Italy Location within Italy

Orta Nova (Italian: Stazione di Orta Nova) is a railway station in the Italian town of Orta Nova, in the Province of Foggia, Apulia. The station lies on the Adriatic Railway (Ancona–Lecce). The train services are operated by Trenitalia.

== Train services ==
The station is served by the following service(s):

- Regional services (Treno regionale) Foggia - Barletta - Bari

== See also ==
- Railway stations in Italy
- List of railway stations in Apulia
- Rail transport in Italy
- History of rail transport in Italy
