= Ordona =

- Comune
- Comune di Ordona
- Location within Italy Location within Apulia
- Coordinates: 41°19′N 15°38′E
- Country: Italy
- Region: Apulia
- Province: Foggia (FG)

Area
  - Total: 39.96 km^{2} (15.43 sq mi)
- Elevation: 120 m (390 ft)

Population (31 December 2003)
  - Total: 2,584
  - Density: 64.66/km^{2} (167.5/sq mi)
- Demonym: Ordonesi
- Time zone: UTC+1 (CET)
  - Summer (DST): UTC+2 (CEST)
- Postal code: 71040
- Dialing code: 0885
- Patron saint: San Leone Vescovo
- Saint day: 22 January

UNESCO World Heritage Site
- Part of: Via Appia. Regina Viarum
- Criteria: Cultural: iii, iv, vi
- Reference: 1708-017
- Inscription: 2024 (46th Session)

Ordona is a small town and comune of the province of Foggia in the region of Apulia in southern Italy.

== Geography ==
Ascoli Satriano, Carapelle, Foggia, Orta Nova, Cerignola are nearby towns.

== History ==
Ordona lies near the ancient Daunian site of Herdonia or Herdoniae, a Roman town where Hannibal fought a major battle against the Roman Army. The ruins of Herdonia were discovered in the years after the Second World War, and remain only partially excavated; they are a short drive from the present-day town.

The ancient centre, founded by the Daunians, immediately enjoyed a noteworthy cultural development and saw its maximum splendour. Its economic decline began during the 4th century BC. The construction of defensive walls during this period suggests a period of battles with other centres in the region, probably comprising clashes with the Greek hegemonic cities in the territory, among them neighbouring Taranto. It passed over to the Romans, with the rest of Apulia, after the wars of the Greek-Messapian League, commanded by King Pyrrhus of Epirus (280–275 BC). Herdonia was a protagonist during the Second Punic War (219–202 BC) and in particular, during the events linked to the war's most famous battle at Cannae on 2 August 216 BC. According to the Roman historian Livy, after the Battle of Cannae the City passed to Hannibal, but then was soon recovered by the Romans, in 214 BC; it was taken once more by the Carthaginian General Hannibal who demolished it completely and saw its population transferred to Metaponto and Turi. From this moment on, the city did not recover until its insertion along the Via Traiana route, a coastal alternative of the Via Appia (Appian Way), at the beginning of the 2nd century AD. Today's central habitation began in the 9th century, but had difficulties in developing due to terrible conditions in the territory. In fact, during the Medieval era, the Tavoliere delle Puglie (Apulian Table) lost its agricultural vocation and became a main transhumance for sheep arriving from all of central Italy. The Jesuits took over the centre and tried to push Ordona's economy by reclaiming part of its territory and allowing families to settle here. In 1774, Ordona became part of royal Bourbon property, allowing important new reclamation work to take place throughout the entire 19th century. Remains from the Roman Erdonia are situated in the following areas: the Forum, the Augustea Basilica, a part of the Via Traiana route where one can visit the remains of shops and the Market (Macellum), the remains of a temple from the Imperial era, the Amphitheatre and thermal baths with mosaic flooring. Below this level, in the area of the Basilica, finds uncovered tombs and houses from the Daunian city. The diffusion of Christianity is testified by the remains of a Paleochristian Basilica from the 6th century AD. Today's digs have still not touched all the various levels and the Herdonia site could still reserve many surprises for archaeologists and enthusiastic visitors.

== Economy ==
Ordona's economy is agricultural.
