= Apulia Carbonate Platform =

The Apulia Carbonate Platform in Apulia, Italy, was a major palaeogeographic element of the southern margin of the Mesozoic Tethys Ocean. It is one of the so-called peri-Adriatic platforms, which are comparable to the Bahama Banks in their carbonate facies, shape, size, and subsidence rate and, also, in the internal architecture.

The Apulia Platform, which is part of the stable and relatively undeformed foreland of the Apennine thrust belt, is bounded on both sides by basinal deposits; westward the margin is buried under the Apennine thrust sheets, to the east the adjacent paleogeographic domains are the vast Ionian Basin to the south and the Umbria-Marche Basin to the north. To the west, the Apulia Platform plunges downfaulted underneath the terrigenous sediments of the Apennine foredeep; to the southeast, the Jurassic–Early Cretaceous margin lies 20–30 km offshore from the present Apulia coastline.

== Gargano Promontory ==
The Gargano Promontory is an area of the Apulia Platform. The Gargano Promontory and the Maiella Mountain, which now is part of the external Apennine thrust belt, are the only areas where the transition from platform facies to basin facies is exposed on land. In the Gargano area this transition has been investigated extensively in the last decade. Since the mid-1960s Agip geologists and the Italian Geological Survey recognized that the western part of the promontory is part of the shallow-water Apulia Platform, whereas the eastern part is characterized by slope and basinal deposits.

The backbone of the Gargano Promontory consists of a thick pile (3000–3500 m) of Jurassic and Cretaceous shallow-water carbonates. A small outcrop of Upper Triassic evaporite (Anidriti di Burano) and black limestone is present on the northern seashore (Punta delle Pietre Nere). These rocks have been encountered also by wells Gargano-1 (G.1 - Conoco) and Foresta Umbra-1 (F.U. - AGIP). The outcropping succession comprises Upper Jurassic to Eocene carbonate rocks representing platform-to-basin settings. Minor scattered outcrops of Miocene sediments, unconformably overlying the Cretaceous and Jurassic platform, are present in many parts of the promontory, mainly along the lowland border zones (Cagnano Varano, Sannicandro, Apricena, Manfredonia), and also one site inland near San Giovanni Rotondo.

On the basis of physical stratigraphic relationships and of the presence of evident bounding surfaces, the Jurassic-Eocene succession can be subdivided into six major packages of sediments, which can be classified as second-order depositional sequences. The lower three sequences (Callovian to Albian) are represented by the entire spectrum of sediments from platform to slope and basin, and the younger ones (Cenomanian to Lutetian) largely by slope and basin deposits.

Probably the most typical and significant feature of the Gargano slope and basin setting is the presence of huge megabreccia bodies which, in terms of sequence stratigraphic terminology, can be interpreted as typical lowstand wedges.
