= Volturino =

- Comune
- Comune di Volturino
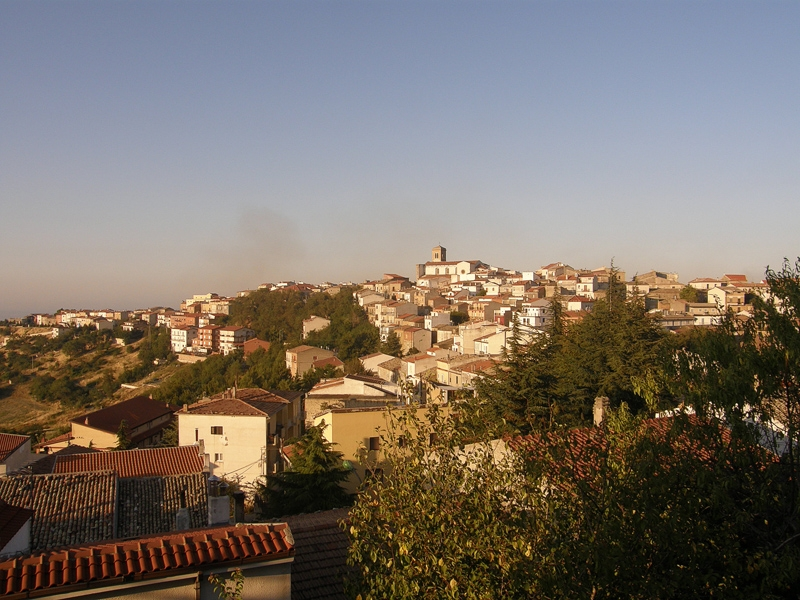
- View of Volturino

- Location within Italy Location within Apulia
- Coordinates: 41°29′N 15°7′E
- Country: Italy
- Region: Apulia
- Province: Foggia (FG)
- Frazioni: Carignani, Serritella, Scaricaturo

Government
  - Mayor: Antonio Santacroce

Area
  - Total: 58.35 km^{2} (22.53 sq mi)
- Elevation: 735 m (2,411 ft)

Population (31 December 2010)
  - Total: 1,800
  - Density: 31/km^{2} (80/sq mi)
- Demonym: Volturinesi
- Time zone: UTC+1 (CET)
  - Summer (DST): UTC+2 (CEST)
- Postal code: 71030
- Dialing code: 0881
- Patron saint: Madonna della Serritella
- Saint day: First Sunday in May, 8 September
- Website: Official website

Volturino (Pugliese: Vuterìne) is a village and comune in the province of Foggia, in the Apulia region of southern Italy.

It is approximately 51.4 kilometres (31.9 mi) from Foggia. The village is bordered by Alberona, Lucera, Motta Montecorvino, Pietramontecorvino, Volturara Appula.
