= Casalnuovo Monterotaro =

- Comune
- Comune di Casalnuovo Monterotaro
- Coat of arms

- Location within Italy Location within Apulia
- Coordinates: 41°37′N 15°6′E
- Country: Italy
- Region: Apulia
- Province: Foggia (FG)
- Frazioni: Monterotaro

Government
  - Mayor: Pasquale De Vita

Area
  - Total: 48.10 km^{2} (18.57 sq mi)
- Elevation: 432 m (1,417 ft)

Population (28 February 2017)
  - Total: 1,532
  - Density: 31.85/km^{2} (82.49/sq mi)
- Demonym: Casalnovesi
- Time zone: UTC+1 (CET)
  - Summer (DST): UTC+2 (CEST)
- Postal code: 71033
- Dialing code: 0881
- Patron saint: St. Mary of the Rocca
- Saint day: 15 August
- Website: Official website

Casalnuovo Monterotaro is a town and comune in the province of Foggia in the Apulia region of southeast Italy. The town is located in the Monti Dauni. It was historically an Arbëreshë settlement, the inhabitants however no longer use the Albanian language.
