= Rodi Garganico =

- Comune
- Comune di Rodi milici
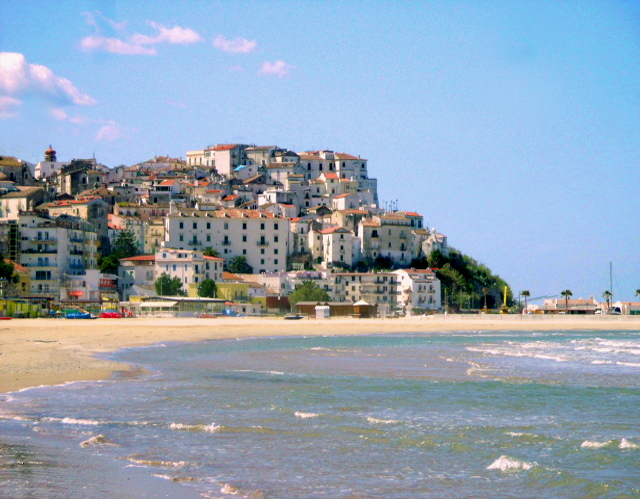
- View of Rodi Garganico

- Coat of arms

- Location within Italy Location within Apulia
- Coordinates: 41°55′46″N 15°53′05″E
- Country: Italy
- Region: Apulia
- Province: Province of Foggia (FG)
- Frazioni: Lido del Sole

Government
  - Mayor: Carmine D'Anelli

Area
  - Total: 13.23 km^{2} (5.11 sq mi)
- Elevation: 46 m (151 ft)

Population (30 November 2016)
  - Total: 3,682
  - Density: 278.3/km^{2} (720.8/sq mi)
- Demonym: Rodiani
- Time zone: UTC+1 (CET)
  - Summer (DST): UTC+2 (CEST)
- Postal code: 71012
- Dialing code: 0884
- Patron saint: Madonna della Libera
- Saint day: 2 July
- Website: Official website

Rodi Garganico (Italian pronunciation: [ˈrɔːdi ɡarˈɡaːniko]; Garganico: Roud' [ˈrəʉdə] or Rur' [ˈruːrə]) is a town and commune in the province of Foggia, Apulia, south-eastern Italy. Located on a promontory east of the Lago di Varano, it is part of the Gargano National Park and of the Mountain Community of Gargano.

Rodi is center for the production of citrus fruits such as Arance del Gargano (Gargano Oranges) and Lemon "Femminiello" of Gargano, both DOP products cultivated since the Middle Ages.

It is a seaside resort with several long beaches located both west and east to the town.

== History ==
Rodi is located in an area inhabited since prehistoric (Palaeolithic and Neolithic) times. According to early 19th-century historian Michelangelo Manicone, its origins are connected to the Dauni ancient people, while, according to other version, it could have been founded by Greek colonists from Rhodes. Pliny the Elder mentions a Portus Garnae which has been identified as the modern Rodi Garganico.

After the fall of the Western Roman Empire, Rodi was destroyed by the Ostrogoths in 485 AD and rebuilt in 553 after the Gothic War. In 950 it was attacked by the Saracens. In 1461 it was occupied by the Aragonese. Starting from the 16th century, it became one of the main centers for the production and trading of agrumes in southern Italy.

== Sources ==
- Canepari, Luciano (1999). Il D^{i}PI: dizionario di pronuncia italiana (in Italian). Roma: Zanichelli. ISBN 88-08-09344-1.
- Hardy, Paula; Hole, Abigail; Pozzan, Olivia (2008). "The Gargano Promontory". Puglia and Basilicata Travel Guide. Foggia: EDT. ISBN 978-88-6040-277-6. Archived from the original on 20 February 2008.
- Manicone, Michelangelo (1806). La Fisica Appula (in Italian). Naples: Domenico San Giacomo Editore.
