= Deliceto =

- Comune
- Comune di Deliceto
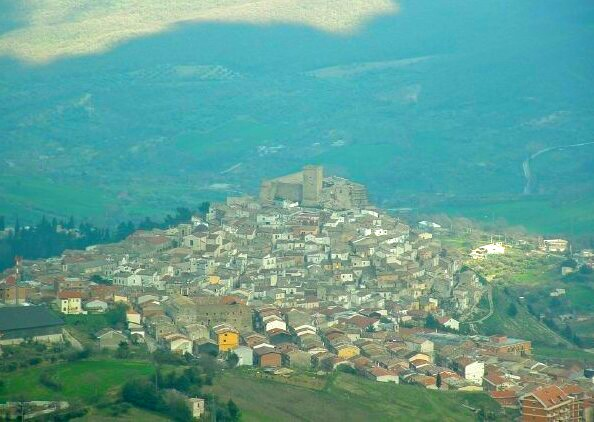
- View of Deliceto

- Location within Italy Location within Apulia
- Coordinates: 41°13′N 15°23′E
- Country: Italy
- Region: Apulia
- Province: Foggia (FG)

Government
  - Mayor: Pasquale Bizzarro

Area
  - Total: 75.65 km^{2} (29.21 sq mi)
- Elevation: 575 m (1,886 ft)

Population (28 February 2017)
  - Total: 3,769
  - Density: 49.82/km^{2} (129.0/sq mi)
- Demonym: Delicetani
- Time zone: UTC+1 (CET)
  - Summer (DST): UTC+2 (CEST)
- Postal code: 71026
- Dialing code: 0881
- Patron saint: St. Benvenuto, Maria S.S. dell'Olmitello
- Saint day: 22 September
- Website: Official website

Deliceto (Irpinian: Delecìte) is a small town and comune in the province of Foggia, from which it is 40.3 kilometres (25.0 mi), in the Apulia region of southeast Italy. Adjacent towns are Ascoli Satriano (to the east); Bovino, Castelluccio dei Sauri (to the north and the north-west); Sant'Agata di Puglia (to the south); Candela (to the south-east); Accadia (to the south-west).

Deliceto rises on the peak of a hill, surrounded by woods and streams. The municipality's territory lies between 207 and 951 metres (679 and 3,120 ft) above sea level. Its name is due to the Latin expression "Deo licet", i.e. "It is alright to God".
