= Carlantino =

- Comune
- Comune di Carlantino
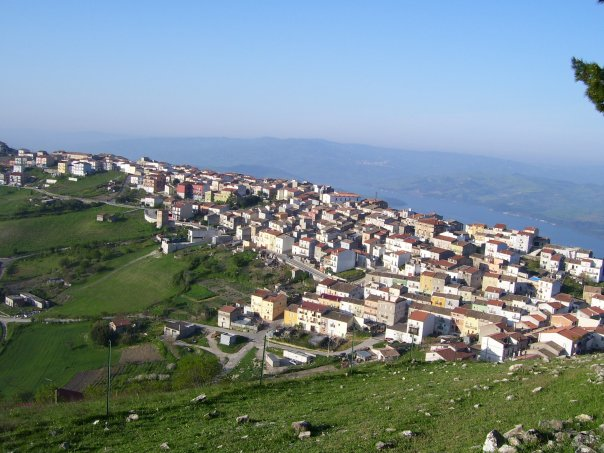
- View of Carlantino

- Location within Italy Location within Apulia
- Coordinates: 41°36′N 14°58′E
- Country: Italy
- Region: Apulia
- Province: Foggia (FG)

Government
  - Mayor: Dino D'Amelio

Area
  - Total: 34.71 km^{2} (13.40 sq mi)
- Elevation: 558 m (1,831 ft)

Population (28 February 2017)
  - Total: 941
  - Density: 27.1/km^{2} (70.2/sq mi)
- Demonym: Carlantinesi
- Time zone: UTC+1 (CET)
  - Summer (DST): UTC+2 (CEST)
- Postal code: 71030
- Dialing code: 0881
- Patron saint: St Donato and Saint Roch
- Saint day: 7 August
- Website: Official website

Carlantino (Foggiano: Carlandìnë) is a village and comune in the province of Foggia in the Apulia region of southeast Italy.
