= San Marco la Catola =

- Comune
- Comune di San Marco la Catola
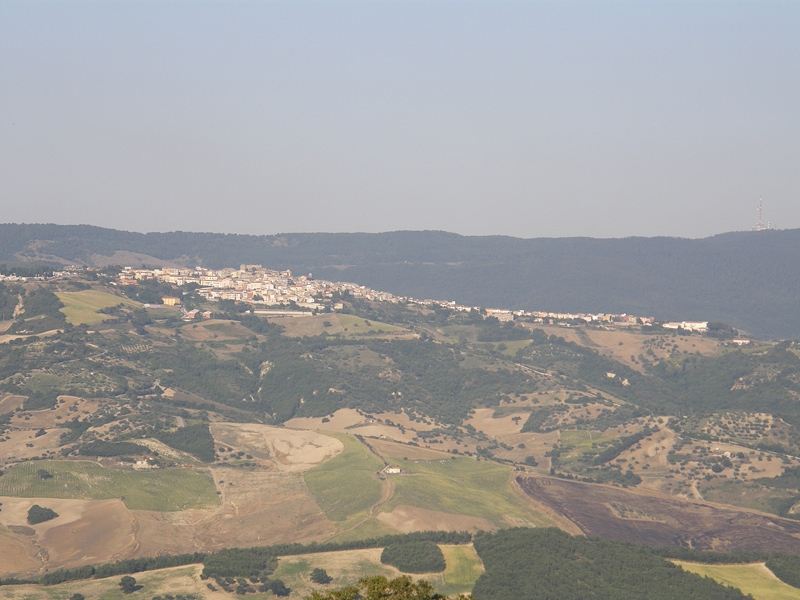
- View of San Marco la Catola

- Coat of arms

- Location within Italy Location within Apulia
- Coordinates: 41°35′N 14°58′E
- Country: Italy
- Region: Apulia
- Province: Foggia (FG)

Government
  - Mayor: Luigi Piacquadio

Area
  - Total: 28.63 km^{2} (11.05 sq mi)
- Elevation: 686 m (2,251 ft)

Population (2025)
  - Total: 879
  - Density: 30.7/km^{2} (79.5/sq mi)
- Demonym: Sammarchesi
- Time zone: UTC+1 (CET)
  - Summer (DST): UTC+2 (CEST)
- Postal code: 71030
- Dialing code: 0881
- Patron saint: St. Liberatus Martyr
- Saint day: 19 August
- Website: Official website

San Marco la Catola is a town and comune in the province of Foggia in the Apulia region of southeast Italy.

It is a small town built around an ancient medieval castle that still resides in the center of town. The castle has been inhabited by various monarchical leaders in the past, although it is associated most with Duke Pignatelli. The town has a rich history going back to at least the 12th century. It was originally a frontier fort, but over the years a small town was built around it.

Sights include the castle (now in ruins), perhaps dating to the 13th century, and the Sanctuary of the Madonna of Josafat (16th century).
