= Lake Lesina =

- Lago di Lesina

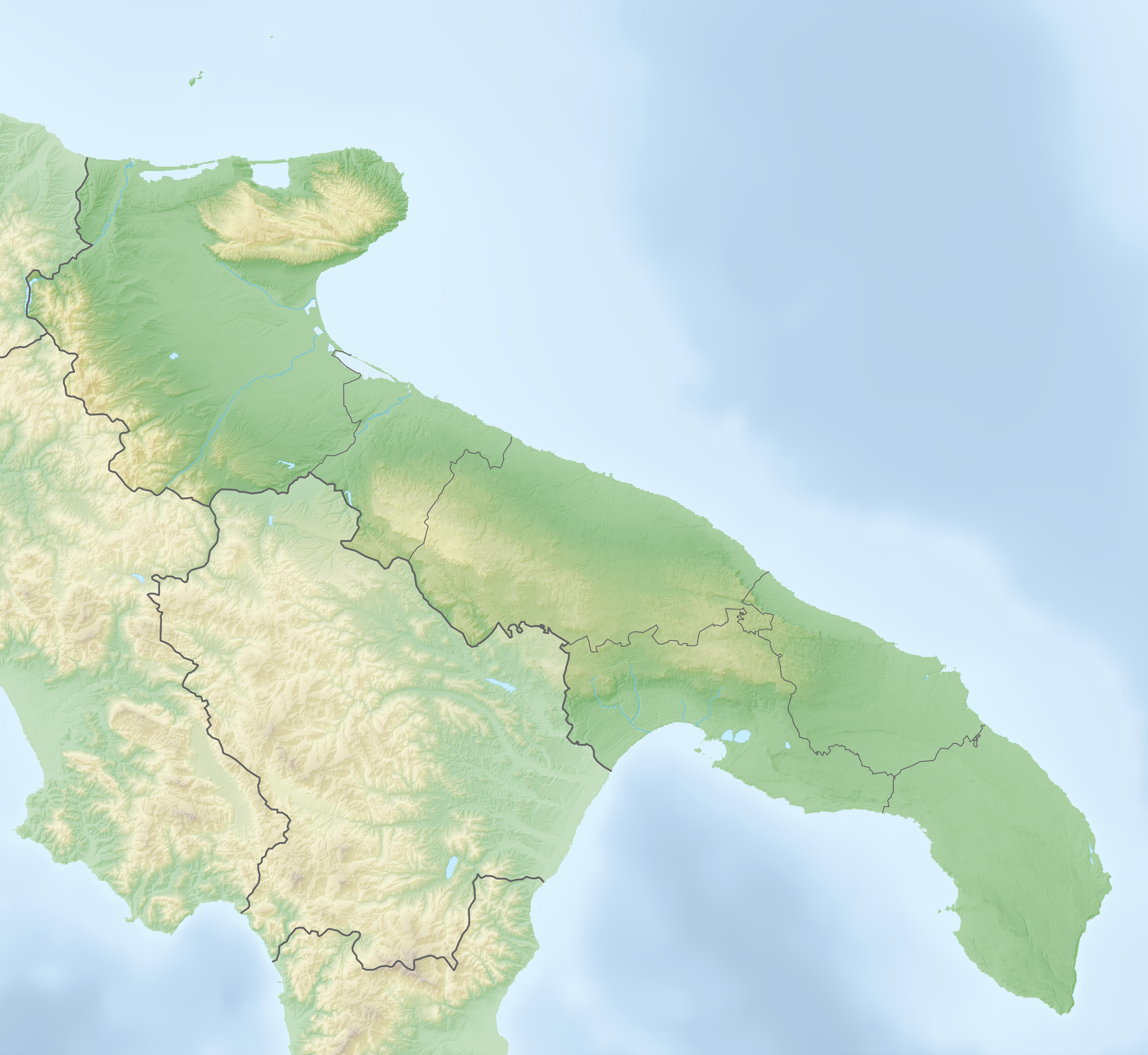
- Location within Apulia
- Location: Province of Foggia, Apulia
- Coordinates: 41°53′16″N 15°26′25″E
- Lake type: lagoon
- Primary outflows: Foce Acquarotta, Foce Schiapparo
- Catchment area: 447 km^{2} (173 sq mi)
- Basin countries: Italy
- Max. length: 22 km (14 mi)
- Max. width: 3.5 km (2.2 mi)
- Surface area: 51.4 km^{2} (19.8 sq mi)
- Average depth: 0.7 m (2 ft 4 in)
- Max. depth: 1.7 m (5 ft 7 in)
- Residence time: 100 days (summer 306 days, winter 31 days)
- Surface elevation: 0 m (0 ft)

Lake Lesina (Italian: Lago di Lesina [ˈlaːɡo di ˈleːzina, - ˈlɛːzina] or Laguna di Lesina; Latin: Lacus Pantanus), situated in the north of Apulia between Tavoliere delle Puglie and the promontory of Gargano, is the ninth largest lake in Italy and the second largest in the southern part of the country. It is brackish, about 22 km long, an average of 2.4 km wide, and covers an area of 51.4 square kilometres.

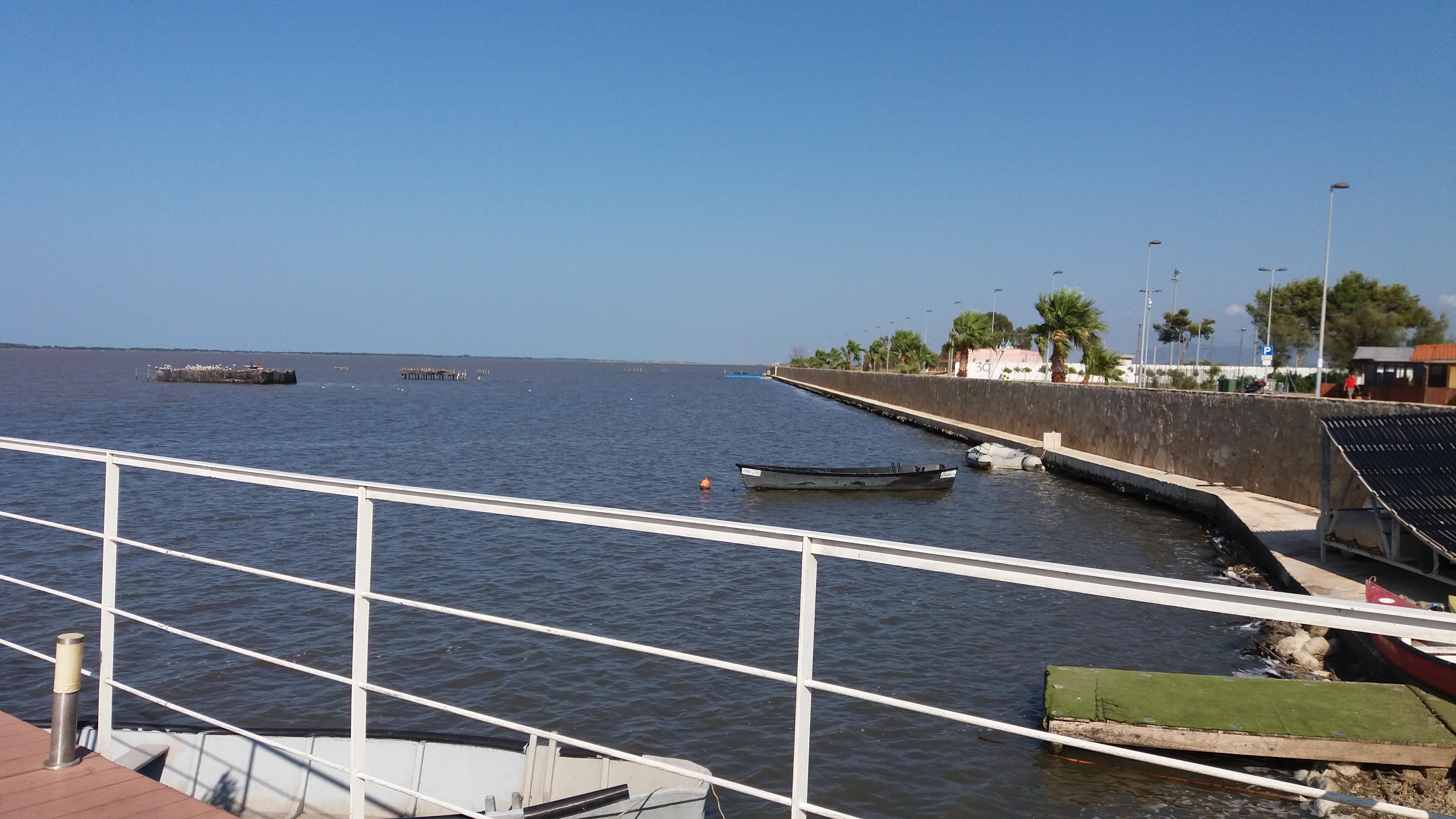
Lake Lesina

Two canals, Acquarotta and Schiapparo, link it the lake to the Adriatic Sea, from which it is separated by a long dune known as Bosco Isola, between one and two kilometres in width and sixteen in length. Numerous streams provide the lake with a modest supply of fresh water.

The lake is very shallow with an average depth of about 70 cm and a maximum depth of less than 2 metres. Its large population of eels provides a traditional source of income for the people of Lesina.
