= Castelluccio Valmaggiore =

- Comune
- Comune di Castelluccio Valmaggiore
- Coat of arms

- Location within Italy Location within Apulia
- Coordinates: 41°21′N 15°12′E
- Country: Italy
- Region: Apulia
- Province: Foggia (FG)

Government
  - Mayor: Giuseppe Campanaro

Area
  - Total: 26.79 km^{2} (10.34 sq mi)
- Elevation: 630 m (2,070 ft)

Population (28 February 2017)
  - Total: 1,292
  - Density: 48.23/km^{2} (124.9/sq mi)
- Demonym: Castelluccesi
- Time zone: UTC+1 (CET)
  - Summer (DST): UTC+2 (CEST)
- Postal code: 71020
- Dialing code: 0881
- Website: Official website

Castelluccio Valmaggiore is a town and comune in the province of Foggia in the Apulia region of southeast Italy.

It takes its name from the castle built here by the Byzantines around 1000 AD (Castrum Vallis Maiors), as the fortification commanded the valley of the Celone river. Of the castle only a 20-metre (66 ft) high polygonal tower remains today.
