= Carpino =

- Comune
- Comune di Carpino
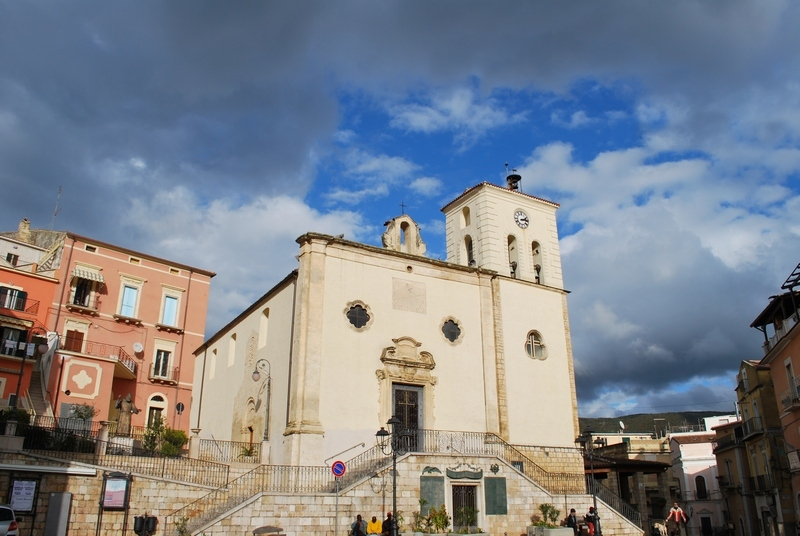

- Location within Italy Location within Apulia
- Coordinates: 41°51′N 15°51′E
- Country: Italy
- Region: Apulia
- Province: Foggia (FG)

Government
  - Mayor: Manzo Rocco since 29/May/2007

Area
  - Total: 82.49 km^{2} (31.85 sq mi)
- Elevation: 147 m (482 ft)

Population (31 December 2003)
  - Total: 4,642
  - Density: 56.27/km^{2} (145.7/sq mi)
- Demonym: Carpinesi
- Time zone: UTC+1 (CET)
  - Summer (DST): UTC+2 (CEST)
- Postal code: 71010
- Dialing code: 0884
- Patron saint: Saint Cyril

Carpino (Pugliese: Carpìne) is a coastal town and comune of the Italian region of Apulia, lying on the Gargano peninsula.

The town's name has been linked to the rebirth of the traditional folk songs of Gargano, which have artistic value and deserve to be preserved and studied. The group "Cantori di Carpino" (Carpino Singers), by reinterpreting ancient tarantellas, has enabled the development of a broadly articulated project regarding the traditional popular music of southern Italy.

The town's main square, now called the "Piazza del Popolo", or People's Square, is the historic home of the folk music festival and its influences. The Carpino Folk Festival is an event that includes several cultural elements, brought together under a single symbol, with the performing arts, and especially music, dance, and theater with popular roots, but also workshops, conferences, roundtables, workshops, presentations of literature and cinema, with a full program of live performances, original and energetic, showing the richness and musical diversity of an area that has many natural resources, as well as landscape and historical importance. The festival has high artistic achievements and standards, although it has not yet fully exploited its material in a structured, integrated and accessible way, to represent real strategic factors in economic and social development.

Standing on a hill which has many well tended olive trees, Carpino has been dubbed "Città dell’olio" (Oil Town) because of its business of producing olive oil. Noteworthy are the archaeological site of the "grotte di Minutille" (the Minutille caves), the Church of the Holy Cross, the Church of Saint George, and the Church of Saint Cyril.

== History ==
The town is first mentioned in historical records in 1158, in a bull of pope Adrian IV, with which the abbey of Monte Sacro obtained privileges on the church of St. Peter e St. Mary near the "castellum capralis", a location identifiable as the municipality, as subsequently confirmed from historical documents.
