= Celenza Valfortore =

- Comune
- Comune di Celenza Valfortore
- Coat of arms

- Location within Italy Location within Apulia
- Coordinates: 41°34′N 14°59′E
- Country: Italy
- Region: Apulia
- Province: Foggia (FG)

Government
  - Mayor: Luigi Iamele

Area
  - Total: 65.42 km^{2} (25.26 sq mi)
- Elevation: 480 m (1,570 ft)

Population (28 February 2017)
  - Total: 1,569
  - Density: 23.98/km^{2} (62.12/sq mi)
- Demonym: Celenzani
- Time zone: UTC+1 (CET)
  - Summer (DST): UTC+2 (CEST)
- Postal code: 71035
- Dialing code: 0881
- Patron saint: St. John
- Saint day: 24 June
- Website: Official website

Celenza Valfortore (Pugliese: Celénze) is a town and comune in the province of Foggia in the Apulia region of southeast Italy.

== Main sights ==
- Church of Santa Croce
- Porta Nova
- Gambacorta Castle (15th and 16th centuries)

== Demographics ==
The population has been constantly shrinking in recent years. A massive emigration occurred during and after the Second World War. Numerous inhabitants moved to countries such as Argentina, the United States, and Australia.

== Economy ==
Agriculture used to employ the major part of the labour force. Cattle and farming were the main activities, although in the last years this has been changing, with the tertiary sector employing 41 percent of the working force.

== Climate ==
Winters are cold, influenced by the Apennines, with occasional snowfalls taking place between the months of November and March.

Summers are extremely dry and hot. Almost no rainfall occurs between June and August.
