= Ischitella =

- Comune
- Comune di Ischitella
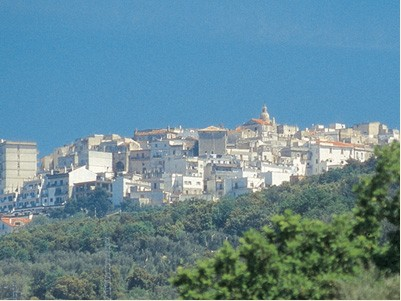
- View of Ischitella

- Location within Italy Location within Apulia
- Coordinates: 41°54′N 15°54′E
- Country: Italy
- Region: Apulia
- Province: Foggia (FG)
- Frazioni: Foce Varano

Government
  - Mayor: Carlo Guerra

Area
  - Total: 85.46 km^{2} (33.00 sq mi)
- Elevation: 310 m (1,020 ft)

Population (28 February 2017)
  - Total: 4,405
  - Density: 51.54/km^{2} (133.5/sq mi)
- Demonym: Ischitellani
- Time zone: UTC+1 (CET)
  - Summer (DST): UTC+2 (CEST)
- Postal code: 71010
- Dialing code: 0884
- Patron saint: Saint Eustace
- Saint day: 20 May
- Website: Official website

Ischitella (Foggiano: Schetédde) is a town and comune in the province of Foggia, Apulia, southeast Italy. It is a centre for agrumes production, on the northern slopes of the Gargano promontory.

== Main sights ==
- The castle, now a private palace, built in the 12th century and remade in the 17th century
- Church of St. Eustace (18th century)
- Abbey of San Pietro in Cuppis, located outside the town, in Byzantine-Romanesque style. Known since as early as 1058, it is now in decaying state.

== Twin towns ==
- Settimo Torinese, Italy, since 2006
