= Rocchetta Sant'Antonio =

- Comune
- Comune di Rocchetta Sant'Antonio
- Coat of arms

- Location within Italy Location within Apulia
- Coordinates: 41°6′N 15°28′E
- Country: Italy
- Region: Apulia
- Province: Foggia (FG)
- Frazioni: Candela, Lacedonia (AV), Melfi (PZ), Sant'Agata di Puglia

Government
  - Mayor: Ranieri Castelli

Area
  - Total: 71.90 km^{2} (27.76 sq mi)
- Elevation: 630 m (2,070 ft)

Population (31 December 2010)
  - Total: 1,982
  - Density: 27.57/km^{2} (71.40/sq mi)
- Demonym: Rocchetani
- Time zone: UTC+1 (CET)
  - Summer (DST): UTC+2 (CEST)
- Postal code: 71020
- Dialing code: 0885
- ISTAT code: 071042
- Patron saint: St. Antony the Great
- Saint day: 17 January
- Website: Official website

Rocchetta Sant'Antonio (Foggiano: La Rocca or La Ròcche) is a town and comune in the province of Foggia in the Apulia region of southeast Italy. It was part of the province of Avellino until 1940.
