= Chieuti =

Chieuti Qefti
- Comune
- Comune di Chieuti
- Location within Italy Location within Apulia
- Coordinates: 41°51′N 15°9′E
- Country: Italy
- Region: Apulia
- Province: Foggia (FG)

Government
  - Mayor: Lucia Antonietta Dardes

Area
  - Total: 60.91 km^{2} (23.52 sq mi)
- Elevation: 221 m (725 ft)

Population (31 December 2010)
  - Total: 1,772
  - Density: 29.09/km^{2} (75.35/sq mi)
- Demonym: Chieutini
- Time zone: UTC+1 (CET)
  - Summer (DST): UTC+2 (CEST)
- Postal code: 71010
- Dialing code: 0882
- Patron saint: St. George
- Saint day: 23 April

Chieuti (Arbëreshë Albanian: Qefti) is an Arbëreshë town and comune in the province of Foggia in the Apulia region of southeast Italy.
