= Pietramontecorvino =

- Comune
- Comune di Pietramontecorvino
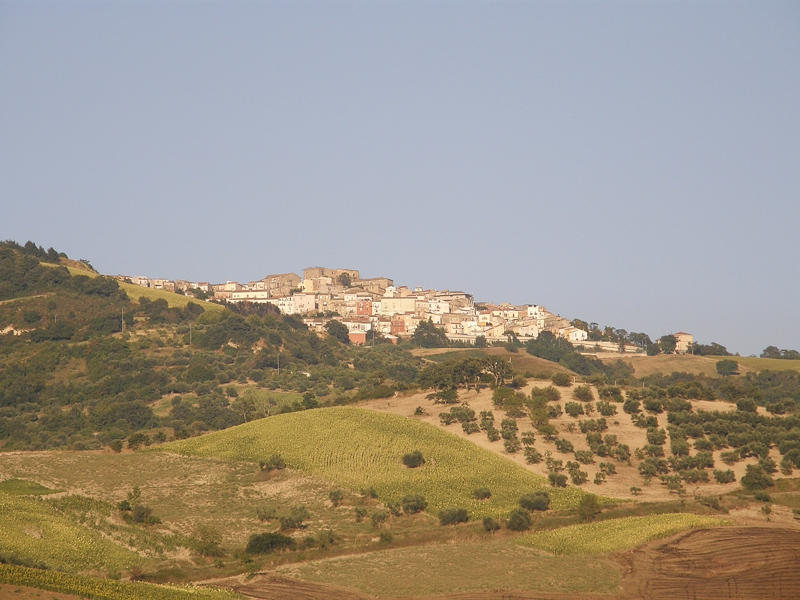
- View of Pietramontecorvino

- Coat of arms

- Location within Italy Location within Apulia
- Coordinates: 41°33′N 15°08′E
- Country: Italy
- Region: Apulia
- Province: Foggia (FG)

Government
  - Mayor: Domenico Zuppa

Area
  - Total: 71.65 km^{2} (27.66 sq mi)
- Elevation: 456 m (1,496 ft)

Population (28 February 2017)
  - Total: 2,698
  - Density: 37.66/km^{2} (97.53/sq mi)
- Demonym: Petraioli
- Time zone: UTC+1 (CET)
  - Summer (DST): UTC+2 (CEST)
- Postal code: 71038
- Dialing code: 0881
- Patron saint: St. Albert of Montecorvino
- Saint day: May 16
- Website: Official website

Pietramontecorvino (Petraiolo: Préte) is a town and comune in the province of Foggia in the Apulia region of southeast Italy. It is located in the Monti Dauni, on a rocky spur commanding the valley of the Triolo, a right tributary of the Candelaro river. It is one of I Borghi più belli d'Italia ("The most beautiful villages of Italy").

== Main sights ==
- Norman Tower, a remain of the medieval fortifications
- Church of Santa Maria Assunta (perhaps built in the late 12th century). It was modified in the 16th and 18th centuries.
- Ducal Palace
