= San Ferdinando di Puglia =

- Comune
- Comune di San Ferdinando di Puglia
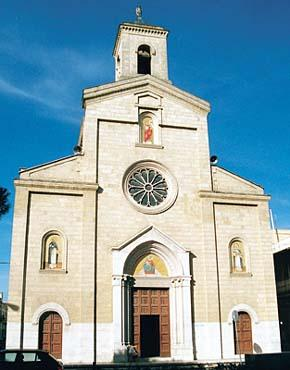
- Parish of Santa Maria del Rosario

- Coat of arms

- Location within Italy Location within Apulia
- Coordinates: 41°18′N 16°04′E
- Country: Italy
- Region: Apulia
- Province: Province of Barletta-Andria-Trani (BT)

Government
  - Mayor: Salvatore Puttilli

Area
  - Total: 41.23 km^{2} (15.92 sq mi)
- Elevation: 64 m (210 ft)

Population (28 February 2017)
  - Total: 13,915
  - Density: 337.5/km^{2} (874.1/sq mi)
- Demonym: Sanferdinandesi
- Time zone: UTC+1 (CET)
  - Summer (DST): UTC+2 (CEST)
- Postal code: 71046
- Dialing code: 0883
- Patron saint: Ferdinand III of Castile
- Saint day: May 30
- Website: Official website

San Ferdinando di Puglia is a town and comune in the Province of Barletta-Andria-Trani in the Apulia region of southeast Italy.

== Twin towns ==
- Lariano, Italy
- Carapelle, Italy
