= San Marco in Lamis =

San Marco in Lamis Sandə Marchə (Neapolitan)
- Comune
- Comune di San Marco in Lamis
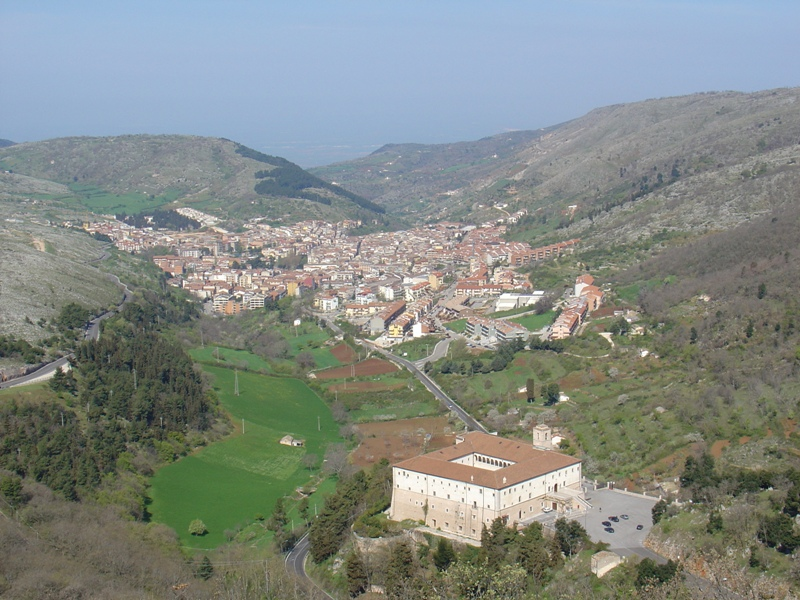
- View of San Marco in Lamis

- Location within Italy Location within Apulia
- Coordinates: 41°43′N 15°38′E
- Country: Italy
- Region: Apulia
- Province: Foggia (FG)
- Frazioni: Borgo Celano

Government
  - Mayor: Michele Soccio

Area
  - Total: 232.82 km^{2} (89.89 sq mi)
- Elevation: 550 m (1,800 ft)

Population (31 December 2017)
  - Total: 13,583
  - Density: 58.341/km^{2} (151.10/sq mi)
- Demonym: Sammarchesi
- Time zone: UTC+1 (CET)
  - Summer (DST): UTC+2 (CEST)
- Postal code: 71014
- Dialing code: 0882
- Patron saint: St. Mark the Evangelist
- Saint day: April 25
- Website: Official website

San Marco in Lamis (Sammarchese: Sandə Marchə [ˈsændə ˈmærkə]) is a town and comune in the province of Foggia in the Apulia region of southeast Italy. It is located in the Gargano massif area within the Parco Nazionale del Gargano and it belongs to the Comunità Montana del Gargano. Part of the Via Sacra Langobardorum runs through the town's territory. As such, the town is home to the Santuario di Santa Maria di Stignano and the Convento di San Matteo apostolo. The Santuario di Santa Maria di Stignano is linked to the Castelpagano Castle, whose ruins dominate a slope in the territory of Apricena.

== Religious rituals ==
The town is known for the tradition of the 'Le Fracchie', a traditional celebration occurring each Good Friday whereby horizontal torches weighing tons are piled on small wagons, set on fire and paraded around the town. Popular tradition connects this ritual to the lighting of roads in order to help the mother of Jesus in the search of her son's body. As such it can be considered to be part of fire rituals. Just like other towns in the Gargano promontory, the cult of the Archangel Michael is very much rooted in the town's culture as witnessed by kids dressing as the Archangel Michael during processions. The Archangel is also thought to protect the mountain against earthquakes: "Santə Məchelə fa lu uardianə intə li gruttə də Montə e accuscì intə pə intə tè abbada tuttə li gruttə e non li fà anchi də demonjə e non fa succedə li tremutə", "Saint Michael guards the grottoes of Monte Sant'Angelo, he controls all the grottoes and guards their interior, he prevents them from becoming full of demons and prevents earthquakes from happening". Pilgrimages to the grotto of Saint Michael in Monte Sant'Angelo take the route of the Via Sacra Langobardorum. As such, pilgrims walk through the town of San Marco in Lamis with the Convento of San Matteo Apostolo being one of the places hosting pilgrims during their stops.

== Language ==
The inhabitants of the town speak an Italoromance language, belonging to Southern Italian dialects, which they refer to as Sandəmarchesə. The term dialect, however, is not used with the meaning of variety of the Italian language, but refers to linguistic systems independent from Italian, i.e., languages. Both Italian and Southern Italian languages are in fact daughter languages of Latin, with the exception of non-Romance ones, such as Arbëresh, by instance.

=== Phonetics and phonology ===
As many languages of Southern Italy, Sandəmarchesə makes an extensive use of the schwa:

dəmonjə	aggəsənatə
demon	wasted

The schwa can occur both word-internally and at the end of a word. The final-word schwa can represent gender-neutral plural morphology:

scol-a	scol-ə
school-f.sg	school-pl

On the other hand, it can also represent masculine singular morphology. Endings for masculine singular and for the plural are thus often syncretic:

n-u trattur-ə	dujə trattur-ə
one-m.sg countryside.road-m.sg	two.m.sg countryside.road-pl

Metaphony plays an important role in the language in that it can specify gender distinctions:

uagliolə	uagliulə
boy.sg	boy.pl

The language employs phono-syntactic doubling for word-initial consonants following a vowel.

=== Syntax ===
Sandəmarchesə is a SVO language. Adjectives always follow their head noun, except for quality ones (beautiful, big, etc.) The language employs two sets of possessives. For non-kinship nouns, the possessive is a post-nominal free element. For kinship nouns, possessives are of the enclitic type. As in other languages, kinship nouns are not articled.

figghiə-ta	la machəna toa
daughter-your.f.sg	the car your.f

Possession can be realized with two different constructions. One is prepositional, the other one is aprepositional. The difference between the two lies in the definiteness features of the nouns:

Prepositional	Non-prepositional
la koda dəllu kanə	la koda lu kanə
the tail of.the dog	the tail the dog
'the tail of the dog'	'the tail of the dog'

Other languages of Southern Italy, such as Calabrian varieties, make use of the non-prepositional construction.

== Twin towns ==
- Accadia, Italy
