= Lago di Varano =

Lake in Italy

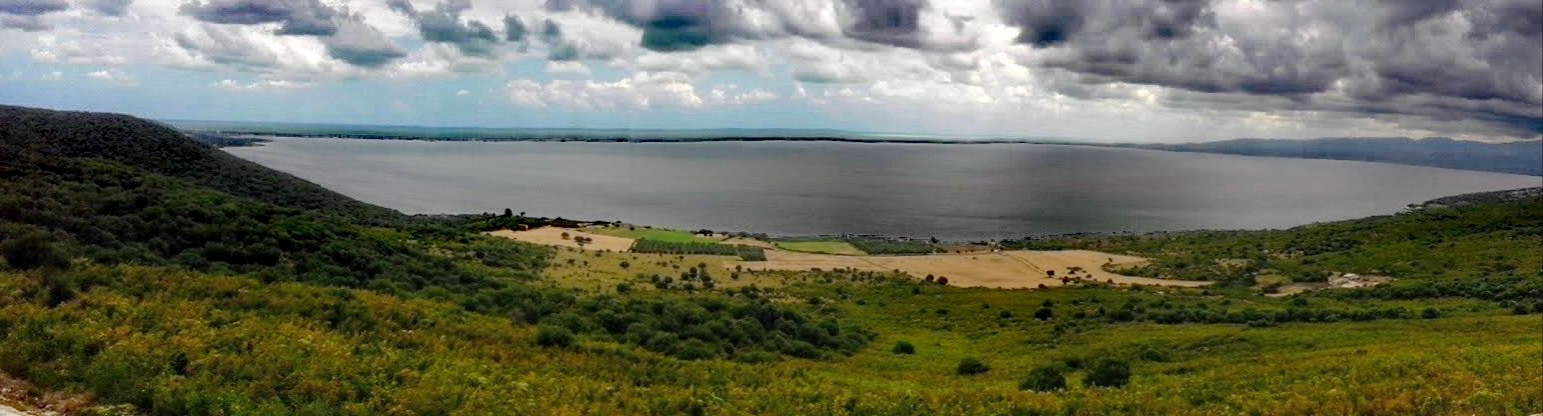

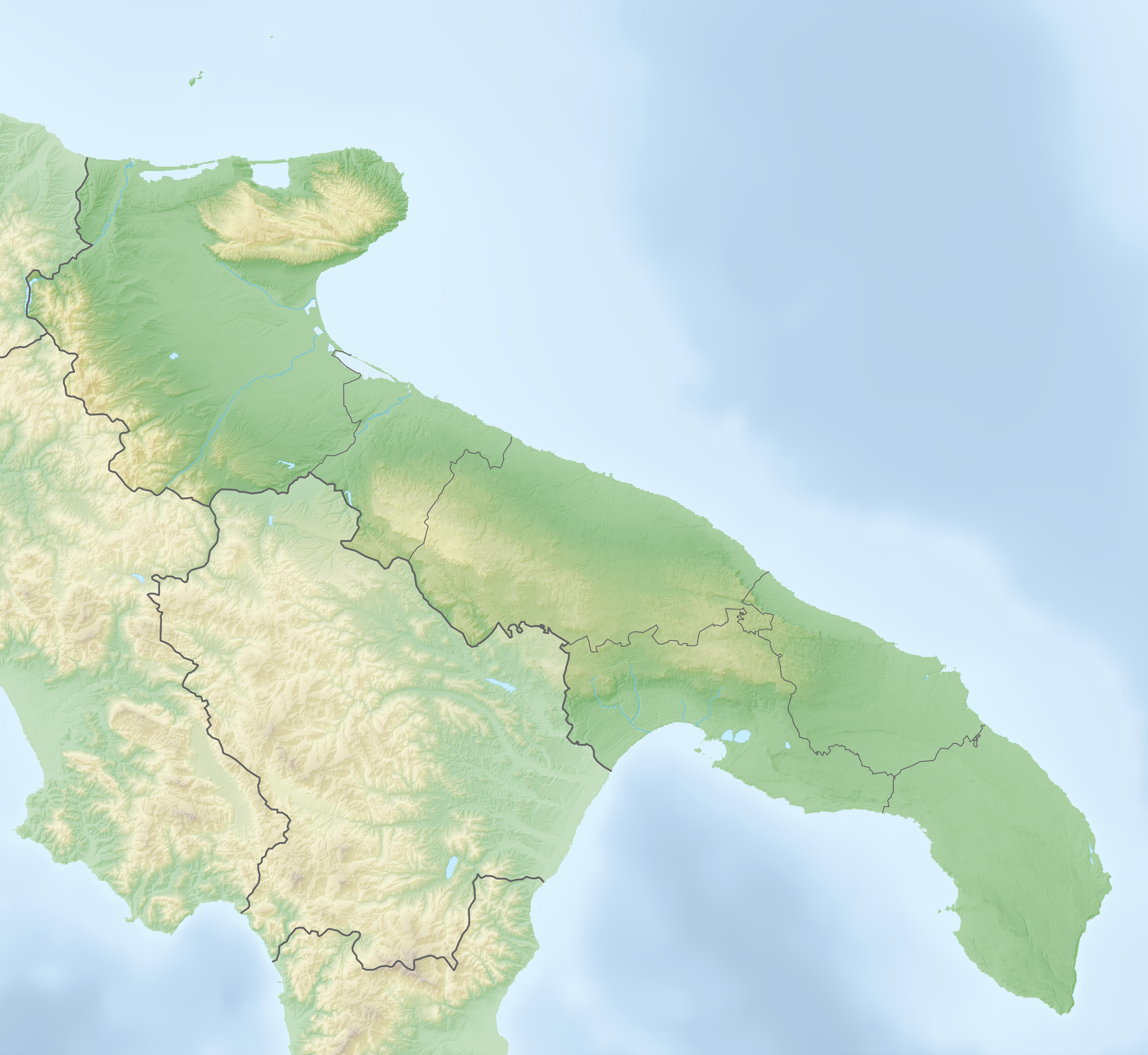
- Location within Apulia
- Location: Province of Foggia, Apulia
- Coordinates: 41°52′45″N 15°44′46″E
- Catchment area: 300 km^{2} (120 sq mi)
- Basin countries: Italy
- Max. length: 10 km (6.2 mi)
- Max. width: 7 km (4.3 mi)
- Surface area: 65 km^{2} (25 sq mi)
- Average depth: 4 m (13 ft)
- Max. depth: 6 m (20 ft)
- Residence time: 1.5-3 years

Lago di Varano is a salt lake (or lagoon) in the Province of Foggia, Apulia, Italy. It is the largest coastal lake in Italy, and the seventh-largest (by area) in the country.

== Geography ==
Lago di Varano is located along the coast of the Gargano peninsula. Different sources report contradictory surface areas for the lake, ranging between 51 km^{2} (20 sq mi) and 65 km^{2} (25 sq mi). It is located approximately 10 kilometres (6.2 mi) east of Lake Lesina, another large salt lake/lagoon along the Adriatic coast.

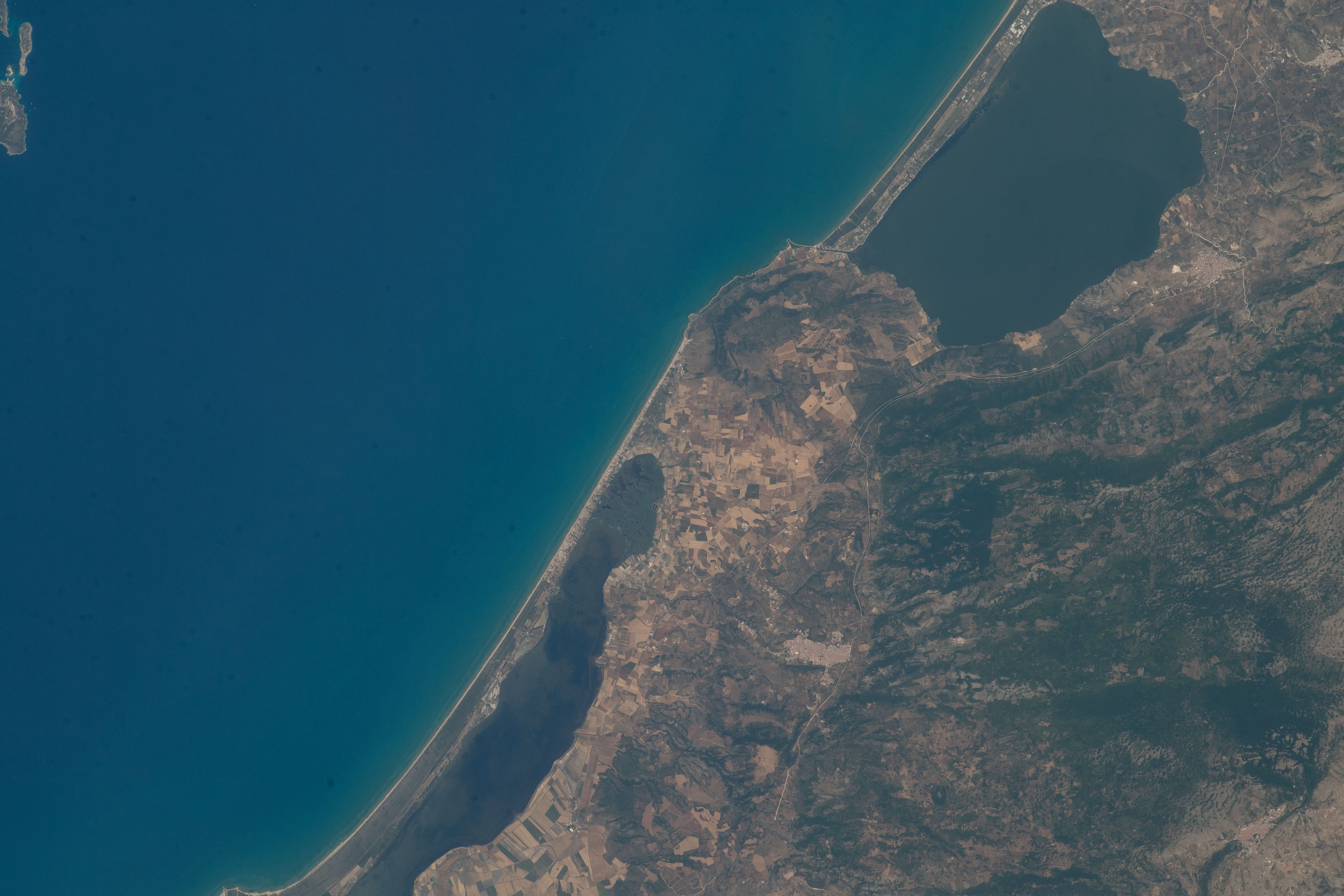
Satellite view of the Lago di Varano (top right), with neighboring Lake Lesina at the bottom-left. North is to the top-left of the picture. The Tremiti Islands are barely visible off-shore to the north of the lagoon.

The water is saline/brackish, fed by salt water from two channels connecting to the adjacent Adriatic Sea and fresh water from a few rivers. Its geographic form has changed over time; Strabo and Pliny the Elder refer to the lake as an gulf of the Adriatic Sea, before a barrier island formed and converted the gulf into a lagoon. It was still a navigable harbor at the time of the Crusades.

== Human use ==
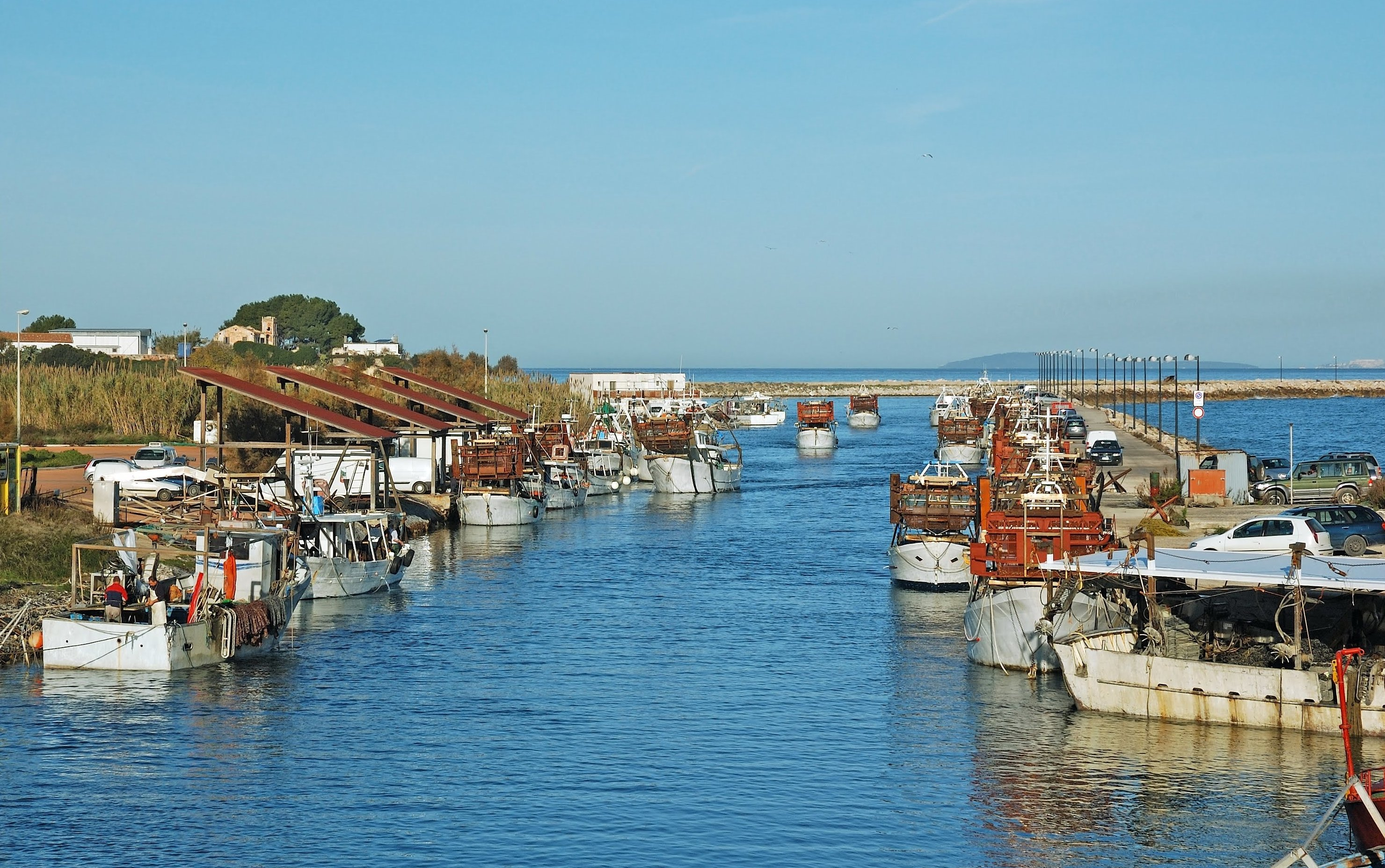
Foce di Capoiale, one of the two surface connections between the waters of the lagoon and the sea

The shores of the lake are only lightly developed. Mussel farming takes place in the lagoon, with several thousand tons of mussels harvested annually. The Isola di Varano, the island that separates the lagoon from the sea, is home to a nature reserve on its seaward side. The entire lake and barrier island are also part of a Special Protection Zone with the nearby Lake Lesina. The invasive red swamp crayfish, originally from North America, has been found in the lake as part of its spread through Italy.

The lake is the subject of a local legend, an example of a flood myth. In the legend, the lake was originally the site of a corrupt town, called Uria, that was flooded and destroyed by God as a punishment. A pious sole survivor and her house were the only things to survive the flood.
