= Cagnano Varano =

- Comune
- Comune di Cagnano Varano
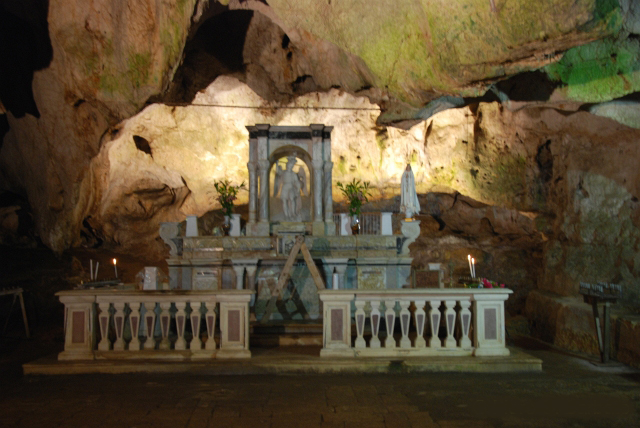
- The Altar of St Michael the Archangel, in the grotto named after him

- Coat of arms

- Location within Italy Location within Apulia
- Coordinates: 41°50′N 15°46′E
- Country: Italy
- Region: Apulia
- Province: Foggia (FG)
- Frazioni: Porto di Capojale, Bagno di Varano, San Nicola Imbuti

Government
  - Mayor: Claudio Costanzucci

Area
  - Total: 166.84 km^{2} (64.42 sq mi)
- Elevation: 175 m (574 ft)

Population (28 February 2017)
  - Total: 7,266
  - Density: 43.55/km^{2} (112.8/sq mi)
- Demonym: Cagnanesi
- Time zone: UTC+1 (CET)
  - Summer (DST): UTC+2 (CEST)
- Postal code: 71010
- Dialing code: 0884
- Patron saint: Michael the Archangel, Catald
- Saint day: 8 May, 10 May
- Website: Official website

Cagnano Varano (Pugliese: Cagnano) is a town and comune in the province of Foggia in the Apulia region of southeast Italy. It occupies a commanding position above the Lago di Varano, and is part of the Gargano National Park. The economy is mostly based on agriculture, fishing and tourism.

Sights include the karstic grotto of San Michele, which has been frequented since the Old Stone Age. It is now consecrated as a Roman Catholic chapel.
