= Castelluccio dei Sauri =

- Comune
- Comune di Castelluccio dei Sauri
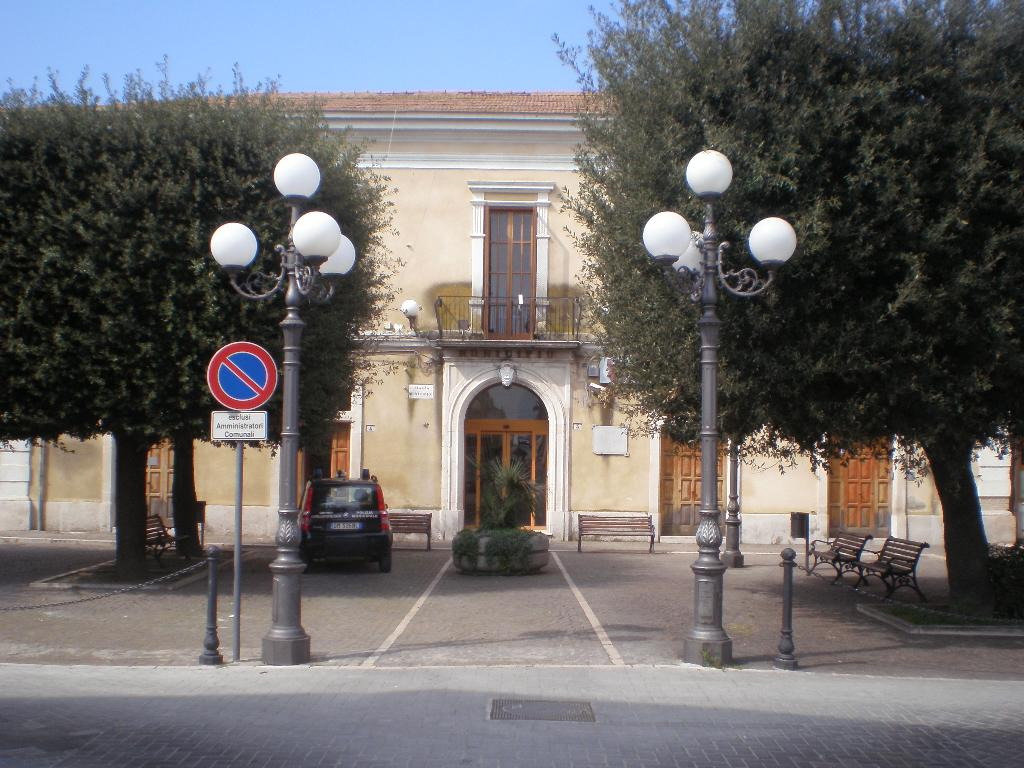
- Town hall.

- Coat of arms

- Location within Italy Location within Apulia
- Coordinates: 41°18′N 15°29′E
- Country: Italy
- Region: Apulia
- Province: Foggia (FG)

Government
  - Mayor: Antonio del Priore

Area
  - Total: 51.47 km^{2} (19.87 sq mi)
- Elevation: 284 m (932 ft)

Population (28 February 2017)
  - Total: 2,097
  - Density: 40.74/km^{2} (105.5/sq mi)
- Demonym: Castelluccesi
- Time zone: UTC+1 (CET)
  - Summer (DST): UTC+2 (CEST)
- Postal code: 71025
- Dialing code: 0881
- Website: Official website

Castelluccio dei Sauri (Foggiano: Castellùzze) is a comune in the province of Foggia in the Apulia region of southeast Italy. It was a historically Arbëreshë town.
