= Zapponeta =

- Comune
- Comune di Zapponeta
- Location within Italy Location within Apulia
- Coordinates: 41°27′N 15°57′E
- Country: Italy
- Region: Apulia
- Province: Foggia (FG)

Government
  - Mayor: Vincenzo D'Aloisio

Area
  - Total: 41.75 km^{2} (16.12 sq mi)
- Elevation: 10 m (33 ft)

Population (31 December 2015)
  - Total: 3,396
  - Density: 81.34/km^{2} (210.7/sq mi)
- Demonym: Zapponetani
- Time zone: UTC+1 (CET)
  - Summer (DST): UTC+2 (CEST)
- Postal code: 71030
- Dialing code: 0884
- Patron saint: Madonna della Misericordia
- Saint day: September 12
- Website: Official website

Zapponeta (Pugliese: Zappunòte) is a town and comune in the province of Foggia in the Apulia region of southeast Italy. Until 1975 it was a frazione of Manfredonia. It was founded in 1768 by baron Michele Zezza.
