= Alberona =

- Comune
- Comune di Alberona
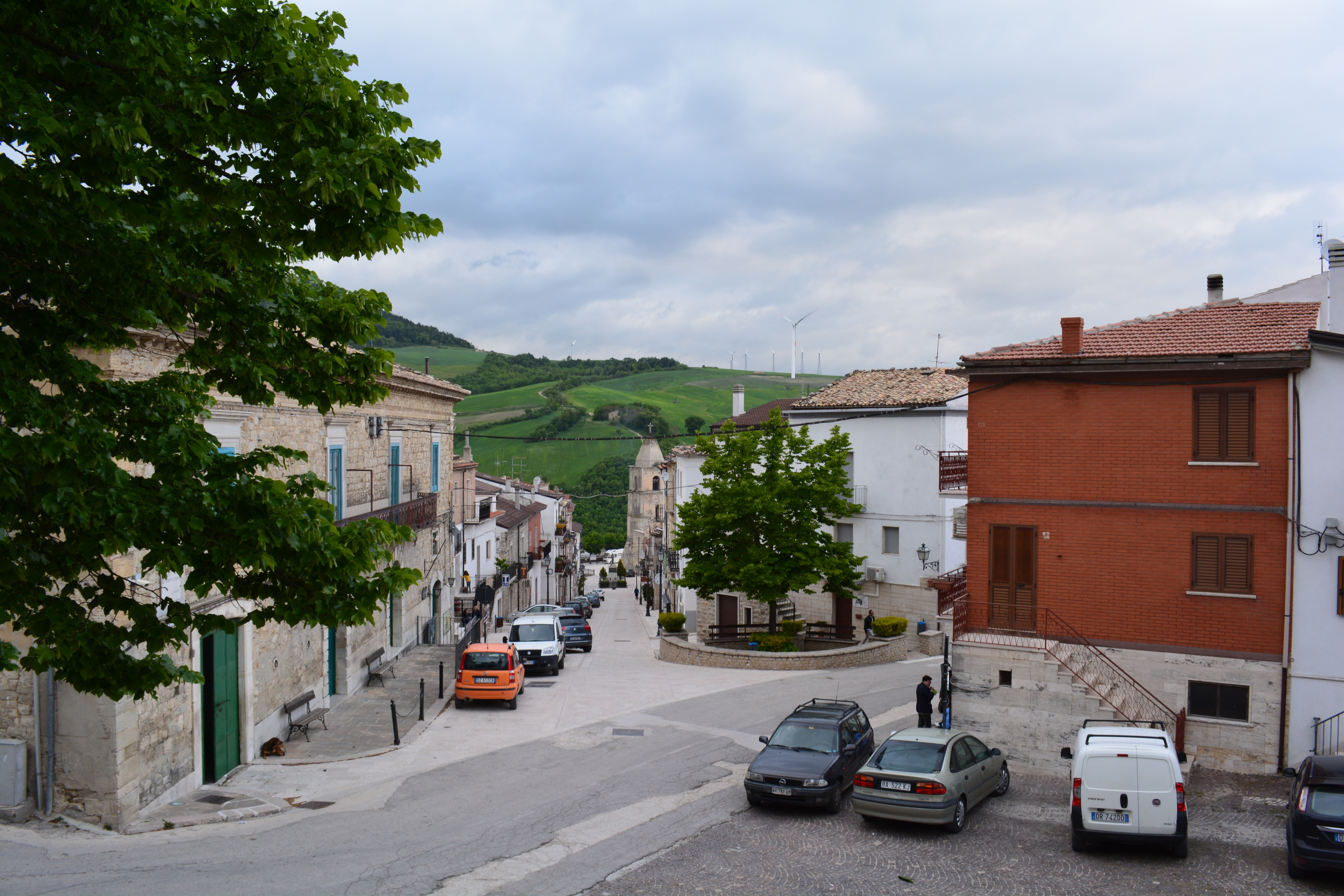
- View of Alberona

- Location within Italy Location within Apulia
- Coordinates: 41°26′N 15°7′E
- Country: Italy
- Region: Apulia
- Province: Foggia (FG)

Government
  - Mayor: Leonardo De Matthaeis

Area
  - Total: 49.75 km^{2} (19.21 sq mi)
- Elevation: 732 m (2,402 ft)

Population (1 January 2019)
  - Total: 925
  - Density: 18.6/km^{2} (48.2/sq mi)
- Demonym: Alberonese(i)
- Time zone: UTC+1 (CET)
  - Summer (DST): UTC+2 (CEST)
- Postal code: 71031
- Dialing code: 0881
- Patron saint: John the Baptist
- Saint day: 30 August
- Website: Official website

Alberona (Pugliese: Areveròne) is an upland village and comune of the province of Foggia and region of Apulia, in southeast Italy. It is one of I Borghi più belli d'Italia ("The most beautiful villages of Italy").
