= Poggio Imperiale =

- Comune
- Comune di Poggio Imperiale
- Coat of arms

- Location within Italy Location within Apulia
- Coordinates: 41°28′N 15°34′E
- Country: Italy
- Region: Apulia
- Province: Foggia (FG)

Government
  - Mayor: Alfonso D'Aloiso

Area
  - Total: 52.88 km^{2} (20.42 sq mi)
- Elevation: 75 m (246 ft)

Population (31 March 2018)
  - Total: 2,677
  - Density: 50.62/km^{2} (131.1/sq mi)
- Demonym: Poggioimperialesi
- Time zone: UTC+1 (CET)
  - Summer (DST): UTC+2 (CEST)
- Postal code: 71010
- Dialing code: 0882
- Patron saint: St. Placidus Martyr
- Saint day: 5 October
- Website: Official website

Poggio Imperiale is a town and comune in the province of Foggia in the Apulia region of southeast Italy.

== Twin towns ==
- Vorë, Albania, since 2011
