= Province of Foggia =

Province of Italy

Coordinates: 41°28′N 15°34′E

Province of Foggia Provincia di Foggia (Italian) Provìnge de Fogge (Neapolitan)
- Province
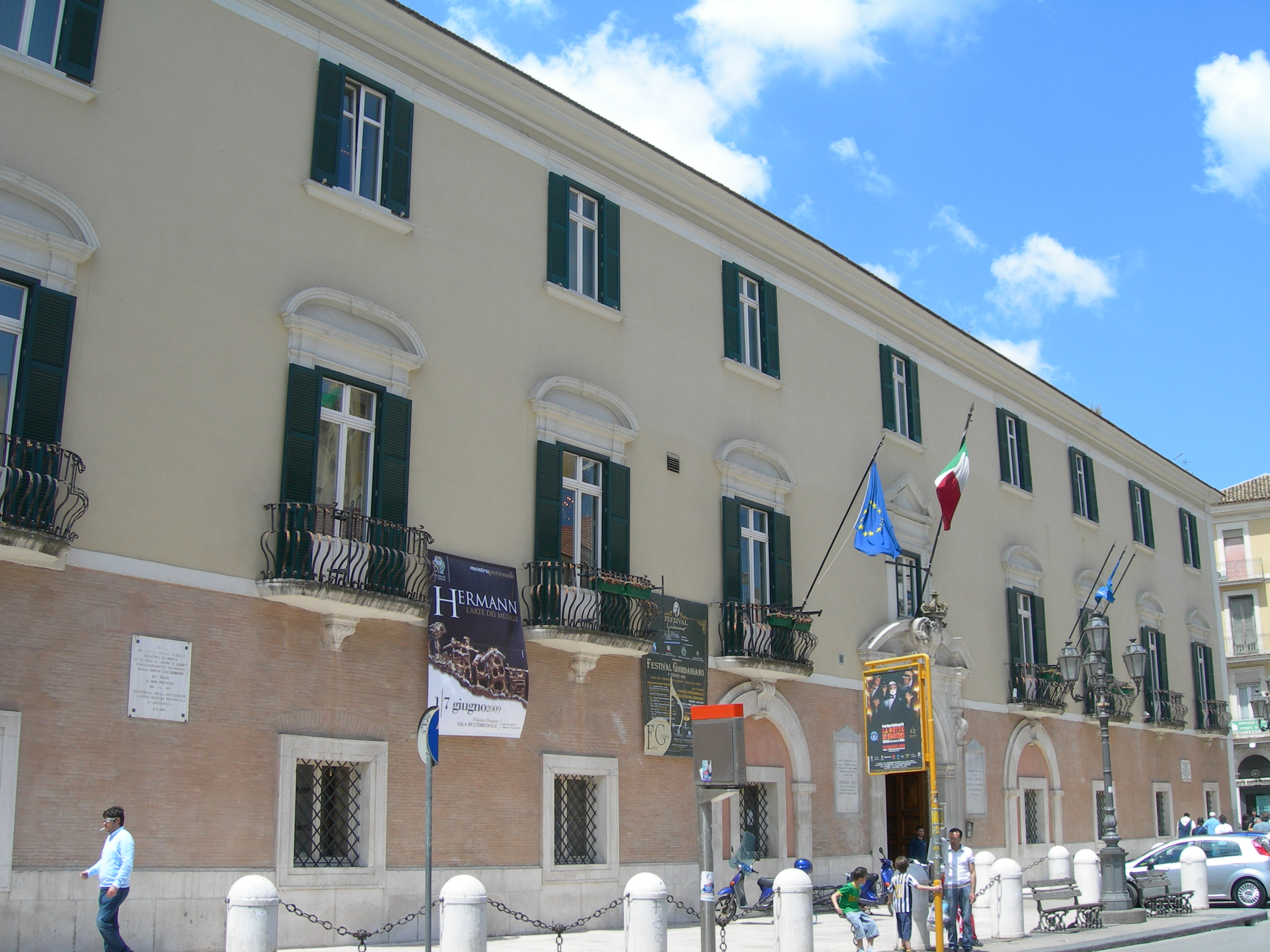
- Palazzo Dogana, the provincial seat

- Coat of arms

- Location of the province of Foggia in Italy
- Country: Italy
- Region: Apulia
- Capital(s): Foggia
- Municipalities: 61

Government
  - President: Giuseppe Nobiletti

Area
  - Total: 7,007.54 km^{2} (2,705.63 sq mi)

Population (2026)
  - Total: 587,785
  - Density: 83.8789/km^{2} (217.245/sq mi)

GDP
  - Total: €10.670 billion (2015)
  - Per capita: €16,874 (2015)
- Time zone: UTC+1 (CET)
  - Summer (DST): UTC+2 (CEST)
- Postal code: 71100
- Telephone prefix: 0881
- Vehicle registration: FG
- ISTAT code: 071

The Province of Foggia (Italian: provincia di Foggia, Italian: [proˈvintʃa di ˈfɔddʒa]; Neapolitan: Provìnge de Fogge) is a province in the region of Apulia in southern Italy. Its capital is the city of Foggia. It has a population of 587,785 in an area of 7,007.54 square kilometres (2,705.63 sq mi) across its 61 municipalities.

This province is also known as Daunia, after the Daunians, an Iapygian pre-Roman tribe living in Tavoliere plain, and as Capitanata, derived from Catapanata, since the area was governed by a catepan as part of the Catepanate of Italy during the High Middle Ages.

== Geography ==
The province of Foggia can be divided in three parts: one centered on its capital called Tavoliere, another along the Apennines named Daunian Mountains and the third on the spur of the boot-shaped Italian peninsula called Gargano.

The Tavoliere is an important agricultural area: grapefruit, olives, durum wheat and tomato are the chief products. It is called "the granary of Italy" because of its significant wheat production.

Daunian Mountains lie along the border with Molise and Campania. Scattered with small villages, the mountains are covered by forests and pastures, with the main produce being hams and caciocavallo cheese. Faetar, a language descended from Franco-Provençal, is spoken in two villages: Faeto and Celle di San Vito.

The Gargano peninsula is partially mountainous and partially forested, Foresta Umbra with vegetation typical of Central Europe, the only part of the ancient black forest remaining in Italy. Its name comes from the word ombra (shadow) because of its density that prevents light from entering. The coast of Gargano has many beaches and tourist facilities. In the north are two major salt lakes Lesina and Varano. It produces olives, olive oil and typical mountain and seafood items.

=== Municipalities ===
The province has 61 municipalities. In 2004, 3 municipalities of its previously 64 municipalities joined the newly-created Province of Barletta-Andria-Trani; Margherita di Savoia, San Ferdinando di Puglia and Trinitapoli.

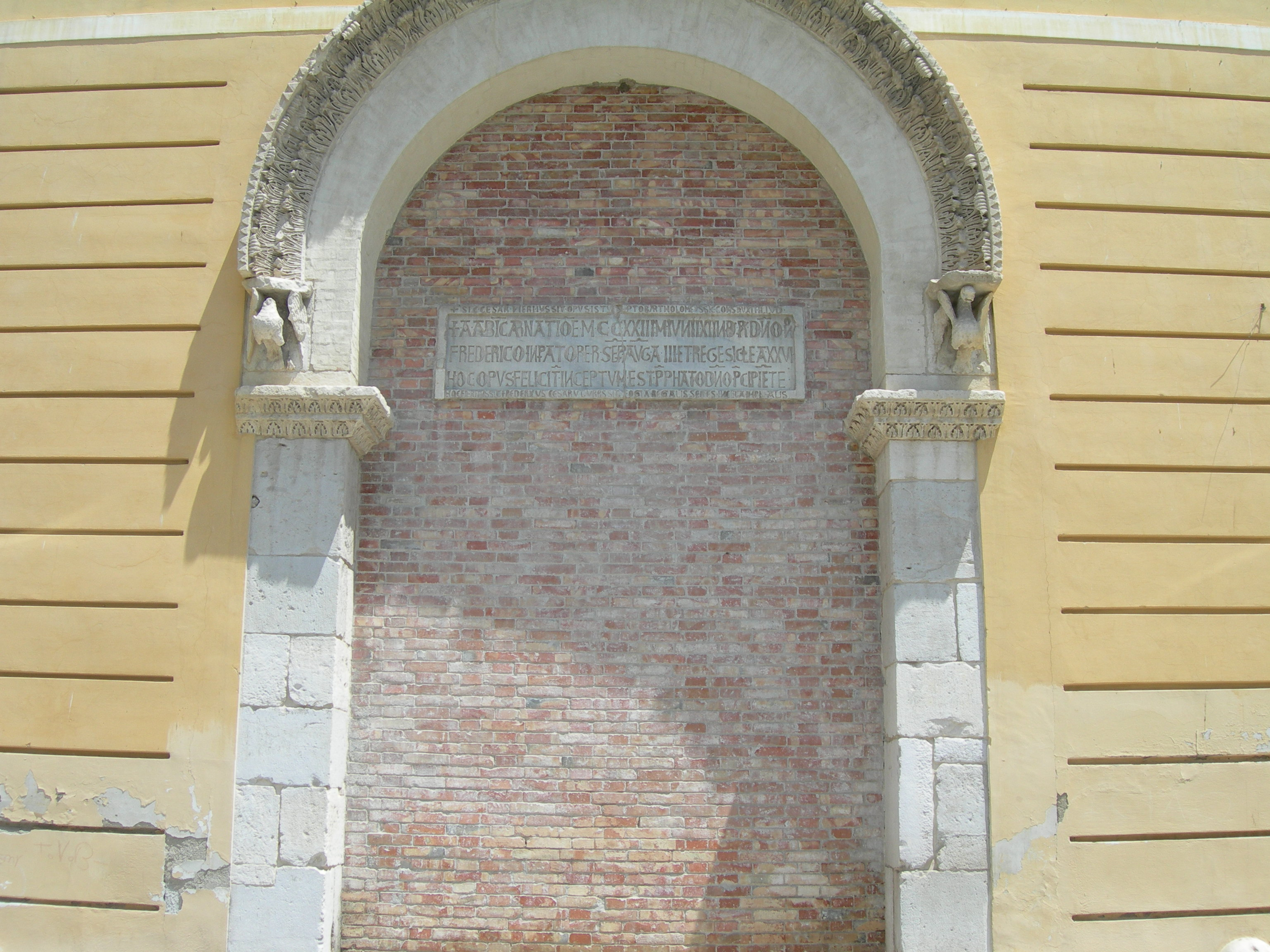
Foggia, entrance arch of the imperial palace of Frederick II

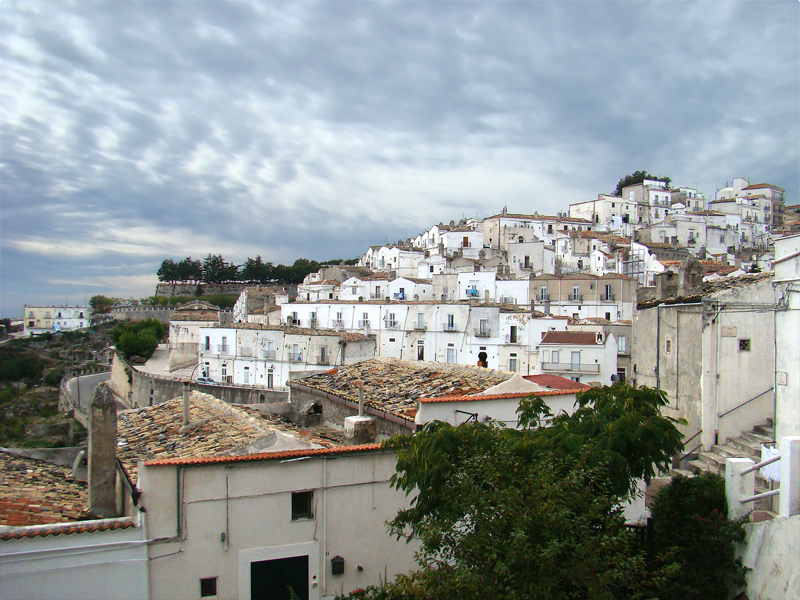
Monte Sant'Angelo

- Accadia
- Alberona
- Anzano di Puglia
- Apricena
- Ascoli Satriano
- Biccari
- Bovino
- Cagnano Varano
- Candela
- Carapelle
- Carlantino
- Carpino
- Casalnuovo Monterotaro
- Casalvecchio di Puglia
- Castelluccio dei Sauri
- Castelluccio Valmaggiore
- Castelnuovo della Daunia
- Celenza Valfortore
- Celle di San Vito
- Cerignola
- Chieuti
- Deliceto
- Faeto
- Foggia
- Ischitella
- Isole Tremiti
- Lesina
- Lucera
- Manfredonia
- Mattinata
- Monte Sant'Angelo
- Monteleone di Puglia
- Motta Montecorvino
- Ordona
- Orsara di Puglia
- Orta Nova
- Panni
- Peschici
- Pietramontecorvino
- Poggio Imperiale
- Rignano Garganico
- Rocchetta Sant'Antonio
- Rodi Garganico
- Roseto Valfortore
- San Giovanni Rotondo
- San Marco in Lamis
- San Marco la Catola
- San Nicandro Garganico
- San Paolo di Civitate
- San Severo
- Sant'Agata di Puglia
- Serracapriola
- Stornara
- Stornarella
- Torremaggiore
- Troia
- Vico del Gargano
- Vieste
- Volturara Appula
- Volturino
- Zapponeta

== Demographics ==
Historical population (current borders)
Year	Pop.	±%
1861	316,417	—
1871	325,484	+2.9%
1881	354,963	+9.1%
1901	419,079	+18.1%
1911	470,049	+12.2%
1921	459,598	−2.2%
1931	473,293	+3.0%
1936	493,896	+4.4%
1951	617,701	+25.1%
1961	623,891	+1.0%
1971	619,002	−0.8%
1981	643,827	+4.0%
1991	657,000	+2.0%
2001	649,598	−1.1%
2011	626,072	−3.6%
2021	599,028	−4.3%
Source: ISTAT

As of 2026, the population is 587,785, of which 49.7% are male, and 50.3% are female. Minors make up 15.1% of the population, and seniors make up 24.3%.

=== Immigration ===
As of 2025, immigrants make up 7.2% of the population. The 5 largest foreign countries of birth are Romania, Morocco, Germany, Bulgaria, and Albania.

== Economy ==
Although less important today, the agricultural sector remains the mainstay of Foggia's economy; it is nicknamed the "granary of Italy". The few industries present are mostly devoted to food processing.

Most peeled tomatoes in Europe come from Foggia. Every year, two million tons of tomatoes are produced but farmers receive only eight cents per kilo. To survive in the free market, most tomato farmers recruit illegal immigrants.

== Tourism ==
Foggia receives many Catholic pilgrims each year to locations such as the Sanctuary of Saint Michael the Archangel in Monte Sant'Angelo, which was visited by Pope John Paul II in 1987, and to nearby San Giovanni Rotondo, the home of Saint Pio of Pietrelcina from 1916 until his death in 1968. As the number of pilgrims to San Giovanni Rotondo kept increasing over the years, in 2004 a new shrine near the church was built. The sanctuary has a capacity of around 6,000 people and its parvis has a 30,000 people capacity.

== See also ==
- Daunia – historical region and people in the 7th to 5th centuries BC in the present-day province of Foggia
