= Stornarella =

- Comune
- Comune di Stornarella
- Location within Italy Location within Apulia
- Coordinates: 41°15′N 15°44′E
- Country: Italy
- Region: Apulia
- Province: Foggia (FG)

Government
  - Mayor: Massimo Colia

Area
  - Total: 33.81 km^{2} (13.05 sq mi)
- Elevation: 154 m (505 ft)

Population (31 August 2015)
  - Total: 5,360
  - Density: 159/km^{2} (411/sq mi)
- Demonym: Stornarellesi
- Time zone: UTC+1 (CET)
  - Summer (DST): UTC+2 (CEST)
- Postal code: 71048
- Dialing code: 0885
- Patron saint: San Francesco da Paola & Madonna della Stella
- Saint day: 2 April
- Website: Official website

Stornarella (Foggiano: Sturnarédde) is a town and comune in the province of Foggia in the Apulia region the southeast of Italy.
