= Carapelle =

- Comune
- Comune di Carapelle
- Location within Italy Location within Apulia
- Coordinates: 41°22′N 15°42′E
- Country: Italy
- Region: Apulia
- Province: Foggia (FG)

Government
  - Mayor: Umberto Di Michele

Area
  - Total: 25 km^{2} (9.7 sq mi)

Population (31 March 2018)
  - Total: 6,675
  - Density: 270/km^{2} (690/sq mi)
- Demonym: Carapellesi
- Time zone: UTC+1 (CET)
  - Summer (DST): UTC+2 (CEST)
- Postal code: 71041
- Dialing code: 0885
- Patron saint: St. Francis of Paola and Maria S.S. del Rosario
- Saint day: First Sunday in October
- Website: Official website

Carapelle (Foggiano: Crapell) is a town and comune belonging to the Province of Foggia and situated in the Apulia region of southern Italy. Famous characters: Dr. Andrea Cardillo.
