= Orta Nova =

- Comune
- Comune di Orta Nova
- Location within Italy Location within Apulia
- Coordinates: 41°19′51″N 15°42′41″E
- Country: Italy
- Region: Apulia
- Province: Foggia (FG)

Government
  - Mayor: Domenico di Vito

Area
  - Total: 103 km^{2} (40 sq mi)
- Elevation: 70 m (230 ft)

Population (31 July 2015)
  - Total: 17,793
  - Density: 173/km^{2} (447/sq mi)
- Demonym: Ortesi
- Time zone: UTC+1 (CET)
  - Summer (DST): UTC+2 (CEST)
- Postal code: 71045
- Dialing code: 0885
- Patron saint: St. Anthony of Padua
- Saint day: June 13
- Website: Official website

Orta Nova is a town and comune about 25.4 kilometres (15.8 mi) from Foggia, in the region of Apulia, in southern Italy. It stretches to the southern part of the Tavoliere (Foggia's plain) on the right bank of the river Carapelle.

The origins of the name "Orta" are rather uncertain, as it the word may indicate: "crooked born", from the Latin ortus, or "garden" from the Latin word hortus, or also simply "East".

== History ==
The Romans built a courier post in the area, previously a territory of the Daunians.

In the early Middle Ages, a hamlet, whose name is mentioned in a document dating back to 1184, was built on the ruins of the Roman post. This hamlet came under the control of the Benedictine abbey of Venosa.

Under the Norman rule the Palace of Orta had its Concergius—a knight noted for his war capabilities—charged with guarding a castle or palace. In 1269 Pietro Galesio became Contergius, followed Raolino Normando followed. With the arrival of Henry VI of Hohenstaufen, Orta and its hamlet were part of a territorial defending plan as some documents attest.

Instead of the hamlet, a castrum was built under Hanry's son, Frederick II, a sort of little country villa used for recreation. Here he had a castle built where he could hunt in the wood in its neighbourhood.

In 1271, after the Angevine conquest of southern Italy, renovations were started by a royal "carpentier", Jean de Toul. In 1282 the castle of Orta, together with other five in the area, is attested to be directly managed by the royal court.

From the 14th century until the Aragonese conquest a darken epoch follows, in which the first conflicts started with the local pasture of the Teutonic Knights and continued having bad harvest and epidemic dating back to 1348, when the local province — also called "Capitanata" or "Daunia" — was struck by the Black Death that reduced the number of inhabitants by 35%.

The Fiefdom of Orta was purchased by the Jesuits of the Roman College in 1611; they also purchased the fiefdom of Stornara, the property of Ordona and the feudal farms of Stornara and Carapelle. The Jesuits were expelled from the Kingdom of Naples in 1767 with the seizure of the lands of Orta Nova and the close territories of Ordona (Herdoniae), Stornara, Stornarella and Carapelle; they were switched by the Royal Household, whence the name of "5 Royal Lands" (the 5 Reali Siti) or five agricultural colonies.

With the abolition of feudalism in 1808, Orta became an independent town with Ordona and Carapelle, and, after Italy's unification, in 1863 it received the name of Nova, to distinguish it from two similar-named Italian towns (Orta San Giulio and Orta di Atella).

== Orta Nova DOC ==
The area around Orta Nova is permitted to produce red and rose Italian DOC wine. The grapes are limited to a harvest yield of 15 tonnes/ha with the finished red wines need a minimum alcohol level of 12% and the roses needing at least 11.5% alcohol. The wines are predominantly composed of at least 60% Sangiovese with up to 40% of a blend of Uva di Troia, Montepulciano, Lambrusco Maestri and Trebbiano. However, Lambrusco and Trebbiano are further limited to each comprising no more than 10% of the blend.

== Main sights ==
- Chiesa Madre della Beata Vergine Maria Addolorata
- Palazzo Campese

The ex-Jesuit convent (1611) and the tower on its top, the Tower of the Lazeret (Torre del Lazzaretto) are also historically interesting.

There are also some archeological sites and some Roman settlements.

== Economy ==
The area of Orta Nova is intensively given over to agriculture, except some wine-producing households.

The agricultural productions include wheat, dessert grapes, olive oil, artichokes and other vegetables. Because of a somewhat homogeneous development on the local territory, it has been subject, during the years, to emigration which halted the economic growth.
