= Apricena =

- Comune
- Comune di Apricena
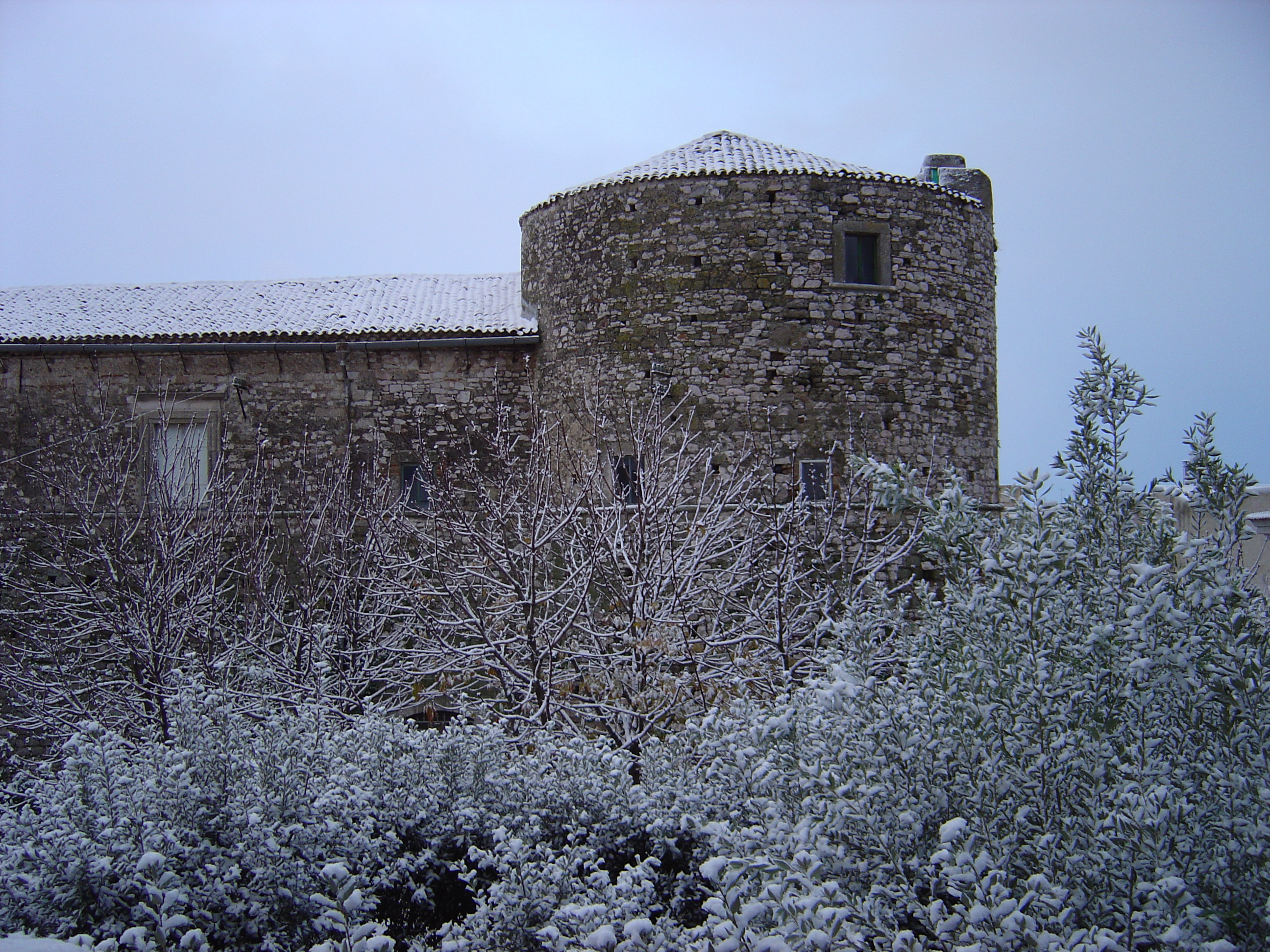
- The Castle of Apricena.

- Coat of arms

- Location of Apricena in Italy Apricena (Apulia)
- Coordinates: 41°46′N 15°26′E
- Country: Italy
- Region: Apulia
- Province: Foggia (FG)

Government
  - Mayor: Antonio Potenza

Area
  - Total: 172.51 km^{2} (66.61 sq mi)
- Elevation: 73 m (240 ft)

Population (30 April 2017)
  - Total: 13,246
  - Density: 76.784/km^{2} (198.87/sq mi)
- Demonym: Apricenesi
- Time zone: UTC+1 (CET)
  - Summer (DST): UTC+2 (CEST)
- Postal code: 71011
- Dialing code: 0882
- Patron saint: Crowned Mary
- Saint day: Last Sunday in May
- Website: Official website

Apricena (Foggiano: La Prucìne) is an Apulian town in the province of Foggia. It is 42 kilometres (26 mi) from its provincial capital, Foggia, Italy and a few kilometres inland from the Adriatic Sea.

This territory is mainly plain, cultivated with olives, cereals and wine. The economy is focused on quarrying the local rock, the Stone of Apricena, and exporting it to Germany, Japan, and China.

== History ==
Apricena developed from the summer residence of the Emperor Frederick II.

== Main sights ==
- Baronial Palace (Palazzo baroniale, commonly known as Torriolo)
- The clocktower (Torre dell'orologio)
- Mother Church of St. Martin and Lucy
- The abandoned Monastery of San Giovanni in Piano, where Pope Celestine V fled after renouncing his papacy.
- The ruins of Frederick II's castle, at Castelpagano.

== Twin towns ==
- Altavilla Vicentina, Italy
