= List of dialling codes in Italy =

This is a list of dialing codes used in Italy

== Zone 1 - Liguria, Piedmont, and Aosta Valley ==
- 010 – City of Genoa and surroundings
- 011 – City of Turin and surroundings
- 0122 – Metropolitan City of Turin – Susa Valley area
- 0123 – Metropolitan City of Turin – Lanzo Valleys area
- 0124 – Metropolitan City of Turin – Rivarolo Canavese and Orco Valley areas
- 0125 – Metropolitan City of Turin – Ivrea area
- 0131 – Province of Alessandria, including its capital Alessandria
- 0141 – Province of Asti, including its capital Asti
- 015 – Province of Biella, including its capital Biella
- 0161 – Province of Vercelli, including its capital Vercelli
- 0163 – Province of Vercelli – Valsesia
- 0165 – Aosta Valley – regional capital Aosta and Courmayeur
- 0166 – Aosta Valley – Cervinia
- 0171 – Province of Cuneo, including its capital Cuneo
- 0183 – Province of Imperia, including its capital Imperia
- 0184 – Province of Imperia – Sanremo
- 0185 – Metropolitan City of Genoa, except its capital Genoa
- 0187 – Province of La Spezia, including its capital La Spezia and Cinque Terre
- 019 – Province of Savona, including its capital Savona

== Zone 2 - City of Milan and nearby areas ==
- 02 – City of Milan and surroundings, parts of the Province of Varese and Como

== Zone 3 - Eastern Piedmont and Rest of Lombardy ==
- 030 – City of Brescia, Franciacorta, valle Trompia and southern Province
- 031 – Province of Como, including its capital Como
- 0321 – Province of Novara, including its capital Novara
- 0322 – Province of Novara – Borgomanero area
- 0324 – Province of Verbano-Cusio-Ossola
- 0331 – Province of Varese – Busto Arsizio area
- 0332 – Province of Varese, including its capital Varese
- 0341 – Province of Lecco, including its capital Lecco
- 0342 – Province of Sondrio, including its capital Sondrio
- 0343 – Province of Sondrio – area of Chiavenna
- 0344 – Province of Como – area of Menaggio
- 0345 – Province of Bergamo, except its capital Bergamo
- 035 – City of Bergamo and surroundings
- 0362 – Province of Monza – area of Seregno
- 0363 – Provinces of Bergamo and Cremona
- 0364 – Province of Brescia – areas of Valle Camonica and Breno
- 0365 – Province of Brescia – Lake Garda and Valle Sabbia, area of Salò)
- 0371 – City and Province of Lodi and a few towns in the Metropolitan City of Milan
- 0372 – Province of Cremona, including its capital Cremona
- 0373 – Province of Cremona – area of Crema
- 0375 – Province of Cremona and part of the Province of Mantua
- 0376 – Province of Mantua, including its capital Mantua
- 0382 – Province of Pavia, including its capital Pavia
- 039 – Province of Monza and Brianza, including its capital Monza

== Zone 4 – Friuli-Venezia Giulia, Trentino-Alto Adige/Südtirol and Veneto ==
- 040 – City and Province of Trieste
- 041 – City of Venice, including landside Mestre area and Metropolitan city of Venice western and southern area
- 0421 – Metropolitan city of Venice eastern area – area of San Donà di Piave, including Jesolo, one of the italian greatest "seaside towns"
- 0422 – Province of Treviso southern area, including its capital Treviso
- 0423 – Province of Treviso western area – area of Montebelluna
- 0424 – Province of Vicenza northeastern area – area of Bassano del Grappa
- 0425 – Province of Rovigo western area – area of Rovigo
- 0426 – Province of Rovigo eastern area – area of Adria
- 0427 - Province of Pordenone northern area - area of Spilimbergo
- 0428 - Province of Udine northeastern area - area of Tarvisio
- 0429 – Province of Padua southwestern area – area of Este, including southern end of Euganean Hills, Este, Monselice and the fantastic town of Montagnana
- 0431 – Province of Udine southern area – area of Cervignano del Friuli, including the fabulous "seaside town" of Grado (Province of Gorizia)
- 0432 – Province of Udine central area, including its capital Udine
- 0433 - Province of Udine northwestern area - area of Tolmezzo
- 0434 – Province of Pordenone southern area, including its capital Pordenone
- 0435 - Province of Belluno northeastern area - area of Pieve di Cadore, the town where the famous painter Tiziano Vecellio was born
- 0436 - Province of Belluno northwestern area - area of Cortina d'Ampezzo, the fantastic Dolomites area "capital"
- 0437 – Province of Belluno southeastern area, including its capital Belluno
- 0438 – Province of Treviso northern area – area of Conegliano, the "capital" of Prosecco Hills
- 0439 - Province of Belluno southwestern area and Province of Trento eastern area - area of Feltre, a beautiful medieval town
- 0442 - Province of Verona southern area - area of Legnago
- 0444 – Province of Vicenza southern area, including provincial capital
- 0445 – Province of Vicenza western area – area of Schio
- 045 – Province of Verona, including its capital Verona
- 0461 – Province of Trento central area, including its capital Trento
- 0462 - Province of Trento northeastern area - area of Cavalese
- 0463 - Province of Trento northwestern area - area of Cles
- 0464 - Province of Trento southern area - area of Rovereto
- 0465 - Province of Trento southwestern area - area of Tione di Trento
- 0471 – Province of Bolzano southern area, including its capital Bolzano
- 0472 - Province of Bolzano northern area - area of Bressanone
- 0473 - Province of Bolzano western area - area of Merano
- 0474 - Province of Bolzano eastern area - area of Dobbiaco
- 0481 – Province of Gorizia, including its capital Gorizia
- 049 – Province of Padua, including its capital Padua

== Zone 5 - Emilia-Romagna and Tuscany ==
- 050 – City of Pisa and surroundings
- 051 – Metropolitan City of Bologna, including its capital Bologna
- 0521 – Province of Parma, including its capital Parma
- 0522 – Province of Reggio Emilia, including its capital Reggio Emilia
- 0523 – Province of Piacenza, including its capital Piacenza
- 0532 – Province of Ferrara, including its capital Ferrara
- 0535 – Town of Mirandola and surroundings
- 0536 – Industrial district of Sassuolo, Fiorano Modenese, Maranello and Prignano sulla Secchia and for the comunità montana (lit. mountain community) of Frignano
- 0541 – Province of Rimini
- 0543 – Province of Forlì-Cesena - Forlì area
- 0544 – Province of Ravenna
- 0545 – Province of Ravenna
- 0547 – Province of Forlì-Cesena - Cesena area
- 0549 – Republic of San Marino (only TIM San Marino landlines)
- 055 – City of Florence and surroundings
- 0564 – Province of Grosseto, including its capital Grosseto
- 0565 – Southernmost part of the Province of Livorno and Isola d'Elba
- 0566 – District of Follonica and northernmost part of Province of Grosseto
- 0571 – District of Empoli, Province of Florence and part of Province of Pisa
- 0572 – District of Montecatini Terme, Province of Pistoia, and Villa Basilica, Province of Lucca
- 0573 – Province of Pistoia, including its capital Pistoia
- 0574 – Province of Prato, including its capital Prato
- 0575 – Province of Arezzo, including its capital Arezzo
- 0577 – Province of Siena, including its capital Siena
- 0578 – Southernmost part of Province of Siena and the town of Città della Pieve in the Province of Perugia
- 0583 – City of Lucca and most of its Province
- 0584 – Town of Viareggio and Versilia
- 0585 – Province of Massa and Carrara, including its capitals Massa and Carrara
- 0586 – Province of Livorno, including its capital Livorno
- 0587 – Area of Pontedera and surroundings, Province of Pisa
- 0588 – Area of Volterra, Province of Pisa
- 059 – Province of Modena, including its capital Modena

== Zone 6 - City of Rome, Vatican City and nearby areas ==
- 06 – City of Rome and surroundings, including Vatican City

== Zone 7 - Marche, Lazio, Umbria and Sardinia ==
- 070 – Province of Cagliari, including its capital Cagliari
- 071 – Province of Ancona, including its capital Ancona
- 0721 – Province of Pesaro and Urbino, including its capitals Pesaro and Urbino
- 0731 – Province of Ancona – area of Jesi
- 0732 – Province of Ancona – area of Fabriano
- 0733 – Province of Macerata, including its capital Macerata
- 0734 – Province of Fermo, including its capital Fermo
- 0735 – Province of Ascoli Piceno – area of San Benedetto del Tronto
- 0736 – Province of Ascoli Piceno
- 0737 – Province of Macerata – area of Camerino
- 075 – Province of Perugia
- 0761 – Province of Viterbo
- 0765 - Province of Rieti – area of Poggio Mirteto
- 0771 – Province of Latina – areas of Formia and Fondi
- 0773 – Province of Latina
- 0774 – Province of Rome – area of Tivoli
- 0775 – Province of Frosinone
- 0776 – Province of Frosinone – area of Cassino
- 0782 – Province of Nuoro – area of Ogliastra
- 0783 – Province of Oristano
- 0784 – Province of Nuoro
- 0789 – Province of Sassari - areas of Olbia and Costa Smeralda
- 079 – Province of Sassari, including provincial capital and Alghero

== Zone 8 - Abruzzo, Molise, Campania and Apulia ==
- 080 – City of Bari and surroundings
- 081 – City of Naples and surroundings
- 0823 – Province of Caserta
- 0824 – Province of Benevento
- 0825 – Province of Avellino
- 0831 – Province of Brindisi
- 0832 – Province of Lecce
- 0835 - Province of Matera
- 085 – Province of Pescara
- 0861 – Province of Teramo
- 0862 – Province of L'Aquila
- 0865 – Province of Isernia
- 0874 – Province of Campobasso
- 0881 – Province of Foggia, including provincial capital
- 0882 – Province of Foggia - areas of Apricena, San Giovanni Rotondo and Tremiti Islands
- 0883 – Province of Barletta-Andria-Trani
- 0884 – Province of Foggia - areas of Rodi Garganico, Vieste and Manfredonia
- 089 – Province of Salerno

== Zone 9 - Calabria, Sicily, Basilicata, rest of Apulia ==
- 090 - Metropolitan City of Messina
- 091 - City of Palermo and surroundings
- 0921 - Metropolitan City of Palermo
- 0931 - Province of Siracusa
- 0932 - Province of Ragusa
- 0933 - Province of Caltanissetta
- 0923 - Province of Trapani
- 0922 - Province of Agrigento
- 0924 - City of Alcamo and surroundings.
- 0925 - Province of Agrigento
- 0934 - Provinces of Caltanissetta and Enna
- 0941 - Novara di Sicilia
- 0942 - Province of Messina - area of Taormina
- 095 - City of Catania and surroundings
- 0961 - Province of Catanzaro
- 0962 - Province of Crotone
- 0963 - Province of Vibo Valentia
- 0965 - Province of Reggio Calabria
- 0974 - Province of Salerno
- 0971 - Province of Potenza
- 099 - Province of Taranto
- 0984 - City of Cosenza - area of Cosenza

== See also ==
- Telephone numbers in Italy
- Area codes
