= Apulia =

Region of Italy

Apulia Puglia (Note: Local names: Barese: Púgghie [ˈpuɟːə] Foggiano: Puie Tarantino: Puje [ˈpuːjə] Salentino: Puia [ˈpuːja] Faetar: Poulye [ˈpujə, ˈpuʎə] Griko: Απουλία [apuˈli.a] Arbëreshë Albanian: Pulia)
- Region
- Flag Coat of arms

- Coordinates: 41°N 16°E
- Country: Italy
- Capital: Bari

Government
  - Type: Presidential system
  - President: Antonio Decaro (PD)

Area
  - Total: 19,540.90 km^{2} (7,544.78 sq mi)

Population (2026)
  - Total: 3,865,277
  - Density: 197.8045/km^{2} (512.3112/sq mi)
- Demonym(s): English: Apulian; Italian: Pugliese

GDP
  - Total: €94.508 billion (2024)
  - Per capita: €24,377 (2024)
- Time zone: UTC+01:00 (CET)
  - Summer (DST): UTC+02:00 (CEST)
- ISO 3166 code: IT-75
- HDI (2021): 0.856 very high · 18th of 21
- NUTS Region: ITF
- Website: regione.puglia.it

Apulia (/əˈpuːliə/ ə-POO-lee-ə), also known by its Italian name Puglia (Italian: [ˈpuʎʎa]), is one of the 20 regions of Italy, located in the southern peninsular section of the country, bordering the Adriatic Sea to the east, the Strait of Otranto and Ionian Sea to the southeast and the Gulf of Taranto to the south. The region comprises 19,540.90 square kilometers (7,544.78 sq mi), and has 3,865,277 inhabitants as of 2026. It is bordered by the regions of Molise to the north, Campania to the west, and Basilicata to the southwest. The regional capital is Bari.

In ancient times, more precisely at the beginning of the first millennium BC, the region of Apulia was inhabited by the Iapygians, while during the 8th century BC its coastal areas were populated by ancient Greeks. Later, the region was conquered by the ancient Romans. It was then conquered by the Byzantines, followed by the Normans, the Aragonese and the Spanish. Subsequently, it became part of the Kingdom of the Two Sicilies, to then be annexed to the unified Kingdom of Italy after the Expedition of the Thousand.

== History ==
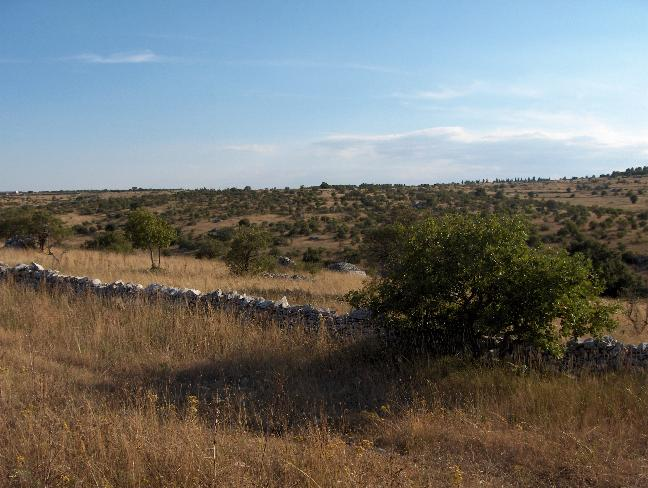
Landscape of the Murge plateau

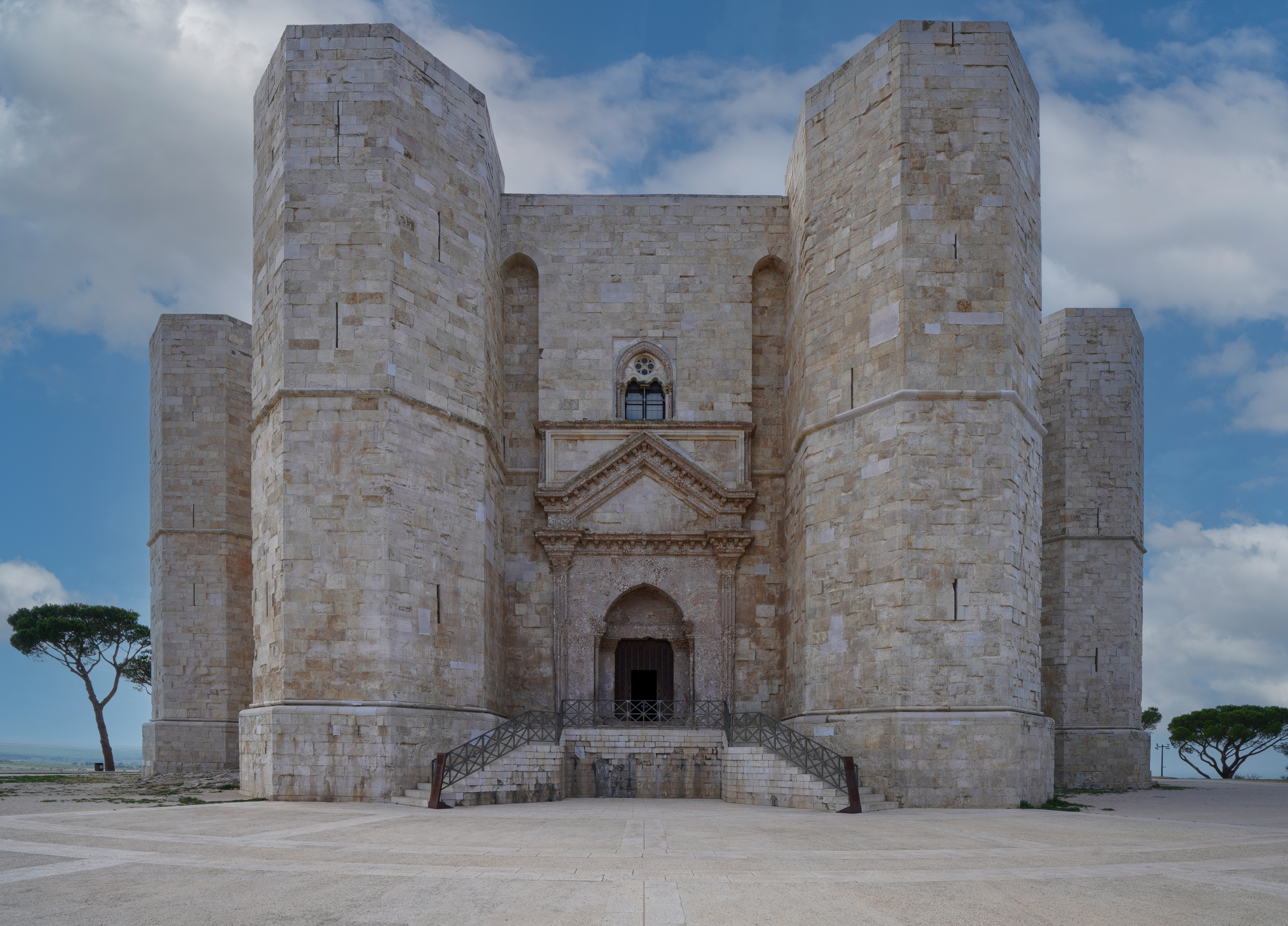
Castel del Monte, built by the King of Sicily and Holy Roman Emperor Frederick II between 1240 and 1250 in Andria

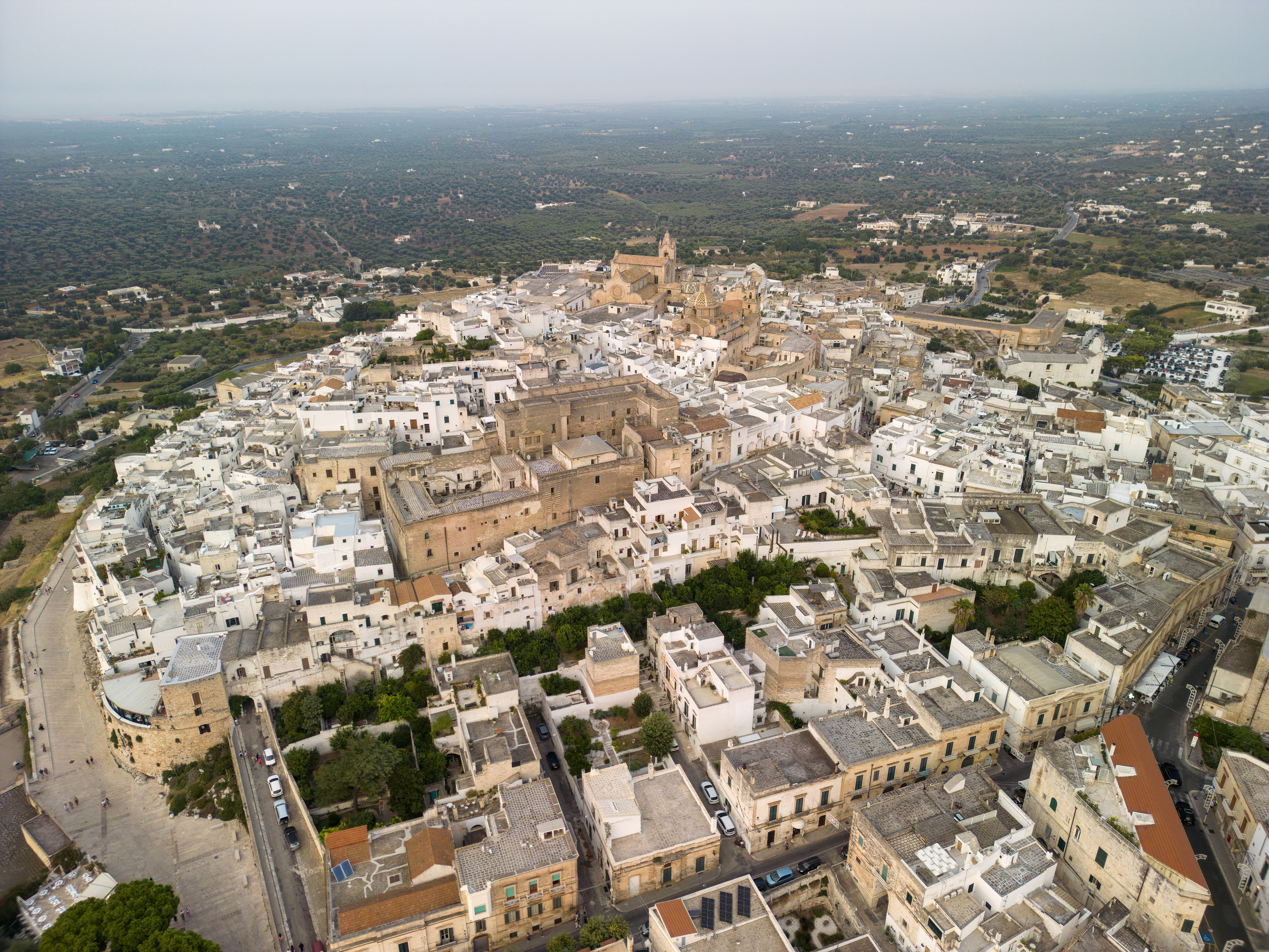
The medieval town of Ostuni

=== Antiquity ===
Human settlement in Apulia dates back to at least 250,000 years ago, as evidenced by the fossil remains of the Altamura Man, an archaic form of Neanderthal. There are numerous finds from the prehistoric era, including several menhir and dolmen.

Around the 1st millennium BC, the Iapygians settled in the territory with the tribes of the Daunians, the Peucetians and the Messapians, as well as the populations of the Calabri and the Sallentini (both settled in Salento); later, in the Hellenic era, the Magna Graecia colonies were quite numerous, especially in the southern part of the region, including the city of Taras, now Taranto.

During the second Samnite war (326–304 BC), the Roman army, in an attempt to provide relief to Lucera, besieged by the Samnites, suffered a serious defeat in the Battle of the Caudine Forks, in 321 BC. Rome soon understood the strategic importance of Apulia (corresponding only to the central-northern part of present-day Apulia, while the Salento Peninsula was known as Calabria in that period), but the occupation of the region, in the third century BC, was not easy, especially for the resistance of Tarentum and Brundisium. In 216 BC in Cannae the Roman army suffered its worst defeat against Hannibal's Carthage.

Around 7 BC, emperor Augustus divided Roman Italy into regions, one of them being Regio II Apulia et Calabria. Later on, emperor Diocletian (284–305) reorganized Italian regions into provinces, and the newly created Province of Apulia and Calabria was placed under the jurisdiction of the Diocese of Suburbicarian Italy. With the construction of the Appian Way and, in the imperial era, of the Via Traiana along which cities such as Troia, Ordona, Gravina, Canosa, Ruvo and Bitonto prospered. The region occupied leading positions in the production of grain and oil, becoming the largest exporter of olive oil in the East.

=== Middle Ages and Renaissance period ===
Byzantine provinces (themes) in southern Italy, around 1000 (Calabria, Lucania, Langobardia)

At the Fall of the Western Roman Empire (476), Apulia also went through a prolonged period of unrest and political changes. Under the Ostrogothic rule, the old Roman Province of Apulia and Calabria continued to exist within administrative structures of the Ostrogothic realm. In 535, Byzantine Emperor Justinian I (527-565) launched the re-conquest of Italy, thus initiating the Gothic War, that ended with Byzantine victory (554). Under imperial rule, the Praetorian prefecture of Italy also included the province of Apulia and Calabria (modern Apulia with Salento). Since 569, the invading Lombards tried and partially succeeded to conquer much of the region. Responding to those threats, remaining Byzantine territories in Italy were regrouped into several regions, or eparchies in 580, one of them being Calabria, that was encompassing not only ancient Roman Calabria (Salento), but also remaining parts of Apulia, Lucania and Bruttium, thus laying foundation for the expansion of the term. Already by 584, the entire Italian Prefecture was reorganized into the Exarchate of Ravenna, that was encompassing the enlarged Calabria, but in time much of southern Italy, including parts of Apulia, fell under the rule of Lombard Duchy of Benevento.

During the 9th century, coastal regions of Apulia were briefly occupied by Saracens who established the Emirate of Bari. Saracens were driven out of Apulia during 870s, and the Byzantine rule was imposed again throughout Apulia, with Bari becoming the capital of a distinctive Byzantine province (theme) known as Langobardia (in reference to regions recaptured from Beneventan Lombards), that was by the middle of the 10th century placed under jurisdiction of the newly created Catepanate of Italy.

With the advent of the Normans in the 11th century, Taranto became the capital of the Principality of Taranto, which extended across the entire Terra di Otranto.

In 1043, the Norman adventurer William of Hauteville founded the county of Apulia, which in 1057 merged into the vast County of Apulia and Calabria, under the rule of his younger brother, Robert Guiscard. This territory, which became the Duchy of Apulia and Calabria, progressively extended up to the Principality of Salerno. From 1130 it became part of the Kingdom of Sicily under the rule of Roger II of Sicily, yet another Hauteville (their father Tancred sired thirteen sons) and Robert Guiscard's younger brother. In the 13th century the name Apulia was used by some authors to indicate the southern part of the Italian peninsula. During the Sicilian domination Apulia achieved great material and civil progress, which reached its peak with Frederick II, who was responsible for the construction of a series of secular and religious buildings, some of high artistic value, including Castel del Monte, near Andria. During this period Foggia became one of his residences. From 1282, following the separation of the island of Sicily from the rest of the south of the peninsula, Apulia was under the rule of the Kingdom of Naples, from that moment the power of the landowners began to take root in the territory.

=== Early modern period ===
From the middle of the 18th century the region of Apulia experienced a period of strong economic prosperity and excellent development of trade and agriculture. Between 1806 and 1815, during the Napoleonic era, provided the modernization of Apulia with the abolition of feudalism and judicial reforms until the return of the Bourbons and the birth of the Kingdom of the Two Sicilies. Liberal movements were formed throughout the region in 1820 with the spread of Freemasonry and Carbonari.

With the Kingdom of Italy established in 1861, Apulia was administratively divided into the provinces of Foggia, Bari and Lecce; to these were added in the twentieth century the provinces of Brindisi and Taranto. In the period following the unification of Italy, various brigand gangs arose, especially in Capitanata and Terra di Bari; among the major exponents are Michele Caruso, Antonio Angelo Del Sambro and Giuseppe Schiavone, the latter a faithful lieutenant of the Lucanian brigand leader Carmine Crocco.

=== Modern period ===
With the progressive decline of the latifundium, the ancient Apulian farms, properties of medium agricultural size, also decayed. During fascism, Apulia was affected by numerous land reclamations in vast areas and, following the post-war agrarian reform, the region enjoyed strong agricultural development. In the 1970s and 1980s the economy of the region moved from the primary sector to the tertiary one, with notable development coming from the tourism sector.

== Geography ==
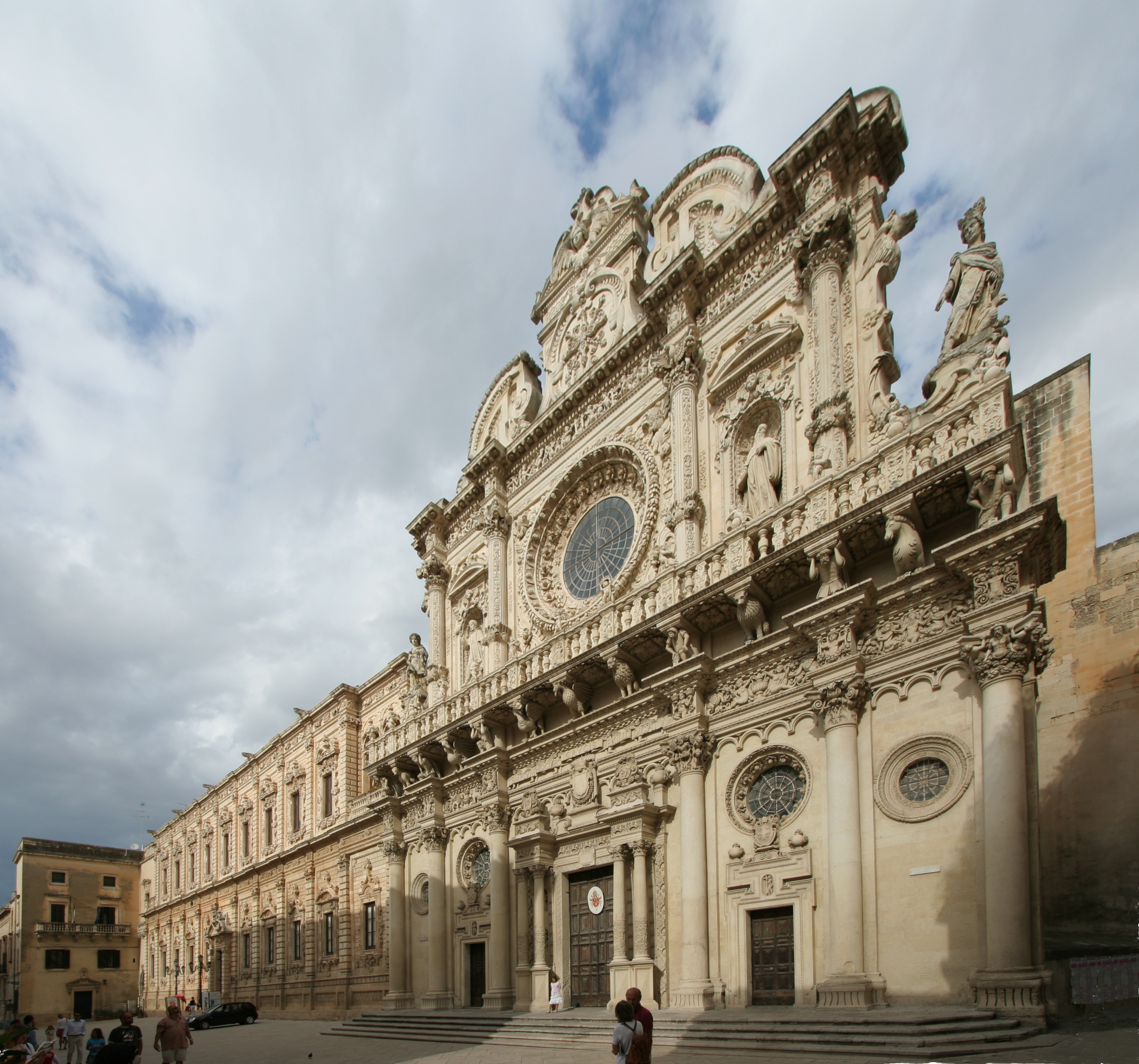
Lecce

Apulia's coastline is longer than that of any other mainland Italian region. In the north, the Gargano promontory extends out into the Adriatic sea like a "sperone" ("spur"), while in the south, the Salento peninsula forms the "tacco" ("heel") of Italy's boot. The highest peak in the region is Monte Cornacchia 1,152 m (3,780 ft) above sea level) within the Daunian Mountains, in the north along the Apennines.

It is home to two national parks, the Alta Murgia National Park and Gargano National Park.

Outside national parks in the North and West, most of Apulia, particularly the Salento peninsula, is geographically flat with only moderate hills.

The climate is typically Mediterranean with hot, dry and sunny summers and mild and rainy winters. Snowfall, especially on the coast is rare but has occurred as recently as January 2019 (following on from snow in March 2018 and January 2017). Apulia is among the hottest and driest regions of Italy in summer, with temperatures sometimes reaching and exceeding 40 °C (104 °F) in Lecce and Foggia.

The coastal areas, particularly on the Adriatic Sea and in the southern Salento peninsula, are frequently exposed to winds of varying strengths and directions, strongly affecting local temperatures and conditions, sometimes within the same day. The Northerly Bora wind from the Adriatic Sea can lower temperatures, humidity and moderate summer heat while the Southerly Sirocco wind from North Africa can raise temperatures, and humidity and occasionally drop red dust from the Sahara Desert. On some days in spring and autumn/fall, it can be warm enough to swim in Gallipoli and Porto Cesareo on the Ionian coast while at the same time, cool winds warrant jackets and jumpers/sweaters in Monopoli and Otranto on the Adriatic coast.

The area between Otranto and Santa Maria di Leuca is part of the Regional Natural Coastal Park of "Costa Otranto — Santa Maria di Leuca e Bosco di Tricase" wanted by the Apulia Region in 2008. This territory has numerous natural and historical attractions such as Ciolo, which is a rocky cove.

In 2010 the Ministry of Health declared 98.6% of the Apulian coasts suitable for bathing.

== Demographics ==
Historical population
Year	Pop.	±%
1861	1,334,619	—
1871	1,440,079	+7.9%
1881	1,608,766	+11.7%
1901	1,986,806	+23.5%
1911	2,195,335	+10.5%
1921	2,365,169	+7.7%
1931	2,508,305	+6.1%
1936	2,642,076	+5.3%
1951	3,220,485	+21.9%
1961	3,421,217	+6.2%
1971	3,582,787	+4.7%
1981	3,871,617	+8.1%
1991	4,031,885	+4.1%
2001	4,020,707	−0.3%
2011	4,052,566	+0.8%
2021	3,922,941	−3.2%
Source: ISTAT

As of 2026, the population is 3,865,277, of which 48.9% are male, and 51.1% are female. Minors make up 14.5% of the population, and seniors make up 25.3%.

=== Migration ===
Emigration from the region's depressed areas to northern Italy and the rest of Europe was very intense in the years between 1956 and 1971. Subsequently, the trend declined, as economic conditions improved, to the point where there was net immigration in the years between 1982 and 1985. Since 1986, the stagnation in employment has led to a new inversion of the trend caused by a decrease in immigration.

As of 2025, immigrants make up 5.9% of the population. The 5 largest foreign countries of birth are Romania, Albania, Germany, Switzerland, and Morocco.

== Government and politics ==
Since 7 January 2026, former mayor of Bari, Antonio Decaro of the Democratic Party, has served as President of the Apulian region.

=== Administrative divisions ===
Provinces and metropolitan cities of Apulia

Apulia is divided into 1 metropolitan city and 5 provinces:

Province or Metropolitan city	Population (2026)	Area (km²)	Density (inh./km²)	Municipalities
Metropolitan City of Bari	1,218,073	3,862.88	315.3	41
Province of Barletta-Andria-Trani	375,933	1,542.95	243.6	10
Province of Brindisi	373,631	1,861.12	200.8	20
Province of Foggia	587,785	7,007.54	83.9	61
Province of Lecce	761,927	2,799.07	272.2	96
Province of Taranto	547,928	2,467.35	222.1	29

== Culture ==
=== Cuisine ===
Important locally produced ingredients include olive oil, artichokes, tomatoes, eggplant, asparagus, and various kinds of seafood. Local specialties include the carosello, a variety of muskmelon which is often consumed when unripe. Apulian Protected designation of origin (PDO) and Protected Geographical indication (PGI) products included cheeses, olive oils, fruits and vegetables, and a type of bread.

Typically Apulian pasta shapes are orecchiette, cavatelli, troccoli, strascinati and pizzarieddi, Popular street foods include panzerotti, sgagliozze (fried polenta), popizze (small fried balls of pizza dough that are sometimes also called pettole), rustici (puff pastries stuffed with tomatoes, béchamel sauce, mozzarella, and black pepper), and focaccia barese (foccaccia with fresh tomatoes and olives). Some popular pastries / desserts include the famous pasticiotto (a flaky shortbread dough filled with custard), chiacchiere, tette delle monache, sannacchiudere and cupeta. A popular snack from Apulia are taralli.

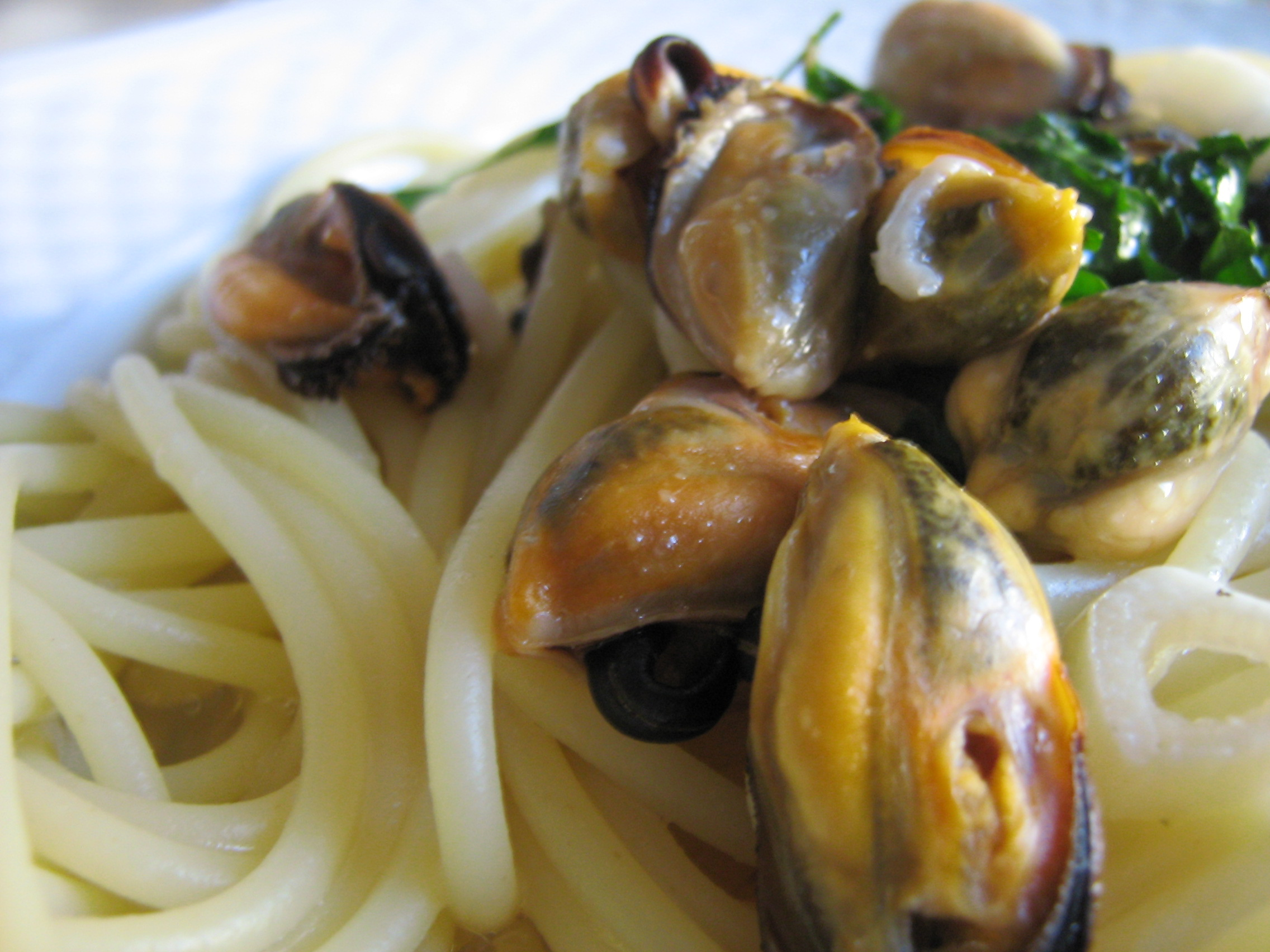
Spaghetti con le cozze (with mussels)

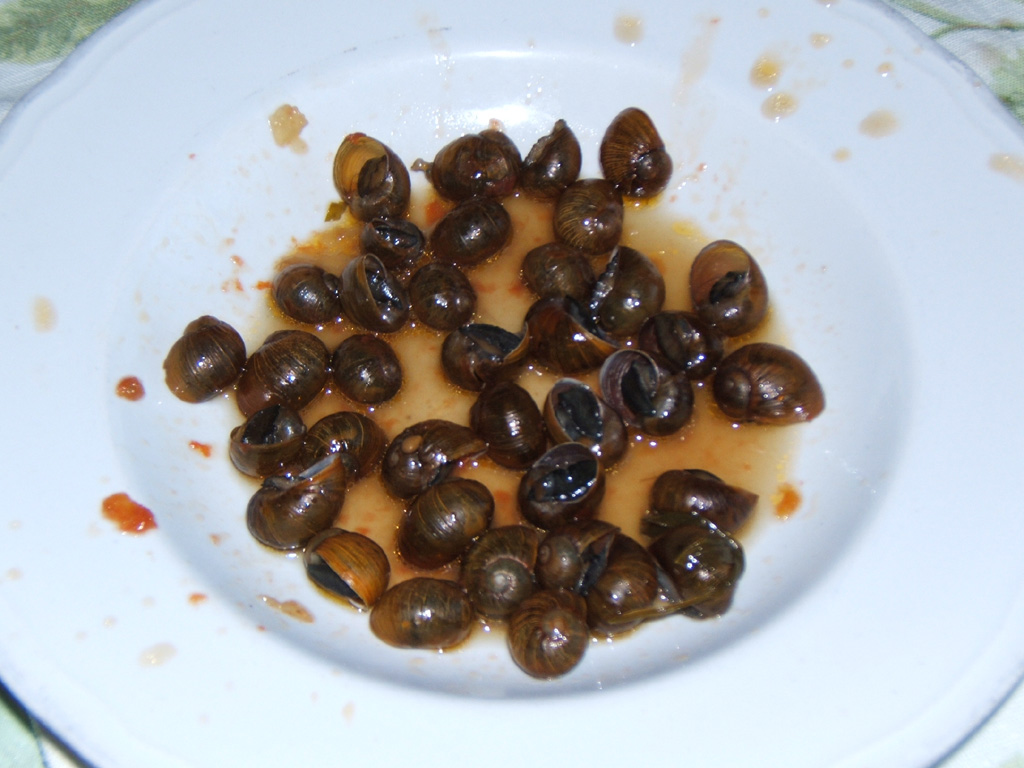
Monacelle (land snail species Cantareus apertus)

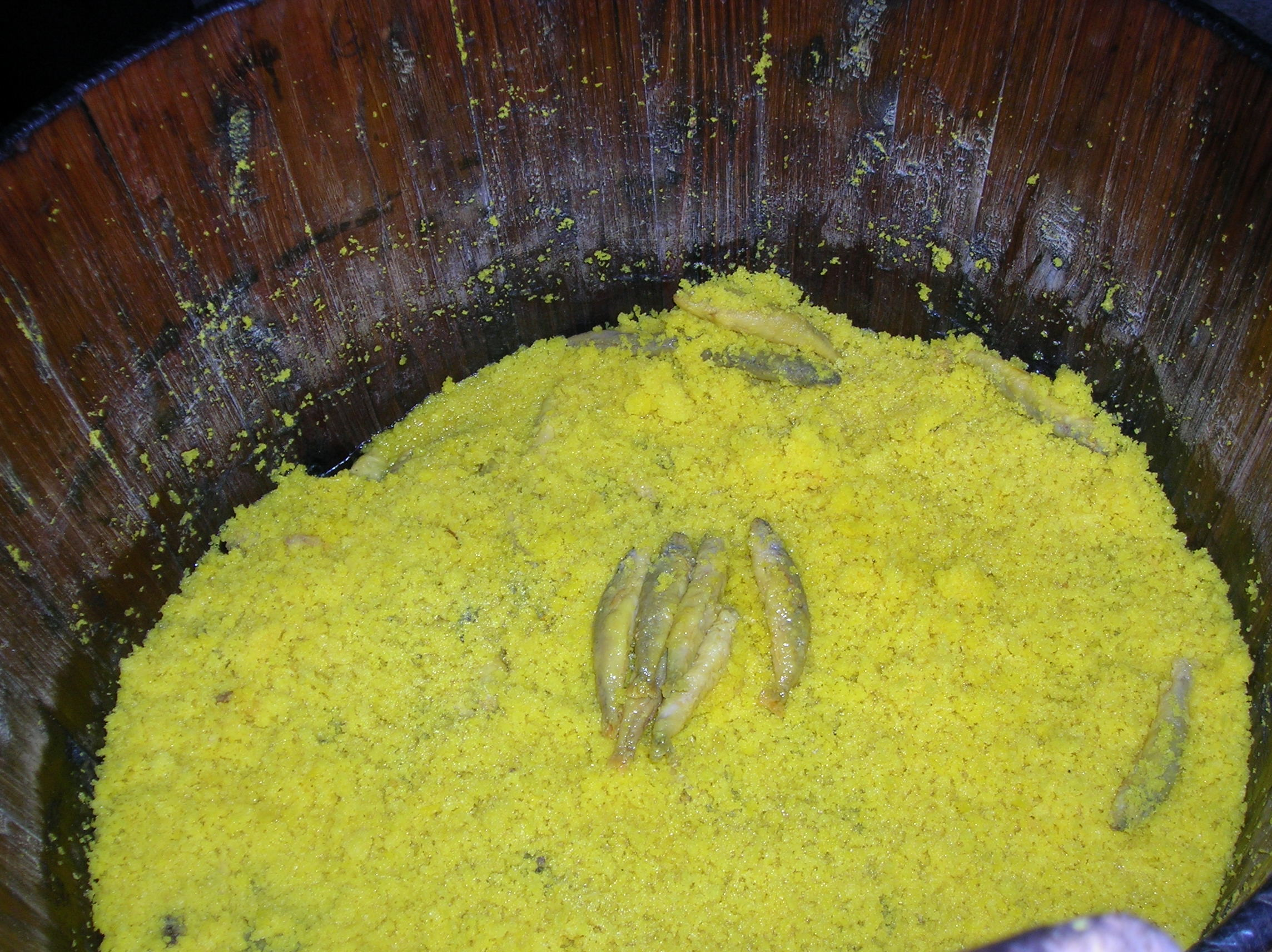
Scapece gallipolina: fried fish preserved in red wine vinegar with bread crumbs and saffron

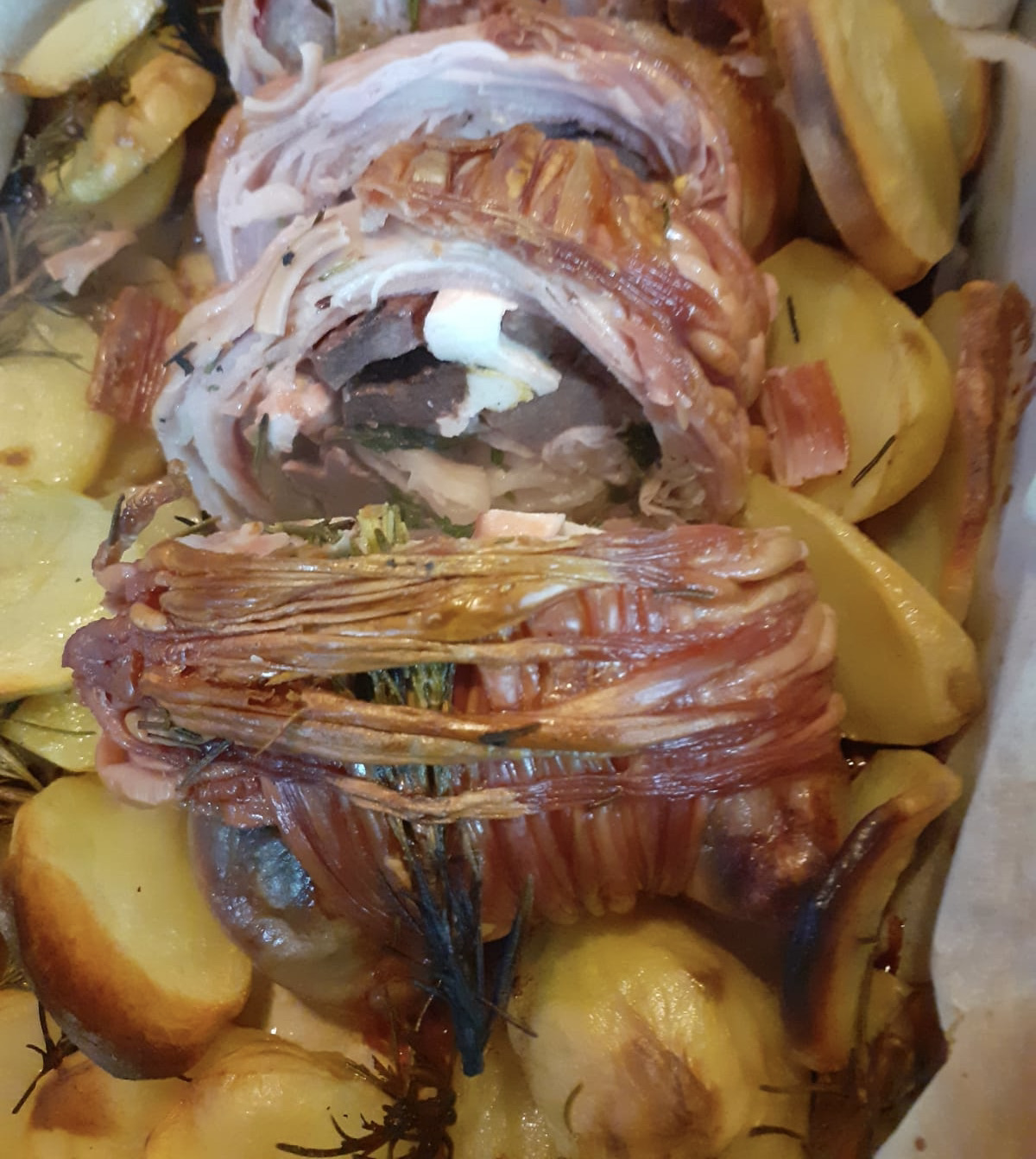
Cazzomarro: baked involtini of lamb entrails

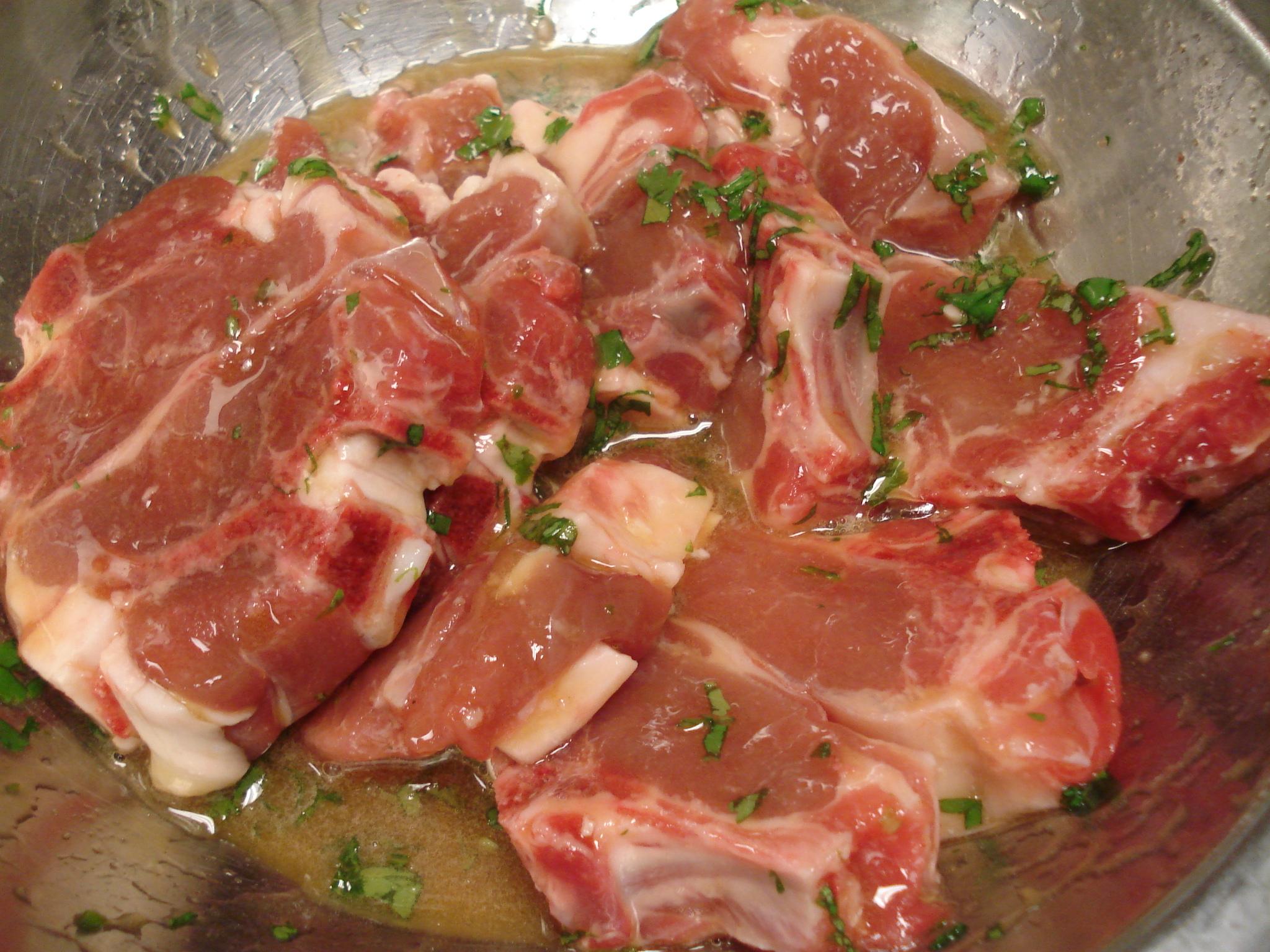
Goat chops

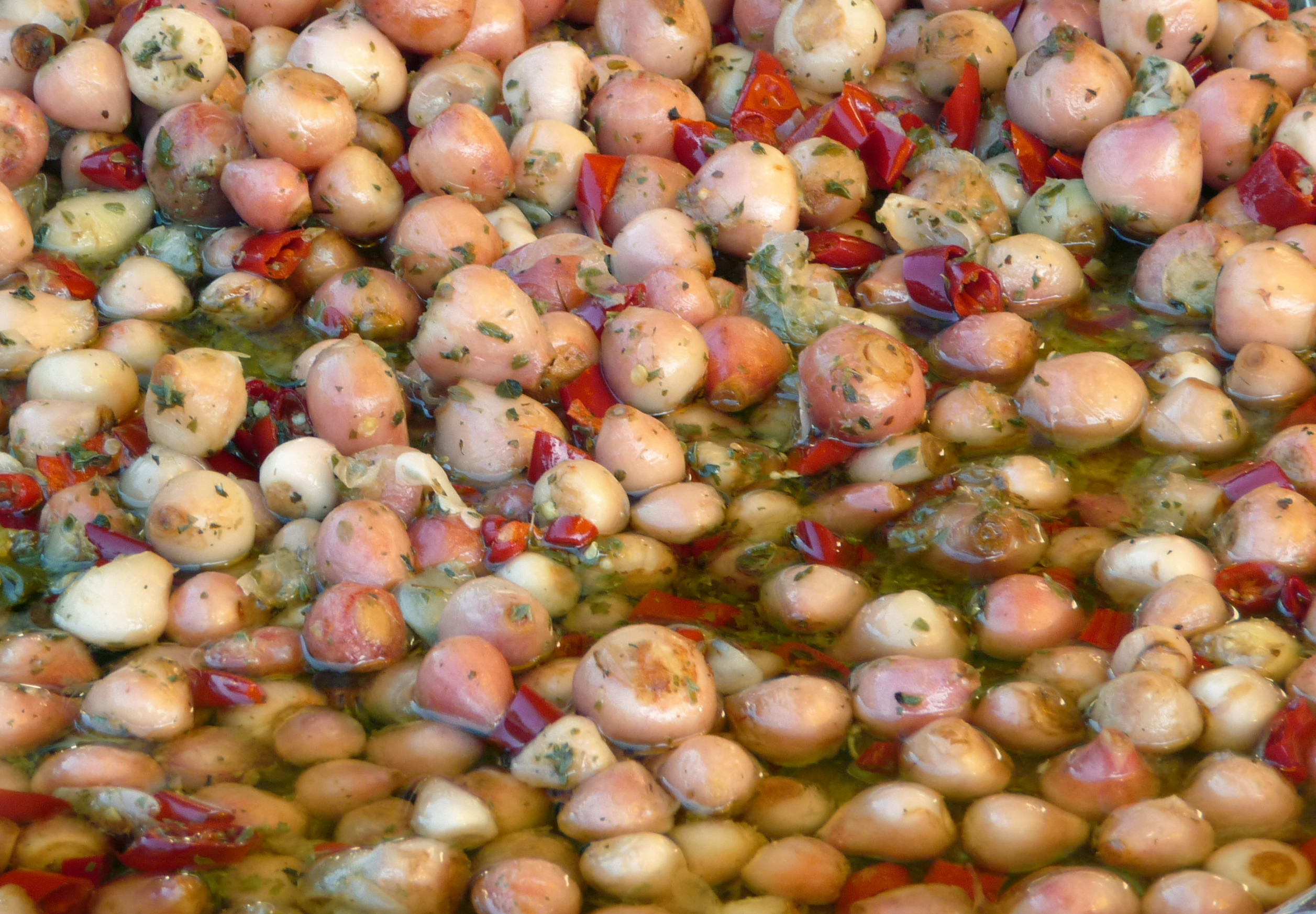
Lampascioni sott'olio, prepared bulbs of the grape hyacinth Leopoldia comosa preserved in olive oil

=== Language ===
As with the other regions of Italy, the national language (since 1861) is Italian. However, because of its long and varied history, other historical languages have been used in this region for centuries. The local languages of northern and central Apulia (roughly the provinces of Bari, Barletta-Andria-Trani, and Foggia as well as the northwestern parts of the Province of Taranto) are the Apulian Southern Italo-Romance dialects, including Bari dialect and Tarantino dialect. In the southern region of Salento, an extreme Southern Italo-Romance language, the Salentino dialect is widely spoken. There is also an Italiot Greek language found in Salento called Griko, which is still spoken by a few thousand Griko people in some areas. In addition, a rare daughter language of the Franco-Provençal language called Faetar is spoken in the mountain villages of Faeto and Celle di San Vito, in the Province of Foggia. It is sometimes classified as a pair of dialects of Franco-Provençal, Faetar and Cellese. The Arbëreshë dialect of the Albanian language has been spoken by a small community since refugees settled there in the 16th century.

=== Famous musicians ===
- Alessandra Amoroso
- Albano
- Renzo Arbore
- Nicola Di Bari
- Serena Brancale
- Caparezza
- Farinelli
- Mietta
- Domenico Modugno
- Mariella Nava
- Officina Zoè
- Anna Oxa
- Adriano Pappalardo
- Nicolo' Piccinni
- Radiodervish
- Toni Santagata
- Tonino Zurlo

=== Famous politicians ===
- Gianni Alemanno
- Francesco Boccia
- Franco Borgia
- Ettore Bucciero
- Giuseppe Caldarola
- Ricciotto Canudo
- Franco Cassano
- Gianrico Carofiglio
- Giuseppe Conte
- Antonio De Caro
- Giuseppe Di Vittorio
- Giuseppe Di Vagno
- Michele Emiliano
- Tommaso Fiore
- Raffaele Fitto
- Rino Formica
- Franco Giordano
- Pietro Laforgia
- Vito Leccese
- Vito Vittorio Lenoci
- Alfredo Mantovano
- Biagio Marzo
- Gianvito Mastroleo
- Daniela Mazzucca
- Antonio Matarrese
- Guglielmo Minervini
- Celeste Nardini
- Aldo Moro
- Ubaldo Pagano
- Giovanni Papapietro
- Giovanni Pellegrino
- Adriana Poli Bortone
- Anna Maria Princigalli
- Alfredo Reicclein
- Gaetano Salvemini
- Bona Sforza
- Claudio Signorile
- Rosa Stanisci
- Giuseppe Tatarella
- Gennaro Trisorio Liuzzi
- Niki Vendola

=== Saints and religious figures ===
- Pope Benedict XIII
- Pope Boniface IX
- Pope Innocent XII
- Pio da Pietrelcina (Padre Pio)
- Saint Nicolas Bari
- Antonio Bello
- Pietro Pappagallo

=== Cinema personalities ===
- Checco Zalone
- Dino Abbrescia
- Lino Banfi
- Mariangela Barbanente
- Nico Cirasole
- Riccardo Cucciolla
- Agostino Ferrente
- Cecilia Mangini
- Pippo Mezzapesa
- Alessandro Piva
- Michele Placido
- Michele Morrone
- Sergio Rubini
- Paolo Sassanelli
- Riccardo Scamarcio
- Rodolfo Valentino
- Edoardo Winspeare

=== Intellectuals and cultural figures ===
- Carmelo Bene
- Antonio Bello
- Giovanni Bovio
- Carlo Cafiero
- Gianrico Carofiglio
- Francesco De Nittis
- Tommaso Fiore
- Giuseppe Caldarola
- Luciano Canfora
- Franco Cassano
- Francesca Giannone
- David Kalonymos
- Nicola Lagioia
- Giovanni Laterza
- Giuseppe Laterza
- Raffaele Nigro
- Armando Perotti
- Ada Princigalli
- Gaetano Salvemini
- Francesco Tornabene Roccaforte
- Giuseppe Vacca

=== Famous athletes ===
- Francesco Bruno
- Luciano Bruno
- Valeria Caracuta
- Antonio Cassano
- Franco Causio
- Rosalba Console
- Antonio Conte
- Martina Criscio
- Ferdinando De Giorgi
- Elena Diliddo
- Vito Dell'Aquila
- Marco de Tullio
- Emanuele Fiume
- Clara Guerra
- Pia Carmen Lionetti
- Francesco Martino
- Marco Materazzi
- Pietro Mennea
- Domenico Montrone
- Antonella Palmisano
- Flavia Pennetta
- Michele Piccirillo
- Stefania Sansonna
- Luigi Samele
- Massimo Stano
- Nicola Ventola
- Roberta Vinci
- Antonio Giovinazzi

=== Sports ===
Apulia is home to several national football, water polo, volleyball, basketball and tennis clubs.

Across the top three levels of Italian football, the clubs in Apulia include:

- U.S. Lecce playing in Serie A
- S.S.C. Bari playing in Serie B
- Calcio Foggia 1920 playing in Serie C
- S.S. Audace Cerignola playing in Serie C
- S.S. Monopoli 1966 playing in Serie C

== Economy ==
The region's contribution to Italy's gross value added was around 4.6% in 2000, while its population was 7% of the total. The per capita GDP is low compared to the national average and represents about 68.1% of the EU average.

The share of gross value added by the agricultural and services sectors was above the national average in 2000. The region has industries specialising in particular areas, including food processing and vehicles in Foggia; footwear and textiles in the Barletta province, and wood and furniture in the Murge area to the west.

Between 2007 and 2013 the economy of Apulia expanded more than that of the rest of southern Italy. Such growth, over several decades, is a severe challenge to the hydrogeological system.

Apulia's thriving economy is articulated into numerous sectors boasting several leading companies, but most of them produce materials or components, not finished goods:

- Aerospace (Leonardo, Avio Aero, Sitael, Blackshape)
- Automotive (Bosch, Marelli Europe, Magna Gertrag, Bridgestone)
- Mechanics (New Holland Construction, Iveco Motori, Isotta Fraschini Motori, MERMEC)
- Furniture (Natuzzi)
- Food and Beverage (De Carlo, Divella, Quarta Caffé)
- Agriculture (Casillo Group, G.C. Partecipazioni)
- Publishing (Editori Laterza, Edizioni Dedalo)
- Tourism (Nicolaus tour)
- Logistics (GTS Rail)
- I.C.T. (Exprivia)

In Taranto, there is the largest metallurgical work ILVA Acciaierie di Taranto (8,200 empl.) in Europe with a full iron and steel production cycle. It will be sold to Arcelor Mittal.

In Brindisi, there is a chemical industrial park with an Eni power station, Eni oil refinery, Eni Rewind chemical factory, and Versalis chemical factory (basic chemistry, intermediates, polyethene, styrenics and elastomers). LyondellBasell polypropylene plant, Sanofi plant (antibiotics). Another Eni oil refinery is located in Taranto.

=== Unemployment ===
The unemployment rate stood at 14.1% in 2020.

Year	2006	2007	2008	2009	2010	2011	2012	2013	2014	2015	2016	2017	2018	2019	2020
unemployment rate (in %)	12.6%	11.1%	11.6%	12.6%	13.5%	13.2%	15.7%	19.7%	21.5%	19.7%	19.4%	18.8%	16.1%	14.8%	14.1%

=== Fishing and aquaculture ===
The port of Taranto hosts numerous fishing boats. The fleet is mainly made up of about 80 fishing boats, which do not exceed 10 gross tonnage and which practice trawling, while the remaining small-scale fishing boats operate with gillnets. The sea, rich and generous, is populated by dentex, sea bream, glit-head bream, grouper, redfish, mullet, mussels, sea urchin, anchovies, shrimp and squid. Other significant fishing ports are Manfredonia, Trani, Molfetta, Mola di Bari, Monopoli, Castro, and Gallipoli.

Today Taranto is the world's largest producer of farmed mussels: with 1,300 employees, around 30,000 tons of mussels are processed per year. Mussel farming has characterized the city's economy for centuries, making the mussel the gastronomic symbol of Taranto. It is said that the first mussel gardens in La Spezia, Pula, Olbia and Chioggia were established by mussel farmers who emigrated from this city. The workplace of the Taranto mussel farmers is the boat; every detail of the working method has improved over time.

10 m long structures made of wood or metal, called "pali" (piles), are attached to the seabed, to which ropes and nets are then attached, on which the mussels are grown. Mussels grow in a mixture of salt seawater and karst freshwater, impacting the flavour of the mollusks. While there are around 18 submarine freshwater springs, called "Citri", in the Mar Piccolo, there is only one large one in the Mar Grande, which is called "Anello di San Cataldo" in honour of the patron saint of the city.

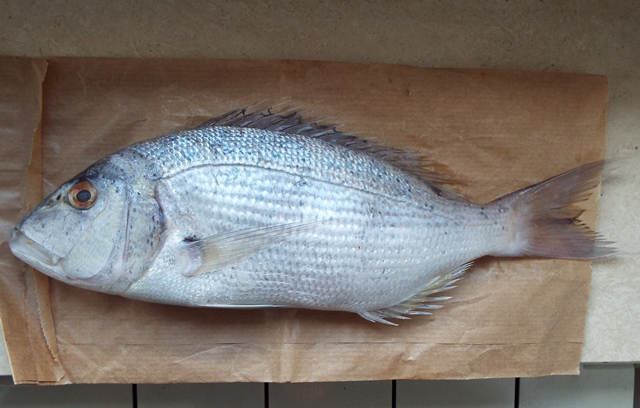
Dentex

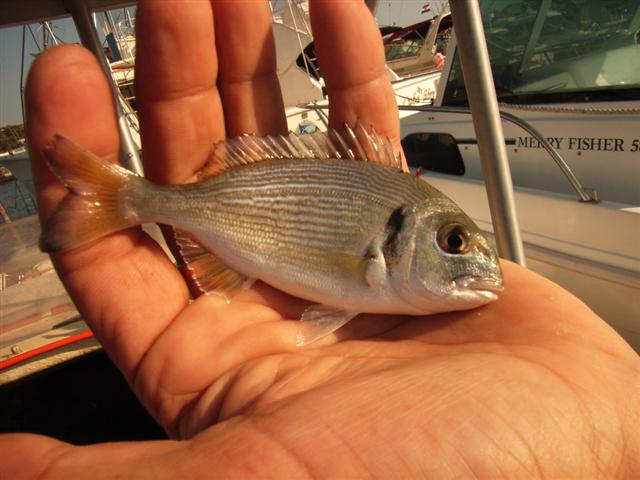
Sea bream

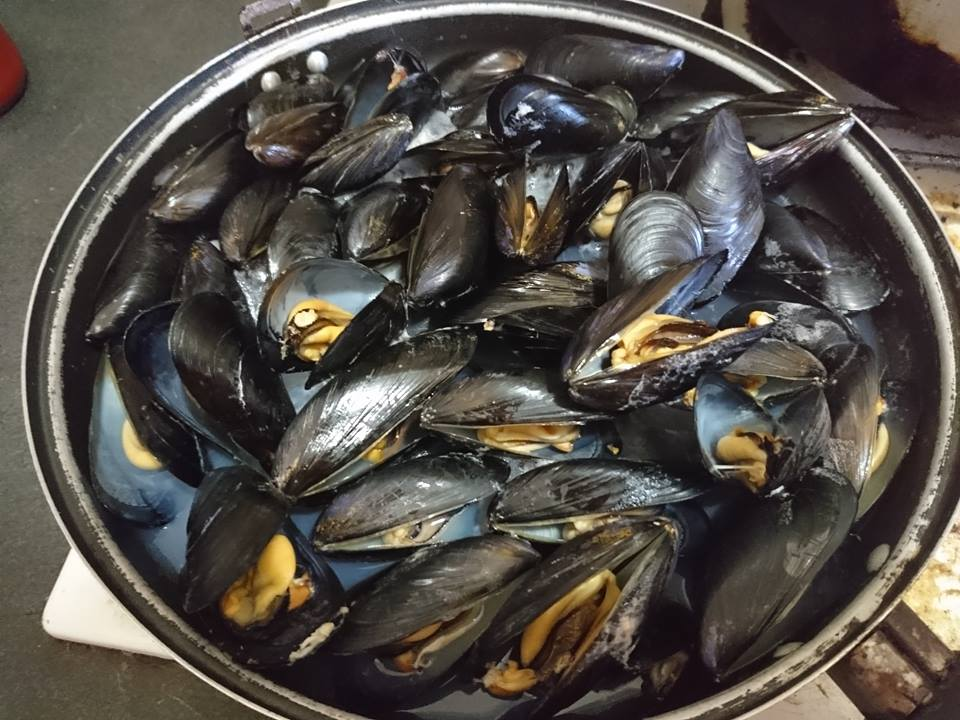
Mussels

=== Agriculture ===
Agriculture plays a prominent economic role in Apulia. It is mainly intensive and modern agriculture that allows the region to be among the first in Italy for the production of many products:

- durum wheat which is used to produce pasta
- tomatoes
- grape
- almonds
- olive oil

Vegetable growing (lettuce, artichoke, fennel, cabbage, celery, barattiere, borage, sweet potato, caper, portulaca, broccoli rabe) and horticulture (peach, orange, clementine, lemon, kumquat, fig, pomegranate, persimmon, prickly pear) are also developed.

=== Viticulture ===
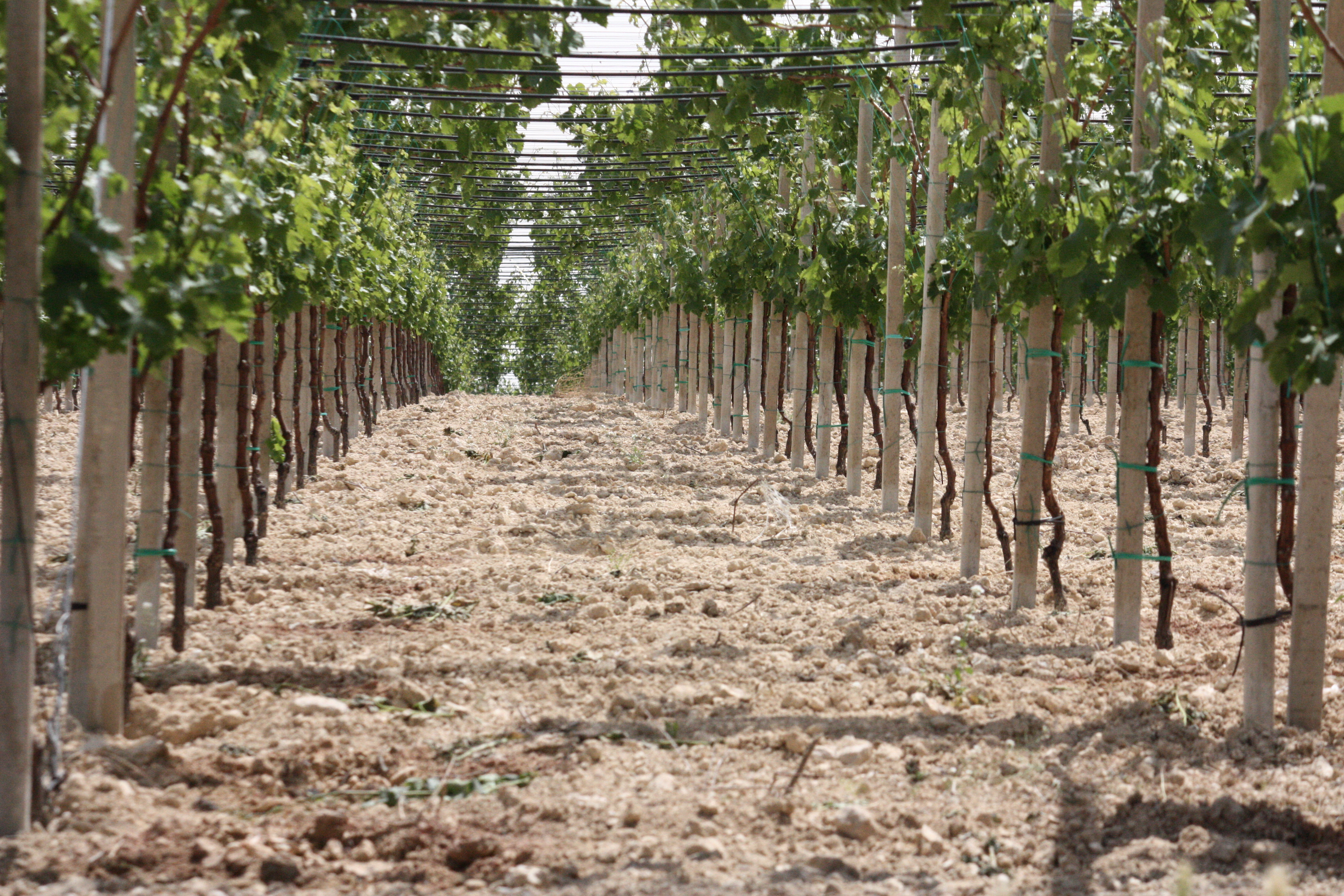
Awning vineyard in the countryside of Barletta

Vineyards cover 106,715 ha (263,700 acres) in Apulia, which is first place among Italian grape-growing regions. But in the production of quality DOC and DOCG wines, Apulia has only ranked 12th of 20 with 297,667 hl.

There are four DOCG wines:

- Castel del Monte Bombino Nero
- Castel del Monte Nero di Troia Riserva
- Castel del Monte Rosso Riserva
- Primitivo di Manduria Dolce Naturale

=== Oliviculture ===
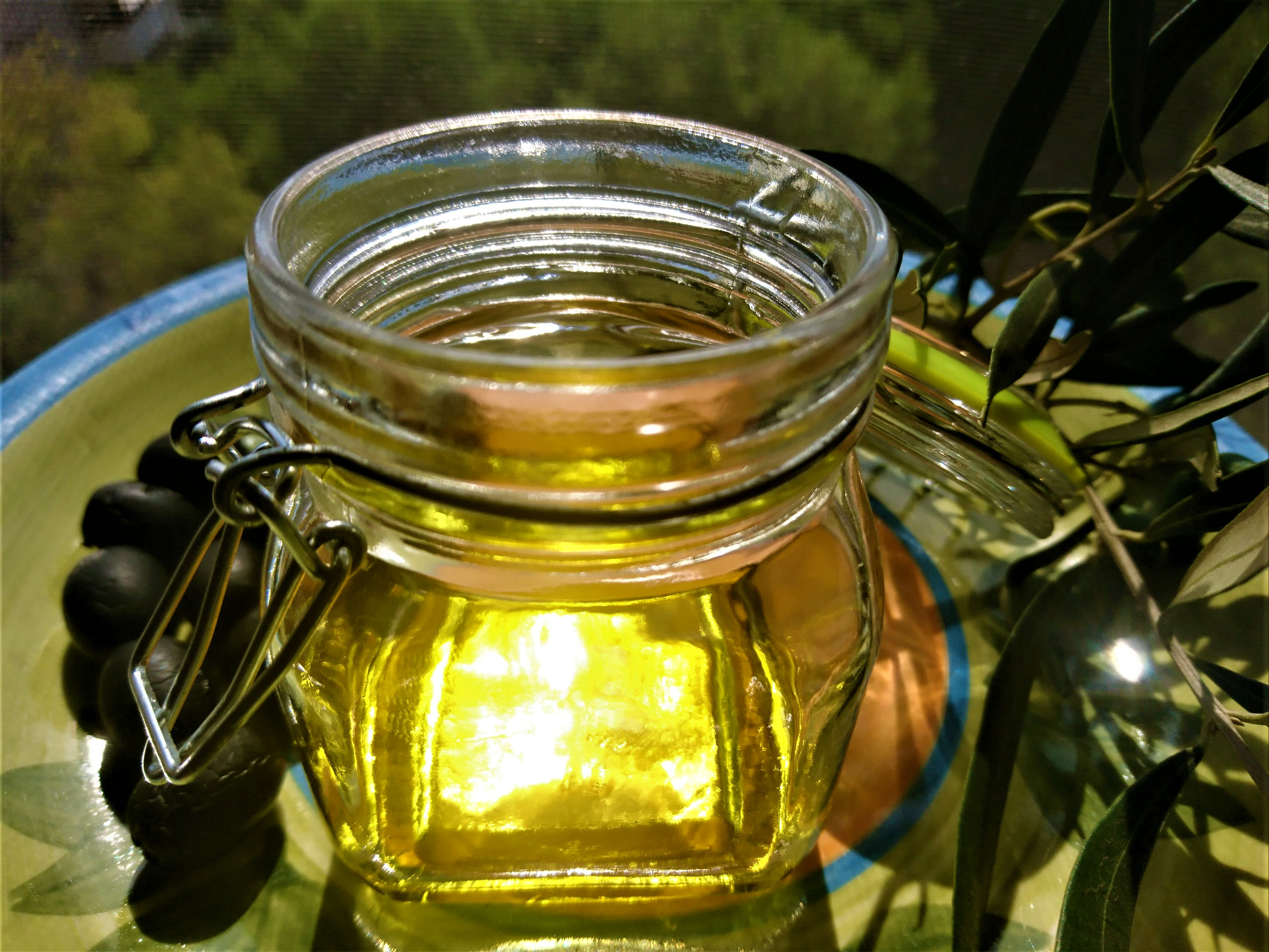
Terre Tarentine extra-virgin olive oil

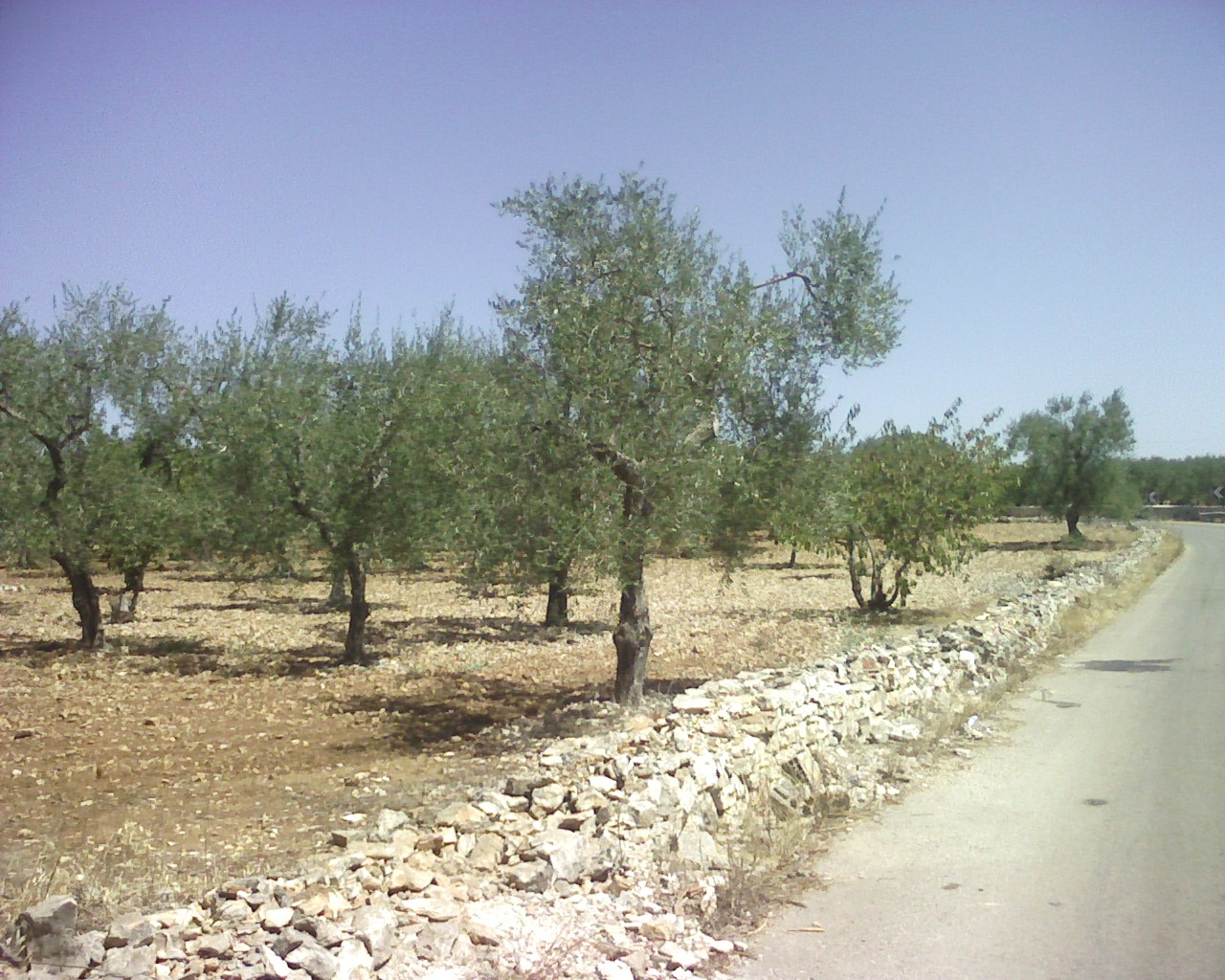
Olive trees near Modugno

There are an estimated 50 to 60 million olive trees in Apulia, and the region accounts for 40% of Italy's olive oil production. There are four specific Protected designations of Origin (PDO) covering the whole region. Olive varieties include: Baresane, Biancolilla, Brandofino (Castiglione), Buscionetto (Biancolilla), Carolea, Cellina di Nardò, Cerasuola (Ogliara), Cerignola (Bella di Cerignola), Cima di Bitonto, Cima di Mola, Coratina, also grown in Corning, California, a 2018 Gold Medal New York International Olive Oil Competition (NYIOOC) winner, Frantoio, Garganica, La Minuta, Leccino, Moresca, Nocellara Etnea, Nocellara Messinese, Ogliarola, Ogliarola Barese, Ogliara Messinese, Ottobratica, Peranzana, Rotondella, Santagatese, Saracena, Tonda Iblea, and Verdello (subspecies of San Benedetto).

==== Xylella fastidiosa disease ====
Since 2008–2010, the olive oil industry in Apulia has been under threat from the pathogen Xylella fastidiosa, a disease that inhibits the trees' uptake of water and nutrients. The epicentre of the epidemic is the southeastern part of the region.

=== Tourism ===
Apulia has many small and picturesque villages, 14 of them have been selected by I Borghi più belli d'Italia (English: The most beautiful Villages of Italy), a non-profit private association of small Italian towns of strong historical and artistic interest, that was founded on the initiative of the Tourism Council of the National Association of Italian Municipalities.

== Transport ==
The region has a good network of roads, but the railway network is less comprehensive, particularly in the south. There are no high-speed lines, but a high-speed line between Naples and Bari is under construction, which should be completed in 2027. The region is crossed northwest to southeast by the A14 highway (Bologna–Taranto), which connects the region's capital, Bari, to Taranto, the second most populous city in the region. The A14 also connects Foggia and points further north along the Adriatic coast to Pescara, Ancona, Rimini and eventually Bologna. The only other highway in the region is the A16 (Naples–Canosa), which crosses the Italian peninsula east–west and links the region with Naples.

There are two international airports, Karol Wojtyła Airport in Bari (IATA: BRI) and Brindisi Airport (IATA: BDS), which serve as the principal logistical hub for the United Nations Global Service Center headquartered in Brindisi. With the approval of a redevelopment project in 2018, the Grottaglie Airfield (IATA: TAR) will host a spaceport for the Italian Space Agency and Virgin Galactic.

== See also ==
- Catepanate of Italy
- Byzantine Italy
- Gravina in Puglia
- Daunian Mountains
- Gargano
- Grecia Salentina
- Iapygians
- Magna Graecia
- Messapians
- Sacra Corona Unita
- Salento
- Tavoliere delle Puglie
- Terra d'Otranto
- Trullo

== Sources ==
- Cosentino, Salvatore, ed. (2021). A Companion to Byzantine Italy. Boston-Leiden: Brill.
- Kreutz, Barbara M. (1996). Before the Normans: Southern Italy in the Ninth and Tenth Centuries. Philadelphia: University of Pennsylvania Press.
- Loud, Graham A. (1999). "Southern Italy in the tenth century". New Cambridge Medieval History. Vol. 3. Cambridge: Cambridge University Press. pp. 624–645.
- Peters, Edward; Foulke, William D., eds. (2003) [1907]. Paul the Deacon: History of the Lombards. Philadelphia: University of Pennsylvania Press.
- Wickham, Chris (1981). Early Medieval Italy: Central Power and Local Society, 400-1000. Totowa, NJ: Barnes & Noble.
