= Franco Cassano =

Italian sociologist and politician (1943–2021)

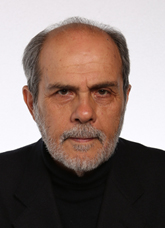
Franco Cassano, 2013

Franco Cassano (3 December 1943 – 23 February 2021) was an Italian sociologist and politician. He was full professor of Sociology and Sociology of Cultural and Communicative Processes at the University of Bari Aldo Moro, alongside his academic activity that of essayist and columnist. Among his best-known works Il pensiero meridiano (1996) and L'umiltà del male (2011). In the 2013 political elections he was elected deputy of the XVII legislature of the Italian Republic in the XXI Puglia constituency for the Democratic Party.

== Biography ==
He attends the Liceo Classico Liceo Classico Quinto Orazio Flacco in Bari. He began his university career in 1970 as an adjunct professor at the University of Messina. Since 1971 he has been assistant professor of Philosophy of Law at the University of Bari where, in 1980, he became full professor of Sociology of Knowledge. From 1991 to 1993 he directed the Italian Review of Sociology.

In the 1970s, Cassano was one of the main promoters of the so-called 'Bari school', an expression used to describe that flourishing period which relaunched Bari as a 'city of culture and ideas'. In addition to Cassano, other notable figures in this movement included the Gramscian historian and politician Giuseppe Vacca, the historian and classical philologist Luciano Canfora, the philosopher Biagio De Giovanni, the sociologist Giuseppe Cotturri (future director of the Center for State Reform Studies, founded by Umberto Terracini and later chaired by Pietro Ingrao and Stefano Rodotà), and the politician Giacomo Princigalli. The term 'Bari school' was coined by Felice Blasi in his text: Introduction to the École barisienne, Laterza-edizioni della libreria, Bari, 2007.

An integral part of the group of young scholars gathered around the university section of the PCI and the Laterza and De Donato publishing houses that in the 1970s engaged in Bari in a proposal for reform in a democratic and participatory sense of the forms of political organization inspired by Marxism, in the 1980s Cassano undertook a critique of modernity based on the deconstruction of its fundamentalisms: ethnocentrism, the cult of progress, speed, and the primacy of the market.

In 1996, his best-known work The Meridian Thought (translated into French, English, German and Japanese) renews the debate on the Southern question, claiming for the South the role of "subject of thought," that is, the right of the Souths to emancipate themselves from preconstituted evaluations that confine them to the frame of backwardness, in order to promote an autonomous vision that, far from indulging in self-absolution, knows how to identify the original contributions that the Southern perspective can make to a redefinition of the dominant economic and political models. Starting with a rebalancing of the process of European integration that knows how to contemplate the contribution brought as a dowry by the peoples facing the Mediterranean. The Mediterranean Sea, in fact, a "sea between lands" and never an impassable border, for Cassano represents a valid historical model of relationship with the Other, marked by measure, contamination and respect for differences.

In 2011 great debate was sparked by the thesis contained in The Humility of Evil, in which the author proposing an innovative rereading of the Legend of The Grand Inquisitor urges the left to abandon the "ethical aristocratism" in which it has allegedly taken refuge in recent years.

Long ill, he died in February 2021 at the age of 77.

Franco Cassano was also a film enthusiast. In fact, between 2001 and 2003, he supervised and financed Giovanni Princigalli's (one of his closest students) first film with research funds from the University of Bari. The documentary, Japigia Gagi, storie di rom (Japigia Gagi, stories of Roma people), was acclaimed at many anthropological and sociological film festivals, as well as documentary festivals. He is mentioned in several books on social sciences and cinema, such as: Seeing Cities Change: Local Culture and Class, Jerome Crase, Taylor & Francis edition, 2016 ; Italy's Margins Social Exclusion and Nation Formation Since 1861, David Forgacs, Cambridge University Press, 2014 ;Storia del documentario Italiano, Marco Bertozzi, Marsilio Editori, 2008 ;Il film etnografico in Italia, Francesco Marano, Edizioni di pagina, 2006.

In 2024, shortly after Cassano's death, Giovanni Princigalli dedicated his first feature film, the documentary "La canzone di Aida" (The Song of Aida), made twenty years later in the same community of Romanian Roma in Bari, to him.
