= Flacco =

Flacco is an Italian surname. Notable people with the surname include:

- Joe Flacco (born 1985), American football player
- Orlando Flacco, 16th century painter from Verona
- Tom Flacco (born 1994), American football player
- Flacco, alter ego of Australian comedian Paul Livingston (born 1956)

== See also ==
- Liceo Classico Quinto Orazio Flacco, the oldest secondary school in of Bari, Apulia, Italy, commonly known as the Flacco
- Flacco (c. 1790-1842), a chief of the Lipan Apache people, a Native American tribe
- Flaccus
