= Cerignola olive =

Olive cultivar

Cerignola
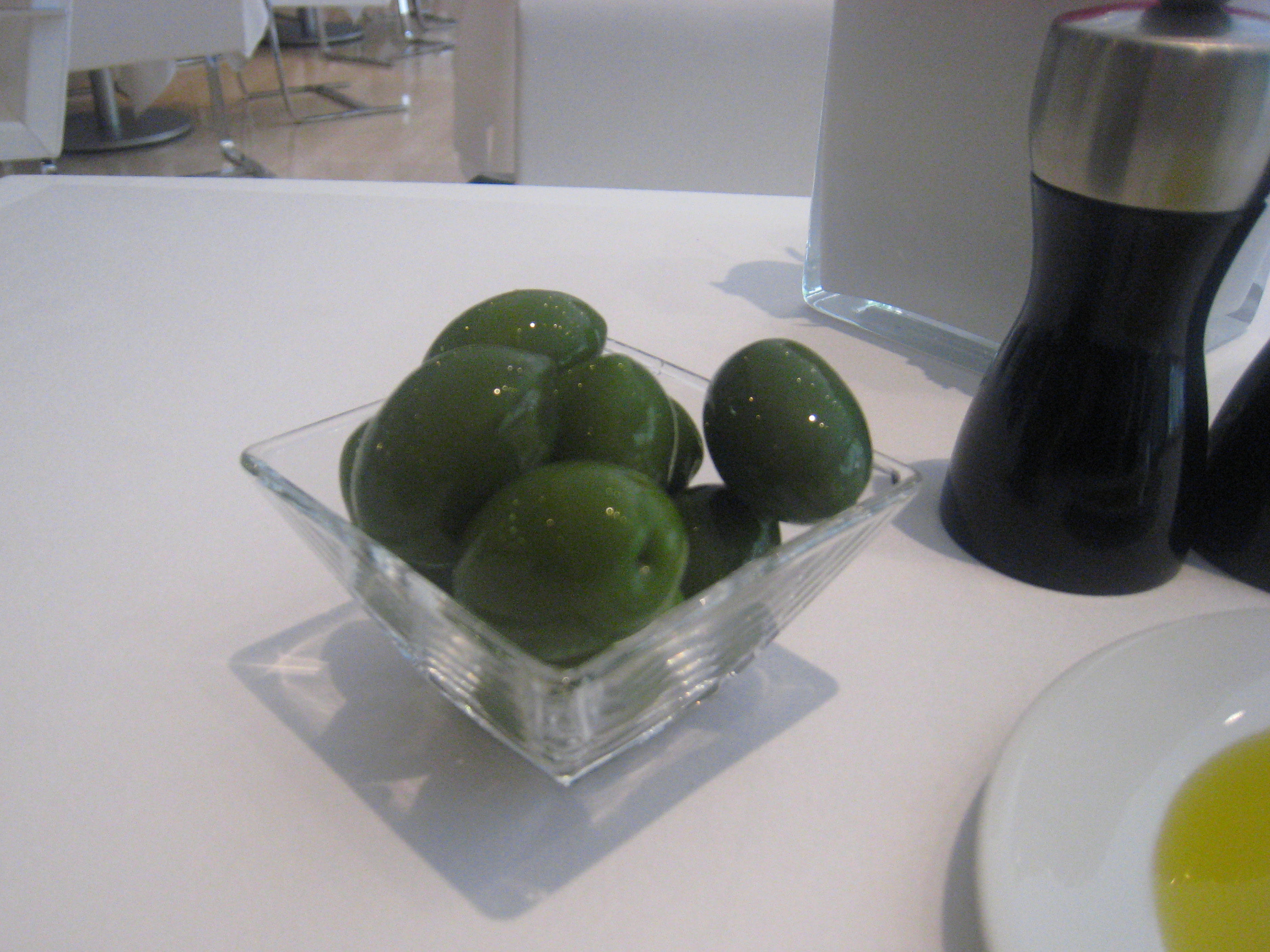

Olive (Olea europaea)
- Color of the ripe fruit: Olive Green
- Origin: Italy
- Use: Table

Cerignola, also known as Bella di Cerignola or Cerignola Pendola, is an olive cultivar from Italy.

Cerignola olives are large in relation to other olive varieties, and mild in flavor. While they are being cured, they may be left in their natural green color, treated to turn them black, or dyed bright red. The variety, which originates from the south-eastern Italian province of Apulia and is named for the town of Cerignola, is popular as table olives.

== Producers ==
In the production process, 40 different olive farms are responsible for seeding, growing and delivering the final product to the executive offices. These then move down the production line, first to one of the 4 businesses involved in the preparation of the ready to eat olives and another 4 distinct businesses involved in the packaging.
