= Troccoli =

Type of pasta

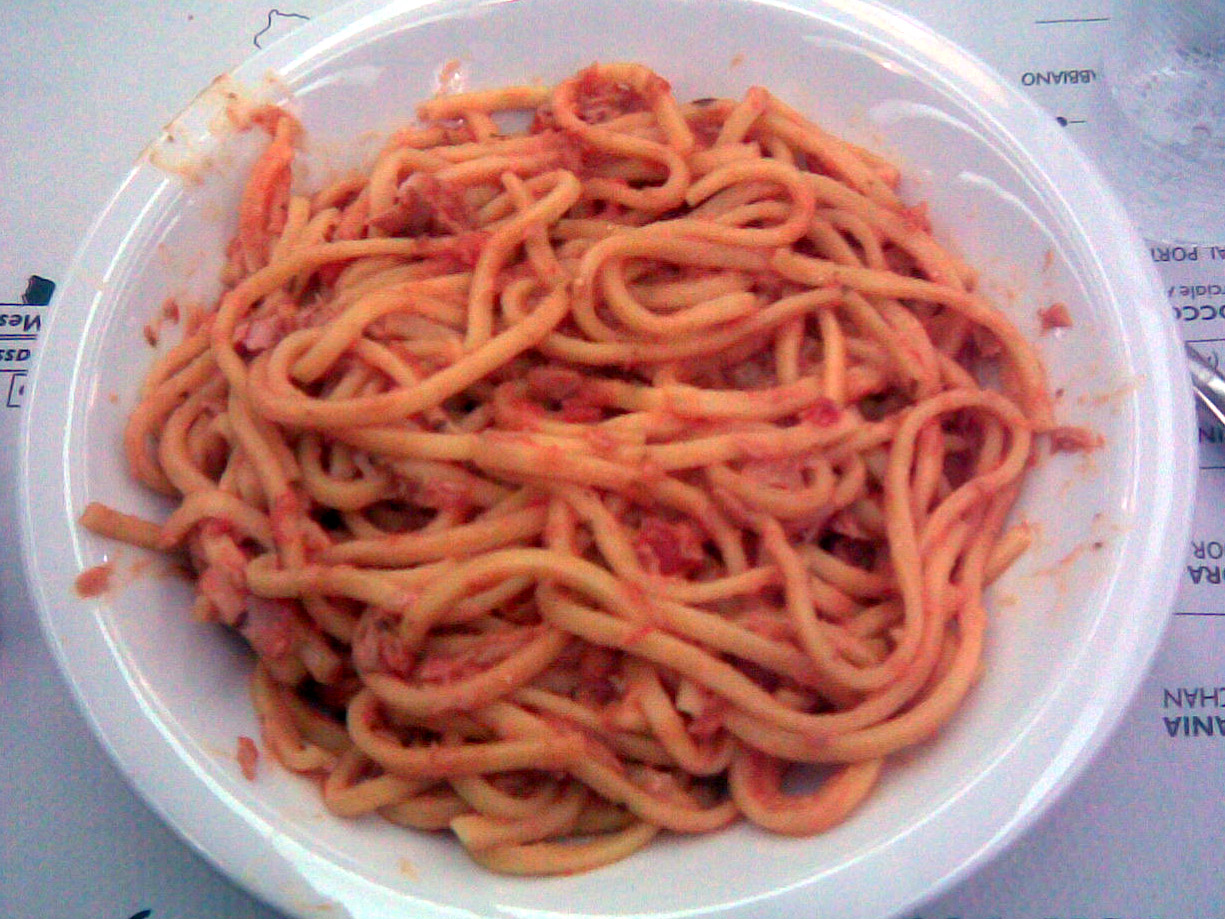
- Type: Pasta
- Place of origin: Italy
- Region or state: Apulia; Basilicata
- Main ingredients: Durum wheat flour, eggs (optional)

Troccoli (Italian: [ˈtrɔkkoli]) is a thick spaghetti-like pasta, featuring a square or oval cross section. It is typical of the Apulian and Lucanian cuisines and is often compared to spaghetti alla chitarra due to its ultimate shape, though the processing for making troccoli traditionally does not require the so-called chitarra, which in turn is a distinctive tool in the preparation of spaghetti alla chitarra.

== Description ==
Troccoli is a spaghetti-like pasta which is traditionally processed by the so-called troccolaturo or troccolo, a grooved rolling pin which cuts the dough into regular strips about 3–5 mm (0.12–0.20 in) thick; as a result of the pressure employed on the dough, the cross section of each strip will be either square or slightly oval, according to the shape of the grooves themselves (which can be either flat or pointy).

As for its ingredients, troccoli is basically made with durum wheat flour and water, with the optional addition of a few eggs—that is why it is sometimes associated with tagliolini and egg pasta as a whole.

=== The troccolaturo ===
The troccolaturo or troccolo is an old kitchen utensil in use for several centuries in Italy. In his Opera dell'arte del cucinare, published in 1570, Bartolomeo Scappi mentions this tool under the name of ferro da maccheroni ("macaroni iron") (Note: In times past, maccheroni used to be a generic term for several kinds of pasta, including spaghetti. Some regional expressions still keep this old meaning alive, as is the case with maccheroni alla chitarra (a synonym of spaghetti alla chitarra), maccheroncini alla Campofilone, maccaronara, etc.) and shows an engraving that clearly lends us an idea of what this kitchenware looked like in ancient times. It was basically a grooved rolling pin made of metal, though the metal was gradually replaced by hardwoods and today this tool comes in both materials, especially in beech wood or bronze. (Note: As is the case with food extrusion, a troccolaturo made of bronze produces a rougher surface on the dough: this is considered to give troccoli an improved taste, as a rough surface better retains pasta sauces.)

As for the etymology of nouns like troccolo or troccolaturo, they originate from Latin torculum (standard Italian: torchio or, in times past, torcolo), (Note: Both troccolo and troccolaturo are dialect terms rather than Standard Italian nouns (troccolaturo is simply an agent noun, cognate of Italian torchiatore).) which ultimately comes from the verb torquere ("to press") and refers to the press in the context of food processing: in this case, the press is manual rather than mechanical and is basically a rudimentary utensil to process food, especially suitable for homemade pasta. Troccoli itself is likely named after this kitchenware, though it might as well have a separate origin and refer to Latin torculum as the product of this food processing method, namely a pasta chip or truciolo di pasta in Italian: in this case, troccolo (here intended as singular for troccoli) would be a dialect variation of truciolo, as these words are actually cognates (i.e. they both originate from torculum). (Note: The Latin noun torculum has indeed originated two separate meanings: one referring to the subject executing the action (i.e. the press or torchio in Italian); the other one referring to the object undergoing the same action (i.e. the chip or truciolo that is "chipped off" by the pressure, so to speak).)

== See also ==
- List of pasta
