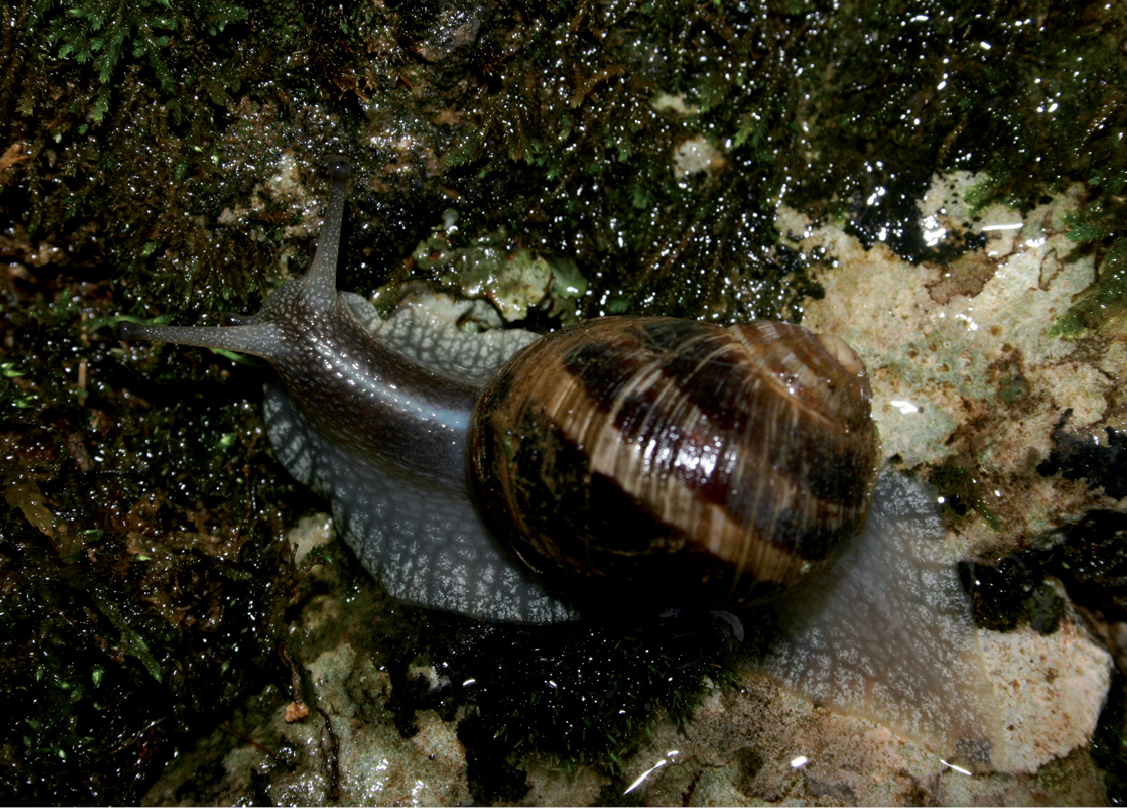

Scientific classification
- Kingdom: Animalia
- Phylum: Mollusca
- Class: Gastropoda
- Order: Stylommatophora
- Family: Helicidae
- Genus: Cantareus
- Species: C. subapertus

Binomial name
- Cantareus subapertus Ancey, 1893

Synonyms
- Helix mazzulopsis Pilsbry, 1893; Helix subaperta Ancey, 1893

= Cantareus subapertus =

Species of gastropod

Cantareus subapertus, is a species of air-breathing land snail in the family Helicidae that is native to the Algeria.
