= Sandro Teti Editore =

Sandro Teti Editore is an Italian publishing house founded in Rome in 2003 by Sandro Domenico Teti. The publishing house has a particular interest in the countries of the post-Soviet area from geopolitical, historical, and cultural perspectives.

For many years, Sandro Teti Editore curated and published one of the country's longest-running cultural magazines, Il calendario del popolo, founded in March 1945 and published by Nicola Teti Editore from 1964 to 2010.

== Series ==
Sandro Teti Editore publishes five series:

- Immagine, dedicated to the figurative arts (painting, photography, sculpture);
- Historos, directed by Luciano Canfora, a tool for exploring and understanding history without chronological or geographical limits, also considering less established points of view;
- I Russi e l’Italia, which focuses on the centuries-old Russian presence in Italy and Italians in Russia. The protagonists are figures from literature, art, music, politics, and diplomacy in both countries, who have helped create and strengthen ties between the two peoples;
- Zig Zag, founded by Mario Geymonat and currently directed by Vittorio Russo, which concentrates on fiction and poetry;
- Il Teatro della Storia, directed by Ada Gigli Marchetti, which offers a reinterpretation of historical events through theatre, promoting greater understanding and knowledge of the past.
