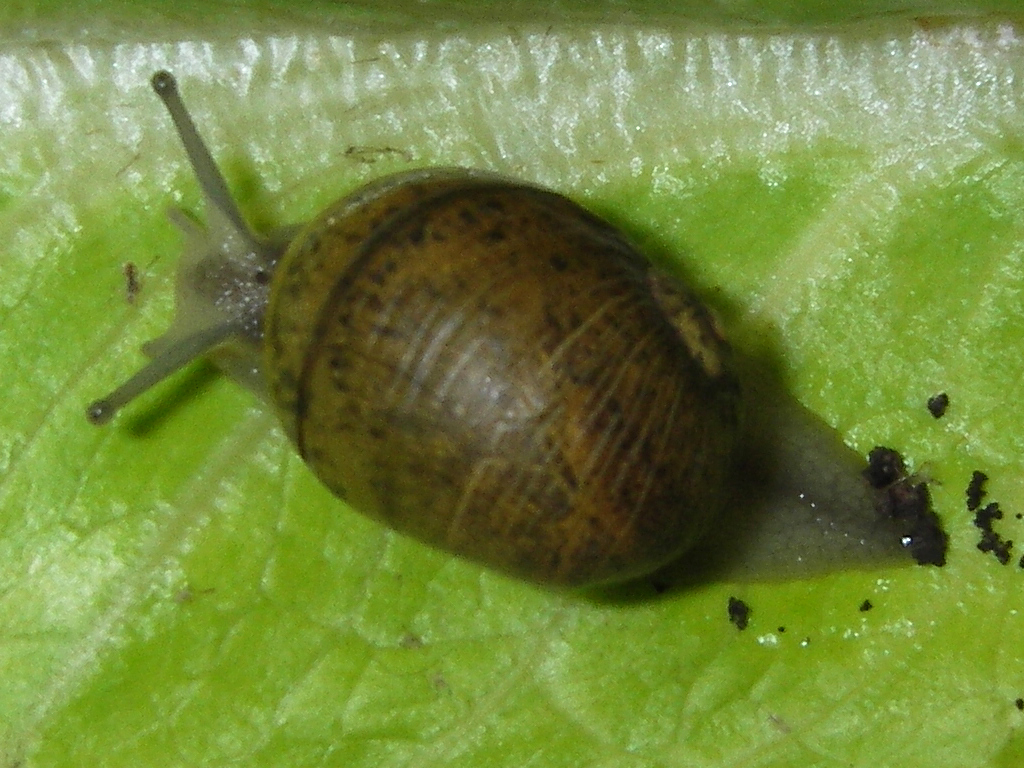
- Cantareus apertus

Scientific classification
- Kingdom: Animalia
- Phylum: Mollusca
- Class: Gastropoda
- Order: Stylommatophora
- Family: Helicidae
- Subfamily: Helicinae
- Tribe: Thebini
- Genus: Cantareus; Risso, 1826

Type species
- Helix naticoides Draparnaud, 1801

Synonyms
- Cantarelus Pallary, 1929 (unjustified emendation of Cantareus); Helix (Cantareus) Risso, 1826; Tapada Gray, 1840

= Cantareus =

Genus of gastropods

Cantareus is a genus of air-breathing land snails, a pulmonate gastropod in the family Helicidae, the typical snails.

Cantareus is a synonym for the genus Helix.

It contains the following species:

- Cantareus apertus (Born, 1778) synonym: Helix aperta
- Cantareus koraegaelius (Bourguignat in Locard, 1882)
- Cantareus subapertus (Ancey, 1893)

Species brought into synonymy

- Cantareus aspersus (O. F. Müller, 1774): synonym of Cornu aspersum (O. F. Müller, 1774) (superseded combination)
- Cantareus mazzullii synonym of Cornu mazzullii.
