= Flag of Apulia =

- Use: Civil and state flag
- Proportion: 2:3
- Adopted: 10 August 2001 (modified in 2011)
- Design: A white field with the words Regione Puglia ("Apulia Region") in gold letters at the top center, with the coat of arms of Apulia below; a green stripe towards the hoist-side, and a red stripe towards the fly-side.

The flag of Apulia is one of the official symbols of the region of Apulia, Italy. The current flag was adopted on 10 August 2001, but was modified in 2011 after the formation of the province of Barletta-Andria-Trani in 2009.

== Symbolism ==
The words Regione Puglia ("Apulia Region") appear in gold letters at the top of the flag. The coat of arms of Apulia, a shield atop a crown, is below the lettering. The shield, mounted by the crown of Frederick II, is composed of:

- Six bezants (coins) at the top, representing the six provinces of Apulia; prior to the creation of the province of Barletta-Andria-Trani in 2009, there were only five bezants;
- An octagon, representing the Castel del Monte built by Frederick II;
- An olive tree, a symbol of peace and brotherhood and a common feature of the Apulian countryside.

The stripes of green and red, set against the white background, are a reference to the national flag of Italy.

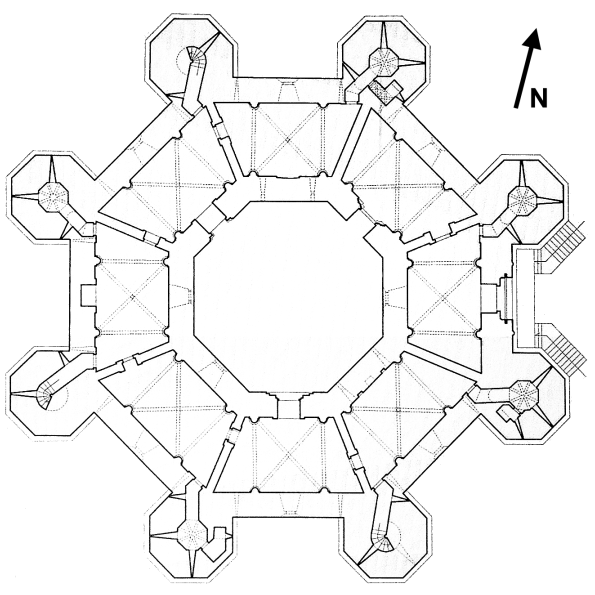
The octagonal plan of the Castel del Monte.
