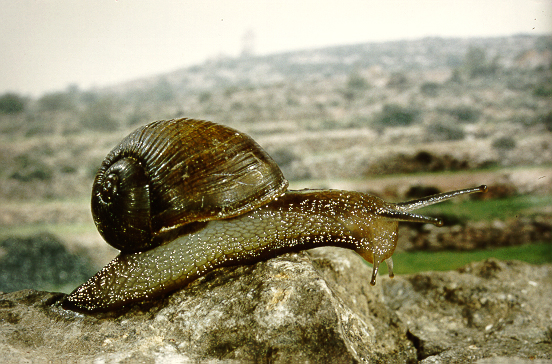
- Cantareus apertus in Gavdos, Greece

Conservation status
- Least Concern (IUCN 3.1)

- Secure (NatureServe)

Scientific classification
- Kingdom: Animalia
- Phylum: Mollusca
- Class: Gastropoda
- Order: Stylommatophora
- Family: Helicidae
- Genus: Cantareus
- Species: C. apertus

Binomial name
- Cantareus apertus (Born, 1778)

Synonyms
- Cornu apertus (Born, 1778) (superseded generic combination); Helix (Cantareus) apertus (Born, 1778); Helix aperta Born, 1778 (original combination); Helix naticoides Draparnaud, 1801 (junior synonym)

= Cantareus apertus =

Species of gastropod

Cantareus apertus, commonly known as the green garden snail, is a species of air-breathing land snail, a terrestrial pulmonate gastropod mollusc in the family Helicidae, the typical snails.

== Distribution ==
Cantareus apertus is native to Europe primarily near the Mediterranean Sea, and also North Africa.

Distribution of Cantareus apertus include:

- France west of Rhone estuary It is protected in France, must not be collected for commercial purposes.
- Islands in the Tyrrhenian Sea
- Italy, Italian Peninsula to Liguria and Romagna
- Ionian Islands
- Malta
- Central Greece
- Aegean Islands
- Cyprus (only one locality)
- Mediterranean north Africa

In Salento it is known as municeḍḍe and in Sicily as attuppateḍḍu.

It has also been introduced to other areas:

- It has become established in California and Louisiana.
- Western Australia – nonindigenous

This species is already established in the United States, and is considered to represent a potentially serious threat as a pest, an invasive species which could negatively affect agriculture, natural ecosystems, human health or commerce. Therefore, it has been suggested that this species be given top national quarantine significance in the USA.

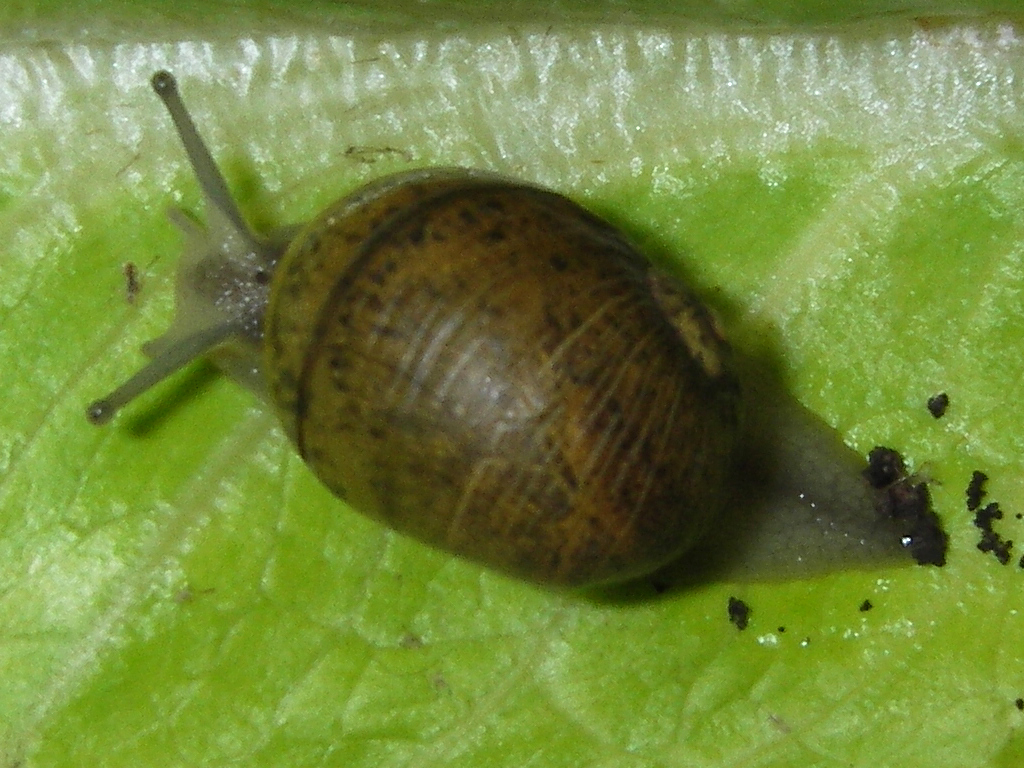
dorsal view of Cantareus apertus

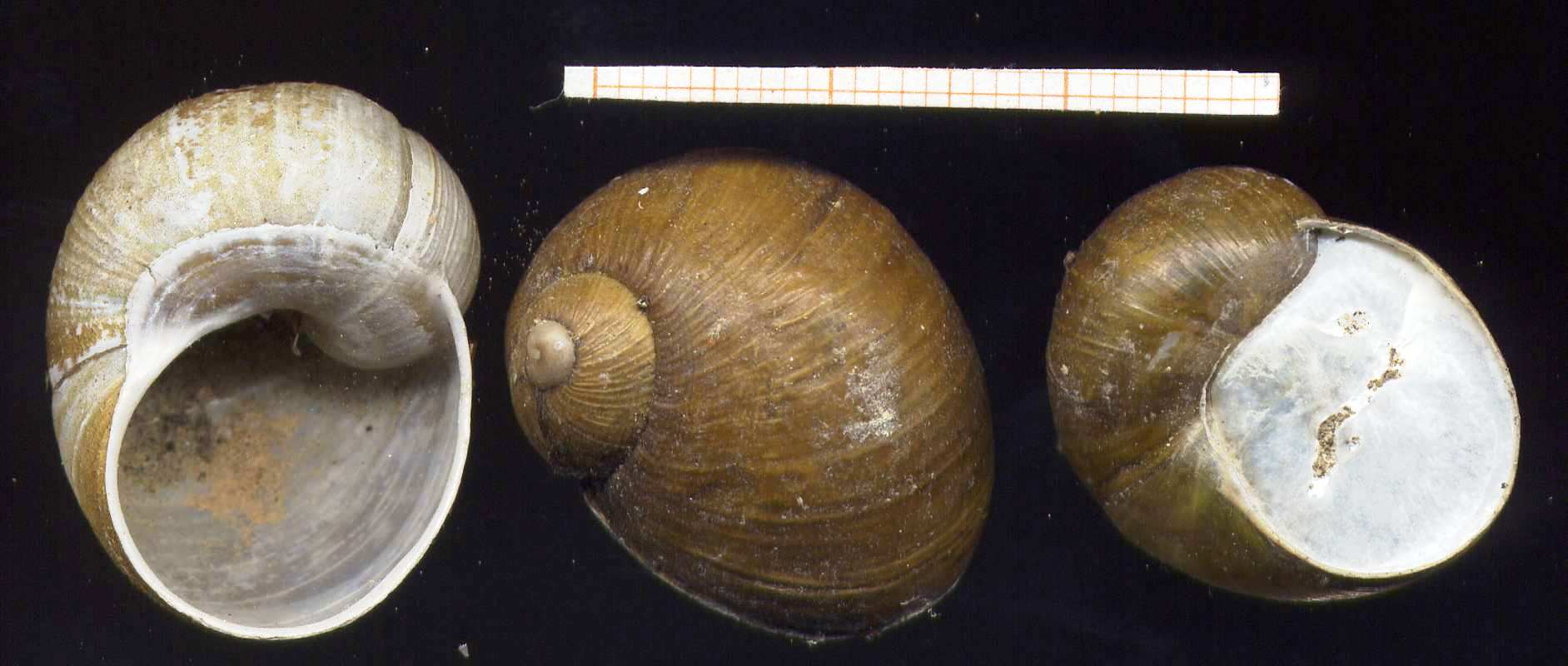
shells of Cantareus apertus

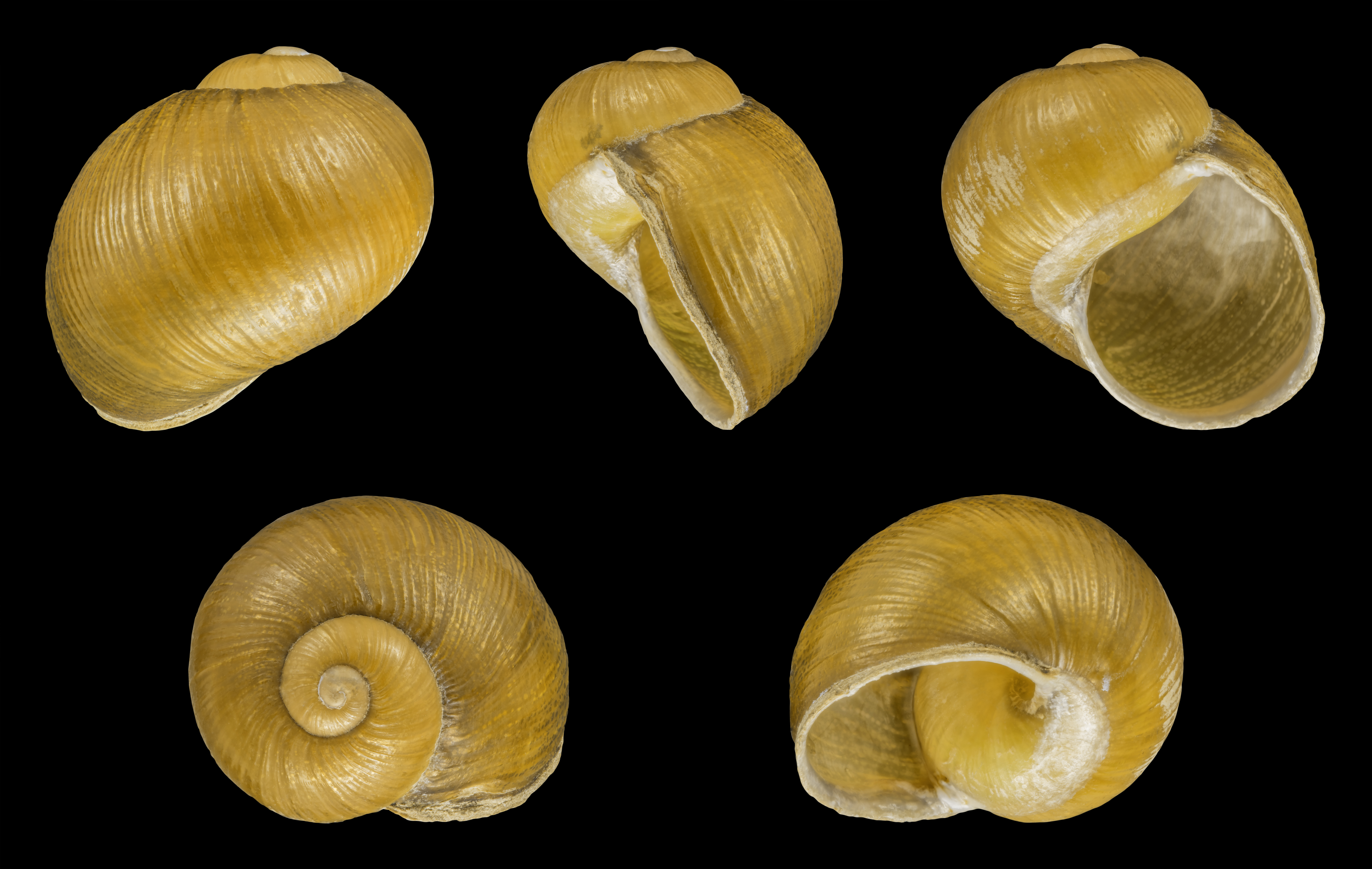
Five views of a shell of Cantareus apertus

== Description ==
The shell has a periostracum which is olive green in colour. The last whorl is much larger than the others. The width of the shell is 22–28 mm.; the height of the shell is also 22–28 mm.

== Ecology ==
Cantareus apertus inhabits Mediterranean shrublands, near cultivated fields, gardens. In Gavdos (Greece) also in woodland spreading on recently abandoned cultivated fields, more rarely in natural habitats.

In Crete this species is active for 3–4 months after the first rainfalls in October. It aestivates buried relatively deep in the soil. In hot, dry weather, it burrows three to six inches into the ground and becomes dormant until rain softens the soil. A white convex epiphragm is created for aestivation.

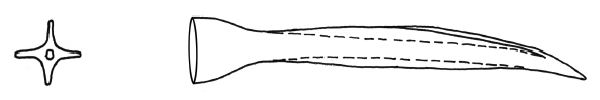
love dart of Cantareus apertus

This species of snail makes and uses love darts.
