= Liceo Classico Quinto Orazio Flacco =

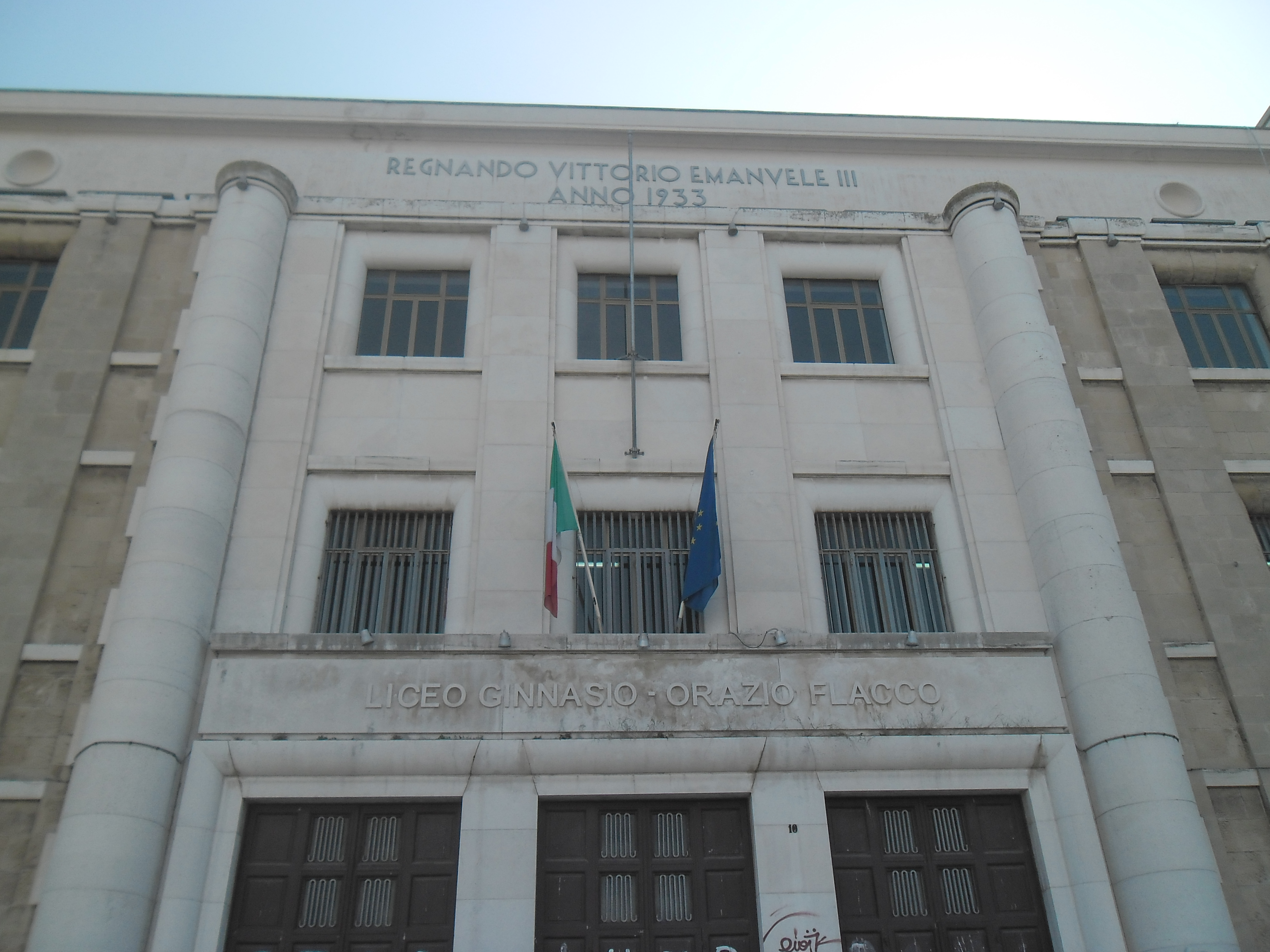

Liceo Classico “Quinto Orazio Flacco” is the oldest institution for secondary education in the city of Bari, Apulia, Italy. Commonly known as Flacco, this liceo classico welcomes students from 14 to 19 years of age. The scholastic environments (classrooms and offices) are still located in the original building, which was built along a stretch of Bari’s Lungomare in 1933.

== Education ==
A liceo classico is the oldest type of secondary school in Italy. The educational curriculum lasts for five years and it is particularly focused on the study of humanities. Today, the Flacco is commonly considered a highly formative school, also due to its singular characteristic of a broad teaching of ancient languages and traditional subjects as history and philosophy. In fact, the study of Latin and ancient Greek, along with their literature, is peculiar of this kind of institution.

However, in the past thirty years the Flacco has witnessed multiple changes in its didactics. Progressively, mathematics, informatics and sciences became an important part of the curriculum. Then, the study of the English language became mandatory for all the five years and a program specifically destined to history of art and archaeology became part of the school’s offerings. Audio and video materials were also integrated in the learning experience.

The course of studies is divided in two years of ginnasio (4th ginnasio and 5th ginnasio, which are technically a continuation of middle school) and three years of liceo (1st, 2nd and 3rd liceo). This denomination of the classes is different from any other type of school in Italy and it comes directly from the Gentile Reform, approved during the fascist regime. At the end of the five years, students must complete and pass the esame di maturità (Italian for “exam of maturity”) to obtain their certificate and go on to university.

== Quintus Horatius Flaccus ==
The Flacco is dedicated to the Latin author Quintus Horatius Flaccus, native of the Apulian city of Venosa. Usually known in the English-speaking world as Horace, he was the leading Roman lyric poet during the time of Augustus. His works were composed in elegant and serious hexameter verses and caustic iambic poetry. According to Quintilian, he was at times lofty, yet also full of charm and grace, and daring in his choice of words. He was politically active as a spokesman of Augustus’s regime. This was arguably the reason of his relative independence in his literary work, even though some think that all his arguments were in favor of the emperor and he was less more than a court slave.

== History ==
=== Origins ===
The Flacco finds its origins in the Regio Liceo delle Puglie, a scholastic institution founded in 1774 at the time of the Bourbon domination in Bari. In 1865, however, after the reunification of Italy into a kingdom and after the approval of a law that secularized education, the school changed name into Regio Liceo-Convitto “Domenico Cirillo”, a physician and a patriot during the revolution happened in Naples in 1799.

From 1885 until 1933 the liceo was located on the first floor of the building which hosts today the Ateneo (the University of Bari), with the exception of the years of World War I, when the building was used as hospital and the school moved to the Provincial Deputation in Via Melo da Bari.

=== Fascist Era and World War II ===
In 1933 the building that hosts today the liceo was built according to the project of architect Concezio Petrucci. A particular characteristic of this building is that it is shaped as an M, which was a direct reference to Benito Mussolini, dictator of fascist Italy. In fact, he financed the construction of brand new buildings on the Lungomare (Italian for “water front”) of Bari, including the Flacco, which has its monumental main entrance on Corso Vittorio Veneto, a street that runs along the coastline.

The first floor was occupied by the offices of secretariat, the presidency, the aula magna decorated with valuable bas-reliefs by sculptors Francesco Nagni and Amedeo Vecchi, the teacher’s library, the departments of physics, chemistry and natural sciences and a little amphitheater. The second floor instead hosted the classrooms and the students’ library. This composition is conserved nowadays, but a third floor was built during the 60s, along with a new wing which hides a little bit the original attempt of giving the building the shape of an M.

In 1935, after the reunion of the school’s board of directors, the name of the institution was changed from Domenico Cirillo to Quinto Orazio Flacco, the most famous Latin poet of Apulia. From 1943 until 1945, the original building was occupied by the Allied troops because of its strategic position with a view over the sea, and the school population was obligated to gather in spaces luckily found and available to the usage as meeting point for over 1200 students.

=== Modern Days ===
From the 1970s until present day, the liceo has experienced many variations from its traditional nature of humanistic high school in order to keep up with the national directives that gave more importance to sciences and foreign languages, particularly English. Today’s school’s motto is “innovation and tradition”, precisely because the liceo is interested in both educating students to be citizens of the modern, globalized, English-speaking, technology-oriented world, and maintaining the focus on those classical values that history, philosophy and ancient literature can teach.

== Notable alumni ==
In Bari, the Flacco carries the reputation of the school that shapes the minds of tomorrow’s leaders. And if a look at the ruling class of the city is taken (consisting of successful entrepreneurs, freelancers like lawyers and doctors, and politicians), this statement is actually found to be true. Many of these individuals come from a Flacco secondary education.

One of the Flacco’s most famous alumni is Michele Emiliano, president of Apulia and former mayor of Bari, important member of the Italian Democratic Party, and nationally known judge.

Another is Luciano Canfora, classical philologist, historian and essayist with a particular interest in law and in the preservation of the Italian constitution. His parents were both teachers at the Flacco for a long time. Today the teacher’s hall of the liceo is named after his father Fabrizio Canfora, historian of philosophy. Luciano Canfora’s books have an international audience and they are translated in more than ten languages.

Finally, there is Gianrico Carofiglio, former anti-mafia judge and successful novelist. In his books Né qui né altrove. Una notte a Bari (Italian for “Neither here nor anywhere else. A night in Bari”) and Il bordo vertiginoso delle cose (Italian for “The dizzy edge of things”) he mentions the Flacco as a city landmark of Bari. The second of these novels has actually the liceo as its setting.

== See also ==
- Bari
- Liceo Classico
- Latin
- Ancient Greek
- Gentile Reform
- Matura
- Horace
- House of Bourbon
- Domenico Cirillo
- Benito Mussolini
- Luciano Canfora
- Gianrico Carofiglio
