= Maria Celeste Nardini =

Italian politician (1942–2020)

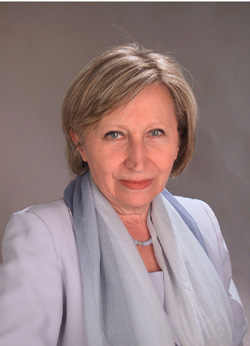

Senator of the Republic
- In office 28 April 2006 – 28 April 2008

Italian Chamber of Deputies
- In office 15 April 1994 – 27 April 2006

Personal details
- Born: 28 September 1942 Bari, Italy
- Died: 2 September 2020 (aged 77) Bari, Italy
- Party: PRC

Maria Celeste Nardini (28 September 1942– 2 September 2020) was an Italian politician who served as a Deputy and Senator.

== Biography ==
Elected for the first time to the Chamber of Deputies in 1994 for Rifondazione Comunista, she was confirmed the seat in 1996. In 2001, she was the first of the non-elected behind Nichi Vendola. She took the place of Montecitorio in 2005 once Vendola was elected President of the Puglia.

In 2006 she was nominated and elected Senator for the PRC in Puglia, in that legislature she was Secretary of the 9th Permanent Commission (Agriculture and agri-food production) and Member of the Parliamentary Commission for regional issues.
