= Luciano Canfora =

Italian classicist and historian (born 1942)

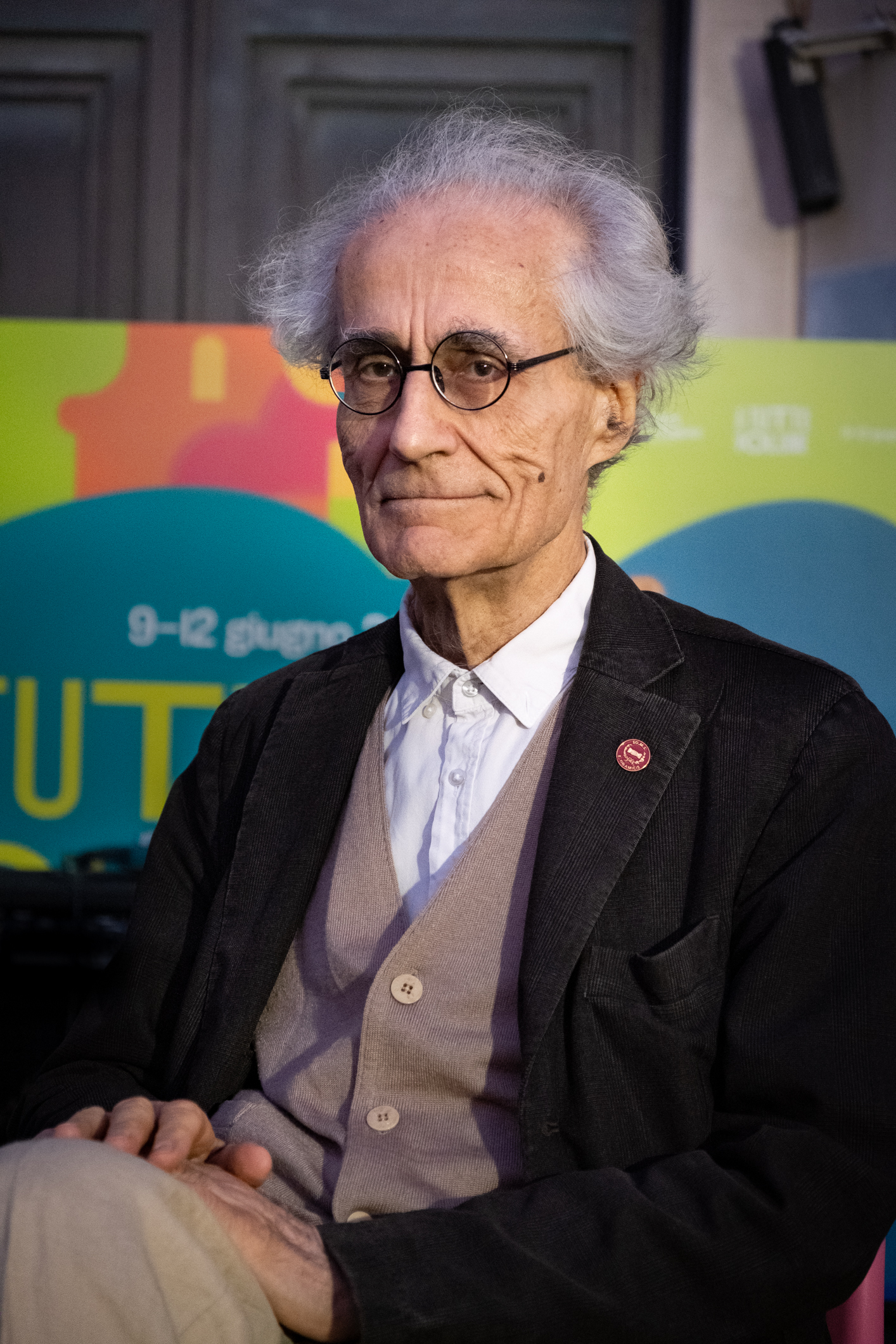
Canfora in June 2022

Luciano Canfora (Italian pronunciation: [luˈtʃaːno ˈkaɱfora]; born 5 June 1942) is an Italian classicist and historian who is professor emeritus of Classics at the University of Bari. Born in Bari, Canfora obtained his first degree in Roman History in 1964 at Pisa University. While his specialty is ancient libraries, he also wrote about Greek and Latin literature, philology, historiography, and politics, and his works have been translated into some 15 languages. In 1975, Canfora started to edit the periodical Quaderni di storia. In 1988, he joined the Italian Communist Party (PCI). After the dissolution of the PCI, he joined the Communist Refoundation Party (PRC) and the Party of Italian Communists (PdCI). He unsuccessfully stood in the 1999 European Parliament election for the PdCI.

== Early life and education ==
Canfora was born in Bari on 5 June 1942. Among Italy's leading philologists, a student of the historian of antiquity Ettore Lepore, he is the son of the historian of philosophy Fabrizio Canfora and the Latinist and Greek scholar Rosa Cifarelli, both professors at the Quinto Orazio Flacco high school in Bari, as well as anti-fascist protagonists of the city's cultural and civic life after World War II. His mother was sister of jurist and magistrate Michele Cifarelli, a former member of the Action Party, deputy and senator of the Italian Republican Party.

Canfora graduated in Humanities with a thesis in Roman history in 1964 and received his postgraduate degree in Classics from the Scuola Normale Superiore di Pisa. He began his university career as an assistant professor of ancient history and later of Ancient Greek literature. He is professor emeritus of Greek and Classics at the University of Bari and scientific coordinator of the Higher School of Historical Scuola Superiore di Studi Storici di San Marino.

== Career ==
Canfora is a member of the editorial boards of several journals, both scientific and high popularization, such as Boston's Journal of Classical Tradition, Spain's Historia y crítica, and Italy's geopolitical journal Limes. He is a member of the Fondazione Istituto Gramsci, as well as of the scientific committee of the Encyclopedia Treccani. Since 1975, he began to direct the journal Quaderni di Storia, the text series La città antica at the publisher Sellerio, the Paradosis series for Dedalo editions, and the Historos series for Sandro Teti Editore. Canfora is a prolific author on philology, history, and politics from ancient to contemporary times. Many of his books have been translated in the United States, France, the United Kingdom, Germany, Greece, the Netherlands, Brazil, Spain, the Czech Republic, Slovenia, Romania, Russia, Turkey, and the United Arab Emirates. He is an elzevirista for the Corriere della Sera and contributes to Il Calendario del Popolo, on which he has a regular column titled "Brother Babeuf".

Canfora coordinated and directed, together with Diego Lanza and Giuseppe Cambiano, Lo spazio letterario della Grecia antica for Salerno editore (1992–1996), a collective work on the different characters of Greco-antique philology, Ancient Greek literature, and its persistence. Top Italian experts in Greek philology and history of literature contributed to this work. In 2011, he received the Militant Criticism section the Feronia-City of Fiano Prize. In 2020, Canfora won the historical scientific section of the Acqui Award of History.

== Works ==
=== The Vanished Library (1989) ===
In 1989, Canfora published in English The Vanished Library, which is about the Library of Alexandria.

=== Togliatti e Stalin. Il PCI e la politica estera staliniana negli archivi di Mosca (1998) ===
In 1998, Canfora published a rebuttal of Elena Aga Rossi and Victor Zaslavsky's work, Togliatti e Stalin. Il PCI e la politica estera staliniana negli archivi di Mosca, about criticism of Palmiro Togliatti and the PCI and their relations with Joseph Stalin and the Soviet Union. Canfora described the book by Aga Rossi and Zaslavsky as "a vibrant pamphlet that exploits some documents, rhapsodically selected and mostly already known, with the very firm intention of demonstrating a single assumption: that the PCI's policy was always and totally subordinate to Stalin's directives." According to Canfora, what he described as the prejudicial anti-communism of the book reached, in his own words, an "exhilarating aspect" when the two authors accused the PCI of an insurrectionist drift. He stated that the party considered the possibility of reacting with arms only if the United States "had intervened to prevent the imminent political elections" of April 1948. Since he said the thesis of Aga Rossi and Zaslavsky was that "communism is evil", a PCI that would have tried to defend itself and not to be overwhelmed did nothing but practiced evil, and critically wrote: "Rarely had one fallen so low in a self-styled book of history."

Regarding the Salerno Turn, Aga Rossi and Zaslavskij argued that the occupying Allied powers would have supported the National Liberation Committee (CLN) government, which would have removed Badoglio from power, ignoring, according to Canfora, "how tenaciously the English government supported the King and Badoglio". By reconstructing the story and downsizing Togliatti's role, Canfora argued that Aga Rossi and Zaslavskij arrived at a result that they did not intend: the one for which Stalin was "gigantic in diplomatic ability, farsightedness, and moderation". Canfora's conclusion was that if the authors "had really intended to do the noble job of scholars of history", they would have tried to understand the reasons for Togliatti's oscillations on such a tormented political choice, writing that "if they hadn't chosen to reduce the characters that affair, either to mere tools or to evil geniuses, would perhaps have had the result that a historian should care most about: understanding."

=== La democrazia. Storia di un'ideologia (2004) ===
In 2004, Canfora published La democrazia. Storia di un'ideologia, which is about the history of democracy.

== Political views ==
Already a militant for some years in the Proletarian Unity Party (PdUP), Canfora joined the PCI in 1988. After the Bolognina turning point, he adhered to the third motion proposed by Armando Cossutta (For a Socialist Democracy in Europe), being elected to the party's central committee. A few months after the subsequent dissolution of the PCI, he joined the PRC. Canfora was a candidate for the 1999 European Parliament election in Italy on the list of the PdCI in the Northwestern, Central, and Southern Italy constituencies, without being elected. After the dissolution of PdcI, he was a "communist without a party". In the 2016 Italian constitutional referendum, he supported the side opposed to the constitutional reform of the Renzi government. In the 2018 Italian general election, he supported the left-wing Free and Equal electoral list and candidate Michele Laforgia in the Bari single-member constituency. In a 2019 interview, he said he has always been a proletarian internationalist.

== Selected bibliography ==
- Canfora, Luciano (1989). The Vanished Library. London: Hutchinson Radius. ISBN 978-0-09-174049-8. OCLC 19847537.
- Canfora, Luciano (1998). Togliatti e i critici tardi (in Italian). Rome: Teti. ISBN 978-8-8703-9781-9.
- Canfora, Luciano (2004). La democrazia. Storia di un'ideologia (in Italian). Bari: Editori Laterza. ISBN 978-8-8420-7298-0.
