= Celle di San Vito =

Celle di San Vito Cèles de Sant Vuite (Arpitan)
- Comune
- Comune di Celle di San Vito
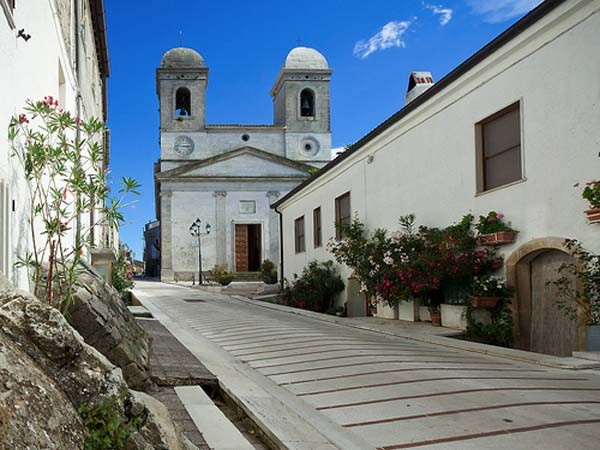
- The parish church, Celle di San Vito

- Location within Italy Location within Apulia
- Coordinates: 41°19′32″N 15°10′51″E
- Country: Italy
- Region: Apulia
- Province: Foggia (FG)

Area
  - Total: 18.41 km^{2} (7.11 sq mi)

Population (2026)
  - Total: 143
  - Density: 7.77/km^{2} (20.1/sq mi)
- Demonym: Cellesi
- Time zone: UTC+1 (CET)
  - Summer (DST): UTC+2 (CEST)
- Postal code: 71020
- Dialing code: 0881
- ISTAT code: 071019
- Patron saint: San Vincenzo Ferreri
- Saint day: 13 August
- Website: Official website

Celle di San Vito (Arpitan: Cèles de Sant Vuite, IPA: [ˈsɛləs də ˈsɑ̃t ˈvɥit]) is a village and comune (municipality) in the Province of Foggia in the region of Apulia in southern Italy. Located upon the Daunian Mountains, with a population of 143, Celle di San Vito is by far the least populous municipality in Apulia.

Celle di San Vito borders the municipalities of Biccari, Castelluccio Valmaggiore, Faeto, Orsara di Puglia, and Troia.

== Demographics ==
As of 2026, the population is 143, of which 48.3% are male, and 51.7% are female. Minors make up 11.2% of the population, and seniors make up 36.4%.

Unlike the residents of many bordering towns (Biccari, Castelluccio Valmaggiore, Orsara di Puglia and Troia), people of Celle di San Vito and the neighboring village of Faeto speak Faetar, a rare daughter language of the Franco-Provençal language which has fewer than 1,000 known speakers. The town's language is also represented in Brantford, Ontario, where many immigrants from Celle di San Vito settled beginning in the early 20th century and over 2,000 Brantford area residents have ties to Celle di San Vito.

Historical population

Year	Pop.	±%
1861	1,010	—
1871	919	−9.0%
1881	1,050	+14.3%
1901	1,041	−0.9%
1911	941	−9.6%
1921	753	−20.0%
1931	757	+0.5%
1936	799	+5.5%

Year	Pop.	±%
1951	795	−0.5%
1961	641	−19.4%
1971	429	−33.1%
1981	319	−25.6%
1991	297	−6.9%
2001	186	−37.4%
2011	172	−7.5%
2021	147	−14.5%

Source: ISTAT

=== Immigration ===
As of 2025, immigrants make up 5.6% of the total population. The foreign countries of origin are Romania, Albania, Germany, and the United Kingdom.
