= Panni, Apulia =

Panni
- Comune
- Comune di Panni
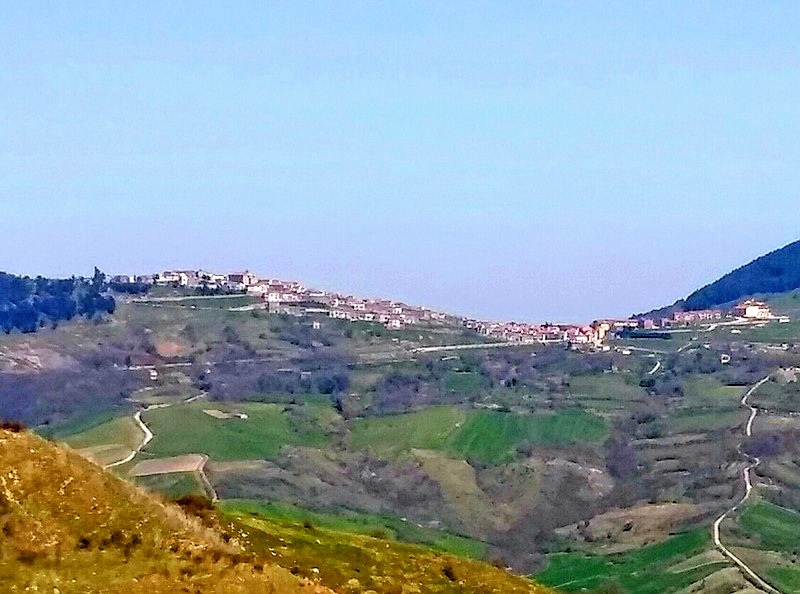
- View of Panni

- Location within Italy Location within Apulia
- Coordinates: 41°13′N 15°16′E
- Country: Italy
- Region: Apulia
- Province: Foggia (FG)

Area
  - Total: 32.59 km^{2} (12.58 sq mi)
- Elevation: 801 m (2,628 ft)

Population (30 November 2020)Dato Istat
  - Total: 705
  - Density: 21.6/km^{2} (56.0/sq mi)
- Demonym: Pannesi
- Time zone: UTC+1 (CET)
  - Summer (DST): UTC+2 (CEST)
- Postal code: 71020
- Dialing code: 0881
- Patron saint: San Costanzo
- Saint day: 26 August
- Website: Official website

Panni (Irpino: Pànne) is a village and comune in the province of Foggia in the Apulia region of southeast Italy.

== Geography ==
The town of Panni is located on the top of Monte Sario (Mount Sirius), at 801 m a.s.l. in the Daunian Mountains. The municipal area is between the valley of the Avella stream, which forms the western border with the municipality of Savignano Irpino and that of the Iazzano stream, which runs on the eastern border with the municipality of Bovino. Both the Avella and the Iazzano are tributaries of the Cervaro River that delimits the municipal territory to the north, separating it from that of the town of Montaguto. The southern border is instead delimited by some rugged mountainous reliefs belonging to Monte Crispignano. The hill position ensures a cool climate in summer, which makes Panni a destination for vacationers from all over the surrounding area, locally known and named the Capitanata.

"When the heat is burning down in the Tavoliere, up in the Pan plateau you can enjoy the coolness." (E. Passarelli)

== Etymology ==
In the late Middle Ages, the village was mentioned as Pandi or Panda. The origins of the name would refer, by popular tradition, to that of the Greek god Pan, who also appears in the coat of arms of the town. According to some, it could also derive from the Samnite divinity of the crops: Panda (Patana Pistia), which was related to Ceres, if not the same divinity. Other possible derivations come from the Germanic or Lombard Pando, or from the Latin adjective pandus (curved), to refer to some element of the landscape, has also been proposed.

== History ==
The first mention of Panni is in land registry documents of 1406. In 1494, the short-lived Alfonso II of Naples gave it to Parretto de Ponte and Giovanna de Orenga. The town was historically inhabited by Arbëreshë community, who have since assimilated.

Since prehistoric times (with findings from the Middle Paleolithic) the Cervaro Valley was an essential passage through the Italian peninsula between the Adriatic and the Tyrrhenian seas. The valley between Bovino (Vibinum) and Savignano Irpino (Sabinianum) constituted - by the local population - a critical point of easy control against invaders. In 109 A.D. the emperor Trajan promoted the construction, on an older route, of the Trajan Consular Road which connected Benevento to Brindisi. The first text on the history of the town is Giuseppe Procaccini's "Historical notes on the land of Panni". This book, although dated, contains many of the important information for a truly difficult historical reconstruction, for a battered town from disastrous earthquakes.

On the external walls of the mother church, Maria Santissima Dell' Assunta, there are traces of frescoes and graffiti ranging from the late Republican Roman period to the early Christian period ( the 1st century BC to the 4th century AD), as evidenced by recent discoveries.

Although inhabited at least since Roman times, the oldest written documents have been found in the State Archives of Foggia and in the National Library of Naples and date back to the year 1118 A.D.

In the village there are few but important traces as a Templar settlement (XII-XIII century). Such evidence is on a door that is mainly Romanesque and has decorations on its portals, with the presence of baphomet, griffins and graffiti.

It was ruled by the Spaniards and was part of the Fiefdom of the Guevara family, until the unification of Italy in 1867, which saw the town among the great opponents of the Piedmontese. Although a land of banditry, the town sacrificed many of its inhabitants to its homeland in the two world wars, and suffered various migratory flows, mainly towards the Americas, as well as in Australia and Europe (20th century) and towards other parts of Italy (from 1960 until the present).

== Monuments and Memorials ==
=== Religious Architecture ===
Dedicated to the Blessed Virgin Mary Assumed into Heaven, the Mother Church is the most important Pannese monument. The church houses a white Renaissance marble statue of the Virgin of Loreto, a baptismal font, also in white marble, two eighteenth-century altarpieces, statues of the saints and some altarpieces from more recent eras as well as the Adoration chapel. Along the external wall of the bell tower there are some early Christian graffiti, while inside there are others from the Templar period. The other churches in the town are those of San Vito and San Pietro (locally called “del Purgatorio”). To these must be added the modest little Church of Calvary (locally called the Church of the Five Crosses). In the municipal territory of Panni there is also the sanctuary of the Madonna del Bosco with an adjoining monastery, dating back to 1503. The complex, located at the foot of Monte Crispignano, would have welcomed Saint Alfonso de Liguori on his travels between Campania and Apulia.

=== Military Architecture ===
In the upper part of the historic center there is a panoramic walk, called 'Il Castello'. Along this pedestrian path on the crest of Monte Sario, the remains of a wall of a watchtower, constructed during the Spanish occupation, from the early sixteenth century stand out (in local dialect called "Lu Zitemelòne "), within which a small window has been carved. The tower has been reconstructed several times due to earthquakes over the centuries and the form seen today is what has remained throughout modern years. This promontory is well known by many of the area for its views and by para gliders due to the consistent winds that blow from the north-east and can be seen over the town during spring and summer. From this height, one can look north to the isolated mountain massif of the Gargano, made of a highland and several peaks and forming the backbone of the Gargano Promontory projecting into the Adriatic Sea, the "spur" on the Italian "boot" and east to the provincial capital city of Foggia and its plain and further to the port city of Manfredonia, the Gulf of Manfredonia and the Adriatic Sea.

=== Civil Architecture ===
==== A glimpse of Panni ====
Some ancient fountains around Panni date back several centuries and have various medieval and Renaissance inscriptions (they are Fontana di Sant'Elia, Fontana di Mata, Fontana Vecchia, Fontana Nuova, Fontana Alambicco). Also interesting is the war memorial with a bronze statue of Victory holding a flame, which is to resemble the American Statue of Liberty in form. The architectural keystones of the portals [9] are interesting, the result of the artistic skills of the Pannesi stonecutters, handed down over the centuries.

==== Natural areas ====
The municipal area of Panni extends between two areas: Monte Crispignano, one of the highest in Apulia, and the Cervaro Valley, rich in greenery and water. A large equipped wooded area extends around the sanctuary of the Madonna del Bosco.

==== Archaeological sites ====
Some archaeological finds (Monte Crispignano, Valle dell'Avella, La Serra), in the municipal area of Panni, there have been uncovered noteworthy finds, such as jewels and coins from the 2nd century BC, the remains of a small temple and some funerary sites from the 3rd century BC. The exploratory excavation of the "La Serra" site is of considerable importance.

== Languages and Dialects ==
Alongside the Italian language, the Dauno-Irpino dialect is used in the town of Panni.

== Traditions and Folklore ==
The patronal festivals are held on 26 and 27 August and are dedicated to the two patrons of Panni: San Costanzo martyr and the Madonna del Bosco. Of particular importance is the 'Festa della Spiga’, in local dialect was named Festa delle Salme, (Festival of the Wheat Harvest) on 15 August. Folklore has a gnome like creature, that lives in the fissure below the foundations of the watch tower, Lu Zitemelòne, when caught must give up its hoard of riches.

== Health and Security ==
A public hospital unit is in Panni, where medical, nursing and rehabilitation assistance is provided. The town is policed by the local municipal bylaw officer and the Carabinieri, a national police group, which has a “caserma” or station, located in town.

== Economy ==
The local economy is essentially based on agri-pastoral activities, of typical local products; on personal services (assistance to the elderly and the disabled) and, to a lesser extent, on the tourism/hospitality sector.

== Transport ==
Panni is connected by a provincial road, the SP-121, to the state road 90 of Apulia (7 km from the town) which ensures connections with Foggia and Campania. By car or bus from Foggia: Ss 90 (aka 'Via Napoli'), about 42 km (+ 7 km of SP 121), towards Naples. From Naples: A16, Grottaminarda exit, then Ariano Irpino, along the SS 90, for about 37 km (+7) towards Foggia. From Bari: A16, Vallata exit, 20 km towards Monteleone-Panni The railway station is that of Montaguto-Panni, located 7 km from the town in the valley below and served by the Naples-Foggia line. It no longer has passenger service.

== Sport Teams ==
The A.S.D. Panni, founded in 2013, has been playing for a year in the Third Campania Category. The home matches of the "pomegranate coloured" team are played at San Costanzo, a sports field in the town. In the 2015/16 season the team finished second in the standings, participated in the playoffs and won, thus going to the second division.

In 2019, the A.S.D. Panni is not registered at FIGC competition.

== Sister cities ==
- (United States) Johnston, Rhode Island
