= Monte Cornacchia (Daunian Mountains) =

Mountain in Italy

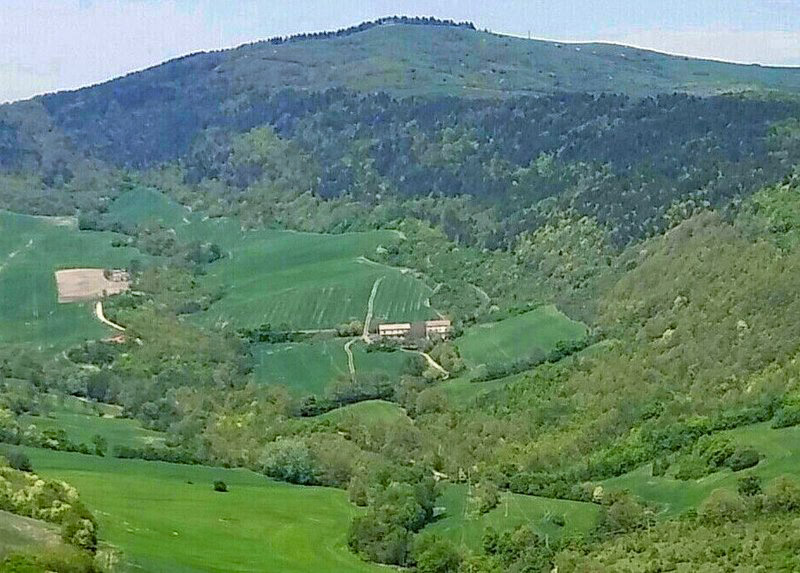
- Monte Cornacchia viewed from Faeto

Highest point
- Elevation: 1,151 m (3,776 ft)
- Prominence: 558 m (1,831 ft)
- Isolation: 44.62 km (27.73 mi)
- Listing: List of Italian regions by highest point
- Coordinates: 41°21′44″N 15°9′23″E

Geography
- Location within Italy
- Location: Apulia, Italy
- Parent range: Daunian Mountains (Southern Apennines)

Monte Cornacchia is a mountain of the Apennine Mountains located in the western internal sector of the province of Foggia. It is the highest peak in the Daunian Mountains and the Apulia region.

== Description ==
Cloaked in woods and pastures, Mount Cornacchia is located on the border between the municipalities of Biccari and Faeto. Along the northern slopes of the hill, the sources of the Vulgano stream gush out with some hydrocarbon deposits as well as Lake Pescara, the only natural mountain lake in Apulia (located at 902 m, extending over 3 hectares and 6 m deep). The southern side opens into a wide valley, the Valmaggiore, crossed by the Celone stream and populated by the only Franco-Provençal minority in Apulia.

From the top of the mountain, reachable via a carriage road, there is a vast landscape including the Gargano, the Tavoliere, the Irpinia, the Matese and the Maiella. A few meters from the summit, there is a refuge built in 1980 and then reactivated in 2012 after a fire devastated it in 2007. By virtue of its considerable ecological importance, the entire massif of Mount Cornacchia, together with the contiguous forest of Faeto, is a site of community interest.
