= Montaguto =

- Comune
- Comune di Montaguto
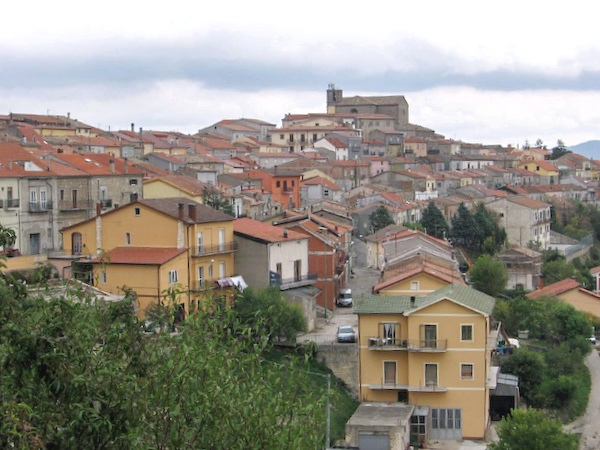

- Location within Italy Location within Campania
- Coordinates: 41°14′59″N 15°14′57″E
- Country: Italy
- Region: Campania
- Province: Avellino (AV)

Government
  - Mayor: Marcello Zecchino

Area
  - Total: 18.38 km^{2} (7.10 sq mi)
- Elevation: 730 m (2,400 ft)

Population (31 March 2017)
  - Total: 418
  - Density: 22.7/km^{2} (58.9/sq mi)
- Demonym: Montagutesi
- Time zone: UTC+1 (CET)
  - Summer (DST): UTC+2 (CEST)
- Postal code: 83030
- Dialing code: 0825
- Patron saint: St. Crescentius
- Saint day: 13 August
- Website: Official website

Montaguto (Irpino: Mundaùtë) is a town and comune in the province of Avellino, Campania, southern Italy.

Located astride the Apennines between Irpinia historical district and Daunian Mountains, the town is part of the Roman Catholic Diocese of Ariano Irpino-Lacedonia. Its territory borders the municipalities of Greci, Orsara di Puglia, Panni and Savignano Irpino.
