= Carapelle (river) =

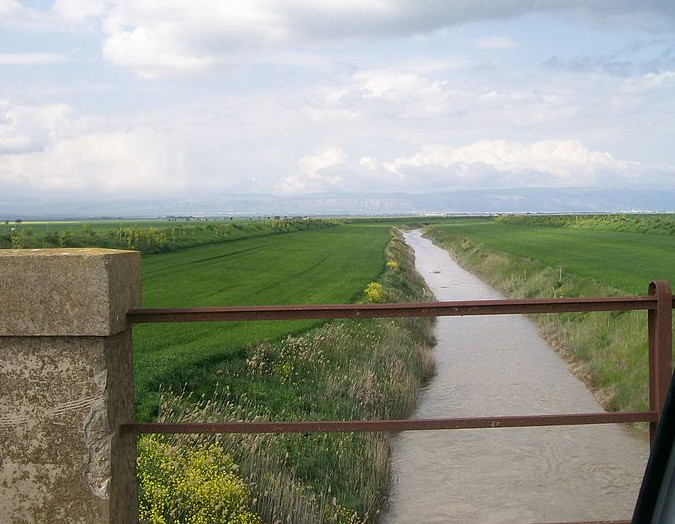

Location
- Country: Italy

Physical characteristics
- Source
  - location: north of Anzano di Puglia
  - elevation: 800 m (2,600 ft)
- Mouth: Adriatic Sea
  - location: Gulf of Manfredonia
  - coordinates: 41.4929°N 15.9258°E
- Length: 98 km (61 mi)
- Basin size: 950 km^{2} (370 sq mi)
- Discharge
  - average: 2.10 m^{3}/s (74 cu ft/s)

The Carapelle is a river in the province of Foggia in the Apulia region of Italy. The source of the river is north of Anzano di Puglia near the border with the province of Avellino in the Daunian Mountains, along the Campanian Apennine. The river flows northeast near Monteleone di Puglia before curving eastward and flowing near Accadia and Sant'Agata di Puglia before being joined by a right tributary, the Calaggio. The river then curves northeast and is joined by a left tributary, the Carapellotto, before flowing past Ordona and Carapelle. The river connects with the Saline di Margherita di Savoia salt marsh via two branches on the south bank of the river before emptying into the Gulf of Manfredonia in the Adriatic Sea northwest of Zapponeta.
