= Faeto =

Faeto Fayéte (Arpitan)
- Comune
- Comune di Faeto
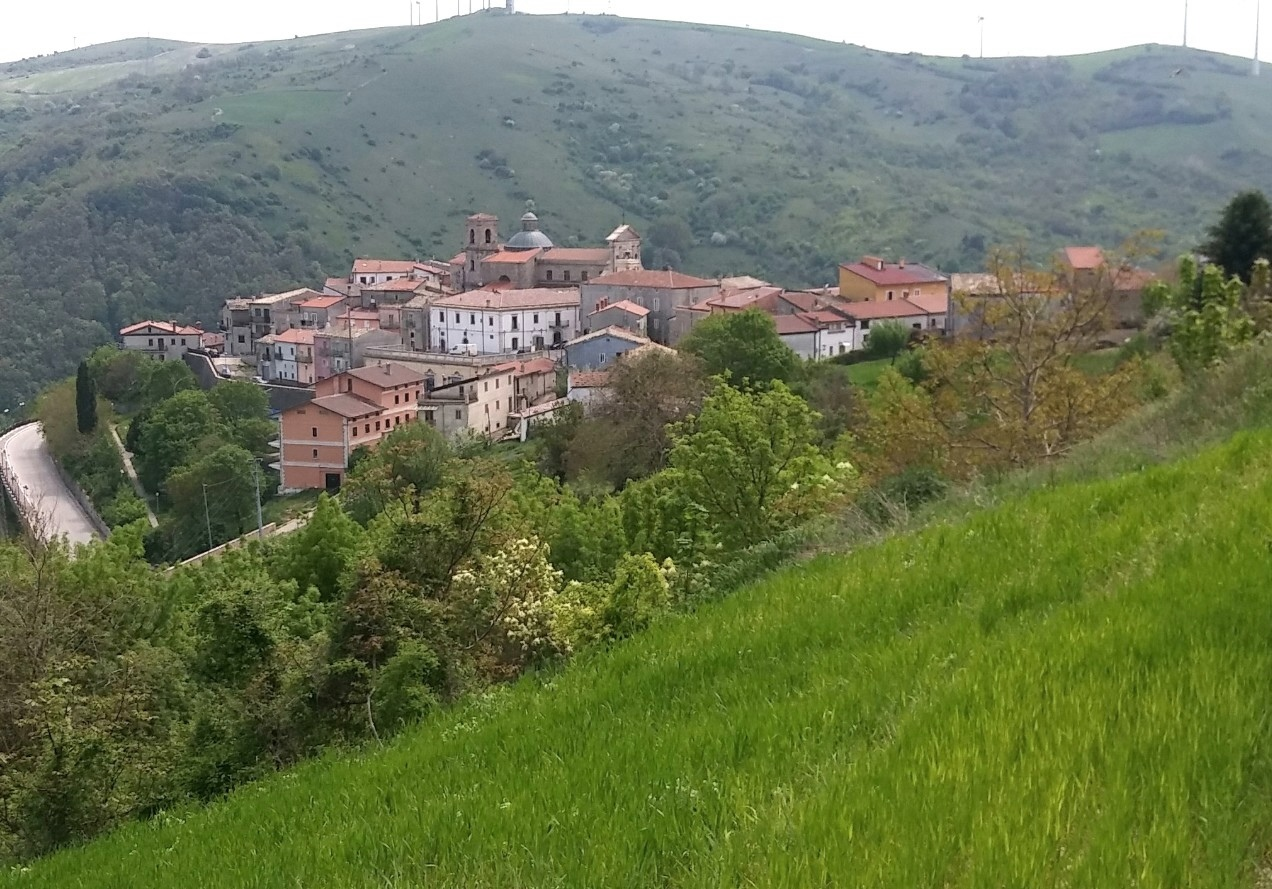
- View of Faeto

- Location within Italy Location within Apulia
- Coordinates: 41°19′30″N 15°9′39″E
- Country: Italy
- Region: Apulia
- Province: Foggia (FG)

Area
  - Total: 26.19 km^{2} (10.11 sq mi)
- Elevation: 820 m (2,690 ft)

Population (31 December 2003)
  - Total: 719
  - Density: 27.5/km^{2} (71.1/sq mi)
- Demonym: Faetani (Fadon singular)
- Time zone: UTC+1 (CET)
  - Summer (DST): UTC+2 (CEST)
- Postal code: 71020
- Dialing code: 0881
- ISTAT code: 071023
- Patron saint: San Prospero
- Saint day: Second Sunday in August
- Website: Official website

Faeto (Arpitan: Fayéte, IPA: [faˈjet]) is a town and comune in the province of Foggia in the Apulia region of southeast Italy.

It is a mountain village lying astride the Apennines and renowned for its prosciutto, an Italian dry-cured ham known as prosciutto di Faeto. Residents of Faeto and neighbouring Celle di San Vito are speakers of Faetar, a daughter language of the Franco-Provençal language, which is found in an Alpine region spanning northwestern Italy, southeastern France and southwestern Switzerland. Faeto was also historically inhabited by the Arbëreshë community, which still lives in neighboring Greci.

Faeto borders the following municipalities: Biccari, Castelfranco in Miscano, Celle di San Vito, Greci, Orsara di Puglia, Roseto Valfortore.
