= Faetar language =

Franco-Provençal language spoken in two communities in the province of Foggia, Italy

Faetar
- Faetano and Cellese Francoprovençal
- Pronunciation: [fajˈdar]
- Native to: Italy
- Region: Foggia
- Native speakers: < 1,000 (2010)
- Language family: Indo-European: Italic; Latino-Faliscan; Latin; Romance; Italo-Western; Western Romance; Gallo-Iberian?; Gallo-Romance; Gallo-Rhaetian?; Arpitan–Oïl; Arpitan; Faetar
- Early forms: Old Latin: Vulgar Latin; Proto-Romance; Old Gallo-Romance; Franco-Provençal
- Writing system: Latin (no official orthography)

Official status
- Official language in: Franco-Provençal protected by statute in Italy

Language codes
- ISO 639-3: –
- Glottolog: faet1240 Faeto and Celle San Vito Francoprovencal
- IETF: frp-u-sd-itfg

External videos
- Faedar/Cellese speech
- “Cellese - 4 Oral Histories”, May 2, 2016, Endangered Language Alliance of Toronto.

Faetar, fully known as Faetar–Cigliàje (Italian: Faetano–Cellese), is a variety of the Franco-Provençal language that is spoken in two small communities in Foggia, Italy: Faeto and Celle di San Vito, as well as émigré communities in Ontario, Canada (primarily Toronto and Brantford).

Although Faetar shares many similarities with other varieties of Franco-Provençal, as well as Italian, it is distinct from both. Because Faeto and Celle di San Vito have been isolated from the rest of Italy by the Daunian mountains, and also due to the influence of Irpinian dialects (spoken in almost all neighboring villages), Faetar has evolved and changed over the centuries into a distinct language.

After a large wave of emigration from Italy after the Second World War, many Faetano and Cellese settled in North America; with a relatively large group immigrating to Toronto and Brantford in Canada. The language has been studied both in its native Italy, and in Toronto, because of its small number of speakers, its unique blend of Italian and Franco-Provençal features, and its changes brought on by language contact.

Although not given a distinct language code from Franco-Provençal, it is listed by UNESCO as "definitely endangered".

== History ==
The Faetar language has its beginnings in the 13th century. A Franco-Provençal group of soldiers was sent to the district of Apulia in the Kingdom of Naples to fight the battle of Benevento of 1266. After the battle, some soldiers remained and established communities in the region. Celle di San Vito was founded as a monastery on the mountainside to avoid an outbreak of malaria down the mountain, and Faeto was founded either on 8 July 1268, or 20 October 1274 by an edict from Charles of Anjou.

In the 20th century, many people from Celle di San Vito left Italy and settled in the Greater Toronto Area and Brantford in Canada, where over 2,000 residents have ties to Celle di San Vito, and in small pockets of the United States, such as upstate New York. The Toronto area community has been studied to examine the effects of language contact, and to study the differences between the language in Toronto and in Italy.

== Language ==
There have been at least two dictionaries and one grammar published since 2000 that describe the Faetar language in Italian. It has also been studied extensively in English, French, and Italian as a minority language, a language in contact, and for comparison with other Franco-Provençal languages.

Faetar's grammar is similar to most other Romance languages with articles that agree with masculine and feminine nouns, and verbs that are inflected with different endings for person, number, and tense. Because of these inflected verbs, pronouns are not necessary. However, Faetar has a unique pronoun characteristic in that it has two versions of each pronoun. There is a "strong" pronoun and a "weak" pronoun. In conversation, both the strong and the weak can be used together (the strong always comes first), or only the strong, or only the weak, or no pronoun at all. The weak can also appear after a noun. For example:

(1) No overt subject pronoun

/ɛ lu dʒórɛ Ø stav a la kaz/

and that day, [Ø=I] was at the house

(2) Weak pronoun

/e i stávo vakánt/

and it was vacant

(3) Strong pronoun

/no íʎɛ sta tútːo/

No, he was always…

(4) Strong + Weak pronoun

/íʎɛ i e lu me prɛfɛríːtə/

She-strong she-weak is my favourite

This case of strong and weak pronouns has been the source of much study as to what constrains, if anything, the choice of pronouns in a given phrase. This also makes Faetar a partial pro-drop language.
