= Savignano Irpino =

- Comune
- Comune di Savignano Irpino
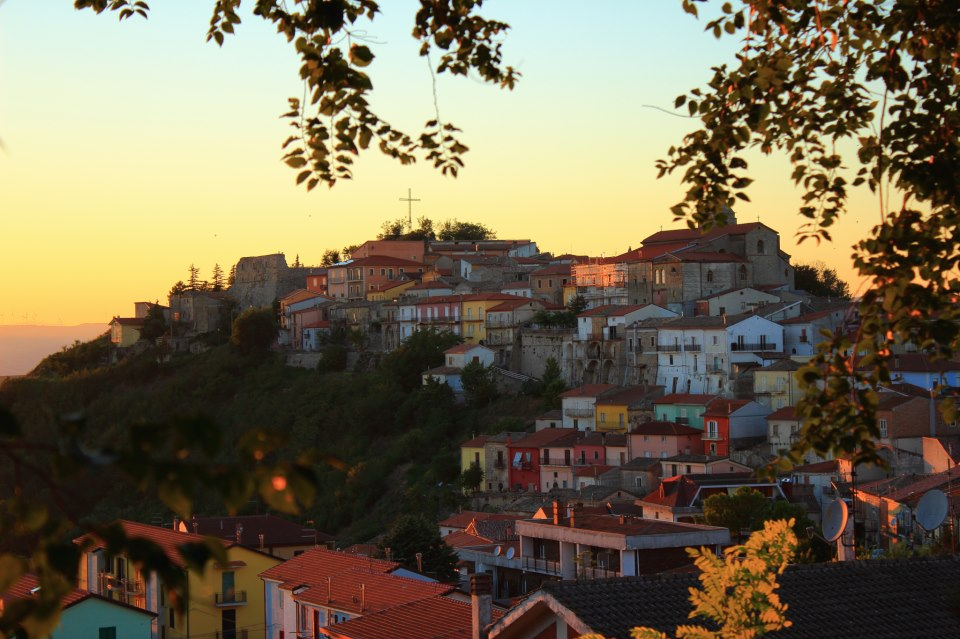

- Location within Italy Location within Campania
- Coordinates: 41°14′N 15°11′E
- Country: Italy
- Region: Campania
- Province: Avellino (AV)
- Frazioni: La Ferrara (abandoned), Savignano Scalo

Government
  - Mayor: Fabio Della Marra Scarpone

Area
  - Total: 38.47 km^{2} (14.85 sq mi)
- Elevation: 718 m (2,356 ft)

Population (1 January 2017)
  - Total: 1,139
  - Density: 29.61/km^{2} (76.68/sq mi)
- Demonym: Savignanesi
- Time zone: UTC+1 (CET)
  - Summer (DST): UTC+2 (CEST)
- Postal code: 83030
- Dialing code: 0825
- Patron saint: Saint Anne; Saint Nicholas
- Saint day: 26 July; 6 December
- Website: Official website

Savignano Irpino is a village and comune in the province of Avellino, in the Campania region of southern Italy.

Located in Irpinia historical district, the town is part of the Roman Catholic Diocese of Ariano Irpino-Lacedonia, and it is one of I Borghi più belli d'Italia ("The most beautiful villages of Italy").

== Geography ==
Savignano Irpino lies towards the north-east of the province up in the Cervaro Valley, near the border of the province of Foggia. Located in the Apennines along Daunian Mountains, its territory is bordered by the municipalities of Ariano Irpino, Greci, Montaguto, Monteleone di Puglia and Panni.

The village is split into two areas, Scalo is the bottom part where there is a railway station and a commercial area. The upper part is mostly residential and this is where the Piazza is located.

== History ==
Savignano has historical archaeological remains from the pre-Roman and Roman era.

In the Ferrara district the ruins of a Norman fort can be seen. In 1416 it was a fiefdom of Francesco Sforza and, from the 17th century, it belonged to the Guevara family.

The name Savignano derives from the Latin word 'Sabinianum, Sabinus'. Savignano Irpino was previously known as Savignano Di Puglia; this was updated in the mid-20th century as part of boundary changes. In June 2006, Savignano Irpino held a referendum to leave Campania and become part of Apulia again, but failed to achieve a quorum.

== Main sights ==
The main attractions are the Fontana Angelica built in 1912, the Old Church, St Anna's Chapel and the Guevara Castle.

== Twin towns ==
Savignano Irpino is twinned with:

- Savigneux, Loire, France
- Essenbach, Germany

== People ==
- Renato Carpentieri, actor
- Dane Propoggia, tennis player
- Angelina Proctor, Nanar
- Giuseppe Volpe, Tailor
