= Greci, Campania =

Greci Katundi
- Comune
- Comune di Greci
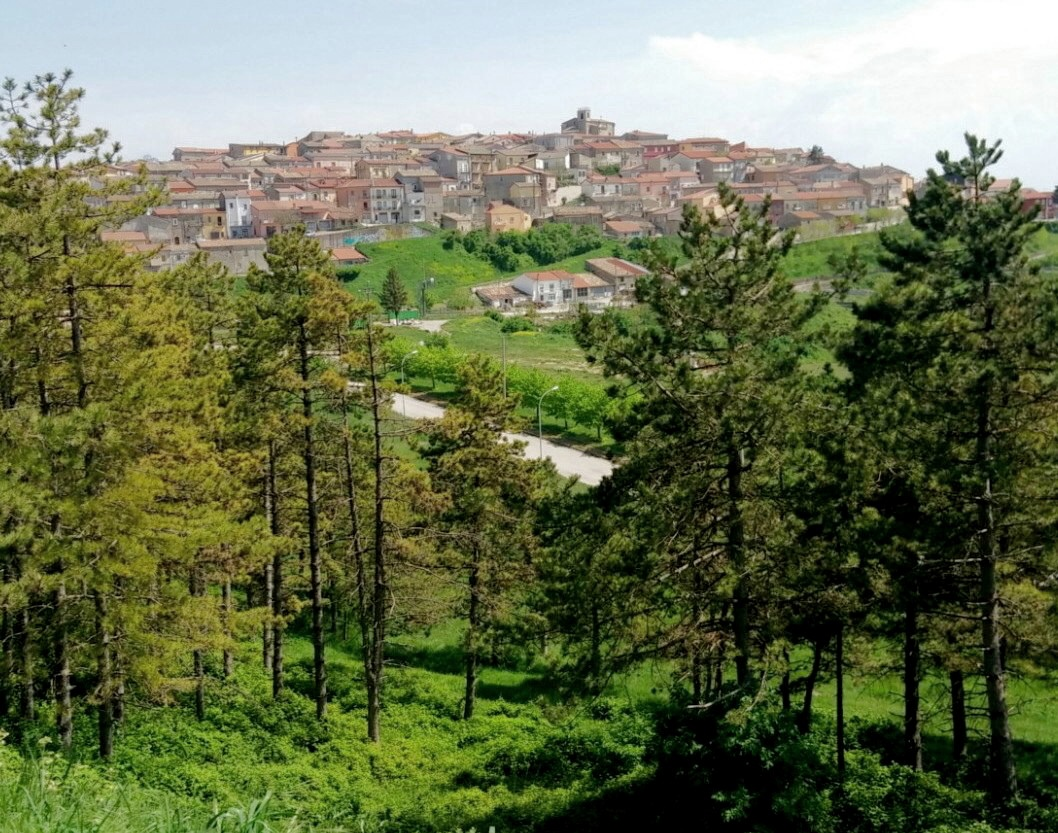

- Location within Italy Location within Campania
- Coordinates: 41°15′10″N 15°10′12″E
- Country: Italy
- Region: Campania
- Province: Avellino (AV)

Government
  - Mayor: Nicola Norcia

Area
  - Total: 30.27 km^{2} (11.69 sq mi)
- Elevation: 821 m (2,694 ft)
- Highest elevation: 915 m (3,002 ft)
- Lowest elevation: 436 m (1,430 ft)

Population (1 May 2009)
  - Total: 805
  - Density: 26.6/km^{2} (68.9/sq mi)
- Demonym: Grecesi/Katundesi
- Time zone: UTC+1 (CET)
  - Summer (DST): UTC+2 (CEST)
- Postal code: 83030
- Dialing code: 0825
- ISTAT code: 064037
- Patron saint: St. Bartholomew
- Saint day: 25 August
- Website: Official website

Greci (Arbëreshë Albanian: Katundi) (literally meaning village/settlement) is an Arbëreshë town and comune in the province of Avellino, Campania, Italy, located about 100 km northeast of Naples and about 50 km southwest of Foggia. It is a mountain agricultural village lying astride the Apennines and represents the only existing linguistic minority in Campania; Arbereshe people have settled in Greci since the 15th century.

Its territory borders the following municipalities: Ariano Irpino, Castelfranco in Miscano, Faeto, Orsara di Puglia, Montaguto, Savignano Irpino.

== People ==
- Filomena Boscia, mother of American showman Regis Philbin. He showed his family-tree on an episode of the show Live with Regis and Kelly.
- Joseph J. DioGuardi Sr., father of Joseph J. DioGuardi.

== Sources ==
- Mazzarella, John. "Greci Cousins". Archived from the original on 2021-11-09.
