= Mount Saraceno =

Mountain in Italy

Mount Saraceno is a mountain on the Adriatic Sea within the territory of Mattinata in Apulia, Italy. It is an important site with a necropolis of at least 400 graves dug in the rock by Daunians in the 9th century BC.

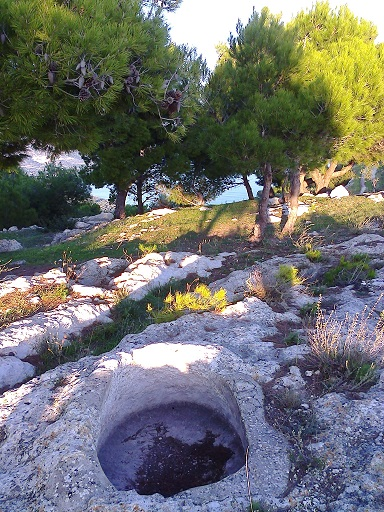
Graves of civilization of Dauni, Monte Saraceno.

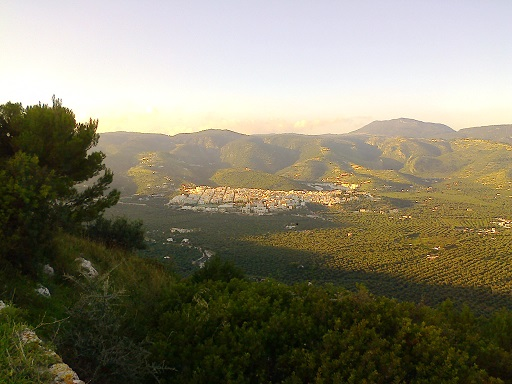
Mattinata, Panorama.
