= Saline di Margherita di Savoia =

Salt marsh in Foggia province, Italy

Coordinates: 41°23′21″N 16°03′48″E

Designations

Ramsar Wetland
- Designated: 2 August 1979
- Reference no.: 191

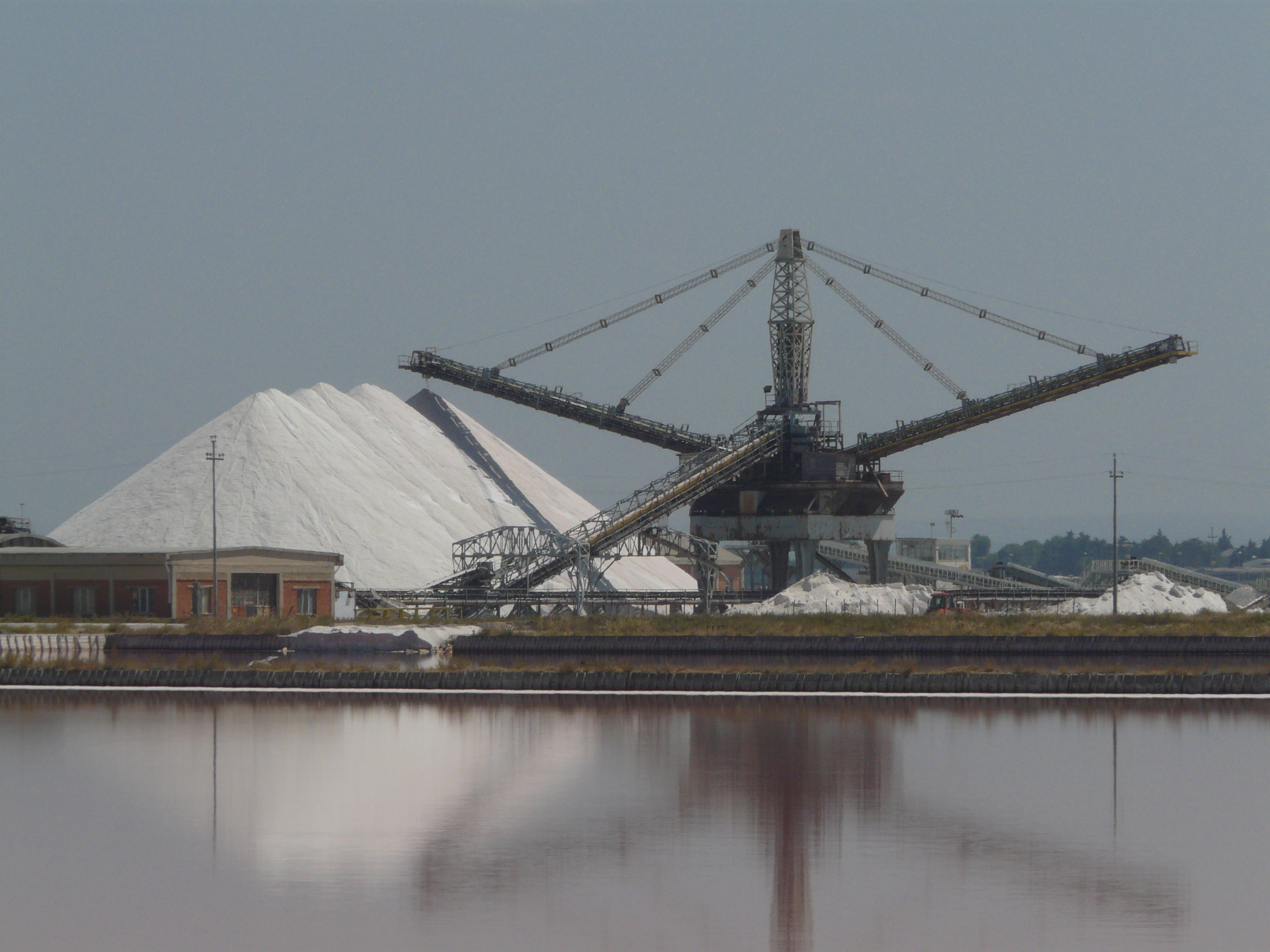
Saline di Margherita di Savoia

Saline di Margherita di Savoia is a salt marsh in the Province of Barletta-Andria-Trani in Apulia, Italy. The marsh is on the coast of Italy bordering the Gulf of Manfredonia in the Adriatic Sea. The marsh consists of several canals running longitudinally and transversely relative to the coast. Two channels connect the marsh to the Carapelle River. Trinitapoli is south of the marsh, Zapponeta is further north along the coast from the marsh and Margherita di Savoia is further south along the coast from the marsh.

== History ==
In ancient times, this area was a coastal lagoon known as Lake Salpi. The Daunians built a city there known as Salapia, probably because of the salt incrustations present at the site. This area has been fought over ever since because of the salt. In the twentieth century, the entire area was converted into saltworks. The theoretical study of Italian saltworks reached its peak at this site over this period. However, in the 1980s, a new method known as long-term production was implemented. This method uses the "big beam" harvest method and has advantages over the older method.

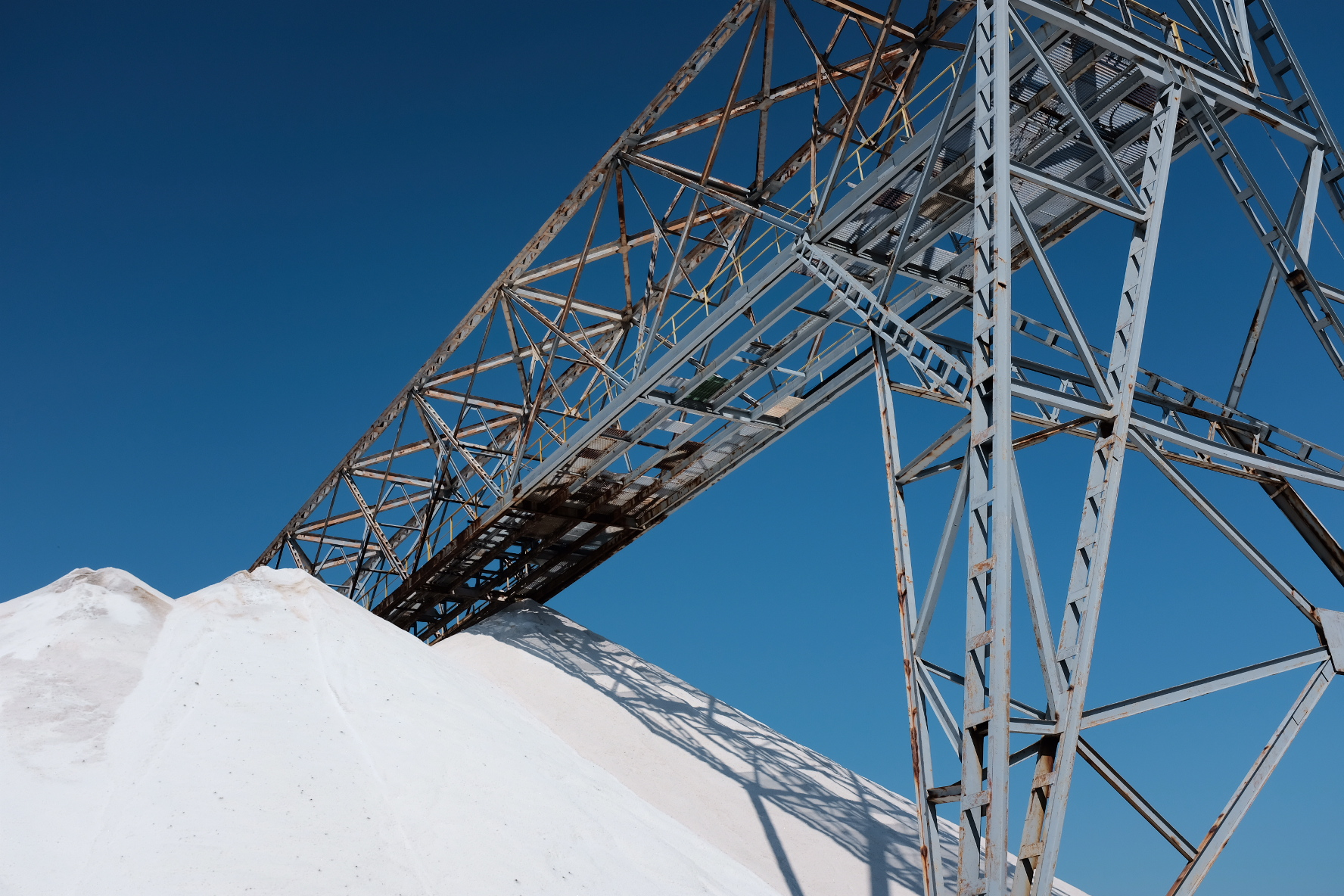

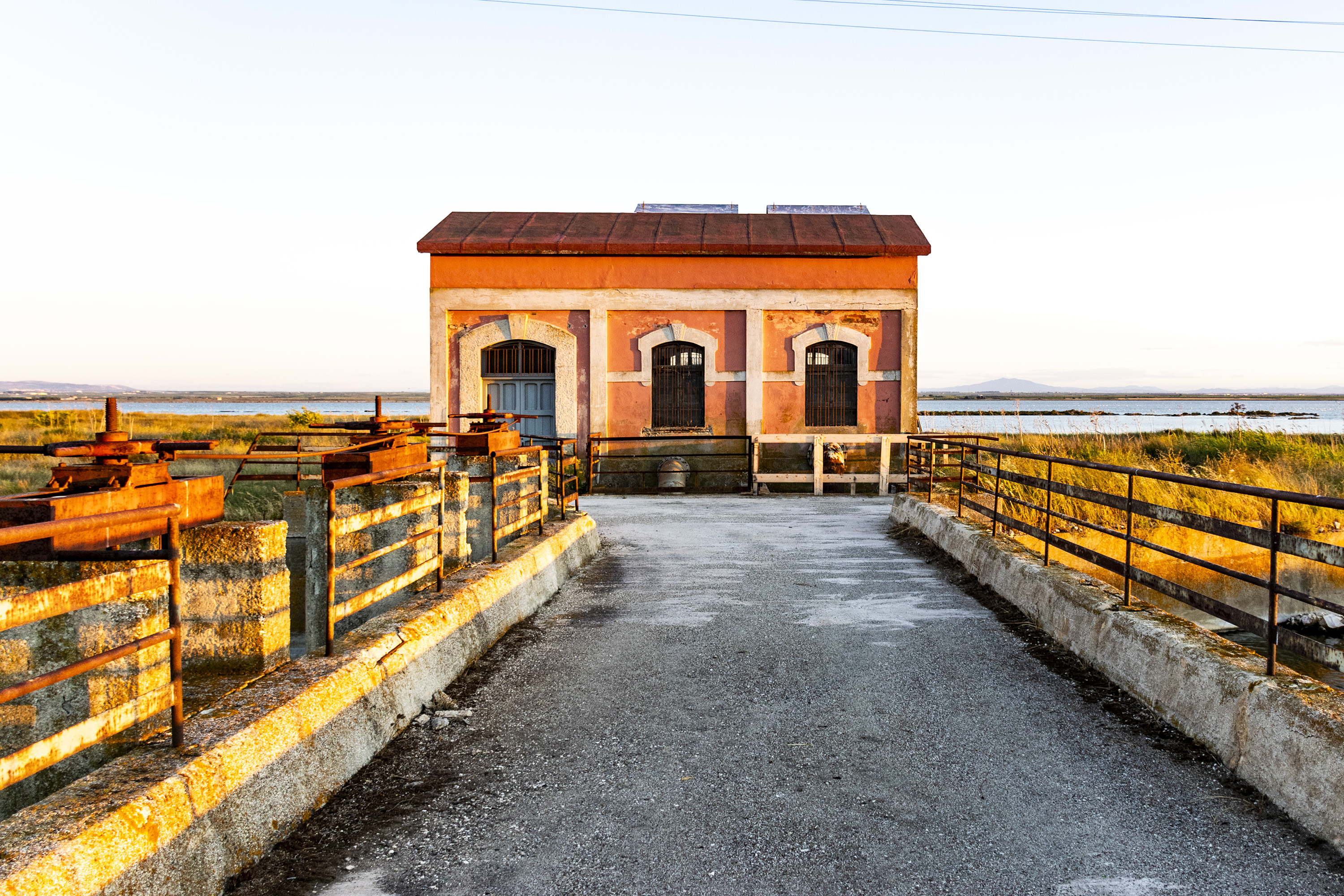

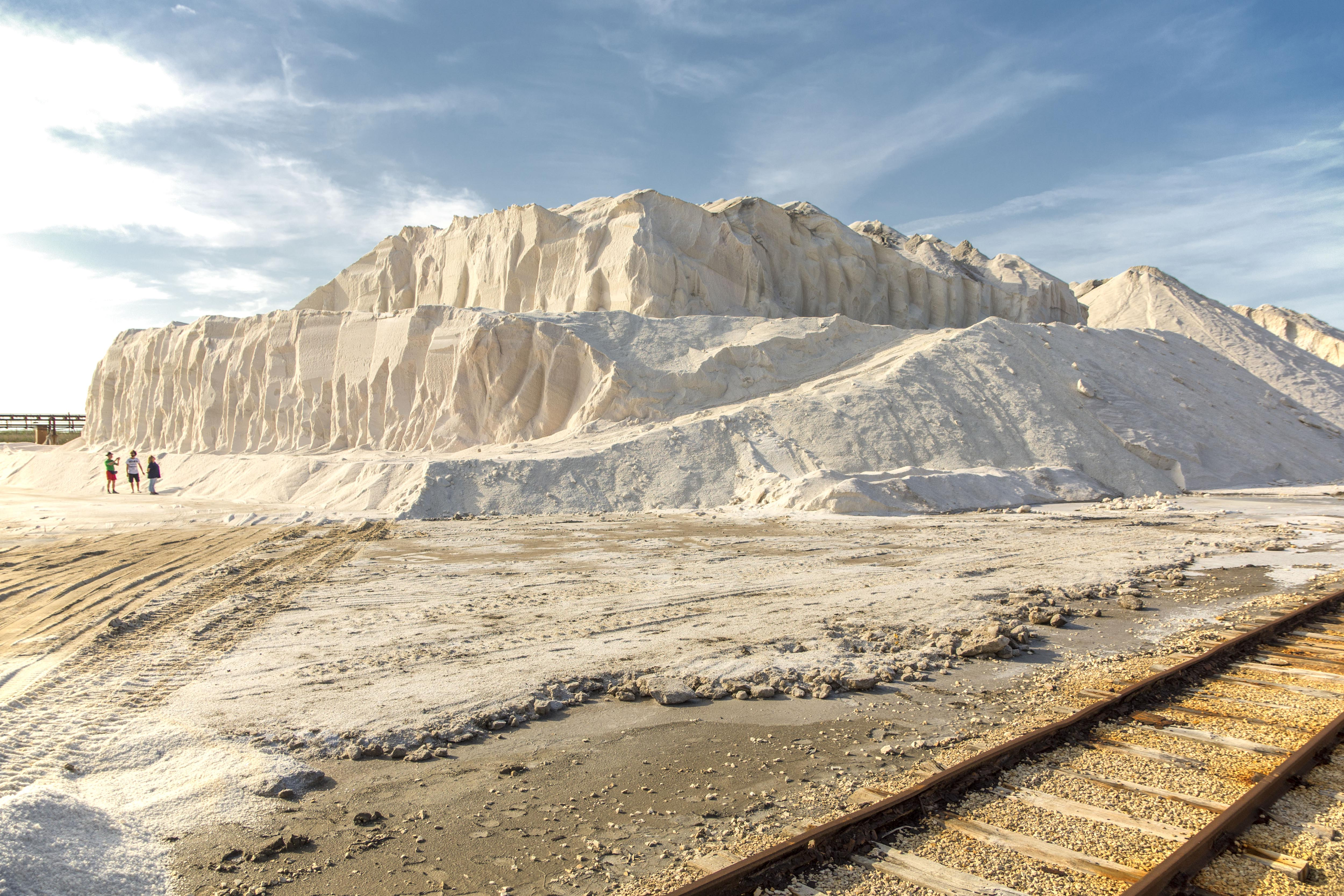

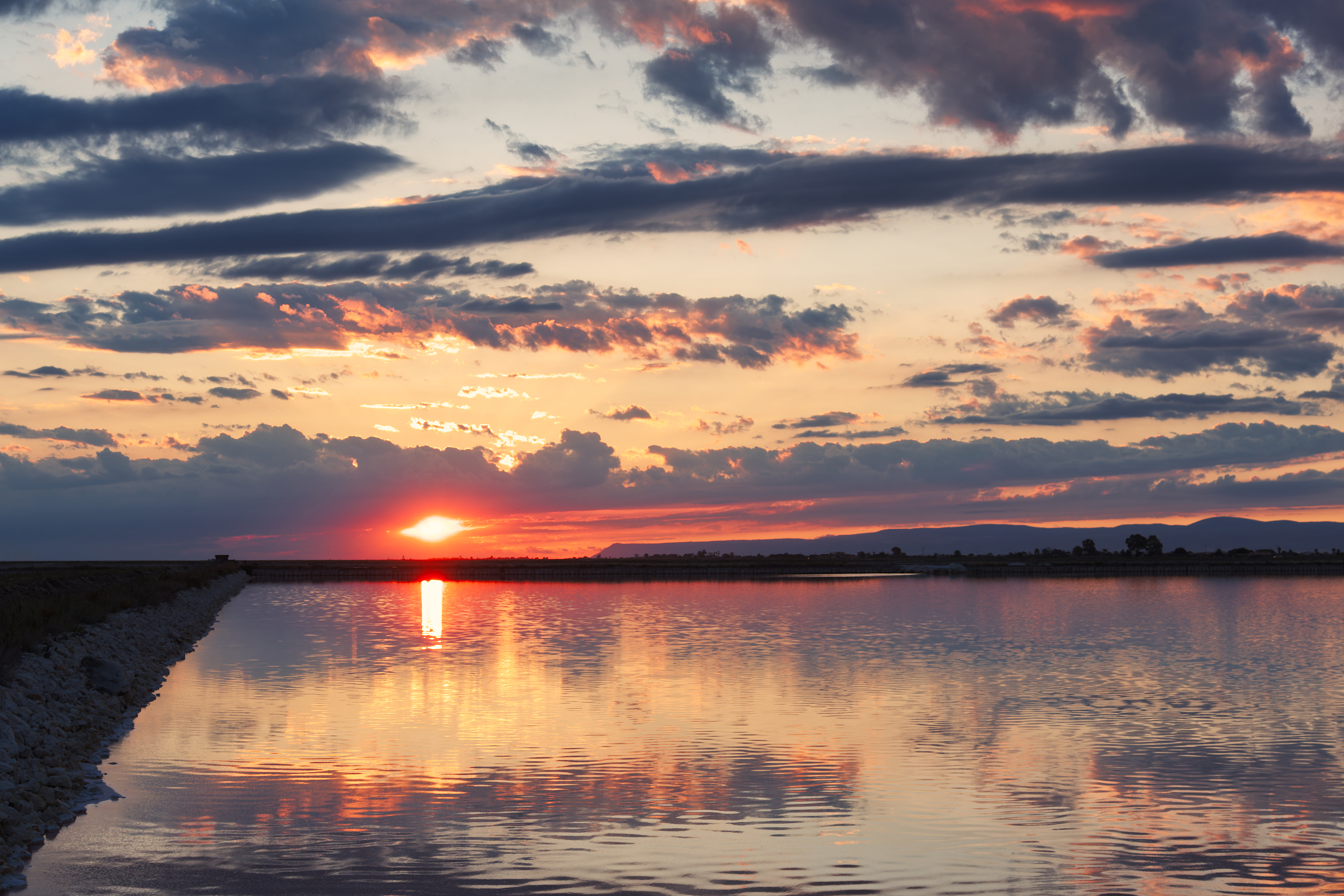

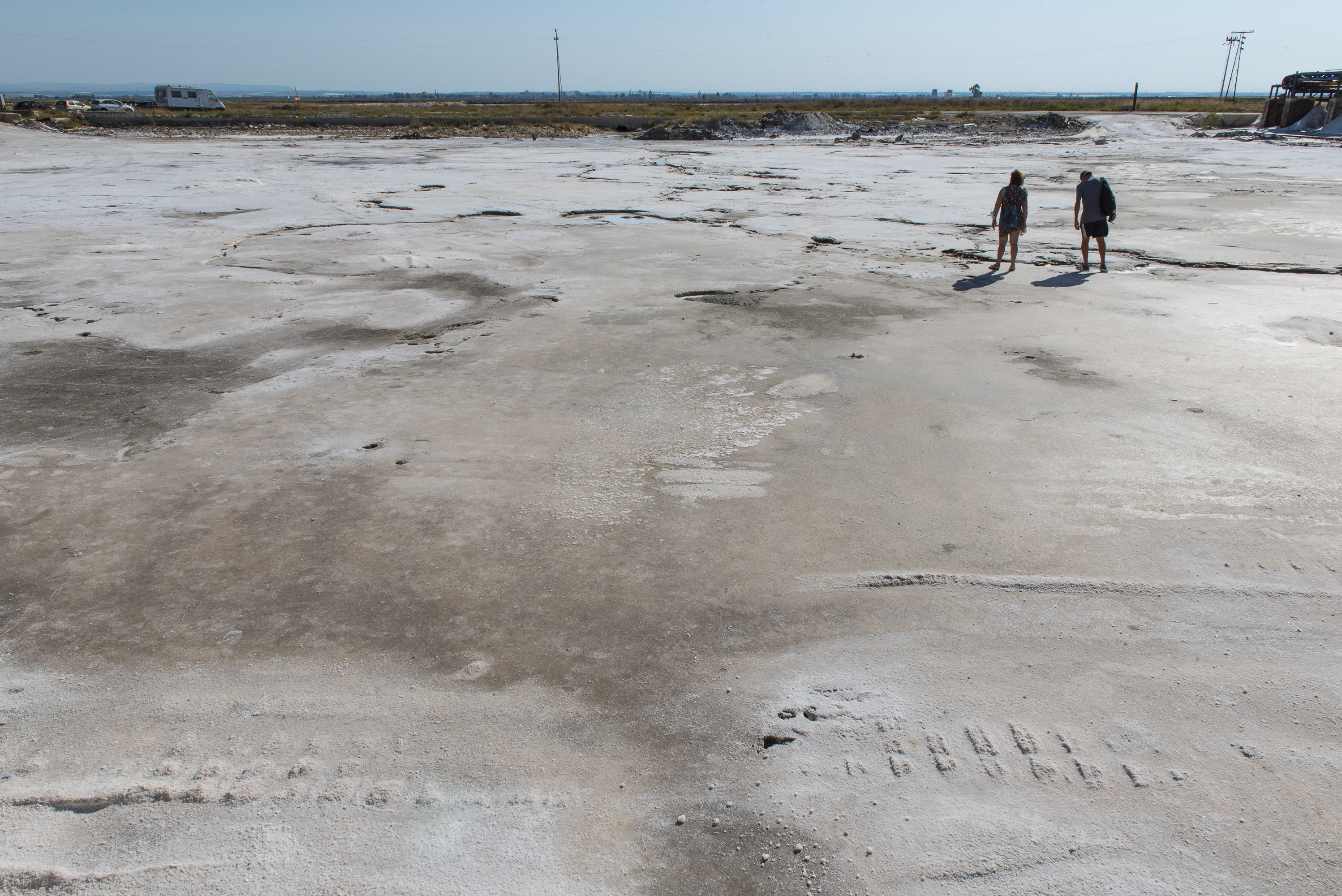

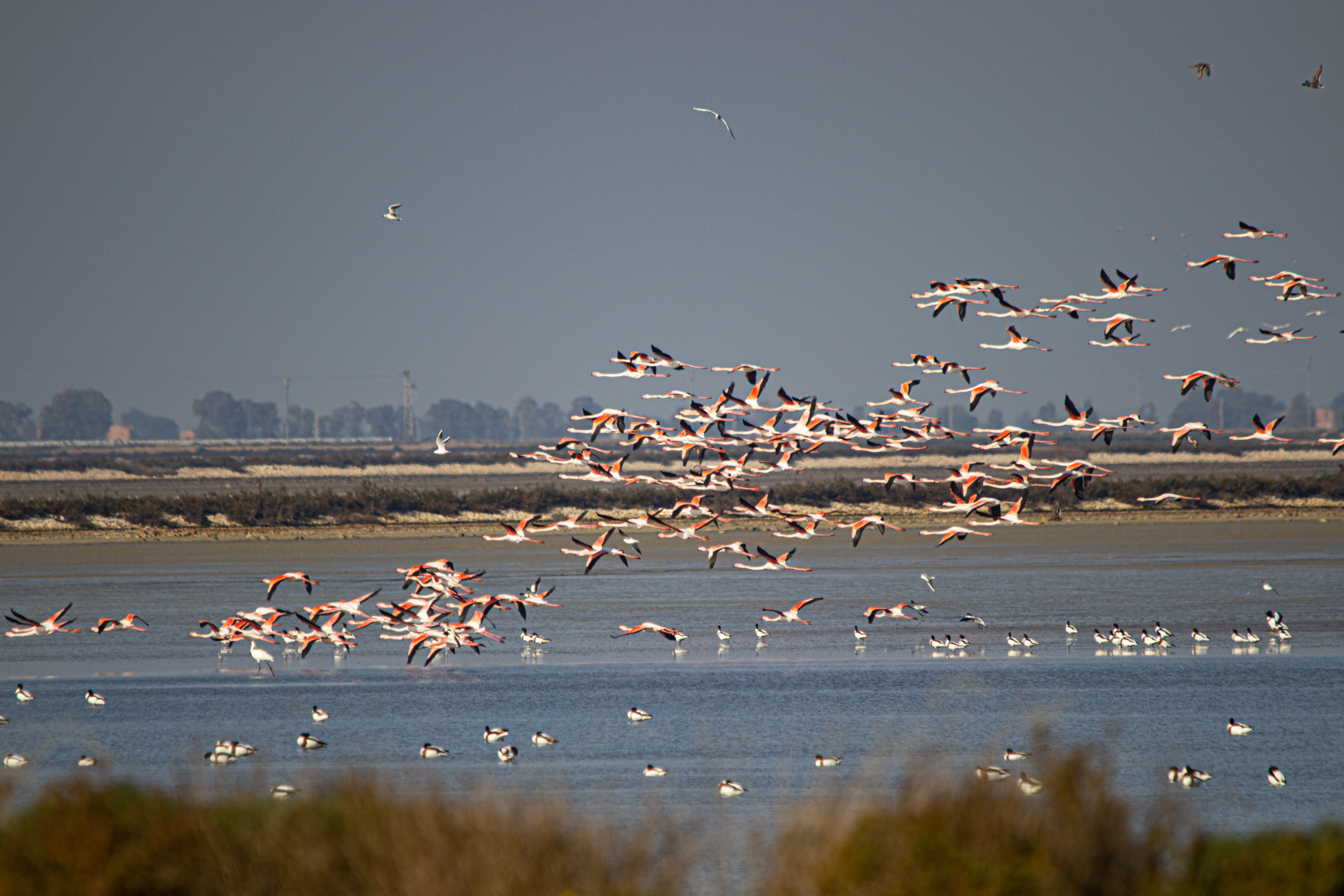

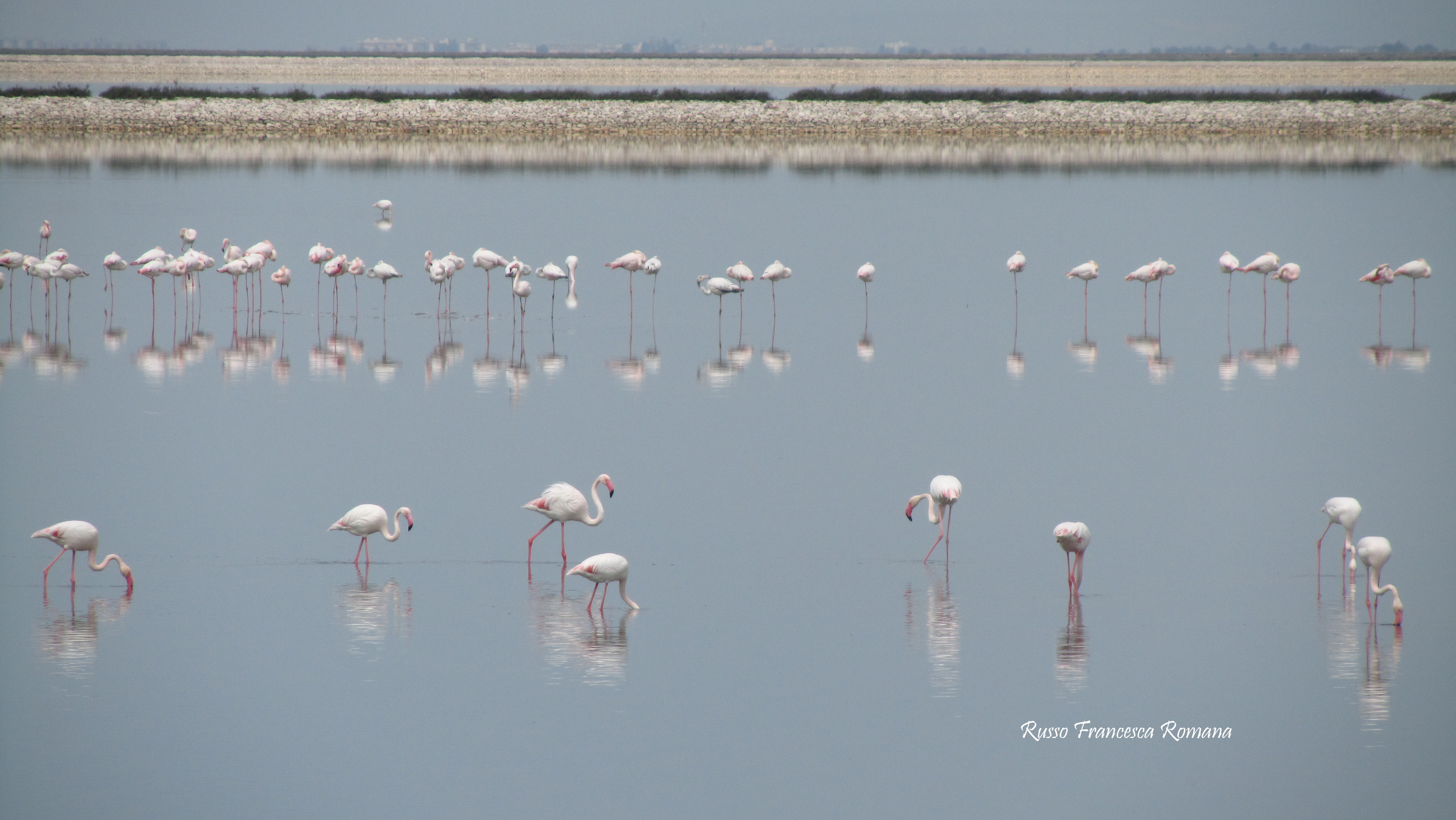
