= Calaggio =

Coordinates: 41°16′N 15°35′E

Location
- Country: Italy

Physical characteristics
- Source
  - location: north of Vallata
- Mouth: Carapelle

Basin features
- Progression: Carapelle→ Adriatic Sea

The Calaggio is a river in the province of Avellino in Campania and the province of Foggia in Apulia. The source of the river is north of Vallata in the province of Avellino in the Appennino Napoletano Mountains. It flows northeast and forms the border between the province of Avellino and the province of Foggia for a short distance before flowing into the province of Foggia. It flows through the comuni of Trevico and Candela. At its confluence with the Gennaro, the river Carapelle is formed.
