= Carapellotto =

Location
- Country: Italy

Physical characteristics
- Source
  - location: near Deliceto
  - elevation: 891 m (2,923 ft)
- Mouth: Carapelle
  - coordinates: 41.2604°N 15.5655°E
- Length: 24 km (15 mi)

Basin features
- Progression: Carapelle→ Adriatic Sea

The Carapellotto is a river in the province of Foggia in the Apulia region of Italy. The source of the river is near Deliceto. The river flows northeast and then curves eastward before joining the Carapelle southwest of Ordona as a left tributary.
