= Byzantine tower of Biccari =

Building in Biccari, Italy

- Torre bizantina di Biccari
- Province of Foggia, Apulia, Italy

Site information
- Type: Defence

Location
- Coordinates: 41°23′48″N 15°11′36″E
- Height: 23 meter

Byzantine tower of Biccari is a building located in city center of Biccari, a city in Province of Foggia in Italy.
