= Daunian stele =

Stone funerary monument constructed by Daunians

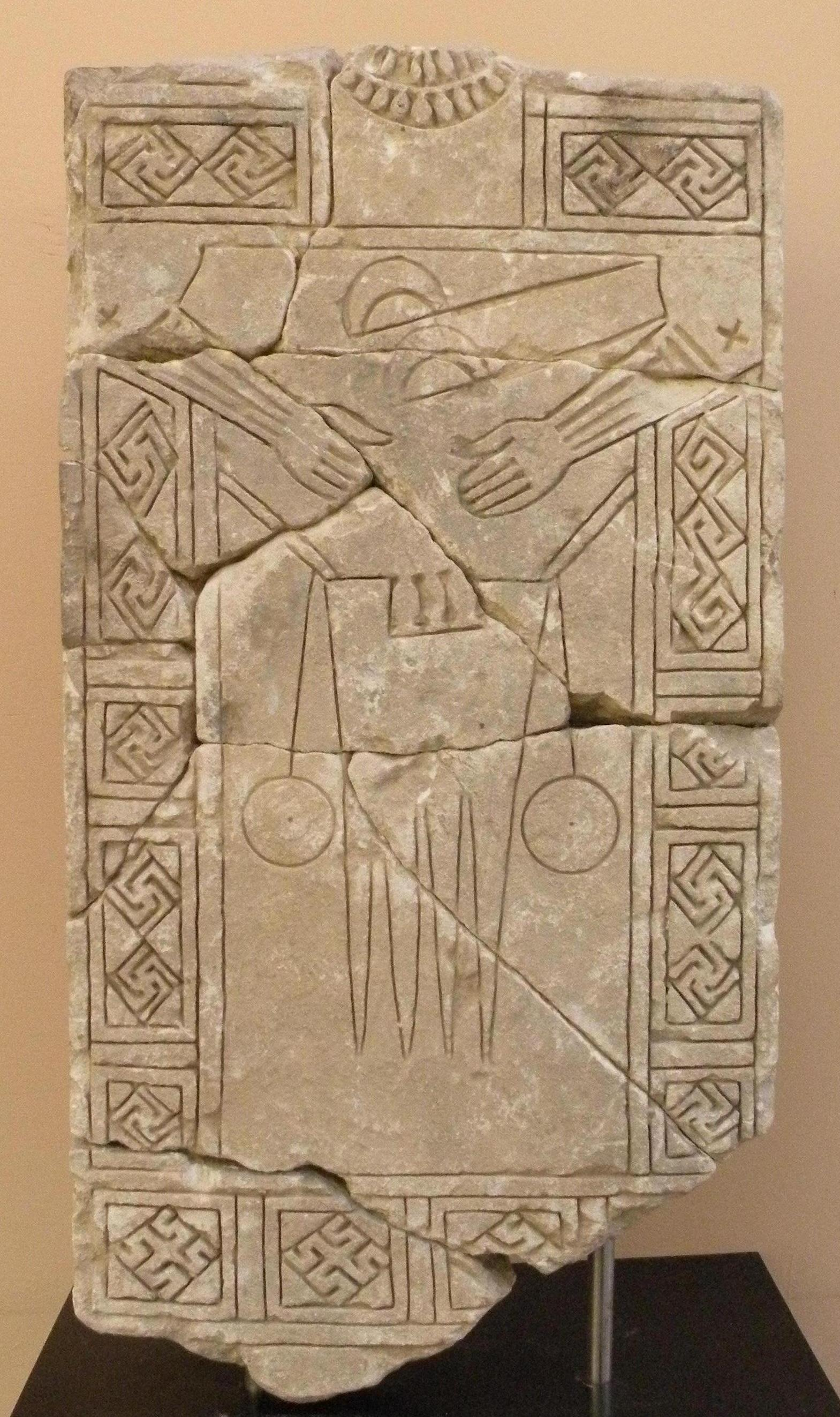
Daunian stele, limestone grave marker (?), 610-550 BC

A Daunian stele is a type of stone funerary monument constructed by the Daunians, an Iapygian tribe which inhabited Apulia in classical antiquity. Daunian stelae were made from the end of the 8th century BC to the 6th century BC. They consist of a parallelepiped-shaped plate with a protrusion on the upper side and decoration on all four sides. Sizes vary between 40 and 130 cm in height, and consequently, between 20 and 80 cm in width while the thickness is between 3 and 12 cm.

== Description ==
Daunian stelae were made from limestone in the southern part of Gargano where 2000 copies were found. Originally they were placed vertically on top of the mound covering the tomb, with a base devoid decoration that was stuck in the ground. Their decorations were executed with more or less deep incisions, a schematic representation of the deceased in their full dress funeral (decoration primary) accompanied by ornaments and abstract figurative scenes that form filler (secondary decoration).

The stars are divided into two categories depending on the presence of weapons in the depiction of the deceased, or ornaments. The first category would cover warriors, belonging to approximately 14% of the stelae found, while the second group, which includes all others, also includes the many stars which refer to female characters, approximately 6% of total stele found, which have a characteristic style with long braid on the back, also in depictions on pottery.

Figures with the ornaments as covering the whole body except the arms folded on the chest and covered with embroidered cotton gloves, and head covered with a tall conical hat that stretches to cover the neck. Among the deceased ornaments are necklaces to more speed, large brooches and pendants long bracket composite chest, belt or pendant circular form of pomegranate and tapes, and pairs of large pendants in the center, and fermatrecce with three points for the circular female figures. Warriors have a chest cardiophylax (plate protection for the upper chest) rectangular with concave sides, which is hung a sword "cross", kept in its scabbard and placed transversely to the hilt to the right, the spadapendono below the tape. The arms are always close to the chest, but with no ornaments. On the back, hangs a large shield round hoplite type, with "episema" (central theme) geometric (radial and vortex of the most common reasons) or, more rarely figured. The heads are in this case obtained in a separate block and insert the neck through a hole, have a circular shape and had to be covered by a helmet or other headgear. The figurative scenes are rendered with subtle engravings and characters are both human and animals and legendary creatures, and gods theriomorphic (depicted with animal features). They are engraved with scenes of funerals, with processions of bearers of offerings with containers on their heads, accompanied by a lyre player, but there are also representations of daily activities: fishing, sailing ships from sailing with square or, more rarely different types of hunting, both on horseback with the lance (deer hunting) and walk with the sling (birds). The stele of warriors often have processions of chariots or fight scenes, which were interpreted as funeral games in honor of the deceased, or hunting scenes and battles, which sometimes appear warrior with a helmet or mask in the form of bucranium three horns. Often there appear also fantastic animals (pegasi, chimeras and sea serpents, among others).

== See also ==
- Illyrians

== Bibliography ==
- Gentile, Raffaele (2023). I maestri delle stele Daunie: ricerche di archeologia sperimentale. Roma Bristol (CT): "L'Erma" di Bretschneider. ISBN 9788891330550.
- Serricchio, Cristanziano. "Le Stele Daunie e la tradizione antiomerica della Guerra di Troia" (PDF). La Capitanata (in Italian) (19 - March 2006). Biblioteca Provinciale di Foggia: 183–7.
