= Salapia =

Ancient city in Daunia, Italy

Salapia Salapia vetus
- City
- Interactive map of Salapia
- Country: Magna Grecia, Samnites, Ancient Rome, Lombards, Normans
- Established: 10th century BCE

Salapia (also called Salpe and Salpi) is an ancient settlement and bishopric in Daunia, Italy near Cerignola and Manfredonia. The settlement was probably built for and named after the salt marsh - the ancient Lake Salpi is now Saline di Margherita di Savoia. Salapia is mentioned by Pliny the Elder, Ptolemy and probably the "Elpia" of Strabo, but according to Smith (1857) in relation to the later town, and not an earlier original settlement.

== Topography ==
The first attestation of Salapia dates back to the 4th century BC with the toponym Salapia vetus, mentioned by Vitruvius, known among scholars as "pre-Roman Salapia". However, its foundation is certainly much earlier and is rooted in the myth of Diomedes, colonizer of the Adriatic, from which derives the toponym Elpia, cited by Strabo with reference to a location founded by Rhodians.

In the 1st century BC, it was refounded by Marcus Hostilius in the locality of Monte di Salpi. When the lagoon on which the city was situated became marshy, the inhabitants of Salapia requested and obtained permission to relocate about four miles away to a healthier area: thus the Roman Salapia came into being, whose name gradually evolved into Salpia and then Salpi.

Under this latter name, it is also recorded as an episcopal see from 314 to 1547, at which point the Diocese of Salpi was suppressed and its territory united with the Archdiocese of Trani.

== Archaeological site ==
The archaeological site relating to the ancient city of Salapia is located in the southern part of the Tavoliere delle Puglie, a few kilometers northwest of Margherita di Savoia. It corresponds to Salapia vetus, mentioned in various literary sources, whose location, initially uncertain, was eventually identified in the locality of contrada Torretta dei Monaci through aerial photography and excavations carried out starting in 1967.

== History ==
It has been hypothesized that the origins of the city date back to the end of the 10th century BC, within the context of the supposed migrations of Illyrian peoples from the Dalmatian coast to the Apulian coast. Based on evidence from archaeological investigations conducted in the 1970s, it was proposed—though this hypothesis is now largely superseded—that colonists from the Liburnian city of Nin transferred to the Apulian coast, where they found a similar lagoon environment to that from which they originated.

The city extended across three "peninsulas" projecting into the lagoon, and within an area of approximately 9 km² there were settlements, a necropolis, and spaces designated for pasture and cultivation, which were useful in times of war. The main inhabited nucleus was located on the largest peninsula and was defended from the hinterland by a bastion and a moat. Originally, Salapia was a fraction or colony of Canusium, the modern Canosa di Puglia.

Salapia, like other centers of Daunia, was organized as a city-state, in which power was held by a restricted oligarchy. Evidence of this political autonomy is provided by the minting of its own coinage, which frequently bore the names of the rulers of the time.

During the Second Punic War, Salapia was divided between two factions: a pro-Roman group led by Blattius and a pro-Carthaginian group headed by Dasius. The latter initially prevailed, to the extent that Hannibal resided for a long time in Salapia; there he had a relationship with a local woman, whom Pliny described as a prostitute, referring to the city as Oppidum Annibalis meretricio amore inclutum. Subsequently, Salapia decided to switch to the Roman side, expelling the Carthaginian garrison and returning to alliance with Rome in 210 BC. Hannibal attempted to enter the city through a stratagem in order to take revenge, but he was unsuccessful.

Later, Salapia was involved in the Social War, during which it was besieged by the praetor Gaius Cosconius, set on fire, and almost completely razed.

By the middle of the 1st century BC, the city was in full decline, due not only to the consequences of warfare and economic difficulties, but also to changing environmental conditions. The lagoon upon which the city was situated began to silt up with debris carried by various watercourses and transformed into a marsh that generated malaria. The inhabitants of Salapia, through the mediation of a certain M. Hostilius—probably a patron of the city—obtained permission from the Roman Senate to relocate approximately four miles away, to the southeast, onto a small hill known today as "il Monte", adjacent to the salt pans. The new city was enclosed by walls and provided with a port on the sea via a canal, the structures of which were presumably located in the area of the present-day Torre di Pietra.

Thus the Roman Salapia came into being, the name of which gradually evolved into Salpia and then Salpi.

The economic prosperity achieved by the new city led to its establishment as an episcopal see in the 4th century: in 314, in fact, Pardo, Bishop of Salpi, together with the deacon Crescentius, participated in the Council of Arles. Pardo is, based on current research, the first historically attested bishop of Apulia. Other bishops are recorded in the 5th century, but in the Early Middle Ages the city did not escape the crisis that affected the entire Western world, reducing the civitas to a castrum, which was subsequently occupied by the Lombards.

From around the year 1000, Salpi experienced a continuous recovery. First under Norman lordship and later as a favored residence of Frederick II of Hohenstaufen, it enjoyed a period of particular prosperity between the 11th and 13th centuries, during which the Universitas hominum civitatis Salparum was established.

However, the late Middle Ages saw a decline of the city, which was definitively ended by the suppression of its episcopal see in 1547.

== Bibliography ==
- De Venuto, Giovanni; Goffredo, Roberto; Totten, Darian Marie (2022). Salapia-Salpi 1. Scavi e ricerche 2013-2016 [Salapia-Salpi 1. Excavations and research 2013-2016] (in Italian). Bari: Edipuglia.
- De Venuto, Giovanni; Goffredo, Roberto; Totten, Darian Marie; Ciminale, Marcello; De Mitri, Carlo (2015). "Salapia: storia e archeologia di una città tra mare e laguna" [Salapia: history and archaeology of a city between sea and lagoon]. Mélanges de l'École française de Rome: Antiquité (in Italian). 127 (1).
