= Mattinata =

Mattinata Matenéte (Neapolitan)
- Comune
- Comune di Mattinata
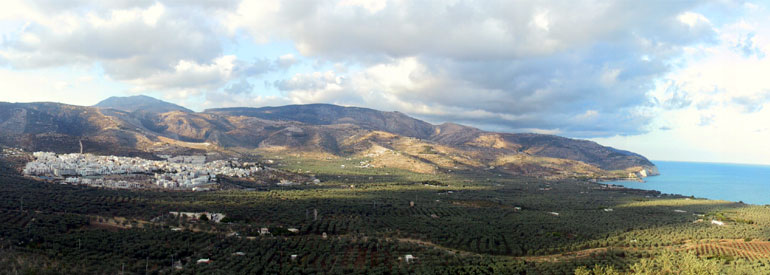
- View of Mattinata

- Coat of arms

- Location within Italy Location within Apulia
- Coordinates: 41°42′N 16°03′E
- Country: Italy
- Region: Apulia
- Province: Foggia (FG)

Government
  - Mayor: Michele Bisceglia (since 22/09/2020) (Noi Comunità)

Area
  - Total: 73.48 km^{2} (28.37 sq mi)
- Elevation: 80 m (260 ft)

Population (30 September 2025)
  - Total: 5,854
  - Density: 79.67/km^{2} (206.3/sq mi)
- Demonym: Mattinatesi
- Time zone: UTC+1 (CET)
  - Summer (DST): UTC+2 (CEST)
- Postal code: 71030
- Dialing code: 0884
- Patron saint: Our Lady of Light
- Saint day: September 15
- Website: Official website

Mattinata (Foggiano: Matenéte) is a seaside resort town and comune (municipality) in the province of Foggia, Apulia, southern Italy.

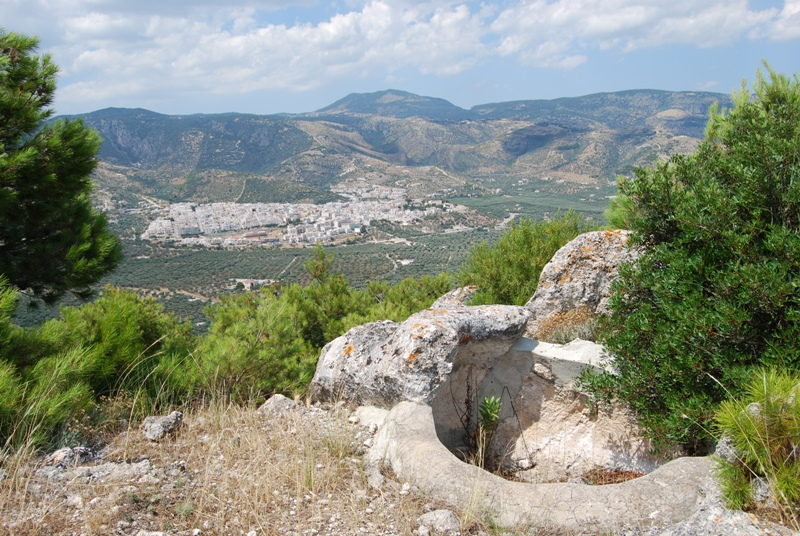
Daunian tombs near Mattinata.

== Geography ==
Mattinata is part of the Gargano National Park (Parco Nazionale del Gargano). The main urban area is located up on two hills enclosed by mountains in the northern, western and southern sides. The town faces eastward a plain (Piana di Mattinata) facing the Adriatic sea.
