= Gulf of Manfredonia =

Gulf on the east coast of Italy

Coordinates: 41°38′N 15°55′E

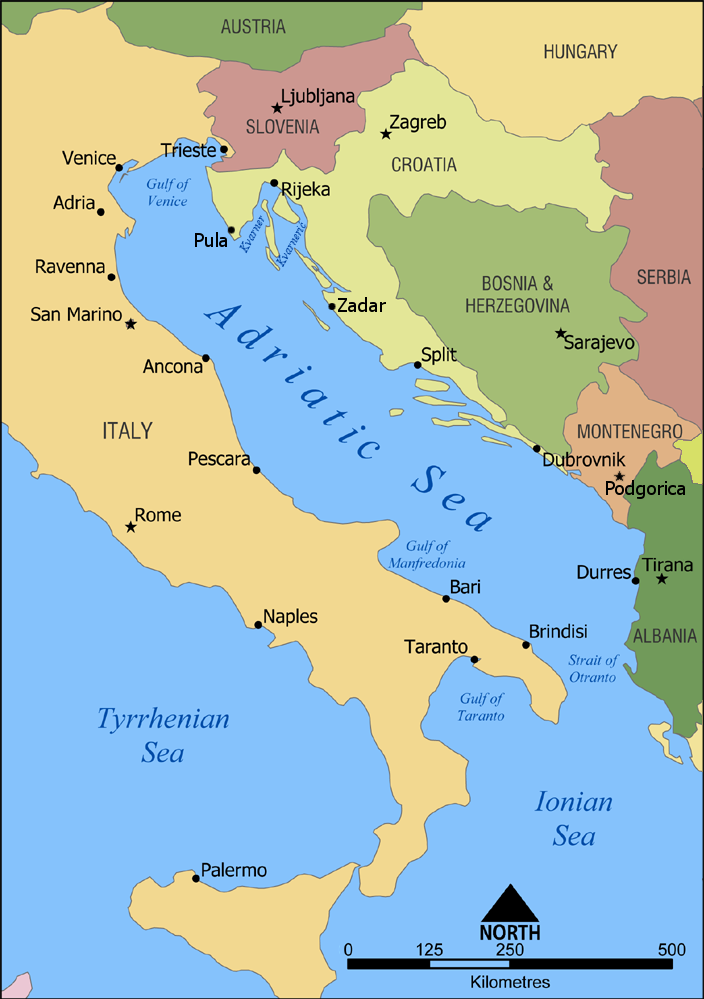
The Gulf of Manfredonia is part of the Adriatic Sea.

The Gulf of Manfredonia (Italian: Golfo di Manfredonia) is a gulf on the east coast of Italy. It is part of the Adriatic Sea. The Monte Gargano peninsula forms the northern border of the gulf, and the Apulian coast forms the southern border. Several rivers flow into the gulf, including the Carapelle and the Cervaro. The gulf is named after the town Manfredonia. Areas along the coast include marshes such as the Saline di Margherita di Savoia.
