= Daunians =

Iapygian tribe which inhabited northern Apulia in classical antiquity

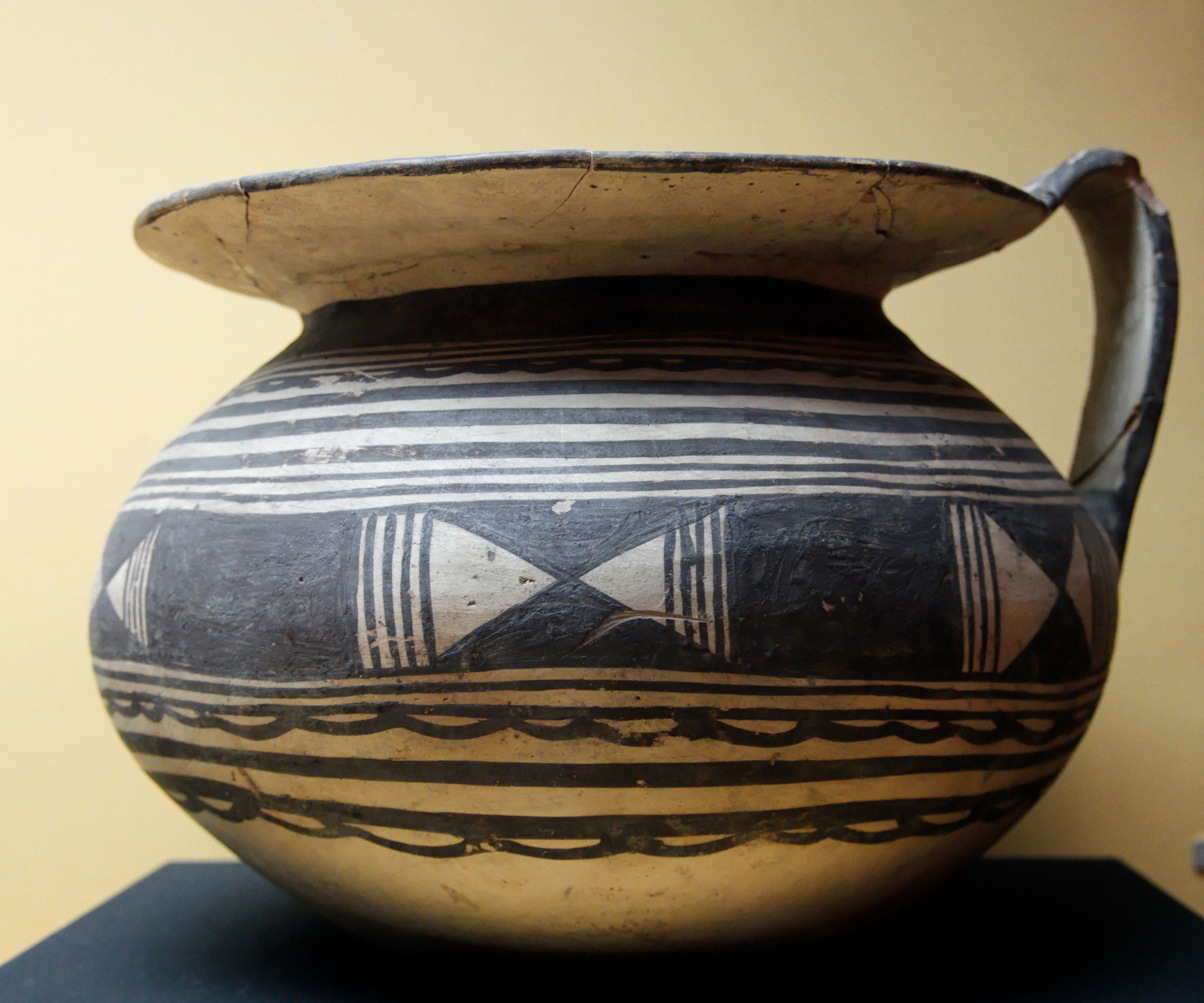
Daunian pot, Terracotta, Subgeometric style (Daunian II), 550-400 BC

The Daunians (Latin: Daunii) were a Iapygian tribe that inhabited northern Apulia in classical antiquity. Two other Iapygian tribes, the Peucetians and the Messapians, inhabited central and southern Apulia, respectively. Although all three tribes spoke the Messapic language, they had developed separate archaeological cultures by the seventh century BC.

The Daunians lived in the region of Daunia, which extended from the eastern slopes of the Daunian Mountains (in the southwest) to the Gargano peninsula (in the northeast). This region coincides mainly with the province of Foggia and part of the province of Barletta-Andria-Trani today. Daunians and Oscans came into contact in northern Daunia and southern Samnite regions. Gradually, parts of northern Daunia became "Oscanized".

== Name ==
The ethnonym is connected to the name of the wolf, plausibly the totemic animal of this nation. The cult of the wolf was widespread in ancient Italy and was related to the Arcadian mystery cult. Daunos means wolf, according to ancient glosses, and is cognate with Greek θαῦνον (thaunon) (compare θήριον (thērion) in the lexicon of Hesychius of Alexandria), from an Indo-European root *dhau- 'to strangle', meaning literally 'strangler'. Among the Daunian towns one may mention Lucera (Leucaria) and among other nations the ethnonym of the Lucani (Loucanoi) and that of the Hirpini, from another word meaning 'wolf'. The outcome of the Proto-Indo-European voiced aspirate *dh is proper to the Illyrian languages and so is different from the corresponding Latin faunus and Oscan, which is not attested.

The Messapic tribal name Daunioi/Daunii has been connected to the Dardanian Thunatae/Thunatai in the Balkans.

== Emergence ==
Trans-Adriatic migrations from the Western Balkans to Italy, confirmed by recent archaeological evidence dating to the period between 1700 BCE and 1400 BCE, in the post-Cetina horizon.

Recent archaeological evidence dating to the period between 1700 BCE and 1400 BCE in the post-Cetina horizon confirms trans-Adriatic migrations from the Western Balkans to southeastern Italy, which brought a Western Paleo-Balkan language to Apulia. However, the way in which Proto-Messapic speakers spread in Apulia and which pre-Indo-European languages that had existed in the region were thereby assimilated or displaced is still unknown. Developing their own identity, the Daunians emerged as a sub-tribe distinct from the rest of the Iapygians (Messapic-speakers) in the Iron Age.

The descendants of the tribes that arrived in Apulia, collectively known as the Iapygians, were the Peucetians, Messapians, and Daunians. The broader region was inhabited by Italic peoples of Southern Italy with whom the Iapygians maintained contacts; among them are the Ausones/Oscans, Sabines, Lucani, Paeligni, Bruttii, Campanians, Aequi, Samnites, and Frentani. Strabo, in a mythological construction to explain the foundation of Taranto, connects the Iapygians with Cretans. Strabo recounts that they were descendants of Iapyx and a Cretan woman. Archaeological material shows little contact between Iapygians and Greek colonists. The retroactive ascription of a Cretan or Arkadian heritage for the Iapygians was simply constructed for political purposes of the time these sources were written, and can be confidently attributed to mythology.

== Genetics ==
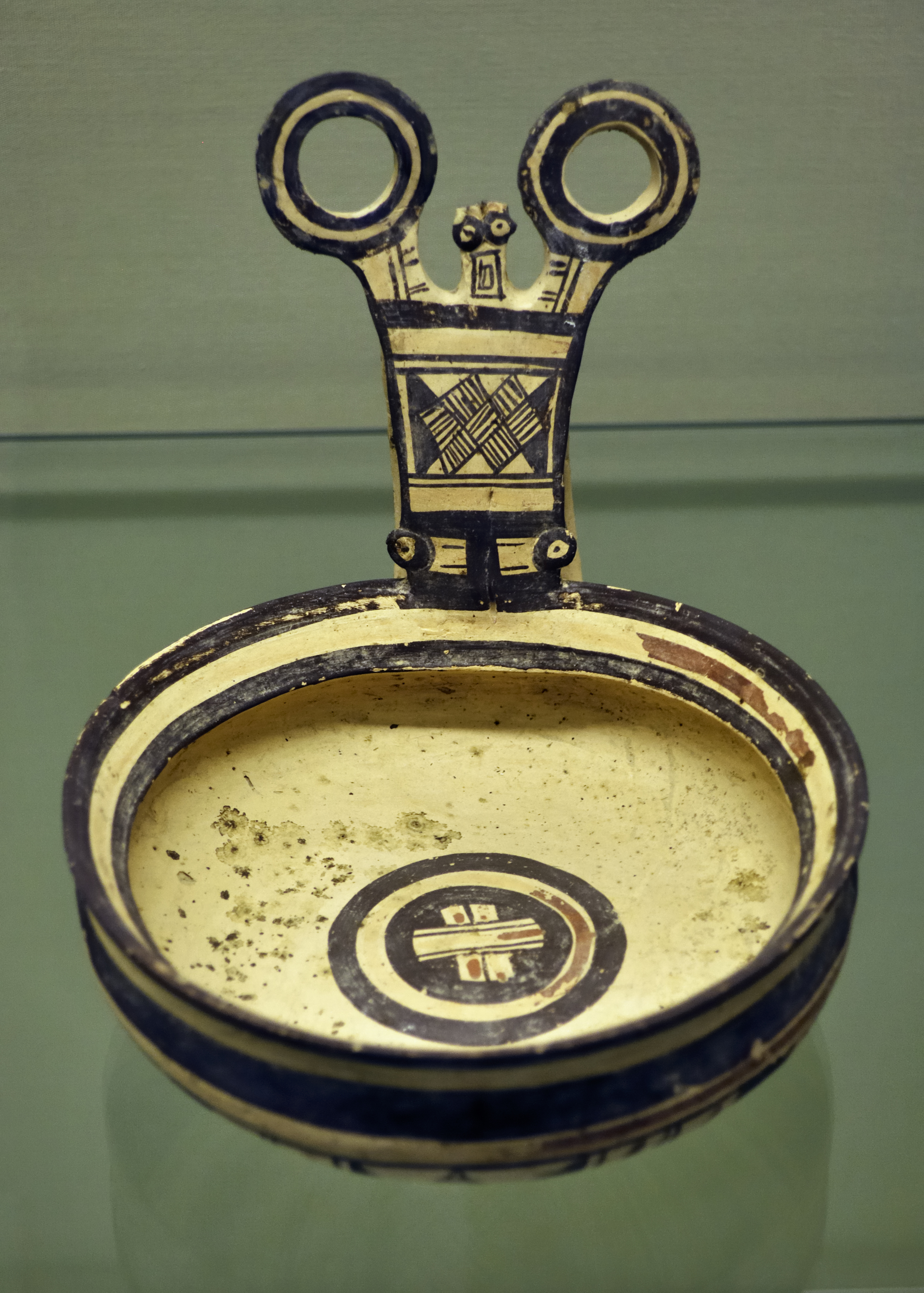
Daunian subgeometric Kyathos, 550–440 BC

A genetic study published in 2022 examined DNA extracted from three necropoleis: Ordona, Salapia and San Giovanni Rotondo, in the region of Apulia in southern Italy, which have been linked to the Daunian region during the Iron Age. Most samples from Ordona and Salapia date to the Daunian period and some samples from San Giovanni Rotondo date more broadly to the Iron Age. Paternal haplogroups of seven Iron Age samples were identified. Two paternal lineages of the Iron Age samples belong to J-M241, one of them could be further processed as J-L283+. Two Iron Age samples belonged to R-M269, one further designated as Z2103+ and one to I-M223.

Iron Age Daunians showed the highest autosomal affinity with Early Iron Age Illyrian populations from Croatia and populations that were formed in Italy in the Roman Republican era, which both can be broadly included in a pan-Mediterranean genetic continuum (stretching from Crete to Republican Rome and the Iberian Peninsula). Links to Minoans/Crete and Iron Age Greeks/Arkadia are less likely. A parsimonious explanation of the Daunian's origin favors a genetic continuity between the Daunians and the population that inhabited the area prior to the historical period that was analyzed, although additional influences from Croatia (ancient Illyria) cannot be excluded, as described by the material remains and the available historical sources.

== Presence in ancient Italy ==
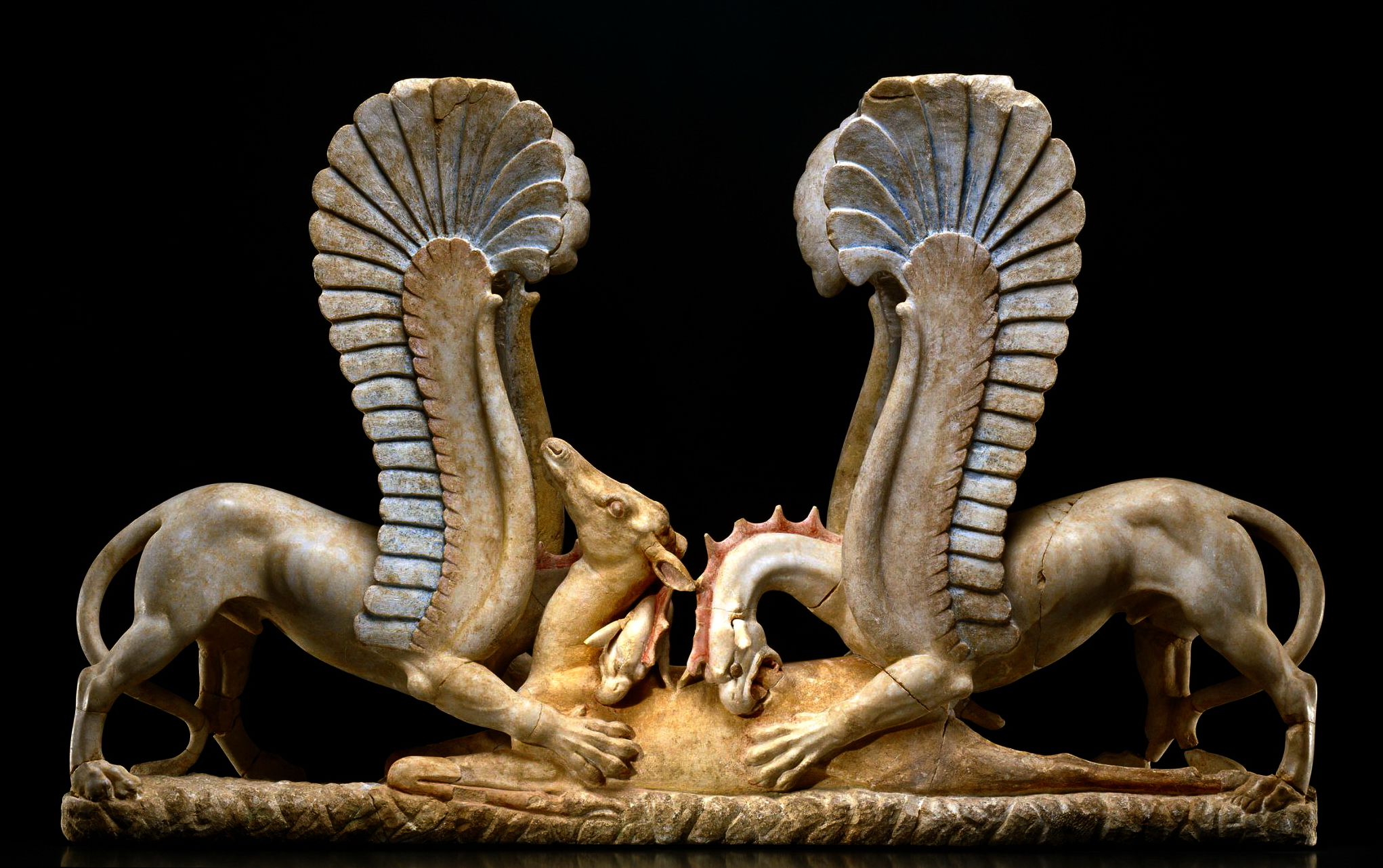
Table pedestal (trapezophoron) in polychrome marble with two griffins devouring a deer (from a Daunian grave of the 4th century BC).

The Daunii were similar to, but also different from, the Peucetii and Messapii, who settled in central and southern Puglia. Having been also less influenced by the Campanian civilization, it had thus a more peculiar culture, featuring in particular the Daunian steles, a series of funerary monuments sculpted in the 7th-6th centuries BC in the plain south of Siponto, and now mostly housed in the National Archeological Museum of Manfredonia. Particularly striking is the Daunian pottery (as yet little studied), which began with geometric patterns but eventually included crude human, bird and plant figures.

The main Daunian centers were Teanum Apulum (within the modern San Paolo di Civitate), Uria Garganica, the location of which though is not known with certainty, Casone, Lucera, Merinum (Vieste), Monte Saraceno (near Mattinata), Siponto, Coppa Nevigata, Cupola, Salapia (near Cerignola and Manfredonia), Arpi (near Foggia), Aecae (near Troia), Vibinum (Bovino), Castelluccio dei Sauri, Herdonia (Ordona), Ausculum (Ascoli Satriano), Ripalta (near Cerignola), Canosa di Puglia, Lavello and Venosa. Since its settlement, Messapic was in contact with the Italic languages of the region. In the centuries before Roman annexation, the frontier between Messapic and Oscan ran through Frentania-Irpinia-Lucania-Apulia, the transboundary region between Daunians and Oscan-speaking Italic groups. An "Oscanization" and "Samnitization" process gradually took place; this is attested in contemporary sources via the attestation of dual identities for settlements. In these regions, an Oscan/Lucanian population and a large Daunian element intermixed in different ways. Larinum, a settlement that has produced a large body of Oscan onomastics, is described as a "Daunian city" and Horace, who was from Venusia in the transboundary area between the Daunians and the Lucanians, described himself as "Lucanian or Apulian". The creation of Roman colonies in southern Italy after the early 4th century BCE had a great impact in the Latinization of the area.

There are numerous testimonies among ancient authors (Pseudo-Scylax, Virgil, Festus, Servius) of a presence of the Daunians beyond the Apennines in Campania and Latium where some towns claimed Diomedian origins. The most notable instance is Ardea, the centre of the Rutulians, who were considered Daunians: Vergil writes that Turnus' father was Daunus. Festus writes that a King Lucerus of Ardea fought along with Romulus against Titus Tatius and this is the origin of the name of the Roman Luceres.

== Culture ==
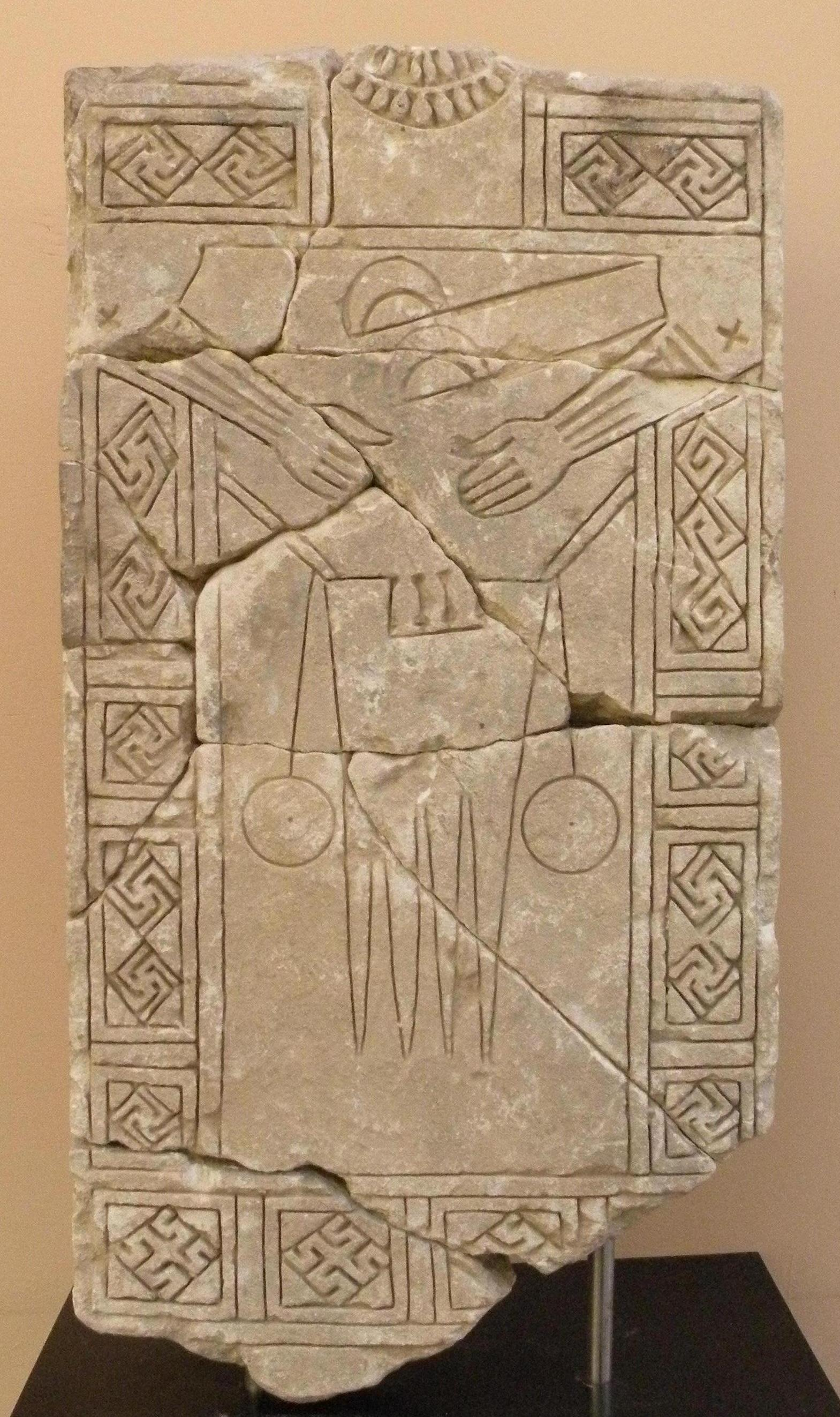
Daunian stele, limestone grave marker (?), 610-550 BC

The Iron Age Daunian material culture persisted quite different from their Italic neighbours until the region was encompassed into the Roman Republic in the 3rd century BC. This cultural distinction was due in part because of their geographical area, which was distant from the Ancient Greek centres of Magna Graecia, and in part because of their close relations with the peoples on the other coast of the Adriatic Sea with whom they retained direct contacts across the sea.

=== Tattooing ===
The custom of tattooing among Daunians can be detected in Daunian stelae and in matt-painted ollae. It can also be conceivably identified on the wall of a late 4th-century tomb chamber from Arpi, in which a painting shows tattoos on the arms of the 'priestess' riding a quadriga. The tattooing practice is most often found in preliterate tribal communities, with women playing the chief role, both performing the ritual of applying tattoos and wear them. Among other things the tattoos may have been a symbol of sexual maturity, ancestry and tribal affiliations, as well as religious beliefs. Forearms were the most common tattooed parts of the body among Daunians.

In the Graeco-Roman world, tattooing was conceived as a barbaric custom that was used exclusively for punitive or ownership purposes, but the Daunian perception of tattooing was different, as it was a deep and long-standing cultural embodiment distinguishing them from other cultures, as occurred among Illyrians and Thracians. The writings of ancient authors like Herodotus (5th century BC) and Strabo (1st century BC) show that, in the Balkans, tattooing was in the purview of the elites; iconographic and literary sources reveal in particular that it was restricted to the female members of society. In the western Balkans, isolated from outside influences, the practice of tattooing continued until the early 20th century in Albania and Bosnia, regions that in antiquity were part of the area of Illyria, where Daunian groups conceivably originated from. Besides of religious beliefs, the accounts of the early 20th century reveal that the tattooing custom in the Balkans was originally connected with a fertility rite, being associated with the beginning of menstruation, thus proving that a girl had become a woman.

== See also ==
- Calchus, mythological Daunian king
- Tavoliere delle Puglie
- Daunian pottery
- List of ancient Illyrian peoples and tribes

== Sources ==
- Aneli, Serena; Saupe, Tina; Montinaro, Francesco; Solnik, Anu; Molinaro, Ludovica; Scaggion, Cinzia; Carrara, Nicola; Raveane, Alessandro; Kivisild, Toomas; Metspalu, Mait; Scheib, Christiana; Pagani, Luca (2022). "The genetic origin of Daunians and the Pan-Mediterranean southern Italian Iron Age context". Molecular Biology and Evolution. 39 (2). doi:10.1093/molbev/msac014. PMC 8826970. PMID 35038748.
- Carpenter, T. H.; Lynch, K. M.; Robinson, E. G. D., eds. (2014). The Italic People of Ancient Apulia: New Evidence from Pottery for Workshops, Markets, and Customs. New York City, New York: Cambridge University Press. ISBN 9781139992701.
- Malkin, Irad (2003). Myth and Territory in the Spartan Mediterranean. Cambridge University Press. ISBN 052152024X.
- Matzinger, Joachim (2025). "Tria corda, oder die Sprachlandschaft des antiken Apuliens". In Emmanuel Dupraz; Antoine Viredaz (eds.). Langues Et Institutions en Italie Méridionale: Les Aires Osques Et Messapiennes Entre Grande-Grèce Et Rome. Schwabe Verlagsgruppe AG Schwabe Verlag. pp. 91–106. doi:10.24894/978-3-7965-5186-4. ISBN 978-3-7965-5186-4.
- Norman, Camilla (2018). "Illyrian Vestiges in Daunian Costume: tattoos, string aprons and a helmet". In Gianfranco De Benedittis (ed.). Realtà medioadriatiche a confronto: contatti e scambi tra le due sponde. Atti del convegno Termoli 22-23 luglio 2016. Campobasso: Università degli Studi del Molise. pp. 57–71.
- Šašel Kos, Marjeta (2010). "Peoples on the northern fringes of the Greek world: Illyria as seen by Strabo". In Jean-Luc Lamboley, Maria Paola Castiglioni (ed.). L'Illyrie méridionale et l'Épire dans l'Antiquité V: Actes du Ve colloque international de Grenoble (8–11 octobre 2008). L'Illyrie méridionale et l'Épire dans l'Antiquité (V). Vol. 2. De Boccard Editions. pp. 617–629. ISBN 9782951943339.
- Torelli, Mario (1995). Studies in the Romanization of Italy. University of Alberta. ISBN 0888642415.
