= Biccari =

- Comune
- Comune di Biccari
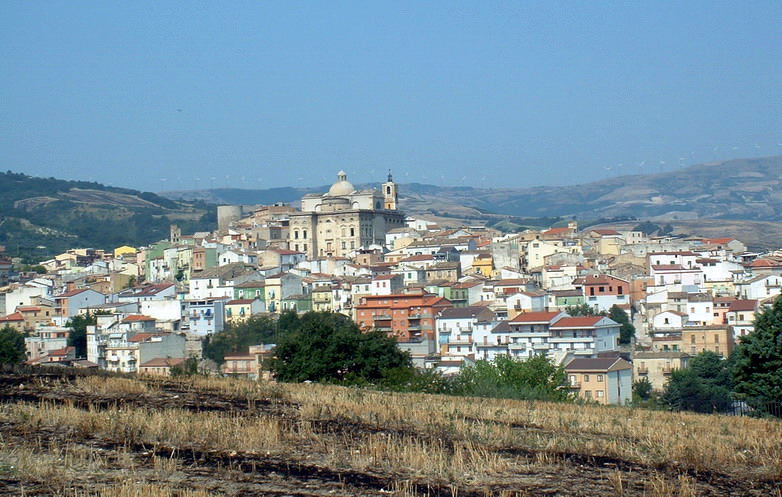
- View of Biccari

- Location within Italy Location within Apulia
- Coordinates: 41°24′N 15°12′E
- Country: Italy
- Region: Apulia
- Province: Foggia (FG)
- Frazioni: Tertiveri, Berardinone

Government
  - Mayor: Gianfilippo Mignogna (Biccari Cambia)

Area
  - Total: 106.65 km^{2} (41.18 sq mi)
- Elevation: 450 m (1,480 ft)

Population (31 December 2017)
  - Total: 2,760
  - Density: 25.9/km^{2} (67.0/sq mi)
- Demonym: Biccaresi
- Time zone: UTC+1 (CET)
  - Summer (DST): UTC+2 (CEST)
- Postal code: 71032
- Dialing code: 0881
- Patron saint: St. Donatus
- Saint day: 7 August
- Website: Official website

Biccari (Pugliese: Vìcchere) is a town and comune in the province of Foggia in the Apulia region of southeast Italy.

== Main sights ==
- Historic centre
- Byzantine tower of Biccari
- Tower Tertiveri
- Church of the Assumption of the Blessed Virgin Mary
- Convent of St. Anthony (1477)
- Church of the Annunciation
- Romanesque and Gothic church of San Quirico
- Cross roads of Port Wells (1473)
- Portal medieval Gallo Palace (Piazza Don Luigi Sturzo)
- Wooden altar carved and decorated in gold St. Michael (18th century)
- 800 Godfrey Palace with its majestic facades
- Fortified farms of Santa Maria and Imporchia
- Palazzo Pignatelli di Tertiveri
- Pescara Lake

== People ==
- John DePalma (Biccari, 1885 – 1951), American race car driver
- Ralph DePalma (Biccari, 1882 – South Pasadena, 1956), American race car driver

== See also ==
- Biccari Wikipedia page in Italian
