= Orsara di Puglia =

- Comune
- Comune di Orsara di Puglia
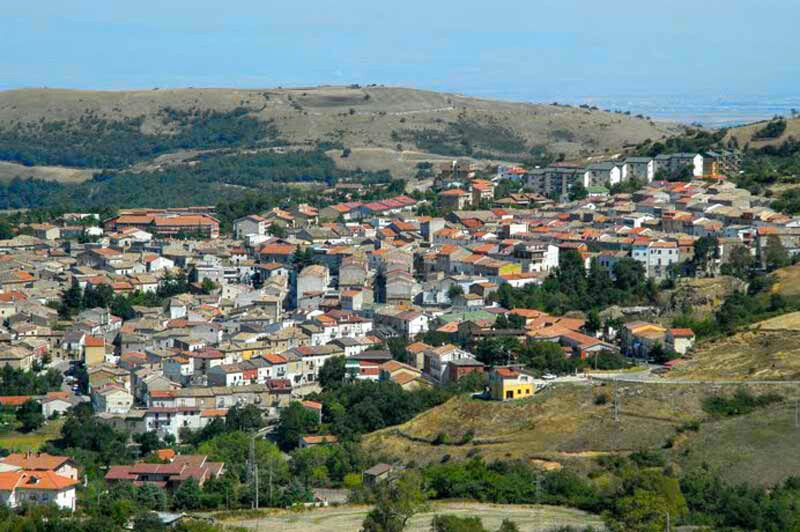
- View of Orsara di Puglia

- Location within Italy Location within Apulia
- Coordinates: 41°17′N 15°16′E
- Country: Italy
- Region: Apulia
- Province: Foggia (FG)
- Frazioni: Giardinetto, Torre Guevara

Area
  - Total: 82 km^{2} (32 sq mi)
- Elevation: 635 m (2,083 ft)

Population (2018-01-01)
  - Total: 3,268
  - Density: 40/km^{2} (100/sq mi)
- Demonym: Orsarese
- Time zone: UTC+1 (CET)
  - Summer (DST): UTC+2 (CEST)
- Postal code: 71027
- Dialing code: 0881
- Patron saint: S. Michele Arcangelo
- Saint day: September 29 and May 8
- Website: Official website

Orsara di Puglia is a small town and comune in the province of Foggia, Apulia, southern Italy.

Named as Orsara Dauno-Irpina between 1861 and 1884, the town was part of the province of Avellino until 1927.

== History ==
The origins of Orsara date back to antiquity, as can be deduced from some archaeological findings that attest to the contacts with the Osci and the Irpini. In Roman times it was affected by the Second Punic War while the Via Traiana, a variant of the more ancient Via Appia, passed along the course of the Sannoro stream.

In the 8th century, a community of Basilian monks settled there, dedicated to the cult of the archangel Michael, who was venerated in the cave that today takes his name. In the Middle Ages the town, named Castrum Ursariae, was equipped with walls, which protected it from foreign incursions. During Norman times, the court of Ripalonga were in defense of the Via Francigena. The knights of Calavera settled here during the mid 1200s and early 1300s.

=== Symbol ===
The coat of arms of the Municipality of Orsara di Puglia was granted by decree of the President of the Republic on 8 March 2006.

"In blue, to the bear placed on the left, accompanied by his cub, faced, both in black, upright and with the left paw raised, supported by the golden plain, all trained by the oak of green, whipped to the natural, nodrita in the plain. Exterior ornaments from the Municipality. "

== Demographics ==
=== Dialect & Language ===
Alongside the Italian language, the Dauno-Irpino dialect is also spoken in the commune.

=== Religion ===
Like most of Italy, the commune is largely Catholic. However there has been a large Waldensian presence, perhaps from Occitan people and American immigrants since 1900. A Waldensian church in the Saint Nicola parish was opened in 1934.

== Economy ==
The economy is essentially based on agriculture, with crops of wheat, broad beans, maize and sunflowers; there are poultry, sheep and goat farms. In recent years, food and wine tourism has had a strong boost, sealed by the recognition as a Slow Food city in 2007.

== Places of interest ==
- Parish church of San Nicola, dating back to the 16th century: it preserves a wooden statue of the Madonna della Neve, made in 1624 by the Neapolitan sculptor Aniello Stellato.
- Church of Santa Maria della Neve, built in the 17th century on an older building
- Abbey of Sant'Angelo or dell'Annunziata, built between the 8th and 11th centuries in Byzantine style and originally the monastery of Santi Nicandro and Marciano
- Convent of San Domenico, from the 11th century
- Grotta di San Michele Arcangelo, a pilgrimage destination from the 8th century
- Fountain of the Angel
- Fontana Nuova, (16th century)
- Baronial Palace, from the 13th century, with a tower with arched single lancet windows. It hosted the knights of Calatrava and later the Guevara family, who were lords of Orsara.
- Torre Guevara, built in the second half of the 17th century by Duke Guevara di Bovino. In the early 18th century it was the hunting residence of Charles III of Bourbon.

== Festivals ==
The following are festivals celebrated in the town:

- 8 May - anniversary of the apparition of St. Michael the Archangel;
- Penultimate Sunday of June - wine festival;
- Last week of July / Before August - High Specialization Jazz Festival and Seminars "Orsara Jazz Festival & Orsara Jazz Summer Camp" which has been held since 1990;
- 5 August - feast of the Madonna della Neve;
- 29 September - feast of St. Michael the Archangel;
- November 1 - fuoc acost and cocc 'priatorj According to tradition, the souls of Purgatory return to earth on the evening of All Saints, therefore the people of Orsara decorate the streets of the town with pumpkins, which symbolize souls ( cocce priatorje ), and light bonfires of dry branches of broom (fuoc acost, from the Greek akostòi, scattered), to console them. The typical dessert, common to many southern towns (cooked wheat mixed with pomegranate grains and chopped walnuts and seasoned with vincotto) has the original name musc'tagl ', perhaps from the French mouche taille.
