= Daunian Mountains =

Mountain range in Southern Apennines, Italy

Coordinates: 41°22′00″N 15°09′00″E

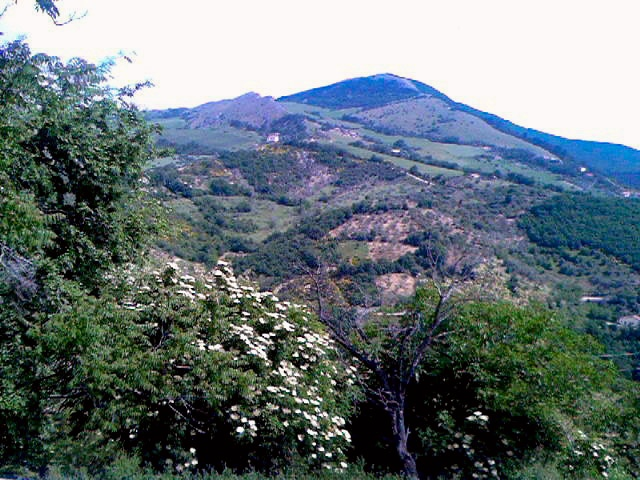
View of Daunian Mountains.

Daunian Mountains (in Italian Monti della Daunia or Monti Dauni, or also improperly Subappennino Dauno) are a mountain range in southern Italy, constituting the eastern appendix of the Campanian Apennines. They occupy the western fringe of Capitanata and the border of Apulia with Molise and Campania; the range takes its name from an ancient tribe, the Dauni, although it was strongly held by Hirpini instead.

== Overview ==
The mountains and hills are bounded northwards by the Fortore valley, eastwards by the Tavoliere delle Puglie, southwards by the upper Ofanto valley. The chain is formed by sandstone terrains, and is the source of a series of small streams which flow through the Tavoliere into the Adriatic Sea. The highest peak is Monte Cornacchia, at 1,151 metres (3,776 ft).

Historically, the Daunian Mountains have suffered a substantial depopulation in the last decades, due to their relative isolation. They include 21 comuni, all in the province of Foggia, which form two mountain communities (Comunità Montana dei Monti Dauni Settentrionali , with seat at Casalnuovo Monterotaro, and the Comunità Montana dei Monti Dauni Meridionali, at Bovino).

== Highest peaks ==
Mount	Altitude
Monte Cornacchia	1,151 m
Monte Saraceno	1,145 m
Monte Crispignano	1,105 m
Toppo Pescara	1,078 m
Monte Sidone	1,061 m
Monte Vento	1,056 m
Monte Pagliarone	1,030 m
Monte Tre Titoli	1,030 m
Monte San Vito	1,015 m
Monte Stillo	1,010 m
