= Luconia =

Luconia may refer to:

- An alternative name for Thiallela, a genus of moths
- A historic name for the Philippine island of Luzon
- The Luconia Shoals, a reef complex off the north coast of Borneo

For similar names, see

- Laconia (disambiguation)
- Lucania (disambiguation)
