= Lacon =

Lacon may refer to:

== People ==
- Demetrius Lacon (late 2nd century BC), Greek philosopher
- Lacon baronets, of the English baronetcy
- Lacon family, a Sardinian dynasty
- Edmund Lacon (1807–1888), English politician
- Roland Lacon (c. 1537 – 1608), English politician
- William Lacon (c. 1540 – 1609), English politician
- Lacon D. Stockton, judge in Iowa, USA in 1856–1860

== Places ==
- Lacon, Alabama
- Lacon, Illinois
- Lacon Township, Marshall County, Illinois

== Other ==
- Lacon (beetle), a click beetle genus
- L.A.con (disambiguation), four World Science Fiction Conventions held in Anaheim, California, United States
- Oliver Lacon, a character in spy novels of John le Carré
- Lacon, one of the dogs that tore apart Actaeon

== See also ==
- Laconia (disambiguation)
