= Lacona =

Lacona may refer to:

Italy

- Lacona, Capoliveri

United States

- Lacona, Iowa
- Lacona, New York

See also

- Laconia (disambiguation)
