= Conza (disambiguation) =

Conza may refer to:

== Places of Italy ==
Municipalities

- Conza della Campania (commonly Conza), municipality of the Province of Avellino
- Castelnuovo di Conza, municipality of the Province of Salerno
- Sant'Andrea di Conza, municipality of the Province of Avellino

Other place names

- Lago di Conza, a lake of Campania in the Province of Avellino
- Sella di Conza, a mountain pass of Campania between the provinces of Salerno and Avellino

== Personalities ==
- Alfonso Gesualdo de Conza (1540-1603), an Italian cardinal
- Landulf of Conza (???-979), Italian nobleman

== See also ==
- Count of Conza, a Renaissance title held by several noble Italian families of Campania
- Compsa, the ancient city nearby the modern Conza
