= Canosa di Puglia =

Canosa di Puglia Canaus (Neapolitan)
- Comune
- Comune di Canosa di Puglia
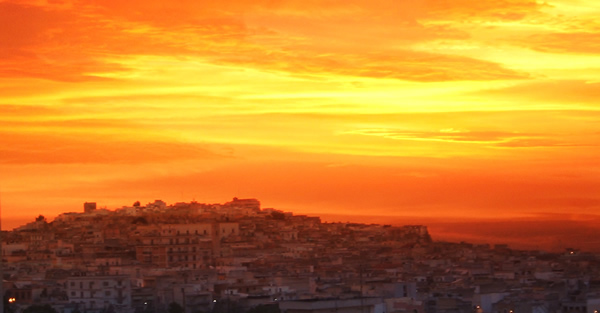

- Flag Coat of arms
- Nicknames: La Piccola Roma ("Little Rome"); "The City of Princes, Emperors and Bishops"
- Motto: Città d'Arte e Cultura ("City of Art and Culture")
- Location within Italy Location within Apulia
- Coordinates: 41°13′N 16°4′E
- Country: Italy
- Region: Apulia
- Province: Barletta-Andria-Trani (BAT)
- Founded: 6000-3000 BC
- Frazioni: Loconia

Government
  - Mayor: Vito Malcangio (Right Wind)

Area
  - Total: 150.93 km^{2} (58.27 sq mi)
- Elevation: 105 m (344 ft)
- Highest elevation: 249 m (817 ft)
- Lowest elevation: 31 m (102 ft)

Population (31 December 2017)
  - Total: 29,847
  - Density: 197.75/km^{2} (512.18/sq mi)
- Demonym: Canosini
- Time zone: UTC+1 (CET)
  - Summer (DST): UTC+2 (CEST)
- Postal code: 76012
- Dialing code: 0883
- Patron saint: Sabinus of Canosa
- Saint day: August 1
- Website: Official website

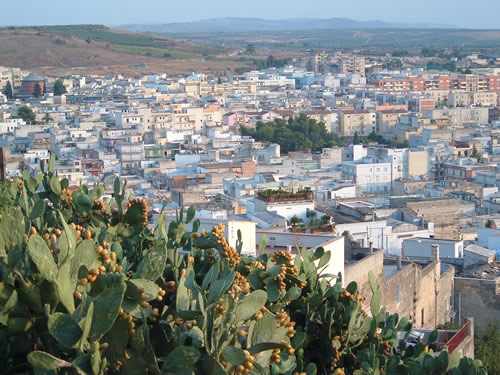
Panorama of Canosa di Puglia

Canosa di Puglia, generally known simply as Canosa (Canosino: Canaus), is a town and comune in the province of Barletta-Andria-Trani, Apulia, southern Italy. It is located between Bari and Foggia, not far from Barletta on the northwestern edge of the plateau of the Murgia which dominates the Ofanto valley and the extensive plains of Tavoliere delle Puglie, ranging from Mount Vulture at the Gargano, to the Adriatic coast. Canosa, the Roman Canusium, is considered the principal archaeological center of Apulia, and is one of the oldest continually inhabited cities in Italy. A number of vases and other archaeological finds are located in local museums and private collections. It is not far from the position on the Ofanto River where the Romans found refuge after the defeat of the Battle of Cannae and is the burial place of Bohemund I of Antioch.

== Name ==
Canosa is the Italian development of the Latin Canusium, derived from the Greek Kanýsion (Κανύσιον), whose origin is uncertain. According to the Latin commentator Servius, Canusium derived from canis ("dog"), an animal associated with the local worship of Aphrodite. Other derivations include from Greek kháneon (χάνεον, "wicker basket"), from the abundant wicker growing along the Ofanto; the Hebrew chanuth ("tavern"); and the Etruscan name Canzna.

== Geography ==
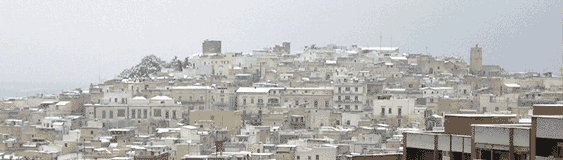
Rare snow in Canosa di Puglia.

=== Territory ===
Canosa sits on the right bank of the Ofanto river (the ancient Aufidus) and is nearly 20 kilometers (12 mi) from the Adriatic Sea. The town sits upon the Murgia plateau, between 105 and 140 meters (344 and 459 ft) above sea level. The city is built on a mostly sandy or clay surface that covers a limestone layer ("calcareniti of Gravina") which in turn constitutes the typical white-yellowish tuff and is easily collapsible. This morphological feature allowed the underground construction of artificial grottoes (used in the 19th century as cellars), and the creation of a Hypogeum. The tuff derived from the excavations has gone towards the construction of buildings on the surface. There are risks of subsidence due to the presence of caves and underground channels typical of karst environments. The buildings of the town of Canosa are considered high risk for collapse. In recent years there have been many building failures and disruptions of roads. The area extends south to the slopes of the Murgia, and is mostly flat. The basins of Rendina and Locone contribute to the large area 150 square kilometers (58 mi^{2}).

=== Climate ===
Canosa has a typical temperate climate, mild spring and autumn, and cold winters and mild summers. The monthly average temperature is strongly influenced by the Murgiano Range from 8.6 °C (47 °F) in January, to 27.2 °C (81 °F) in August. The average annual rainfall is 547 millimetres (21.5 in) of rainfall, distributed mainly in the period from September to April. Climate classification of Canosa is Climate zone C.

Climate data for Canosa di Puglia (1991–2020 normals)
Month	Jan	Feb	Mar	Apr	May	Jun	Jul	Aug	Sep	Oct	Nov	Dec	Year
Mean daily maximum °C (°F)	12.4 (54.3)	13.8 (56.8)	16.5 (61.7)	20.6 (69.1)	25.7 (78.3)	30.4 (86.7)	33.0 (91.4)	33.0 (91.4)	27.6 (81.7)	23.1 (73.6)	17.8 (64.0)	13.5 (56.3)	22.3 (72.1)
Daily mean °C (°F)	8.6 (47.5)	9.4 (48.9)	11.7 (53.1)	15.2 (59.4)	20.0 (68.0)	24.5 (76.1)	27.2 (81.0)	27.2 (81.0)	22.4 (72.3)	18.2 (64.8)	13.6 (56.5)	9.7 (49.5)	17.3 (63.2)
Mean daily minimum °C (°F)	4.7 (40.5)	4.9 (40.8)	6.9 (44.4)	9.8 (49.6)	14.3 (57.7)	18.7 (65.7)	21.3 (70.3)	21.5 (70.7)	17.2 (63.0)	13.3 (55.9)	9.4 (48.9)	5.8 (42.4)	12.3 (54.2)
Average precipitation mm (inches)	53.6 (2.11)	41.1 (1.62)	58.6 (2.31)	49.0 (1.93)	43.7 (1.72)	31.4 (1.24)	20.9 (0.82)	21.8 (0.86)	49.5 (1.95)	55.3 (2.18)	64.0 (2.52)	62.5 (2.46)	551.4 (21.72)
Average precipitation days (≥ 1.0 mm)	9.6	8.8	10.3	11.3	10.3	6.6	4.5	5.2	7.9	8.3	11.0	12.2	106
Source: Istituto Superiore per la Protezione e la Ricerca Ambientale

== History ==
=== Prehistory ===
The ancient Greeks and Romans ascribed the foundation of Canusion or Canusium to the Homeric hero Diomedes, but archeologists have established human presence in the area back to the 7th millennium BC. The Diomedea fields were one of the main centers of the Dauni, a northern branch of the Iapyges, during the Neolithic (6th to 4th millennia BC). Toppicelli on the Ofantina plain has revealed buildings and tombs of a rich aristocracy that also seem related to this group.

Excavations have also discovered metal and amber designs which appear Etruscan.

=== Antiquity ===
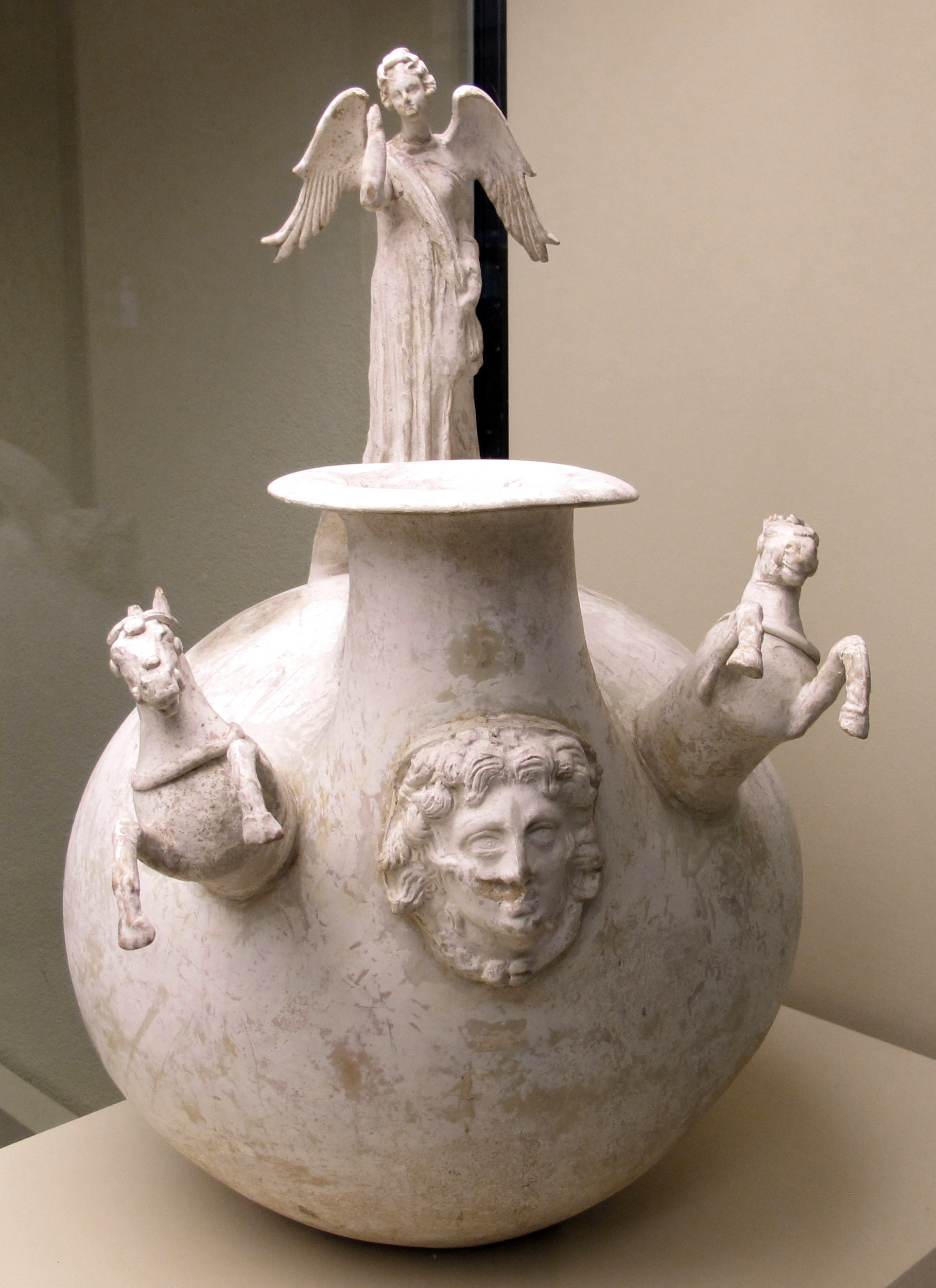
A Greek pottery askos from Canosa di Puglia, depicting goddess Nike, the head of Medusa, and horses, 3rd century BC

Canusion became an important commercial center for craftsman, especially of ceramics and pottery. Probably settled by the Pelasgians, it became a Greek polis by the time of the development of Magna Grecia. This Hellenistic city—located at the site of the present urban core—first appears in the historical record as an ally of the Samnites in their wars against Rome but was either subdued or voluntarily switched sides in 318 BC, after which it served as a Roman ally. Following Hannibal's 216 BC victory over the consuls Paullus and Varro at nearby Cannae, Canosa protected the fleeing remnants of the Roman army within its walls. In the second year of the Social War, it joined the rebels and successfully resisted a Roman siege. During that conflict or the civil wars that followed, it seems to have suffered greatly and been much reduced in size, although it improved its status to a self-governing municipality (municipium) in 88 BC and protected those privileges throughout the conflicts. A list of its local senators has been recovered from the ruins.

The town was a center for agricultural production and trade, particularly in Apulian wool. Horace's Satires complain of the area's gritty bread and bad water but note that the people were still fluent in both Latin and Greek. Its coins continued to bear Greek inscriptions through the Roman period. The Via Traiana reached the town in AD 109 and the ruins of a large gateway still honor that emperor. The city also boasted a very large amphitheater. It became a Roman colony (colonia) under Marcus Aurelius. Herodes Atticus oversaw the process and constructed an aqueduct, completed in 141. Antoninus Pius made it the capital of the Province of Apulia and Calabria. Towards the end of the 3rd century it became the capital of Apulia and Calabria II Royal.

=== Middle Ages ===
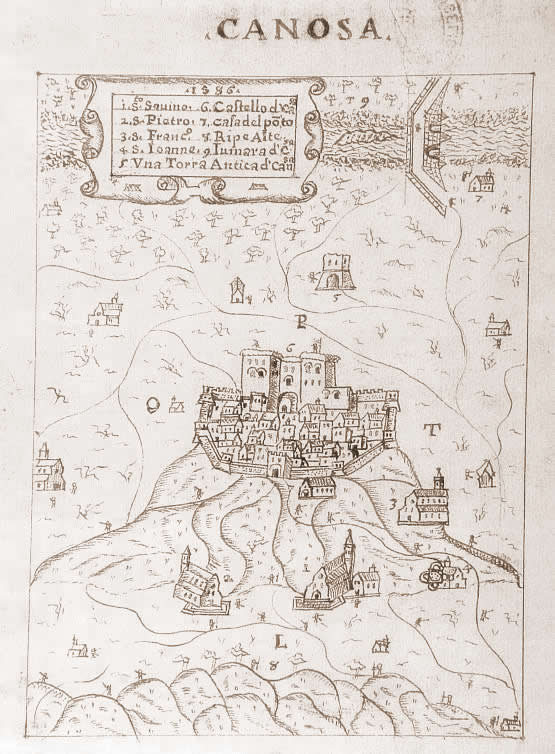
Medieval map of Canosa.

The city continued to flourish into the early medieval period, when it became known as the "city of bishops". Some of its bishops are known from the 4th century. Bishop Stercorius took part in the 343 Council of Sardica, and Bishop Probus intervened decisively against a Spanish bishop who wanted to name his own successor in a council convoked at Rome by Pope Hilarius in 465. The diocese reached its apogee under St Sabinus (514–566), who subsequently was honored as the town's patron saint.

The area suffered severely at the hands of the Lombards during the invasion that established the Duchy of Benevento and the Muslim invasions which followed. In the early 9th century, Muslims entirely destroyed the town and, in 844, Bishop Angelarius translated the relics of SS Rufinus, Memorus, and Sabinus to Bari. Soon after, Pope Sergius II confirmed him as the bishop of Bari and Canosa, a united title borne by Bari's archbishops until 1986. (Note: Ashby, however, claims that the diocese was translated to Andria in 1818.) (It remains a titular see.)

In 963, Canosa was rebuilt at a site below the former Roman city. It remained a Lombard gastaldate until the Norman conquest that established the Kingdom of Sicily. Under Bohemund I of Antioch (d. 1111), son of Robert Guiscard, it regained some of its earlier importance. The 5-domed cathedral of St Sabinus was completed in 1101. Bohemund's tomb is located just to its south. Following the extirpation of the Hohenstaufens, however, it again went into decline.

=== Modernity ===
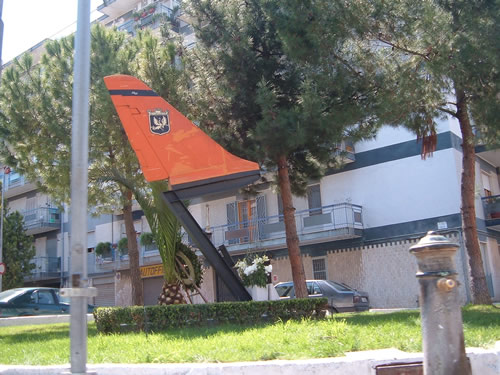
Piazzetta Volturino

The ruins and settlement of Canosa were repeatedly damaged by earthquakes, particularly those in 1361, 1456, 1627, 1659, 1694, and 1851. The town was also repeatedly sacked, notably by the Tarantini in 1451 and by Napoleon in 1803. As a fief, it was controlled by the Casati, the Orsini of Balzo, the Grimaldi of Monaco, the Gemmis family of Castelfoce, the Affaitati of Barletta, and the Capece Minutolo of Naples. Tiberio Capece was named "prince of Canosa" in 1712.

After the Italian Wars of Independence and the disastrous earthquake in 1851, Canosa remained predominantly bourgeois town as demonstrated by the construction of palaces. Virtually unscathed by World War I, the town suffered the effects of the 1930 Irpinia earthquake, which caused enormous damage.

On 6 November 1943, during World War II, the area was bombed by the Allies shortly after the armistice of 8 September. Some buildings were damaged, including the churches of San Francesco and San Biagio and the Town Hall, and 57 people lost their lives. In April 2001 the City of Canosa was awarded the bronze medal for Civil Valor in remembrance of the tragedy. On 17 September 1962, by decree of the President, Canosa was awarded the title of City for its historical traditions and the merits acquired by the community. In 1980 Canosa was again damaged by an earthquake.

Currently the economy of Canosa is based mainly on agriculture, with a service sector (archaeological, tourism) and industry and handicrafts, including textiles, food processing and manufacturing.

== Main sights ==
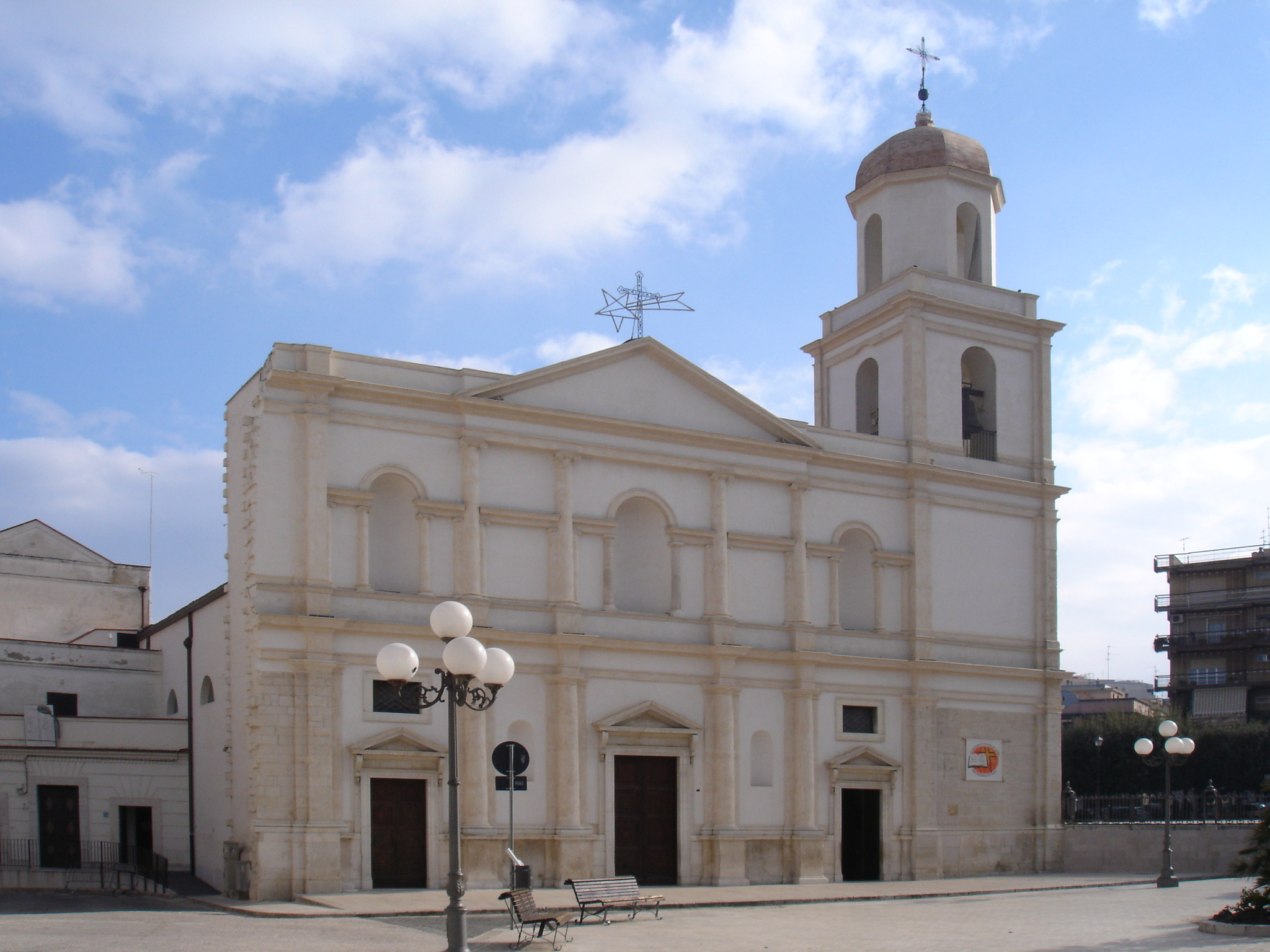
Cathedral of San Sabino

=== Religious architecture ===
==== Cathedral of San Sabino ====
The Cathedral of San Sabino was founded in the 8th century by the Lombards Duke Arechis II of Benevento, after the abandonment of early Christian sites in San Leucio and St. Peter. Originally dedicated to Saints John and Paul, was named after Saint Sabinus of Canosa on 7 September 1101, by Pope Paschal II, some four hundred years after the transfer of the saint's remains in the crypt. It was recognized as a cathedral in 1916 by Pope Benedict XV.

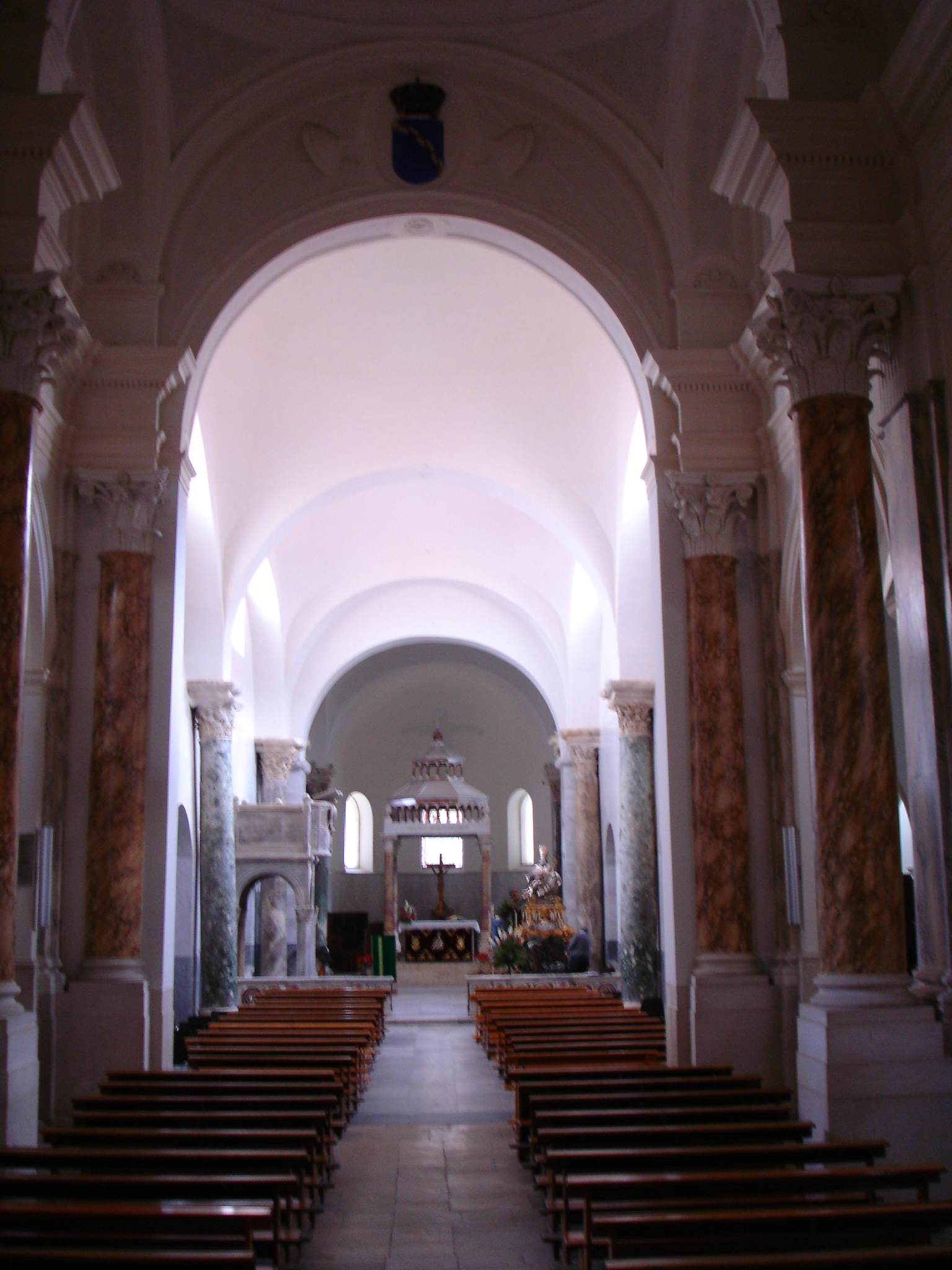
Nave of the basilica of San Sabino.

The plan of the basilica is a Latin cross, covered by five domes and an apse lit by three windows, whose central body is covered with a stained-glass window depicting the patron saint. It is an example of Romanesque/Byzantine architecture. Below the chancel are the crypt, shrine of the saint. The arches are supported by marble columns with Corinthian capitals, which were retrieved from devastated ancient monuments. The cathedral lies three feet below the square.

After the earthquake of 1851, the cathedral was damaged and the restoration work led to an expansion of the Latin cross, as well as the reconstruction of the facade in local tuff with three portals, each corresponding to the aisles. The chapels contain in order: a baptismal font, a fresco, an altar dedicated to Our Lady of the Fountain (protectress of Canosa) whose icon came after the First Crusade, in the adjacent Mausoleum of Bohemond, the wooden statue and a painting of Alphonsus Maria de Liguori, and the tomb of Blessed Father Antonio Maria Losito (1838–1917).

The left aisle houses the tomb of the Bishop of Lecce Archbishop Francesco Minerva (1904–2004) following three chapels: one containing the relics, chalices, crucifixes, and a silver bust of the saint enclosed by an iron grating, and the other dedicated to Saint Anthony (but with canvas representing Saint Francis of Assisi), the third devoted to Saint Anne. On the left arm of a Latin cross are two other chapels that of the St. Sacramento containing the statue of the Sacred Heart and the other of Saint Joseph.

Bishop's Throne, sculpted by Romualdo between 1079-1089.

The presbytery has a high altar with ciborium, set on a marble base with three steps, surmounted by a canopy supported by four red marble columns with Corinthian capitals, octagonal pyramid in two sections held up a total of 48 columns of the same marble, very similar to that in the Basilica of San Nicola di Bari.

==== Mausoleum of Bohemond ====
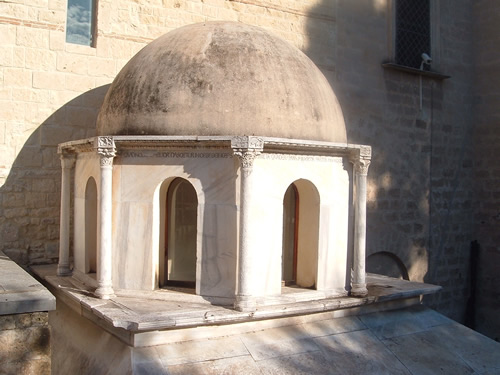
Dome of the Mausoleum of Bohemond

Accessible from the right transept of the cathedral is the Mausoleum of Bohemond (visitors must ask a church official to unlock the door which gives access.) Erected sometime after 1111, the little building has an upper part characterized by a polygonal drum surmounted by a hemispherical dome. Opposite the door to the Mausoleum is a stone carved heraldic device, a Lion Rampant, the style of which appears contemporary with Bohemond, and could therefore represent his personal coat of arms. An asymmetrical bronze double door (now preserved in the side chapel in the adjoining Basilica of Our Lady of the Fountain) was probably created by Roger Melfi (11th century). Inside, in addition to the columns, one going deep, there is on the marble floor the word "boamvndvs".

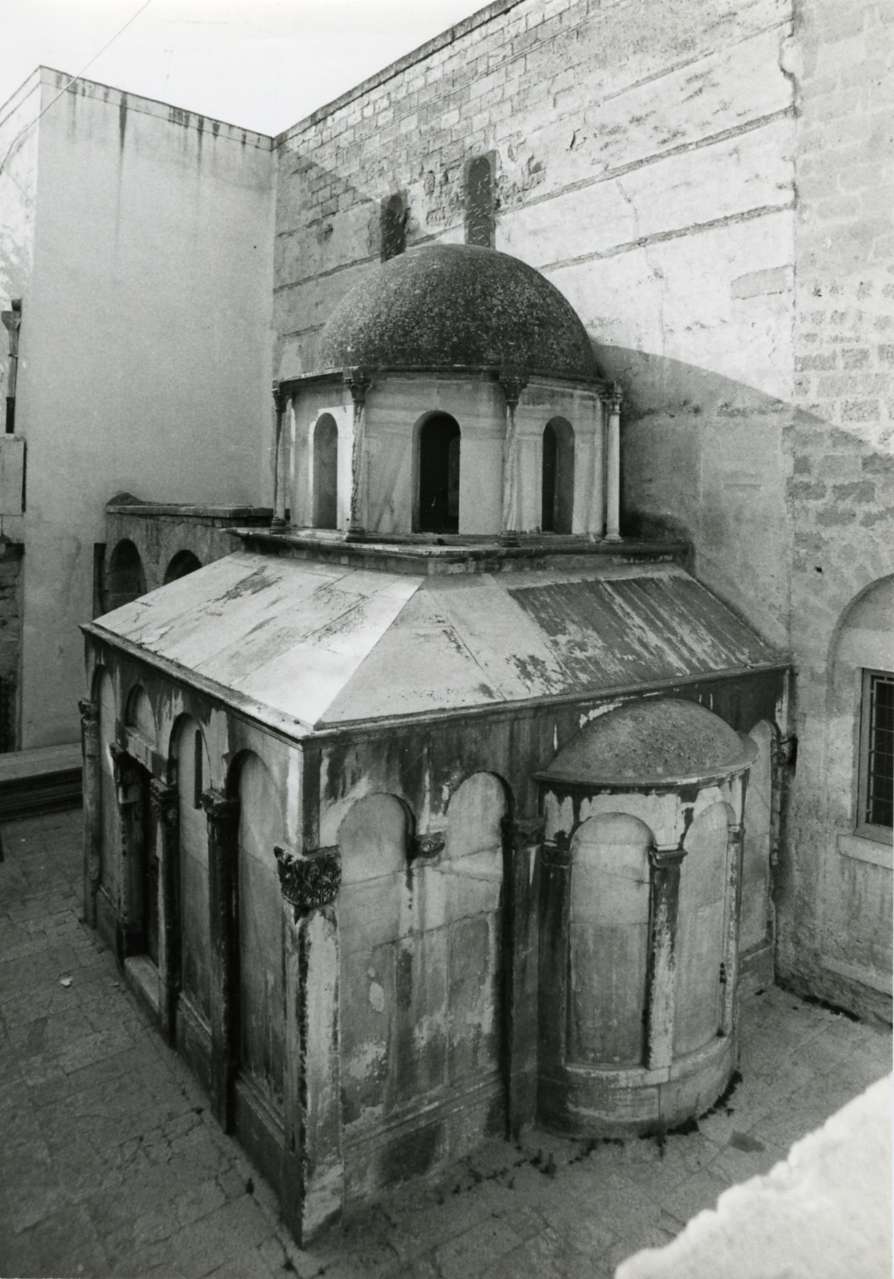
Dome of the Mausoleum of Bohemond. Picture by Paolo Monti. Fondo Paolo Monti, BEIC

==== Other churches ====
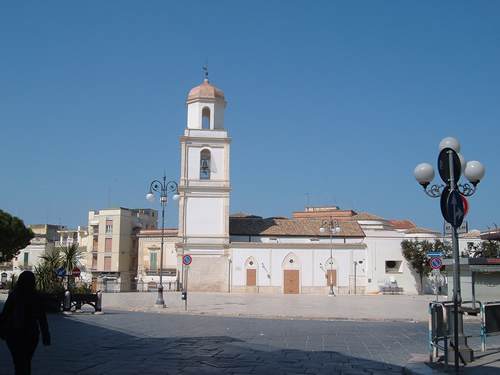
Piazza Vittorio Veneto Church

- Church of St. Anthony of Padua
- Church of St. Catherine
- Church of Saints Francis and Blaise
- Church of Saint Lucia and Teodoro, also called the Blessed Purgatory
- Church of Our Lady of the Assumption
- Church of Our Lady of Constantinople
- Church of Maria Immacolata
- Church of Maria del Caramel and Carmine
- Church of Maria del Rosario O Rosal
- Church of Passion of Jesus Christ (Rector)
- Church of Jesus the Liberator
- Church of Jesus, Joseph and Mary -
- Church of St. John the Baptist
- Church of St. Therese of the Child Jesus -

=== Civil architecture ===
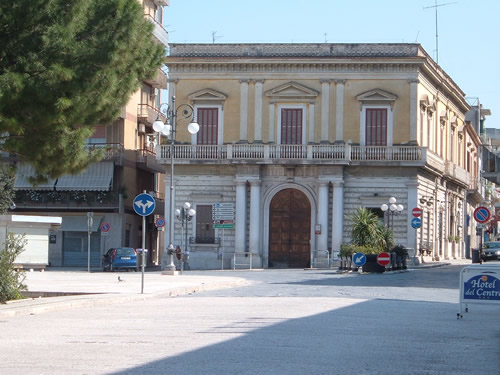
Palazzo Fracchiolla-Minerva

==== Historical buildings ====
The center of the city is littered with 18th- and 19th-century buildings of great artistic and aesthetic value.

- Casieri palace
- Iliceto palace, housing a puppet museum (19th-20th centuries).
- Palazzo Scocchera Santa
- Palazzo Barbarossa
- Rossi Palace
- Palazzo Sinesi, containing 400 findings dating back to the 4th-3rd centuries BC.
- Palace De Muro Fiocco
- Palazzo Fracchiolla-Minerva
- City Palace
- Caporale palace
- Palazzo Visconti
- Palace Forino on via De Gasperi
- Mazzini School via Piave

==== Teatro D'Ambra ====
The city 's historic theater is the Teatro D'Ambra, now owned by the city and renamed Teatro Comunale. Its construction was commissioned by Raffaele Lembo, a wealthy local grain merchant, and dates to 1923. The draft prepared by engineer and architect Arturo Boccasini of Barletta, had designed the Teatro Di Lillo of Barletta and had collaborated on the project of Teatro Margherita di Bari. The theater was opened in late 1926 when, with scarce economic resources, they completed part of the structure including without ornaments and decorations. Purchased by the City of Canosa and delivered to the city on 5 February 2005, the historic theater will be completely renovated and restored to house performances again. In May 2006 the renovation work were frozen after of an exceptional archaeological discovery, which was found under the gallery of the theater. This is a complicated intersection of Imperial age with some structures being from the Archaic Age (8th-7th centuries BC).

=== Other ===
==== Villa Comunale ====
The Villa Comunale, the center of Canosa, has its origins in the 19th century. Mayor Vincent Sinesi who in 1888 arranged the building adjacent to the Cathedral and the Mausoleum of Bohemond to be donated to the municipality by a few Canosa families. Beyond the Mausoleum of Bohemond, there is a monument dedicated to Scipio Africanus, and an altar commemorating the fallen of all wars. The lapidarium is composed of a remarkable archaeological heritage with Dauna and Roman inscriptions, funerary reliefs, capitals and columns, lintels, and the well of the imperial villas.

=== Archaeological sites ===
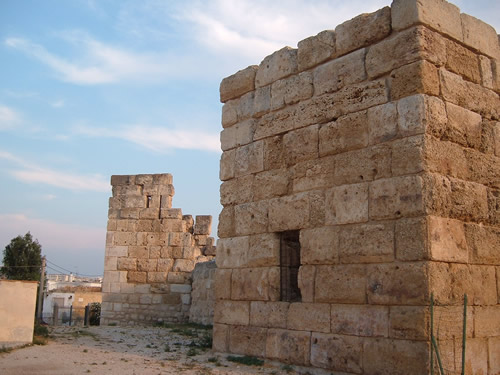
Canosa Castle.

==== Castle ====
The "castle" is actually the acropolis of ancient Canosa (Castrum Canus). The three great towers are the ruins of the eponymous estate located atop the hill overlooking the valley Ofantina. Originally a place of worship and pre-Roman fort, built of tufa blocks was rebuilt as a bastion of the same materials by the Grimaldi. Last owners, from 1856, were the Prince of Canosa Capece Minutolo of Naples, and remained until 1948. The wear of the blocks that compose it and the color denotes the passage of these various civilizations that have developed the structure in different epochs. The castle has also reported damage after the devastating bombing of the Second World War. Along the steep hill of the Acropolis, there is the old part of the country, with its narrow streets and staircases. At the southern base lie the remains of a Roman amphitheater.

==== Hypogeum and catacombs ====
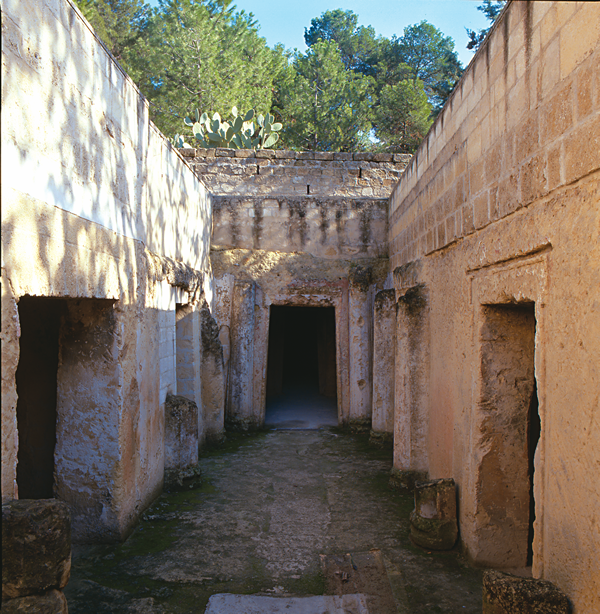
Lagrasta Catacombs.

Canosa has ancient Hypogea (many probably still hidden). These were used first by Dauni as pagan catacombs, and, within them, celebrated funerary cults, demonstrating an advanced civilization in the vast era from 6000 BC to 2nd century AD). The burials in the tombs continued to Roman times. The tombs contained, in addition to the deceased (often found in the fetal position), personal items found in urns or deposited in niches. Over the years, however, many of these artifacts (including precious jewelry in gold and bronze, pottery, red figures and askos) have been lost (or in private hands) due to grave robbers. Often these sites have frescoes with an allegorical passage of the deceased to take in the afterlife (for deductio ad inferos). The most important are those of the Cerberus, Lagrasta, Boccaforno and the Hoplite. Other exhibits recovered at the local Museum.

Not far from the town lies in the depths of clay soil, the necropolis of Santa Sofia. Used around the 4th century AD, for early Christians, it extended over other tombs dating back to the time of the persecution against the Christians. It was discovered around 1960 and is undergoing restoration. Other hypogeum and catacombs include:

- Ori Tomb (4th century BC)
- Ipogei Monterisi-Rossignoli (4th century BC)
- Varrese Tomb (4th century BC)
- Hypogeum Cerberus (4th century BC)
- Ipogeo Scocchera A (4th century BC)
- Ipogeo Scocchera B (called Ipogeo Boccaforno, 4th century BC)
- Ipogei Casieri (4th century BC)
- Hypogeum Vessel Dario (4th century BC)
- Ipogei Lagrasta (2nd century BC)
- Ipogeo dell'Oplita (2nd century BC)
- Ipogeo Matarrese
- Ipogeo Reimers
- Tomb of Largo Constantinople (3rd century BC)
- Necropolis of Santa Sofia (2nd-4th century AD)

==== Temples and archaic churches ====
===== Basilica di San Leucio =====
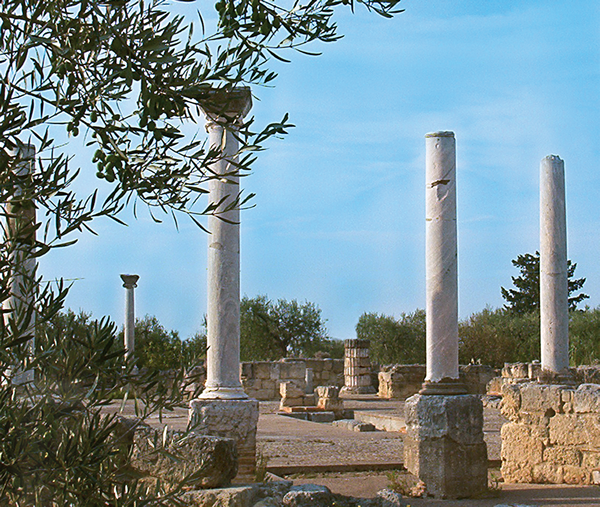
Remains of the San Leucio Basilica

The Basilica of San Leucio is one of the greatest examples of early Christian architecture in Apulia. A pagan temple until the 2nd century AD, probably dedicated to Minerva, was transformed into a Christian Basilica between the 4th and 5th centuries AD. The structure is the result of merging the cultures of Magna Graecia and Italica consisting of a cell dedicated to worship located between two large rooms, with polychrome mosaics, tufa plastered figured capitals and painted columns in Doric – Ionic. The early Christian Basilica of San Leucio was built on a Hellenistic temple. Its construction reused the already existing walls, columns and capitals. The floor plan is called a double envelope consists of an outer wall of square shape of 50 metres (160 ft) per side with exedra on each side within which there is a second concentric squares with colonnade exedras. The architecture of the basilica is of oriental inspiration, with preference for large color spaces. In the 9th century a chapel was built adjoining the apse for burial rites.

===== Basilica di San Pietro =====
The Basilica di San Pietro was the first cathedral of the Christian era, then transformed into a tomb of Saint Sabino (556), patron of Canosa. The complex is with three naves, apse and narthex of St. Peter's, preceded by a large atrium portico and bordered by a residential building and several other structures used in cemetery functions: a mausoleum, the Sepulchre of Bishop Sabino, a large brick kiln devoted to cooking and a domus, used probably as a bishop's residence. Also present are mosaics and Doric-Ionic capitals. Since 2001 the entire area is ongoing systematic excavation by the University of Foggia and the University of Bari.

===== Baptistry of San Giovanni =====
The main body of the twelve-sided shape, contained a heptagonal baptismal font. The compositions were mainly in marble and tuff. The columns that support the barrel vault was damaged over time, as they have lost the gold mosaics that once covered it. Corresponding to the cardinal points, left four small dodecagon aisles to form a structure of a Greek cross. In the 1800s, it was used as a mill. Nevertheless, such use did not affect the status of the building. Since 2001 it is the subject of research by the University of Foggia. Recently, under the Baptistry, have yielded two distinct levels of an early Christian church.

===== Temple of Jupiter "Toro" =====
The Roman temple of Jupiter "Toro", a peripteral temple with six columns on the short sides and ten on the long sides, and a brick staircase, took its name from a statue of Jupiter found at the excavation in 1978.

===== Other sites =====
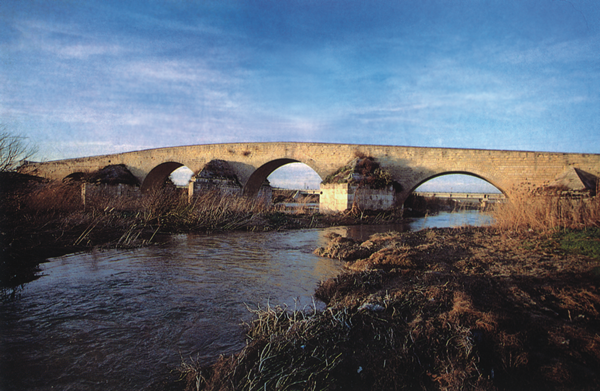
Roman bridge over the Ofanto river

Among other monuments are the Ofanto Roman Bridge (1st century AD), which allowed the passage of the Via Traiana from one side of the river and was used for road traffic until the 1970s. It was reconstructed in the Middle Ages and restored again in 1759. The base consists of four pillars shaped like a spearhead and five mixed arches. Notable are the Tower and Mausoleums, Casieri Bagnoli and Barbarossa, and the Arch of Gaius Terentius Varro, opus latericium and the opus reticulatum monuments dedicated to the passage of the Roman consul in the Battle of Cannae. The first three sites preserve the remains of some of the fallen in the battle. Finally, the Roman Baths (Ferrara and Lomuscio) located in the city center came to light in the 1950s. They have enriched apse mosaics.

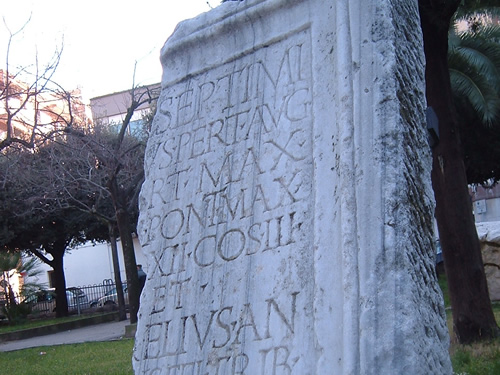
Roman inscription in the lapidarium.

== Languages ==
The dialect is a primary Italo-Romance dialect arising directly from the Vulgar Latin spoken in ancient Canusium. Linguistically, part of the southern dialects spoken in North Central Apulia. The vocabulary is almost entirely of Latin origin with influences of ancient Greek. Norman domination has left some words, without upsetting the existing lexical and grammatical system.

== Culture ==
=== Education ===
Canosa is home to four secondary schools:

- State Professional Institute for Agriculture and the Environment "May 1".
- Nicola Garrone State Professional Institute for Trade.
- Luigi Einaudi Istituto Tecnico Commerciale Statale
- Enrico Fermi Liceo Scientifico Statale

=== Museums ===
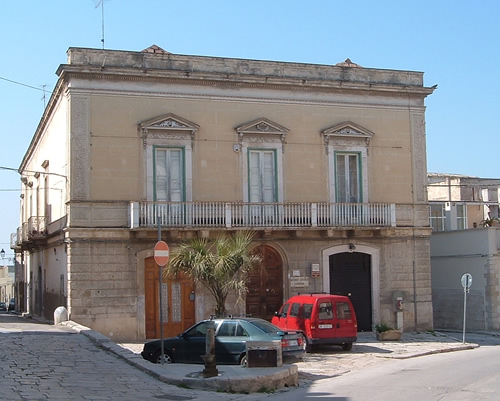
The Museo Civico Archeologico

==== Museo Civico Archeologico ====
The Archaeological Museum was established in 1934 and placed in the 18th-century Casieri palace. It houses about 2,000 archaeological finds from excavations in tombs at Canosa and the 5th-3rd centuries BC. There are inscriptions, sculptures, reliefs, marbles, coins, jewelry, ceramics and pottery dating back to a broad span of about 1500 years representing the ancient Dauno, Roman, early Christian and medieval Byzantine. In the past, the museum has been deprived of some pieces of inestimable value, such as gold from the Tomb of the Ori. These jewels are now held at the National Archaeological Museum of Taranto, and scattered in major Italian and European museums (including the Louvre Museum in Paris). The museum collection includes:

- Pieces of red-figure pottery and amphorae.
- Cruet, pitchers, bowls, jars, amphoras, urns, small vases in the 3rd century BC
- Jewish, Roman and Christian lamps. There are also a clay statue of a woman in prayer and some lead of the aqueduct of Herodes Atticus
- Coinage of Canusium.
- Askos and lekanoi polychrome Iapyges inscriptions,
- Fragments of medieval pottery and Neolithic flints.

==== Palazzo Sinesi - Archaeological Foundation Canosina ====
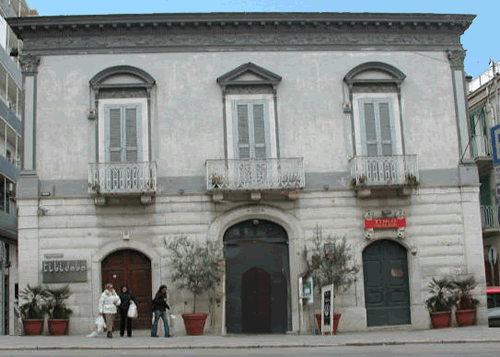
Palazzo Sinesi

Palazzo Sines (19th century), has since 1994 been an exhibition space for thematic exhibitions. It is the seat of the Archaeological Foundation Canosina and home to the Superintendent of Archaeological Heritage of Apulia.

==== Palazzo Iliceto ====
Palazzo Iliceto is an imposing 18th-century building intended as an exhibition space for special exhibits. Until 2005 it was the home of the Museo delle Marionette Canosa, and since 2005 houses the archaeological exhibition God with lightning. It was also used for some theater in the summer of 2003, and outdoor film screenings in the summers of 2004 and 2005. Exhibitions include:

- God with lightning (from 18 May 2005): This is an archaeological exhibition that has images sacred to Canusium, sponsored by the Foundation Archaeological Canosina.
- The Museum of Puppets (the valuable and interesting collection of Aquila-Taccardi: an assortment of 52 large characters in beech, walnut and pine, antique silk robes, armor, copper and nickel silver represented noble Spanish Christians, princesses and Saracens, popes, dukes and cardinals.
- The days of the sacred (2003) show the traditions of Holy Week and in Canosa di Puglia.

==== Museum of Country Life ====
The Museum of Country Life is housed in an old bakery in the service area of the castle and is sporadically open during the summer, the patron festivals, and at events organized in the castle. The museum, through an extensive development of original objects, traces the daily rural life in the last century, browsing habits and customs of a civilization now vanished. The museum is divided into three macro-areas:

- Domestic life: pots, kettles, wooden spoons, faggots to feed the flame and other tools for preparation of food farmers. Also furniture, a stroller, representations of deities placed on the facades of houses.
- Agriculture: pruning scissors, blankets, bags, straining vats, crusher, press and barrels of various sizes, plows, hoes, harrows, and agrarian civilization objects linked to production and consumption of extra virgin olive oil, wine and wheat.
- The craft: the tools of the blacksmith, the tinsmith, shoemaker, plus all the necessary trades related to the processing of clay, hides, the production of cheeses and dairy products.

=== Food and wine ===
The 'Canosina' gastronomy is strongly linked to rural and Mediterraneans culinary traditions. One of the most characteristic is the burned flour of wheat (in the Apulian dialect gren IARS): A dark meal of humble origins, obtained from the grain recovered from the burning of stubble after harvest, from which it was produced the characteristic dark color meal. This recovery was done by people who could not afford the "normal" flour. The most original and popular products that are obtained by mixing equal parts white flour and wheat flour are burned dragged (in dialect strasc-net) with prosciutto and bread (in dialect ppen to prusutt) to make a dark bread mixed with white. Distinguishing gastronomy features of the city are the renowned extra virgin olive oil obtained from Corato olives. Rosso Canosa Wine, produced with Uva di Troia (grapes of Troy, also called a variety of Canosa). Wine production also includes white and red wines, as well as excellent sparkling wines. The main products under the brand IGT (Typical Geographic Indication) are: Nero di Troia, Trebbiano, Cabernet Sauvignon, Puglia Rosso, Sangiovese.

==== Rosso Canosa DOC ====
The Italian wine DOC of Rosso Canosa is designated only for red wine production with the 100 ha (250 acre) zone. Grapes are limited to a harvest yield of 14 tonnes/ha with the finished wine needing at least 12% alcohol. The wine are a blend of 65% Uva di Troia, up to 35% blend of Montepulciano and Sangiovese with Sangiovese, itself, not to exceed 15%, and other local red grape varieties allowed up to 5%. If the wine is labeled Riserva then it must be aged for a minimum of 2 years with at least one of those years spent in oak barrels/wood. Riserva wine must also have a higher minimum alcohol level of 13%.

== Markets ==
The food market (also known as the square) takes place daily in the Piazza Galuppi, currently in the recovery phase, while the traditional weekly market is held every Thursday (with some exceptions) in the St. Johns (known as field-field).

== People ==
- Paulina Busa (fl. 216 BC), a merciful noblewoman during the Second Punic War.
- Sabinus of Canosa (461–566), bishop and patron saint of Canosa.
- Bohemond I of Antioch or Altavilla (1050?–1111), Prince of Taranto, commander of the First Crusade and buried at Canosa.
- Archbishop Francesco Minerva, archbishop (1904–2004), archpriest of the cathedral parish priest of San Sabino, later Bishop of the Diocese of Nardo-Gallipoli and finally archbishop of Lecce.
- Enzo de Muro Lomanto (1902–52), tenor of international fame, married to the soprano Toti Dal Monte
- Lino Banfi (1936), actor
- Gaetano Castrovilli (1997), professional football player

== Events ==
=== February ===
- Death of San Sabino (February 9) – Liturgy, a procession and fireworks.
- Our Lady of Lourdes (February 11)
- Canosa carnival

=== March ===
- Our Lady of Constantinople (1 st Tuesday of the month) – Pilgrimage to the Shrine of Our Lady of Constantinople, according to a custom dating from the 8th century.
- Via Crucis evocation of the 14 Stations of the Cross, organized by the Santa Teresa Parish.

=== April ===
- Procession of the Addolorata (Friday before Palm Sunday) - is the procession that begins the rites of Holy Week. The procession includes the participation of a very large number of faithful, mostly women dressed and veiled in black, often barefoot. Tradition recalls that the Virgin Mary, in search of her son Jesus, knocked (hence tupp-tuzz'le, i.e. knock) at church doors before reaching the cathedral.
- The Tomb (Rite of Holy Week,
- Procession of the Mysteries (Rite of Holy Week, Good Friday)
- Procession of Distressed (Rite of Holy Week, Holy Saturday) - Probably the most impressive procession of Holy Week. It starts from the Church of San Francesco and San Biagio on Saturday morning. Children dressed as angels open the procession showing the subjects and sentences the Passion of Christ. Below the Distressed statue followed by a large choir of some 250 girls with their faces covered and dressed in black, some still barefoot, screaming (in harrowing ways) a typical song, the Stabat Mater.
- Procession of Our Lady of the Fountain - the rediscovery of the traditional Feast of First Fruits, on the second Sunday of Easter. Canosini producers lead the ancient icon, preserved in the cathedral by nine centuries

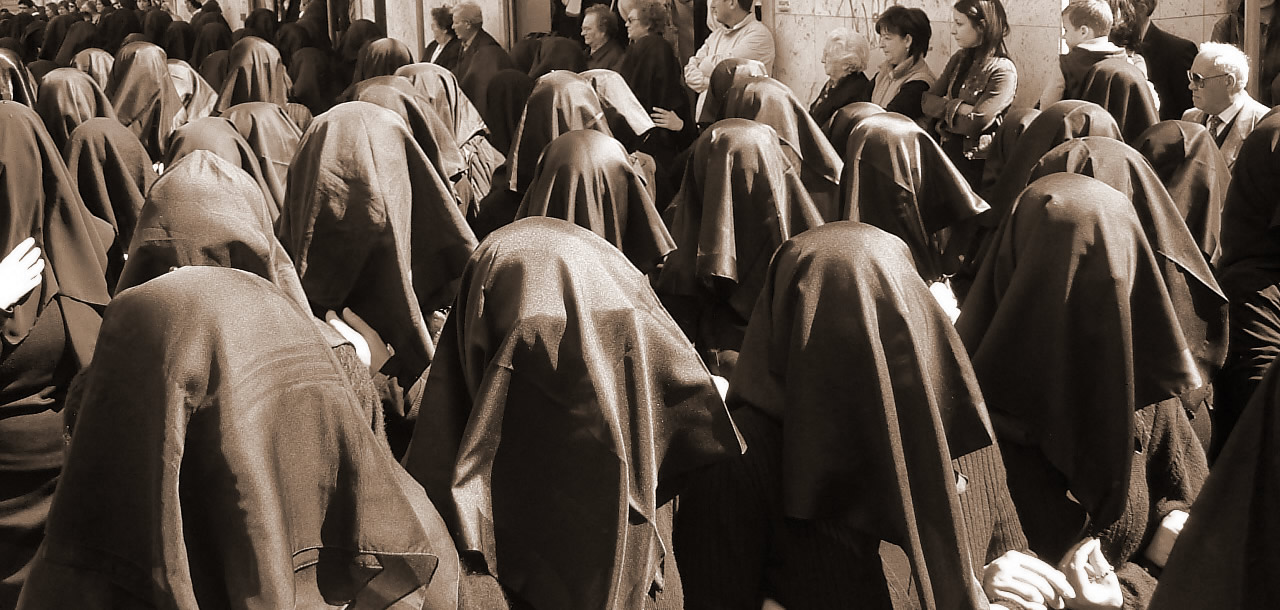
Women sing the Stabat Mater during the procession of the distressed

=== May ===
- Week of Cultural Heritage
- Citizen Fair (20 and May 21)

=== June ===
- St Maria Altomare (June 1) - local parties organized by the parish of Jesus, Mary and Joseph.

=== July ===
- Diomede Award - Apulia rewards distinguished Canosa for meritorious work in economic, sporting, social, scientific, artistic and cultural efforts.
- Our Lady of Mount Carmel (July 16) - neighborhood festivals organized by the rector of Mount Carmel.
- "Canosa Summer" (July 31) - Musical entertainment

=== August ===
- Festival of San Sabino, Madonna della Fonte and St. Alphonsus Maria de Liguori (August 1, 2)
- Sagra dell Old Red Wine (1st week of month)
- Rite of Percocca (2nd Sunday of month)
- Feast of the Assumption (August 15)

=== October ===
- Santa Teresa (October 1)
- Our Lady of the Rosary (October 7)

=== November ===
- St. Catherine of Alexandria Martyr (November 25)

=== December ===
- Sagra dell Extra Virgin Olive Oil
- St. Immaculate (December 8) - local parties organized by the parish of St. Immaculate.
- Saint Lucia (December 13)
- Living Nativity - Representation with 150 figures that extends over an area of 6000 m 2 and a path along 300 m. The first edition was published in 2004. It is estimated about 40,000 visitors a year come witness it.
- Christmas in the City - White Night
- Exhibition of Nativity crafts, organized by the local branch of the Italian Association of Friends of the Natvity

== Economy ==
The Canosina economy is mainly linked to agriculture. The historic resources, archaeological and tourist, facilitate the influx of visitors. The city's central position in relation to the surrounding area, however, helped give rise to particular firms in the textile and food industries.

=== Agriculture ===
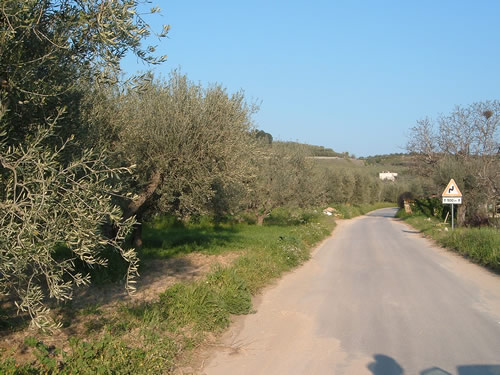
A Canosa Olive Grove

The location puts the area between the Canosa Murgia and Tavoliere delle Puglie, a few miles of Lake Locone. Due to the mild temperatures, typical of the area are the production of figs, prickly pears, almonds, lampascioni, peaches and cherries, without neglecting other vegetables (turnips, beets and Arugula), and vegetables. Recently (2005) there have been controversies and protests by farmers due to low scores on local products, which have followed the movement disruption and confrontation with the recording of incidents of crime. Farms surrounding cattle, sheep and goats guarantees the production of milk and cheese for the surroundings dairy industries.

=== Handicrafts ===
The realization of handmade wicker baskets or clay pots are still frequent. Still practiced is the ancient crafts such as shoemaking.

=== Industry ===
The rolas a strategic road junction has allowed the city to host a number of distribution centers for goods, such as fruits and medicines. In recent decades, Canosa has developed several wineries and olive oil center, along with a major pasta factory. Since the early 2000s a planned incinerator in the territory of Canosa has led to many demonstrations and protests. After a long and complicated litigation between the municipal administration and the manufacturers of the plant, in March 2007 a decision of the Council of State overturned the building permit for the construction.

== Transportation ==
=== Roads and highways ===
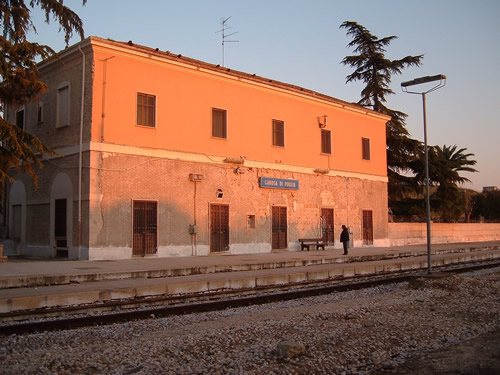
Canosa Railway Station

Canosa is located near one of the most important motorway hubs of southern Italy. From 1973, the Motorway A16 (Naples-Canosa, also known as Two Seas Highway) intersects Motorway A14 (Bologna – Taranto, also called the Adriatic highway). The toll of Canosa is 172 km from Naples, 611 km from Bologna and 133 km from Taranto. At average of 15 - 20 thousand cars, with peaks of 40 - 45 thousand units, and the toll road of Canosa will be extended. In the northeast the modern Provincial Road 231 Andries Coratina (SS 98) parallels the Via Traiana built by Emperor Trajan in 108 AD, linking the ancient Trajan Benevento to Brindisi. In Roman times there was probably a port for shipment of goods, which still is an all-important reference port located at Barletta. Other roads of major importance are the Provincial Road 231 Andries Coratina (SS 98) and State Road 93 Appulo Lucana Barletta-Canosa.

=== Railways ===
Canosa has a railway station, currently on the Barletta-Spinazzola line. The project dates back to 1861, but in 1888 is entered into an agreement with Southern Railways Company for the construction of the line. The railway line was inaugurated on August 1, 1895. Since the nineties the line was strongly curtailed.

== Twin towns ==
Canosa is twinned with:

- Grójec, Poland
- Dubrovnik, Croatia
- Grinzane Cavour, Italy
- Torremaggiore, Italy

== Sports ==
The soccer team of the city is the SS Canosa. The company's corporate colors are red and blue. Currently playing in the Promotion cup, but in the past has played in the Cup of Excellence and the Championship Series D. It also won the Amateur Cup of Italy. Among the sports facilities in the city include:

- Municipal Stadium Sabino Moroccan
- Stadio Comunale San Sabino
- Sports Palace

== Sources ==
- Baynes, T. S., ed. (1878), "Canosa" , Encyclopædia Britannica, vol. 5 (9th ed.), New York: Charles Scribner's Sons, pp. 23–24
- Ashby, Thomas (1911), "Canosa" , in Chisholm, Hugh (ed.), Encyclopædia Britannica, vol. 5 (11th ed.), Cambridge University Press, pp. 203–204
- Ashby, Thomas (1911), "Canusium" , in Chisholm, Hugh (ed.), Encyclopædia Britannica, vol. 5 (11th ed.), Cambridge University Press, p. 221
