= Francesco Minerva =

- Archbishop of Lecce
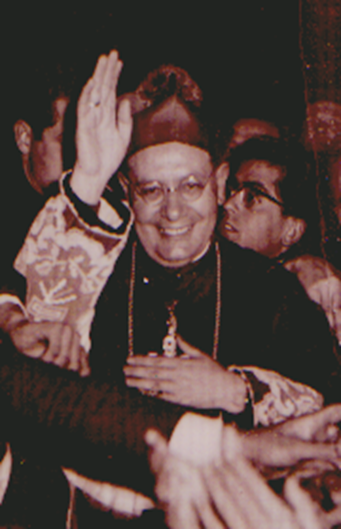
- Church: Catholic Church
- Archdiocese: Archdiocese of Lecce
- In office: 17 December 1950 – 27 January 1981
- Predecessor: Alberto Costa
- Successor: Michele Mincuzzi
- Previous posts: Apostolic Administrator of Nardò (1950-1951); Apostolic Administrator of Lecce (1950); Bishop of Nardò (1948-1950)

Orders
- Ordination: 16 April 1927 by Nicola Giannattasio
- Consecration: 31 October 1948 by Ferdinando Bernardi

Personal details
- Born: 31 January 1904 Canosa di Puglia, Province of Bari, Kingdom of Italy
- Died: 23 August 2004 (aged 100) Canosa di Puglia, Apulia, Italy

Francesco Minerva (31 January 1904 – 23 August 2004) was an Italian Roman Catholic prelate; at his death he was the second-oldest living bishop in the Roman Catholic Church, after Corrado Bafile. He was also one of its longest-serving priests, having been ordained on 16 April 1927.

== Biography ==
Minerva was born at Canosa di Puglia. He graduated in theology at the Pontifical Lateran University and, later, in law at the University of Bari. Pope Pius XII named Minerva bishop of Nardò in 1948 and in 1950 transferred him to the somewhat larger diocese of Lecce. While his successor in Nardò, Corrado Ursi, went on to become Archbishop of Naples and a Cardinal, Minerva continued in Lecce, which was elevated to an archdiocese in 1980, and retired in 1981.

He died at Canosa di Puglia in 2004. He is buried in the Cathedral of San Sabino in that city.
