= Locone =

Location
- Country: Italy

Physical characteristics
- Source
  - location: near Spinazzola
- Mouth: Ofanto
  - coordinates: 41.1924°N 15.9817°E
- Length: 33 km (21 mi)

Basin features
- Progression: Ofanto→ Adriatic Sea

The Locone, before entering the reservoir of the same name in the territory of Minervino Murge.

The Locone is a river in the Apulia and Basilicata regions of southern Italy. The source of the river is near Spinazzola in the province of Barletta-Andria-Trani. From there, the river flows north and forms the border between the province of Barletta-Andria-Trani and the province of Potenza for a short distance. The river re-enters the province of Barletta-Andria-Trani and is joined by a left tributary flowing from the province of Potenza before entering the Ofanto south of Cerignola as a right tributary of the river.

== See also ==
- Lago Locone
- Loconia
