= Loconia =

- Frazione
- Location of Loconia in Italy
- Coordinates: 41°09′33.8″N 15°56′19.0″E
- Country: Italy
- Region: Apulia
- Province: Barletta-Andria-Trani (BT)
- Comune: Canosa di Puglia
- Elevation: 120 m (390 ft)

Population (2009)
  - Total: 82
- Demonym: Loconiani
- Time zone: UTC+1 (CET)
  - Summer (DST): UTC+2 (CEST)
- Postal code: 76012
- Dialing code: (+39) 0883
- Patron saint: St. Anthony of Padua

Loconia is a southern Italian village and the only hamlet (frazione) of Canosa di Puglia, a municipality in the province of Barletta-Andria-Trani, Apulia. As of 2009 its population was of 82.

== History ==
The village is a rural planned community, realized during Fascism in early 1930s, and named after the river Locone.

== Geography ==
Loconia lies near the rivers Ofanto and Locone, nearby the borders of Apulia with Basilicata. It is crossed by the national highway SS93 and is 14 km far from Canosa, 17 from Minervino Murge, 18 from Cerignola, and 18 from Lavello. Around the village there are some rural localities (Cefalicchio, Crocifisso, Galere, Posta Piana, Socialisti), named after some ancient farmhouses (masserie).

== Events ==
- Patronal feast of St. Anthony of Padua, in the second sunday of August.
- Sagra of Percoca Peach, in the second saturday of August.

== See also ==
- Locone Lake
