= Lucania (disambiguation) =

Lucania was an ancient area of southern Italy.

Lucania may also refer to:

== Places ==
- Lucania et Bruttium, a province of the Roman Empire in southern Italy
- Lucania (theme), a Byzantine province in southern Italy
- Basilicata, a modern region in southern Italy sometimes known as Lucania
- Mount Lucania, Yukon, Canada

== People ==
- Salvatore Lucania (1897–1962), known as Lucky Luciano, Italian-American mobster

== Transport ==
- RMS Lucania, a British ocean liner operated 1893–1909
- SS Lucania, an Italian passenger ship that served as HMCS Prince Robert during World War II
- British Rail Class 40, a type of British railway diesel electric locomotive

== Other uses ==
- Lucania (film), a 2019 film by Gigi Roccati
- Lucania (fish), a genus of freshwater fish in the family Fundulidae
- Winnipeg Lucania FC, a Canadian amateur soccer club
