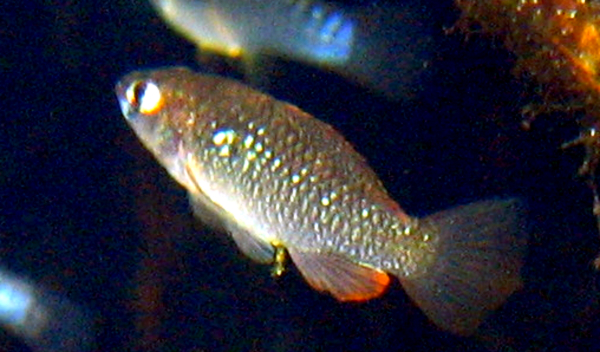

Conservation status
- Least Concern (IUCN 3.1)

Scientific classification
- Kingdom: Animalia
- Phylum: Chordata
- Class: Actinopterygii
- Order: Cyprinodontiformes
- Family: Fundulidae
- Genus: Lucania
- Species: L. parva

Binomial name
- Lucania parva (S. F. Baird & Girard, 1855)

Synonyms
- Cyprinodon parvus Baird & Girard, 1855; Limia venusta Girard, 1858; Lucania affinis Girard, 1859

= Rainwater killifish =

Species of fish

The rainwater killifish (Lucania parva) is a small silvery fish with yellow flashes and diamond shaped scales that is widespread from Cape Cod, Massachusetts, through to Tampico, Mexico, with occurrences reported on the Yucatán peninsula. It is commonly found in large numbers in fresh to brackish estuarine environments, and inland in parts of New Mexico, Texas and Mexico. It feeds on various aquatic invertebrates. It can reach up to 7 centimetres (2.8 in) total length.

== Species description and etymology ==
The rainwater killifish was formally described by Spencer Fullerton Baird and Charles Frédéric Girard as Cyprinodon parvus with the type locality given as Beesley's Point, New Jersey and as Greenport, Long Island, New York. The name of the genus, Lucania, is a Native American word from an unknown language and of unknown meaning which presumably Girard liked the sound of. Girard named this species as the type species of the genus Lucania in 1859 but using the junior synonym Limia venusta. The specific name is Latin for "small".

== See also ==
- Killifish (general)
