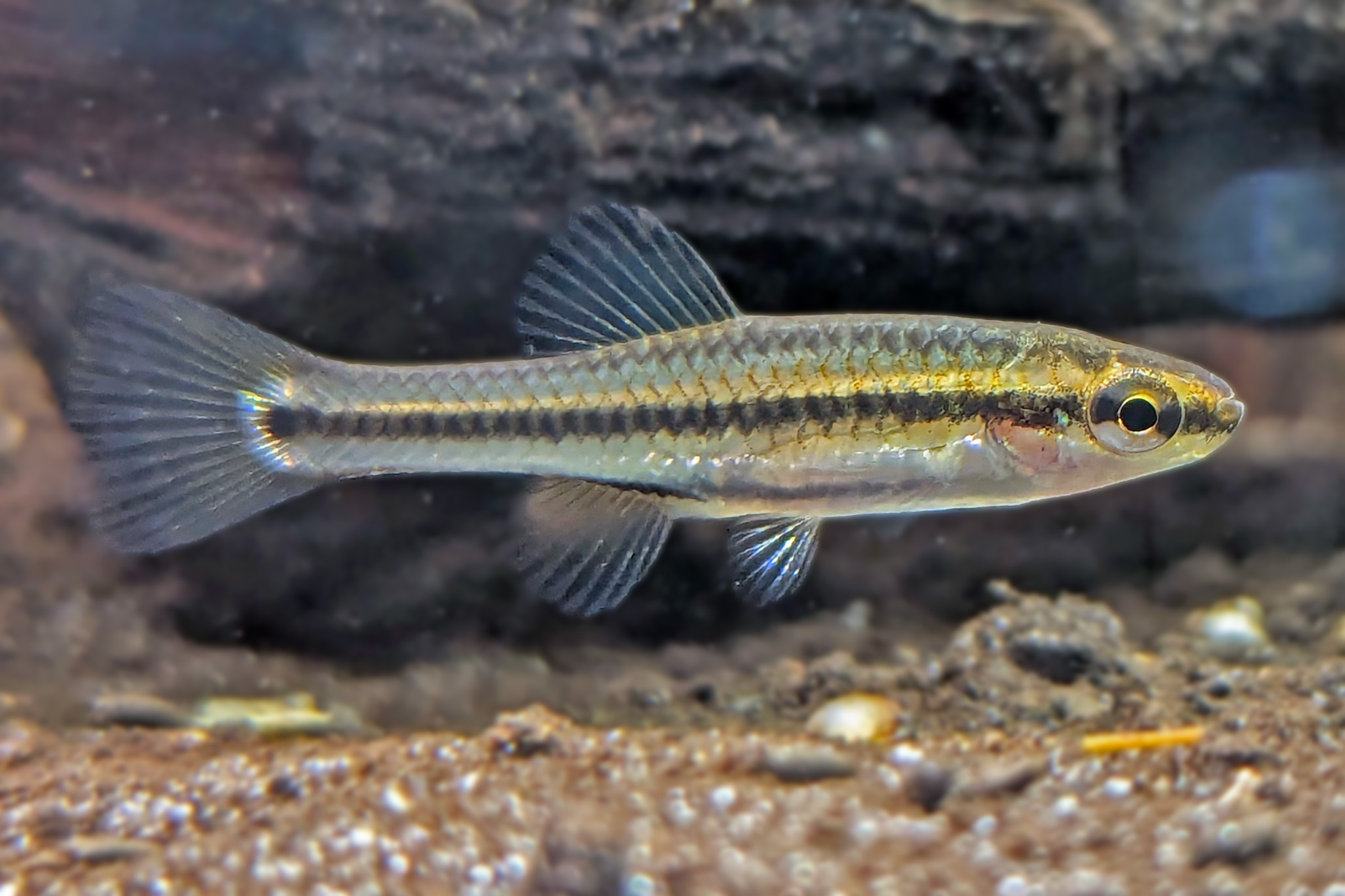
- Female
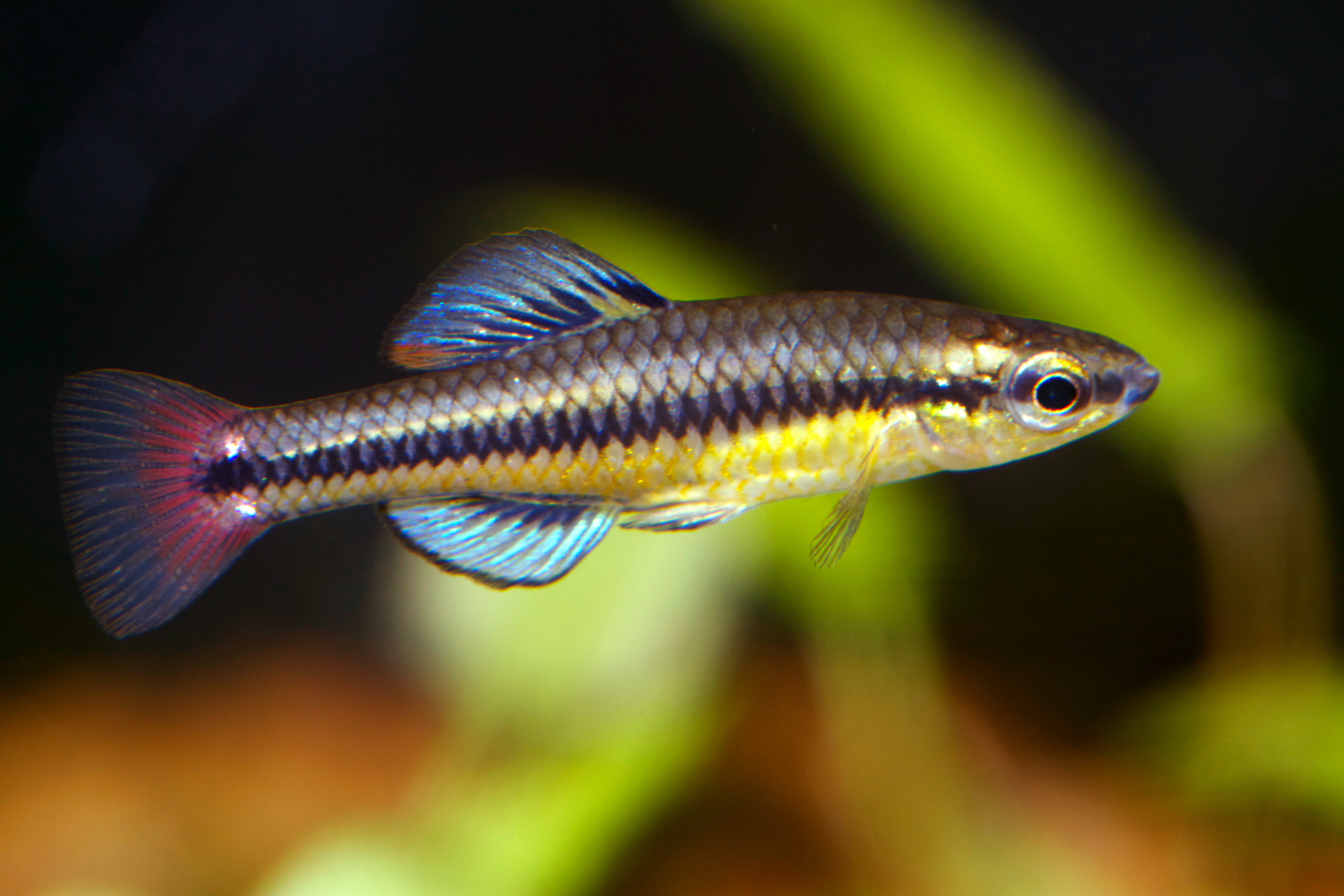
- Male

Conservation status
- Least Concern (IUCN 3.1)

Scientific classification
- Kingdom: Animalia
- Phylum: Chordata
- Class: Actinopterygii
- Order: Cyprinodontiformes
- Family: Fundulidae
- Genus: Lucania
- Species: L. goodei

Binomial name
- Lucania goodei Jordan, 1880

= Lucania goodei =

Species of fish

Lucania goodei, the bluefin killifish, is a small species of fish in the topminnow family Fundulidae. It is native to the southeastern United States, but has been introduced to California, Texas and North Carolina. Other common names for the fish include Florida blue dace.

== Distribution ==
The bluefin killifish is found throughout Florida, except for its panhandle, where it is not found west of the Choctawhatchee River. It is found in the Chipola River drainage of southeastern Alabama, and sporadically along the Atlantic coast up to central South Carolina. It has been introduced to Texas, North Carolina, and California.

== Description ==
Normally, the bluefin killifish can grow up to 2.9 cm (1.1 in), but the maximum length recorded is 6 cm (2.4 in). The maximum recorded age of the bluefin killifish is 2 years.

== Ecology ==
Lucania goodei lives in heavily vegetated ponds and streams with little to no current. It is often found in spring habitats, and can also survive in moderate salinity, as well as low oxygen environments where it uses its upturned mouth to gulp air at the surface. Otherwise, it swims well below the surface. It is not a seasonal fish, unlike some other killifish. To distinguish between a male and female, look for an orange tint on the fins, as males have an orange tint to them, while females’ fins are colorless.

The females are the ones carrying the eggs, and although they can breed year-round, peak breeding occurs from spring to summer.

== Species naming ==
Lucania goodei was described by David Starr Jordan in 1880 with the type locality given as the Arlington River a tributary of St. John's River in Florida. The specific name honors the American ichthyologist George Brown Goode (1851–1896) who was the collector of the type.

== See also ==
- George Brown Goode
