= Thiallela epicrociella =

Scientific classification
- Domain: Eukaryota
- Kingdom: Animalia
- Phylum: Arthropoda
- Class: Insecta
- Order: Lepidoptera
- Family: Pyralidae
- Genus: Thiallela
- Species: T. epicrociella

Binomial name
- Thiallela epicrociella (Strand, 1919)

Synonyms
- Phycita epicrociella Strand, 1918; Acrobasis epicrociella

Species of moth

Thiallela epicrociella is a species of moth of the family Pyralidae described by Embrik Strand in 1919. It is found in Taiwan.
