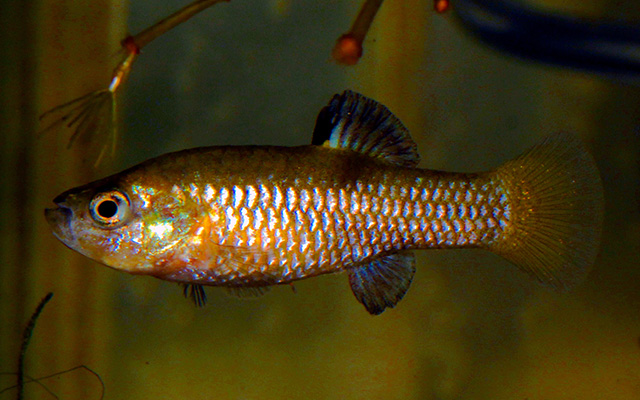
- male
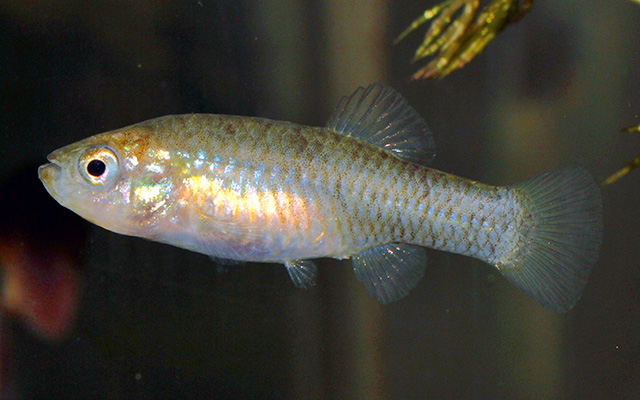
- female

Conservation status
- Endangered (IUCN 3.1)

Scientific classification
- Kingdom: Animalia
- Phylum: Chordata
- Class: Actinopterygii
- Order: Cyprinodontiformes
- Family: Fundulidae
- Genus: Lucania
- Species: L. interioris

Binomial name
- Lucania interioris C. L. Hubbs & R. R. Miller, 1965

= Cuatrocienegas killifish =

Species of fish

The Cuatro Ciénegas killifish (Lucania interioris; also known locally as the sardinilla de Cuatro Ciénegas) is an endangered species of fish in the family Cyprinodontidae. It is endemic to Cuatro Ciénegas in Mexico, where it exists in severely fragmented habitats within the valley.
