= Thiallela ligeralis =

Scientific classification
- Kingdom: Animalia
- Phylum: Arthropoda
- Class: Insecta
- Order: Lepidoptera
- Family: Pyralidae
- Genus: Thiallela
- Species: T. ligeralis

Binomial name
- Thiallela ligeralis Walker, 1863

Synonyms
- Luconia pallidobasella Ragonot, 1888

Species of moth

Thiallela ligeralis is a species of moth of the family Pyralidae. It is found in Sri Lanka, Pakistan, India and other oriental regions.

Larval food plants include Manilkara zapota and Pyrus communis.
