= Thiallela =

Scientific classification
- Kingdom: Animalia
- Phylum: Arthropoda
- Class: Insecta
- Order: Lepidoptera
- Family: Pyralidae
- Subfamily: Phycitinae
- Genus: Thiallela; Walker, 1863

Type species
- Thiallela signifera Walker, 1863

Synonyms
- Luconia Ragonot, 1888; Phalobathra Meyrick, 1932

Genus of moths

Thiallela is a genus of snout moths. It was described by Francis Walker in 1863.

== Distribution ==
The genus is distributed in the Oriental and Australian regions, including China, Japan, India, Sri Lanka, Myanmar, Malaysia, Indonesia, New Guinea, Australia and Fiji.

== Species ==
- Thiallela dolokensis Roesler & Küppers, 1981
- Thiallela eduardi Roesler & Küppers, 1981
- Thiallela endochralis Hampson, 1908
- Thiallela epicrociella (Strand, 1919)
- Thiallela escigera (Meyrick, 1932)
- Thiallela hiranoi Yamanaka, 2002
- Thiallela ligeralis (Walker, 1863) (=Luconia pallidobasella Ragonot, 1888)
- Thiallela naevilla H.H. Li & Y.D. Ren, 2006
- Thiallela platantra H.H. Li & Y.D. Ren, 2006
- Thiallela rhodoptila Meyrick, 1932
- Thiallela signifera Walker, 1863
