= Locone reservoir =

Lake in Italy

Locone Lake
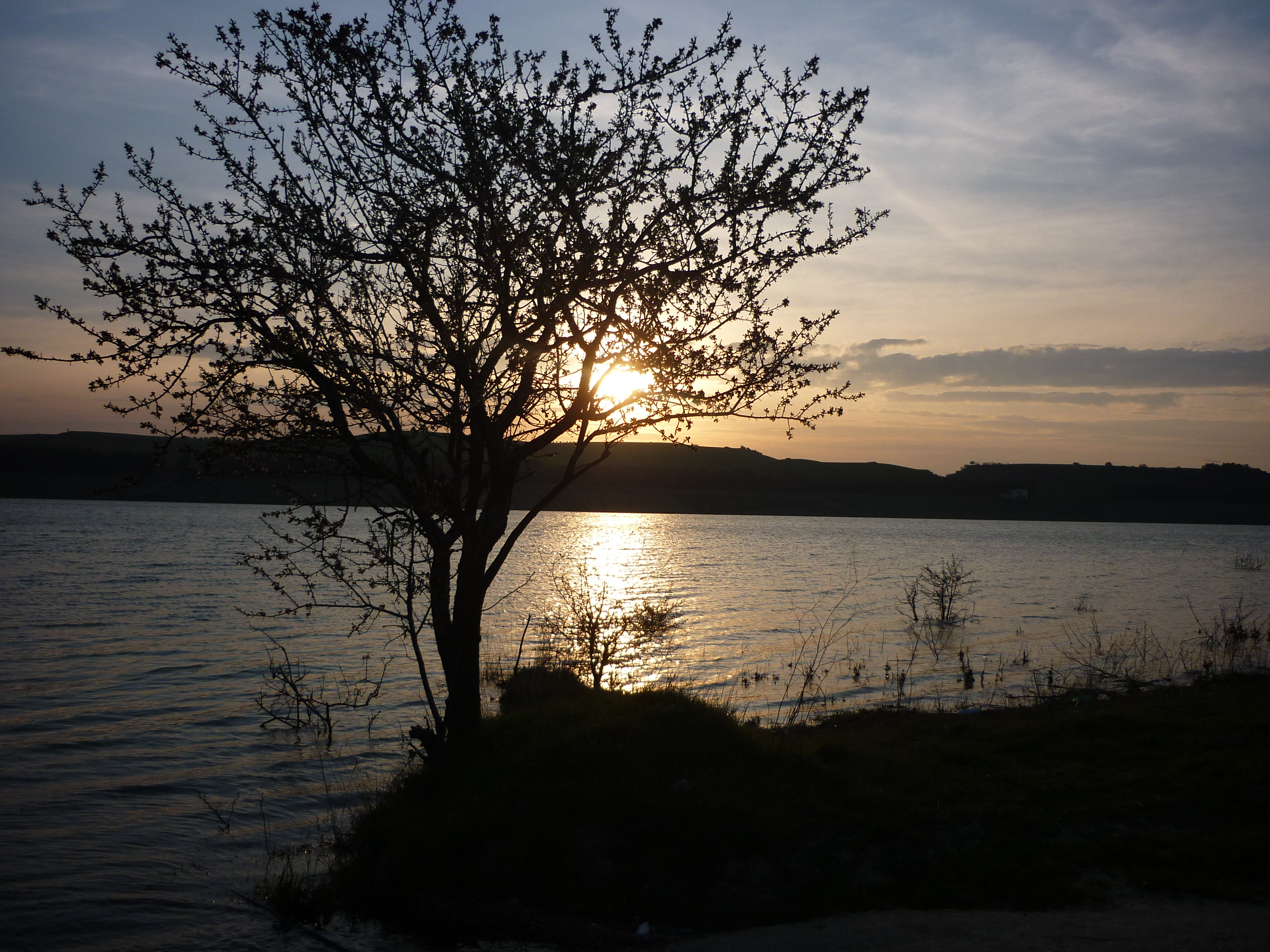

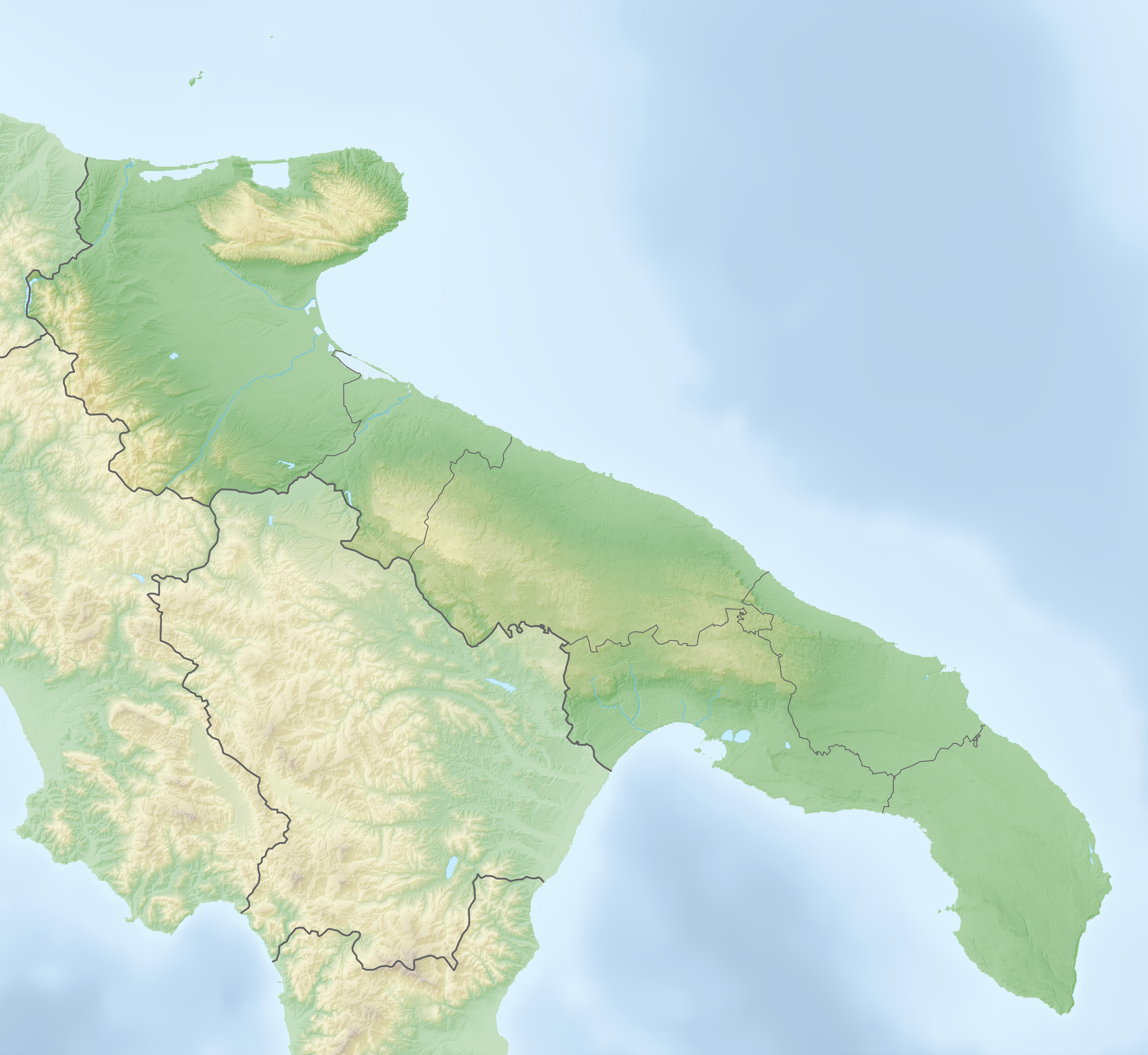
- Location within Apulia
- Location: Province of Barletta-Andria-Trani, Apulia
- Coordinates: 41°05′06″N 16°00′00″E
- Primary inflows: Torrente Locone
- Basin countries: Italy
- Surface area: 4.87 km^{2} (1.88 sq mi)
- Surface elevation: 186.62 m (612.3 ft)

Locone reservoir or Locone Lake is an artificial reservoir in the Province of Barletta-Andria-Trani, Apulia, Italy, near Minervino Murge. At an elevation of 186.62 m (612.3 ft), its surface area is 4.87 km^{2} (1.88 sq mi). It is used as a source of irrigation water in Apulia.

== See also ==
- Locone
- Loconia
