= L.A.con =

L.A.con is the name given to four of the six Worldcons held in or near Los Angeles, California. All four were held in Anaheim.

- L.A.con I, 1972
- L.A.con II, 1984
- L.A.con III, 1996
- L.A.con IV, 2006
- L.A.con V, 2026

(The other two were Pacificon I, in 1946, and Solacon in 1958.)
