= Lacona, Capoliveri =

Lacona
- Frazione
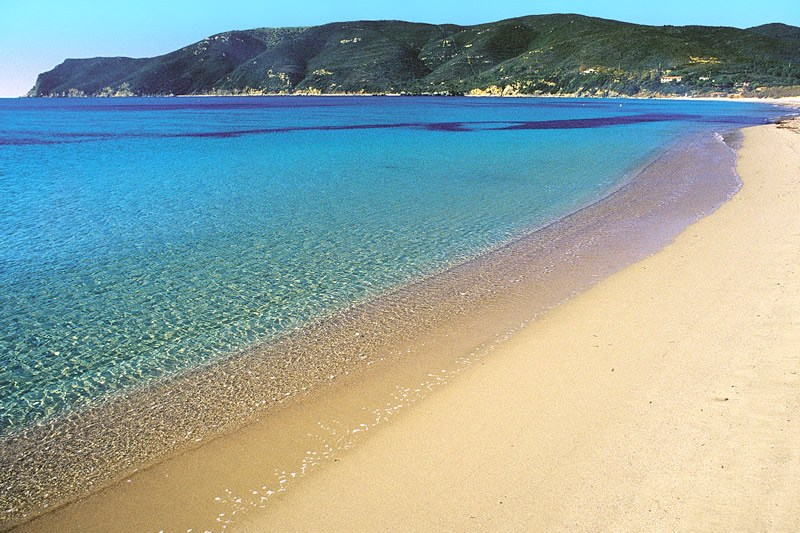

- Location of Lacona in Italy
- Coordinates: 42°45′33″N 10°18′42″E
- Country: Italy
- Region: Tuscany
- Province: Livorno (LI)
- Comune: Capoliveri
- Elevation: 5 m (16 ft)

Population (2011)
  - Total: 303
- Time zone: UTC+1 (CET)
  - Summer (DST): UTC+2 (CEST)
- Postal code: 57031
- Dialing code: (+39) 0565

Lacona is a village in Tuscany, central Italy, administratively a frazione of the comune of Capoliveri, province of Livorno. At the time of the 2011 census its population was 303.

Lacona is located on the Elba Island and it is about 10 km from Capoliveri.

== Bibliography ==
- Zecchini, Michelangelo (2001). Isola d'Elba. Le origini. Lucca.
