= Ofanto =

River in Italy

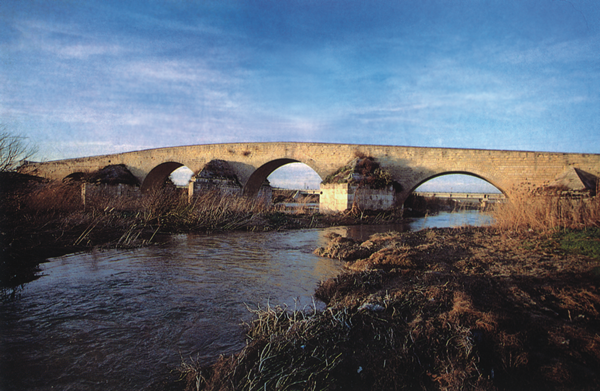

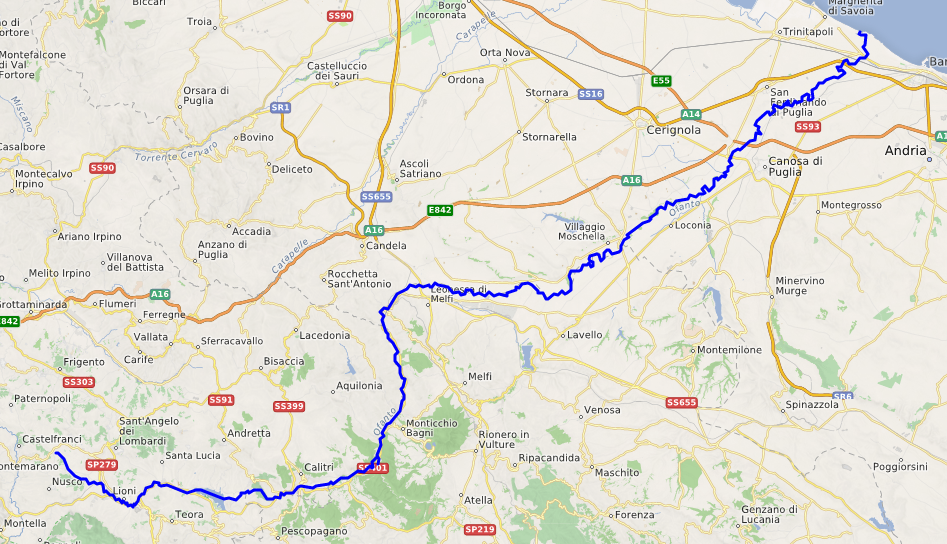

Location
- Country: Italy

Physical characteristics
- Source
  - location: near Nusco
  - elevation: 715 m (2,346 ft)
- Mouth: Adriatic Sea
  - location: Gulf of Manfredonia
  - coordinates: 41.3592°N 16.1976°E
  - elevation: 0 m (0 ft)
- Length: 134 km (83 mi); 170 km (110 mi)
- Basin size: 2,780 km^{2} (1,070 mi^{2})
- Discharge
  - average: 15 cubic metres per second (530 cu ft/s)

The Ofanto (Italian pronunciation: [ˈɔːfanto]), known in ancient times as Aufidus or Canna, is a 134 or 170 km (83 or 106 mi) (depending on the sources) river in southern Italy that flows through the regions of Campania, Basilicata, and Apulia, into the Gulf of Manfredonia near Barletta.

== Geography ==
The river's source is on the Irpinia Plateau, at 715 metres (2,346 ft) above sea level, near Nusco and Torella dei Lombardi, in the province of Avellino. From there it runs southeast near Lioni before flowing into Lago di Conza, an artificial lake. The river then forms the border between the province of Avellino and the province of Potenza except for a small extension of the province of Avellino near Calitri. The Atella flows into the Ofanto near this point as a right tributary of the river. The river curves north and flows near Monteverde before forming the border between the province of Foggia and the province of Potenza. It then curves east for a distance and a right tributary, the Olivento, flows into it in this area. The river curves northeast and then forms the border between the province of Foggia and the province of Barletta-Andria-Trani. The river flows near Posta Piana, Canosa di Puglia, San Ferdinando di Puglia, and Cannae before entering the Gulf of Manfredonia between Margherita di Savoia and Barletta. The Locone enters the Ofanto south of Cerignola as a right tributary of the river. At the end of its journey to the sea, the river ends in a delta and an estuary.

The River Ofanto can have a torrential flow at times, with major floods along its course in the autumn and winter, thanks to heavy rainfall, but in the summer its flow can be remarkably slight. Despite its considerable length and the extent of its basin, the average flow of water at the river mouth is fairly low, less than 15 cubic metres per second (530 cu ft/s).

== Gallery ==
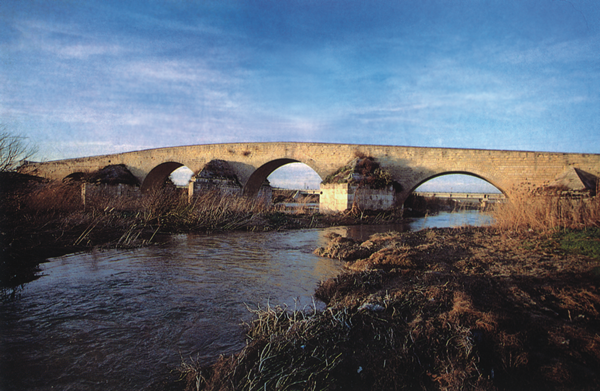
Roman bridge of Canosa di Puglia

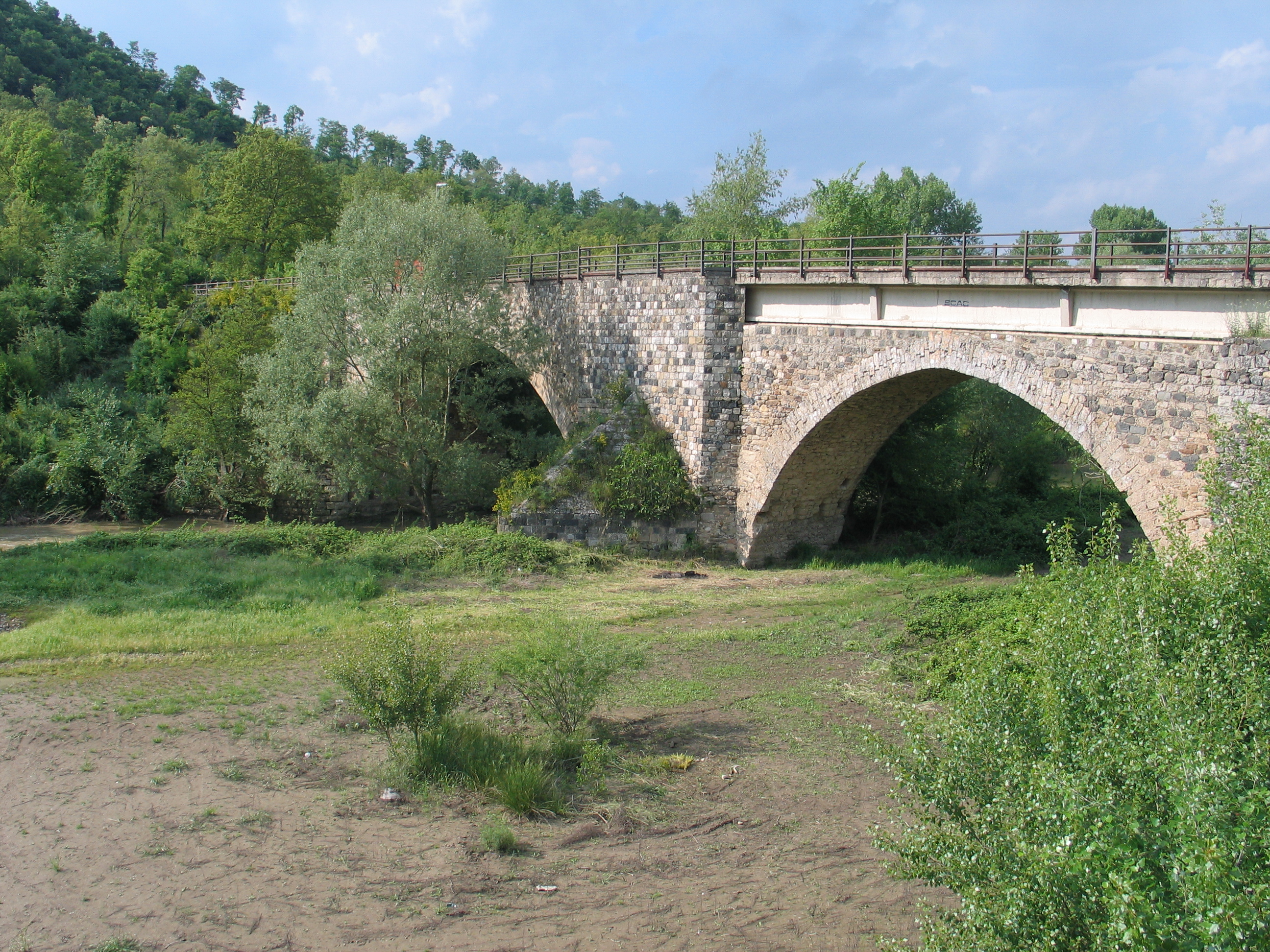
An ancient Roman bridge near Monteverde, Campania

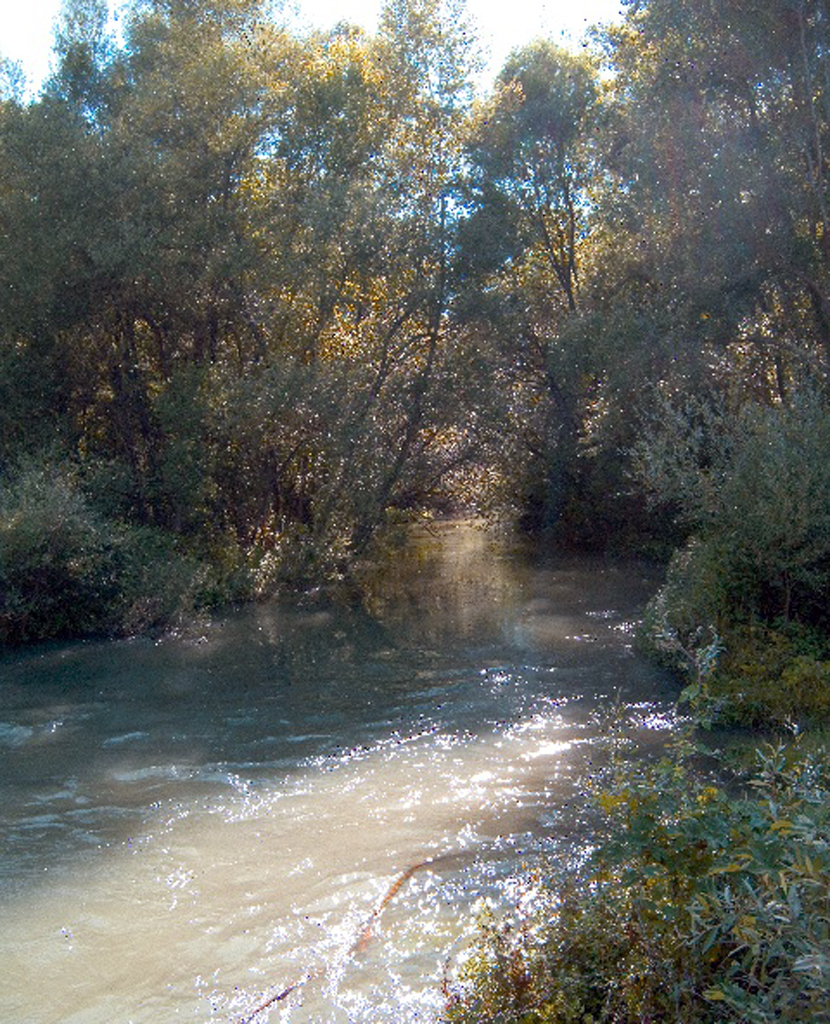
Through Cairano

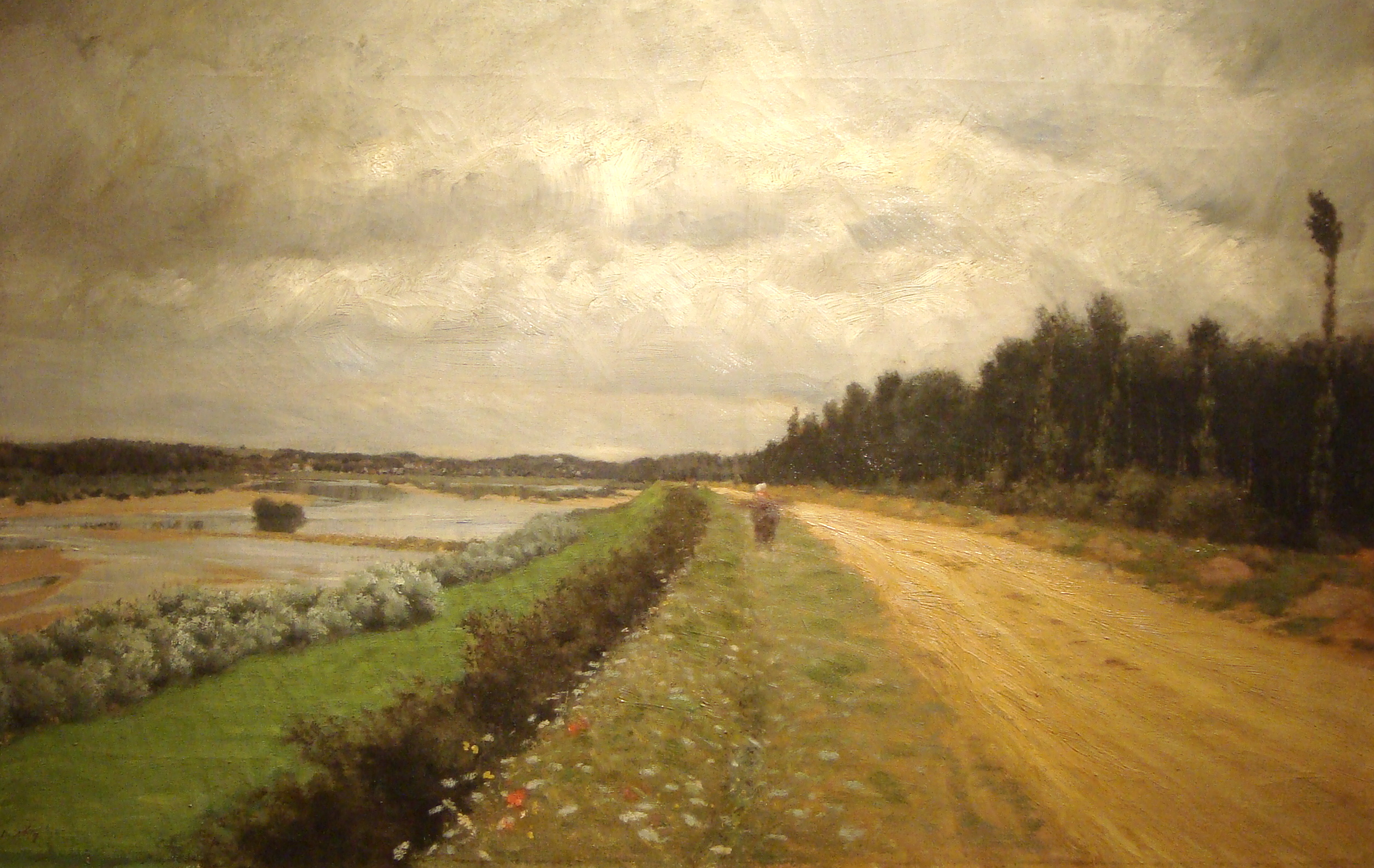
Oil painting Lungo l'Ofanto (1870) by Giuseppe de Nittis (1848–1884), Pinacoteca De Nittis, Barletta, Italy

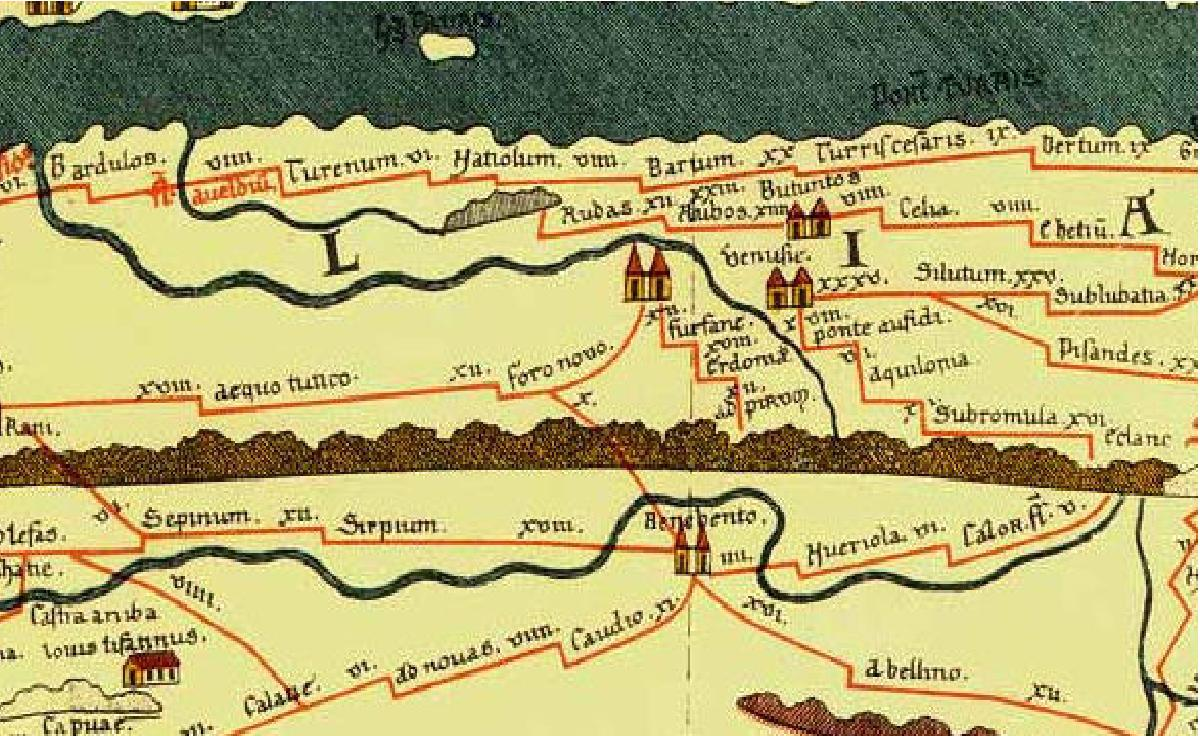
Tabula Peutingeriana showing ancient Aufidus and Via Appia
