= Lago di Conza =

Reservoir in Campania, Italy

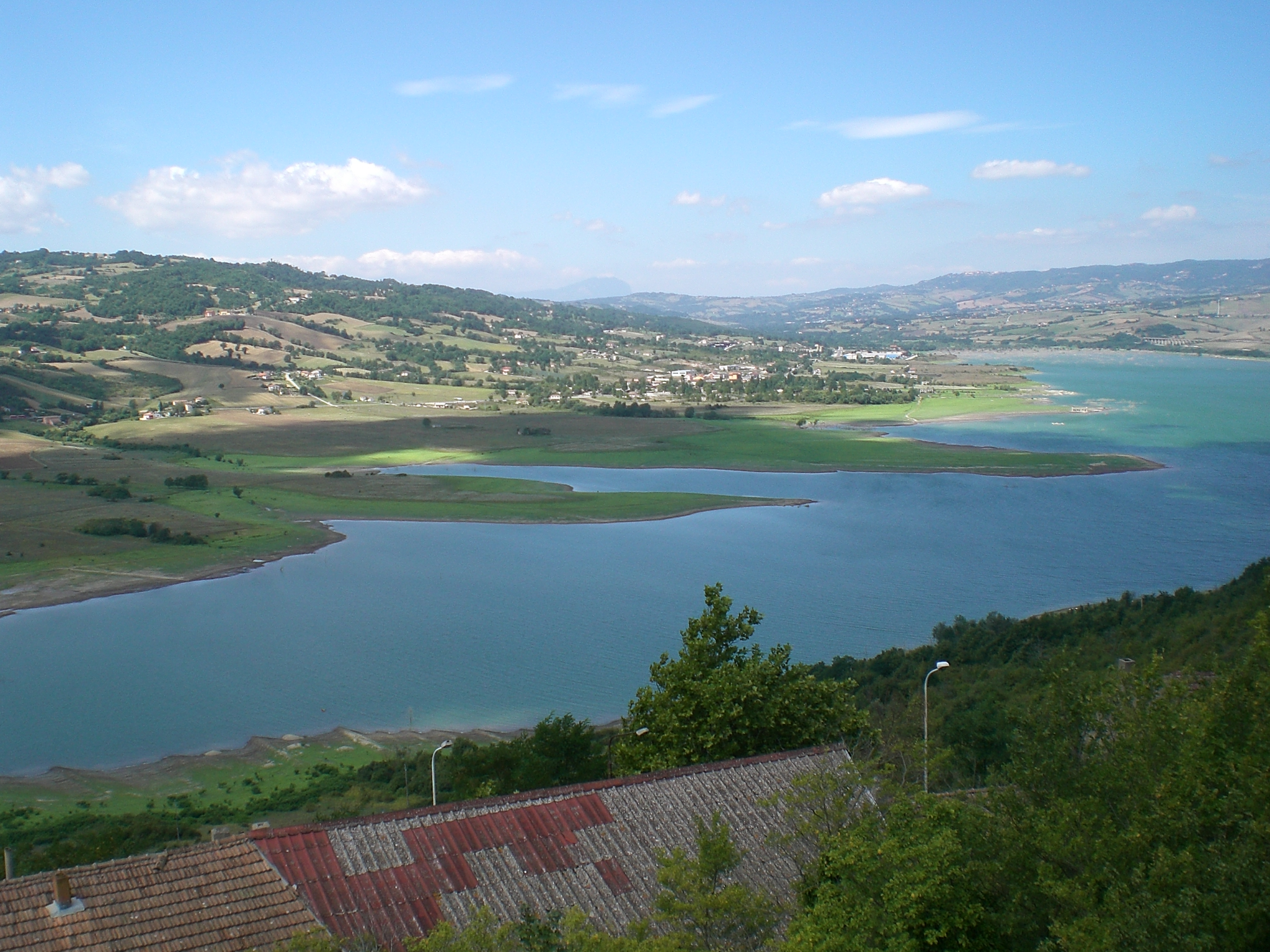

- Location within Italy
- Location: Province of Avellino
- Coordinates: 40°52′51.6″N 15°18′36″E
- Type: reservoir
- Primary inflows: Ofanto
- Primary outflows: Ofanto
- Basin countries: Italy
- Surface area: 800 acres (320 ha)
- Max. depth: 25 m (82 ft)
- Surface elevation: 420 m (1,380 ft)
- Website: www.lagodiconza.it

Lago di Conza is a reservoir in the Campania region of southern Italy. It is in the province of Avellino near the border with the province of Salerno and the province of Potenza. The Ofanto flows into and out of the reservoir. The reservoir was created in the 1970s for the generation of electricity.
