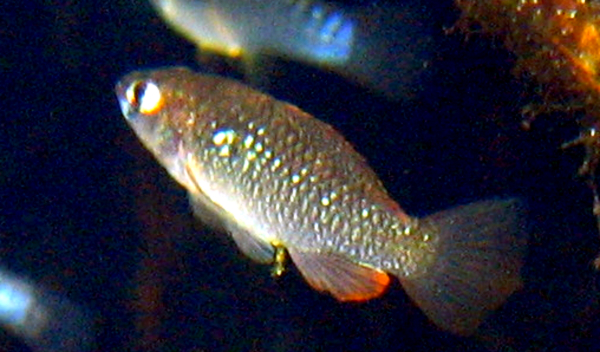
- Rainwater killifish (L. parva)

Scientific classification
- Domain: Eukaryota
- Kingdom: Animalia
- Phylum: Chordata
- Class: Actinopterygii
- Order: Cyprinodontiformes
- Family: Fundulidae
- Genus: Lucania; Girard, 1859

Type species
- Limia venusta Girard, 1858

Species
- See text

= Lucania (fish) =

Genus of fishes

Lucania is a genus of North American ray-finned killifishes in the family Fundulidae. The genus can be found in northeastern Mexico and the southeastern and eastern parts of the United States, with L. parva ranging as far north as Massachusetts. They are mostly found in fresh water, although L. parva also is frequent in coastal brackish water. They are sometimes held in aquariums.

They are small, up to 6.2 cm (2.4 in) in total length.

== Species ==
There are currently three recognized species in this genus:

- Lucania goodei D. S. Jordan, 1880 (Bluefin killifish)
- Lucania interioris C. L. Hubbs & R. R. Miller, 1965 (Cuatrocienegas killifish)
- Lucania parva (S. F. Baird & Girard, 1855) (Rainwater killifish)
