= Laconia (disambiguation) =

Laconia is a historical and administrative region of Greece.

Laconia or Lakonia may also refer to:

== Places ==
- Laconia (constituency), an electoral district of Greece
  - Laconian Greek, a dialect of Doric Greek

=== United States ===
- Laconia, Indiana
- Laconia, New Hampshire
- Laconia, Tennessee

== Ships ==
- RMS Laconia, 1911–1917, sunk in the First World War
- RMS Laconia 1921–1942, sunk in the Second World War
  - Laconia incident, sinking of RMS Laconia and being attacked while rescuing survivors.
- TSMS Lakonia, 1929–1963, caught fire, evacuated and sank in 1963

== See also ==
- Laconian (dog), an extinct dog breed
- Laconia Car Company, a defunct American rolling stock manufacturer
- Loconia, a village in Apulia, Italy
- Laconic
