= Ciolo (Apulia) =

Landform in Salento, Italy

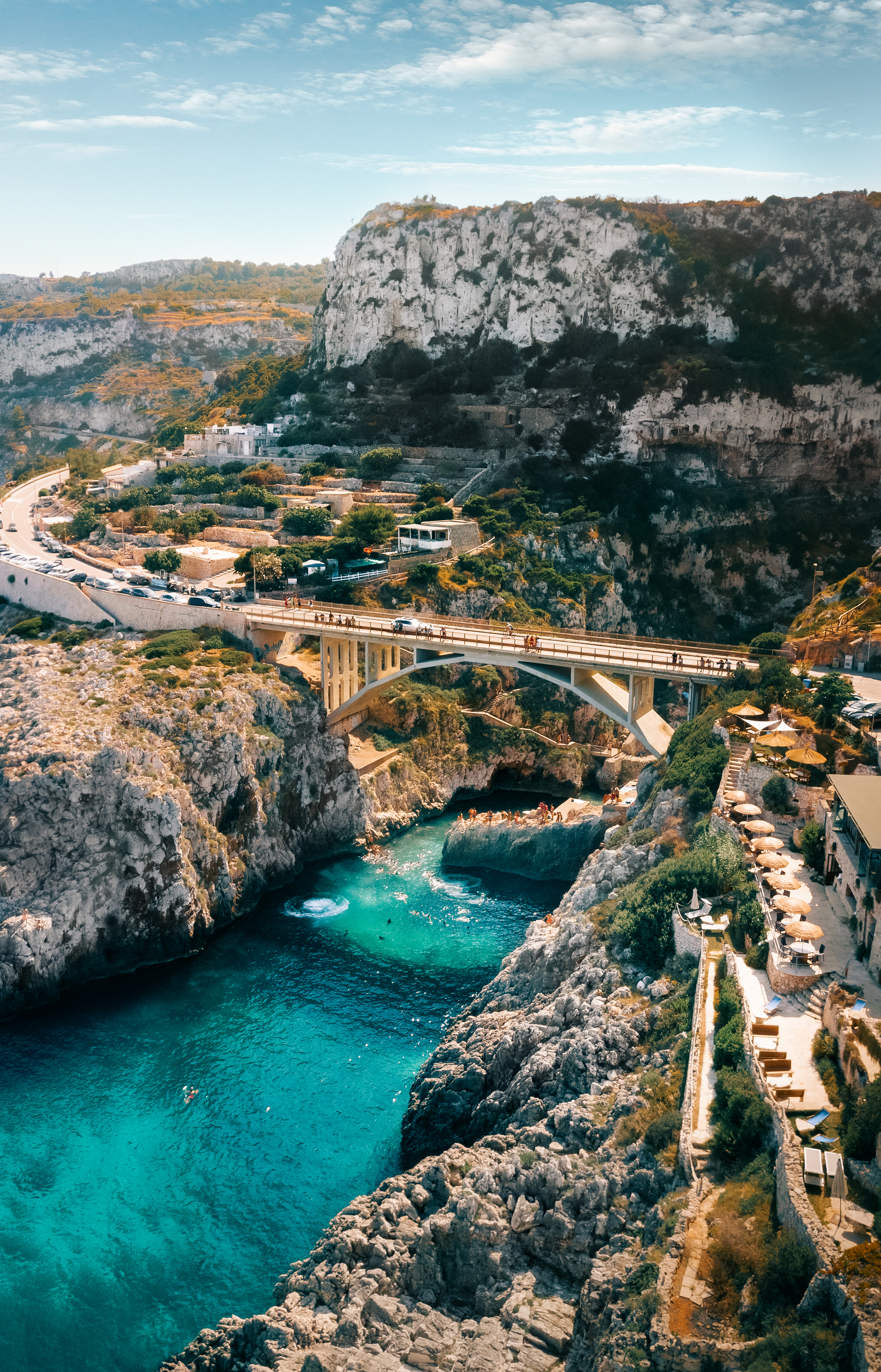
- Panoramic view of Ponte del Ciolo (Ciolo's Bridge)

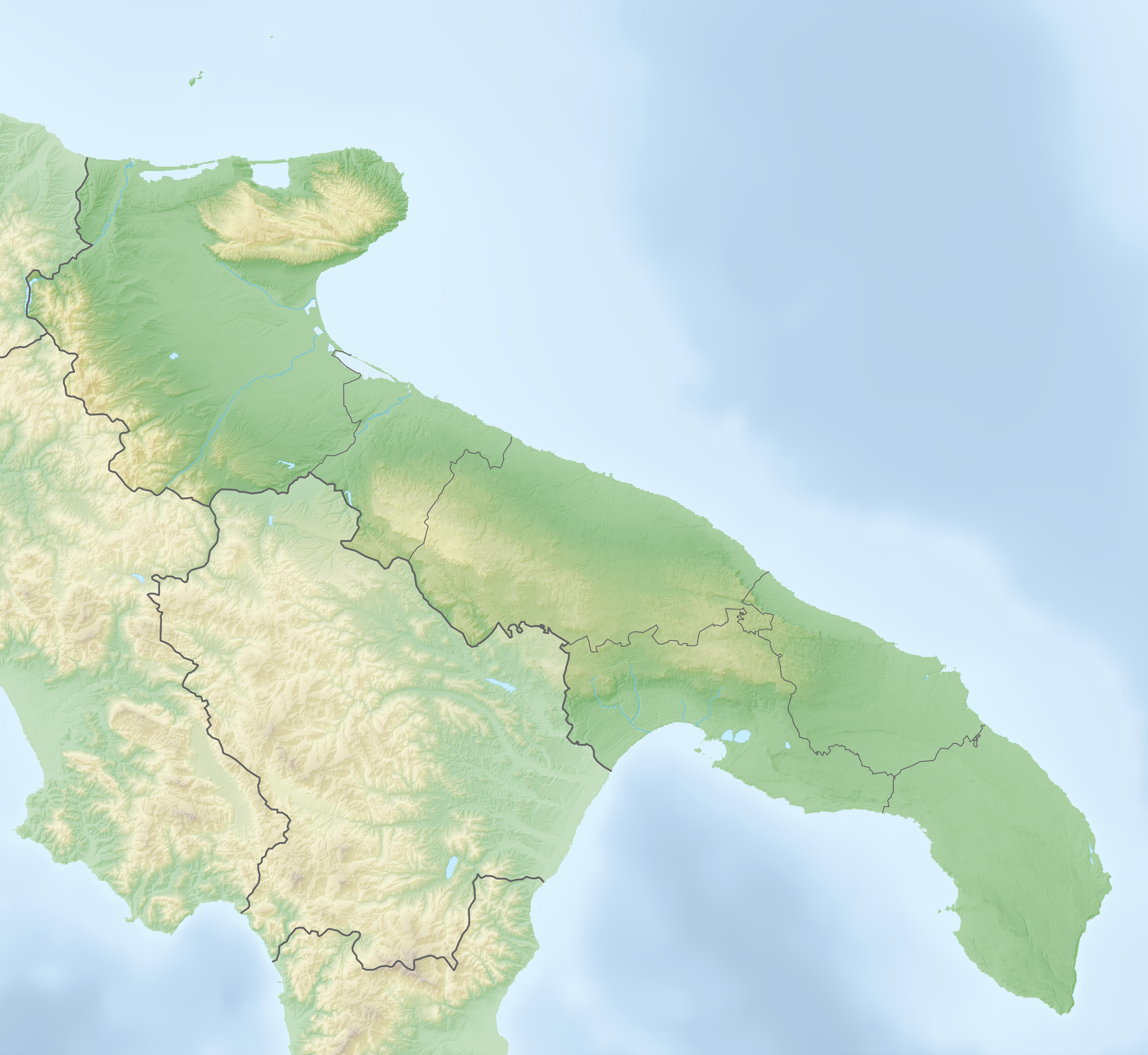
- Location within Italy Location within Apulia
- Floor elevation: 24.50 metres (100 ft)
- Length: 190 metres (620 ft) West-East
- Width: 49 metres (161 ft) North-South
- Depth: 144 metres (472 ft)

Naming
- Native name: Ciole (Sicilian)
- English translation: Magpies

Geography
- Country: (flag) Italy
- State/Province: (flag) Apulia
- Population center: Gagliano del Capo
- Coordinates: 39.84°N 18.38°E
- Traversed by: Ciolo's Bridge, Ciolo's Trail, Cipolliane's Trail
- Interactive map of Ciolo

Ciolo is a narrow coastal inlet and a site of historical and environmental interest, which is located in the south of Apulia, in the historical region of Salento, Italy. The location is also known as a geological site and for the presence of numerous sea caves, the largest one being the Grotta del Ciolo. Since October 2006 the Ciolo's area has become part of the Regional Park "Costa Otranto - Santa Maria di Leuca e Bosco di Tricase", created by the Apulia region to protect the eastern coast of Salento, specifically the architectural assets as well as important animal and plant species.

The name Ciolo comes from the noun in salentino dialect "ciole", which refers to crows or magpies, which are widespread in this region.

== Location ==
Ciolo is located in the comune of Gagliano del Capo, in Apulia and it is part of the Regional Natural Coastal Park of "Costa Otranto Santa Maria di Leuca Bosco di Tricase".

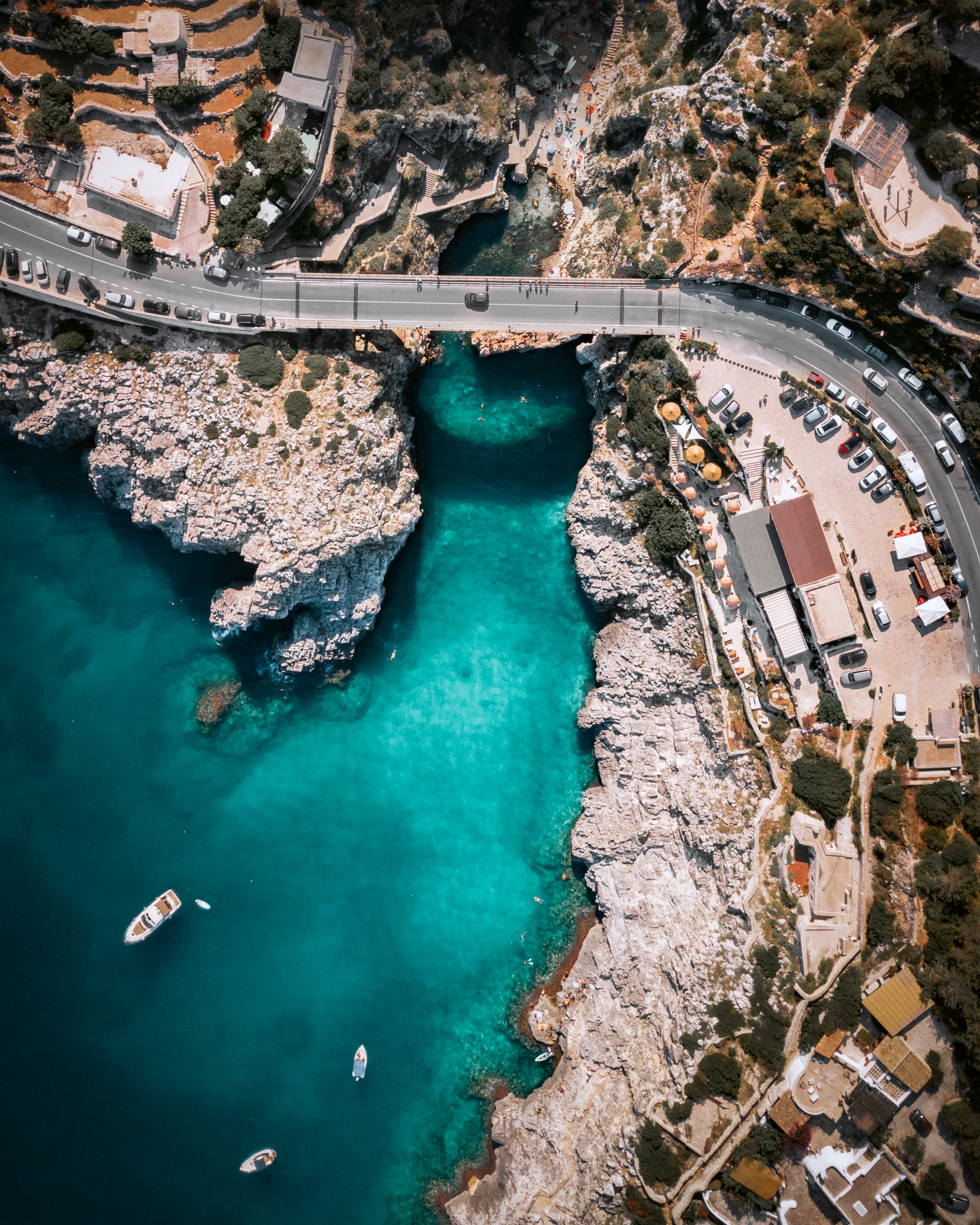
Panoramic view of Ponte del Ciolo (Ciolo's Bridge)

== Ponte del Ciolo (Ciolo's Bridge) ==
Ciolo is dominated by Ponte Ciolo (Ciolo's Bridge), a road bridge built in the 1960s. It crosses the inlet and connects the two shores of Santa Maria di Leuca and Novaglie. The single-span bridge is approximately 23 meters above water, 60 meters long and 10 meters wide.

The first structure, part of a project for the entire coastal road by the engineer Mario Carrone, envisaged a bridge with two continuous spans. This project was unfeasible due to the impossibility to build the central pile, as evidenced by the geo-technical report by the professor and engineer Vincenzo Cotecchia. At that point the engineer Antonio La Tegola was appointed. He adopted the technique of the Swiss engineer Robert Maillart, which required the incorporation of a thin vault and a stiffening deck. For this reason the structure the bridge was called Maillart's Bridge in the preliminary plans and studies.

Ciolo's Bridge was built by rotating the previously planned road axis, an operation that was necessary to find the right supports for the span. There are still some concrete stumps under the current span, which were necessary for the construction of the rib.

Since the construction in the 1960s the bridge has been object of reinforcement and consolidation's works, the last being in the summer of 2019.

== The Ciolo's Caves ==
In Ciolo canyon there are several sea caves formed during the Neolithic and Paleolithic age. In total this area includes three different major caves: the Grotta Grande del Ciolo (Ciolo's Huge Cave), the Grotta Piccola Del Ciolo (Ciolo's Small Cave) and the Grotta Delle Prazziche (Cave of the Prazziche).

Caves	Coordinates	Length (in meters)	Width (in meters)
Grotta Piccola Del Ciolo	39° 50' 38'' N 18° 23' 11'' E	120	-missing-
Grotta Grande Del Ciolo	39° 50' 13'' N 18° 23' 04'' E	120	-missing-
Grotta Delle Prazziche	39° 50' 42" N 18° 23' 05.6" E	40	6

=== Grotta Piccola Del Ciolo ===
The Grotta Piccola Del Ciolo, also called the "Grotta della foca monaca" (Cave of the monk seal), is a semi-submerged cave located in the homonymous cove. Its entrance is located on the west side of the canyon (facing the sea) and it is set on a fracture slightly enlarged by water.

The main cave develops linearly for more than 120 meters, which makes it one of the longest in all the Salento sub-peninsula. The cave is formed by different chambers: on the west side of the entrance there is a natural chamber about 30 meters long and in the terminal part of the main cave there is a tiny beach. It was in this chamber that the speleologist Franco Grandi found a monk seal, which gave the name to the cave itself. Inside a source of fresh water is available. From a strictly biological point of view, different studies have been carried out during the years in the cave by different research teams coordinated by the University of Salento, University of Modena and Reggio Emilia and University of Urbino. Since 2000, studies have been performed on benthic hard substrate stands living in the cave as well as taxonomic studies on the fauna able to live on the sea bottom and on the planktonic one. The studies have revealed a diverse sea bottom community even on little scale but very stable in time even if decreasing. The plankton analysed has appeared rich in nutrition, indicating that the decline of the community may relate to other factors, such as the possible infiltration of fresh water.

=== Grotta Grande Del Ciolo ===
The Grotta Grande Del Ciolo is also known by different names, such as Grotta degli Spiriti (Ghosts' Cave), Grotta dei Passeri (Sparrows' Cave) (Note: Both tree sparrow and willow sparrow are native to the area.) and Bocca del Pozzo (Well's Mouth). The cave is semi-submerged and is characterized by a wide entrance, the result of an ancient phenomenon of collapse that partially occluded a portion of the archeological substrate of the cave, about 20 meters above the sea level, leaving the remaining portion exposed to sea erosion provoked by the constant inflow and then outflow of water and waves. The cave develops longitudinally by 120 meters and the height of the entrance is over 30 meters, progressively decreasing along its longitudinal development.

The cave contains a pond generated by a source of fresh water which originates from a subterranean source near its location.

=== Grotta Delle Prazziche ===
Grotta Delle Prazziche is one of the main caves near Ciolo, and is accessible by boat. The structure of the cave is circular, and at the top there is a vertical syphon to the open air. Many studies have been carried out inside and some prehistoric remains have been found, including handcrafts belonging to the Neolithic, ceramics and remains of rhinos.

== Geology ==
The eastern coast of Salento is a noteworthy geological location due to the events that took place in the Mediterranean area starting from the Cretaceous period.

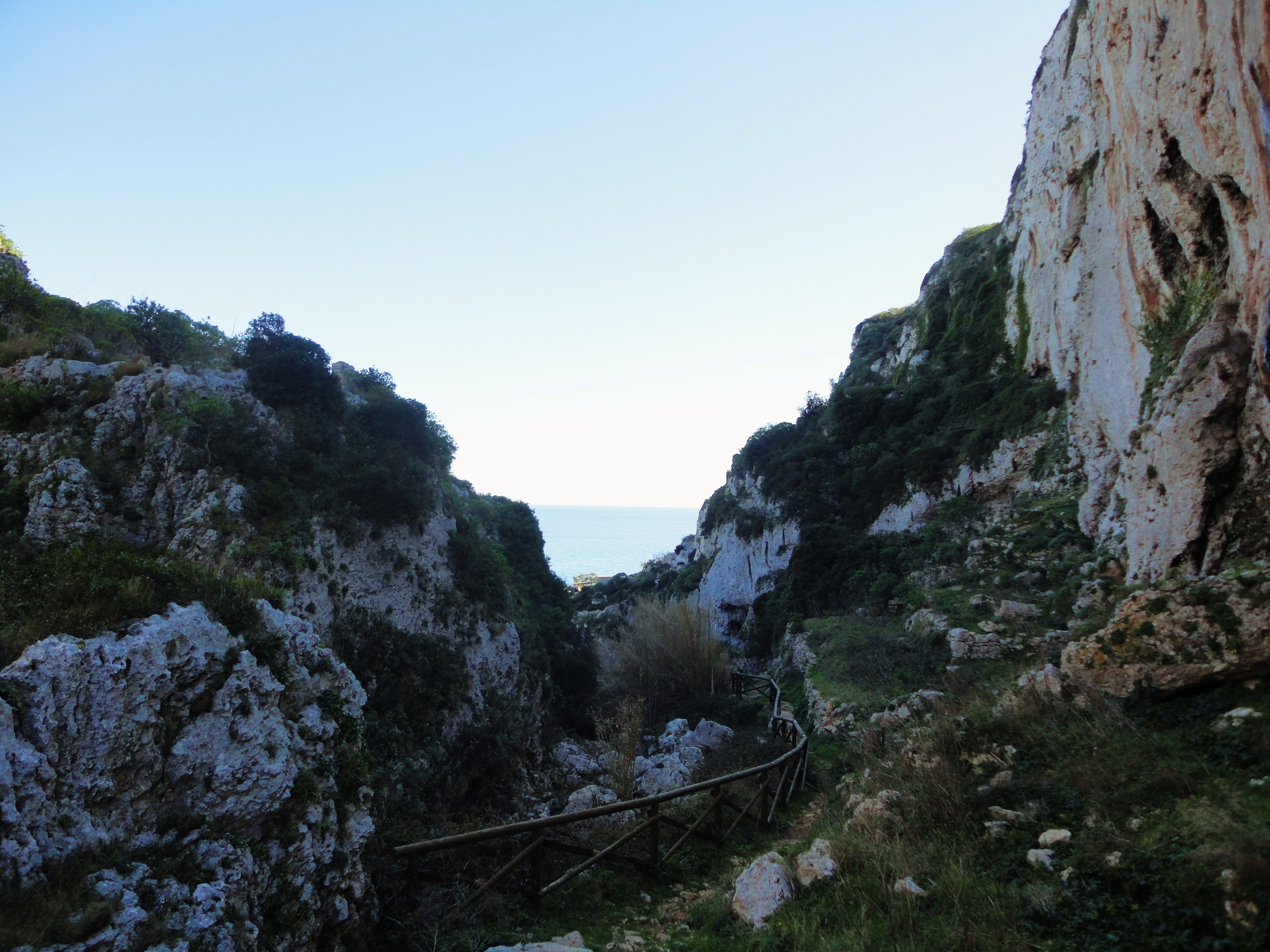
Limestone ridge of Ciolo

Ciolo is mostly formed by a lower part of the stratigraphic succession, which includes Cretaceous bioclastic limestones and breccias and conglomerates of the dating to the late Oligocene (Chattian). In this area there are deposits of phosphatic limestone formations, phosphatic conglomerates and phosphatic concentrations. The upper part consists of Miocene aged limestone. The limestones present in the Ciolo area is characterized by bioclastic calcarenites and calcirudites and it is recognizable by its parallel and oblique lamination.

== Flora ==
In Ciolo's area several botanical rarities can be found: mediterranean onion species, ferns, the Alyssum of Leuca, the Fiordaliso of Leuca, the Campanula pugliese, the Vicia Giacominiana and several type of rare orchids.

=== Ferns ===
Ciolo is an hypogeal habitat for botanical species like cryptogams: algae, mosses and ferns. There are about sixty species of bryophytes living in the caves of Apulia which have been studied, including fifteen types of ferns.

Focusing the attention on the caves in Apulia, it is worth considering the distribution of ferns (Filicopsida). Ferns have interested many scientists since the 1950s and 1960s, the biggest contributions to the studies in this area were made by Franco Anelli, Francesco Orfino and Pietro Parenzan. They mainly focused on Grotta di Castellana but extended their studies also to Ciolo. The University of Lecce undertook pteridological studies on this territory.

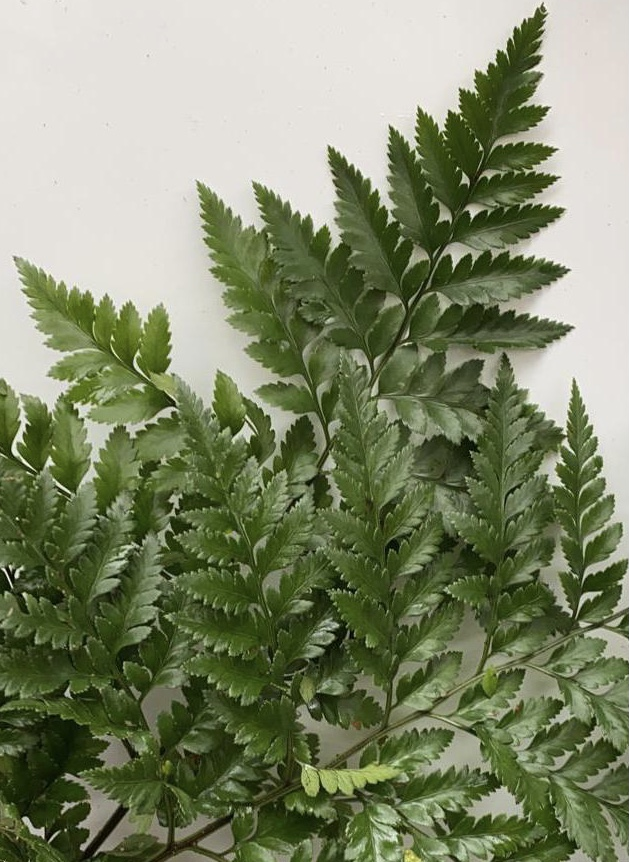
Close up on Ferns' leaves

The caves have very limited examples of phototrophic vegetation. There are some cases in which it is possible to find etiolate plants inside these caves. These plants grow from seeds transported by water, but without light they do not grow enough and then they die. For their sexed reproduction high humidity is essential, humidity is also the reason for the low desiccation process.

Ciolo's Caves are the only certified sites in Apulia where Asplenium marinum exists. Ciolo's Caves are on the boundary of the Eastern area of this species.

The morphology of the caves has determined their plant colonization. The wide entrance of some of the caves have created an ideal plant habitat and supports a major vegetal population. Populations are small and with a poor capability to adapt. There is scientific evidence that a unique event of colonization gave birth to single fern populations. Protected habitats can function as shelters (they protect some species) if they have particular micro-climatic conditions, thus they act for species which haven't found a balance with the changeable environment.

The status of phytogeographic relict can be defined only for some species of ferns. Following the hypothesis of Pichi Sermolli the Asplenium marines in Apulia in Ciolo could be a relic from the wet period of the Pleistocene.

It is possible to track different chorological models in the Ciolo using the distribution of Asplenium marinum. There is an hypothesis that the species is present in this territory as a relic banished to an hypogeal habitat due to climate changes.

=== Alyssum of Leuca ===
Along the paths that cover the area of Ciolo some botanical species of flowers can be found such as the Alyssum, a typical plant of this part of the region. It can be easily found due to the fact that it usually grows under the solar exposition, it is resistant to both cold and warm weather, and it can grow in stony and dry areas.

=== Vicia Giacominiana ===
The Vicia Giacominiana is a special type of plant native of Salento. It is a therophyte, and it is usually two meters high. It flowers during the months of April and May.

Its flowers are fuchsia, arranged in groups of racemes with a stem twice the length of the leaves. The Vicia Giacominiana is found exclusively within herbaceous communities of plants.

=== Fiordaliso of Leuca ===
The Fiordaliso of Leuca is a rare plant, native from the area of Salento, which grows above limestone cliffs and next to the sea.

It is a perennial, bushy and thick plant, that can reach the height of 30 up to 60 meters.

=== Carnation of Salento ===
The Carnation of Salento, also called Dianthus Japigicus Bianco & Brullo, of the Caryophyllaceae family, is a new species of Cernation born in Salento that grows on the limestone walls between Otranto and Santa Maria di Leuca. These plants have branched stems and their flowers consist of five pink or purple petals with a jagged edge.

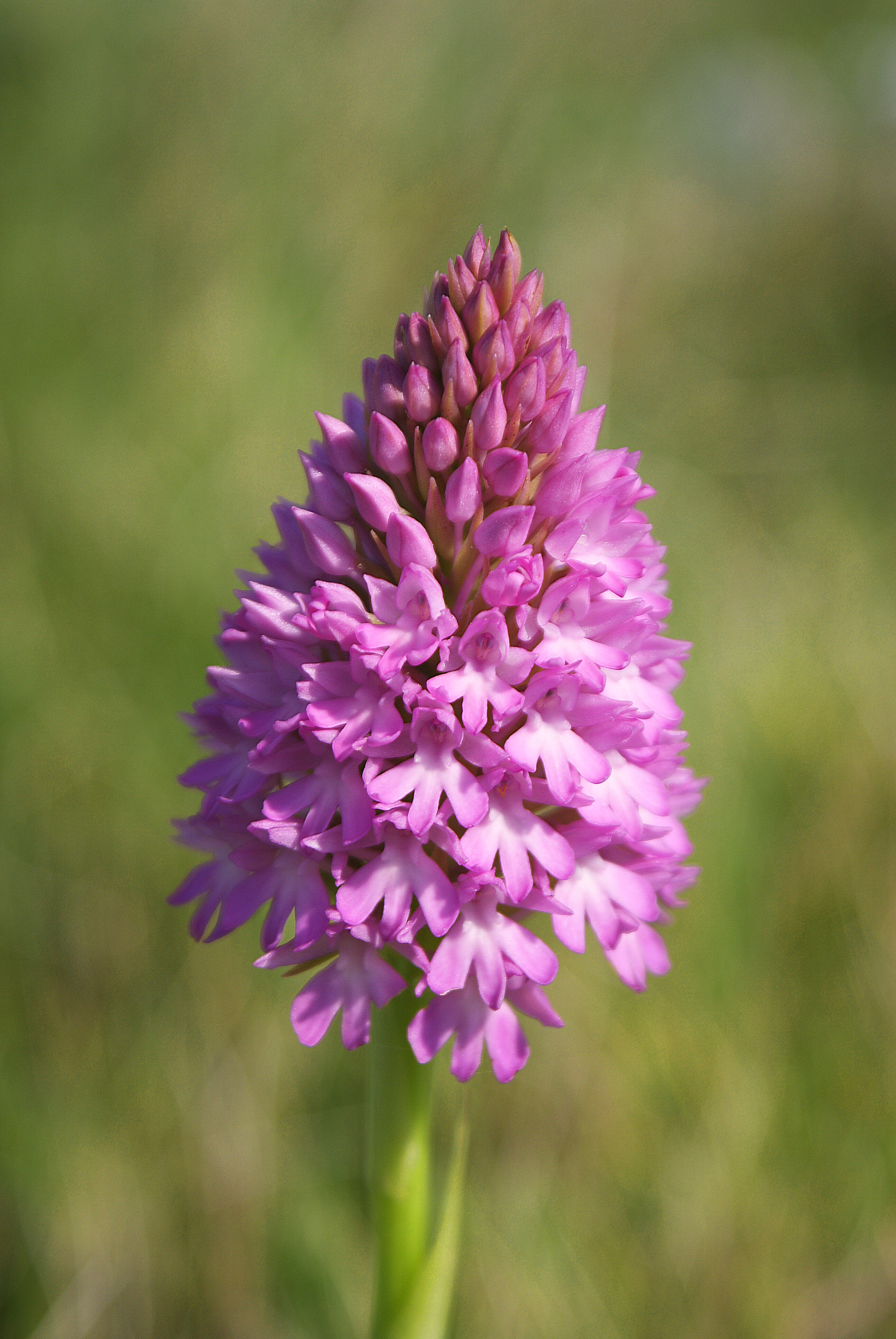
Pyramidal orchid

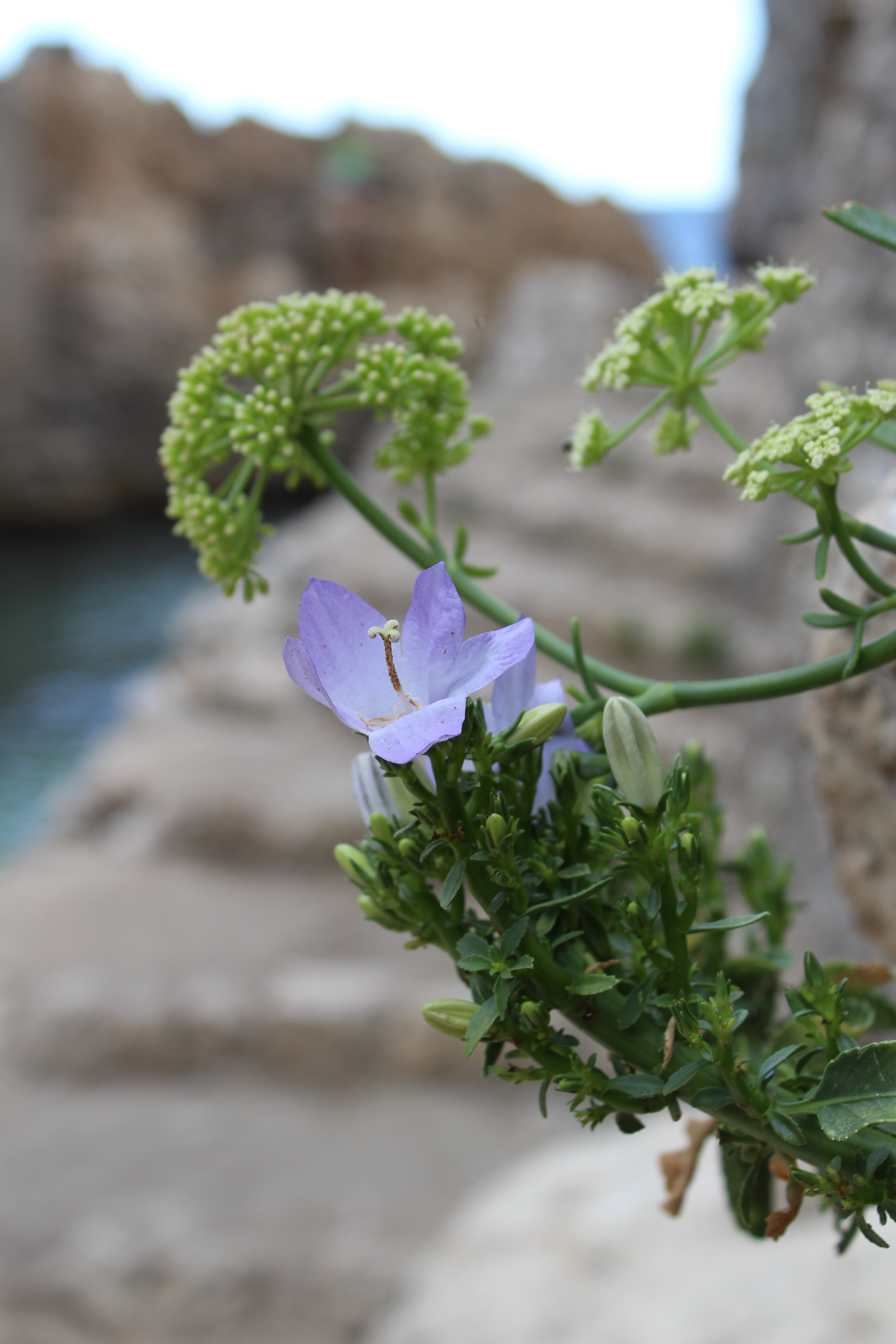
Campanula pugliese at Ciolo

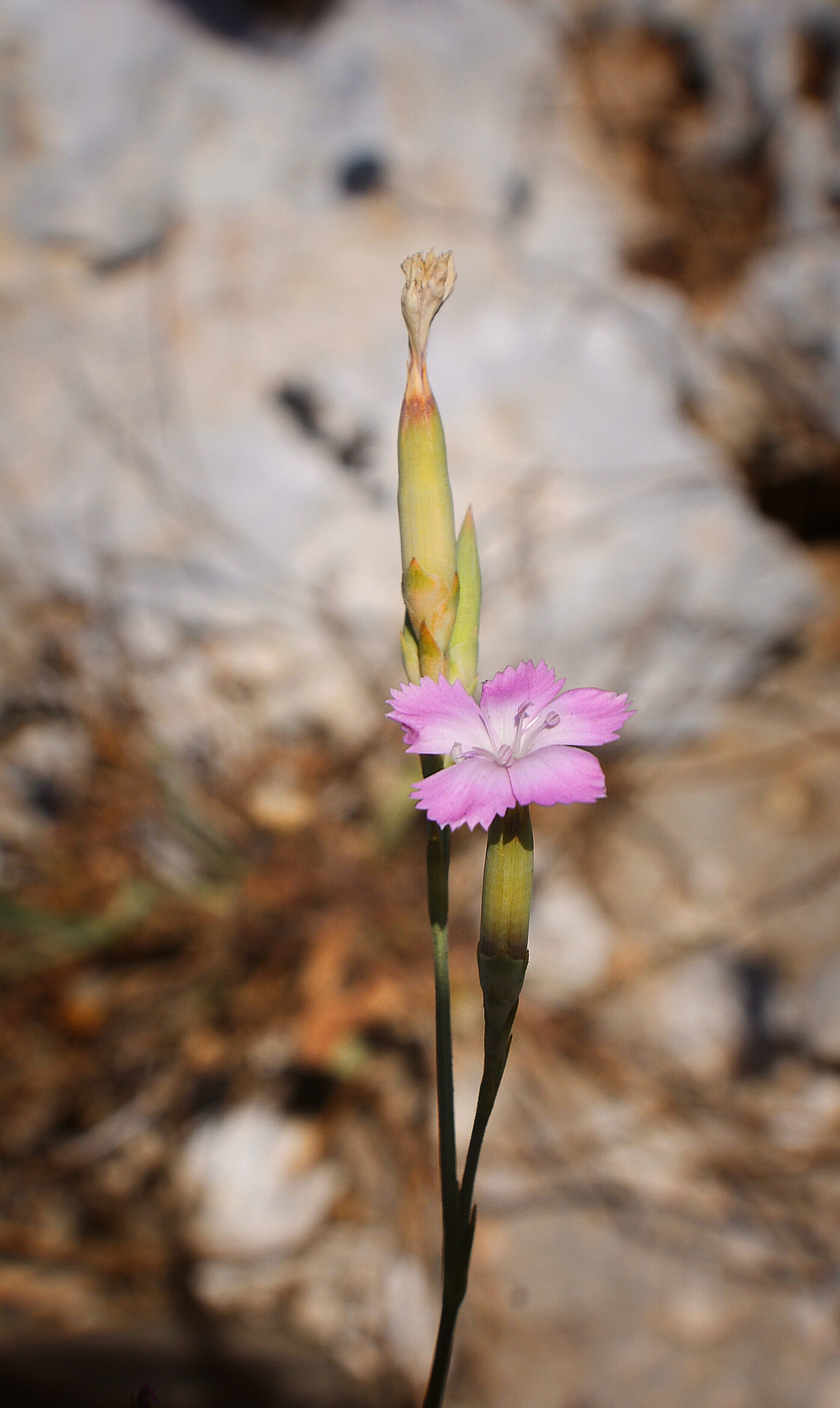
Carnation of Salento

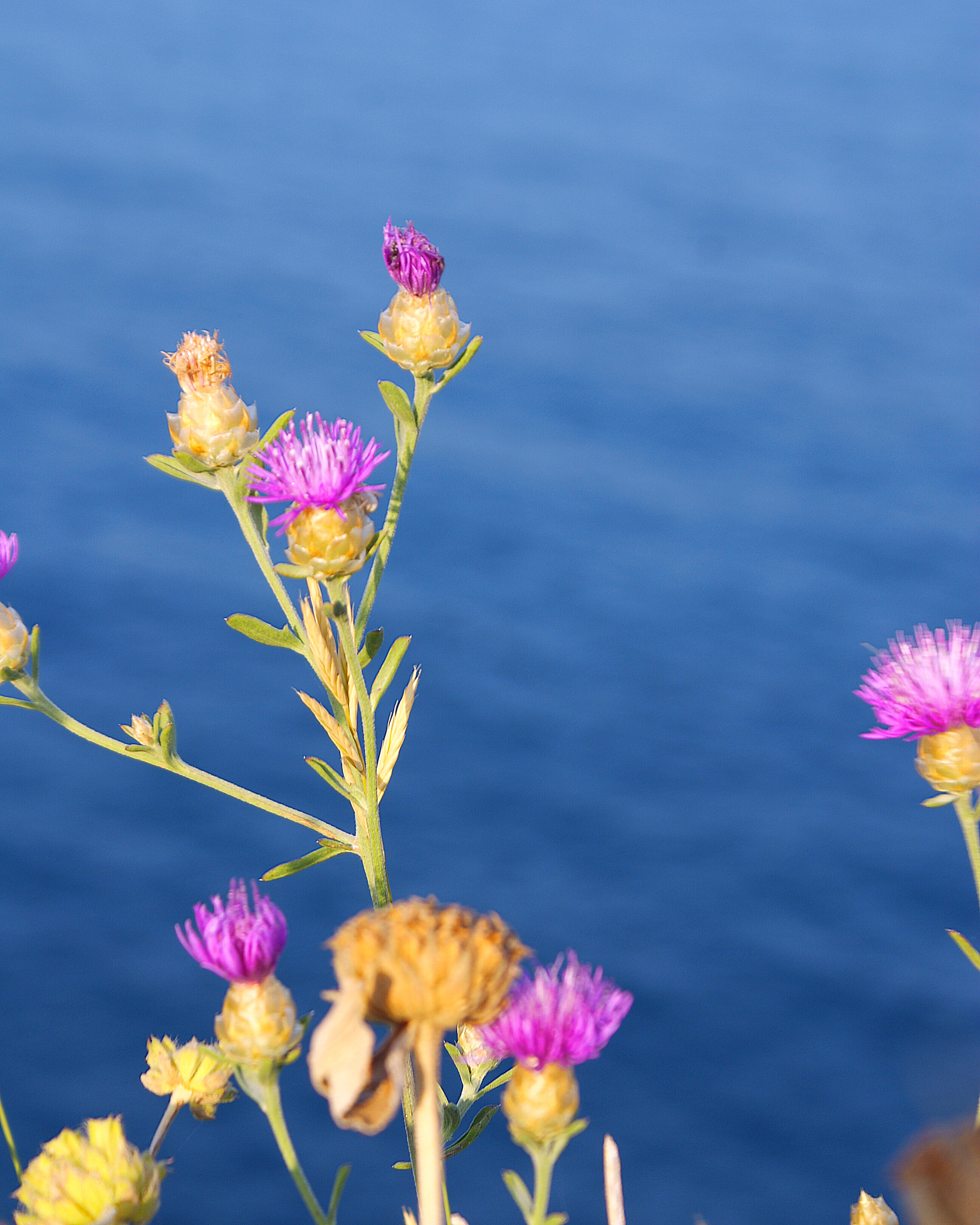
Fiordaliso Nobile

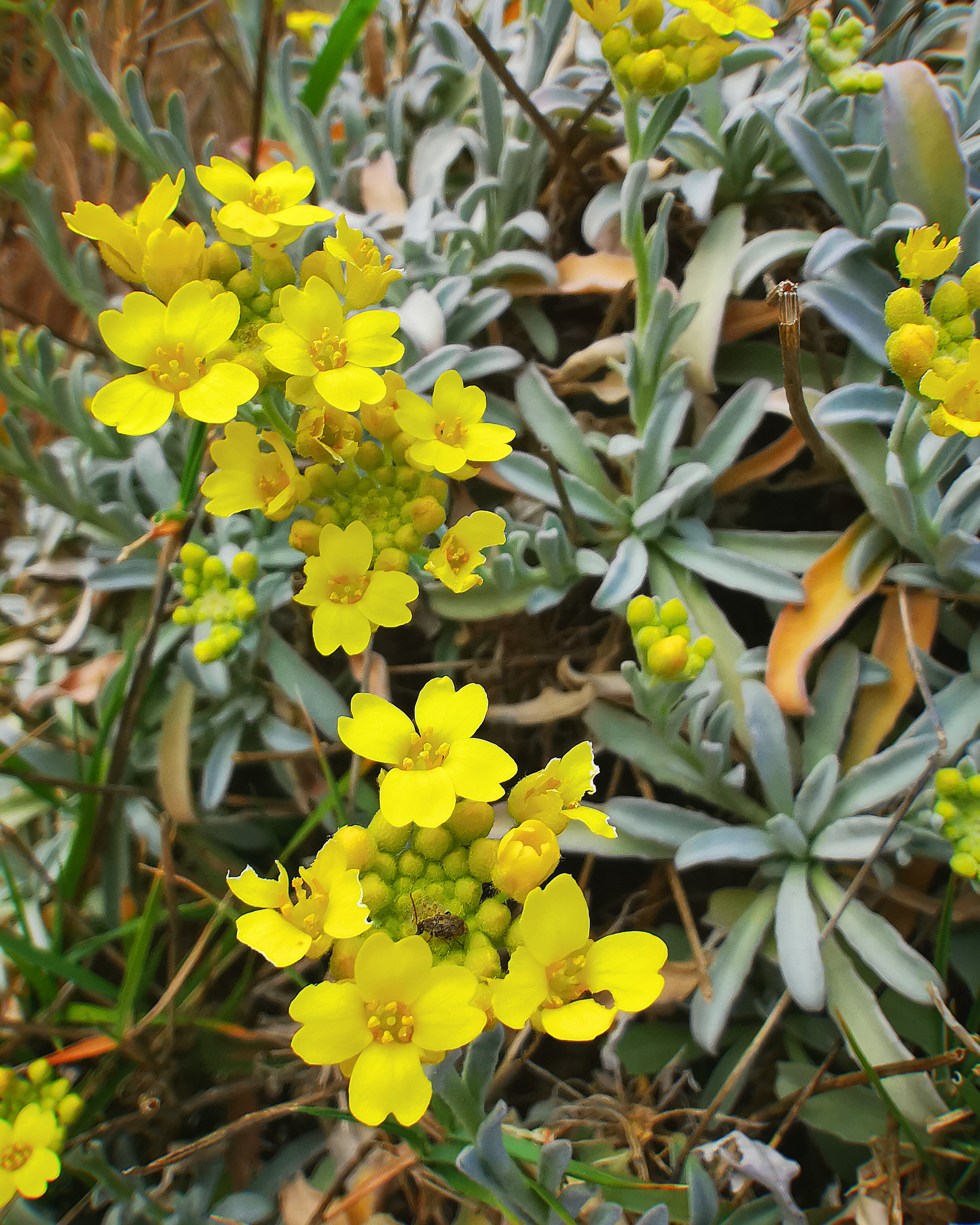
Alisso of Leuca

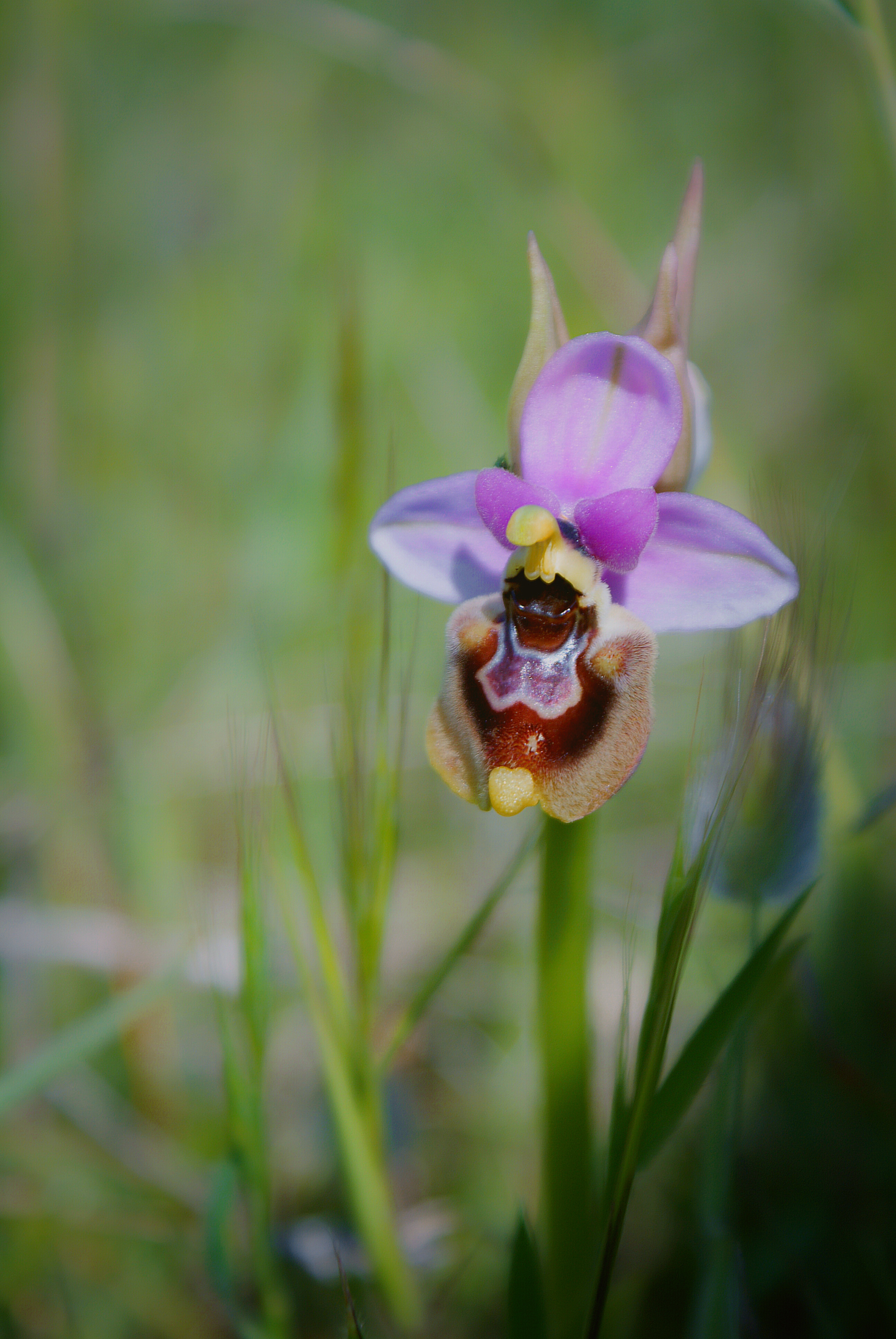
Ophrys
Photos by Lory Mauro and Eugenia Alessia Casamassima

== Fauna ==
=== Marine fauna ===
The area, being part of the "Regional Park Otranto - Santa Maria di Leuca Coast", has been the subject of numerous studies regarding the fauna. Studies show that thirty-two different fish species are present.

The Grotta Piccola del Ciolo is considered as a protective nursery for the new born of different species of fish and echinoderms; in fact numerously starfish, sea urchins, brittle stars, sea cucumbers, and crustaceans have been found.

Vagile Meiofauna is a kind of fauna which includes invertebrates of marine and fresh water habitats. Knowledge about this particular branch of the fauna is scarce, however the area of the Grotta del Ciolo has been the subject of many studies regarding the community composition of these populations of invertebrates. The studies conducted in 2002 were made using baked-plates, and positioning them in three levels.

After 24 months in total (it took 24 months to make the number of taxa and abundances at the three distinguishable positions) the results showed that Harpacticoida copepods, Nematoda and Foraminifera were the most abundant meiofaunal taxa (the panel surface removed and studied was a total of 75 taxa). Each position of the three showed different results, they revealed a high colonisation capacity of the meiofauna, an active and passive interaction with the algae. The presence of the algae makes the habitat more complex in terms of protection from predators and trophic source.

The way in which the agile meiofauna is distributed is due to environmental constraints, the artificial substrates and their dispersal properties. These studies concluded that making a better taxonomical identification and using a more effective capture method will help in a more detailed individualism of the differences.

In this area the Arachnanthus Oligopodus, a species of the Arachnactidae family, has also been found in the depths of the Grotta Piccola del Ciolo.

In the Grotta Piccola del Ciolo, other species have also been found such as: Noctiluca Scintillans, Cassidulinacea indet., Globigerinacea indet., Miliolina indet., Rotaliacea indet., Rotaliina indet. Spirillinidae, Textulariina indet., Astrosphaeridae indet., Spumellaridae indet., Acanthostomella conicoides, Condonella aspera, Codonellopsis monacensis, Codonellopsis schabii, Eutintinnus fraknoi, Eutintinnus tubulosus, Petalotricha ampulla, Rhabdonellaspiralis, Salpingella acuminata, Stenosemella ventricosa, Tiarinafusus, Tintinnopsis beroidea, Tintinnopsis campanula, Tintinnopsis cincta, Tintinnopsis lieni, Tintinnopsis radix, Undella cleparedei, Undella clevei and Undella subcaudata.

=== Plankton ===
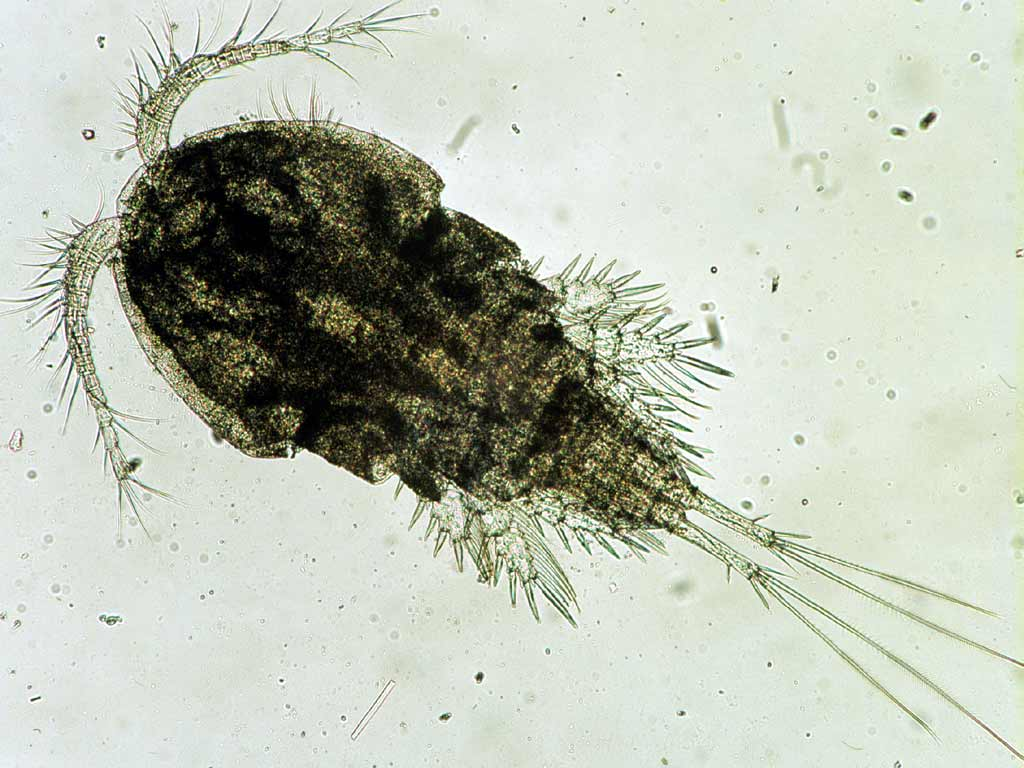
Cyclopodia

Since 2000, studies have shown the presence of benthic populations of hard substrate living in the caves. The data that emerged refer to a highly varied benthic wall community, on a small scale but very stable over time since, studied with two-year engraftment experiments.

The cave plankton appeared to be more affected by the hyperbenthos than the external specimens.

Mysidacea represented the most conspicuous component of the cave plankton, with two species typical in the Salento marine caves, Hemimysis margalefi and Siriella jaltensis. Harpacticoida copepods, together with asexual algal propagules, dominate the cave plankton numerically, whereas Calanoida and Cyclopoida copepods with mollusc veligers characterise the plankton of the external environment.

The annual community composition changes seasonally, with clear horizontal partitioning of the plankton and significant differences between the two stations of the cave.

Higher water turbulence has been proposed as the reason for the presence of asexual propagules even in the inner cave station. An explanation of the benthos impoverishment has been proposed as an alternative to the current 'trophic depletion' theory.

=== Land fauna ===
In the sand present in the bottom of the Grotta Piccola del Ciolo scientists discovered Arachnanthus oligopodus, previously found only in a cave in Marseille; ten species of interstitial Gastrotrichs, three of which unknown; and, a species of Priapulida, previously only known in the tropics.

=== Paleoenviroment ===
In the Ciolo's area remnants of Hippwrites cornucopiae, Cymopolia decastroi, Cymopolia barattoloi, dating back to the upper Maastrichtian age, were found.

== Tourism ==
During the summer season, the Ciolo is a tourist location. The morphology of the territory, with a number of caves and inlets, offers a spot protected from wind and sun, for all those who want to experience the sea and the coast. In the same period of the year the cove is sheltered from the wind and remains accessible in rough sea conditions. The location attracts many tourists also due to its close proximity to Santa Maria di Leuca.

=== Trekking ===
The Ciolo's area offers trekking and hiking activities via the footpaths of the Regional Natural Coastal Park to Novaglie,. This path is called The Sentiero del Vecchio Ciolo (the path of the Old Ciolo), and The Sentiero delle Cipolliane (the Cipolliane's path), and it gives access to the natural and historical features of the region.

==== Sentiero del vecchio Ciolo ====
The path can be walked in both ways: from Ciolo to Gagliano Del Capo and vice-versa.

Ciolo can be reached on foot along a 4 kilometer path, starting from the center of Gagliano del Capo. From Ciolo to Gagliano del Capo it is possible to access the trail by a long staircase next to Ciolo's Bridge that provides access to the small cove; from there, leaving the sea behind, it is possible to climb the steep path that leads up to Gagliano del Capo. The route crosses the rock cliffs which contain numerous prehistoric caves; the whole path is completely surrounded by the characteristic Mediterranean landscape and also by certain rare species of plants such as the Alyssum of Leuca, the Vicia Giacominiana, the Anagyris foetida and different rare species of Orchidaceae. Bird watchers can observe frequent sightings of migrating waders, jackdaws and rock pigeons; whereas sightings of the Eleonora's falcon are rarer. It is also possible to see different small chapels and votive aediculas in honour of Madonna di Leuca, symbolic of the area.

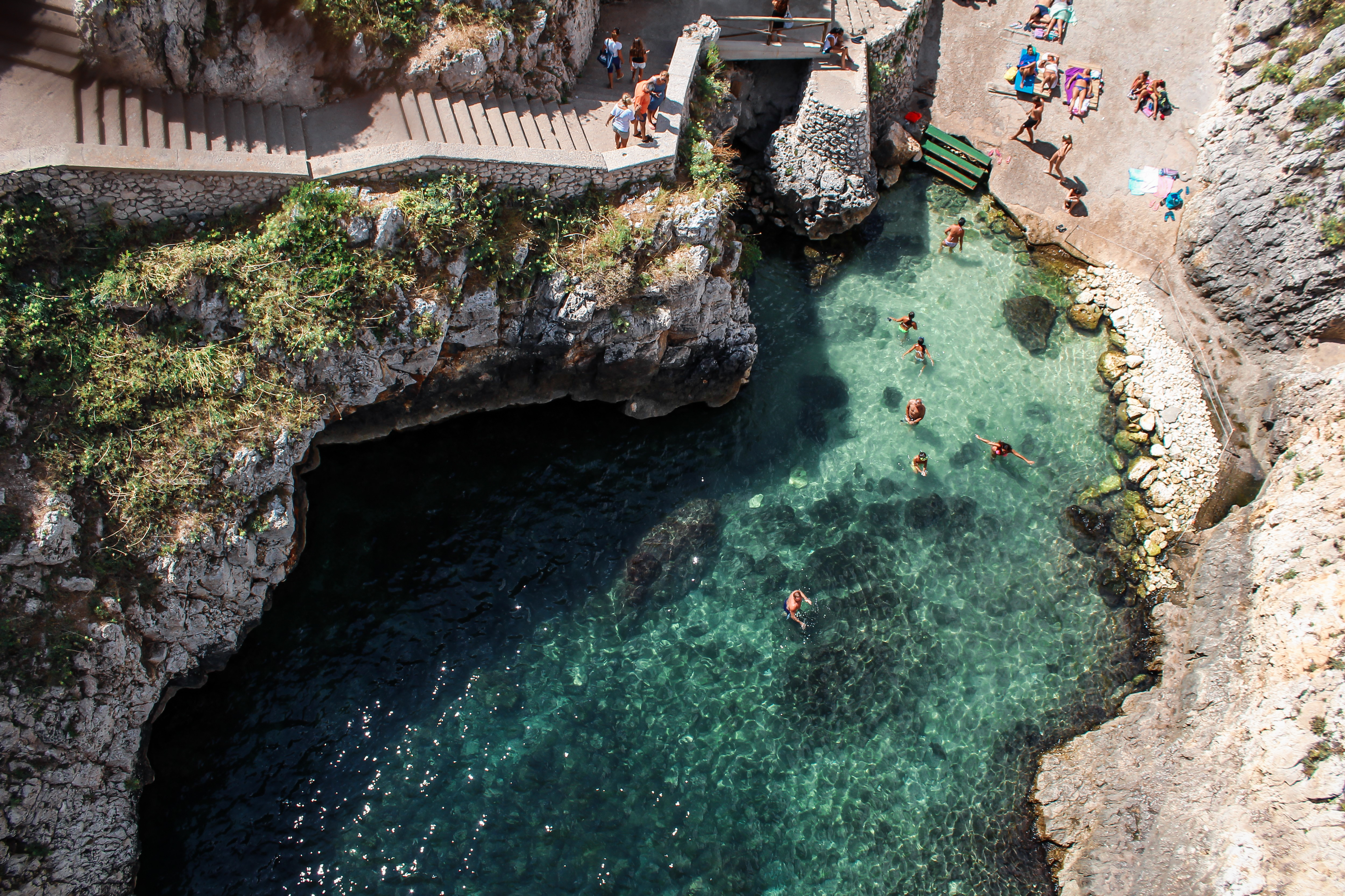
View from Ponte Del Ciolo (Ciolo's Bridge)

=== High diving ===
One of the main tourist attractions is Ponte del Ciolo (Ciolo's Bridge), the bridge that connects the two crags and from which it is possible to high dive.

=== Scuba diving ===
It is possible to access the sea for swimming and scuba diving. Scuba divers, in Ciolo, have also the opportunity to explore the Grotta Grande del Ciolo. Although some points of the cave are quite narrow, it is possible for divers to explore the cave for its entire length safely with a little preparation.

=== Rock climbing ===
The Ciolo's cliff is the major sport climbing venue of the Salento region. It was the location of the Salento Climbing Fest event in 2013.

The cliff is equipped with expansion bolt protection, and was re-equipped as part of the Salento Verticale project, by local climbers and the Ragni di Lecco mountaineering club, in 2013.

There are over fifty routes, ranging in grade (climbing) from 4 to 7b+. Ciolo is also a location for deep-water soloing.

== Curiosities ==
=== The Legend ===
There is a local legend about Ciolo which involves the Turks and a bell. During an invasion in Apulia by the Turkish Army, the soldiers landed in the Ciolo's area and looted Gagliano del Capo. A bell was part of their loot, however they found themselves in a storm and the bell fell off the boat into the sea. It is said that the bell rings every 24 December, the day of its disappearance.

== The Regional Coastal Park ==
The Otranto coast up to Santa Maria di Leuca is a Regional park that has been established by the Regional Law of 26 October 2006 n.30 creating a protected area of priority interest. The park was created with the aim of safeguarding the natural heritage of the protected area and enhancing the territory on a sustainable management model, protecting its biodiversity and supporting the economy of the local communities.

It is one of the biggest natural parks in the province of Lecce. Its area extends along the Salento coast for 57 kilometers and embraces an important cultural, geological and landscape heritage characterized by the presence of faunistic and floristic species.

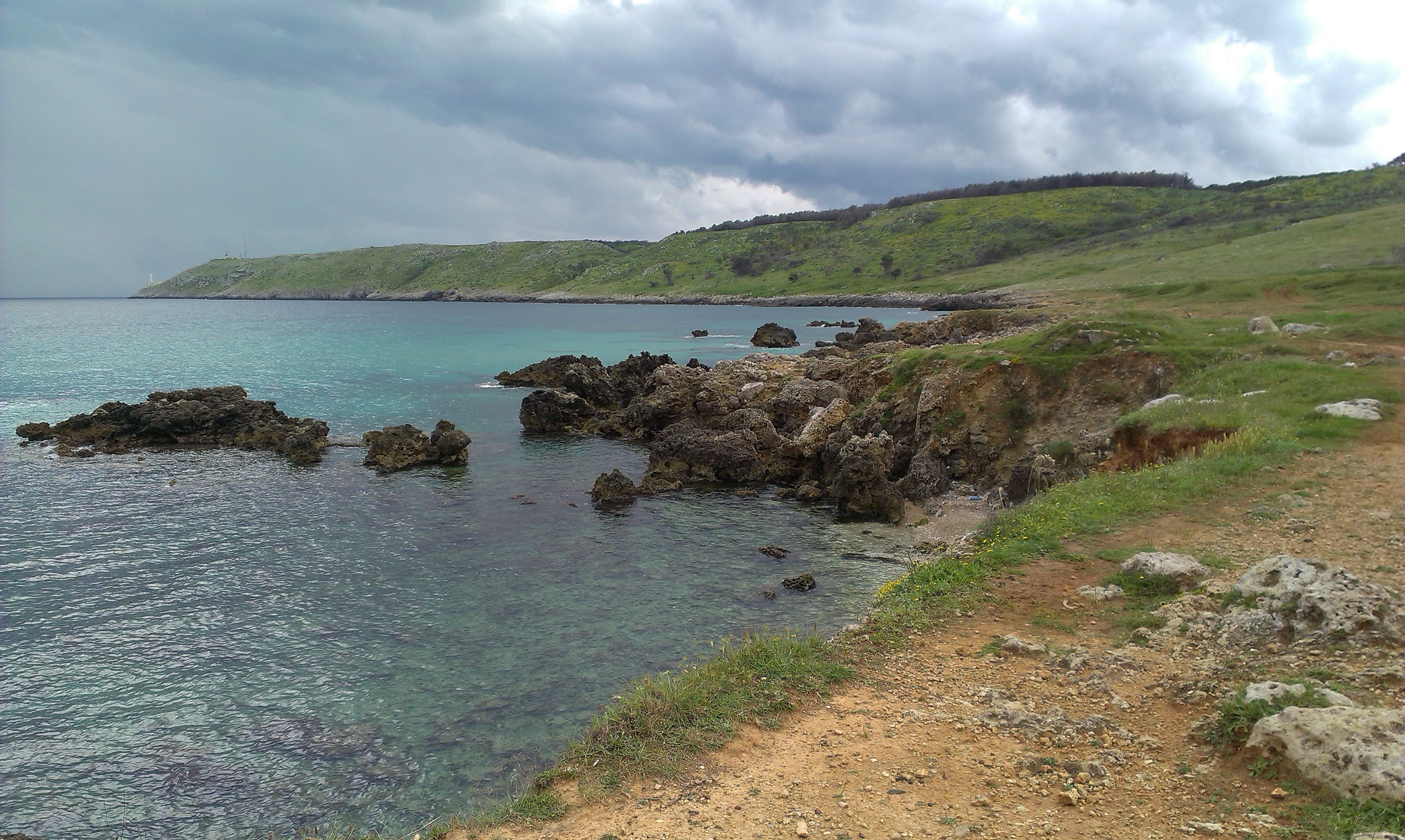
A part of the Regional Natural Coastal Park of "Costa Otranto Santa Maria di Leuca Bosco di Tricase"

The borders of the Regional Park includes 12 municipalities of Lecce province: Alessano, Andrano, Castrignano del Capo, Castro, Corsano, Diso, Gagliano del Capo, Ortelle, Otranto, Santa Cesarea Terme, Tiggiano and Tricase.

From a geological point of view the park is formed by a stratification which dates from the Late Cretaceous to the Quaternary periods.

The constitution of the park aims principally at safeguarding and the protecting the historic - architectonic heritage, the coastal system and the autocrathonous greenery, with particular attention to the Quercus macrolepis.

Additionally there are also three Site of Community Importance included in The Regional Coastal Park:

- The oak-trees Park of Castro.
- The wood of Tricase
- The wood "Le chiuse di Tiggiano "

=== The oak-trees Park of Castro ===
The park has a surface area of 4.5 hectares, part of the Regional Coastal Park. It is a protected area full of several bird species and vegetation. The holm oak is predominant, an evergreen tree that can reach the maximum height of 30 metres. Typical Mediterranean plants such as bay-tree, hawthorn, campanula pugliese, hedera and different types of orchids are also present. Between the park's woods there are several different species of particular birds, including owl, robin, nightingale and turtle doves. In the rocky part of the park there is a big canal which picks up water from the rain and is surrounded by dense and inaccessible vegetation.

=== The Wood of Tricase ===
The Wood of Tricase is part of The Regional Coastal Park. It is an area full of oak-trees and orchids. Regarding fauna, it is the area in which the monk seal, one of the rarest mammals in Europe, has been spotted.

=== The Wood "Le chiuse di Tiggiano" ===
The Wood of Tiggiano extends along the sloped of the hills that reach the sea. The area is mainly dominated by species of trees such as holm oaks, and in the more precipitous rocky areas the most prevalent are flowers such as the campanula pugliese, the alyssum and the scrofularia pugliese.

== Gallery ==
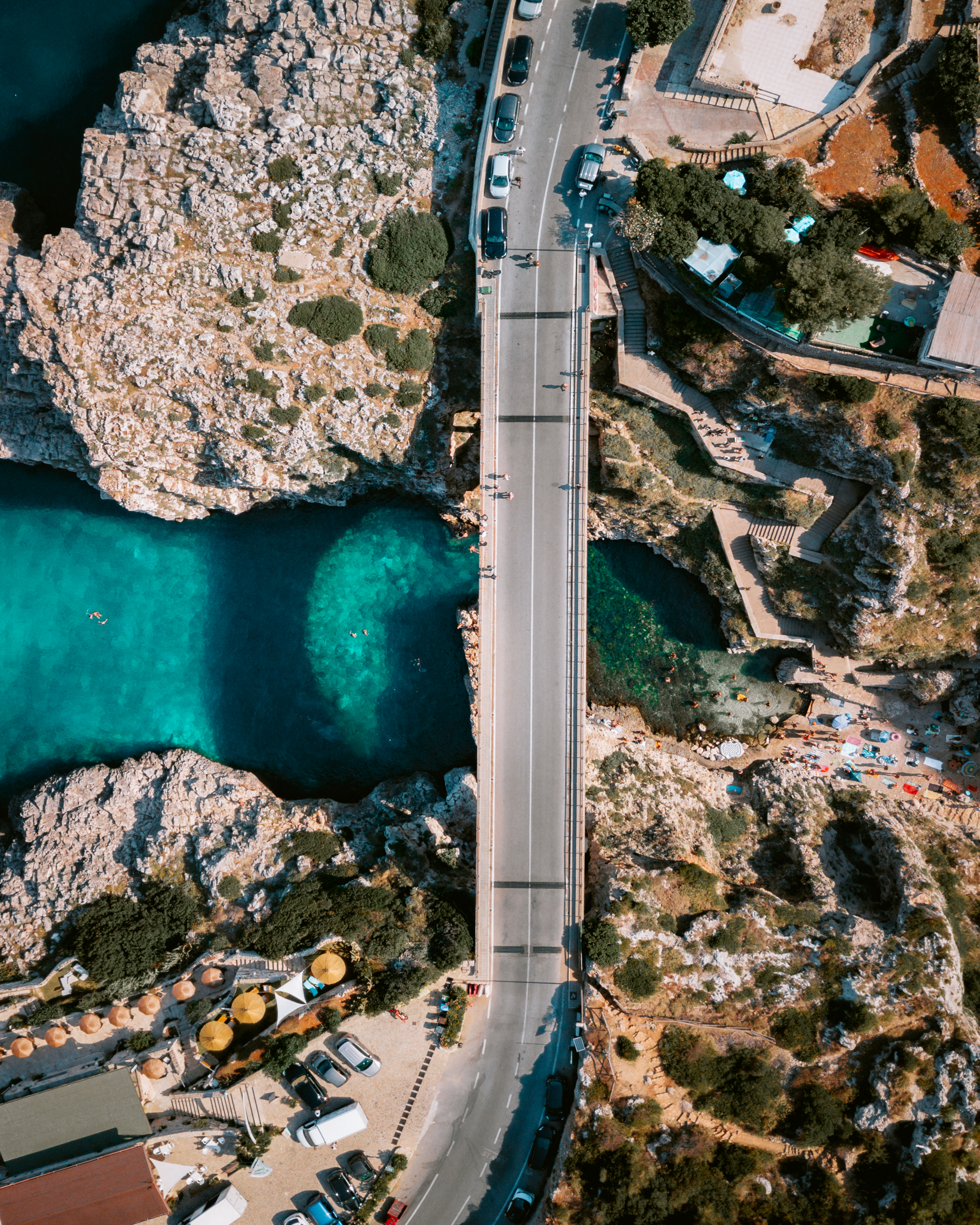
Panoramic view of Ponte del Ciolo (Ciolo's Bridge)

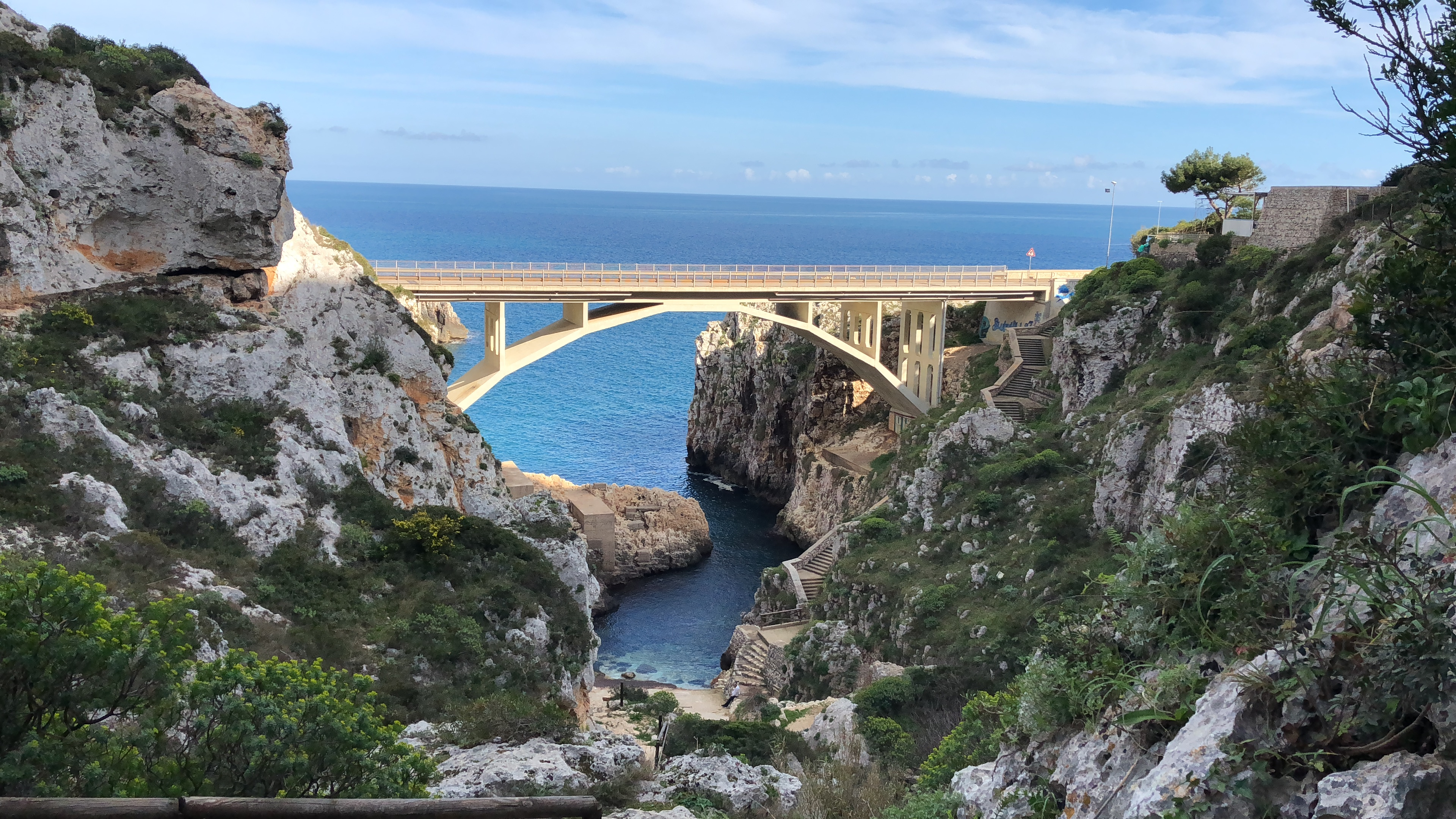
Frame from the inside of the Ciolo canyon

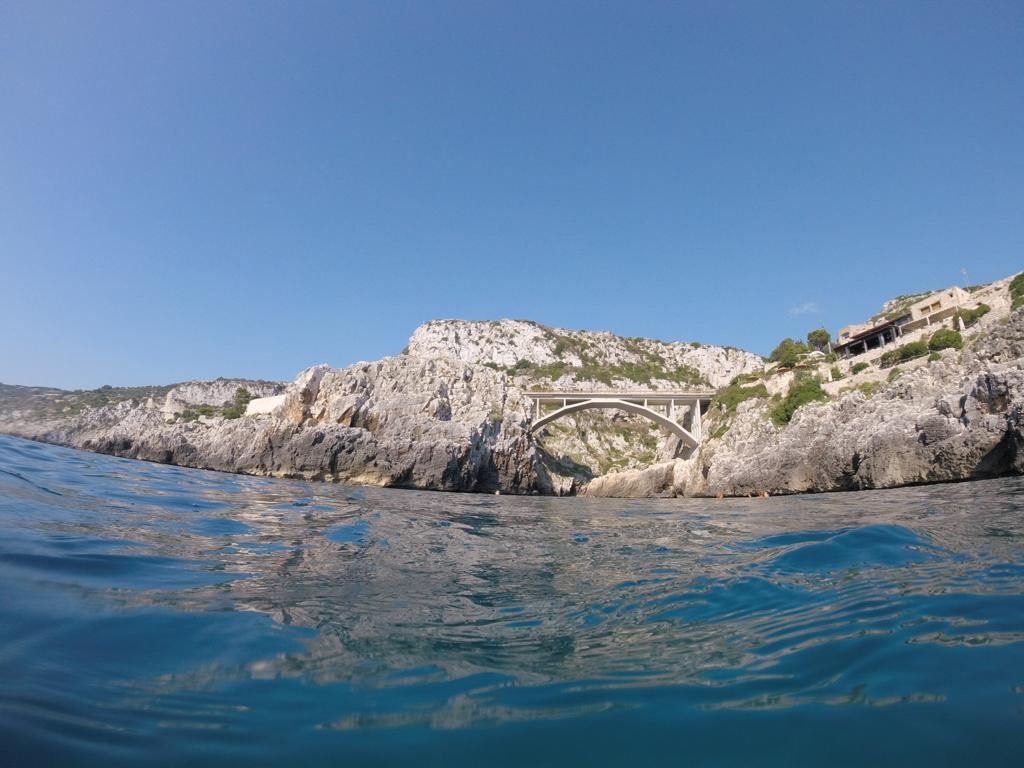
View of the Ciolo canyon from the Adriatic Sea

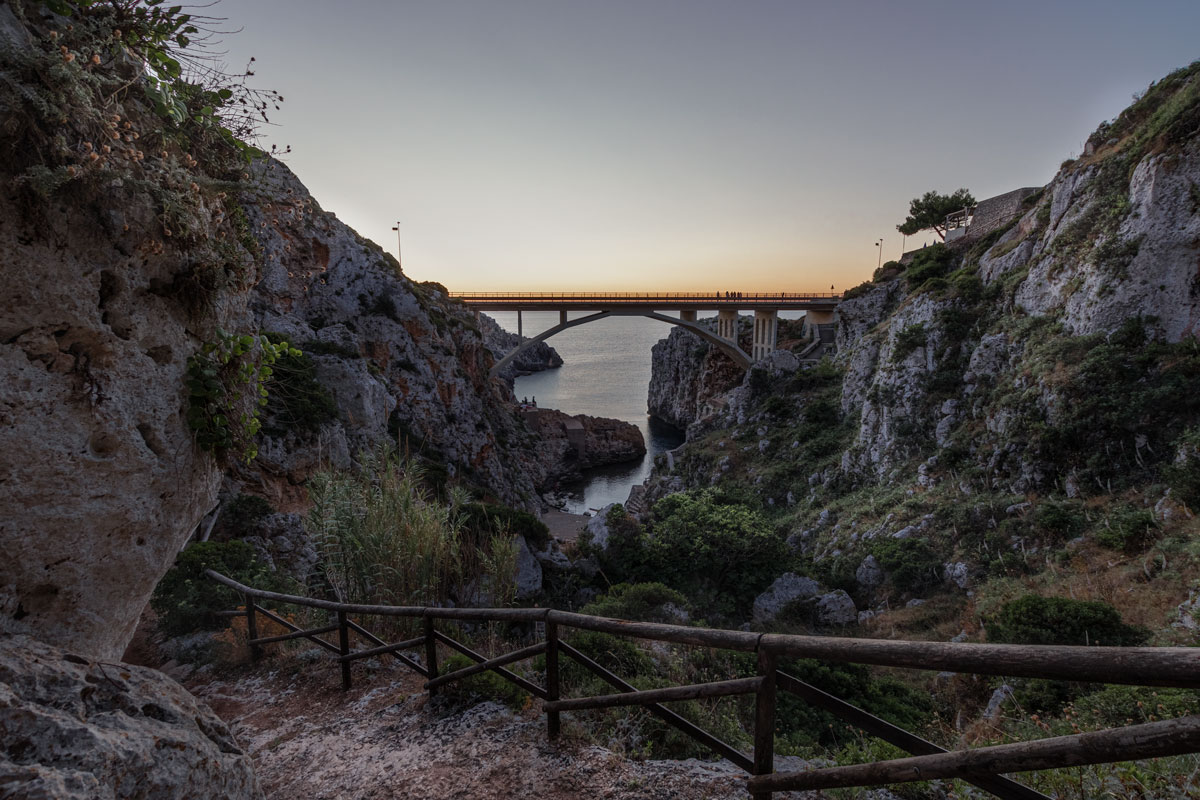
View of the Ponte del Ciolo (Ciolo's Bridge)

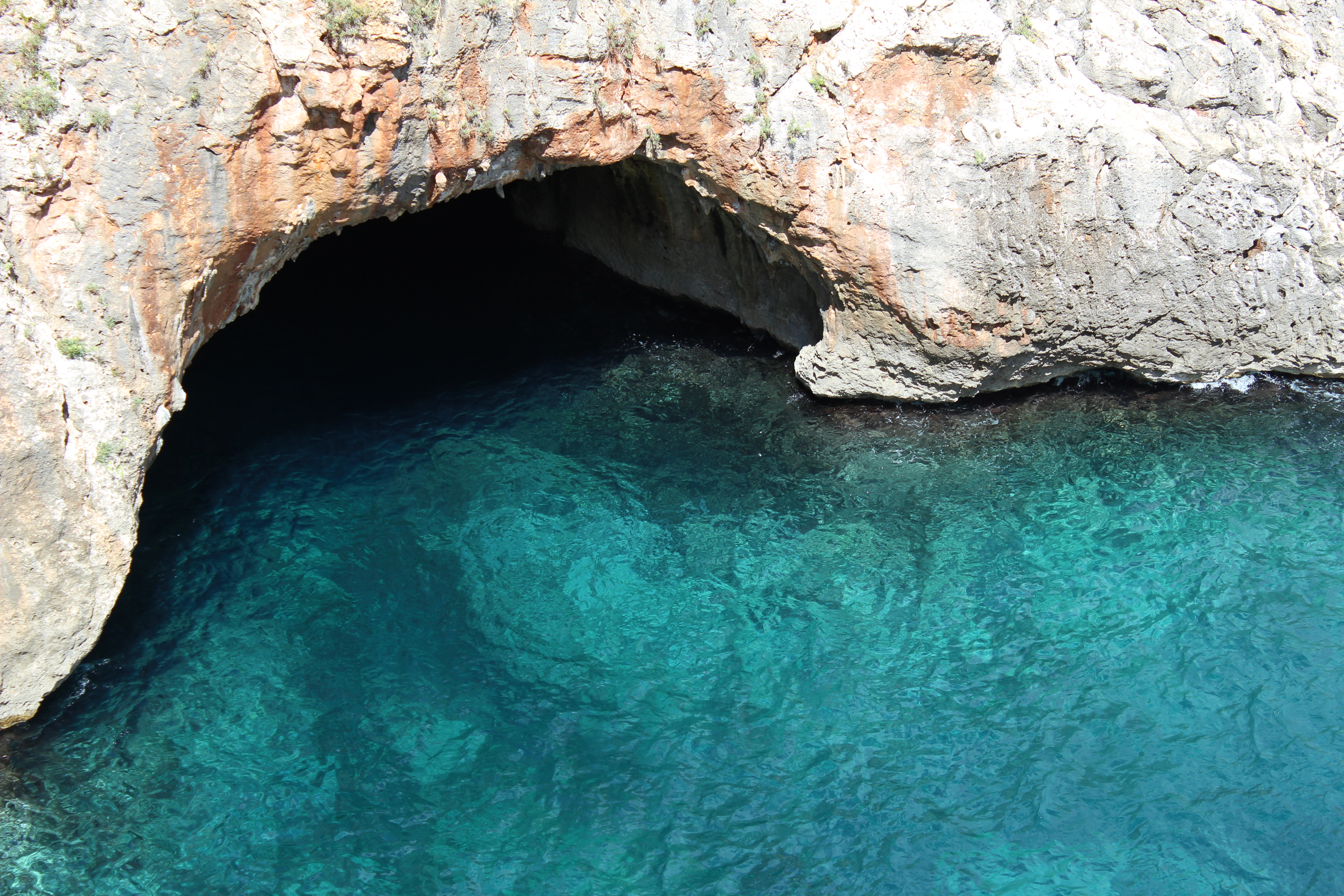
Grotta Grande del Ciolo

== See also ==
- Apulia
- Province of Lecce
