= Angelo Buccarello =

Italian Catholic priest (1942–2026)

The Reverend Angelo Buccarello OSST
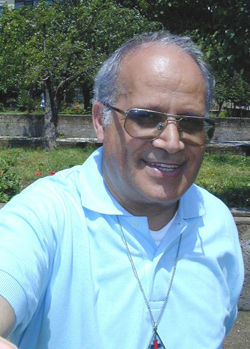
- Angelo Buccarello
- Born: 12 May 1942; Castrignano del Capo (Leuca), Italy
- Died: 16 July 2026 (aged 84)

Ecclesiastical career
- Church: Roman Catholic
- Ordained: 28 June 1968

Angelo Buccarello, OSST (12 May 1942 – 16 July 2026) was an Italian Catholic priest and member of the Trinitarians known for his founding of the Catholic Chaplaincy for Prisons.

== Background ==
Buccarello was born in Castrignano del Capo, a small town in southern Italy, on 12 May 1942.

After primary and junior secondary school, he entered the Trinitarian Order (OSST) on 17 November 1955. He entered the novitiate in 1959 and then pursued his studies: senior secondary school in Livorno, Italy, philosophy at the College of St. Crisogonus in Rome, and theology at the Pontifical Urbaniana University in Rome.

He was ordained to the priesthood on 28 June 1968. On 11 October 1969, he was assigned to a mission in Madagascar.

His missionary work consisted mostly in welcoming people, helping them, evangelizing them, educating them in the faith, often by touring and visiting the fifty or so Christian communities in the country.

In 1981, he was called to Antananarivo to train the young Trinitarian brothers of Madagascar. In 1983, the Cardinal named him Chaplain of the prisons of Antananarivo.

Buccarello died on 16 July 2026, at the age of 84.

== Work ==
Buccarello was named Catholic Chaplain for the Prisons of Madagascar. As a result, he founded the social programme of the ACP (Catholic Chaplaincy for Prisons). The ACP, whose centre is called Tonga Soa, has performed a service to detainees and their families. The ACP is at present recognized by the Malagasy State as an ONG, of which Fr. Angelo was the founding president.

He worked in the prison domain with the ACP until his departure from Madagascar in 2001.

With the ACP, his aim was to help his brother prisoners, especially the poorest, in their vital and legal needs, as well as in helping them regain their dignity, their goodness, their vocation.

The ACP team provides:

- Food services
- Medical aid
- Social assistance
- Legal aid
- Rehabilitation for freed prisoners
- Production of coal from refuse.

Buccarello opened centres for children of detainees in Amboditsiry, Andranobevava, Analamahitsy, Fenomanana, Anjiro, as well as for the most undernourished detainees of Androndra.

After 32 years in Madagascar, of which 20 in Antananarivo, he was elected and named general Counsellor of the Trinitarian Order, in July 2001, in Rome.

He was later named President of the Trinitarian International Solidarity, an organism with the aim of liberation.

== Decorations ==
In December 1996, Fr. Angelo received the prize for Human Rights from the French President Jacques Chirac.

Buccarello was named member of the Commission Nationale Malgache for Human Rights, and was decorated Knight and Officer of the Ordre National Malgache.

His exploit: Madagascar was the only country in the world which, on the occasion of the Jubilee Year 2000, year of reconciliation and of debt remission, freed some 3,000 prisoners, as a gesture of clemency, thanks to the faith and tenacity of Fr. Angelo and of the group Rêve 2000 which he had formed, as well as the response of the Bishops and of the Government.
