= Gagliano del Capo =

- Comune
- Comune di Gagliano del Capo
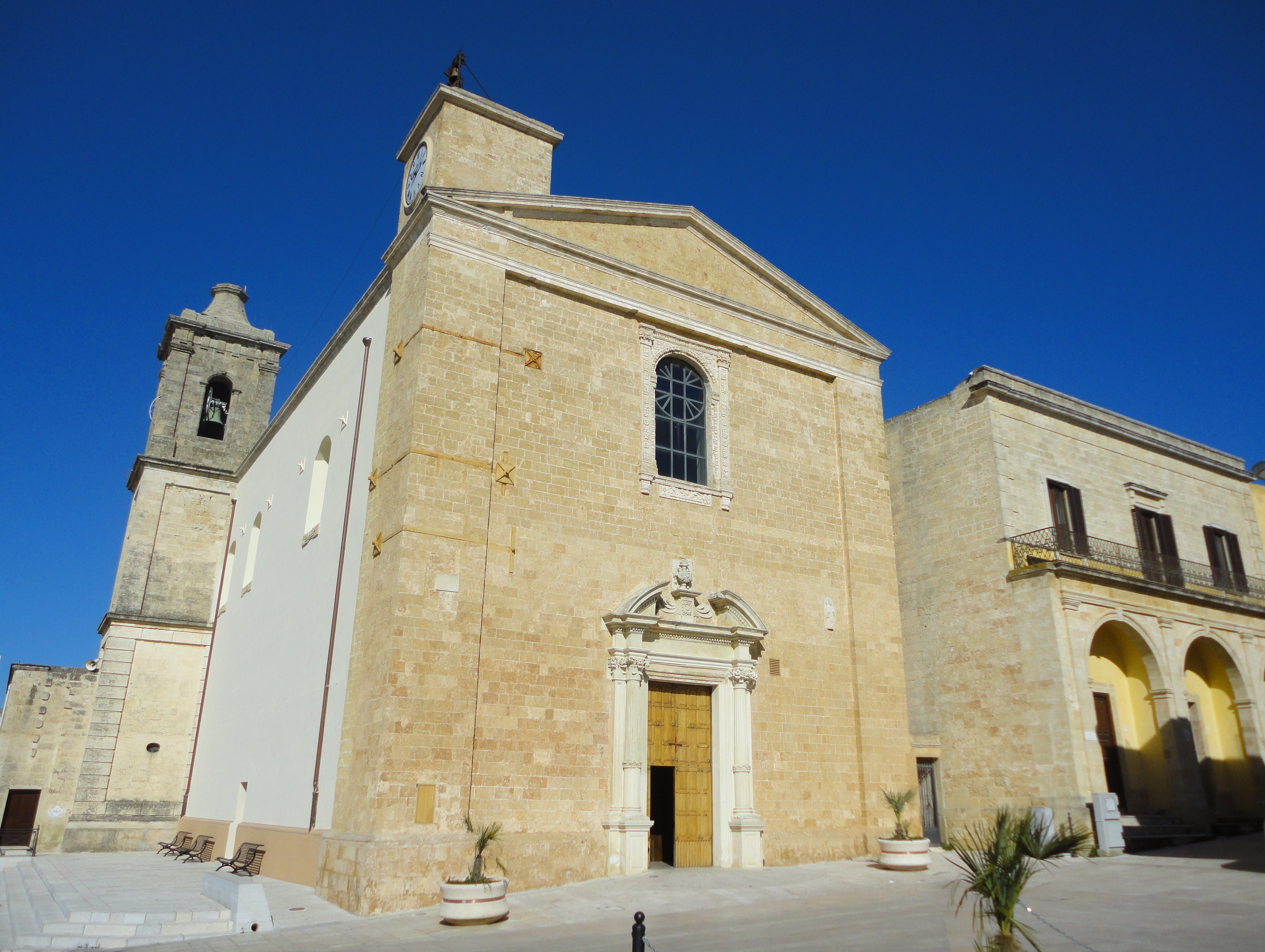
- Mother church

- Coat of arms

- Location within Italy Location within Apulia
- Coordinates: 39°50′35″N 18°22′10″E
- Country: Italy
- Region: Apulia
- Province: Lecce (LE)
- Frazioni: Arigliano and San Dana

Government
  - Mayor: Gianfranco Melcarne

Area
  - Total: 16.6 km^{2} (6.4 sq mi)
- Elevation: 144 m (472 ft)

Population (1 January 2021)
  - Total: 4,906
  - Density: 296/km^{2} (765/sq mi)
- Demonym: Gaglianesi
- Time zone: UTC+1 (CET)
  - Summer (DST): UTC+2 (CEST)
- Postal code: 73034
- Dialing code: 0833
- ISTAT code: 075028
- Patron saint: Saint Roch
- Saint day: August 16
- Website: Official website

Gagliano del Capo (Salentino: Gajànu) is an Italian comune situated in the province of Lecce, the southernmost one of Apulia.

In its territory is located Ciolo, a rocky cove that is part of the Regional Natural Coastal Park of "Costa Otranto-Santa Maria di Leuca e Bosco di Tricase".
