= Depressa =

Coordinates: 39°58′N 18°22′E

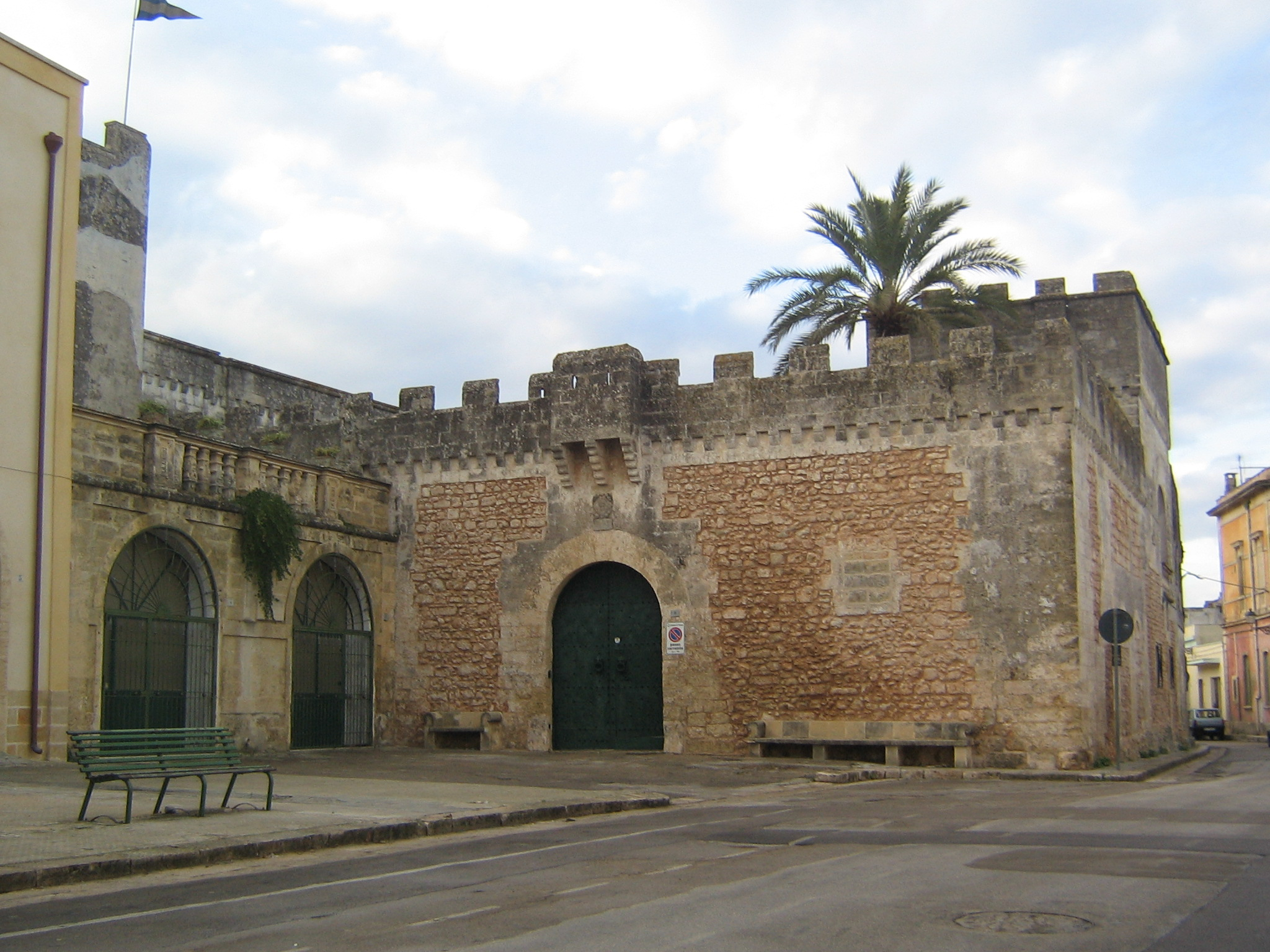
The castle, parts of which date to the 14th century, was substantially rebuilt in the 16th century. It is Depressa's oldest monument.

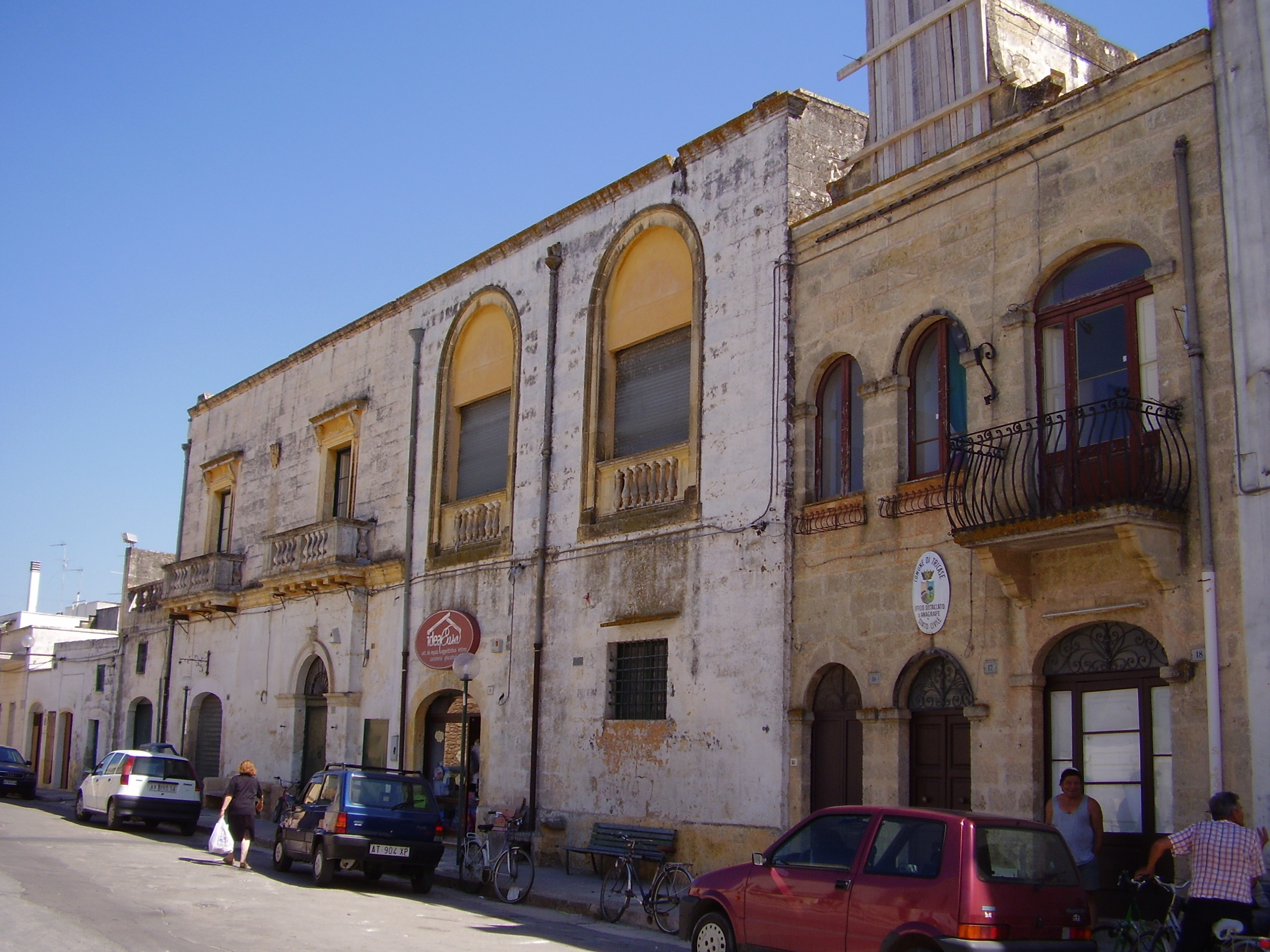
Piazza Castello.

Depressa, population 1,541, is a village or small town in the Salento traditional region of south-east Italy. Administratively it counts as a frazione of the comune of Tricase, a municipality of the Province of Lecce, Apulia.

The castle of Depressa is a property of Anglo-Italian Winspeare noble family.

== Transportation ==
The nearest international airports are those of Brindisi and Bari. By road, Tricase can be reached by a 2-lane freeway from Bari.

== See also ==
- Lecce
- Magna Grecia
- Grecìa Salentina
