= Cardinale Giovanni Panico General Hospital =

Italian hospital

Geography
- Location: Tricase, Apulia, Italy
- Coordinates: 39°56′10″N 18°21′23″E

Organisation
- Care system: Government
- Type: District General, Teaching

Services
- Emergency department: Level I Trauma Centre
- Beds: 410

History
- Opened: October 1, 1967

Links
- Website: www.piafondazionepanico.it

Cardinale Giovanni Panico General Hospital is a district general hospital in Tricase, Italy that opened in October 1967.

== History ==
The hospital was officially opened in 1967 by the International Institute of Marcelline Sisters. The construction of the hospital was commissioned by Cardinale Giovanni Panico, and taken over by the Marcelline Sisters following his death, as he requested.

The first brick was laid in 1963 by Giuseppe Zocco. After the foundation was built, the chief of the department of surgery of the Nardò civil hospital halted the construction because the project had not met his high expectations at the time. Six months later construction resumed and the hospital was opened on 1 October 1967, treating its first patients a week later.

Some years later, the hospital became a regional teaching hospital and one of the most important religious hospitals in Europe. In the following years, the hospital was enlarged and more wards were added.

Today, Cardinale Panico Hospital is a reference point for neurological disorders, hematology, pediatric oncology, and rare diseases.
