= Capo Santa Maria di Leuca Lighthouse =

Lighthouse in Italy

Capo Santa Maria di Leuca
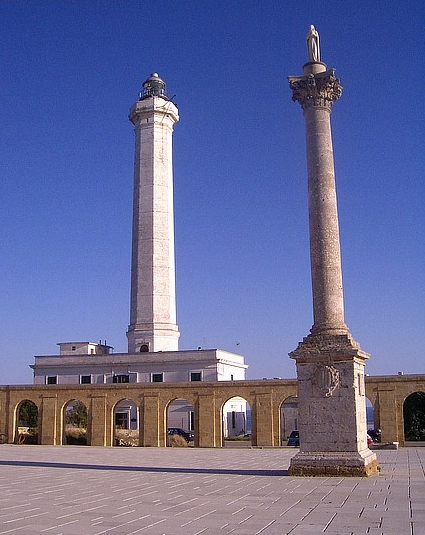
- The lighthouse of Santa Maria di Leuca
- Location: Santa Maria di Leuca; Apulia; Italy
- Coordinates: 39°47′45″N 18°22′06″E

Tower
- Constructed: 1866
- Foundation: concrete base
- Construction: brick tower
- Height: 48 metres (157 ft)
- Shape: octagonal prism tower with balcony and lantern atop a 2-storey keeper’s house
- Markings: white tower
- Operator: Marina Militare

Light
- Focal height: 102 metres (335 ft)
- Lens: first order Fresnel Lens (removed 1954), Type OR T6 (current)
- Light source: main power
- Intensity: main: AL 1000 W reserve: MAXI HALO 60
- Range: main: 24 nautical miles (44 km; 28 mi) reserve: 10 nautical miles (19 km; 12 mi)
- Characteristic: Fl (3) W 15s. Oc R 4s. (to east)
- Italy no.: 3590 E.F.

Santa Maria di Leuca lighthouse is an active light located at the extremity of Santa Maria di Leuca nearby the same name Sanctuary.

== Description ==
The lighthouse was built in 1864 on project by Achille Rossi and was lit for the first time on September 6, 1866. The tower, built in bricks, has an hexagonal prism shape with balcony and lantern atop a two-storey keeper's house. It has a height of 47 metres (154 ft), and is placed at 102 metres (335 ft) above sea level. The lantern has a diameter of 3 metres (9.8 ft) and emits three white flashes in a 15 seconds period visible up to 24 nautical miles (44 km; 28 mi) while a red occulting light every 4 seconds is shown over the shoal to the east. The light is operated by the Lighthouses Service of Marina Militare identified by the code number 3388 E.F.

== See also ==
- List of lighthouses in Italy
