= Santa Maria di Leuca =

Frazione of Italy

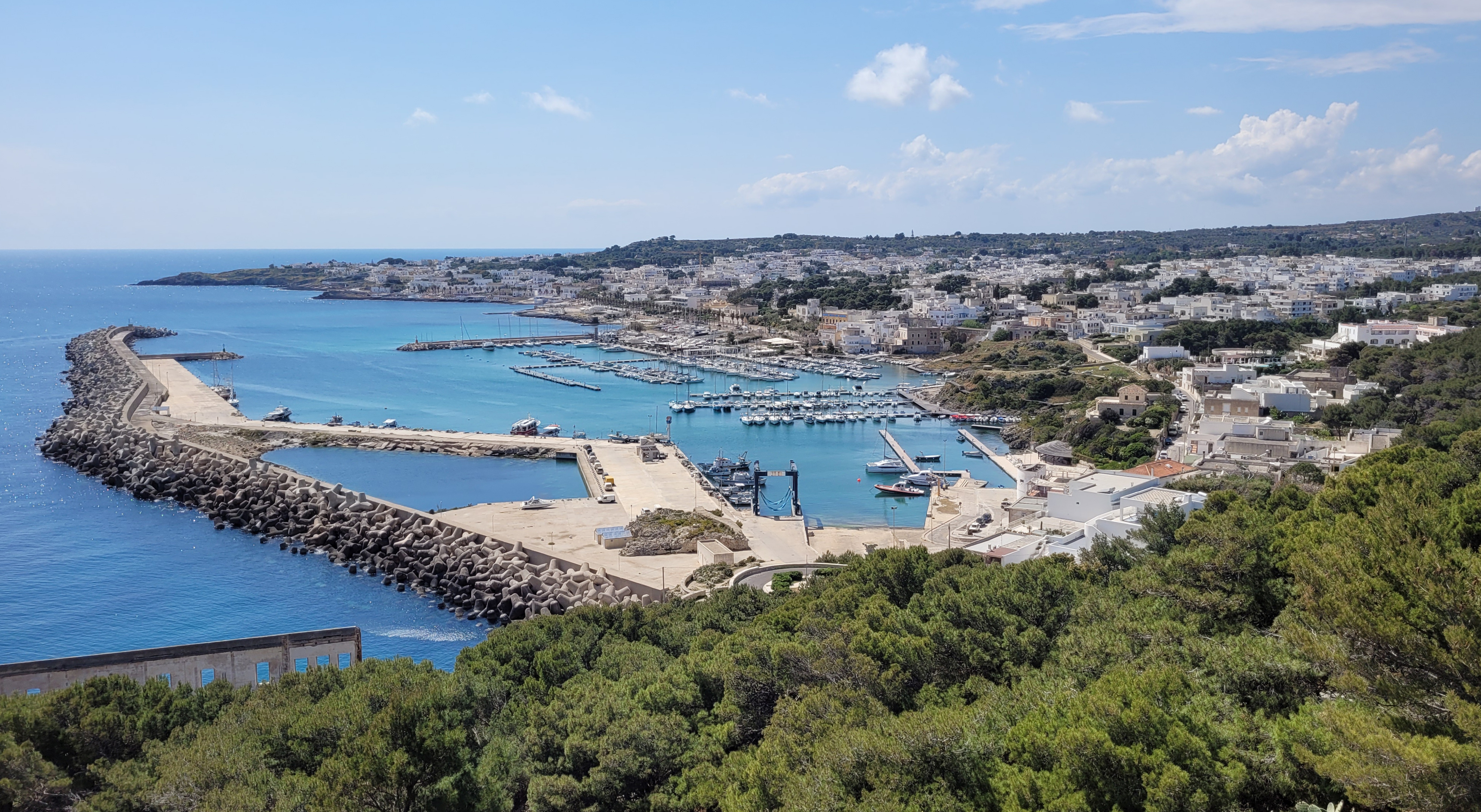
View of Santa Maria di Leuca

Santa Maria di Leuca, often spelled simply Leuca is a frazione of the comune of Castrignano del Capo, in the Salento peninsula (Apulia), southern Italy. A part of the town once belonged to the comune of Gagliano del Capo. It is found in the very end of the Salento peninsula.

The territory between Otranto and Santa Maria di Leuca has become a Regional Natural Coastal Park of "Costa Otranto - Santa Maria di Leuca e Bosco di Tricase". In this area, in the comune of Gagliano Del Capo, is located Ciolo.

== Description ==
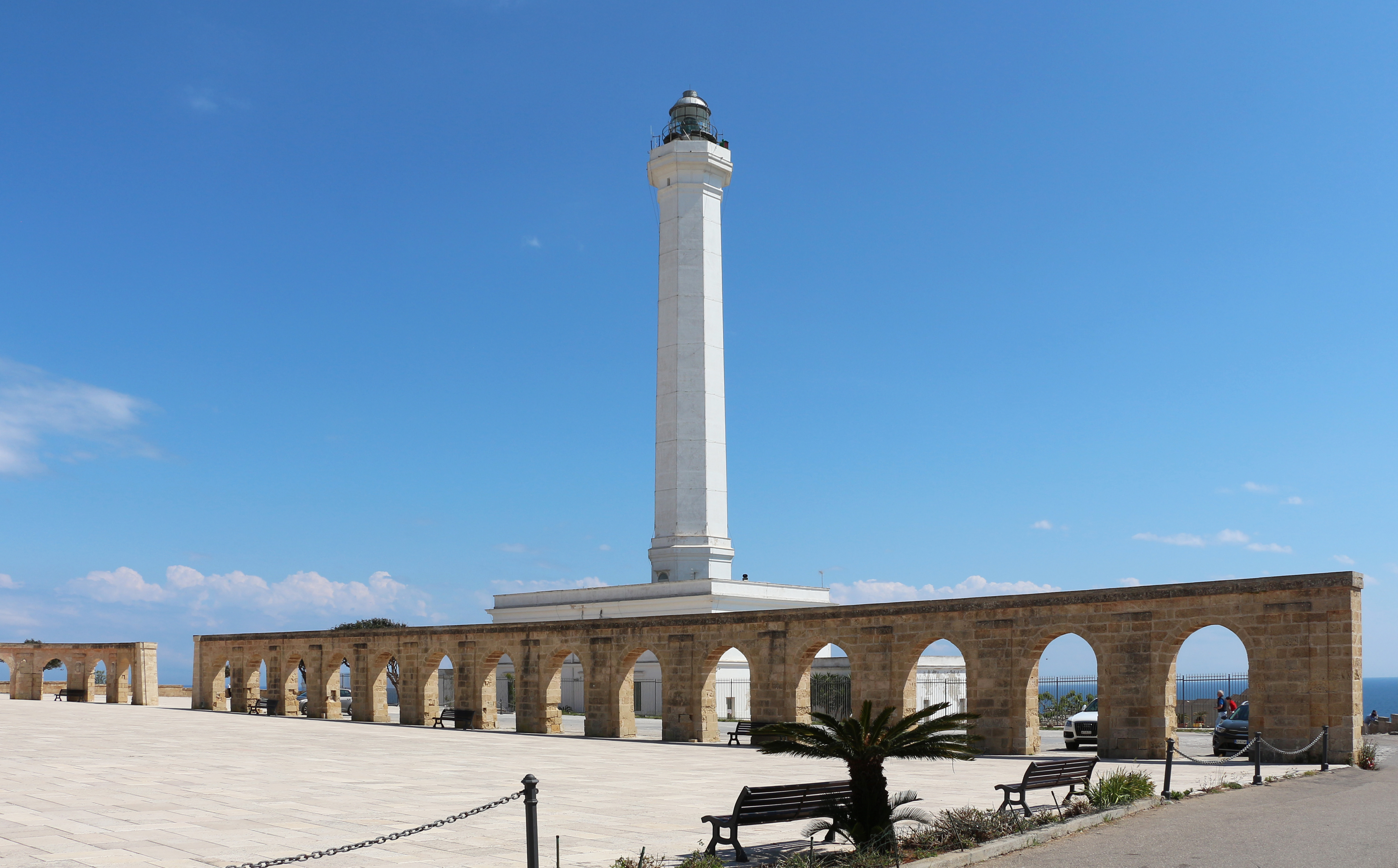
Santa Maria di Leuca Lighthouse

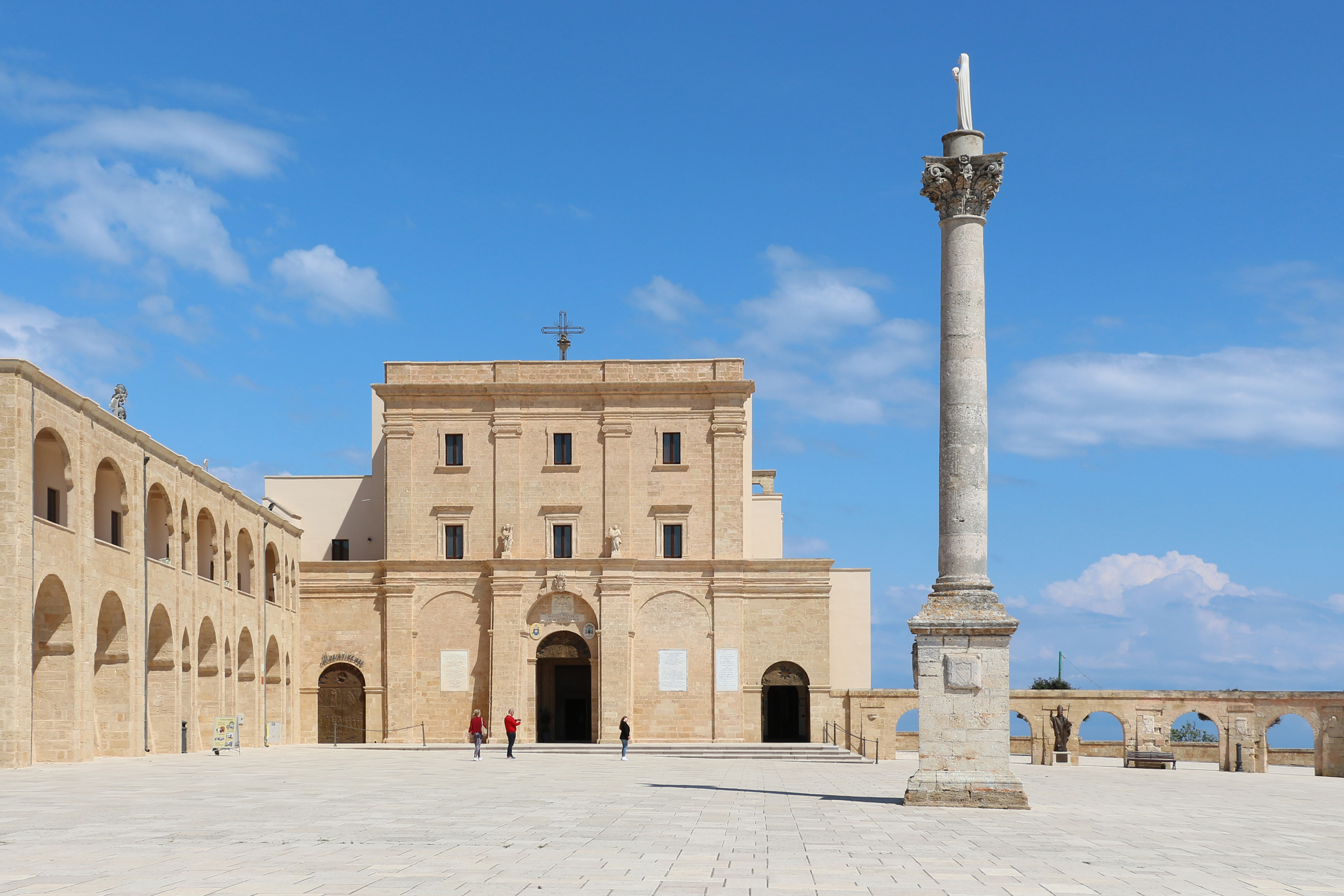
Basilica Santa Maria de finibus terrae

Santa Maria di Leuca is famous for its iconic lighthouse. With its height of 47 metres, and position at 102 metres above sea level, is the second most important lighthouse in Italy, after Genova. Next to the lighthouse is the large Sanctuary, or Basilica, De Finibus Terrae ("End of the Land", 1720–1755), built to commemorate the passage of St. Peter here during his travel to Italy. It is devoted to Saint Mary (from whom the town gets the name Santa Maria di Leuca). It lies on the former site of a Greek temple dedicated to Athena. The edifice has a fortified structure, and during its existence it sustained several assaults by Algerian pirates. At the same site, a Corinthian column was erected in 1939 to celebrate the construction of the Apulian Aqueduct (Acquedotto Pugliese). The basilica is connected to the port through a 284-step staircase.

Santa Maria di Leuca is also frequently visited by tourists from all over the world including Italy itself for its pristine beaches and beautiful Mediterranean coast.

Punta Meliso promontory (the ancient Promontorium lapygium or Sallentinum) is the southeastern extremity of Italy — traditionally considered the lowest point of the geographical "heel" of Italian peninsula, as well as the meeting point of the waters from the Adriatic Sea and the Ionian Sea. But Leuca is a bay so there's another promontory called Punta Ristola challenging this geographical particularity. According to Google Earth, Punta Ristola, at 39° 47′ 22.96″ N, is approximately 440 meters south of Punta Meliso, at 39° 47′ 37.73″ N.

After World War II the town hosted Jewish Holocaust survivors for two years (1946–1948), giving them warm hospitality.

Since October 2006 its territory is part of the Regional Park "Costa Otranto - Santa Maria di Leuca e Bosco di Tricase". Santa Maria di Leuca's littoral is marked by numerous grottoes with Latin and Greek inscriptions. Also famous are the 19th century patrician villas (c. 43 in number).

Not far off Punta Ristola, at c. 85 m of depth, lies the shipwreck of the Italian submarine Pietro Micca, sunk during World War II with its crew of 58 men.

== Legend ==
Prehistoric remains have been found in some the about 66 caves of the coast of Leuca, like Grotta Porcinara and Grotta del Diavolo.

According to Luigi Tasselli (17th century) the town takes its name from "Leucasia", a white beautiful mermaid (from Ancient Greek λευκός 'white, bright') who conquered sailors and farmers by her charming voice.

Santa Maria di Leuca was founded in fact in the early 1st century AD by some monks, after Saint Peter's passage. A cross was built in his honor and after some restructurings, still be there. According to a later legend, Virgin Mary once saved some boats from a storm, and her name was added to that of Leuca.

== Climate ==
Santa Maria di Leuca has a Mediterranean climate (Köppen: Csa).

Climate data for Santa Maria di Leuca (1991–2020)
Month	Jan	Feb	Mar	Apr	May	Jun	Jul	Aug	Sep	Oct	Nov	Dec	Year
Record high °C (°F)	20.2 (68.4)	19.0 (66.2)	21.6 (70.9)	26.8 (80.2)	30.6 (87.1)	35.8 (96.4)	38.6 (101.5)	38.6 (101.5)	34.0 (93.2)	29.2 (84.6)	23.0 (73.4)	19.0 (66.2)	38.6 (101.5)
Mean daily maximum °C (°F)	12.4 (54.3)	12.6 (54.7)	14.3 (57.7)	17.0 (62.6)	21.4 (70.5)	26.1 (79.0)	29.6 (85.3)	29.6 (85.3)	25.5 (77.9)	21.4 (70.5)	17.4 (63.3)	13.6 (56.5)	20.1 (68.2)
Daily mean °C (°F)	10.0 (50.0)	10.1 (50.2)	11.8 (53.2)	14.4 (57.9)	18.5 (65.3)	22.9 (73.2)	25.8 (78.4)	26.3 (79.3)	22.6 (72.7)	18.8 (65.8)	15.0 (59.0)	11.8 (53.2)	17.3 (63.1)
Mean daily minimum °C (°F)	7.8 (46.0)	7.6 (45.7)	9.3 (48.7)	11.7 (53.1)	15.6 (60.1)	19.8 (67.6)	22.5 (72.5)	23.0 (73.4)	19.7 (67.5)	16.2 (61.2)	12.7 (54.9)	9.1 (48.4)	14.6 (58.3)
Record low °C (°F)	−1.6 (29.1)	−2.0 (28.4)	0.8 (33.4)	0.0 (32.0)	8.8 (47.8)	12.6 (54.7)	15.6 (60.1)	15.6 (60.1)	12.8 (55.0)	8.2 (46.8)	2.8 (37.0)	−2.8 (27.0)	−2.8 (27.0)
Average precipitation mm (inches)	65.5 (2.58)	48.4 (1.91)	55.5 (2.19)	42.8 (1.69)	31.5 (1.24)	13.2 (0.52)	9.6 (0.38)	17.2 (0.68)	50.8 (2.00)	86.8 (3.42)	110.1 (4.33)	80.6 (3.17)	611.8 (24.09)
Average precipitation days (≥ 1.0 mm)	7.2	5.8	6.7	5.4	4.1	1.9	1.3	1.6	4.6	5.9	8.5	8.0	61.1
Average relative humidity (%)	76.4	74.9	74.8	73.9	71.3	67.8	65.3	67.1	71.4	75.8	77.1	76.1	72.7
Average dew point °C (°F)	5.5 (41.9)	4.4 (39.9)	6.6 (43.9)	8.5 (47.3)	12.7 (54.9)	15.6 (60.1)	17.2 (63.0)	18.3 (64.9)	16.6 (61.9)	13.5 (56.3)	9.9 (49.8)	6.5 (43.7)	11.3 (52.3)
Mean monthly sunshine hours	166.8	169.4	222.0	238.2	291.1	327.6	360.2	333.3	256.5	218.2	167.1	152.5	2,902.9
Source: NOAA, (Dew Point 1981-2010)

== See also ==
- Salento
- Castrignano del Capo
- Capo Santa Maria di Leuca Lighthouse

== Gallery ==
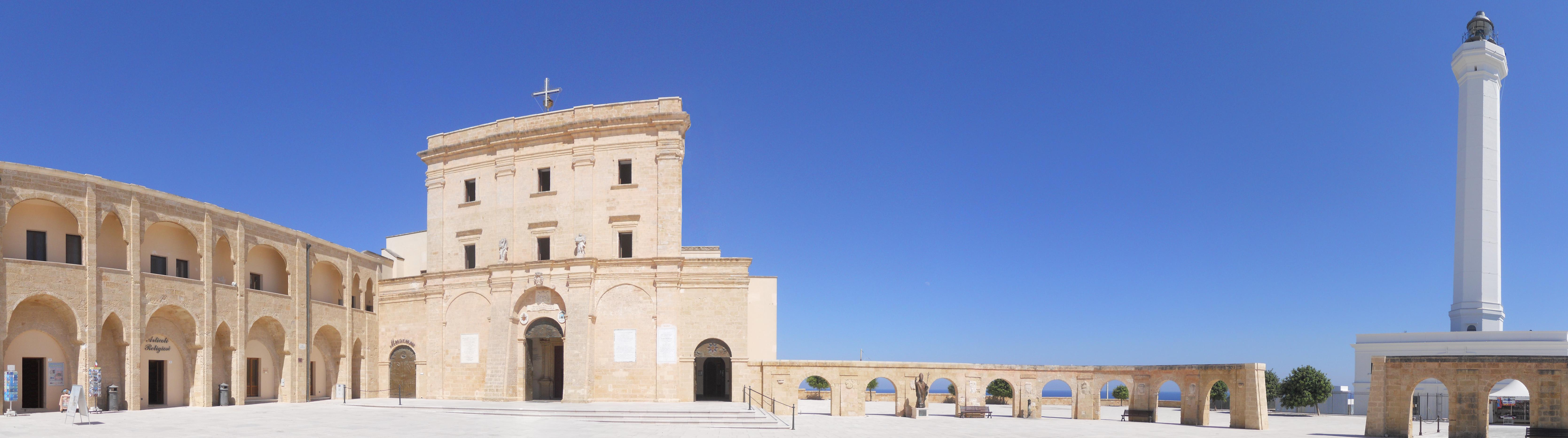
The Sanctuary and the lighthouse

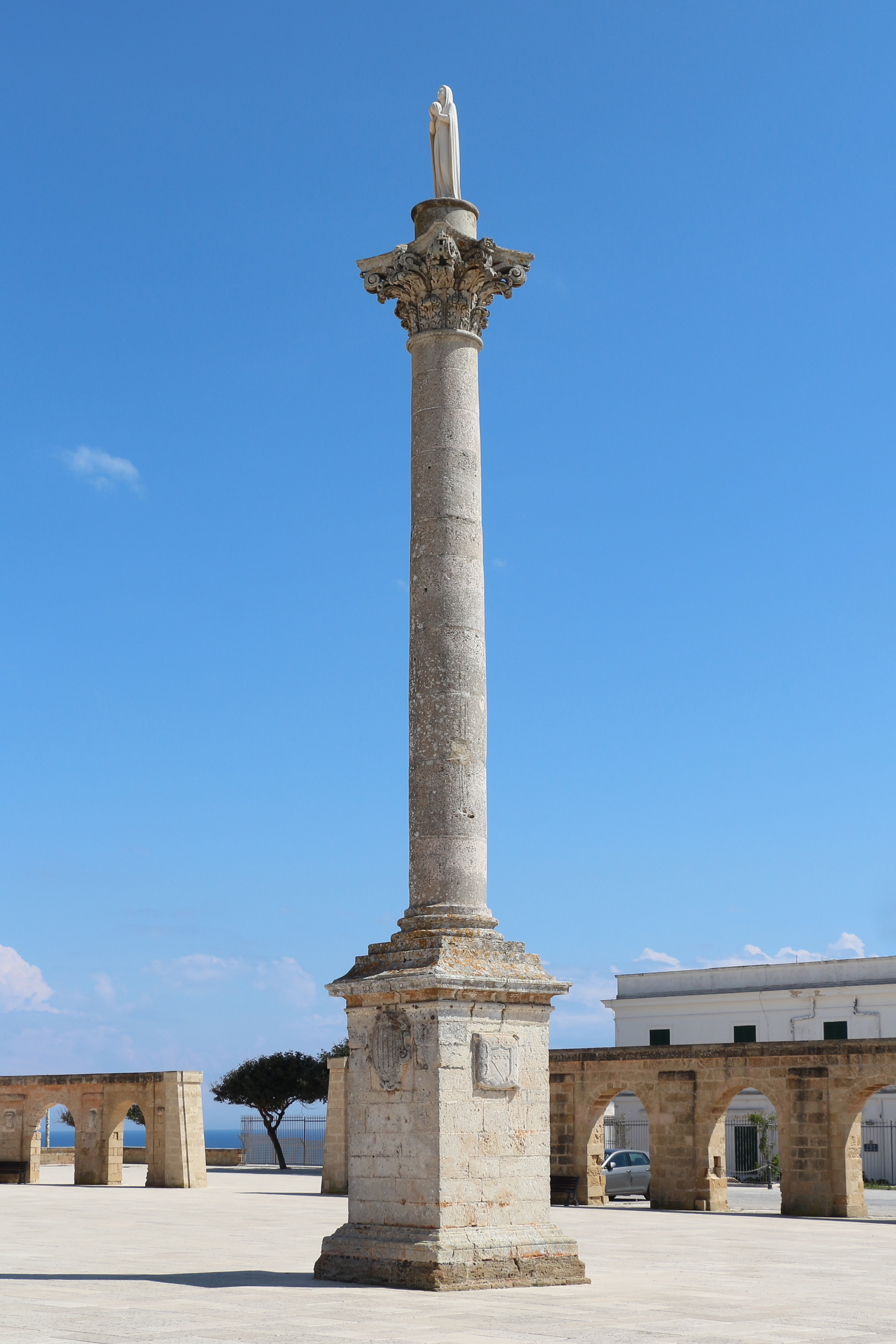
Statue of Santa Maria di Leuca

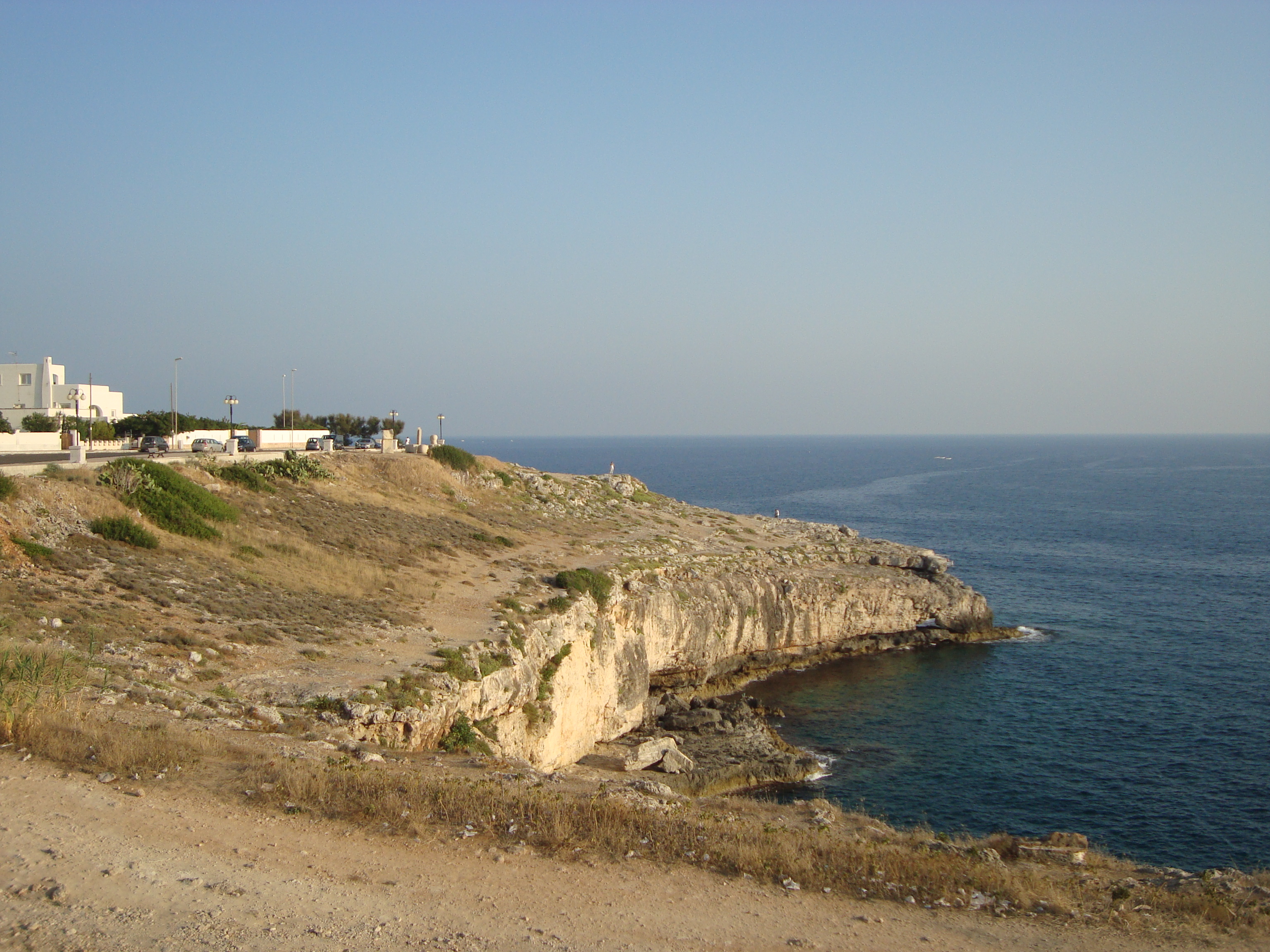
Punta Ristola

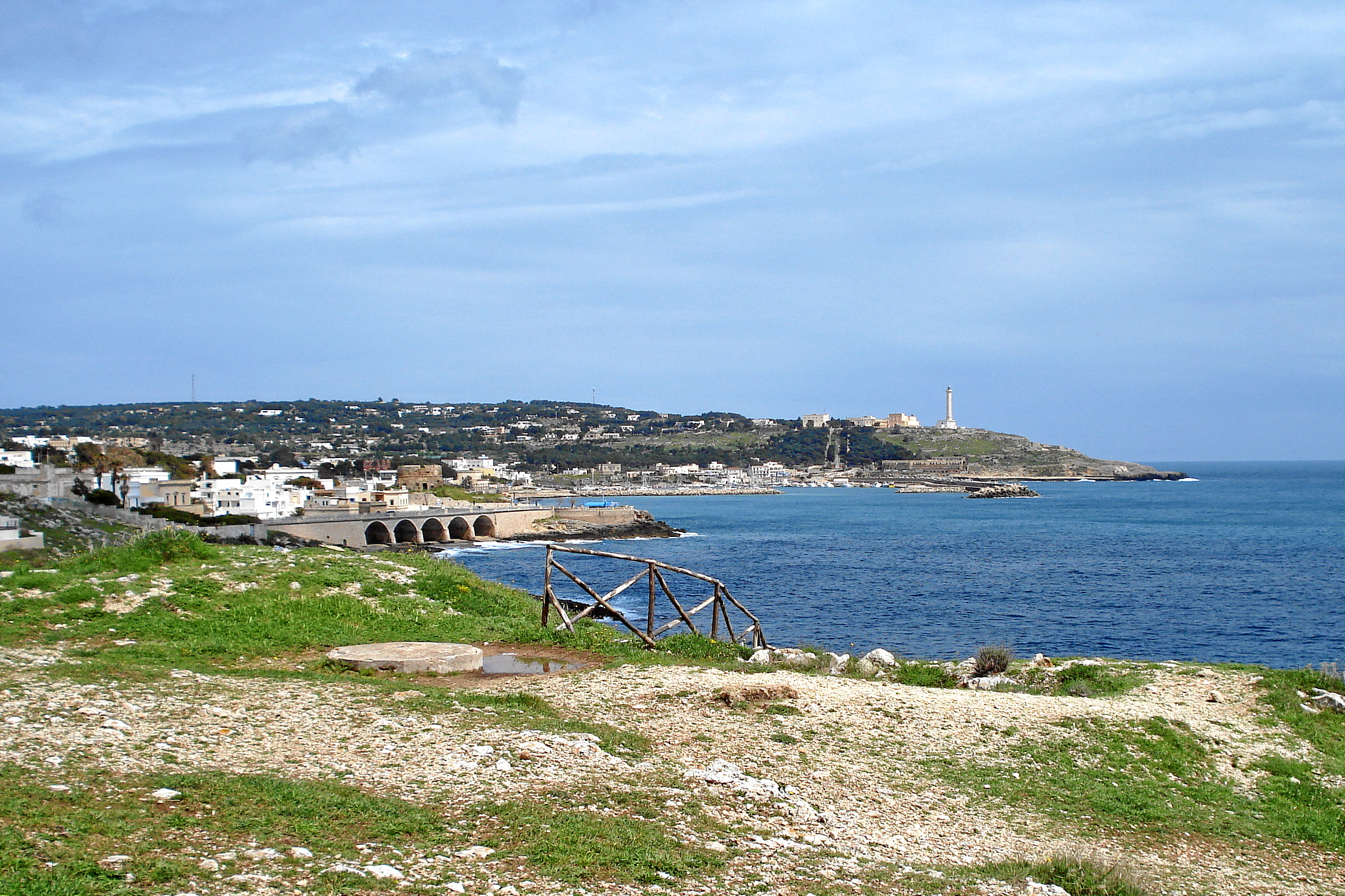
Santa Maria di Leuca from Punta Ristola

== Bibliography ==
- Luigi Tasselli, Antichità di Leuca (Lecce 1693, 1859).
- Antonio Romano, Guida alle grotte e caverne di Leuca (Congedo ed. Galatina 1996)
- Antonio Caloro, Guida di Leuca (l'estremo Salento tra storia arte e natura), a c. di Mario Cazzato (Congedo editore, Galatina 1996)
- Michele Rosafio, Leuca Guerra e Navi (Ed. dell'Iride, Tricase 2000)
- Carlo Stasi, Leucasia (racconti, leggende e poesie di terra, di mare e d'amore...) (AGL, Presicce 1993, 1996, 2001). ISBN 88-87809-10-0
- Carlo Stasi, Leucàsia e Le Due Sorelle (Storie e leggende del Salento), Mancarella Ed., Cavallino, 2008, 2012). ISBN 978-88-903669-0-1,
- Carlo Stasi, Leucasia the Legend (Capone, Lecce 2022) with English translation parallel test. ISBN 9788883492730
