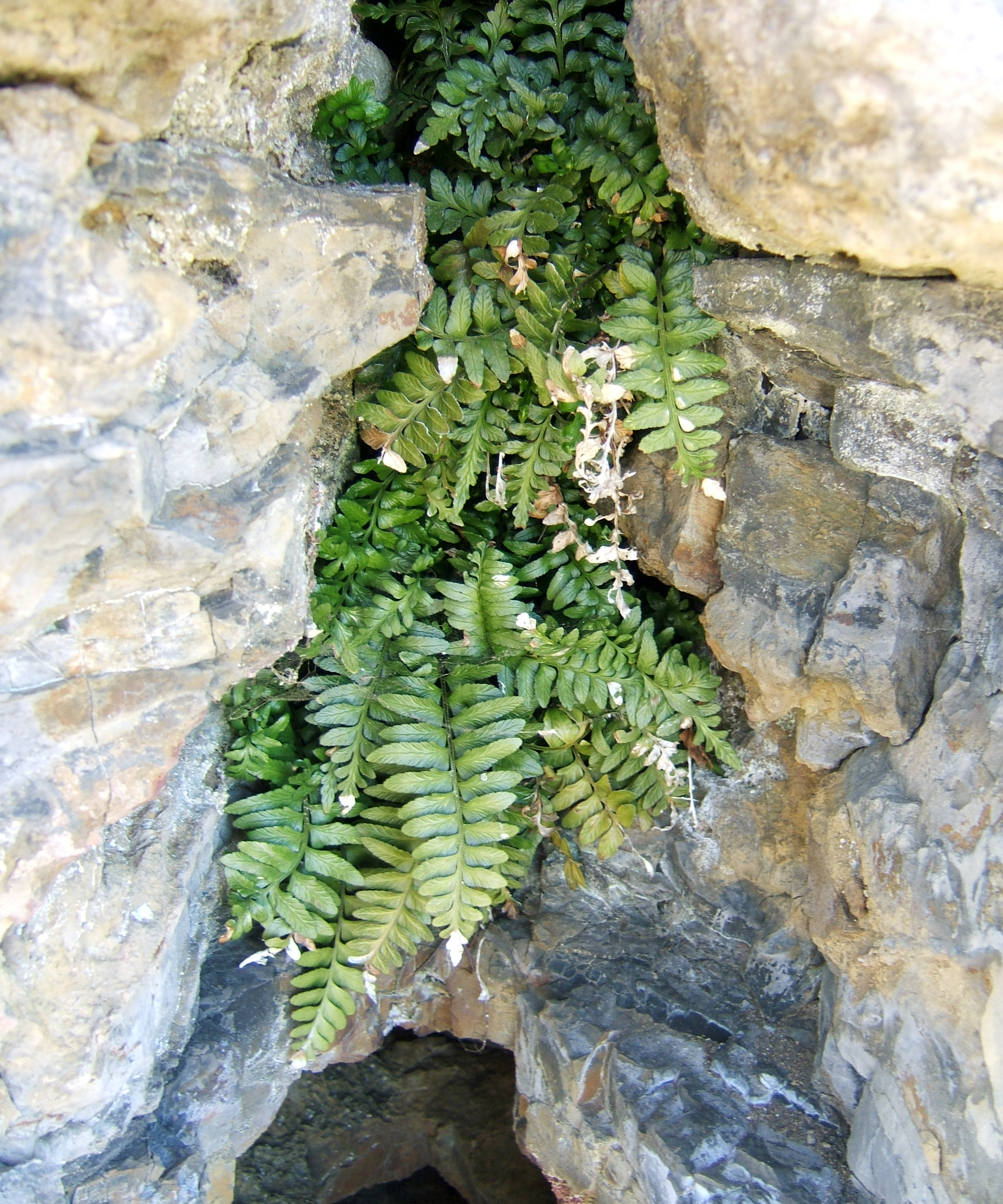
- Sea spleenwort at Cullernose, Northumberland

Scientific classification
- Kingdom: Plantae
- Clade: Embryophytes
- Clade: Tracheophytes
- Division: Polypodiophyta
- Class: Polypodiopsida
- Order: Polypodiales
- Suborder: Aspleniineae
- Family: Aspleniaceae
- Genus: Asplenium
- Species: A. marinum

Binomial name
- Asplenium marinum L.

= Asplenium marinum =

Sea spleenwort

Species of fern in the spleenwort family

Asplenium marinum is a fern in the spleenwort genus Asplenium, known as the sea spleenwort because of its preference for maritime habitats. It occurs around the Atlantic Ocean coasts of western Europe and northwest Africa from southwest Norway west to Ireland and south to Morocco, and the coasts of the western Mediterranean Sea east to the Galite Islands of Tunisia, and Malta. In Britain, it is most common on western coasts, and is absent in the southeast between Yorkshire and Sussex.

It is an evergreen fern with dark green pinnate fronds 8–50 cm long, with a thick, slightly leathery texture; the pinnae are 1.5–4 cm long. It grown on sea cliffs, usually in crevices, often within the salt water spray zone; only very rarely inland, and inland plants rarely lasting long.

It was first discovered by the early English botanist Thomas Johnson in 1639, who found it on his tour of Wales on Ynys Llanddwyn; he named it as Chamae-filix marina Anglica on page 9 of the 1641 supplement of his Mercurii Botanica, pars altera. In 1753, Linnaeus included it in his Species Plantarum, giving it a formal binomial name, Asplenium marinum, which remains valid. In 1875, John Smith selected it as the type species of the genus Asplenium in his Historia filicum.
