= Tricase =

Tricase Thricase (Sicilian) Thricás (Greek)
- Comune
- Comune di Tricase
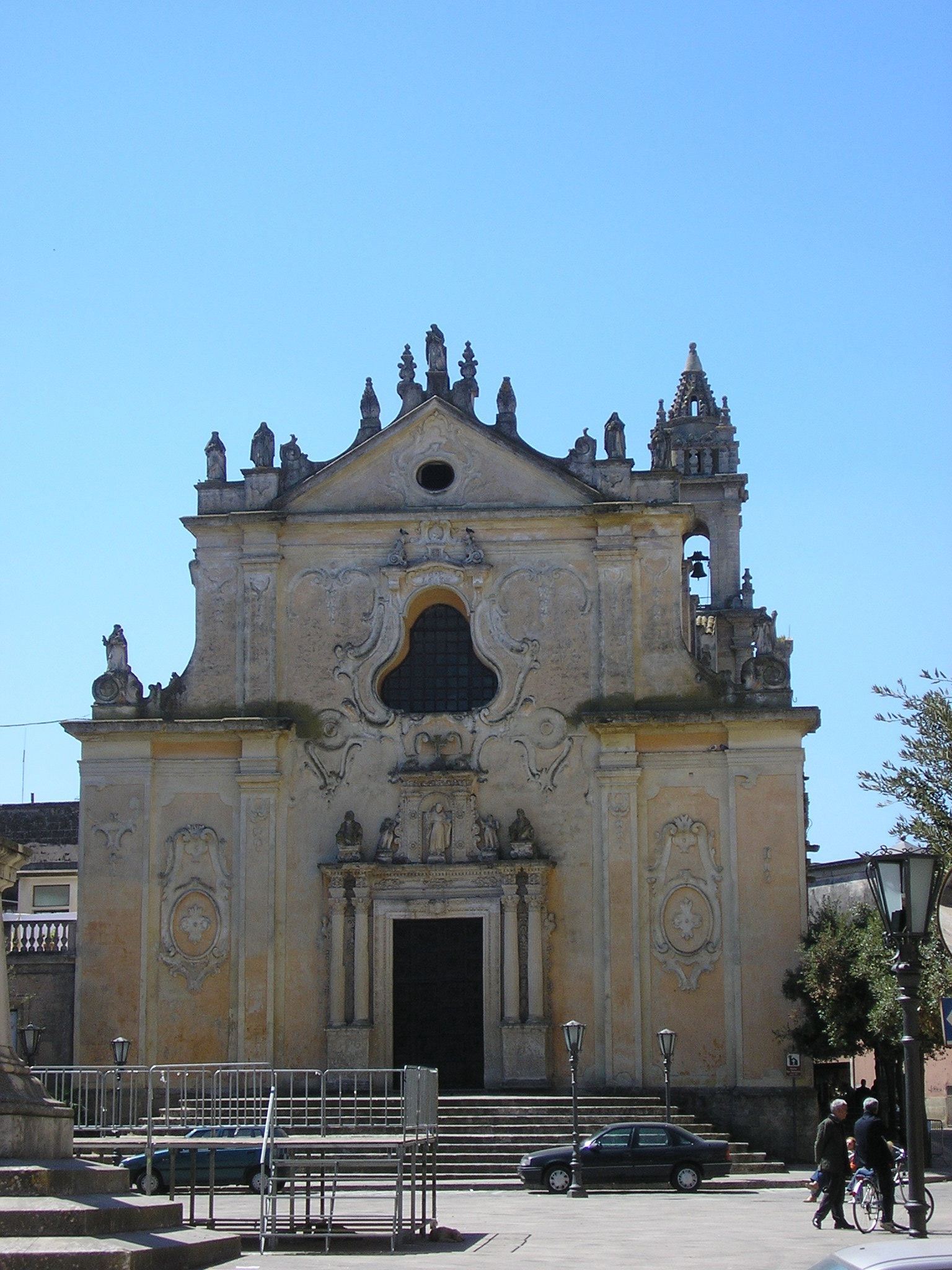
- Dominican convent in Tricase.

- Flag Coat of arms

- Location within Italy Location within Apulia
- Coordinates: 39°56′N 18°22′E
- Country: Italy
- Region: Apulia
- Province: Lecce (LE)
- Frazioni: Depressa, Lucugnano, Tutino, Caprarica, Sant'Eufemia, Tricase porto, Marina serra

Government
  - Mayor: Antonio De Donno

Area
  - Total: 43.64 km^{2} (16.85 sq mi)
- Elevation: 98 m (322 ft)

Population (31 December 2015)
  - Total: 17,621
  - Density: 403.8/km^{2} (1,046/sq mi)
- Demonym: Tricasini
- Time zone: UTC+1 (CET)
  - Summer (DST): UTC+2 (CEST)
- Postal code: 73039, 73030 the frazioni
- Dialing code: 0833
- Patron saint: St. Vitus
- Saint day: 15 June
- Website: Official website

Tricase is a town and comune in the province of Lecce, part of the Apulia region of south-east Italy. It is located in the Salento traditional region. An important hospital servicing the hinterland is Cardinale Giovanni Panico General Hospital, located in Tricase.

== Landmarks ==
The area between Otranto and Santa Maria di Leuca is part of the Regional Natural Coastal Park of "Costa Otranto - Santa Maria di Leuca e Bosco di Tricase" instituted by the Apulia Regional Government in 2008. This territory has numerous natural and historical attractions such as the Ciolo rocky cove.

Other relevant landmarks in Tricase are its castle and a Quercia Vallonea, an oak which is amongst the oldest trees in Italy, dating from the 13th century.
