= Castrignano del Capo =

Castrignano del Capo Kástro (Greek)
- Comune
- Comune di Castrignano del Capo
- Location within Italy Location within Apulia
- Coordinates: 39°51′N 18°2′E
- Country: Italy
- Region: Apulia
- Province: Lecce (LE)
- Frazioni: Giuliano di Lecce, Salignano, Santa Maria di Leuca

Government
  - Mayor: Francesco Petracca

Area
  - Total: 20.27 km^{2} (7.83 sq mi)
- Elevation: 121 m (397 ft)

Population (1 January 2022)
  - Total: 5,113
  - Density: 252.2/km^{2} (653.3/sq mi)
- Demonym: Castrignanesi
- Time zone: UTC+1 (CET)
  - Summer (DST): UTC+2 (CEST)
- Postal code: 73040
- Dialing code: 0833
- ISTAT code: 075019
- Patron saint: St. Michael Archangel
- Saint day: September 29
- Website: Official website

Castrignano del Capo (Salentino: Casṭṛignanu) is a town and comune in the province of Lecce in the Apulia region of south-east Italy. It has three villages: Santa Maria di Leuca, Giuliano, Salignano.

== See also ==
- Angelo Buccarello
