= Ivano =

Ivano may refer to:

== People ==
- Ivano Baldanzeddu (born 1986), Italian football player
- Ivano Balić (born 1979), Croatian handballer
- Ivano Bamberghi (born 1949), Italian speed skater
- Ivano Beggio (1944–2018), Italian businessman
- Ivano Bertini (1940-2012), Italian chemist
- Ivano Blason (1923–2002), Italian football player
- Ivano Bonetti (born 1964), Italian football player
- Ivano Bordon (born 1951), Italian football player
- Ivano Brugnetti (born 1976), Italian race walker
- Ivano Bucci (born 1986), Sammarinese sprinter
- Ivano Camozzi (born 1962), Italian alpine skier
- Ivano Ciano (born 1983), Italian football player
- Ivano De Matteo (born 1966), Italian director, screenwriter, and actor
- Ivano Della Morte (born 1974), Italian football player
- Ivano Dionigi (born 1948), Italian lecturer and rector
- Ivano Edalini (born 1961), Italian alpine skier
- Ivano Fontana (1926–1993), Italian boxer
- Ivano Fossati (born 1951), Italian pop singer
- Ivano Ghirardini (born 1953), French mountaineer
- Ivano Lussignoli (1972–2003), Italian sprint canoer
- Ivano Maffei (born 1958), Italian cyclist
- Ivano Marescotti (born 1946), Italian actor
- Ivano Marzola (born 1963), Italian alpine skier
- Ivano Newbill (born 1970), basketball forward
- Ivano Sacchetti Sacchetti, Italian manager
- Ivano Staccioli (1927–1995), Italian film actor
- Ivano Trotta (born 1977), Italian football player
- Ivano Vendrame (born 1997), Italian swimmer
- Ivano Zanatta (born 1960), Italian ice hockey player
- Ivano Zasio (born 1973), Italian lightweight rower
- Paul Ivano (1900–1984), Serbian–French–American cinematographer

== Places ==
- Castel Ivano, Italy
- Ivano-Fracena, Italy
- Ivano-Frankivsk, Ukraine
- Ivano-Frankove, Ukraine
- Ivano-Hannivka, Ukraine
- Ivano-Kazanka, Russia
- Ivano-Kuvalat, Russia
