= List of hospitals in Italy =

This is a partial list of hospitals in Italy.

== Abruzzo ==
- San Salvatore Hospital, L'Aquila
- San Fillipo and Nicola, L'Aquila
- Castel di Sangro Hospital, L'Aquila
- SS. Annunziata Hospital, Chieti

== Aosta Valley ==
- Beauregard Hospital, Aosta
- Saint-Martin-de-Corléans Hospital, Aosta
- Umberto Parini Regional Hospital, Aosta

== Apulia ==
- Policlinico of Bari, Bari
- Anthea Hospital, Bari
- Vito Fazzi Hospital, Lecce
- Casa Sollievo della Sofferenza, San Giovanni Rotondo
- Cardinale Giovanni Panico General Hospital, Tricase

== Calabria ==
- Ospedale San Giovanni di Dio (St John of God Hospital), Crotone
- Ospedali Riuniti Bianchi-Melacrino-Morelli, Reggio Calabria

== Campania ==
- Ospedale G. Capilupi Capri, Anacapri
- Antonio Cardarelli Hospital, Naples
- Ospedale degli Incurabili, Naples
- Ospedale Evangelico Villa Betania, Naples
- Ospedale Santobono, Naples
- San Gennaro dei Poveri, Naples
- U.S. Naval Hospital, Naples

== Emilia-Romagna ==
- Bentivoglio Hospital, Bologna
- Budrio Hospital, Bologna
- Costa Hospital, Bologna
- Don G. Dossetti Bazzano Hospital, Bologna
- Ospedale "Simiani" di Loiano, Bologna
- Ospedale Bellaria Carlo Alberto Pizzardi, Bologna
- Ospedale Maggiore Carlo Alberto Pizzardi, Bologna
- Policlinico Sant'Orsola-Malpighi, Bologna
- SS.Salvatore Hospital, Bologna
- Vergato Hospital, Bologna
- Ospedale Maria Luigia, Parma
- Santa Maria Bianca Hospital, Mirandola

== Friuli-Venezia Giulia ==
- Burlo Garofolo Pediatric Institute, Trieste
- Santa Maria della Misericordia Hospital, Udine
- Cattinara Hospital, Trieste

== Lazio ==
- Agostino Gemelli University Polyclinic, Rome
- Bambino Gesù Children's Hospital, Rome
- Fatebenefratelli Hospital, Rome
- Lazzaro Spallanzani National Institute for Infectious Diseases, Rome
- Rome American Hospital, Rome
- Ospedale di Santo Spirito, Rome
- Policlinico Umberto I, Rome
- San Giovanni Addolorata Hospital, Rome
- Salvator Mundi International Hospital, Rome
- Sant'Eugenio Hospital, Rome
- Sant’Andrea Hospital, Rome
- San Camillo-Forlanini Hospital, Rome
- San Filippo Neri Hospital, Rome
- Sandro Pertini Hospital, Rome
- Policlinico Casilino, Rome
- Tor Vergata Polyclinic, Rome
- Campus Bio-Medico, Rome
- Paideia International Hospital, Rome
- San Benedetto Hospital, Province of Frosinone

== Liguria ==
- Sanremo Hospital
- Imperia Hospital
- Santa Maria di Misericordia Hospital, Albenga
- Santa Corona Hospital, Pietra Ligure
- San Paolo Hospital, Savona
- La Colletta Hospital, Arenzano
- Evangelico Hospital, Voltri, Genoa
- Antero Micone Hospital, Sestri Ponente, Genoa
- Villa Scassi Hospital, Sampierdarena, Genoa
- Galliera Hospital, Genoa
- San Martino Hospital, Genoa
- Istituto Giannina Gaslini, Genoa
- Sant'Antonio Hospital, Recco
- Lavagna Hospital
- Sestri Levante Hospital
- Sant'Andrea Hospital, La Spezia

== Lombardy ==
- European Institute of Oncology, Milan
- Fatebenefratelli and Oftalmico Hospital, Milan
- Luigi Sacco Hospital, Milan
- Macedonio Melloni Hospital, Milan
- Mombello Psychiatric Hospital, Monza and Brianza
- Ospedale Niguarda Ca' Granda, Milan
- Pio Albergo Trivulzio, Milan
- Policlinico of Milan, Milan
- San Carlo Hospital, Milan
- San Paolo Hospital, Milan
- San Raffaele Hospital, Milan
- Vittore Buzzi Children's Hospital, Milan
- Humanitas Research Hospital, Milan
- Instituti Clinici Scientifici Maugeri, Pavia
- Policlinico San Matteo, Pavia
- Sant'Anna Hospital, Province of Como
- Ospedale di Circolo e Fondazione Macchi, Varese
- Major Hospital of Crema

== Molise ==
- John Paul II Foundation for Research and Treatment, Campobasso
- Ospedale Ferdinando Veneziale di Isernia, Isernia

== Piedmont ==
- San Giovanni Battista (Molinette) Hospital, Turin
- CTO Hospital, Turin
- Mauriziano Hospital, Turin
- San Luigi Hospital, Orbassano, Turin
- Maria Victoria Hospital, Turin

== Sicily ==
- ISMETT, Palermo
- Ospedale Civile Maria SS. Addolorata, Mussomeli
- Ospedale S.Elia, Caltanisseta

== Tuscany ==
- Hospital of Santa Maria Nuova, Florence
- Meyer Children's Hospital, Florence
- Misericordia Hospital, Grosseto
- Cisanello Hospital, Pisa
- Santa Chiara Hospital, Pisa
- Santa Maria alle Scotte Hospital, Siena

== See also ==
- History of hospitals
- Category:Defunct hospitals in Italy
