= Giuseppe Merla =

Italian scientist and geneticist

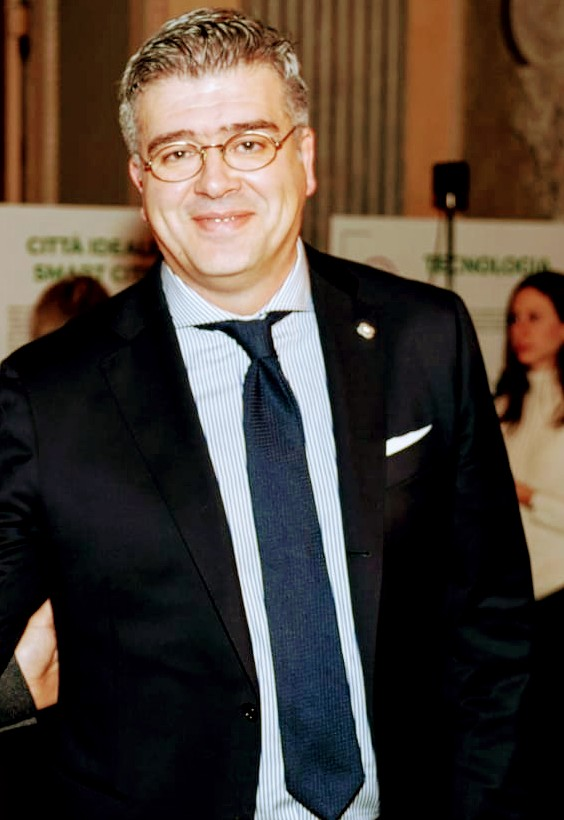
- Born: Italy
- Education: University of Bari; Casa Sollievo della Sofferenza; Telethon Institute of Genetics and Medicine; University of Geneva; Sapienza University of Rome
- Known for: discovery of intellectual development disorder with cardiac arrhythmia
- Title: Director of Genomic and Genetics Disorders Biobank at Casa Sollievo della Sofferenza
- Scientific career
- Fields: Medical genetics; Glioblastoma; Kabuki syndrome; Williams syndrome
- Institutions: University of Naples Federico II, Naples, Italy; Telethon Foundation; Casa Sollievo della Sofferenza
- Academic advisors: Prof. Andrea Ballabio

Giuseppe Merla is an Italian scientist who is a Full Professor of Molecular Biology at University of Naples Federico II, Naples, Italy and medical geneticist at Casa Sollievo della Sofferenza in San Giovanni Rotondo, Italy. He is the managing director of Fondazione Telethon-Genomic and Genetics Disorders Biobank, a member of EuroBioBank (European Network of DNA, Cell and Tissue banks) at the Casa Sollievo della Sofferenza Hospital. Merla and his team led the discovery of a new rare genetic syndrome intellectual development disorder with cardiac arrhythmia and the gene responsible for it. Merla is also known for his extensive research on Kabuki Syndrome. He has been declared as the Ambassador of Kabuki syndrome and received the 2019 Ambassador Day award at the Royal Villa of Monza.

== Early life and education ==
Merla received his degree in biological sciences completing his thesis-research work on Drosophila melanogaster in the laboratory of Prof. Gioacchino Palumbo at the University of Bari in 1996. Then he stayed for a year at the oncology laboratory of the Casa Sollievo della Sofferenza Hospital, and moved to the Telethon Institute of Genetics and Medicine, to work with Prof. Andrea Ballabio, recipient of 2016 Louis-Jeantet Prize for Medicine, first in Milan and then in Naples, where he stayed until 2001. After completing five years of research at the Telethon Institute, Merla went to Switzerland to work with Dr. Alexandre Reymond and Prof. Stylianos Antonarakis at the division of medical genetics of University of Geneva Medical School. In 2004, he returned from Switzerland to Italy to start his own research lab at the Medical Genetics Unit of Casa Sollievo della Sofferenza. In 2009, he obtained specialisation in Medical Genetics (la specializzazione in Genetica medica) at Sapienza University of Rome with Prof. Bruno Dallapiccola.

== Career and research ==
Merla started his own lab in 2004 at the Medical Genetics Unit of Casa Sollievo della Sofferenza. Since its establishment, his lab has maintained focus on the biomedical research particularly in context of the human rare genetic diseases and cancer, ranging from clinical to basic research and therapy. In 2009, he became the Director of Genomic and Genetics Disorders Biobank at Casa Sollievo della Sofferenza in 2009 where he is responsible for managing thousands of biospecimens (DNA, RNA and tissue cell lines) from many genetic diseases. In 2018, Merla and his team led the discovery of the gene responsible for the rare genetic syndrome intellectual development disorder with cardiac arrhythmia along with the collaborators from America, the Netherlands, Brazil and Switzerland. Merla's group was also the first to identify this genetic syndrome. Merla has shown a novel compound heterozygous form of GNB5 and identified GNB5 variants as causative for intellectual development disorder with cardiac arrhythmia. His current research activities fall under the following categories- Cancer genetics, Williams syndrome, Kabuki syndrome and Chromatin-affected diseases. In cancer genetics he is primarily interested in the aetiology of glioblastoma.

== Italian biobank initiative ==
In 2009, Merla was backed by Telethon Foundation to start a biobank at the Casa Sollievo della Sofferenza hospital for the biological and clinical samples from the patients of Williams-Beuren syndrome and other genomic pathologies under the Telethon Network of Genetic Biobanks, a member of EuroBioBank (European Network of DNA, Cell and Tissue banks) In 2013, Merla was introduced as a partner to the network of Telethon genetic biobanks, an initiative of Telethon with a total funding support of 2,136,181 euros. In 2015, he was awarded 431,100 Euro by Telethon for studying transcriptional and epigenetic dysfunctions in Williams Beuren syndrome and 7q11.23 microduplication syndrome, following their seminal work published in Nature Genetics titled "7q11.23 dosage-dependent dysregulation in human pluripotent stem cells affects transcriptional programs in disease-relevant lineages" in collaboration with Dr. Giuseppe Testa of European Institute of Oncology, Milan.
