= Capilupi =

Capilupi may refer to:

- Giovanni Battista Capilupi (1643 – 1716), Roman Catholic prelate who served as Bishop of Polignano
- House of Capilupi, Italian noble family
- Ospedale G. Capilupi, hospital in Capri, Italy
