= Davide Ancilotto =

Italian basketball player

Personal information
- Born: 3 January 1974 Mestre, Venice, Italy
- Died: 24 August 1997 (aged 23) Rome, Italy
- Listed height: 6 ft 8 in (2.03 m)
- Position: Shooting guard

Career history
- 1988–1989: Basket Mestre
- 1989-1990: Aurora Desio
- 1990–1991: Scaligera
- 1991–1995: JuveCaserta
- 1995–1996: Olimpia
- 1996–1997: Virtus Roma
- 1994: Italia U-22
- 1995–1997: Italy
Medals
Men's basketball
Representing Italy
FIBA U20 European Championship
| Silver medal – second place | Slovenia 1994 | Men's basketball |

Davide Ancilotto (Venice, 3 January 1974 – Rome, 24 August 1997) was an Italian professional basketball player.

== Career ==
=== Beginnings ===
Ancilotto began playing association football at a very young age in Mestre. He began to play basketball, first experimenting with various roles, and then becoming a shooting guard, despite being 202 centimetres (6.63 ft) tall, which was tall for a European guard.

== Serie A and national team career ==
Ancilotto played 178 games in Lega Basket Serie A: the first four seasons in Caserta (1991-1995, three in A1 and the last in A2), then at Madigan Olimpia Basket Pistoia (1995–96), and with his last team, Virtus Roma, with which he collected 28 appearances, in the 1996-97 season. In 1996 he was about to be sold to the Spanish team Badalona but chose to stay in Italy and play for the team of the capital.

In his Serie A career he scored 1,890 points.

He made his debut for the Italy national team on 12 November 1995 against Finland, in Helsinki, playing in 18 games and scoring 102 points.

== Death ==
On 16 August 1997, during a friendly summer match in Gubbio in a quadrangular pre-season tournament, Ancilotto suddenly fell to the ground, a victim of brain ischemia. He died at the San Filippo Neri Hospital in Rome on 24 August after eight days in a coma.

His funeral took place in the church of San Lorenzo, Duomo di Mestre, and among those in attendance were people involved in Italian professional basketball. Ancilotto was interred in the cemetery of Favaro in Mestre.

== Honors ==
- FIBA U20 European Championship:

Slovenia 1994

=== Posthumous ===
Several Italian cities have honored Davide Ancilotto's memory:

- In Venice, his city of birth:
  - The CONI Mestre Sports Hall has been renamed after him.
  - The playground at the Albanese-Bissuola Park where he played during summer breaks has been renamed "Anciground" in his honor.
- In Caserta:
  - The curve of the PalaMaggiò arena is officially named after him.
  - An alley that connects an important city road with the hamlet of San Benedetto was named after him.
- In Rome:
  - Virtus Roma officially retired his shirt number, 4, and the fans dedicated the curve to him.
  - On 2 June 2007 the then-Mayor of Rome, Walter Veltroni, together with the president of Virtus Roma, Claudio Toti, and some managers of the team, inaugurated a plaque dedicated to him, positioned near the PalaLottomatica.
  - On the Caelian Hill, a basketball court was named after him.
- In Arese (Province of Milan):
  - The Municipal Sports Center is named after him.
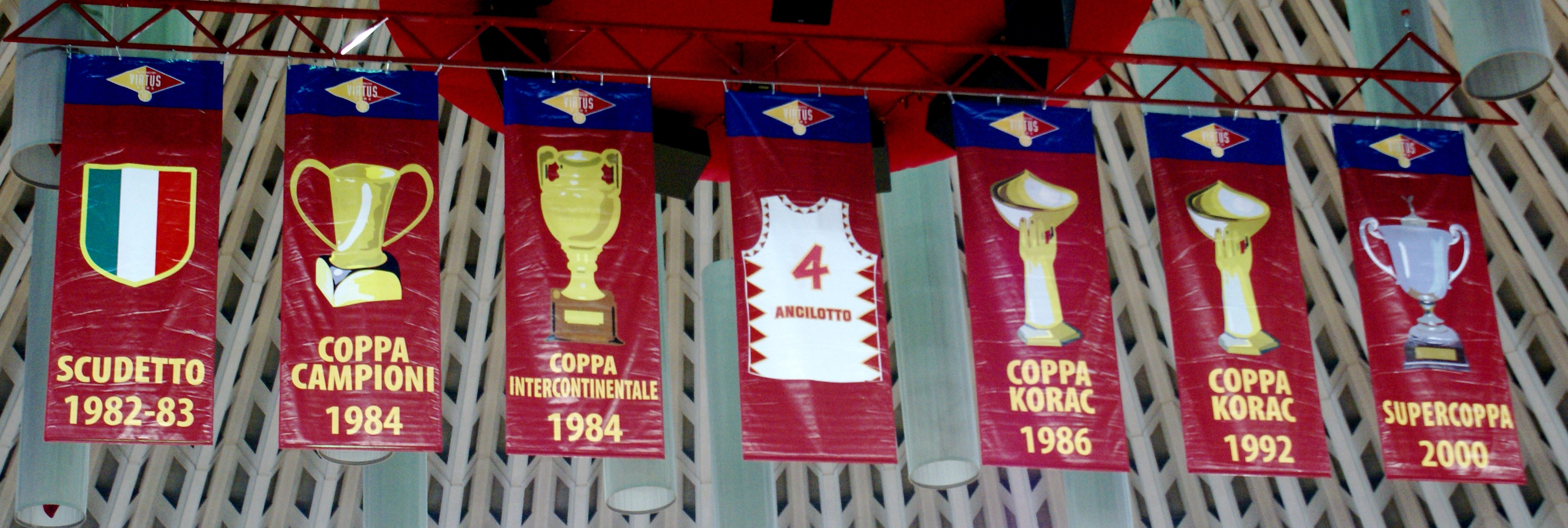
The number 4 shirt of Ancilotto exhibited by Virtus Roma in the rafters of the PalaLottomatica, together with the banners of the trophies won by the team.

== See also ==
- List of basketball players who died during their careers
