= Ivanoe =

Ivanoe is a masculine given name. Notable people with the name include:

- Ivanoe Bonomi (1873–1951), Italian politician and journalist
- Ivanoe Fraizzoli (1916–1999), Italian entrepreneur

== See also ==
- Ivano
