= Gaslini =

Gaslini is a surname of Italian origin. Notable people with the surname include:

- Giorgio Gaslini (1929–2014), Italian jazz pianist, composer and conductor
- Placido Gaslini (fl. 1920s), Italian tennis player

== See also ==
- Istituto Giannina Gaslini, a pediatric hospital in Genoa, Italy
