= Carlo Besta Neurological Institute =

Hospital in Lombardy, Italy

- Istituto neurologico nazionale Carlo Besta

Geography
- Location: Lombardy, Italy

Organisation
- Type: Teaching
- Affiliated university: University of Milan

Services
- Beds: 180
- Speciality: Neurology, neurosurgery

History
- Founded: 1918

Links
- Lists: Hospitals in Italy

The Carlo Besta Neurological Institute is a hospital and research institute in Milan. Is known to be one of the most important neurological hospitals in the world.

== History ==
The Carlo Besta Neurological Institute was founded in 1918. In 1981 the Italian government designated it as an Institute of Research and Treatment (IRCCS).

== Activities ==
The Carlo Besta Neurological Institute is a member of EuroBioBank's biobank program.

Here is active the first, and the most important, neurosurgical simulation center in Europe and the most equipped in the world (Besta NeuroSim) that enable the neurosurgeons residents to practice before to operate on a person.

The other activities regard neurological disorders, brain cancer, neuromuscular disorders, vascular, functional and oncological neurosurgery and pediatric neurology and neurosurgery. The oncological neurology ward is one of the most active in Europe for number of patients treated and number of clinical trials available.
