= Furio De Monaco =

Italian basketball player

Personal information
- Born: 14 June 1976 (age 50) Italy, Cassino
- Listed height: 208 cm (6 ft 10 in)

Career information
- Playing career: 1993–2015
- Position: Power forward

Career history
- 1993–1994: Aurora Desio
- 1994–1996: Olimpia Pistoia
- 1996–1997: Virtus Ragusa
- 1997–1998: Basket Bergamo
- 1998–1999: Basket Forza Armate
- 1999–2000: Scafati Basket
- 2000–2004: Pistoia Basket
- 2004–2006: Pall. Sant'Antimo
- 2006–2007: Pall. Palermo
- 2007–2008: Olimpia Matera
- 2008–2009: Pall. Catanzaro
- 2009–2011: Basket Venafro
- 2011–2012: Pistoia Basket
- 2013–2014: Virtus Cassino
- 2014–2015: Basket Formia

Furio De Monaco (born 14 June 1976) is a retired italian professional basketball player. He played for Pallacanestro Aurora Desio 1993–94 in Serie A2 and for Olimpia Basket Pistoia 1994–96 in Serie A1. De Monaco is per 2017 the Virtus TSB Cassino Team Manager, in Serie B Basket. He now resides in Italy and is a basketball coach.

== See also ==
- Lega Basket
