= EuroBioBank =

European research organization

EuroBioBank is an organization which manages a network of biobanks in Europe. It provides human DNA, cell, and tissue samples to the scientific community for research on rare diseases.

== Founding ==
Before the founding of EuroBioBank, researchers typically stored biobank specimens in their own laboratories and used them only for their own work. EuroBioBank allows researchers in many places to all share specimens.

== Members ==
The following are member biobanks:

- EURORDIS
- Généthon
- Myobank – AFM, Myology Institute France ( Paris )
- 3 C-R (Conseil et expertise pour les biobanques) France (Castelginest)
- MTCC (Muscle Tissue Culture Collection), LMU Munich
- DNA biobank of the Department of Molecular Genetics and Diagnostics, National Institute of Environmental Health (NIEH) Hungary
- Bank of the National Laboratory for the Genetics of Israeli Populations (NLGIP), Tel-Aviv University
- Bank for the Diagnosis and Research of Movement Disorders (MDB), Carlo Besta Neurological Institute
- Bank of the Muscle Cell Biology Laboratory, Carlo Besta Neurological Institute
- DNA cell lines and nerve-muscle-cardiac tissues bank, UOS Malattie Neuromuscolari, University of Milan
- Bank for the Diagnosis and Research on Neuromuscular Disorders (NHMGB), Cardiomyology and Medical Genetics, Second University of Naples
- Neuromuscular Tissue Bank (NMTB), Department of Neurosciences, University of Padua
- Bank of the Molecular Genetics Laboratory, University of Malta
- Neuromuscular Tissue Bank of the University of Ljubljana
- Bank of the Research Institute for Rare Diseases -Carlos III Health Institute (Spain)
- MRC Centre for Neuromuscular Diseases BioBank, London
- MRC Centre for Neuromuscular Diseases BioBank, Newcastle
- Quebec Myotonic Dystrophy Biocatalog
- Genomic and Genetics Disorders Biobank (GGNB) at the Casa Sollievo della Sofferenza Hospital.
