= Meyer Children's Hospital =

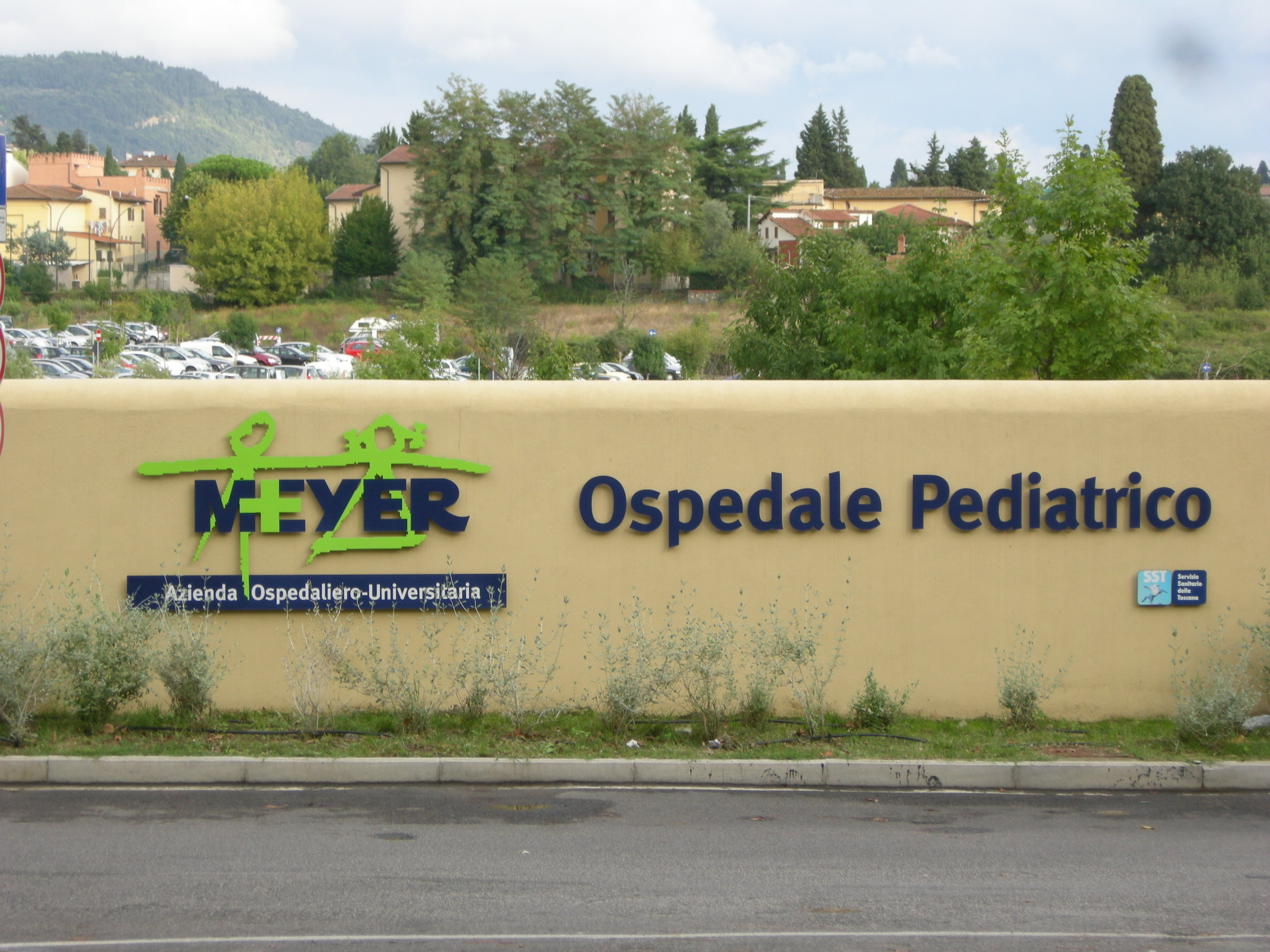
- Ospedale Pediatrico Meyer entrance

Geography
- Location: Florence, Province of Florence, Italy
- Coordinates: 43°48′20.49″N 11°14′51.77″E

Organisation
- Type: Specialist
- Affiliated university: University of Florence

Services
- Speciality: Pediatrics

History
- Founded: 1884

Links
- Lists: Hospitals in Italy
- Other links: Teaching hospitals

The Meyer Children Hospital (Italian: Ospedale Pediatrico Meyer) is a pediatric hospital located in Florence, Italy.

The hospital is an official member of the European Network of Health Promoting Hospitals of the World Health Organization and the personnel are involved in prevention and health promotion programs for the Regional and National Health Departments.
