= Policlinico Sant'Orsola-Malpighi =

Public research and general hospital in Bologna

Coordinates: 44°29′27″N 11°21′53″E

Sant’Orsola-Malpighi Polyclinic
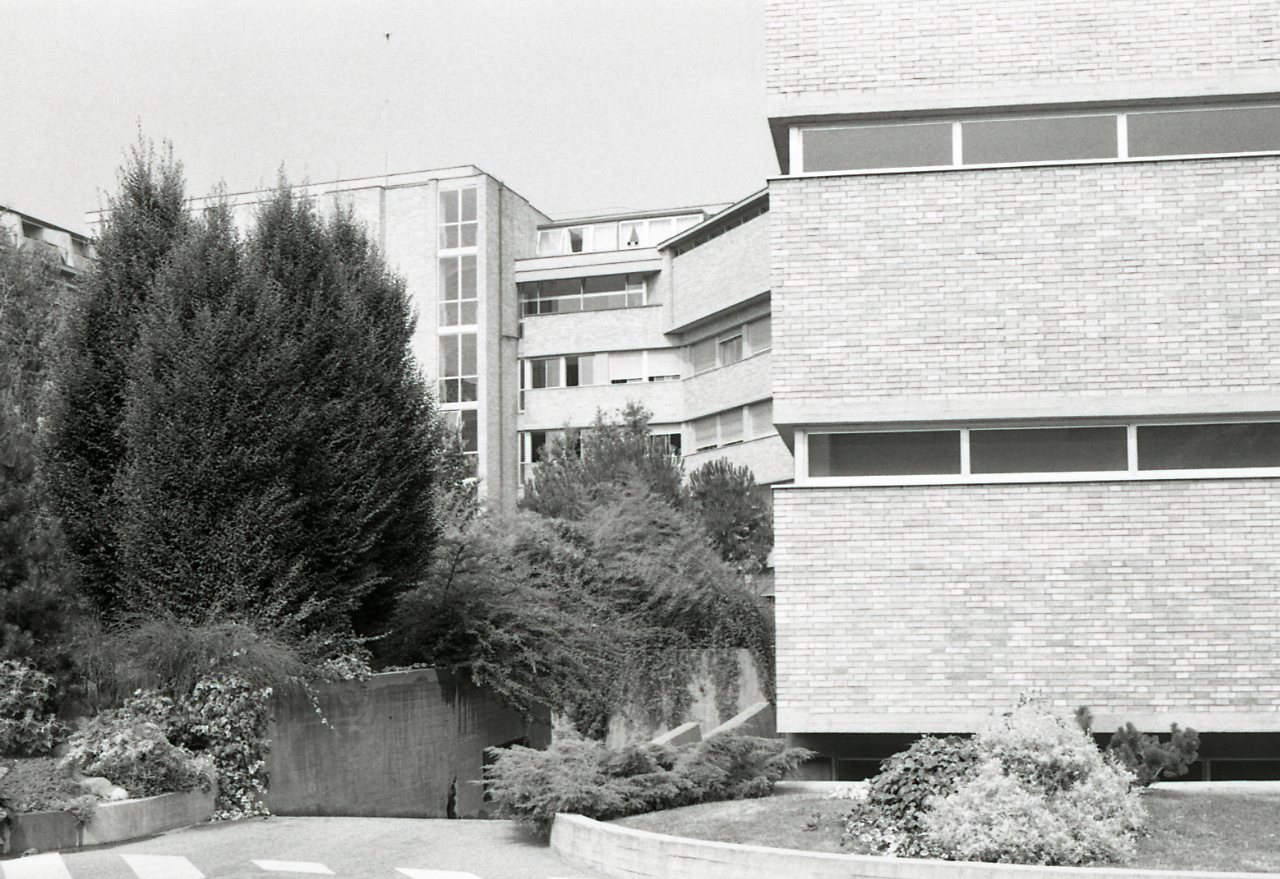
- Policlinico Sant'Orsola-Malpighi. Photo by Paolo Monti, 1974.

Geography
- Location: Bologna, Emilia-Romagna, Italy

Organisation
- Type: District General, Teaching
- Affiliated university: University of Bologna

Services
- Emergency department: I
- Beds: 1,535

History
- Opened: 1592

Links
- Website: www.aosp.bo.it
- Lists: Hospitals in Italy

The Sant’Orsola-Malpighi Polyclinic (official Italian name: Azienda ospedaliero-universitaria Policlinico Sant’Orsola Malpighi) is a public research hospital and district general hospital in Bologna. The Sant’Orsola-Malpighi Polyclinic is the largest district general hospital in Italy, and the first of the four public hospitals of the city of Bologna (Ospedale Maggiore, Istituto Ortopedico Rizzoli, Ospedale Bellaria).

The Polyclinic has approximately 1,535 beds and 5,153 employees (857 doctors). Every year, it has 69,000 ordinary admissions, 139,000 emergency admissions, 33,000 surgeries and 3 million specialistic examinations. It has international excellence in some fields (oncologic hematology, hepatology, pediatric surgery).

The hospital is affiliated with the School of Medicine and Surgery of the Alma Mater Studiorum – University of Bologna 1088.

According to Newsweek magazine, the hospital is the 27th best in the world for cardiology, 28th for endocrinology and 37th for gastroenterology.

== Transplant ==
In Italy, the Polyclinic is the second biggest center for transplants of liver (487 in 2000–05) and kidney (424) after the San Giovanni Battista Hospital of Turin; and also the second for heart (212) after the San Matteo Polyclinic of Pavia. The Polyclinic performs also intestinal and multi-organs transplants. In 2008, for the first time in Europe, a multi-organ transplant heart-liver-kidney was performed.

In 2016, 243 transplants were performed

In ten years (2006–16), 427 heart transplant were performed, with a survival rate of more than 90% at one year, and 80,5% at five year. Both outcomes are the highest nationwide.

== History ==
The Sant’Orsola Hospital was founded in 1592 just outside the walls of the city (now ring road). In 1860–69, finally, it became home to the clinics of the Faculty of Medicine. The hospital was dedicated to Saint Ursula (now the patron saint). In 1978 it merged with the adjacent Malpighi Hospital built in the ‘70. The hospital was dedicated to Marcello Malpighi of Bologna, one of the greatest Italian histologist, anatomic and physiologist.

== Structure ==
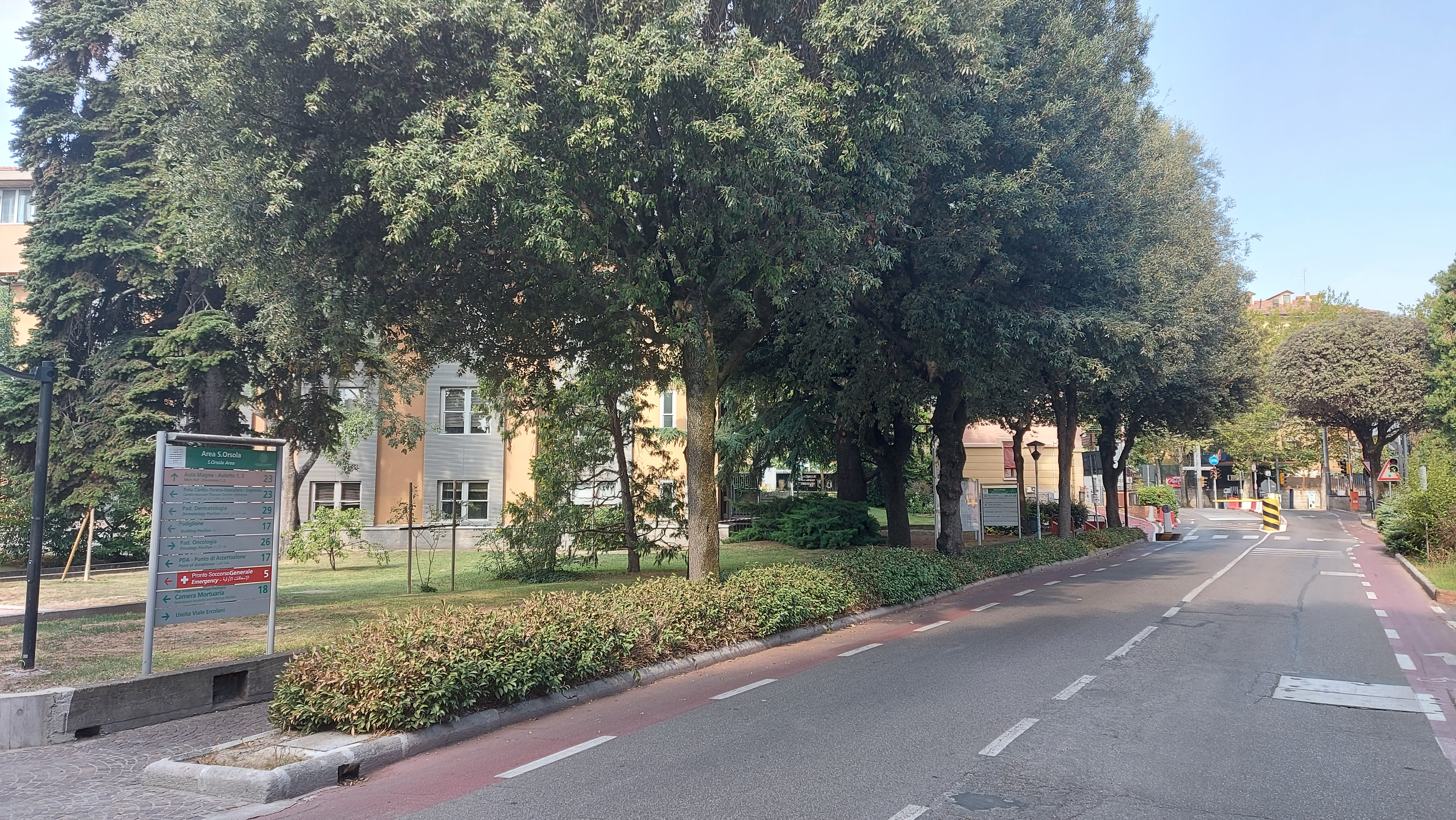
Viale Ercolani, avenue inside the city garden

The hospital has thirty two buildings, called padiglioni (pavilions), which home 84 units (specialist and support) grouped in 9 departments. It is organized as a “garden town” long 1,8 km.

The padiglioni are numbered from east to west (from the furthest to the closest to the city center).

Malpighi Area

- 1 Pelagi (urology, ophthalmology, cardiology)
- 2 Albertoni (internal medicine, geriatrics, neurology)
- 3 Sede Amministrativa (administration)

Sant’Orsola Area

- 4 Ginecologia e Ostetricia (gynaecology and obstetrics, g. & o. emergency department)
- 5 Nuove Patologie (general, plastic, oral and maxillofacial, thoracic, vascular surgeries; diabetology, internal medicine, otolaryngology, gastroenterology and others)
- 5 Nuova ala Pronto Soccorso generale e ortopedico (general and orthopedic emergency department)
- 6 Malattie Infettive (infectious diseases)
- 7 Malattie del Metabolismo (metabolic diseases)
- 8 Ematologia “L. e A. Seragnoli” (hematology)
- 9 Centro Mammografico (mammography)
- 10 Pediatria “G. Gozzadini” (pediatrics)
- 11 Clinica Medica (diabetology, endocrinology, medical genetics, internal medicine, radiology, radiotherapy)
- 12 Magazzino Generale (support units)
- 13 Pediatria (pediatric surgery, pediatric neuropsychiatry, pediatrics, p. emergency department)
- 14 Ambulatori di Cardiologia (cardiology)
- 15 Pneumo-nefrologia (pulmonology, nephrology)
- 17 Palazzina Centro Unico di Prenotazione (administration)
- 18 Anatomia e Istologia Patologica (anatomical and hystological pathology)
- 19 Direzione Ospedaliera (administrative direction)
- 20 Laboratorio Centralizzato (central laboratory)

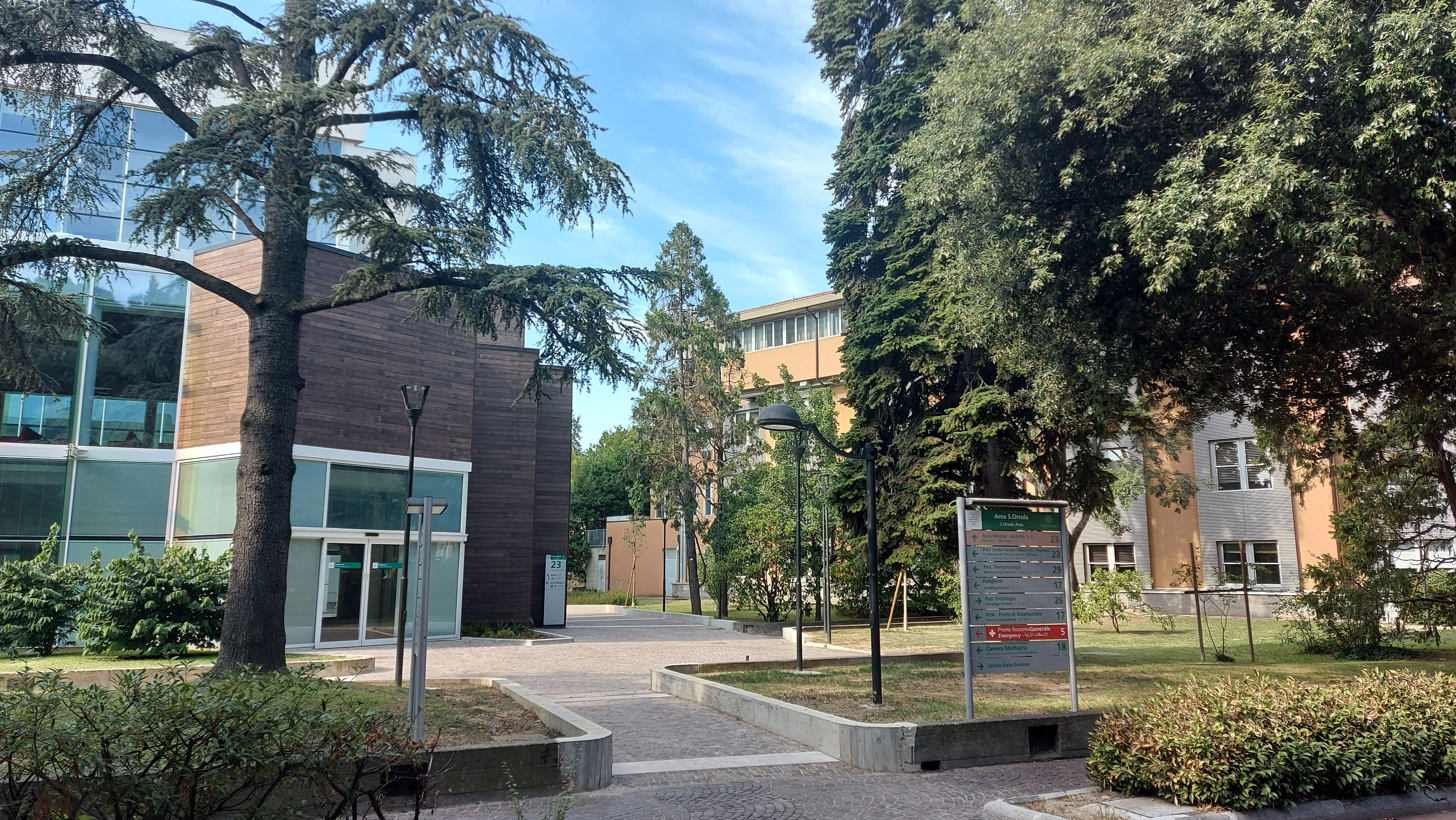
Padiglione 23 Polo Cardio-Toraco-Vascolare (cardiothoracic and vascular surgeries)

- 21 Cardiologia (cardiology)
- 23 Polo Cardio-Toraco-Vascolare (cardiothoracic and vascular surgeries)
- 24 Angiologia (angiology)
- 25 Chirurgie (general surgery)
- 26 Istituto Oncologico"F. Addarii" (oncology)
- 27 Chirurgie (general surgery)
- 28 Chirurgie (general surgery)
- 29 Dermatologia (dermatology, hymmunoematology and transfusion medicine)
- 30 Polo Tecnologico (nuclear medicine, radiotherapy)
- 31 Padiglione Ercolani
- 32 Padiglione Croce Rossa Italiana (CRI)
