= Sanctuary of Saint Pio of Pietrelcina =

Catholic shrine in San Giovanni Rotondo, Italy

Coordinates: 41°42′25.64″N 15°42′10.89″E

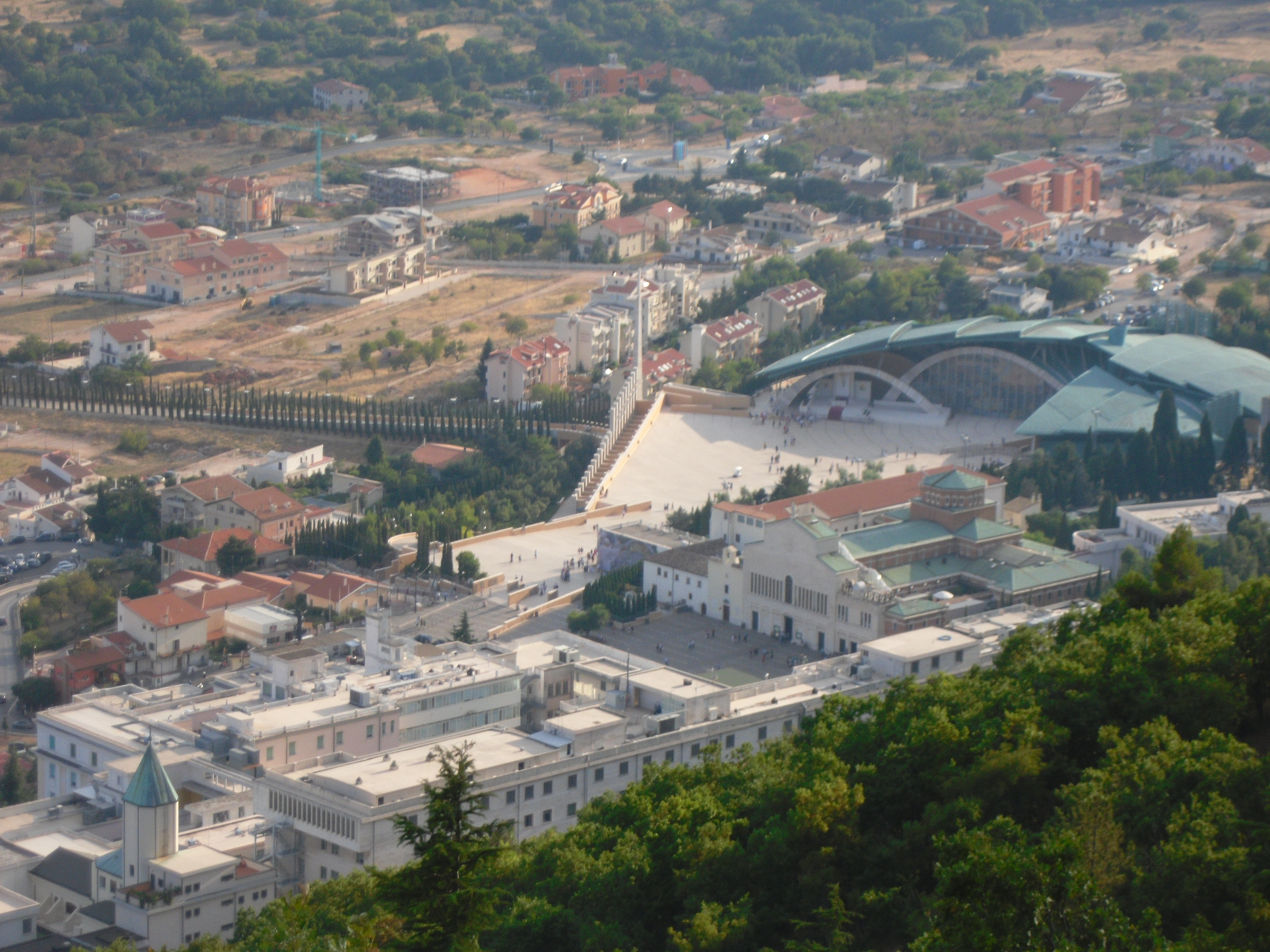
The Sanctuary of Saint Pio of Pietrelcina in San Giovanni Rotondo, Province of Foggia, Italy

The Sanctuary of Saint Pio of Pietrelcina (Italian: Santuario di San Pio da Pietrelcina), also called Shrine of Padre Pio or Padre Pio Pilgrimage Church, is a Catholic shrine in San Giovanni Rotondo, Province of Foggia, Italy, owned by the Order of Friars Minor Capuchin and dedicated to the Italian Capuchin friar, priest, stigmatist, and mystic, widely known as Padre Pio.

Its surface area is 6,000 square meters and is located two kilometers from the town center. It houses the old church called the Sanctuary of Santa Maria delle Grazie (Our Lady of Grace Capuchin Friary) and its attached convent where Saint Padre Pio lived and the new Chiesa San Pio or Padre Pio Pilgrimage Church right behind it.

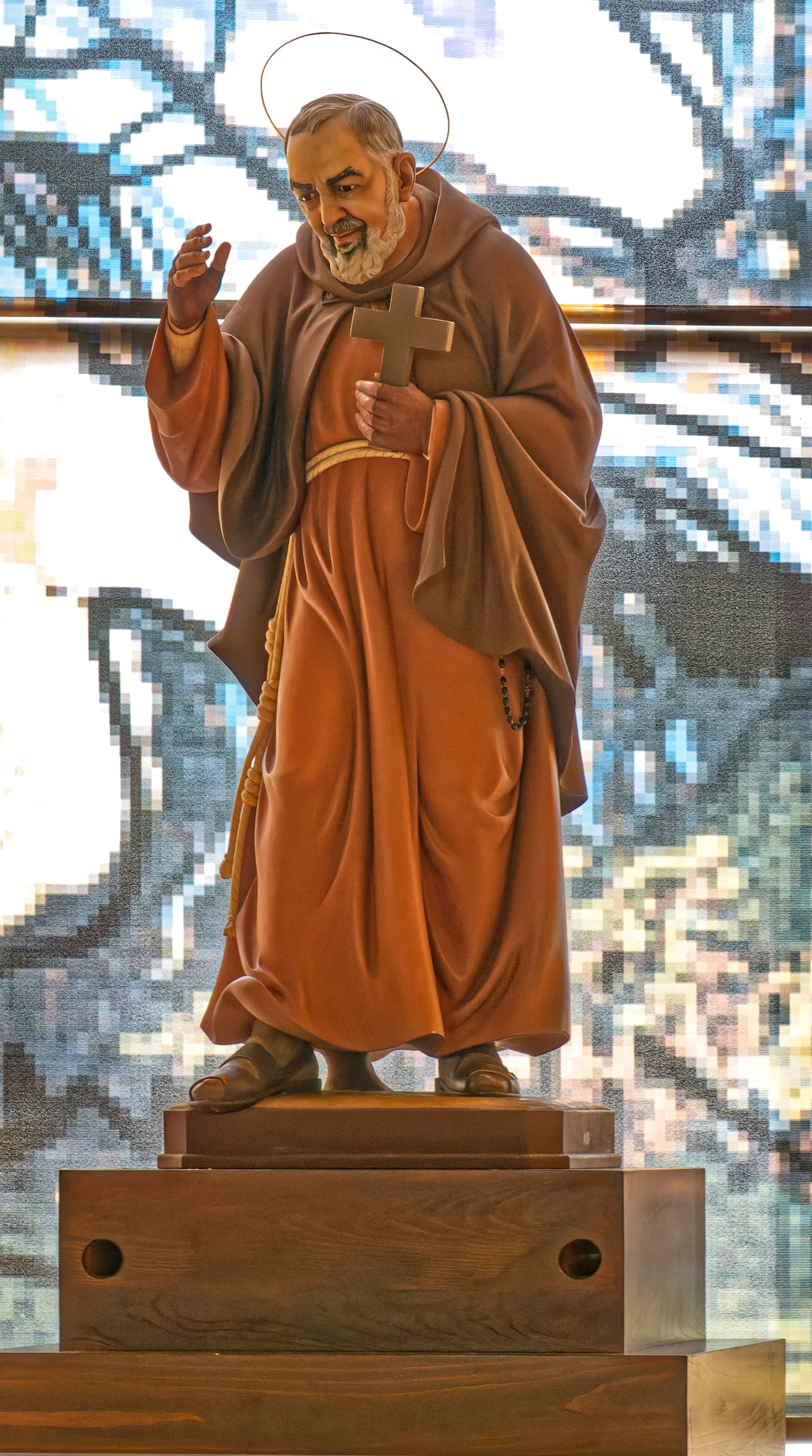
Devoted statue of Padre Pio inside the shrine

Built in devotion to Saint Pio of Pietrelcina, the Padre Pio Pilgrimage Church can accommodate 6,500 people seated at worship, with standing room for 30,000 people outside. It was built from 1998 to 2004. The body of St. Padre Pio was moved to the sanctuary or newer church in 2010 and is placed in enclosed glass. The Genoan architect Renzo Piano designed the Padre Pio Pilgrimage Church. It is located in front of Casa Sollievo della Sofferenza ("Home for the Relief of Suffering"), a large Italian hospital and research center, founded by Padre Pio.

Pope Benedict XVI visited the shrine to say mass at the Padre Pio Pilgrimage Church in June 2009.

Pope Francis visited the shrine in March 2018.

== See also ==
- Saint Pio of Pietrelcina
- Casa Sollievo della Sofferenza
- Padre Pio TV
