= Basket Mestre 1958 =

- Founded: 1958, 2009
- History: Basket Mestre 1958 (1958–1989) (2009–2012)
- Arena: Palavega
- Capacity: 400
- Location: Mestre, Venice, Italy
- Team colors: Red and White
- Main sponsor: Gemini
- President: (Italy) Guglielmo Feliziani
- Head coach: (Italy) Andrea Ferraboschi
- Website: official site
Home	Away

Basket Mestre 1958, commonly known as Basket Mestre, is an Italian men's basketball club, based in Mestre, part of the City of Venice.

== History ==
Basket Mestre was re-founded in 2009, with the intention of following the tradition of the previous club, which existed between 1958 and 1989. The Club played in Serie B during the 1961-62 season and was promoted to Serie A (second series) where, however, it was relegated the following year. Afterwards, between the 1974–75 and 1987-1988 seasons, it played the highest Italian league between Series A1 and Series A2. It also competed in the FIBA Korać Cup for three seasons.

Basket Mestre reached the quarterfinals for the allocation of the Scudetto in 1980-81. It also won six junior national titles in the categories: Youth, Juniors, Cadets and Propaganda (1975-1984, 1st in Italian).

Players who started in its youth sector reached the National team (i.e. Renato Villalta, Claudio Coldebella, Claudio Pilutti and Davide Ancilotto).

Basket Mestre should not be confused with another local team: Bears Mestre. Same, established in 1990, disputed several seasons in Serie B in the Excellence championship between the 90s and the first part of the 2000s, gaining promotion to A2 in 1999.
