= St John of God Hospital, Crotone =

St John of God Hospital
- ASP Crotone
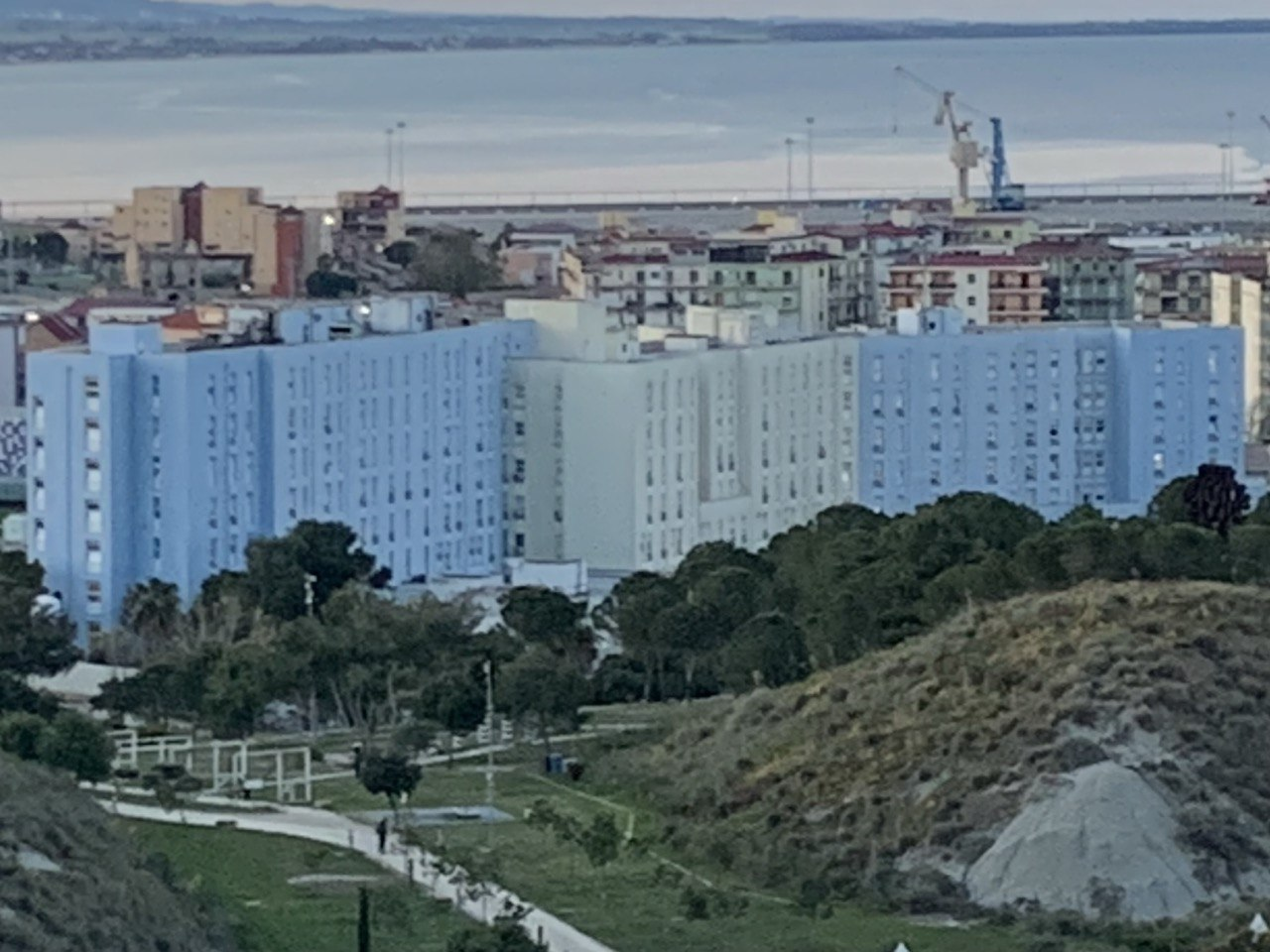

Geography
- Location: Via Bologna, 12; 88900 Crotone, Italy
- Coordinates: 39°04′43″N 17°07′05″E

Organisation
- Care system: Servizio Sanitario Regionale (Regional Health Service)
- Type: Community
- Patron: St John of God

Services
- Emergency department: yes
- Beds: 399

History
- Former names: Ospedale San Jacobo (St Jacobus Hospital); Pio Civico Ospedale di San Giovanni di Dio (Pious Civic St John of God Hospital)
- Opened: 1972; 54 years ago

Links
- Lists: Hospitals in Italy

St John of God Hospital (Italian: Ospedale San Giovanni di Dio) is the main hospital in Crotone, Italy. It is located on Via Bologna, 12, opposite the Ezio Scida Stadium. Managed by ASL No. 5 since 1995, it offers over 300 beds.

Founded in the 12th century as a medieval hospital outside the city walls, it was originally run by Benedictine monks to support the community. In the 16th century, it was re-established as St John of God Hospital, dedicated to serving soldiers and the local poor. The hospital's current structure, inaugurated in 1972, includes modernized facilities and specialized departments, such as Cardiology and Intensive Care, reflecting its ongoing role in regional healthcare.

== History ==
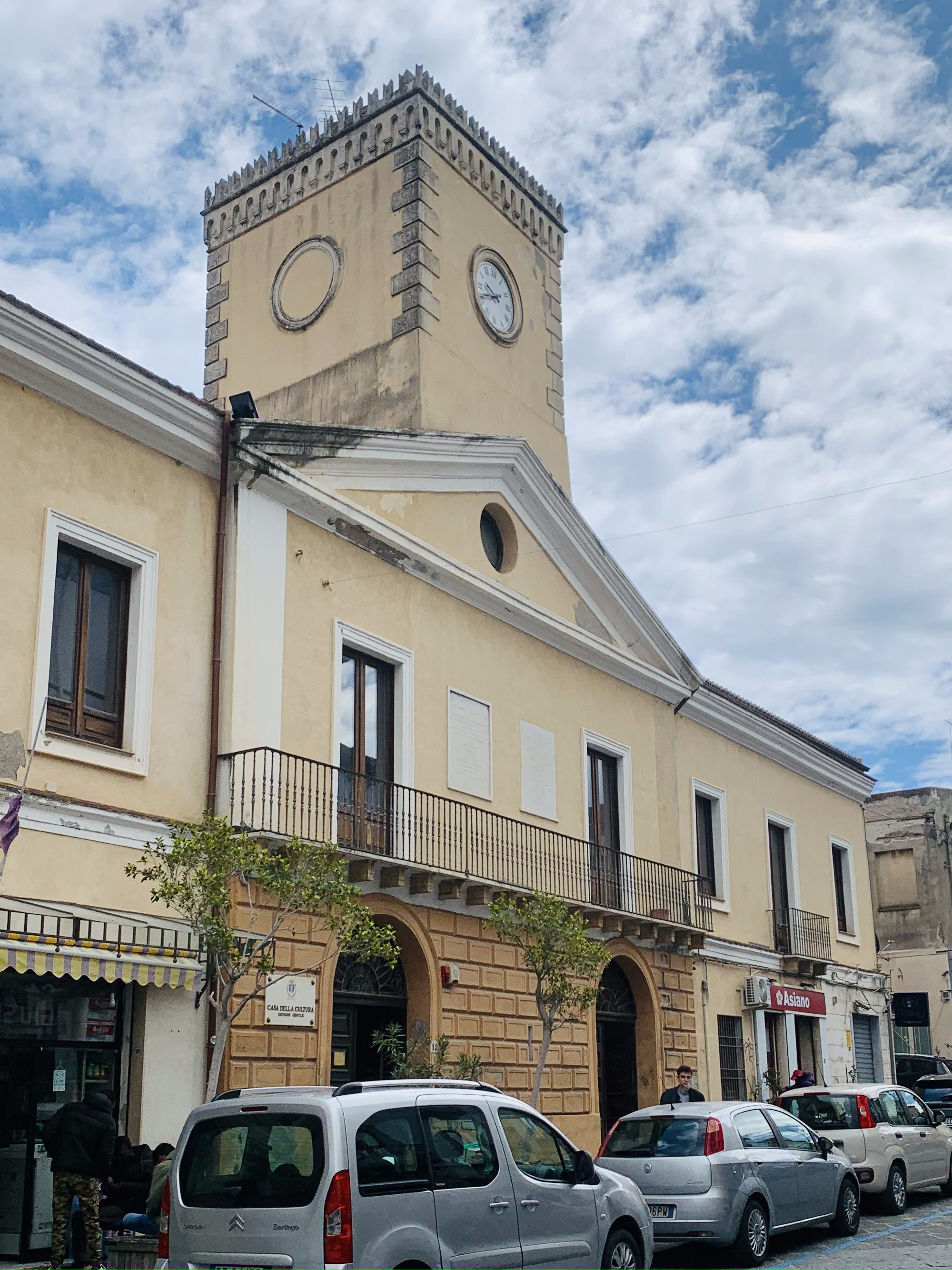
The current House of Culture in Crotone, formerly the convent-hospital of the Brothers Hospitallers of Saint John of God (Fatebenefratelli) from 1667 to 1798.

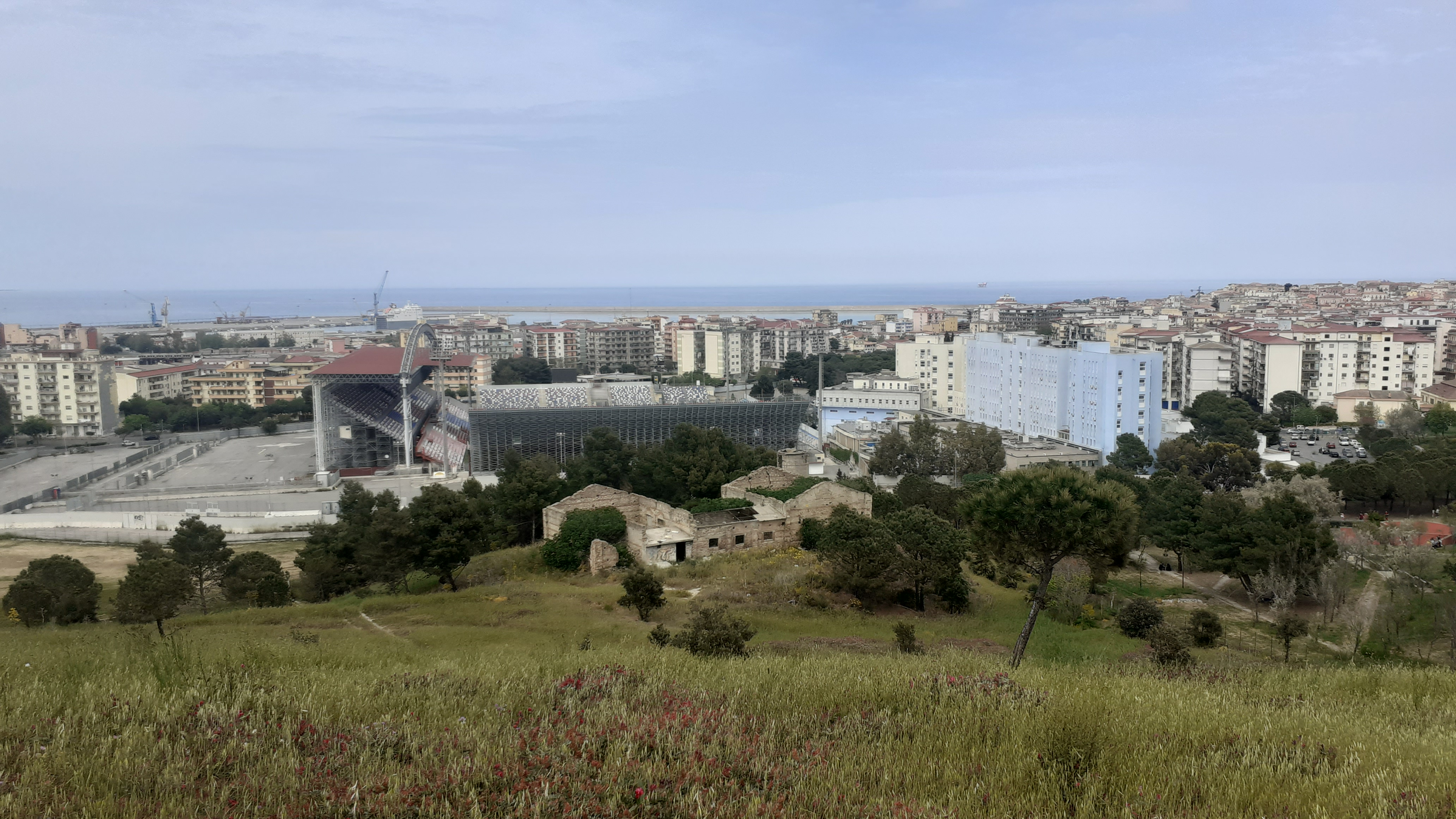
From the upper floors of the hospital (right), patients get a unique view of the Ezio Scida Stadium (left), close enough to watch Crotone’s matches from their windows. This unusual proximity gives the hospital an unofficial "VIP box" feel for game days.

The history of hospital care in Crotone dates back to medieval times, with the first documented hospital from the 12th century located just outside the city walls. Initially managed by Benedictine monks from the Abbey of Santa Maria della Matina, this facility served the local community, setting the foundation for a tradition of healthcare that would evolve significantly over the centuries. By the 1500s, a new hospital known as San Giovanni di Dio had been established, primarily serving Spanish soldiers stationed in Calabria. Towards the end of the century, a shift occurred with the hospital becoming a shelter for the poor and for pilgrims, especially during the episcopate of Bishop Tommaso delli Monti (1599–1608). At that time, the facility was dedicated to Saint Jacobus, operating on an income of 70–80 ducats per year, and managed by a priest appointed to provide both medical and spiritual care.

Under Bishop Carlo Catalani in 1610, the hospital saw a revenue increase, expanding with a small church located in the parish of Santa Margherita. This growth, however, stirred conflicts between city officials and the Church, leading to the bishop's direct appointment of a rector. A decree in 1620 returned control to city-appointed administrators, who ensured support for the poor and supervised the facility's income. Later, in 1628, Bishop Niceforo Melisseno Comneno formed the "Compuntione" congregation to support charitable activities and promote spiritual practices, with members meeting weekly to assist the hospital's patients. In 1666, with the approval of the Church, city leaders transferred the hospital's management to the Brothers Hospitallers, with Brother Bonaventura Pentinachi overseeing operations. Their responsibilities included both healthcare and spiritual support, along with maintaining the premises and supplying the dispensary with medicines.

Throughout the 18th century, the hospital faced new demands and financial constraints, complicated by the upkeep of deteriorating structures. A growing military presence and the influx of workers from the port's construction project heightened the need for health services, transforming the hospital into a vital resource for both soldiers and laborers. By 1750, the Brothers Hospitallers hired physician Giuseppe Vitale to provide care for these populations. Following the 1783 earthquake and King Ferdinand IV’s reforms, the hospital was restructured as a secular entity, the Pio Civico Ospedale di San Giovanni di Dio (English: Pious Civic St John of God Hospital), governed by a board of civic and ecclesiastical representatives, marking a step toward a stable public health system.

In the Napoleonic period, the hospital was expanded with resources from former ecclesiastical properties, though funding steadily decreased over time. By 1831, a plan to expand the facility relied on remaining revenues from local bequests. After an 1832 earthquake caused damage, partial rebuilding occurred, but financial difficulties persisted. In May 1883, the old facility was handed over to the Municipality and repurposed as the town hall, while a new hospital building was constructed outside the urban center on Via Poggio Reale, with support from Baron Berlingieri. The choice of this location responded to the need for a larger, more accessible healthcare structure.

Significant changes occurred in the second half of the 20th century to meet rising healthcare demands and modernize infrastructure. Post-World War II, the hospital expanded its basic departments, including General Surgery and Internal Medicine, to serve a growing population. In 1972, a modern facility opened on Via Bologna. With the establishment of ASL no. 5 in 1995, a new era of healthcare restructuring began, bringing specialized units like Cardiology, Intensive Care, and Infectious Diseases, along with increased bed capacity and advanced diagnostic facilities.

== Facilities ==
- Cardiology
- General surgery
- Geriatrics
- Infectious diseases
- Tropical diseases
- Family medicine
- Nephrology
- Neurology
- Ophthalmology
- Orthopedics
- Traumatology
- Obstetrics
- Gynaecology
- Otorhinolaryngology
- Pediatrics
- Psychiatry
- Intensive care unit
- Neonatal intensive care unit
- Coronary care unit
- Unit of observation
- Neonatology
- Oncology
- Morgue

== See also ==
- Crotone
- List of hospitals in Italy

== Bibliography ==
- Ciampà, Peppino (2009). L'ospedale civile San Giovanni di Dio di Crotone. Tra storia e memoria. Reggio Calabria: Calabria Letteraria.
