= Policlinico Casilino =

Hospital in Rome

Geography
- Location: Via Casilina 1049, Rome, Lazio, Italy
- Coordinates: 41°52′04.51″N 12°35′25.76″E

Organisation
- Funding: Private

Services
- Emergency department: Yes
- Beds: 236

History
- Opened: 1967; 58 years ago

Links
- Website: policlinicocasilino.it
- Lists: Hospitals in Italy

Policlinico Casilino is a private hospital located in the Torre Spaccata area of Rome. It is owned by Tullio Ciarrapico's Eurosanità group.

== History ==
The polyclinic was founded as a nursing home called Villa Irma around 1967 by the Pio Istituto di Santo Spirito e Ospedali Riuniti through the establishment of several branches of the San Giovanni hospital. The name was chosen by Dr. Trombetta, who dedicated it to his mother, who died during childbirth. Subsequently, in 1971, it was transferred to the Via Casilina site, in the Torre Spaccata area, with a capacity of 250 beds for medicine, surgery, and obstetrics. Between the 1970s and 1980s, the clinic was expanded and transformed into a hospital.

In 1995, the clinic was sold to Giuseppe Ciarrapico's company Sanità S.p.A. for 14 billion lire and renamed Policlinico Casilino, with the addition of an emergency room and numerous units including cardiology and intensive cardiac care, plastic surgery, and ophthalmology. In 1998, Sanità S.p.A. was purchased by Banca di Roma to collect the debts owed by Ciarrapico, only to resell it to Ciarrapico's Eurosanità company in 2001 to settle its debts.

In 2016, a new emergency room was inaugurated, covering an area of 3,000 square meters.

The hospital complex extends between Via Casilina, Via Pietro Belon, Via Cataldo Cassano, and Via dei Tucani in the Torre Spaccata area and comprises five buildings (marked with the letters A, B, C, D, and E) as well as an emergency room, a day surgery building, and a clinic. The complex also has a large parking lot and a small park.
