= Ivano-Hannivka =

Ivano-Hannivka Івано-Ганнівка
- Rural settlement
- Location of Ivano-Hannivka in Zaporizhzhia Oblast
- Coordinates: 47°51′01″N 35°22′37″E
- Country: Ukraine
- Oblast: Zaporizhzhia Oblast
- District: Zaporizhzhia Raion
- Founded: 1884

Area
  - Total: 0.7 km^{2} (0.27 sq mi)
- Elevation: 67 m (220 ft)

Population (2001)
  - Total: 96
  - Density: 140/km^{2} (360/sq mi)
- Time zone: UTC+2 (EET)
  - Summer (DST): UTC+3 (EEST)
- Postal code: 70430
- Area code: +380 612
- Website: http://rada.gov.ua/

Ivano-Hannivka (Ukrainian: Івано-Ганнівка) is a rural settlement in the Zaporizhzhia Raion (district) of Zaporizhzhia Oblast in southern Ukraine. Its population was 96 in the 2001 Ukrainian Census. Administratively, it belongs to the Natalivka Rural Council, a local government area.
