= Maria Victoria Hospital =

Building in Turin, Italy

Maria Victoria Hospital is a hospital in Turin, Italy. The construction of the hospital began in 1883, on some land donated by Giuseppe Berruti.

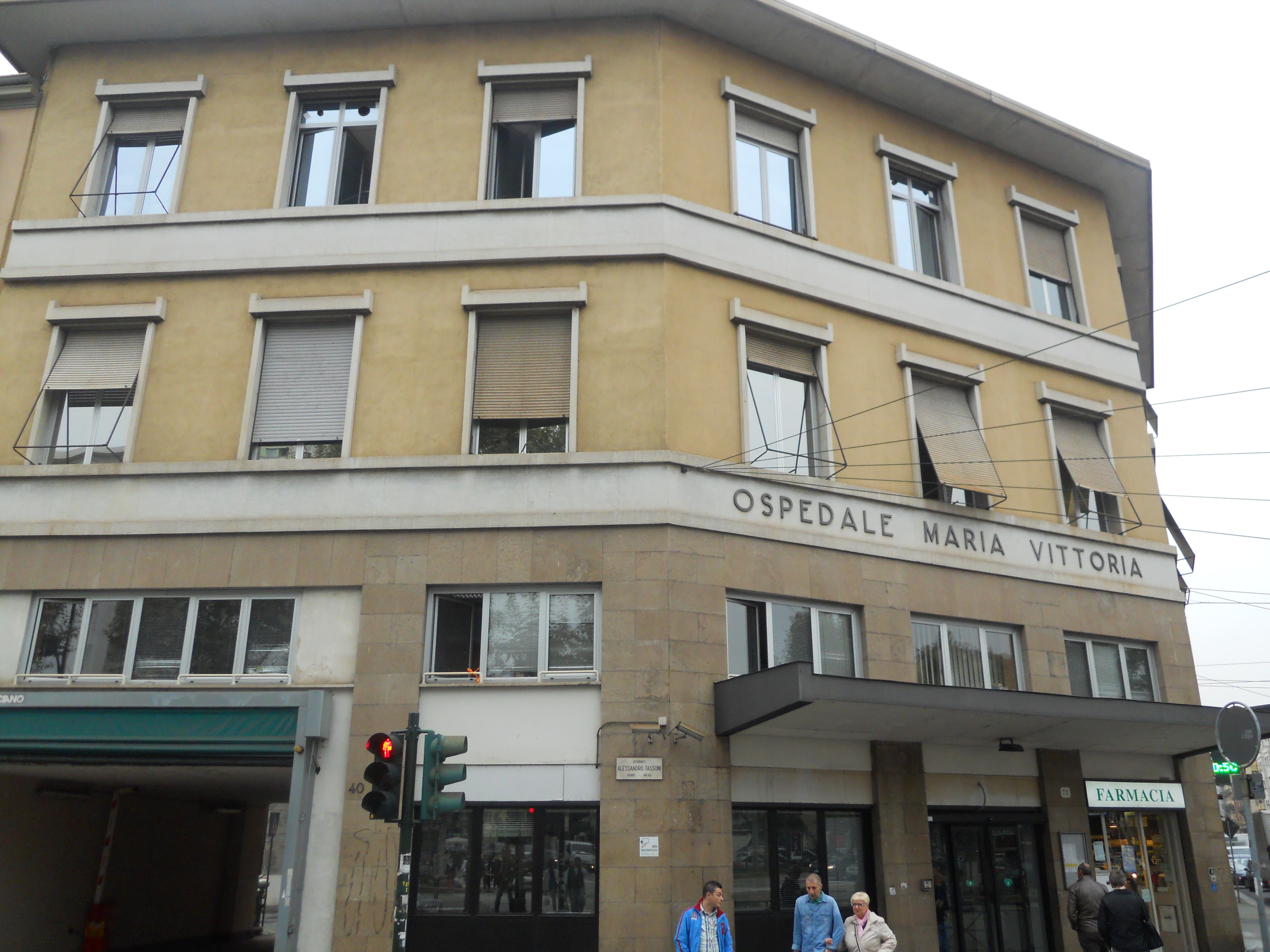
Maria Victoria Hospital

In 1885 there was the inauguration and at the beginning the hospital consisted of three pavilions and twelve beds. In 1886 the hospital was erected as a moral body and the following year the operating rooms dedicated to obstetrics and gynecology came into operation. The chief of the obstetrics and gynecology division Guido Levi, was dismissed from office in 1938 following the promulgation of racial laws but reinstated in his post as soon as the end of World War II, a position he held until 1957. The millionth inhabitant of Turin was born and baptized in this hospital in February 1961.
