= Ivano Ciano =

Italian footballer (born 1983)

Personal information
- Full name: Ivano Ciano
- Date of birth: 3 May 1983 (age 43)
- Place of birth: San Giovanni Rotondo, Italy
- Position: Defender

Senior career*
Years	Team	Apps	(Gls)
2001–2002	Potenza		
2002–2007	Pro Vasto		
2007–2011	Catanzaro		
2011–2012	Cosenza		
2012–2014	Matera		
2014–2015	Brindisi		
2015–2018	Audace Cerignola		
2018–2019	Sporting Donia		
2019–2020	San Marco		
2020–2023	Stornarella		
- * Club domestic league appearances and goals

Ivano Ciano (born 3 May 1983) is an Italian former professional footballer who played as a defender. He played in the Italian lower divisions for clubs including Pro Vasto, Catanzaro, Cosenza, Matera, Brindisi and Audace Cerignola.

== Career ==
Ciano began his senior career with Potenza in the 2001–02 season. He then played for Pro Vasto from 2002 to 2007. In a 2020 interview with VASPORT, Ciano described his five seasons with Pro Vasto as the best years of his career; the article reported that he made more than 150 appearances for the club and also served as captain.

After leaving Pro Vasto, Ciano played for Catanzaro. In August 2011, he joined Cosenza after leaving Catanzaro; Cosenza Channel described him as a defensive utility player able to play across the back line and reported that he had played seven seasons in the fourth tier with Pro Vasto and Catanzaro.

In July 2012, Ciano left Cosenza for Matera. With Matera, he finished third in Serie D in 2012–13 and was part of the squad that won promotion to Lega Pro in 2013–14. He joined Brindisi from Matera in July 2014.

Ciano signed for Audace Cerignola in July 2015 after one season with Brindisi. In 2018, he joined Sporting Donia, which had been formed from Sporting Ordona and Atletico Orta Nova. He signed for San Marco in July 2019, and for Stornarella in August 2020.
