= Ospedale Maggiore di Bologna =

Coordinates: 44.5060°N 11.3141°E

Ospedale Maggiore "Carlo Alberto Pizzardi"

Geography
- Location: Bologna, Emilia-Romagna, Italy

Organisation
- Care system: Public
- Type: General

Services
- Emergency department: Level I
- Beds: 927

History
- Opened: 1955

Links
- Website: http://ausl.bologna.it/

The Ospedale Maggiore "Carlo Alberto Pizzardi" belongs to the Azienda Sanitaria Locale (local health authority) of Bologna, together with Ospedale Bellaria "C. A.Pizzardi". It is the second largest district general hospital in Bologna with more than 900 beds, after the Policlinico Sant'Orsola-Malpighi (which is public but a teaching hospital) so it is autonomous and does not belong to the ASL).

== Structures and organization ==
The hospital is homed in three main buildings of 15 floors, and some other minor buildings, between them the two biggest are the Maternity Hospital and the Infectious Diseases Department. The newest tower (Building D) has a heliport on the roof.

The hospital has about forty Operative Units, between them: four Emergencies Departements (General; Orthopedic; Obstetric; Pediatric) and the "Trauma Center" for regional emergencies system (called "118") known for the largest number of critical case nationwide. Other significant and prestigious units are the "Stroke Unit" and the Cardiology unit. The hospital is also home of the Stomatological Institute “A. Beretta”.

The Maggiore Hospital has the biggest and most crowded medical laboratory of Italy, one of the Europe biggest, with more than 18 million tests per year.

== High-profile cases ==
On 30 April 1994, Formula One driver Roland Ratzenberger was transferred in critical condition to the Maggiore ED, after an accident during qualifying for the 1994 San Marino Grand Prix at the Autodromo Internazionale Enzo e Dino Ferrari. He died on arrival at the Hospital.

The next day, Ayrton Senna, three-time Formula One world champion, had an accident during the Grand Prix; he was airlifted to Maggiore. At 6:40 PM, the head of the hospital's emergency department, Dr. Fiandri, made the announcement that Senna had died, but said the official time of death under Italian law was 2:17 PM, which is when he impacted the wall, one of the wheels from his car impacted his head and his brain stopped working.
