= Ivano-Kazanka =

Ivano-Kazanka Ивано-Казанка
- Selo
- Location within Bashkortostan Location within Russia
- Coordinates: 54°36′N 56°25′E
- Country: Russia
- Region: Bashkortostan
- District: Iglinsky District
- Time zone: UTC+5:00

Ivano-Kazanka (Russian: Ивано-Казанка) is a rural locality (a selo) and the administrative centre of Ivano-Kazansky Selsoviet, Iglinsky District, Bashkortostan, Russia. The population was 421 as of 2010. There are 14 streets.

== Geography ==
Ivano-Kazanka is located 28 km south of Iglino (the district's administrative centre) by road. Bratsky is the nearest rural locality.
