= Casa Sollievo della Sofferenza =

Research hospital in Italy

Coordinates: 41.708863°N 15.707296°E

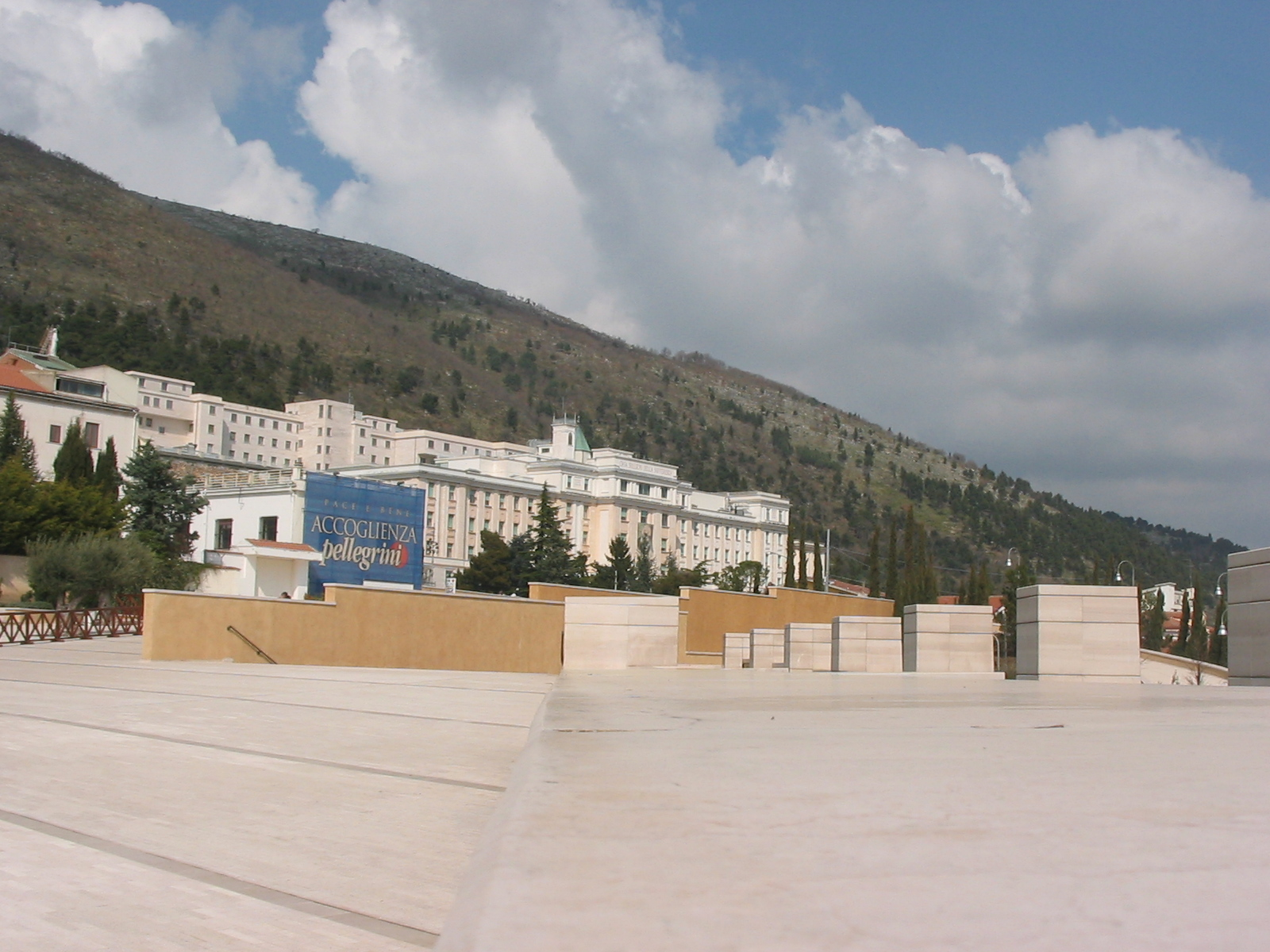
- Type: Private (Scientific Research Hospital)
- Established: 5 May 1956; 70 years ago
- Founder: Saint Pio of Pietrelcina
- Religious affiliation: Catholic Church, Vatican City
- Academic affiliations: IRCCS, Italian Ministry of Health
- President: Archbishop Father Franco Moscone
- Director: Dr. Michele Giuliani, Director General
- Administrative staff: Prof. Angelo Vescovi, Scientific Director; Dr. Domenico Di Bisceglie, Medical Director
- Location: San Giovanni Rotondo, Apulia, Italy
- Website: www.operapadrepio.it

Casa Sollievo della Sofferenza (English: "Home for the Relief of Suffering") is a private scientific research hospital in San Giovanni Rotondo, Italy, founded by Saint Pio of Pietrelcina, and administered by Vatican City. Inaugurated on 5 May 1956, the hospital has adopted modern technologies and is often considered as one of the most efficient scientific research hospitals in Europe. The building is situated at the highest part of the town, on the top of the hill, giving the location an identity of a hospital-town.

Casa Sollievo della Sofferenza has two major activity wings. One of which is an internationally regarded hospital for the relief of suffering and the other is a state-of-the-art scientific research centre which had received the status of a Scientific Hospitalization and Treatment Institute (IRCCS), an institute of national interest, by the decree of Italian Ministry of Health in 1991. The research centre is also home to the Genomic and Genetic Disorders Biobank which is part of the Telethon Network of Genetic Biobanks and conducts basic and pre-clinical research and clinical trials in collaboration with pharmaceutical companies. It is first in the world to run non-profit clinical trials. The hospital has established Institute for Stem-cell Biology, Regenerative Medicine and Innovative Therapies (ISBReMIT) that will be the first factory of GMP neural stem cells in Europe for producing bio-drugs and cell-drugs. ISBReMIT has a dedicated area for the start-ups and spin-offs in biotechnology.

Casa Sollievo della Sofferenza also houses a large out-patient clinic, a hospital-school for the children suffering from cancer and other genetic disorders, a reception centre which is a hotel complex, and a social-assistance residence for elderly. Casa Sollievo della Sofferenza also owns two agricultural companies-Masseria Calderoso and Posta La Via. It also hosts one spiritual centre, prayer group and a church. In front of Casa Sollievo della Sofferenza there is Sanctuary of Saint Pio of Pietrelcina, named after the founder of this hospital and research centre.

In 2023, it was featured on the list of World's Best Smart Hospitals 2023.

== Hospital ==
Casa Sollievo della Sofferenza
- Vatican City

Geography
- Location: San Giovanni Rotondo, Apulia, Italy

Services
- Beds: 900

Links
- Lists: Hospitals in Italy

The hospital manages 900 beds, 206 elderly care beds, 2900 employees, 60000 annual admissions, 9500 surgeries per year, and over 1.3 million annual outpatient services, making it one among the most regarded in Europe. The hospital is divided among 30 medical and surgical wards, 50 clinical specialities, and 4300 diagnostic and therapeutic services."

=== Departments and services ===
The hospital has the following departments- Health Management, Pathological anatomy, Anesthesia and resuscitation I, Anesthesia and Resuscitation II, Cordonal Bank, Banca del Latte, Cardiac Surgery, Cardiology UTIC, PET / TAC Center, Transfusion Center, Abdominal surgery, Maxillofacial Surgery, Breast Surgery, Thoracic Pulmonary Surgery, Vascular surgery, Dermatology, Electrophysiology, Hematology, Hemodynamics, Hemostasis and Thrombosis, Endocrinology, Digestive Endoscopy, Hepatology, Health physics, Gastroenterology, Medical Genetics, Geriatrics, Analysis Laboratory, Internal Medicine, Nuclear Medicine, Nephrology and Dialysis, Neonatology, Neurosurgery, Neurology, Ophthalmology, Dentistry, Pediatric Oncohematology, Oncology, Orthopedics and Traumatology, Obstetrics and Gynecology, Otolaryngology, Pediatrics, Emergency room, Diagnostic Radiology, Interventional Radiology, Radiotherapy, Cardiological rehabilitation, Functional rehabilitation, and Urology.

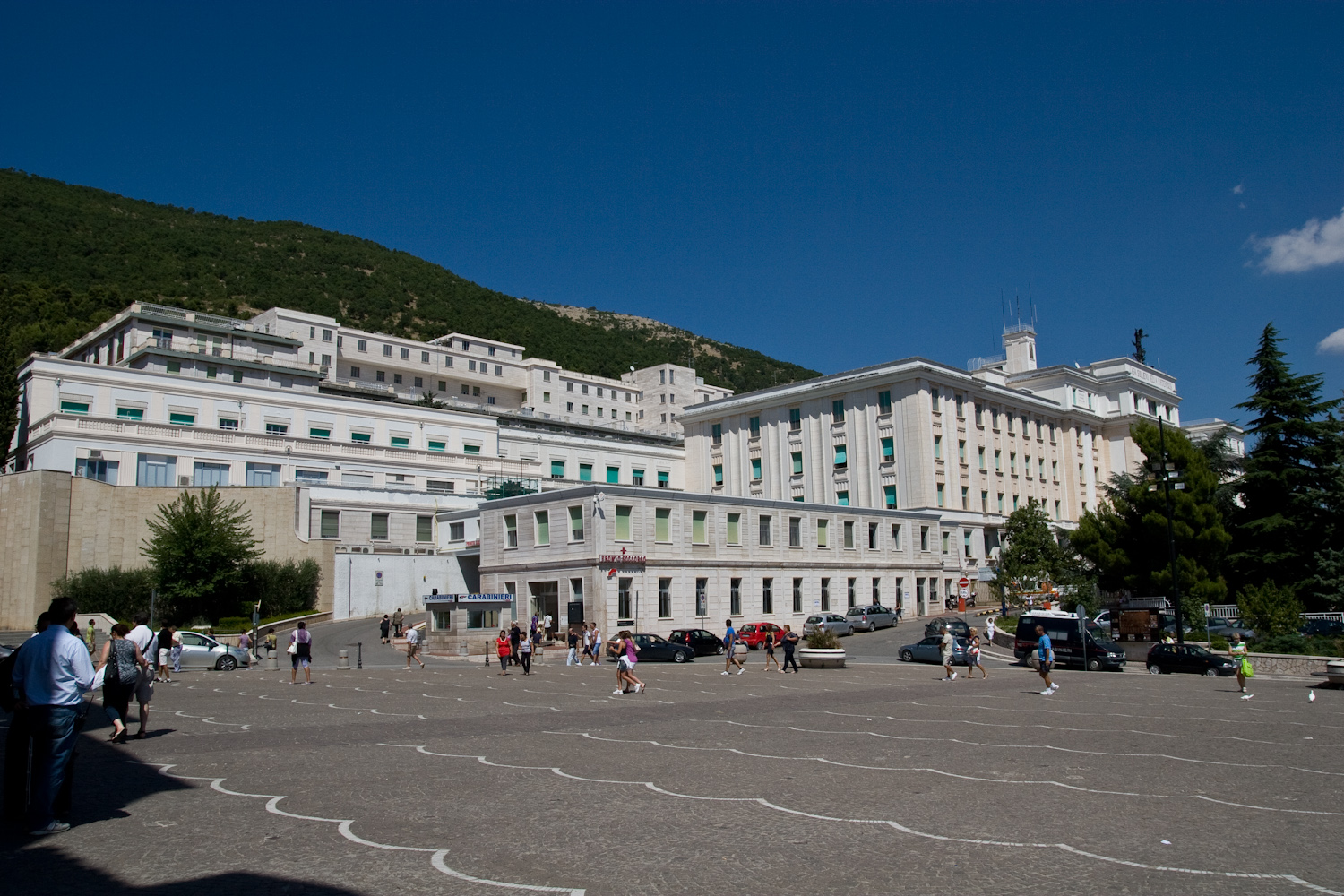
Main building of Casa Sollievo della Sofferenza

=== Assistive Robotics and Artificial Intelligence in Patient Care ===
Casa Sollievo della Sofferenza has taken an initiative to get into the activities of assistive robotics and artificial intelligence in the care sector in partnership with Konica Minolta Inc. and IIT - Istituto Italiano di Tecnologia. They have welcomed Konica Minolta Laboratory Europe to install robotics facility within the hospital. The robotic setup will accompany a patient during their daily routines.

=== Agile Co-Creation for Robots and Aging ===
This project is a European Union and Japan cooperation programme and includes- Casa Sollievo della Sofferenza, Italy, The BioRobotics Institute, Italy, Erasmus University Rotterdam, The Netherlands, Université Paris-Dauphine, France, TRIALOG Paris, France, Kyoto University, Japan, and Connectdot Ltd, Japan. The aim of this project is to implement robotics and artificial intelligence in assistive healthcare.

== Research ==
The Casa Sollievo della Sofferenza Hospital is an IRCCS (Istituto di ricovero e cura a carattere scientifico) research centre of Italian Ministry of Health, an institute of national interest, for "Genetic diseases, innovative therapies and regenerative medicine" and received annual funding of 150 Million Euro in 2017. The hospital received IRCCS status in 1991 from the Italian Ministry of Health. There are 146 researchers who are (or were) affiliated with IRCCS Casa Sollievo della Sofferenza contributing to the total research output of more than 6500 publications in the areas of life sciences & medicine so far. It publishes 170 scientific papers per year on average in the areas of life sciences and medicine, and many of them get published in very high-impact factor journals like Nature, New England Journal of Medicine, Lancet and Science. IRCCS Casa Sollievo della Sofferenza maintains direct research collaboration with almost all Italian universities and other IRCCS, and many other academic and corporate institutes outside the Italy like Harvard University, Broad Institute of MIT and Harvard, University of Oxford, University of Cambridge, Hoffmann-La Roche, Gilead Sciences, Biogen, Novartis, University of Sydney, Osaka University and many other research institutes of high-repute in United States, Europe and Asia.

=== Clinical trials ===
Casa Sollievo della Sofferenza conducts clinical trials in collaboration with pharmaceutical companies. At present, there are more than 200 clinical trials in progress in the areas like amyotrophic lateral sclerosis, multiple sclerosis, glioblastoma and Huntington's disease. There are 171 published articles from Casa Sollievo della Sofferenza that have involved Clinical Trials of Phase I or II and 25 published articles that have involved successful Phase III Clinical Trials so far.

Non-profit clinical trials
IRCCS Casa Sollievo della Sofferenza is also the first in the world to run a not-for-profit Phase I Clinical Trial on transplantation of neural stem cells for the patients who are suffering from Amyotrophic Lateral Sclerosis. Institute for Stem-Cell Biology, Regenerative Medicine and Innovative Therapies at Casa Sollievo della Sofferenza will also run non-profit clinical trials against sla, multiple sclerosis and glioblastoma.

=== ISBReMIT (Institute for Stem-cell Biology, Regenerative Medicine and Innovative Therapies) ===
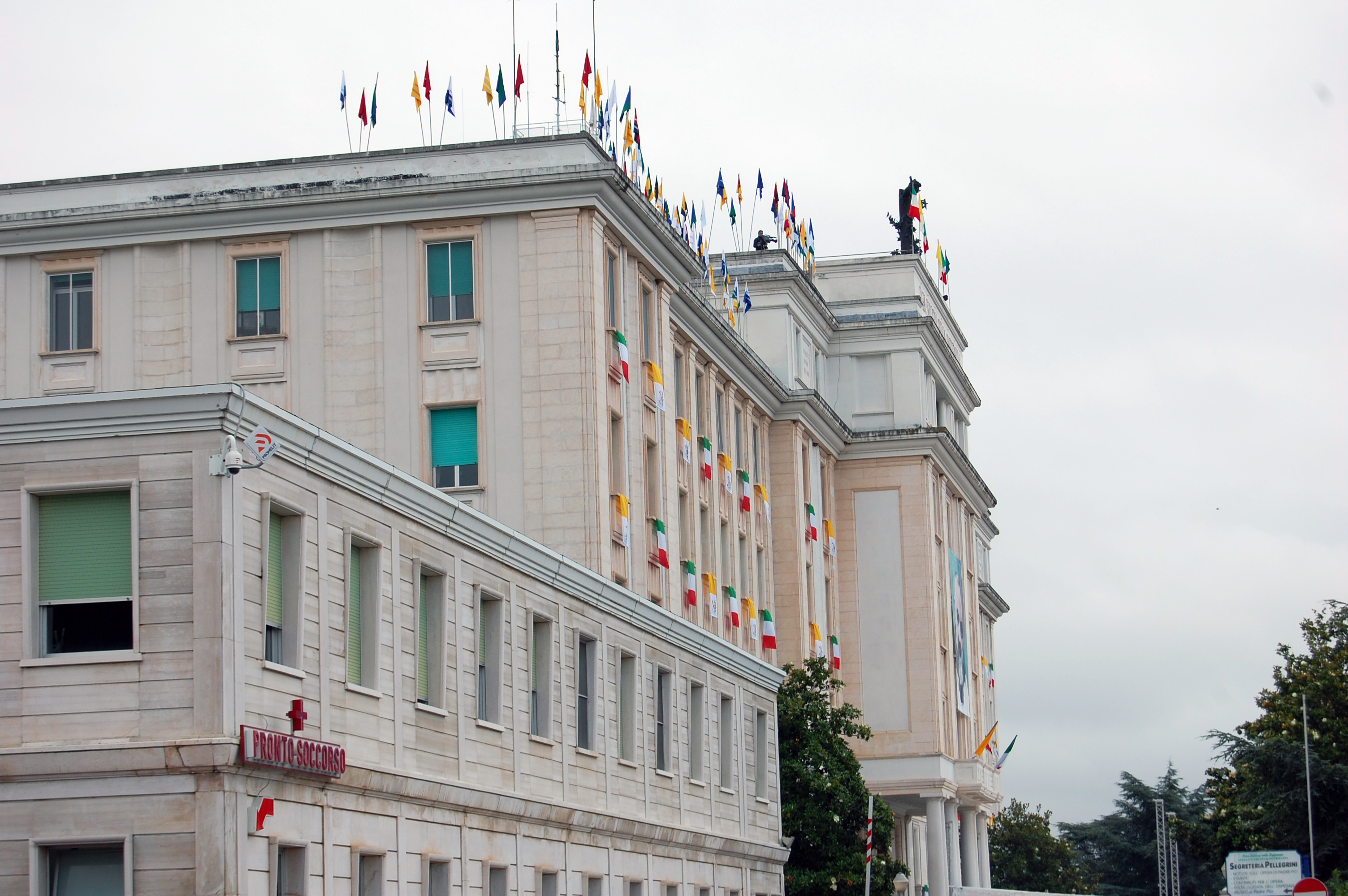

Casa Sollievo della Sofferenza has established ISBReMIT, a brand-new research centre for stem cells and regenerative medicine, with a grant of 14.4 Million Euro from Italian Ministry of Education, Universities and Research. ISBReMIT is the first factory of GMP neural stem cells in Europe and will produce the pharmaceutical grade cells which will be used in clinical trials. This research centre also has an area dedicated to start-up companies for the commercialisation of research. This new building is built between the John Paul II clinic and the hospital building of Casa Sollievo della Sofferenza. It has been structured to produce cellular therapies, gene therapies and prostheses made up of biomaterials, and will run non-profit clinical trials against sla, multiple sclerosis and glioblastoma.

==== Cancer Stem Cell Unit at ISBReMIT ====
This unit of Casa Sollievo della Sofferenza is developing selective biopharmaceuticals. It is working in collaboration with two innovative startups StemGen, Italy and HyperStem SA, Switzerland to revolutionize technology of cancer stem cells in experimentation on patients.

=== Medical Genetics Unit ===
Major activities of this research unit include-discovery of disease related genes, study of genomic signatures in disease pathology, analysis of deregulated pathyways in complex pathologies and functional studies of mutations in genes associated with tumour and other complex diseases. Dr. Giuseppe Merla, a scientist from IRCCS Casa Sollievo della Sofferenza Medical Genetics Unit led the discovery of a novel rare genetic syndrome- IDDCA (intellectual development disorder with cardiac arrhythmia) along with collaborators from America, the Netherlands, Brazil and Switzerland. In 2018, Oxford BioDynamics had signed a deal with Casa Sollievo della Sofferenza to develop a novel biomarker assay for Autism Spectrum Disorder (ASD).

=== Oncology Research Unit ===
Research interest of this unit is divided into three major areas-Epigenetic study of tumour development, molecular basis of chemoresistance in solid tumours, miRNA expression profiling in colorectal cancer, breast cancer and gliomas. The aim of this unit is to study identification of early markers by non-invasive analysis, characterization of cancer stem cells, and develop customized molecular therapies. In 2018, as a member of the network Casa Sollievo della Sofferenza completed RESORT trial Phase II (A Randomized, Open Label, Multicenter Phase 2 Study, to Evaluate the Efficacy of Sorafenib in Patients With Advanced Renal Cell Carcinoma After a Radical Resection of the Metastases). IRCCS Casa Sollievo della Sofferenza has been recognized as one of the 20 highly specialized centres for diagnosis and treatment of colorectal cancer based on studying genetic and molecular detail using microchip technology.

=== Mendel Institute of Casa Sollievo della Sofferenza (CSS Mendel Institute) ===
Mission of this institute is to study and prevent rare diseases. Three major activities of this institute include-research, diagnosis and clinical consultancy. The institute has five major research units-Molecular Diagnostics Unit, Bioinformatics Unit, Cytogenetic Diagnostics Unit, Diabetes Research Unit, and iPS cellular programming research Unit.

=== Diabetology and Endocrinology Research Unit ===
This unit focuses its interest on epidemiological and genetic bases of type 2 diabetes and its cardio-nephro-vascular complications. It has carried out research on identification/characterization of some important genes like ENPP1, ADIPOQ, TRIB3, RETN, IRS1 and PPARgamma2 and also insulin signaling inhibitors such as ENPP1.

=== Hepatology Research Unit ===
Hepatology unit works on two thematic areas-responses to anti-viral therapy in hepatitis and genetics of hepatopathic patients. In 2009, the unit identified a novel marker of response to the anti-viral therapy of hepatitis C in collaboration with Duke University and North Carolina. The study led to discovery of variants of IL28B gene which is now widely used for prediction of response to the therapy. The unit has a long history performing clinically relevant research in Hepatology since the 1990s. Gilead Sciences, one of the world's largest biotech companies maintains strong collaboration with Casa Sollievo della Sofferenza for research on HCV treatment. At the International Live Congress (ILC) 2019, Alessandra Mangia, MD, Chief of Liver Unit at IRCCS-Ospedale Casa Sollievo Della Sofferenza presented the data on role of Gilead HCV Medicines to reach the World Health Organization's goal of eliminating HCV globally by 2030.

=== Biostatistics & Bioinformatics Research Unit ===
This unit deals with the large scale clinical and genomic data. It manages and analyzes the data from clinical trials and research labs and also develops new algorithms. It operates the macro routines in SAS and R language and develops software for clinical trial design. It also deals with advanced statistical and computational methods in genetics and performs survival and longitudinal data analysis.

=== Genomic and Genetic Disorders Biobank ===
This biobank at Casa Sollievo della Sofferenza was established in 2006. In 2009, it became a member of Telethon Network of Genetic Biobanks, and RD-Connect International Community for rare diseases. It has a well-annotated internal database of clinical and longitudinal data and biological samples for multiple genomic disorders, genetic and Mendelian diseases.

=== Transfusion Medicine Unit ===
In 2019, this unit received 10 years of European accreditation from EFI (European Federation for Immunogenetics) for carrying out research in the field of hematopoietic stem cell transplants. HLA Immunogenetics Laboratory of the Transfusion Medicine Unit finished 6,000 immunogenetic analysis in 2018 only. The unit performs genomic typing of tissue compatibility that is translated into the search for the best possible donor from sample both genetically and clinically. It maintains an international registration for donors and has 4000 potential samples so far.

== John Paul II outpatient clinic ==
"John Paul II" outpatient clinic is medical complex spread over 25000 square meters and manages over 1.3 million outpatient services per year. Built in 2002, this complex was a further step towards "Cittadella Ospedaliera", as desired by Saint Pio, the founder of Casa Sollievo della Sofferenza. This complex is entirely managed through open source technologies. With 60 speciality clinics the complex is managed through a single booking centre, and houses the most modern equipments in the world.

== The School in the Hospital ==
Casa Sollievo della Sofferenza runs a school for children suffering from cancer and other genetic diseases. The school is a section of the Hematology and Pediatric Oncology Unit. It has a school library, IT support and provides all kind of materials and facilities for creative and recreational initiatives.It is a unique initiative of Casa Sollievo della Sofferenza.

== S. Maria delle Grazie reception centre (hotel complex) ==
This is located just a few meters away from Casa Sollievo della Sofferenza. It has 217 beds divided into single and double rooms with private bathrooms, Conference hall, Chapel with Eucharist, Restaurant, TV room, Bar reserved for guests only, and Car parking with garage.

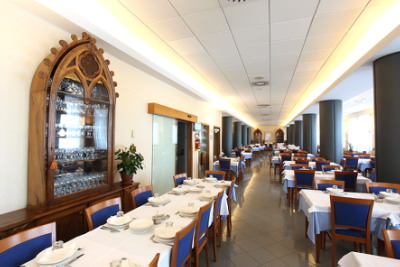
Restaurant at the Reception Center of Casa Sollievo della Sofferenza

== Casa Padre Pio residence for the elderly ==
It offers a hotel-type hospitality service with full respect to personal freedom, human and Christian dignity. The services include-Reading room, TV room, library, conference room, gym with an instructor, bar & restaurant, a private chapel with daily Mass celebration, spiritual and religious guidance, fully guaranteed social and health assistance, laundry and hairdresser for men and women. The first stone of this residence was blessed by Pope John Paul II on May 23, 1987.

== The agricultural activity of the Casa Sollievo della Sofferenza ==
Casa Sollievo della Sofferenza owns and runs two agritultural companies: Masseria Calderoso and Posta la Via.

=== Masseria Calderoso ===
The Masseria Calderoso farm extends over 71 hectares with about 9,400 olive trees of the Peranzana, Ogliarola Garganica and Rotondella varieties. The farm produces extra virgin olive oil, strictly through biological production methods, which is used by the Casa Sollievo della Sofferenza Hospital and its associated facilities.

=== Posta la Via ===
Posta la Via, spread over more than 200 hectares of area, is divided into three sectors-agricultural, livestock and dairy. The agricultural sector is responsible for organic cultivation. The livestock supplies dairy cattle and fattening calves. The dairy unit produces dairy products (mozzarella, ricotta, caciocavalli, caciottine, butter, crescenza, yogurt, puddings and ice cream).

== See also ==
- Saint Pio of Pietrelcina
- Sanctuary of Saint Pio of Pietrelcina
- Padre Pio TV
