= Istituto Giannina Gaslini =

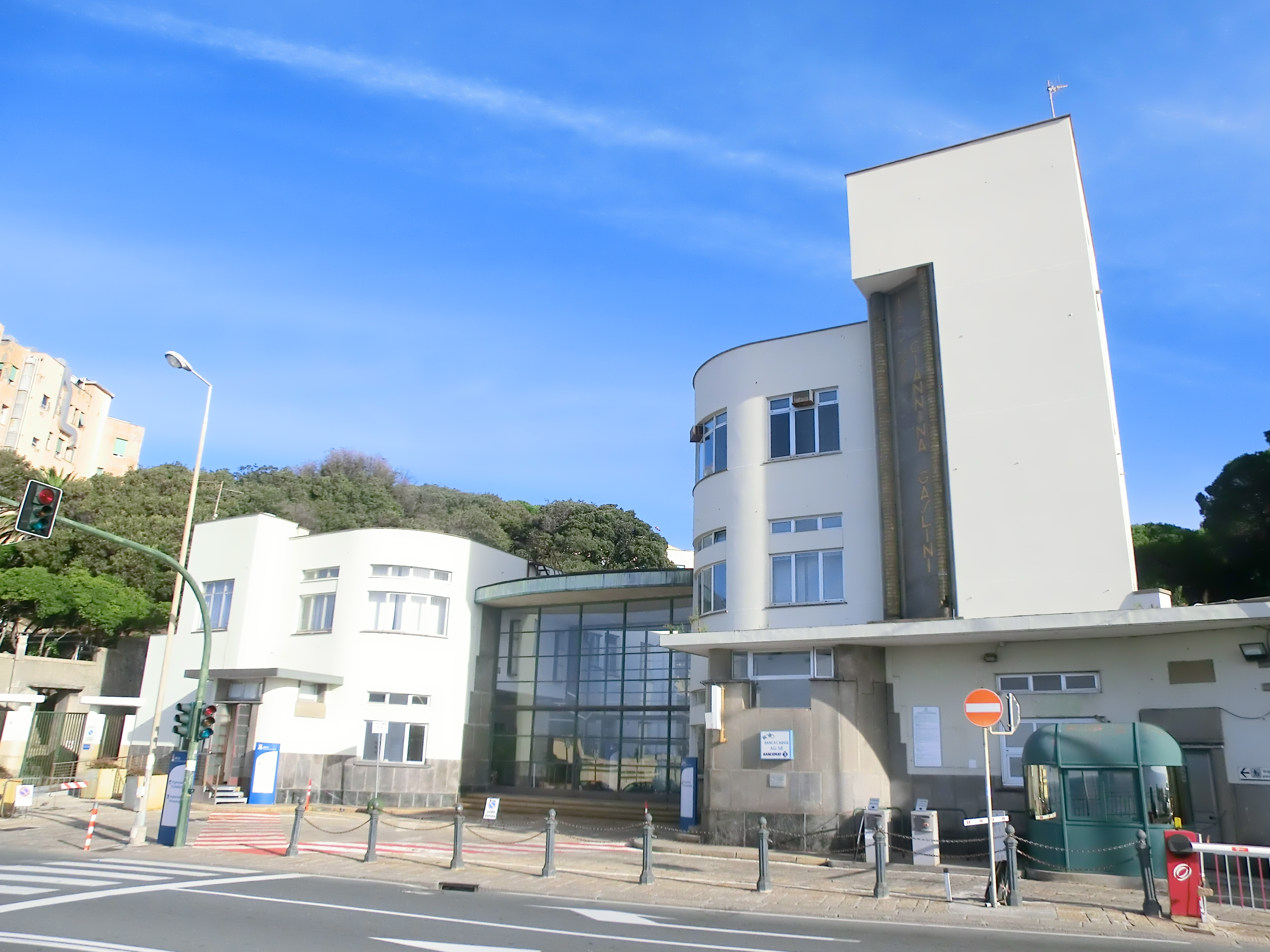

Geography
- Location: Genoa, Liguria, Italy
- Coordinates: 44.392843°N 8.988007°E

Organisation
- Type: Specialist

Services
- Emergency department: Yes
- Beds: 516
- Speciality: Paediatric Medicine; surgery

History
- Founded: 15 May 1938

Links
- Website: http://www.gaslini.org
- Lists: Hospitals in Italy

The Istituto Giannina Gaslini is the biggest pediatric hospital of North Italy, located in Genoa Quarto dei Mille and founded by the Italian industrialist, politician and philanthropist Gerolamo Gaslini (Count of Saint Jerome) in 1938.

It is considered one of the best children's hospitals of Europe. it is known worldwide and in 1956 it was recognized as Istituto di Ricovero e Cura a Carattere Scientifico (IRCCS).

== History ==
In 1931 Gerolamo Gaslini, together with his wife Lorenza, had the idea of building an institute for care and infancy named after his daughter Giannina, who died in 1917 at eleven years old, perhaps due to peritonitis which was not diagnosed in time. Gaslini did not accept the fact that children could die for lack of timely and adequate treatment, so he decided to create a pediatric hospital.

"The thought of the conception and realization of the work that is identified in the Giannina Gaslini Institute, which is, at the same time, an instrument of good and an act of love towards my beloved, lost Creature, in the painful memory of her precocious maternal feeling, it arose and matured in my soul in the distant 1917, in the middle of the war, in certainly not propitious conditions to such an initiative."

Gaslini sent a technical health commission across Europe to design and build a modern and cutting-edge institute. The construction of the Institute began in 1932 and lasted six years, until the start of the activities in March 1938. An estimate of the costs supported by Gaslini is around 55 million of Italian lire which correspond to several million euros.

The institute has brought further innovations also from a social point of view: Gerolamo Gaslini established that there had to be perfect equality of treatment between legitimate and illegitimate children because the right to assistance comes from the state of need and not from a social position. Furthermore, the institute has always set up a solidarity fund in favor of children and less wealthy families.

The first management experience was of a consortium. Gaslini wanted to involve local, administrative, and scientific institutions in the start of activities, thus he formed a consortium which he will have dissolved in 1946, assuming the administration of the Institute until 1960, when the first board of directors was settled. In 1949, Gerolamo Gaslini gave away all his possessions, making them flow into the homonymous foundation. The task of the Gaslini Foundation was to support over time the research and training of the Institute and to create a unitary organization in which experience, knowledge, and research would have found a ground for application. Gaslini, indeed, established the obligation for all healthcare professionals to carry out scientific research activities which, together with the use of modern techniques and machinery, would have kept the cultural infrastructure of the Institute always up-to-date. From that moment, the Gaslini Institute became the common home of all pediatricians in Italy.

In 1956, thanks to the excellent research activity, the Giannina Gaslini Institute was recognized as IRCCS (Istituto di Ricovero e Cura a Carattere Scientifico) by the Ministry of Health. It was the first Italian pediatric hospital to have ever obtained this recognition.

In 1964 Gerolamo Gaslini died and the presidency of the Foundation was assumed by his daughter Germana until 1981.

The Gaslini Institute remains separate from the Foundation.

== Structure ==
The structure is organized in pavilions surrounded by the sea of Ligurian Riviera. The project was carried out by the architect Angelo Crippa and involved a huge complex of 20 buildings on a total plot of 73,000 square meters, including extensive gardens, internal roads, and access roads. After six years of construction, these buildings now house the clinics, the university, halls for the treatment of infectious diseases, the school for pediatric nurses, and the Institute of Mental and Moral Rehabilitation of Deficient and Abnormal Childhood.

After World War II, following the damage suffered by the institute, Gerolamo Gaslini undertakes to restore its functionality and expand its capabilities. In particular, it creates five new centers of clinical investigation, treatment, and assistance (immaturity, auxology, streptomycin, orthotics, anti-poliomyelitis); four new departments: experimental surgery, pathological anatomy and histology, physiotherapy and cardiac catheterization, three new hospital departments, and three clinics; it incorporates new university hospitals such as orthopedics and traumatology.

The institute was designed, built, and furnished entirely at the expense of Mr. and Mrs. Gaslini in memory of their daughter Giannina.

The Gaslini Institute is the largest children's hospital in northern Italy and has extensive green areas on the coast, two-thirds of which are used as a park. The Gaslini employs over 2,000 staff including doctors, nurses, academics, and researchers. There are all pediatric specialties, numerous laboratories, and university chairs, many with corresponding professional schools. Since its foundation, the Gaslini has been the seat of the University of Genoa. On average there are a total of 516 beds, about 50 thousand admissions per year (between normal, day hospital, and outpatient treatment), with more than 40 thousand accesses to the emergency department in the 2nd quarter. There are about 600 foreign patients per year, on average from sixty countries of the world.

== Research ==
Research is a strategic goal of the Institute and is primarily aimed at translating research findings into clinical practice. In 2007–2008, Gaslini Institute received the coveted accreditation recognition of Joint Commission International.

In 2019, the agreement between the Giannina Gaslini Institute and the Italian Institute of Technology (IIT) will reach its operational conclusion, particularly in relation to the Joint Lab aspects of genomics, which are aspects of both high-value research and highly specialized complex diagnostics.

The Institute shows an increasing number of admissions with appropriateness criteria and a progressive increase in the volume of outpatient activities, day clinics, and day surgery provided in a structure called "Day Hospital". In 2019, 538,704 outpatient services were provided, including 14,742 ordinary admissions and 14,696 cycles of Day Hospital and Day Surgery.

Due to its nature as IRCCS, an important mission of the institute is scientific research, the results of which are published in international journals and aim to translate the latest achievements in pediatrics and pediatric specialties into clinical application.

The research activity is carried out within the 5 institutional research lines (PNR 2018-2020):

- Innovative Diagnostic Therapeutic Strategies and Rare Diseases.
- Pediatric science, surgery, and neonatology
- Rheumatology, Immunology, and Autoinflammatory Diseases
- Hematology, oncology, and cell therapies
- Muscular and neurological diseases

Among the results of Gaslini's research activity are the research findings of high scientific value of a translational nature, which, thanks to accurate diagnosis and effective therapies, have enabled treatment and prognosis of high-risk leukemia, disabling rheumatic diseases and severe nephropathies of the child.

== Notable people ==
- Giovanni De Toni (1895-1973) in 1942, he became director of the Istituto Gaslini where he revolutionized the approach to kids' medical care setting up a free ambulatory inside the hospital. He's fame rose during the spread of tuberculosis, as he was the first to find a treatment using dihydrostreptomycin. In addition, in 1946, De Toni started to elaborate a new “auxologic method” which consists of a quantified interpretation of the structural and ponderal growth disorders. In the same year De Toni also funded the School for Infants Nursary Assistants Lorenza Gaslini.
- Paolo Tolentino (1914-1983), in 1960, became chief of the infectious diseases’ clinic at the Istituto Gaslini where he was put in charge of the whole patients testing process. Moreover, he gave the start to a new branch of public health since in 1957 he published a work on hospital infections, more specifically on hepatitis, for which he designed an innovative immunologic approach that eventually brought him to a very important recognition.
- Franco Soave (1917-1984) in the latest 50s was nominated Head of Pediatric Surgery at the Istituto Gaslini. In addition, in 1960 he elaborated a surgical technique on the congenital megacolon which is used as a treatment for Hirschsprung disease. Starting from 1970 Soave has also been the president of several societies, among which the Italian Society of Pediatrics and the American Pediatric Surgical Association.
- Silvano Mastragostino (1924-1998) in 1957 he became director of the child subdivision of orthopedics at the Istituto Gaslini. In 1954, he started studying orthopedic pathologies during evolutionary age, particularly the correction of the length differences of appendages, which lead him to perform the first tibial elongation in Italy. Moreover, in 1984 Mastragostino organized a voluntary work to help kids with locomotor difficulties in Kenya and in Benin. Such dedication brought him to receive a lot of awards, among which the famous Paul Harris Fellow.

== Bibliography ==
- Anonymus, Associazione ospedali pediatrici
- Anonymus, Rete Idea, IRCCS Istituto Giannina Gaslini
- Anonymous, IRCCS network of neuroscience and neurorehabilitation,
- Anonymous, La fondazione Gaslini
- Amedeo Amato, Paolo Petralia, "Gaslini, una storia di eccellenza", RCS Libri Spa, Milano 2013
- Lucia Barabino, Giannina Gaslini, in “Ti racconto uno storia”, 2018
- Luca Borghi, Antonio Infante, (eds.), Ai bambini e ai fiori, lo splendore del sole. Il ruolo dell'Istituto Gaslini nella storia della pediatria, Rizzoli, Milano 2015
- Luca Borghi, Sense of humors: the human factor in the history of medicine, SEU, 2012
- Margherita De Bac, La storia di Gerolamo Gaslini, fondatore dell’ospedale pediatrico, in “ Il corriere della sera”,2015
- Lia Fubini, Rockefeller di Genova. Storia di Gaslini, in “Sbilanciamoci”, 2010
- Antonio Infante, Paolo Lingua, "Gaslini. Settantacinque anni per la vita", Rizzoli, Milano 2013
- Ing.Bruno Musso, dott.Ugo Serra, Em.za Card.Dionigi Tettamanzi, Giuliana Traverso, Microart's, S.p.A- Recco, Genova, 2001
- Fiasco, Federazione Italiana Aziende Sanitarie e Ospedaliere, IRCCS Istituto Giannina Gaslini
- Emanuela Oldoni, Eatris, IRCCS Istituto Giannina Gaslini
- Gabriele Rastaldo, 82 anni di Ospedale Gaslini! Quando fu fondato, da chi e perché?, in “Il Mugugno genovese”, May 15, 2020
- Gianluca Riguzzi, InGenioBuongiorno: 142 anni fa nacque Gerolamo Gaslini, in “ingenio”, 2019
- AdnKronos Salute, Nasce dal dolore di un padre l'Istituto Gaslini di Genova, ora la storia in un libro, In “Focus”, 2015
