= San Filippo Neri Hospital =

Hospital in Rome

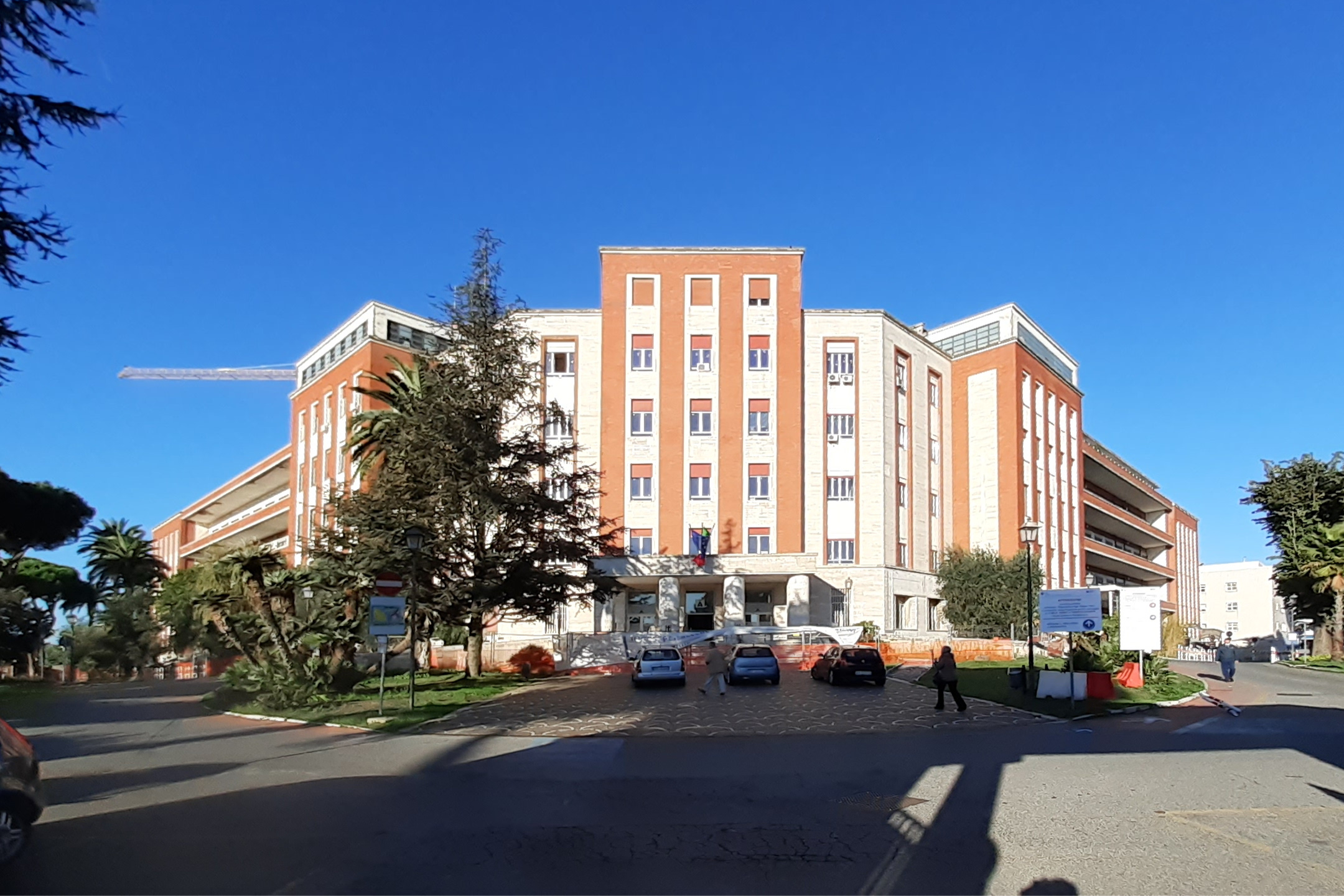
- Entrance to the hospital

Geography
- Location: Via Giovanni Martinotti 20, Rome, Lazio, Italy
- Coordinates: 41°56′52.02″N 12°24′50.21″E

Services
- Emergency department: Yes
- Beds: 392

History
- Founded: 1940; 86 years ago

Links
- Lists: Hospitals in Italy

The San Filippo Neri Hospital is an Italian public hospital that is part of the Local Health Authority Rome 1. It is located in Ottavia and serves the northwestern sector of the capital with its regular inpatient wards, day hospital, and day surgery.

== History ==
The San Filippo Neri Hospital was built in 1940 and then expanded in the 1960s.

On July 1, 1994, the hospital became a “hospital of national importance and high specialization” following recognition for its highly specialized activities, such as neurosurgery and intensive neurology, cardiology, cardiac surgery, and oncology. At the same time, the hospital was established as a hospital company, pursuant to Article 6 of Regional Law No. 18 of June 16, 1994, thus acquiring public legal status and entrepreneurial autonomy, and took the name of Azienda complesso ospedaliero San Filippo Neri ospedale di rilievo nazionale e di alta specializzazione (English: San Filippo Neri Hospital Complex, a hospital of national importance and high specialization).

It is currently home to regional reference centers for:

- oncology;
- cardiology;
- vascular surgery;
- neurosurgery.

Since 2000, the Neurosurgery Unit has been performing minimally invasive computer-assisted neurosurgery for the treatment of tumors of the central nervous system. Using software introduced by Shahram Sherkat, all brain neoplastic diseases are diagnosed and treated with microsurgical and targeted approaches. The Neurosurgery Unit at San Filippo Neri is also a reference center for stereotactic neurosurgery. There is also an integrated multi-specialty clinic dedicated to the care of patients with brain tumors, an Alzheimer's assessment unit, part of the Ministry of Health's Cronos project, and a clinical nutrition center.

Following the corporate reorganization, a series of structural redesigns of the hospital complex were initiated, with a complete overhaul of the internal layout of pavilions A and B, both from a construction and plant engineering point of view. The new building C was then activated to house the Level II Emergency and Admissions Department (DEA).

Although it has undergone numerous renovations and extensions, the original building still bears traces of architectural symbols typical of the Fascist era, such as the fasces on the facade of the main entrance.
