= Ospedale G. Capilupi =

Geography
- Location: Via Provinciale, Anacapri, Capri, Italy
- Coordinates: 40°33′0″N 14°14′11″E

Organisation
- Type: General

Links
- Lists: Hospitals in Italy

Ospedale Giuseppe Capilupi Capri is a hospital (Italian: Ospedale) on the Via Provinciale in Anacapri, Capri, located just to the west of the comune center and about half a kilometre north of the Marina Piccola. It's the hospital of the island.
