= Ivano-Kuvalat =

Ivano-Kuvalat Ивано-Кувалат
- Selo
- Location within Bashkortostan Location within Russia
- Coordinates: 52°37′N 57°28′E
- Country: Russia
- Region: Bashkortostan
- District: Zilairsky District
- Time zone: UTC+5:00

Ivano-Kuvalat (Russian: Ивано-Кувалат; Bashkir: Иван-Ҡыуалат, İvan-Qıwalat) is a rural locality (a selo) in Ivano-Kuvalatsky Selsoviet, Zilairsky District, Bashkortostan, Russia. The population was 430 as of 2010. There are 7 streets.

== Geography ==
Ivano-Kuvalat is located 50 km north of Zilair (the district's administrative centre) by road. Krasny Kushak is the nearest rural locality.
