= San Giovanni Rotondo =

- Comune
- Comune di San Giovanni Rotondo
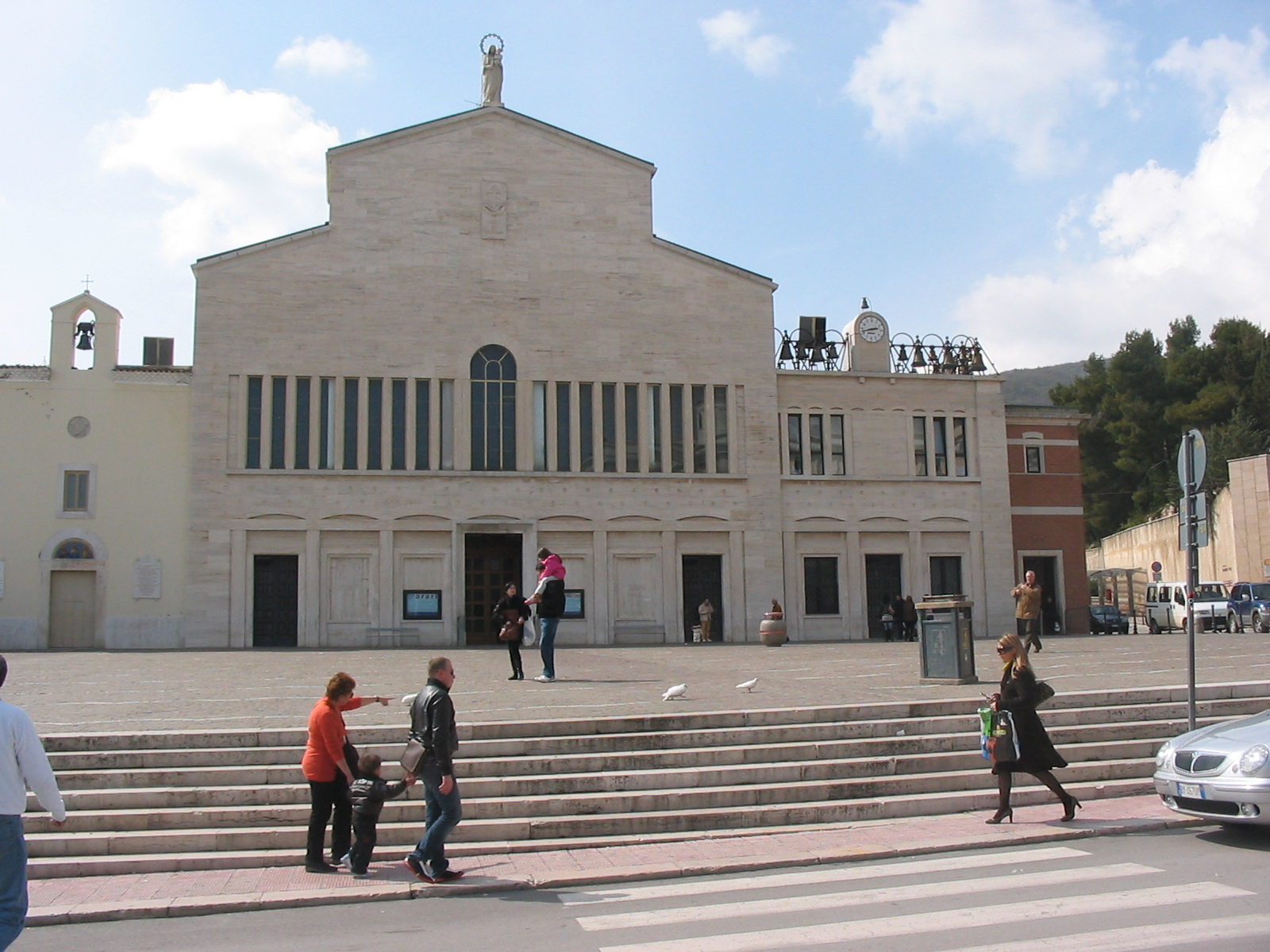
- The Church-Shrine of Saint Mary of Graces and the Convent of Saint Padre Pio of Pietrelcina

- Coat of arms

- Location within Italy Location within Apulia
- Coordinates: 41°42′N 15°44′E
- Country: Italy
- Region: Apulia
- Province: Foggia (FG)
- Frazioni: Matine

Government
  - Mayor: Floriana Natale

Area
  - Total: 261.88 km^{2} (101.11 sq mi)
- Elevation: 565 m (1,854 ft)

Population (28 February 2017)
  - Total: 27,124
  - Density: 103.57/km^{2} (268.26/sq mi)
- Demonym(s): Sangiovannesi, Sangiuannari (dialect)
- Time zone: UTC+1 (CET)
  - Summer (DST): UTC+2 (CEST)
- Postal code: 71013
- Dialing code: 0882
- Patron saint: St. John the Baptist
- Saint day: 24 June
- Website: Official website

San Giovanni Rotondo is the name of a town and comune in the province of Foggia and region of Apulia, in southern Italy.

San Giovanni Rotondo was the home of Saint Pio of Pietrelcina from 28 July 1916 until his death on 23 September 1968. The Padre Pio Pilgrimage Church was built in devotion to the saint and dedicated on 1 July 2004. The town hosts a hospital and medical-research centre Casa Sollievo della Sofferenza (Home for the Relief of the Suffering) founded by Saint Pio of Pietrelcina.

The nearby Sanctuary of Saint Michael the Archangel is also the site of Catholic pilgrimages and was visited by Pope John Paul II in 1987.

== International relations ==
San Giovanni Rotondo is twinned with:

- Pietrelcina in Italy, since 2005
- Wadowice in Poland, since 2006
- (Italy) Monte Sant'Angelo, since 2013

== Notable people ==
- Ivano Ciano (born 1983), Italian footballer
- Claudio Damiani, Italian poet
- Michele Pirro (born 1986), Italian MotoGP rider
