= Mount Lefre =

Mountain in the southeastern part of Lagorai Chain in Trentino, Italy

Monte Lefre
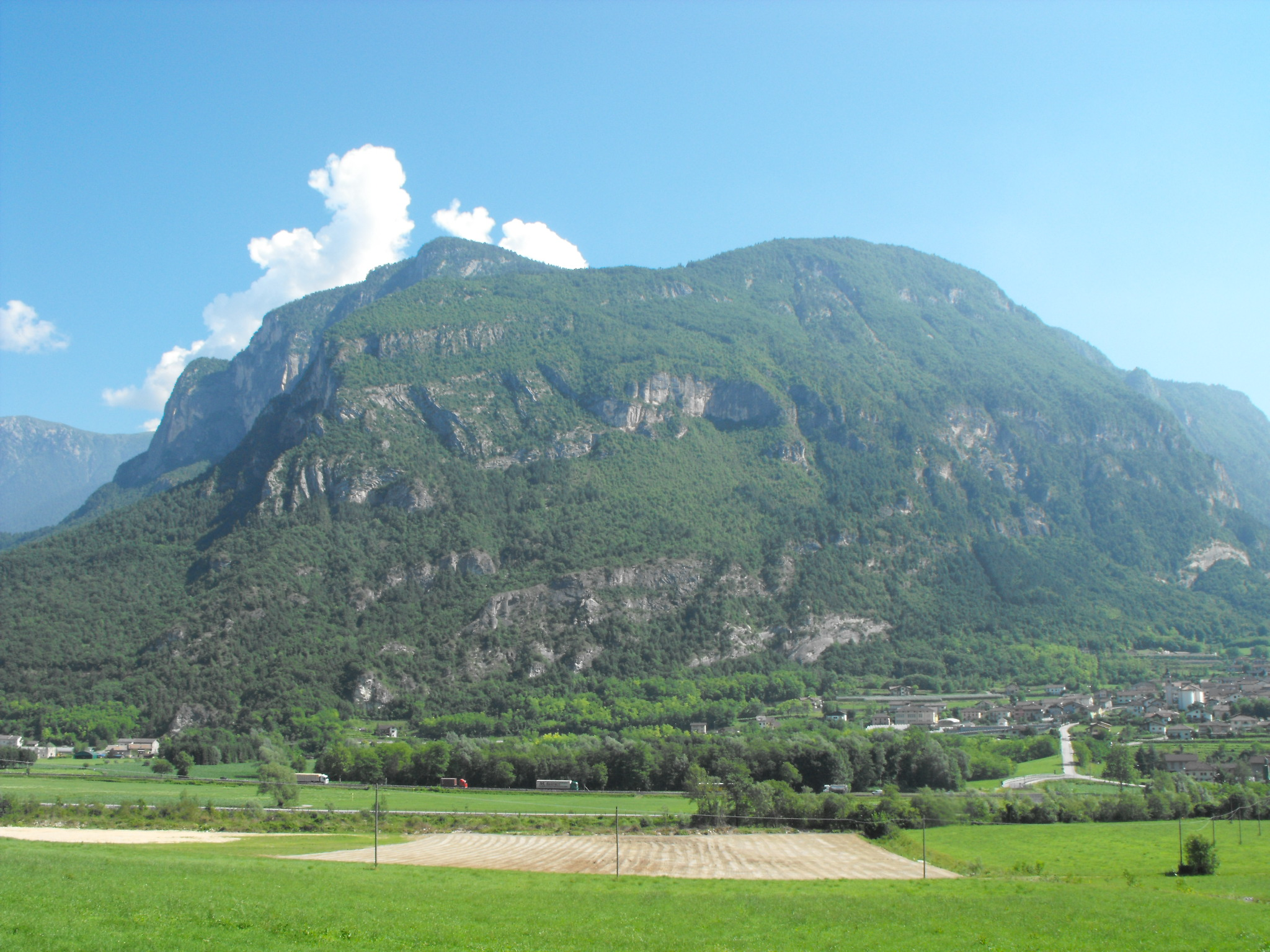
- South face of Mount Lefre

Highest point
- Prominence: 945 m (3,100 ft)
- Coordinates: 46°03′34″N 11°32′56″E

Naming
- English translation: Lefre Mount
- Language of name: Italian

Geography
- Location: Trentino-Alto Adige, Trento, Italy
- Parent range: Eastern and Southeastern Alps

Mount Lefre (or simply Léfre) (1305 MSL) is a mountain in the southeastern part of the Lagorai Chain in Trentino.

Located mainly in Valsugana and partly in the Tesino Plateau, it is divided between the municipalities of Castel Ivano, Ospedaletto, and Pieve Tesino.

== Description ==
=== Geographic boundaries ===
Mount Lefre is located in the eastern part of Valsugana, marking the westernmost point of the mountain ridge that then continues toward the east with Mount Mèzza, Mount Cismón, Mount Silàna, Mount Picòsta, and Mount Celàdo. From the western face of the Lefre, the Valsugana varies its orientation toward the southeast, while along its northern slope pass the most used access routes to the Tesino.

The flow of the Chieppena stream marks the northern and western limits of the mountain, the southern limit slopes down into the valley floor of the Valsugana (with the course of the Brenta river), while the eastern limit is represented by the Val Bronzale, the conoid between the Lefre the Monte Mezza on which the town of Ospedaletto rises. The meeting point between the two mountains to the northeast consists of a fork, immediately north of which rises the pass of the same name.

Along the slopes of the mountain rise (from the north counterclockwise) the villages of Pradellano, Ivano Fracena, Agnedo, and Ospedaletto. The only access road to the summit passable by motor vehicles is the SC1, which branches off from the SP78 “del Tesino” in the locality of Pradellano and arrives, after 5.4 km near the Monte Lefre Refuge.

=== Geology ===
Geologically, Lefre consists of limestone rocks, which distinguishes it from the Cima d'Asta Massif to the north (composed mainly of granitic rocks) and the Altipiani Group to the south. The limestones that compose Mt. Lefre are mostly Triassic dolomites on which Jurassic and Cretaceous limestones and marls rest. These rocks of marine origin began to accumulate when the sea covered the territory currently occupied by the Alps, a phase that began at the end of the great eruptions of the Lower Permian.

The limestones and marls in the mountain are especially thickly stratified whitish and red flakes; they, present especially in the upper part of the mountain, give the summit a gentle and level morphology. Below, the presence of Jurassic limestones makes the walls steep and landslideable, especially the western one.

=== Flora and fauna ===
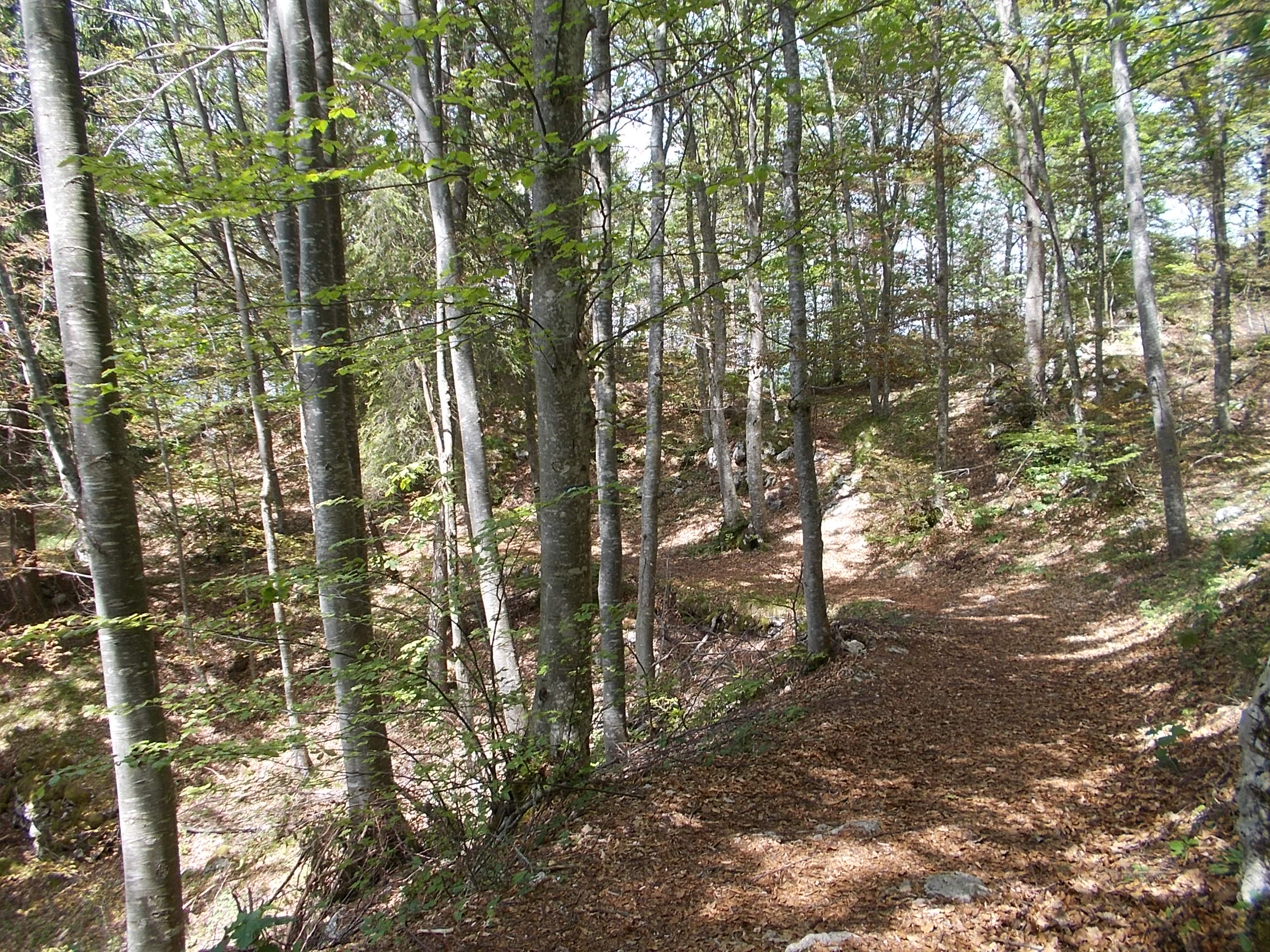
Beech forest.

The vegetation that develops on the mountain is typical of a temperate forest of the suboceanic climate, due to the east-west orientation of the Valsugana, which prevents the arrival of the humid air masses that come up along the Po Valley from the Adriatic Sea. The most common trees in the lower part are black hornbeam and manna ash, alternating with some groups of lodgepole pine and chestnut trees. In the upper reaches of the mountain, there is no shortage of beech forests, spruce, and larch. In the grasslands on the summit and along the southern slope, maintained by agro-sylva-pastoral activity, there are shrubs and flowers typical of alpine flora, such as peony, gentian, and alpine cyclamen. The forests are also rich in different varieties of mushrooms.

The habitat of the mountain allows the presence of numerous species of animals, especially birds; several species of woodpeckers nest in the mountain's trees, and there is no shortage of grouse. The underbrush is populated by several species of rodents, including the dormouse and the driomio. Many mustelid species, such as marten, beech marten, badger, least weasel, and weasel, are also present in the forests. Larger wild animals include the roe deer. Human farming activities favor the presence of cows, domestic goats, and sheep, especially during the summer season.

=== History ===
Settlements and religious buildings developed along the slopes of the mountain as early as ancient times. Still, the most certain evidence dates back to the late Middle Ages, where the presence of a xenodochium for wayfarers called Hospitalis Careni is noted, from which the present toponym of the village of Ospedaletto derives.

Mount Lefre assumed an important strategic role during World War I, beginning with Italy's entry into the conflict. At the start of hostilities between Italy and Austria-Hungary in 1915, the line of war shifted further west than the previous border, so Mount Lefre immediately came under Italian control. Here the Royal Army built fortifications for observation of the entire Valsugana and Tesino, as well as for possible attacks toward Austro-Hungarian positions on Mount Ortigara, Cima XII, and the Panarotta. In 1916 the mountain was the headquarters of the 84th Infantry Regiment “Venezia”, which set up cannons and howitzers there on the peak in a westerly direction, along the south face, and on the Forcella pass. The entire territory returned under Austrian control in the fall of 1917, following the retreat of the border into the Venetian plain following the Battle of Caporetto, and then became definitively Italian at the end of the conflict in 1918.

Always prone to landslides due to its geological nature, the west face of the mountain is being monitored by the Civil Protection of the Autonomous Province of Trento. The same has also provided blasting for the detachment of portions of rock dangerous to inhabited centers, as occurred, for example, on November 21, 2014. On the night of October 28-29, 2018, several hectares of forest were razed to the ground by the passage of Storm Vaia, which on the Lefre hit mainly the summit and the south face.

== Excursionism ==
=== Pathways ===
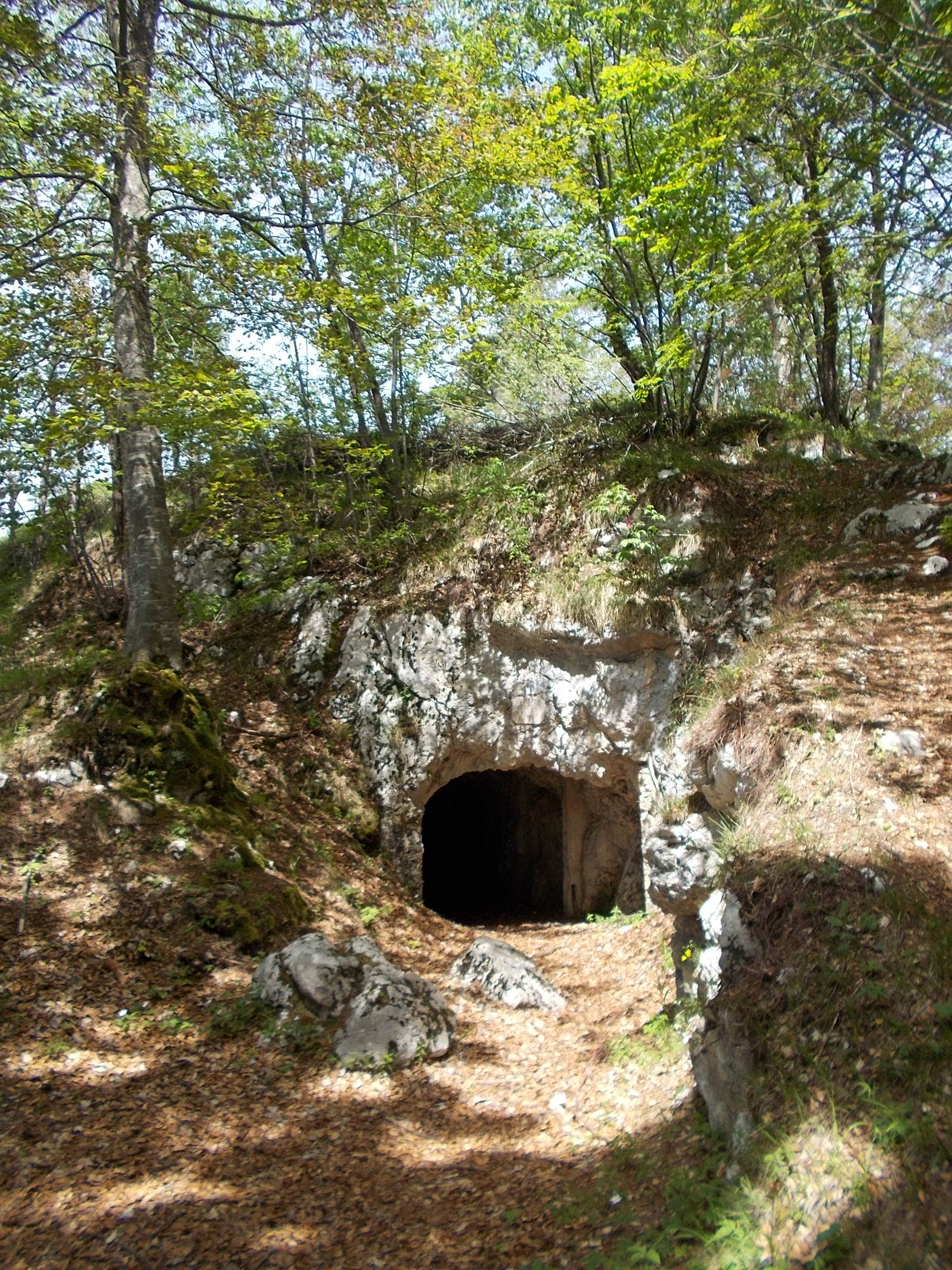
World War I fortification.

Mt. Lefre is traversed by numerous forest trails as well as two hiking trails managed by the Borgo Valsugana and Tesino sections of the SAT, which are suitable for everyone and frequented especially in summer and fall:

- Pathway 329: From Fracena (447 MSL) to Mount Lefre Refuge (1282 MSL) - difficulty E - length: 5 560 meters.

Starting from the village of Fracena, following the road in an easterly direction you enter the forest until you visit the church of San Vendemiano. Following the sheep track that climbs along the southern slope, you overlook the built-up area of Ospedaletto, reaching the junction for the Orco Bridge. From this point the path becomes a steep mule track; you pass near a capital in the rock dedicated to St. Anthony and war work from the Great War. Before reaching Rifugio Monte Lefre, you cross meadows with huts, such as Prati dei Floriani and Prati di Sopra, and the small church of the Alpini.

- Pathway 330: From the locality Drio Castello (933 MSL) to the summit (1305 MSL) - difficulty E - length 4 770 m.

Starting from the Forcella pass, you reach the village of Drio Castello, from which a steep forest road branches off. Having passed the northern slope of Sasso Rosso, turn onto the road that leads to Malga Campivolo di Valle. The trail continues with changes in gradient to Prati di Sopra, where it rejoins trail 329, and then continues to the Cimone viewpoint.

=== Points of interest ===
==== Cimone viewpoint ====
Approximately 700 meters from the Monte Lefre Refuge is the Cimone viewpoint, located on the highest point of the west face. From this viewpoint, it is possible to see much of the territory of the Valsugana and Tesino Community, as well as many of the peaks of the Lagorai and the Highlands Group.

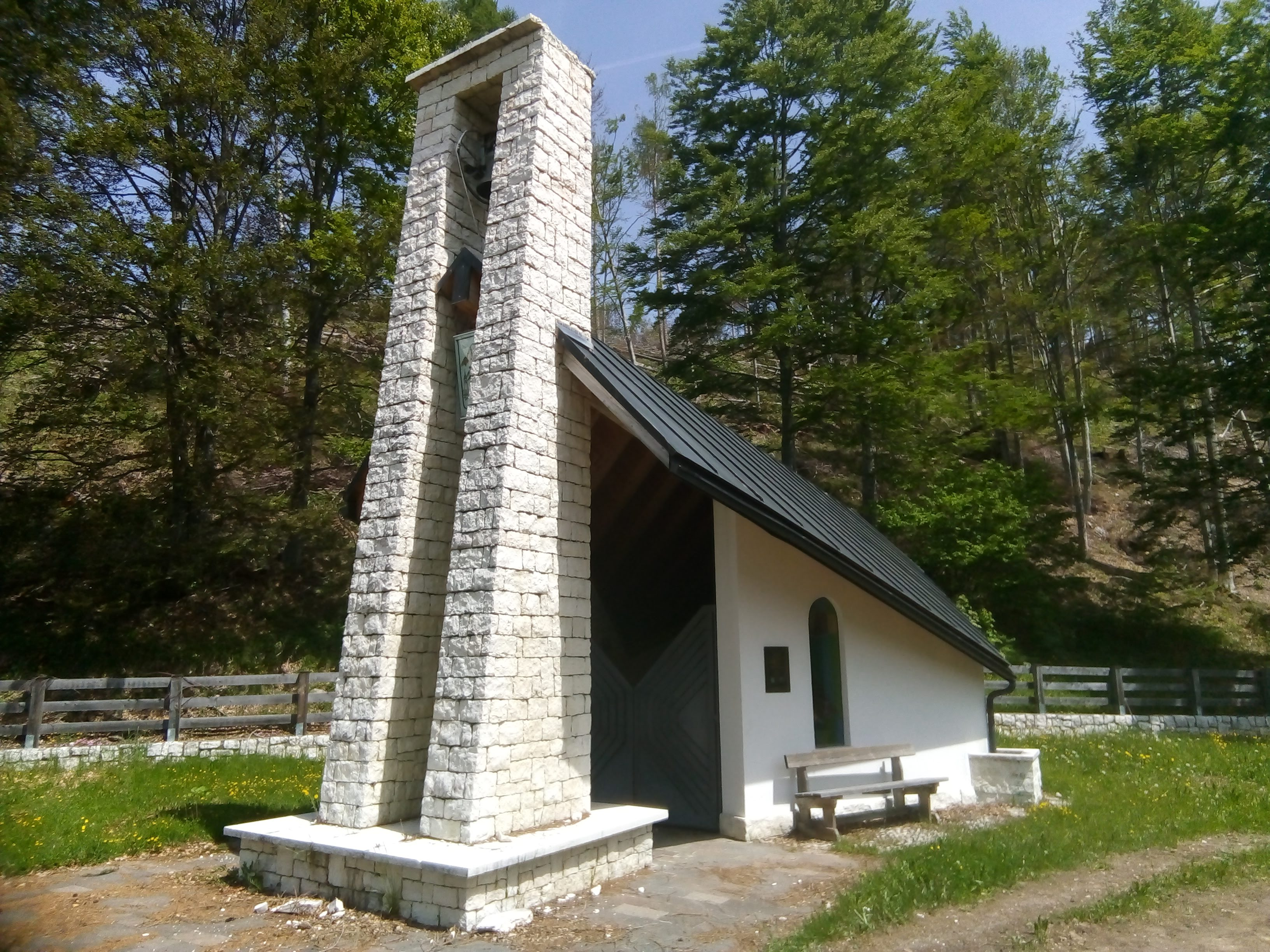
Little church of the Alpini.

==== Little church of the Alpini ====
Built-in 2003 by the local sections of Villa Agnedo and Ivano Fracena of the National Alpine Association, it looks like a small structure made of concrete, stone, and wood. The bell tower is located in a frontal position concerning the entrance to the chapel, while worthy of note is the east wall located behind the altar, which features a stained glass window in the shape of a cross in the center.

==== Church of San Vendemiano ====
East of the village of Fracena, in an elevated position above the town, stands a small church whose presence is documented from the 16th century, the seat of hermits. The church was rebuilt by the lords of Castel Ivano in the 17th century, later being severely damaged during the Great War. Its present appearance dates back to restorations in 1922 and 1981. The structure has a pitched roof with a covering made of shingles. The portico is made of cylindrical columns, and the exterior masonry has numerous traces of ancient frescoes. In the clearing in front, the east side of the manor house of Ivano Castle can be seen.

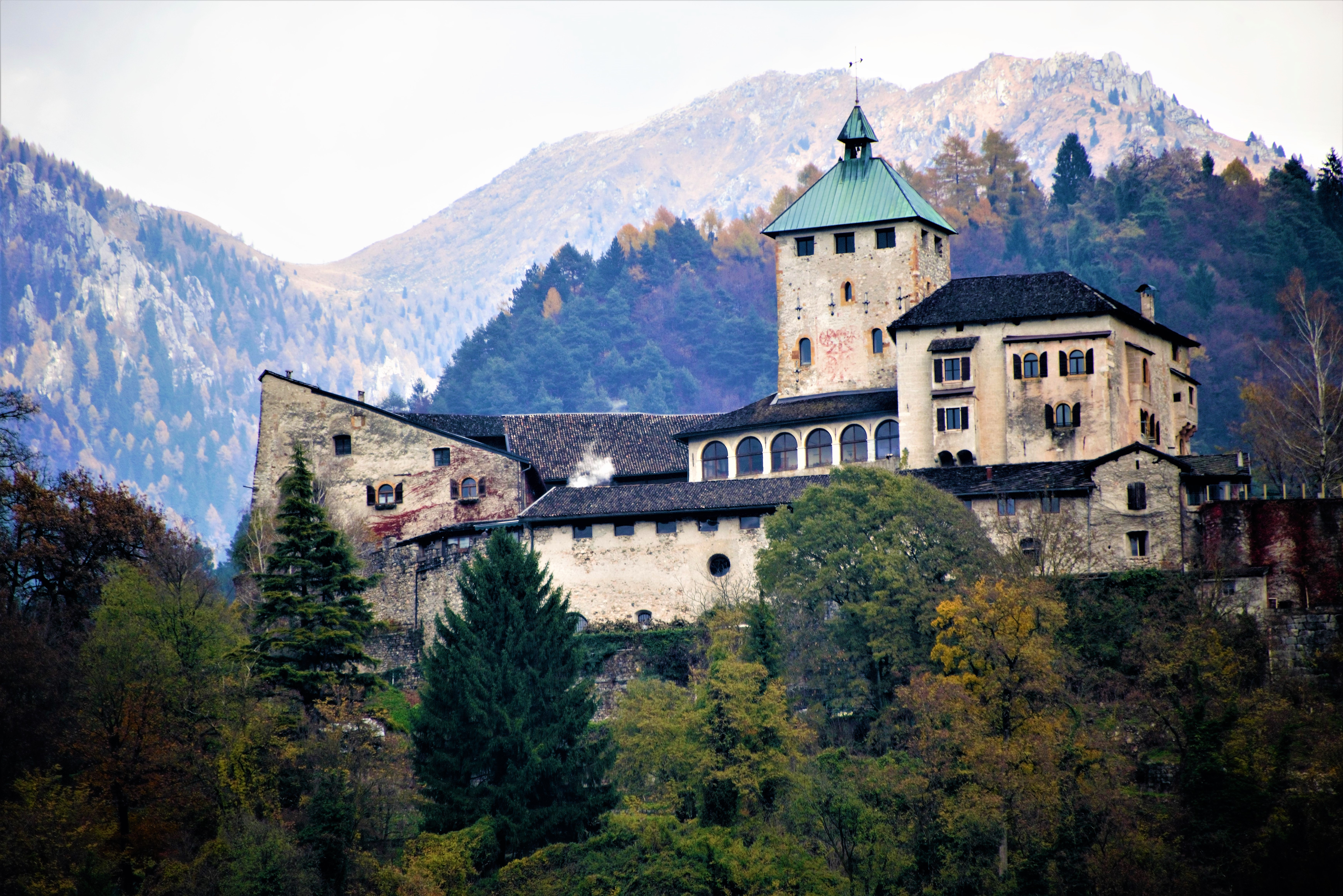
Castle Ivano

==== Castle Ivano ====
On top of a hill at the foot of the western wall of the mountain stands Castel Ivano, an important military structure dating back to the 6th century. The complex was for centuries the seat of the lords who ruled over the surrounding territory (called precisely “Department of Ivano”) after having been owned by several important families of the Renaissance period. The imposing keep overlooking the valley still bears the coat of arms of the Da Carrara family.

==== Orc Bridge ====
The Orco Bridge is a natural bridge that came into being due to erosion of the surrounding material, leaving an arch spanning about 60 meters. The bridge's body is about 12 meters thick and 4 meters wide on its back. The walkable area (over which a path passes) is 72.5 meters long, while the bridge rises 37 meters above the ground. Local legend about the bridge's origin has it that the devil, in the form of an ogre, made the bridge in response to the request of a shepherd who wished to pass his flock across the escarpment; the ogre thus accomplished the work, in exchange, however, for the shepherd's soul. The Orc Bridge can be reached from Fracena by a detour from path 329 or via a path from the village of Ospedaletto.

== See also ==
- Lagorai
- Trentino
- Valsugana
- Castel Ivano
- Ospedaletto, Trentino
- Pieve Tesino
- Trentino-Alto Adige/Südtirol

== Bibliography ==
- SAT, Società Degli Alpinisti Tridentini (2013). "...per sentieri e luoghi sui monti del Trentino vol.2" [...for trails and places in the mountains of Trentino.]. Alpinia.net (in Italian).
- Largaiolli, Tullio (1992). Analisi di stabilità del versante roccioso occidentale del Monte Lefre in Valsugana [Stability analysis of the western rock slope of Mount Lefre in Valsugana.] (in Italian). Trento: Tridentine Museum of Natural Sciences.
- Montebello, Giuseppe Andrea (1793). Notizie storiche, topografiche e religiose della Valsugana e di Primiero [Historical, topographical and religious news of Valsugana and Primiero] (in Italian). la Biblioteca Pubblica Bavarese: Marchesani.
