= Monte Fravort =

Mountain in Italy

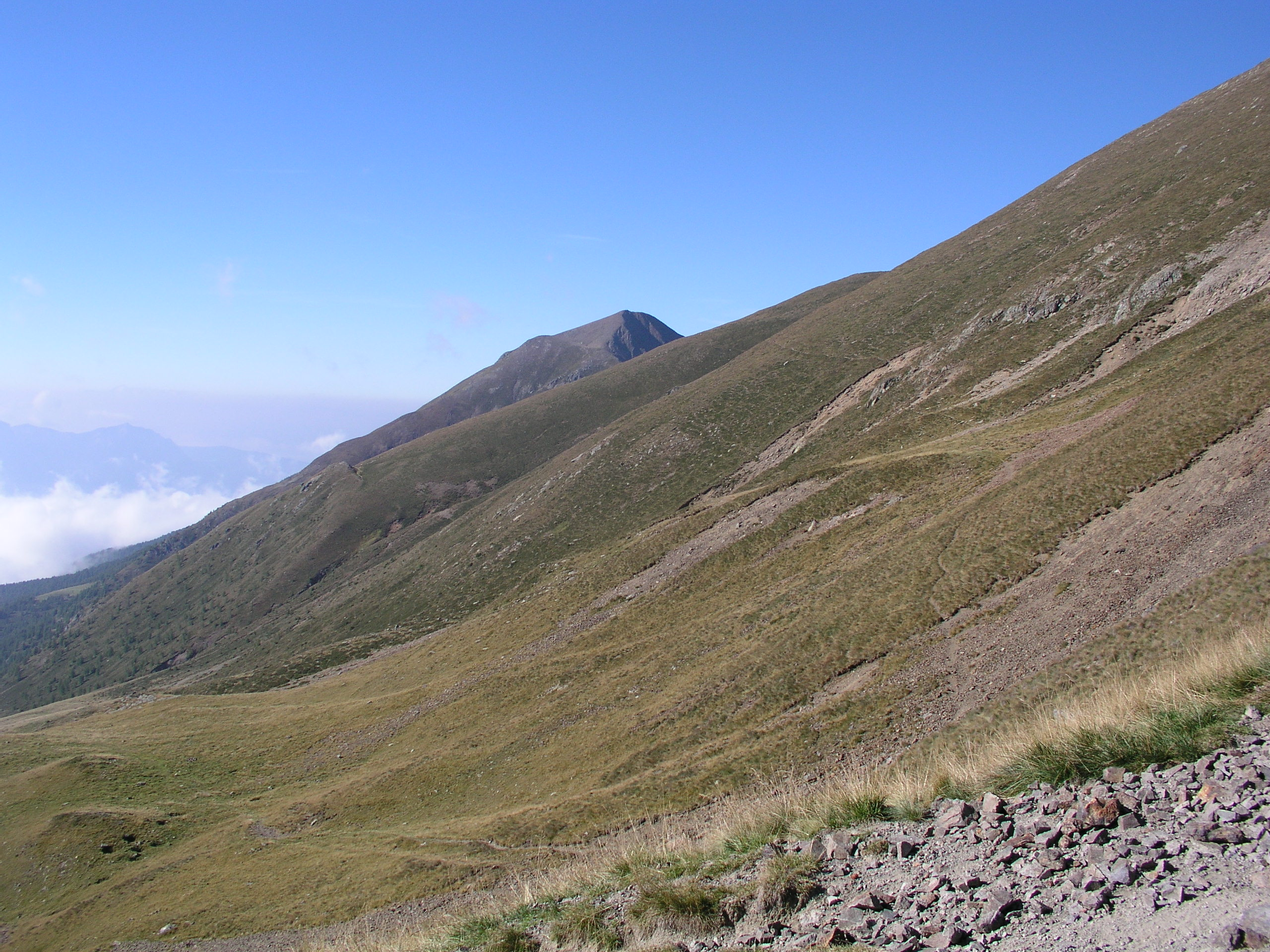
- Monte Fravort seen from Passo dela Portela

Highest point
- Elevation: 2,347 m (7,700 ft)

Geography
- Location: Trentino, Italy
- Parent range: Fiemme Dolomites

Monte Fravort, also known as Hoabort in Mòcheno, is a mountain of Trentino, Italy, with an elevation of 2,347 metres (7,700 ft). It is located in the southern Fiemme Dolomites, in the Province of Trento.

The mountain, along with Monte Gronlait, Oscivart and Hoabonti, closes the Bersntol to the east, and its peak marks the tripoint between Fierozzo, Frassilongo and Roncegno Terme.

Monte Fravort was on the frontline between Italy and Austria-Hungary during World War I. In 2009-2010 the trenches and barracks on the Panarotta were restored by the province of Trento.

A small mountain shelter was built just below the peak in 2021. The peak can be reached on foot from Rifugio Serot (Roncegno Terme) or from the Panarotta.
