= Ospedaletto, Trentino =

Ospedaletto
- Comune
- Comune di Ospedaletto
- Coat of arms

- Location within Italy Location within Trentino-Alto Adige/Südtirol
- Coordinates: 46°3′N 11°33′E
- Country: Italy
- Region: Trentino-Alto Adige/Südtirol
- Province: Trentino (TN)

Government
  - Mayor: Licciardiello Edy

Area
  - Total: 16.8 km^{2} (6.5 sq mi)

Population (2026)
  - Total: 792
  - Density: 47.1/km^{2} (122/sq mi)
- Time zone: UTC+1 (CET)
  - Summer (DST): UTC+2 (CEST)
- Postal code: 38050
- Dialing code: 0461
- Website: Official website

Ospedaletto (Ospedaléto in local dialect) is a comune (municipality) in Trentino in the northern Italian region of Trentino-Alto Adige/Südtirol, located about 35 kilometres (22 mi) east of Trento. As of 31 December 2004, it had a population of 807 and an area of 16.8 square kilometres (6.5 mi^{2}).

Ospedaletto borders the following municipalities: Pieve Tesino, Cinte Tesino, Ivano-Fracena, Villa Agnedo, Grigno and Asiago.

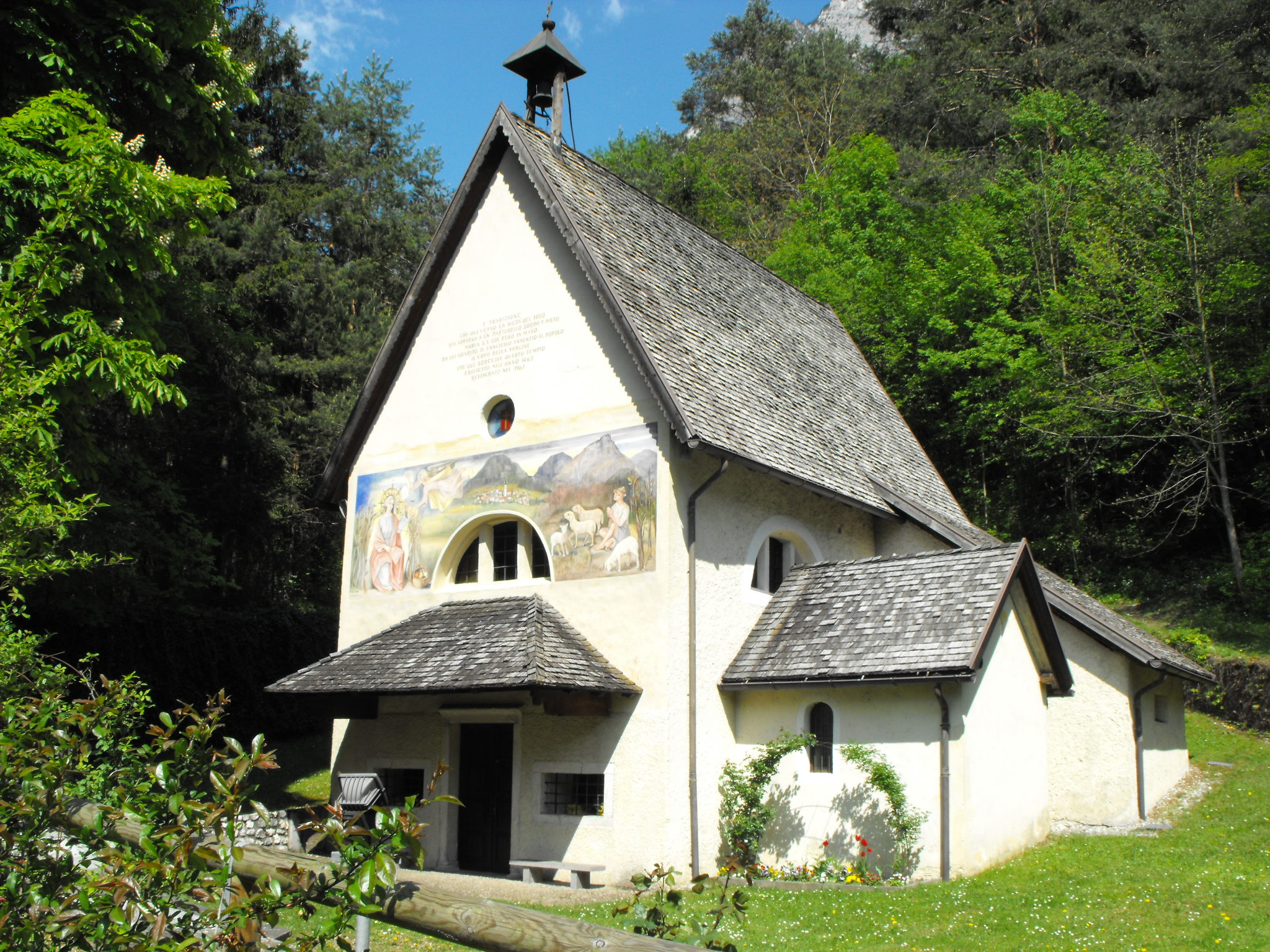
Church of Madonna della Rocchetta

== Demographic evolution ==
Historical population

Year	Pop.	±%
1861	?	—
1871	?	—
1881	?	—
1901	?	—
1911	?	—

Year	Pop.	±%
1921	954	—
1931	860	−9.9%
1936	798	−7.2%
1951	841	+5.4%
1961	808	−3.9%

Year	Pop.	±%
1971	784	−3.0%
1981	762	−2.8%
1991	757	−0.7%
2001	832	+9.9%

Source: Data from ISTAT
