= Lake delle Buse =

Glacial lake in Trentino, Italy

Lago delle Buse
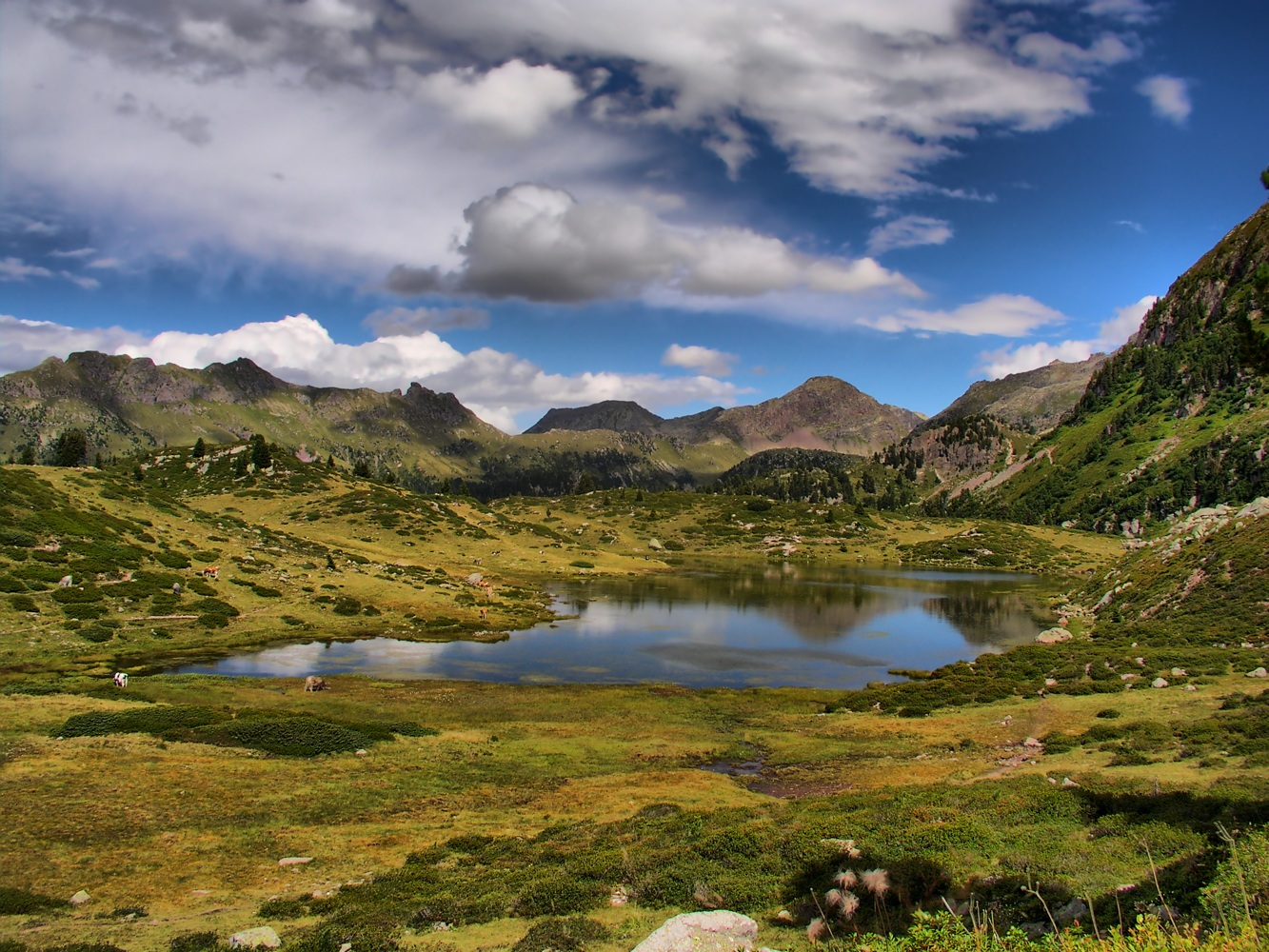
- Interactive map of Lago delle Buse
- Location: Castello-Molina di Fiemme, Fiemme Valley, Trentino, Italy
- Coordinates: 46°10′41.322″N 11°27′17.168″E
- Type: Glacial lake

Lago delle Buse is a small alpine lake of glacial origin, located near Manghen Pass, at 2,066 m (6,778 ft) above sea level, with a surface area of approximately 10,000 m^{2} (110,000 sq ft).

From a cadastral point of view, it is located in the municipality of Castello-Molina di Fiemme and during the First World War it was a place of conflict because it was located on the Austrian line that ran along the entire Lagorai chain.

== Geography ==
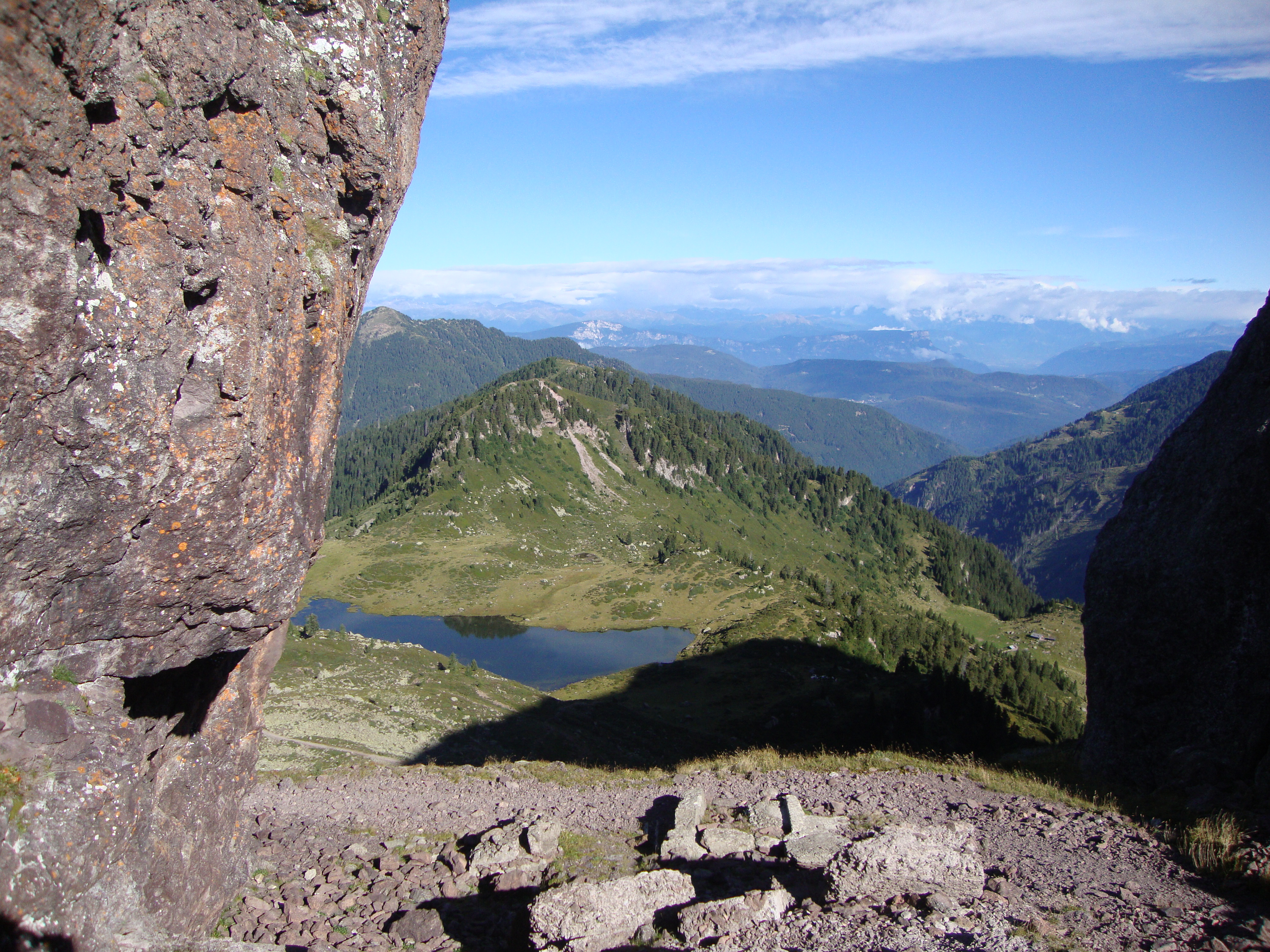
Lago delle Buse from Forcella Ziolera

The lake is located at the top of the Val Cadino, a side valley of the Fiemme Valley, in the heart of the Lagorai chain. It was formed as a result of numerous glaciations that gave rise, in the area, to another ninety small lakes. The body of water is located under the northern slopes of Monte Ziolera, its pass, and Cima Buse Todesche; it is reachable via the SAT trail No. 322, in about 45 minutes from Manghen Pass.

== Vegetation ==
The surrounding vegetation is of low stature, typical of the alpine zone, consisting of rhododendron, juniper, and bilberry. In the vicinity, there are also herbaceous species of Carex, varying by position: C. rostrata in drier areas, C. fusca and C. echinata closer to the water. In the arboreal state, the Swiss pine (Pinus cembra) is frequent. The lake is a habitat for numerous animals such as the common frog, the alpine newt, and various types of dragonflies. The fauna also includes chamois, rock partridge, marmot, and stoat. The shores of the lake host a peat bog, with blooms of cotton grass (Eriophorum). The basin, which is slowly becoming marshy, is an example of an oligotrophic environment; indeed, it hosts various organisms under conditions of extreme nutrient scarcity. The surrounding rock is of porphyritic type, with a dark coloration tending to violet.

== History ==
=== Mesolithic ===
The oldest finds discovered in the area date back to the Mesolithic period. Three sites are distinguished: in the first, located in the saddle to the northwest about 100 m (330 ft) from the lake, and in the second, on the shore of the lake, carbonaceous concentrations, flakes, and containment stones have been found, testifying to the presence of hearths. The third site is located a little further away, to the west, and features an excavation with many flint artifacts.

=== First World War ===
Significant findings in the area date back to the First World War.

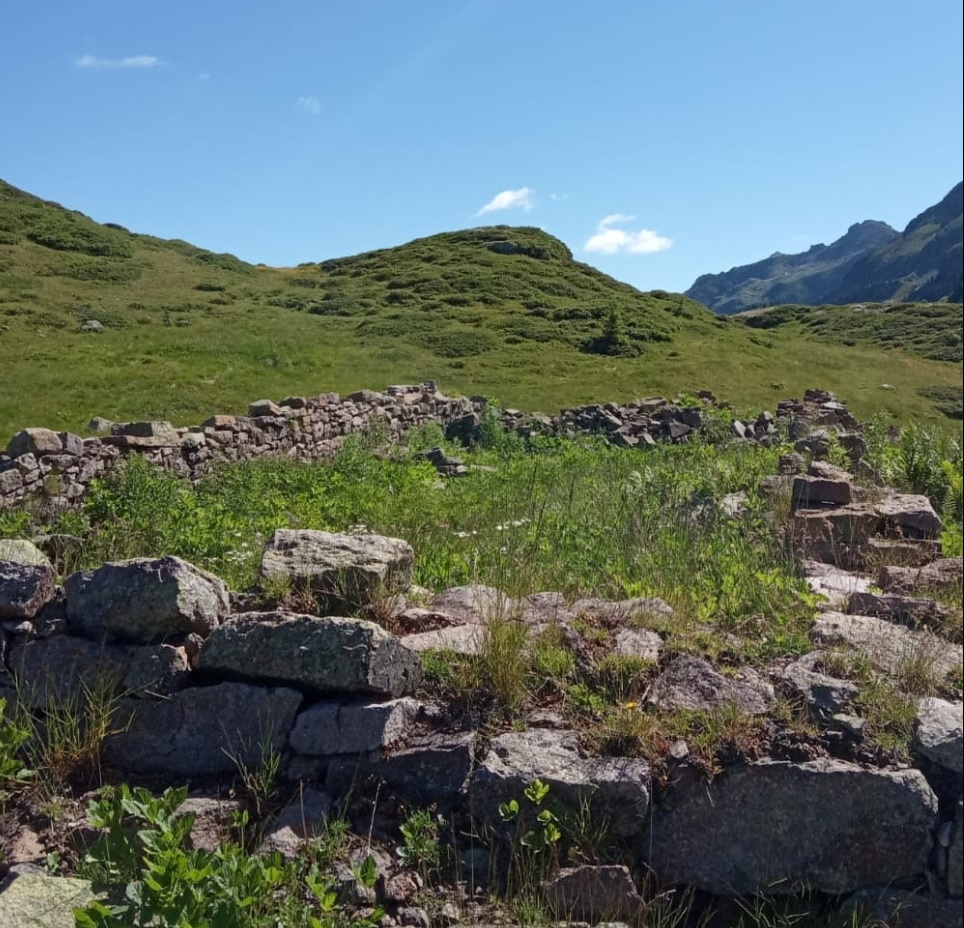
Remains of the "Casa dei Trogheri" near the lake

Around the lake and in its vicinity were located the rear and front-line positions for the defense of the Manghen Pass sector, used by the Standschützen, companies of riflemen. Continuing along the north-eastern ridge of the mountain, the remains of the command and kitchens of the Standschützen battalion Auer can be recognized. On the SAT trail No. 322 towards east-southeast, ruins of trenches, barracks, and remains of the lodging of the Austro-Hungarian military chaplain can be distinguished. Reaching Forcella Ziolera, we find an intermediate station of the cable car that supplied Cima Valpiana from the lake, while a little lower down, the remains of the command and a series of four artillery emplacements in concrete and stone can be seen. At this point, a small-caliber battery was positioned with a firing range on the Italian lines towards Val Campelle, and nearby stand the remains of the command of "Kaiserjäger Streifkompanie No. 3", which held the garrison of Monte Valpiana between 1915 and 1916.

Finally, near the north-western shore of the lake, a stone perimeter indicates the location of the "Casa dei Trogheri", that is, the lodging of Russian prisoners employed by the Austrians for supplying the front line, despite the prohibition of the 1907 Hague Convention which stipulated that prisoners should have no relation with military operations. The name of this structure derives from the German verb "tragen", meaning "to carry".

== Bibliography ==
- "Lago delle Buse". Autonomous Province of Trento (in Italian).
- Dalmeri, Giampaolo; Lanzinger, Michele (1991). "Il mesolitico del Lagorai nell'area del Lago delle Buse, prospezioni e sondaggi" [The Mesolithic of Lagorai in the area of Lago delle Buse, surveys and soundings]. Preistoria Alpina (in Italian). 25: 219–222.
- "Forcella Ziolera and Monte Valpiana". Italian Historical War Museum (in Italian).
- "Lungo i sentieri Valsugana Lagorai" [Along the paths of Valsugana Lagorai] (PDF). Mountain Academy of Trentino (in Italian). Archived from the original (PDF) on 28 January 2021.
- Girotto, Luca; Gioppi, Franco (2007). Itinerari della Grande Guerra in Valsugana Orientale e Tesino [Itineraries of the Great War in Eastern Valsugana and Tesino] (in Italian). Scurelle, TN: Tipografia Litodelta.
- Girotto, Luca (1995). La lunga trincea, 1915-1918: cronache della grande guerra dalla Valsugana alla Val di Fiemme : Cima di Vezzena, Panarotta, Catena Lagorai, Cima d'Asta, Cauriol [The long trench, 1915-1918: chronicles of the great war from Valsugana to Val di Fiemme : Cima di Vezzena, Panarotta, Lagorai Chain, Cima d'Asta, Cauriol] (in Italian). Novale di Valdagno, VI: Rossato. ISBN 9788881300426.
- Zangerl, Corinna; Leoni, Diego, eds. (1987). "Prigionieri russi e serbi nel Tirolo meridionale" [Russian and Serbian prisoners in Southern Tyrol]. Cosa videro quegli occhi! : uomini e donne in guerra: 1913-1920 [What those eyes saw! : men and women at war: 1913-2020] (in Italian). Rovereto, TN: Laboratorio di storia di Rovereto. pp. 123–137. ISBN 9788897402558.
- Leoni, Diego (2015). La guerra verticale: uomini, animali e macchine sul fronte di montagna: 1915 - 1918 [The vertical war: men, animals, and machines on the mountain front: 1915 - 1918] (in Italian). Turin: Einaudi. ISBN 9788858420928.
- "Lago delle Buse: come arrivare e che escursioni fare" [Lago delle Buse: how to get there and what excursions to do]. volpidelvajolet.it (in Italian).
