= Ettore Boschi =

Ettore Simone Boschi (Moneglia, 23 November 1874 – Milan, 18 May 1955) was an Italian soldier and writer.

== Biography ==
His birth in Moneglia was random and due to his father's work, the parents were in fact resident in Langhirano. A few years later he moved to Monza where he attended elementary schools. At age 25 he married Stella Villa, from whom he had three children: Bice, Lorenzo (Renzo) and Luigi Cesare (Gino). He was active in politics, he was a member of the Socialist Party and was director of the socialist magazine "La Brianza".

He was also twice elected municipal councilor. His passion for the mountaineering led him to become part of the alpine battalion "Autonomo Garibaldi" made up of experienced rock climbers and skiers. After embracing the intervening cause he volunteered for the First World War during which he was decorated with two silver medals and a bronze medal for war merits. His passion for mountaineering and his interest in the working class led him to found the UOEI in 1911 with the aim of giving workers and their families the chance to embrace the hiking that was reserved until now, at the same time hoping in this way to divert these people from the bettola. After the war came to fascism, he became editor of the newspaper "Il Popolo di Monza" in 1919, later he was secretary of the PNF in Monza and deputy secretary at the end of the regime in Milan. He participated in the war in East Africa and in the Spanish War where he had the rank of "Centurion", was released in 1944 with the rank of "Lieutenant colonel of the Alpine". In addition to his political and military commitment, Boschi is remembered for the dazzling publication of little novels dedicated to children, signed with the pseudo-nickname of "Nonno Ebe" and published between 1926 and the late 1930s for the publishing house "Il Cartoccino" directed by the children of Lorenzo and Luigi and famous throughout Italy for the folding cardboard toys he produced.

In his stories, Boschi draws inspiration from classical fairy tales and from the world of fairies and goblins, and it combines elements of his socialist formation and his passion for mountaineering. In addition to this, he continued to fight his anti-alcohol campaign by painting the vices of man as the bad ones from which to stay away. His most famous novel is "Cartoccino volontario di guerra", in which his military experience on Adamam glaciers is talked about. Another story to mention is "I Figli di Fata Campagnola" in which Boschi explicitly mentioned the Unione Operai Escursionisti Italiani telling the adventures of two small brothers traveling to Italy who are always ready to help each other.

Ettore Boschi died in Milan on 18 May 1955 at the age of almost 81 years.
