= Cima di Cece =

Mountain in Italy

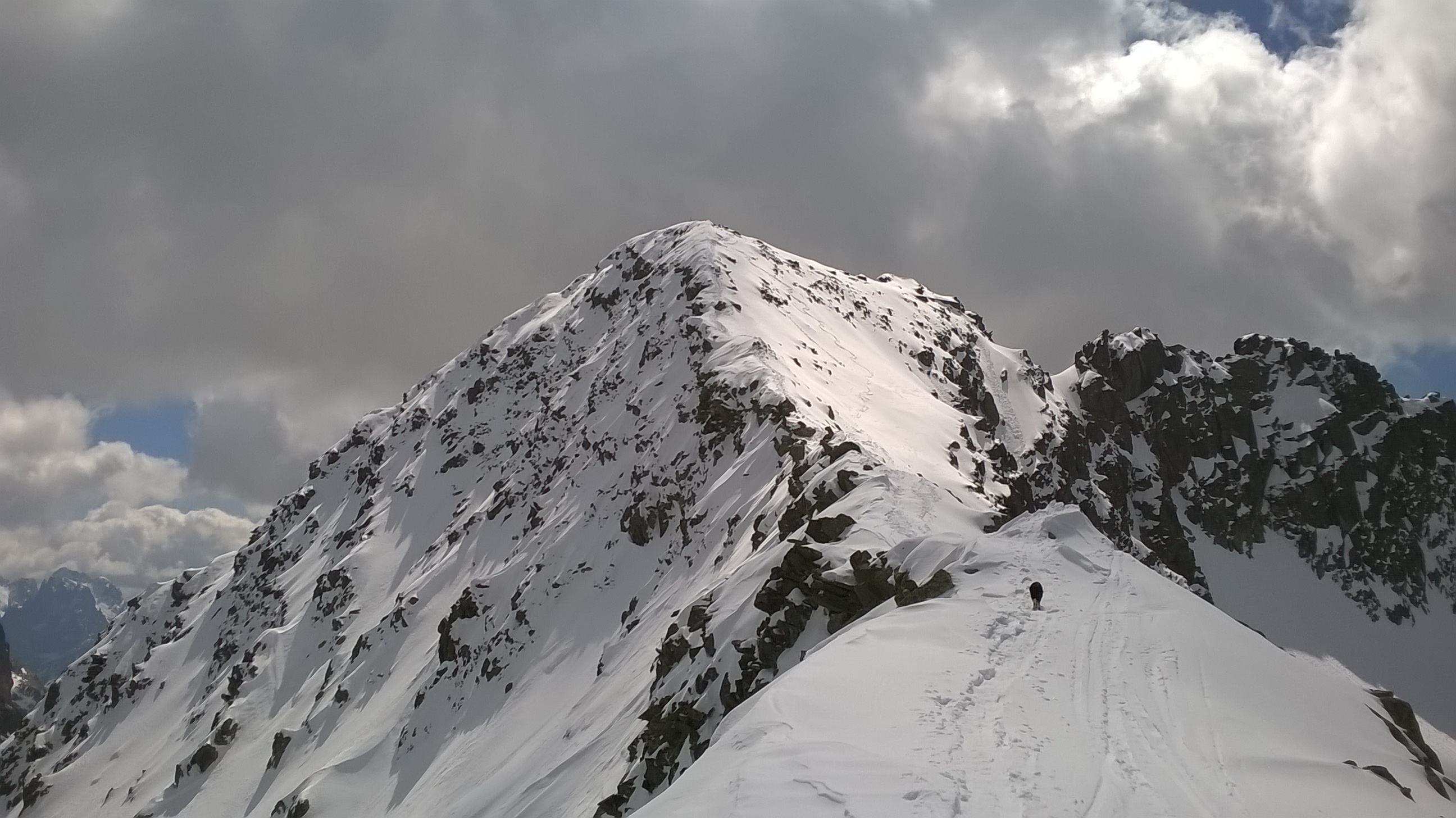
- Cima di Cece summit

Highest point
- Elevation: 2,754 m (9,035 ft)
- Prominence: 736 m (2,415 ft)
- Coordinates: 46°15′40″N 11°41′02″E

Geography
- Location within Alps
- Location: Trentino, Italy
- Parent range: Fiemme Mountains

Cima di Cece (2,754 m) is a peak in the Fiemme Mountains in Trentino, Italy. It is the highest peak of the Lagorai range, and lies south of the village of Predazzo. It is usually climbed from its northern side, from the Malga Di Valmaggiore mountain barn at 1,620 m, where a simple hike is required to reach the summit.
