= Cavallazza =

Mountain in Italy

Highest point
- Elevation: 2,324 m (7,625 ft)

Geography
- Location: Trentino, Italy
- Parent range: Lagorai

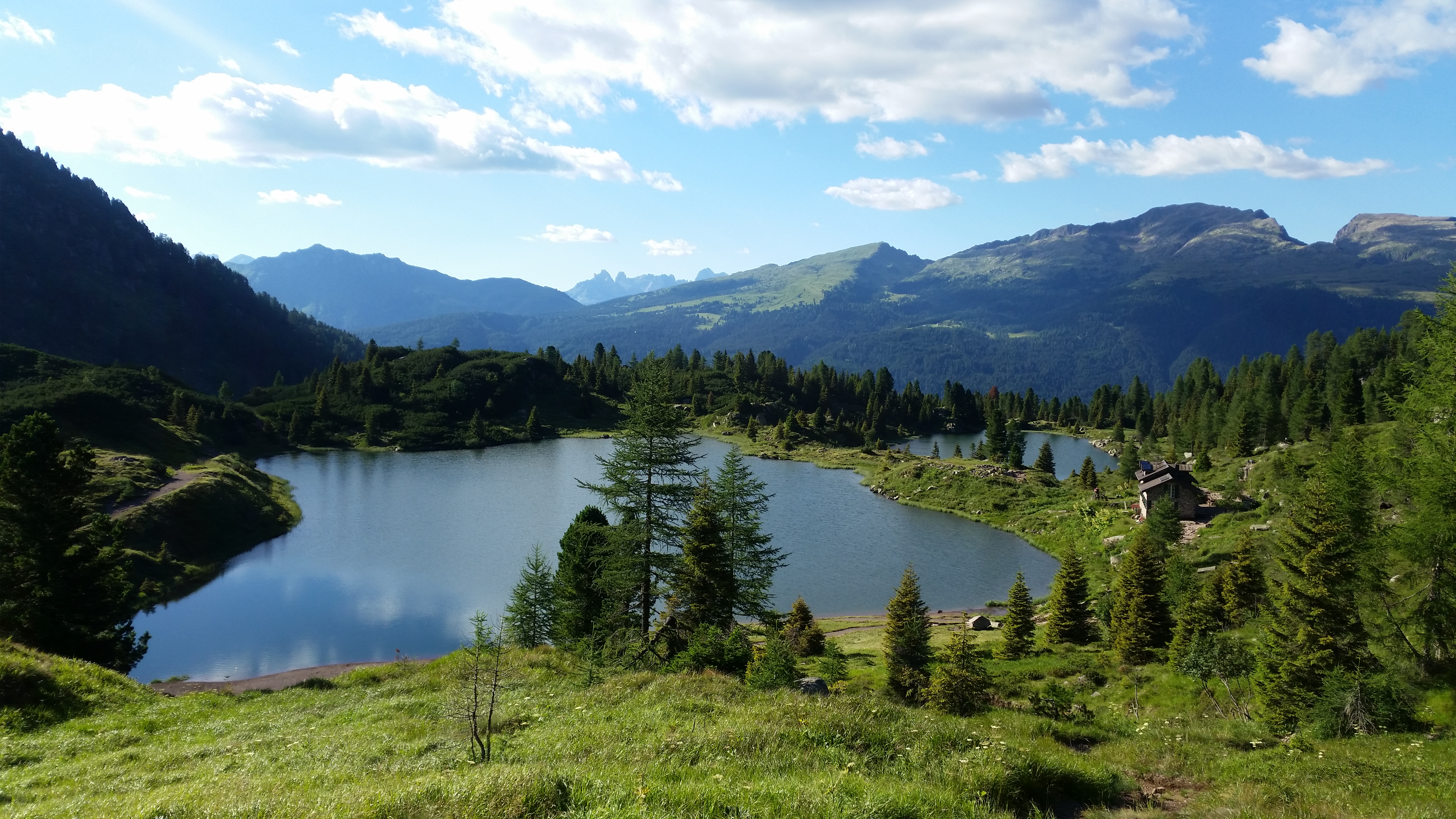

The Cavallazza is a mountain of Trentino, Italy, with an elevation of 2,324 metres (7,625 ft). Part of the Lagorai range, it lies within the borders of the Paneveggio-Pale di San Martino Natural Park.

During the First World War the mountain was on the frontline between Italy and Austria-Hungary; initially held by the Austro-Hungarians, it was seized by the Italians on 21 July 1916. Trenches and tunnels dug by the Alpini can be seen to this day.

The peak can be reached on foot from Passo Rolle or from San Martino di Castrozza.
