= Nepomuceno Bolognini =

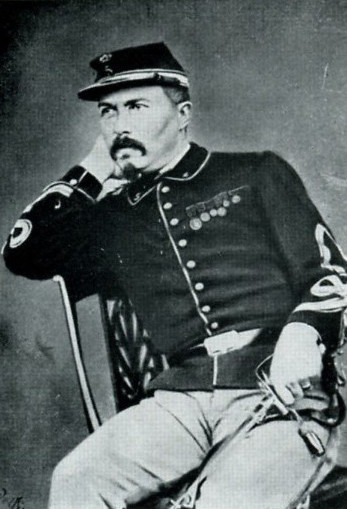

Nepomuceno Bolognini (born 24 March 1824 in Pinzolo; died 19 July 1900 in Milan) was an officer of Garibaldi, ethnographer of the 18th century and founder of the Società degli Alpinisti Tridentini in 1872, the largest association of mountaineers part of the Italian Alpine Club.

A street in Pinzolo has been named after him.
