= Lastè delle Sute =

Mountain in Italy

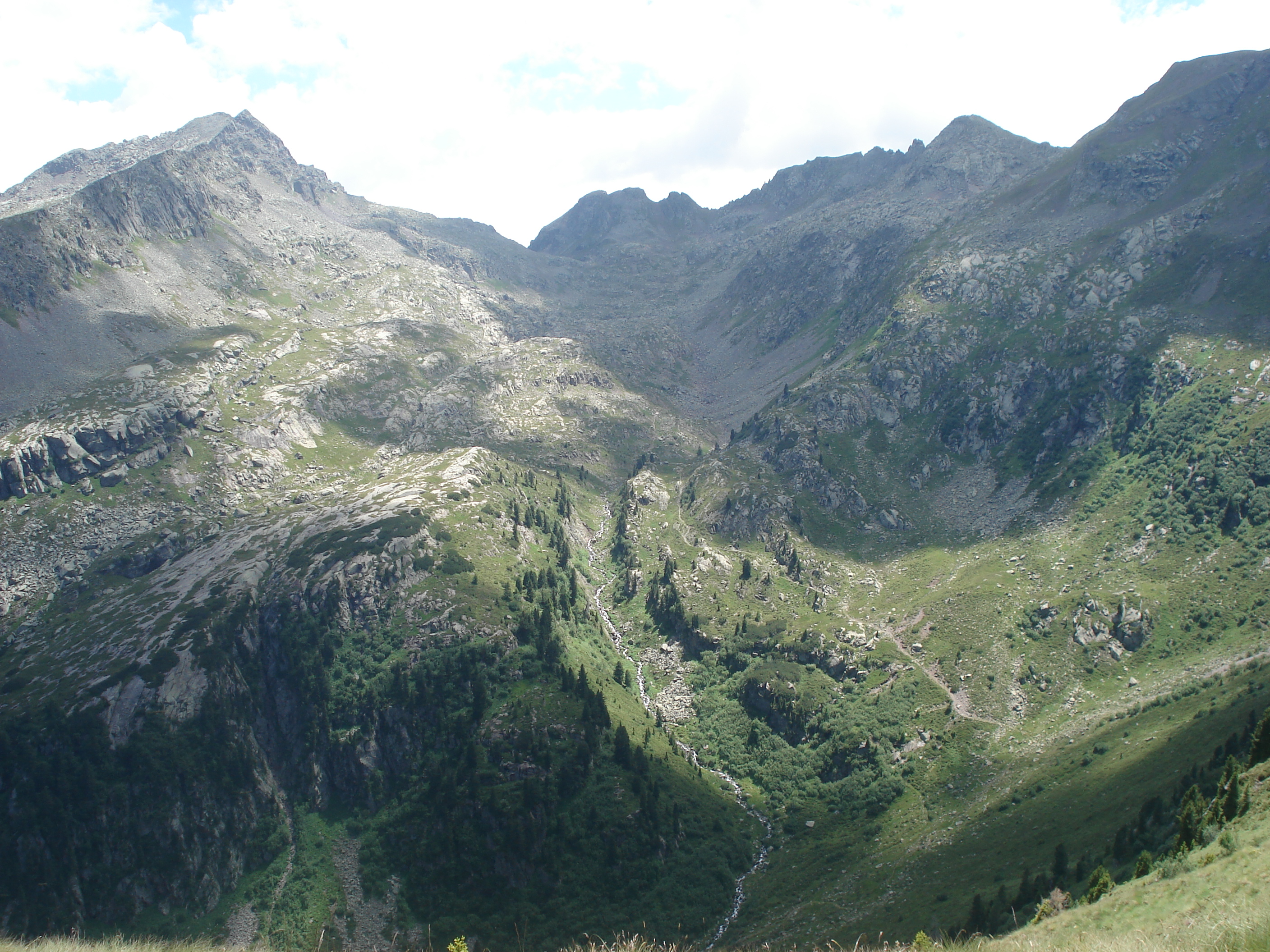

Highest point
- Elevation: 2,616 m (8,583 ft)

Geography
- Location: Trentino, Italy
- Parent range: Lagorai

The Lastè delle Sute, also known as Cimon delle Sute, is a mountain in Trentino, Italy, with an elevation of 2,616 metres (8,583 ft). It is located in the Province of Trento, between the Brenta and Adige drainage basins, and is the highest peak of central Lagorai.

It has three sides: the relatively gentle northern side and the more rugged southern and eastern sides. It lies between the territories of Tesero and Pieve Tesino. Remains of World War I trenches can be found on the peak.
