= Manghen Pass =

Italian mountain pass

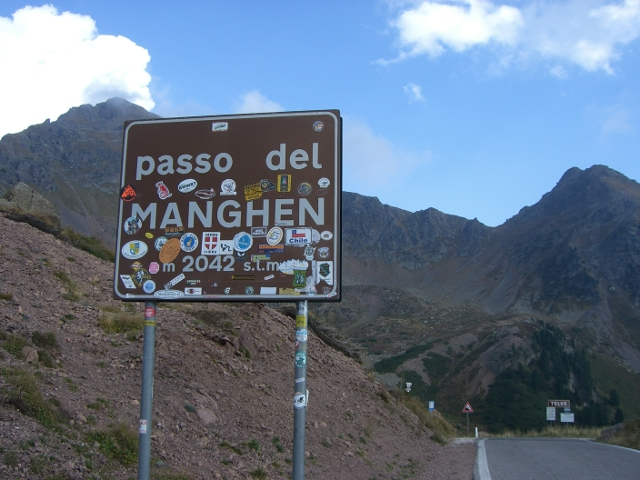
- Interactive map of Manghen Pass
- Elevation: 2,047 metres (6,716 ft)

Third Approach
- Location: Trentino, Italy
- Coordinates: 46°10′31″N 11°26′21″E

The Manghen Pass (Italian: Passo Manghen) is a 2,047-metre-high (6,716 ft) mountain pass in Trentino in Italy.

It connects the Fiemme valley and Valsugana, linking Molina and Castelnuovo in the south. The pass road has a maximum grade of 16%. Commercial traffic is prohibited.

The massive road climb from Val Sugana was featured in the 2008 and 2019 Giro d'Italia cycle race.

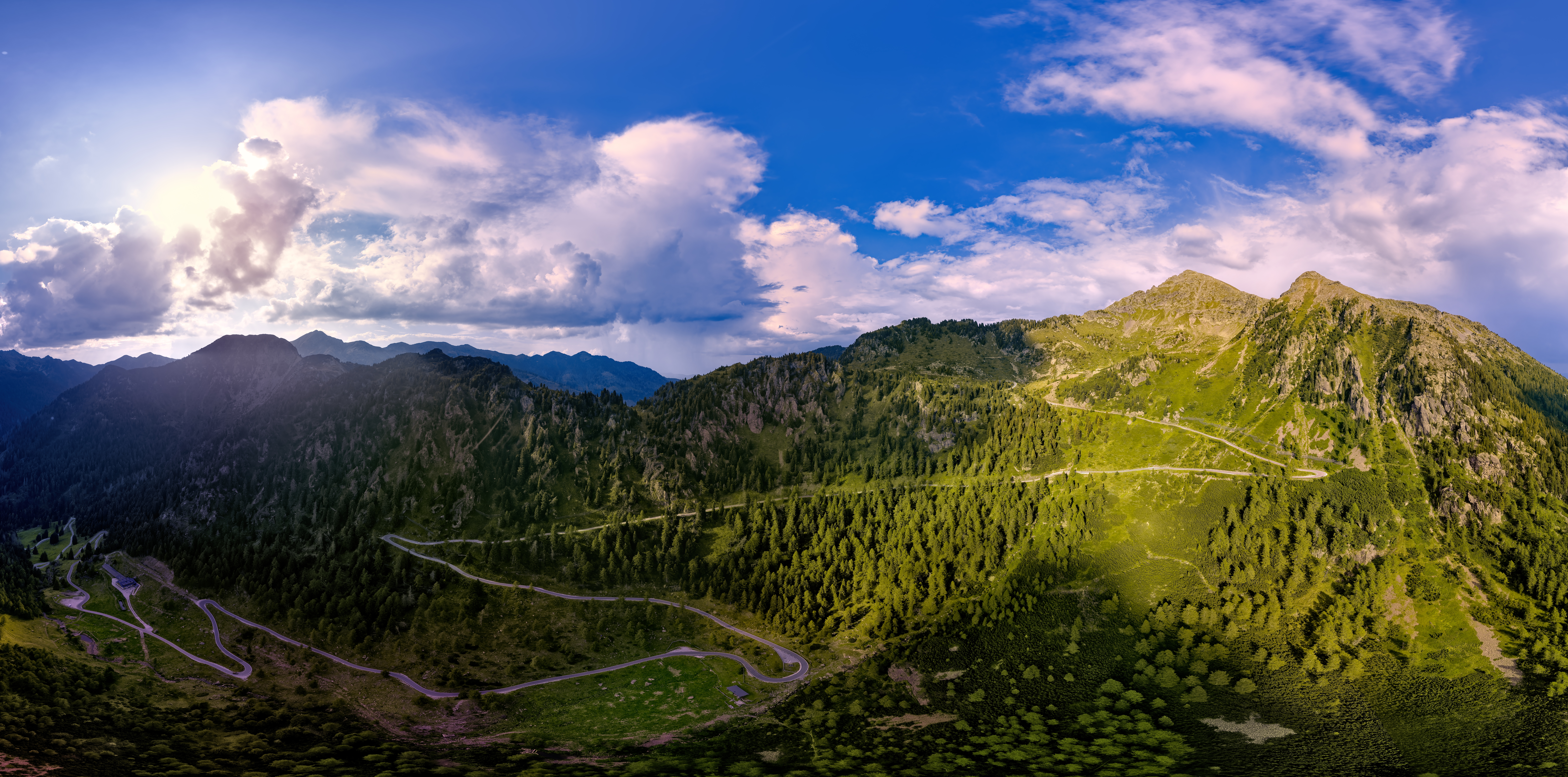
Panoramic picture of the Manghenpass south side, taken from near the saddle.

== See also ==
- List of highest paved roads in Europe
- List of mountain passes
- Lake delle Buse
