= Cima Litegosa =

Mountain in Italy

Coordinates: 46°13′31″N 11°33′32″E

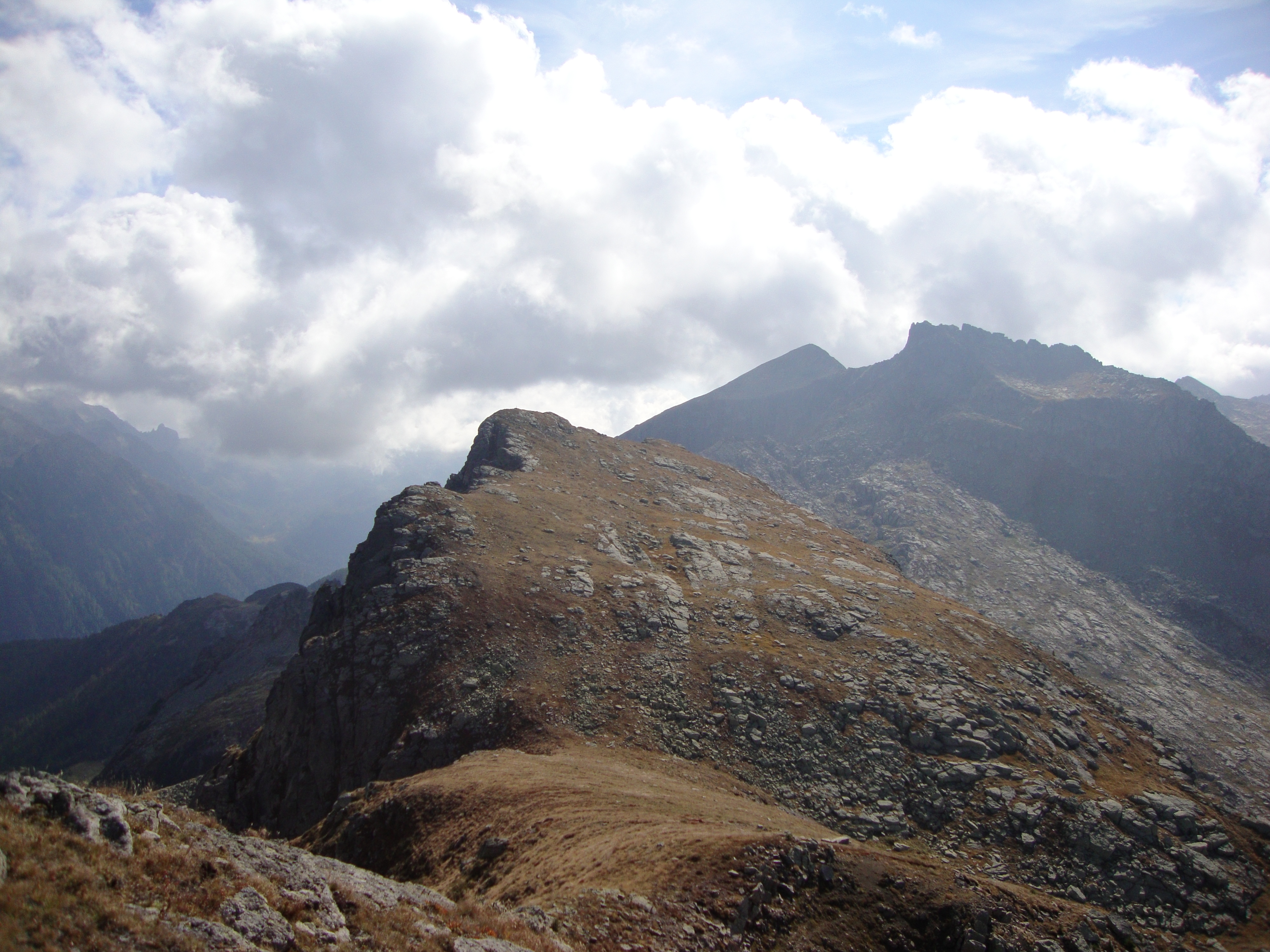
- Cima Litegosa in the background, with Formenton in the foreground

Highest point
- Elevation: 2,548 m (8,360 ft)

Geography
- Location: Trentino, Italy
- Parent range: Lagorai

Cima Litegosa is a mountain of Trentino, Italy, with an elevation of 2,548 metres (8,360 ft). It is located in the eastern part of the Province of Trento, between the Val di Fiemme and the Vanoi valley.

The peak can be reached from Malga Toacio (near Ziano di Fiemme) on a mule track built by Austro-Hungarian troops during World War I, or through hiking paths from Passo Sadole and Cima Copolà. The final ascent to the peak is made through steps carved in the rock during the First World War; trenches and tunnels still exits on the peak.
