= Cima delle Stellune =

Mountain in Italy

Coordinates: 46°11′58″N 11°30′39″E

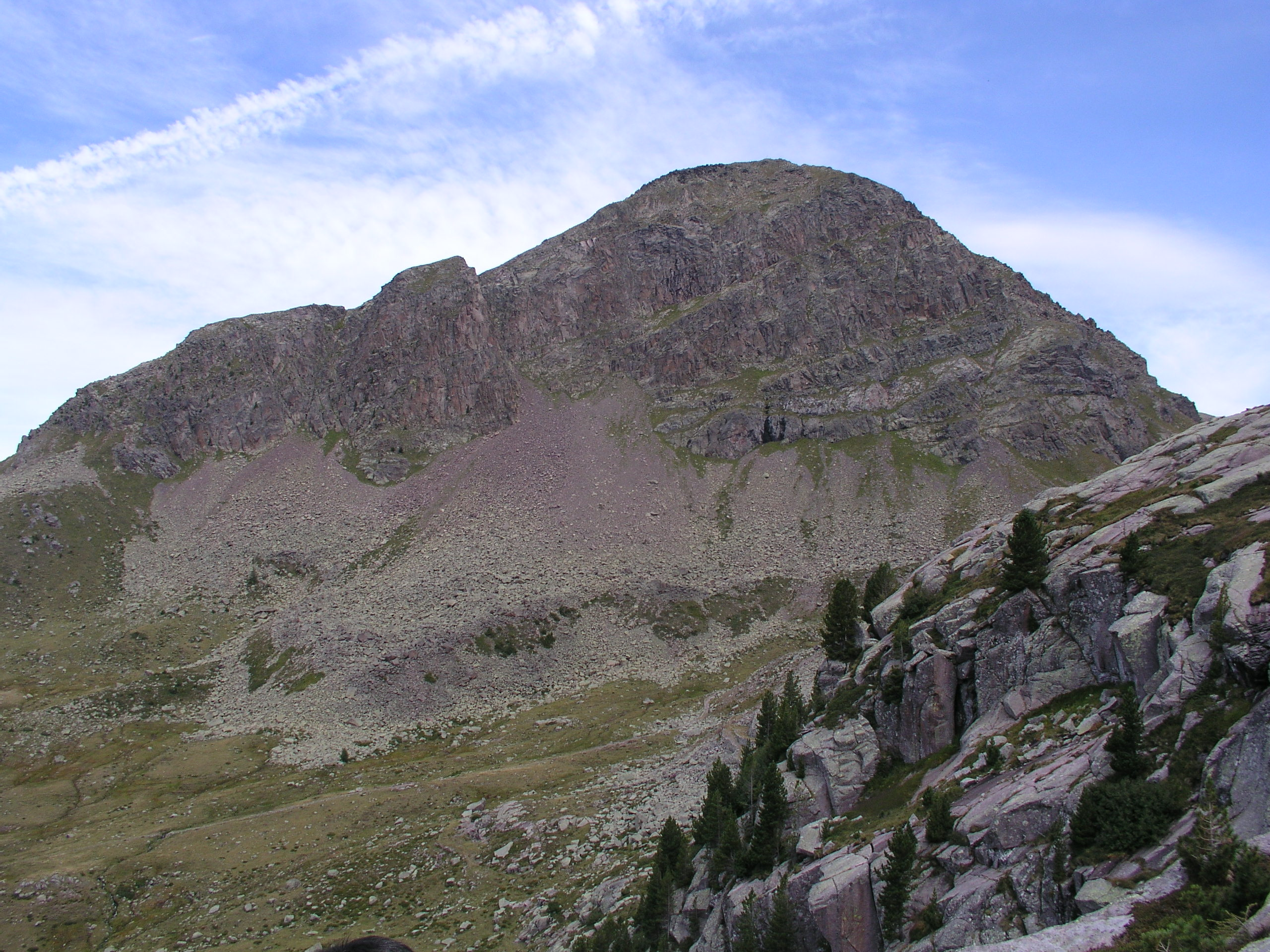

Highest point
- Elevation: 2,605 m (8,547 ft)

Geography
- Location: Trentino, Italy
- Parent range: Lagorai

Cima delle Stellune is a mountain of Trentino, Italy, with an elevation of 2,605 metres (8,547 ft). It is located in the Province of Trento, between the Brenta and Adige drainage basins (to the south-east and north-west, respectively).

The peak is a renowned panoramic point as well as a tripoint between the municipalities of Cavalese (to the north), Castello-Molina di Fiemme (to the west), and Pieve Tesino (to the east and south-east).

The small Busa snow field is located on the northern side of the Cima delle Stellune (Val Moena), the Stellune lake is located on the western side (Val delle Stue) and the small Buse Basse lakes are on the southern side (Val Sorda).

Remnants of World War I trenches can be found on the mountain.
