= Villa Agnedo =

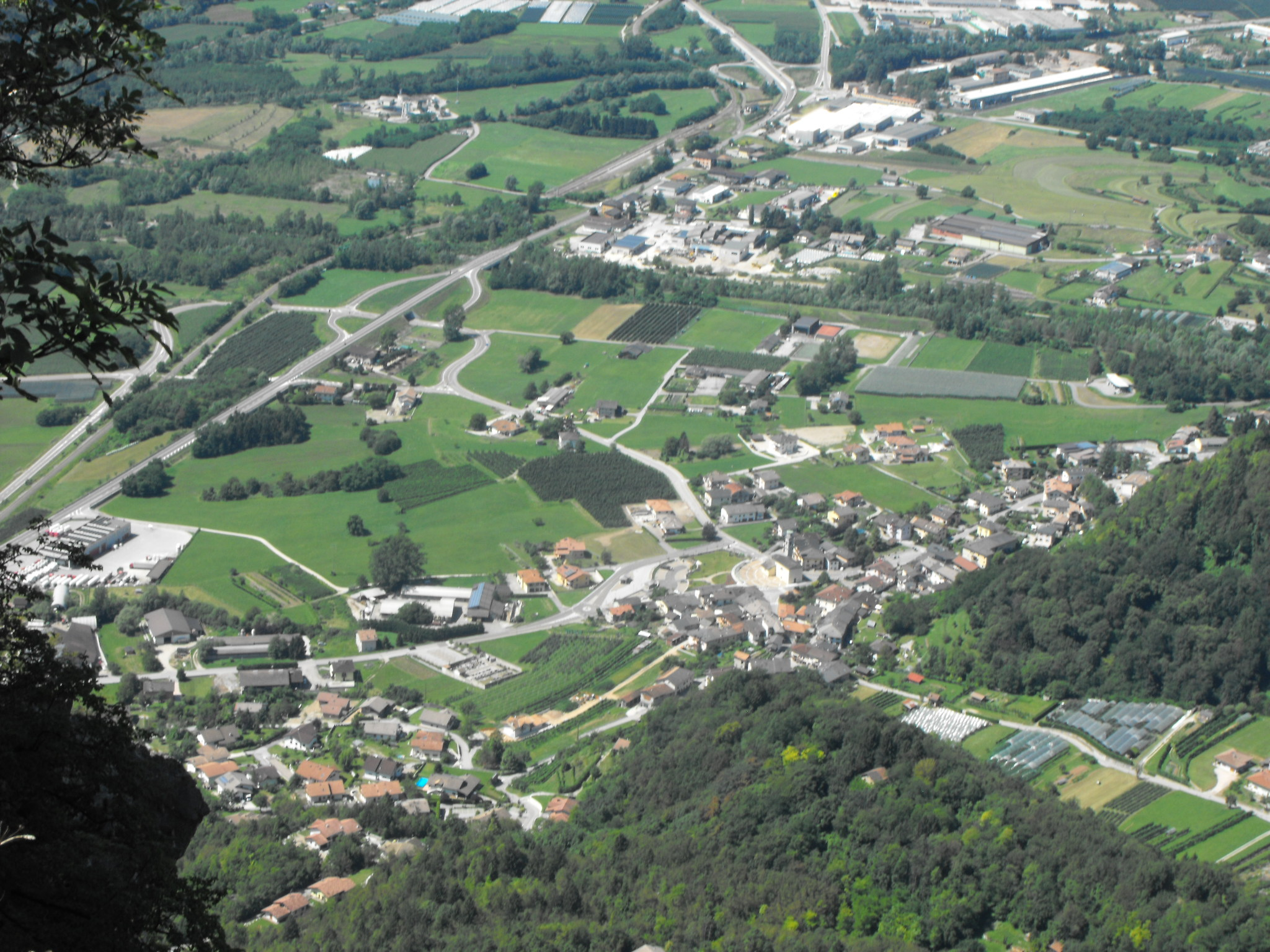
Aerial view.

Villa Agnedo is a frazione of the comune (municipality) of Castel Ivano, Trentino. It was an independent commune until 1 January 2016, when it merged with the comunes of Spera and Strigno to create the municipality of Castel Ivano. It had a population of 955 in 2015.
