= Lagorai =

Mountain in Italy

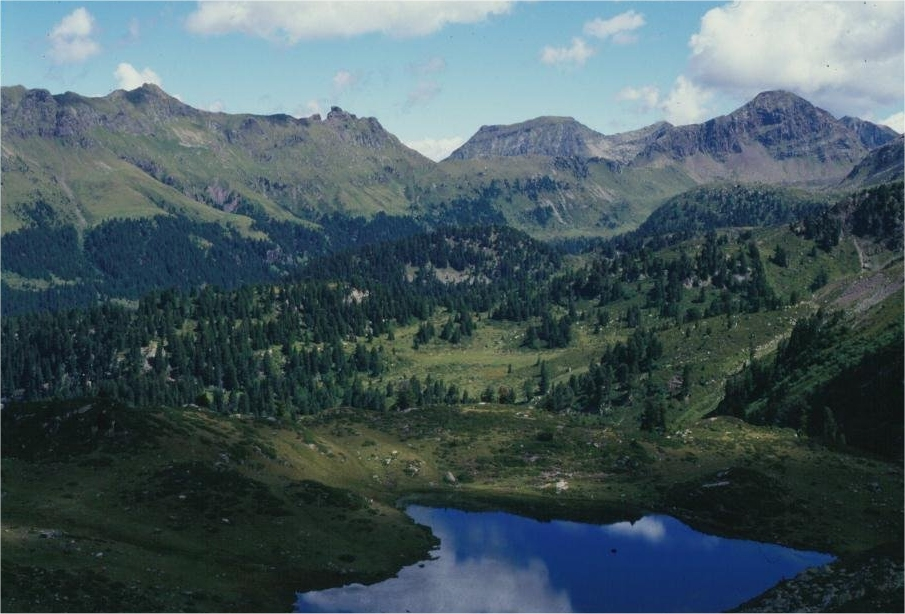

Highest point
- Peak: Cima di Cece
- Elevation: 2,754 m (9,035 ft)
- Coordinates: 46°10′01″N 11°36′00″E

Geography
- Country: Italy
- Parent range: Eastern Alps

The Lagorai is a mountain range in the Eastern Alps, in Trentino, northern Italy.

It is located between the Monte Panarotta (16 km) from Trento and Rolle Pass, for a length of some 70 km. It is bounded southwards by the Valsugana, by the Val di Fiemme from the north, the Val di Cembra from the west and the Primiero and Vanoi eastwards.

The chain is mostly made of porphyry rocks. It was the site of fierce mine warfare on the Italian Front in the First World War.

The north-eastern part in the massif is part of the Paneveggio-Pale di San Martino Natural Park. Near the Rolle Pass, at 2,000 m altitude, are the small lakes of Colbricon, home of pre-historic settlements dating to the Neolithic age.

== Highest peaks ==
- Cima di Cece, 2,754 m
- Coston dei Slavaci, 2,708 m
- Cime di Ceremana, 2,699 m
- Cime di Bragarolo, 2,692 m
- Cima Valon, 2,678 m
- Lastè delle Sute, 2,616 m
- Colbricon, 2,602 m
- Cima delle Stellune, 2,597 m
- Cima di Lagorai, 2,585 m
- Cima Valbona, 2,556 m
- Cima Litegosa, 2,548 m
- Cima di Cupola, 2,547 m
- Cimon di Lasteolo, 2,544 m
- Castel di Bombasel, 2,532 m
- Colrotondo, 2,532 m
- Cima Moregna, 2,516 m
- Busa Alta, 2,513 m
- Piccolo Colbricon, 2,511 m
- Monte Cauriol, 2,494 m
- Cimon di Val Moena, 2,481 m
- Cardinal, 2,481 m
- Monte Ziolera, 2,478 m
- Cima di Valmaggiore, 2,476 m
- Castel delle Aie, 2,475 m
- Canzenagol, 2,457 m
- Montalon, 2,435 m
- Pala del Becco, 2,421 m
- Monte Formentone, 2,414 m
- Cima di Valbona, 2,413 m
- Cimon del To della Trappola, 2,400 m
- Cavallazza, 2,324 m

== See also ==
- Mount Lefre
- Lake delle Buse
