= Società degli Alpinisti Tridentini =

Climbing association in the Italian alpine province of Trento

Society of Tridentin mountaineers
- Società degli Alpinisti Tridentini
- Abbreviation: SAT
- Formation: 2 September 1872
- Founder: Nepomuceno Bolognini
- Headquarters: Trento, Italy
- Website: http://www.sat.tn.it/

The Società degli Alpinisti Tridentini (SAT) is an alpine club operating in the Italian alpine province of Trento. It is the largest branch of the Italian Alpine Club.

== History ==
SAT was founded in Madonna di Campiglio on 2 September 1872 under the name of Alpine Society of Trentino. The founding members intended to promote knowledge of the Trentino mountains, tourist development of the valleys, and the Italianness of Trentino. To pursue these goals, they constructed huts, created paths, financed hoteliers, organized mountain guides, climbed peaks, and published geographic and mountaineering writings.

SAT's first president was Prospero Marchetti (1822–1884); its first vice president was Nepomuceno Bolognini (1823–1900). Members were summoned twice a year to spring and summer meetings known as the congresses, during which mountaineering, geographic, naturalistic and historical reports were presented and the association's progress was measured. The first congress took place in Madonna di Campiglio in 1872; in 1994 its hundredth congress was celebrated in Trento.

The SAT was not a group of mountaineers and hikers, but of a group of bourgeois irredentists who wanted to implement "cultural appropriation and the acquisition of material possession of the homeland". In fact, in 1874 the society was dissolved by the Austrian authorities for pro-Italian activities. Then, in 1877, it was renamed to Società degli Alpinisti Tridentini ('Tridentini mountaineering company', SAT).

The nationalist character of the SAT led to the so-called refuge war, a clash that expressed itself in the toponomy of the mountain, between the flags secretly hidden on the peaks, and the constructions of "double" shelters built alongside each other. For example, during the inauguration of the Quintino Sella hut in 1906, the participants could observe the yard of the German competitor Rifugio Tuckett. But shortly afterwards, World War I broke out and the SAT was dissolved again. Many of its militants were interned or forced into confinement, while others took refuge in Italy.

In 1920 SAT became a section of the Italian Alpine Club (CAI), maintaining autonomy. On 7 January 1921 the workers' subsection of SOSAT, a mountaineering workers' group was formed on the initiative of Nino Peterlongo, who had founded a section of the Unione Operai Escursionisti Italiani ('Union of Italian Hikers) in 1919 in Trento.

In 2012 SAT had over 27,000 members, divided into 82 sections and 10 groups. It has 34 shelters, 12 bivouacs and various support points and social huts, cares for the signage and maintenance of over 6,000 km of trails; Its alpine relief, founded in 1952, has 800 volunteers divided into 37 stations spread across the provincial territory with a cyanophilic and speleological unit.

The headquarters of the association is located in Trento in the palace Saracini-Cresseri (16th century), which houses the SAT museum, the historical archive, the SAT mountain library, the SAT section of Trento, the SUSAT (University Section), the SAT Chorus, the Provincial College of the Alpine Guides, the SAT Rock Cluster and the Giorgio Graffer Mountaineering and Mountaineering School.

SAT operates voluntarily in the Dolomites and the mountains of Trentino.
