= Fiemme Mountains =

Mountain range in Italy

- Fleimstal Alps
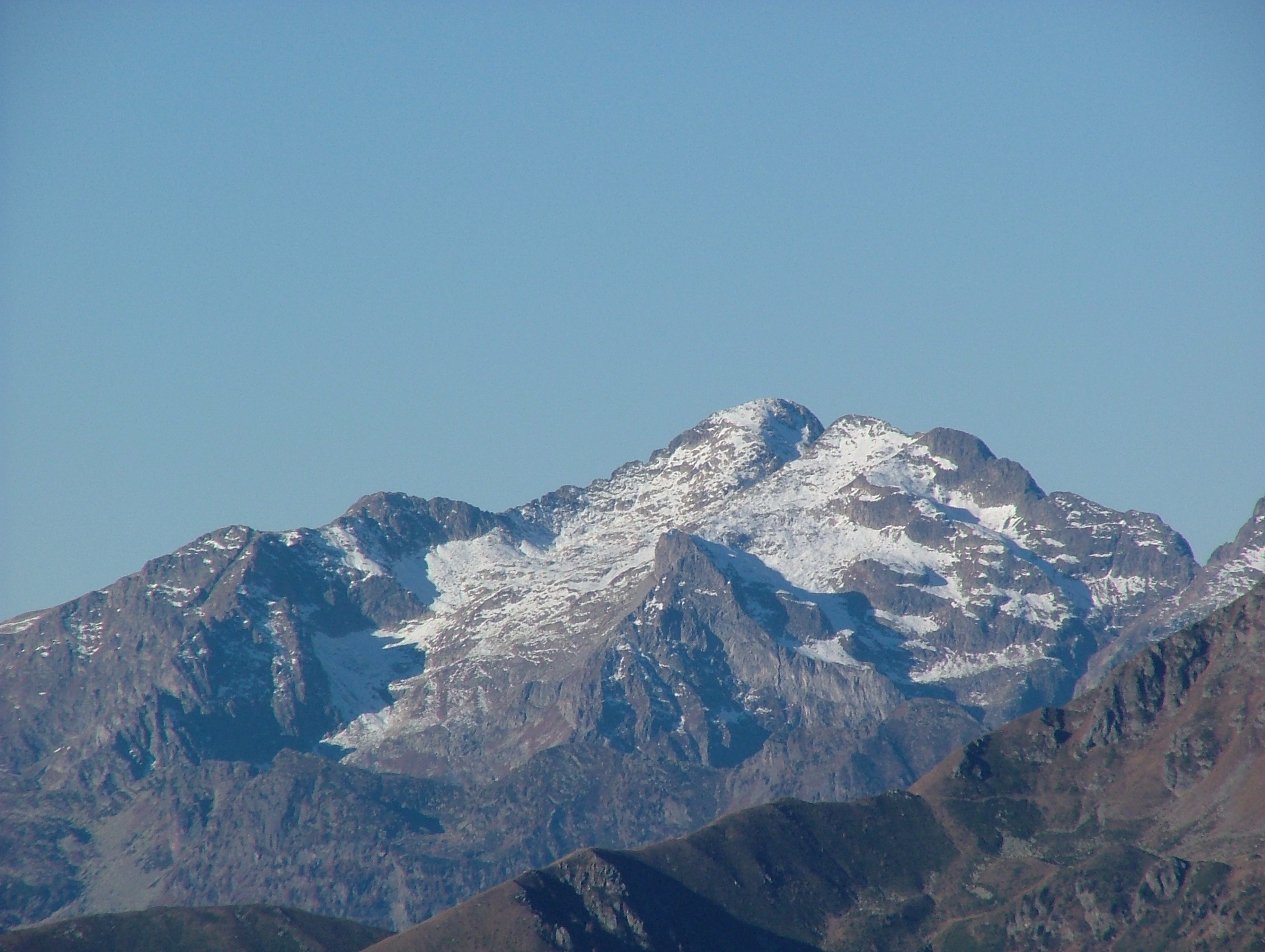
- The Cima d'Asta, the highest peak of the range.

Highest point
- Peak: Cima d'Asta
- Elevation: 2,847 m s.l.m.
- Coordinates: 46°10′37″N 11°36′17″E

Geography
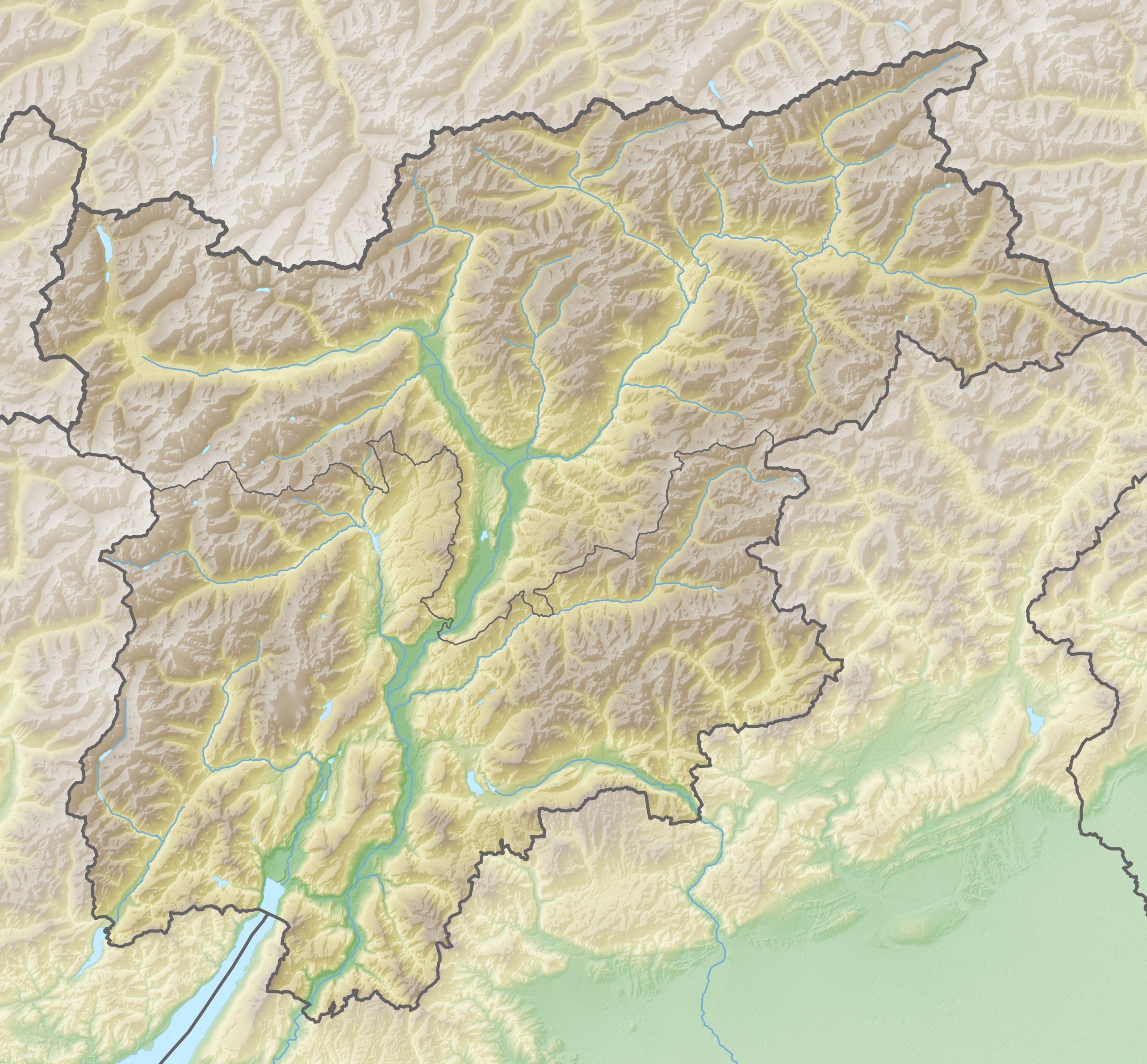
- Location within Trentino-Alto Adige/Südtirol
- Country: Italy
- Region: Trentino-South Tyrol
- Range coordinates: 46°09′00″N 11°35′45″E
- Parent range: Southern Limestone Alps

The Fiemme Mountains, sometimes also the Fleimstal Alps (German: Fleimstaler Alpen) or Fiemme Dolomites (Italian: Dolomiti di Fiemme), are a mountain range of the Southern Limestone Alps in the Italian region of Trentino-South Tyrol. The range was named after the Fiemme Valley (Italian: Val di Fiemme; German: Fleimstal).

It is located between the Sarntal Alps, the Dolomites, the Vicentine Alps, the Garda Mountains, the Brenta and the Nonsberg Group. In the Alpine Club classification of the Eastern Alps (AVE) of 1984, the Fiemme Mountains are bounded as follows: the northern end is formed by the town of Bolzano from where the boundary continues southeast along the Eggental valley, over the Zanggenjoch and Satteljoch passes to Predazzo. Next it runs through Paneveggio and over the Rolle Pass into the Cismon Valley as far as Mezzano. It then crosses the Góbbera and Brocon Passes to Pieve Tesino and Strigno into the Sugana Valley. Finally it runs along the Mocheni Valley to Trento, from where follows the Etschtal valley once again to Bolzano.

In the South Tyrolean part of the Fiemme Mountains is the Trudner Horn Nature Park.
