= Spera =

Frazione of Castel Ivano, Trentino, Italy

Spera is a frazione of the comune (municipality) of Castel Ivano, Trentino, in the northern Italian region Trentino-Alto Adige/Südtirol, located about 30 kilometres (19 mi) east of Trento. It had a population of 583 in 2015. It was an independent commune until 1 January 2016.
