= Panarotta =

Mountain in Italy

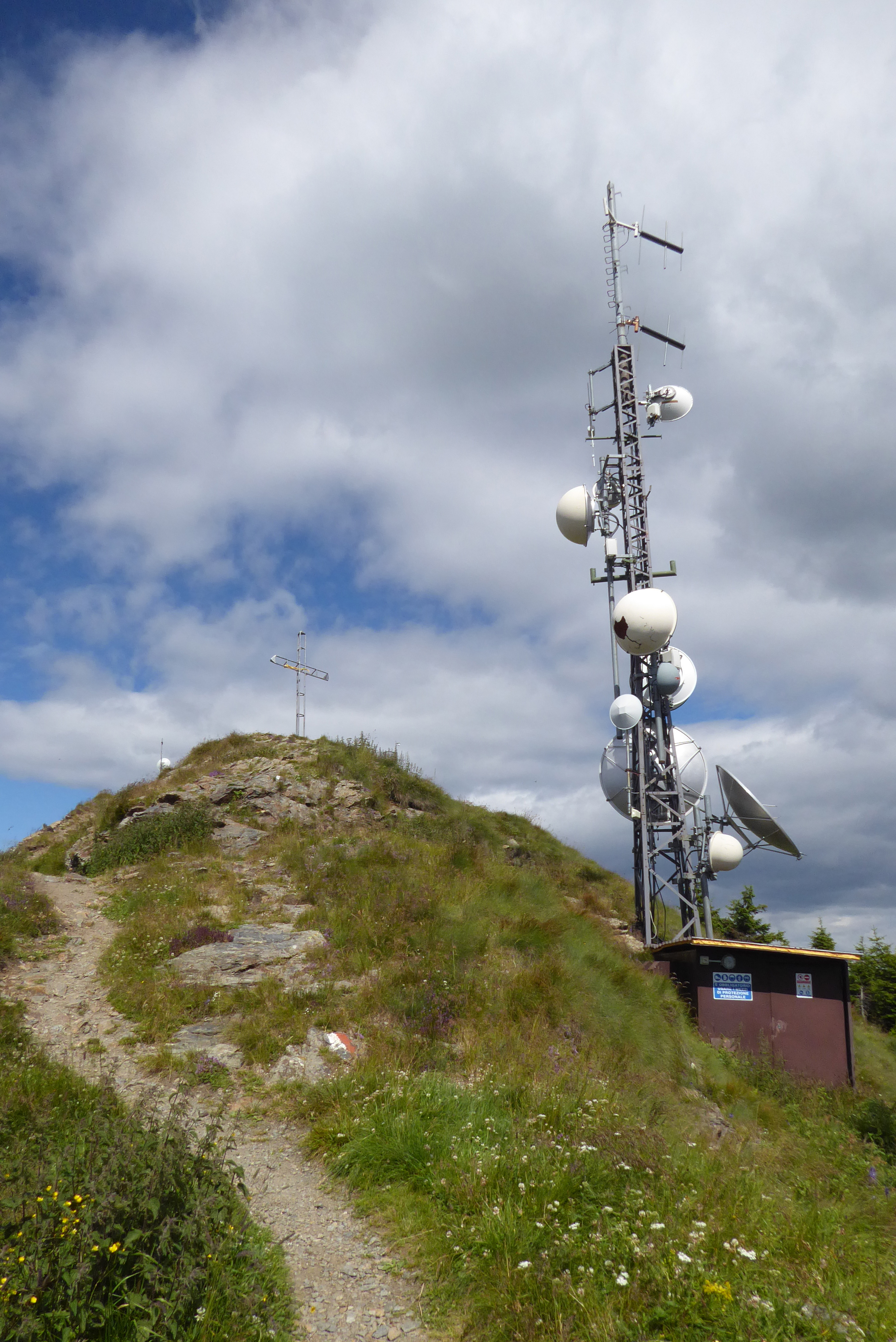
- The peak of the Panarotta

Highest point
- Elevation: 2,002 m (6,568 ft)

Geography
- Location: Trentino, Italy
- Parent range: Lagorai

The Panarotta, or Monte Panarotta, is a mountain of Trentino, Italy, with an elevation of 2,002 metres (6,568 ft). It is the southernmost two-thousander in the Lagorai, in the Province of Trento.

The La Bassa Pass (1,829 m) divides the Panarotta from nearby Monte Fravort. Four skilifts, eighteen kilometres of ski slopes and a mountain hut are located on its southern side.

Located close to the prewar border between Italy and Austria-Hungary, the Panarotta was contested during the First World War, and relics of the war can still be seen on the mountain.
