= Cima d'Asta =

Mountain in Trentino, Italy

Cima d’Asta
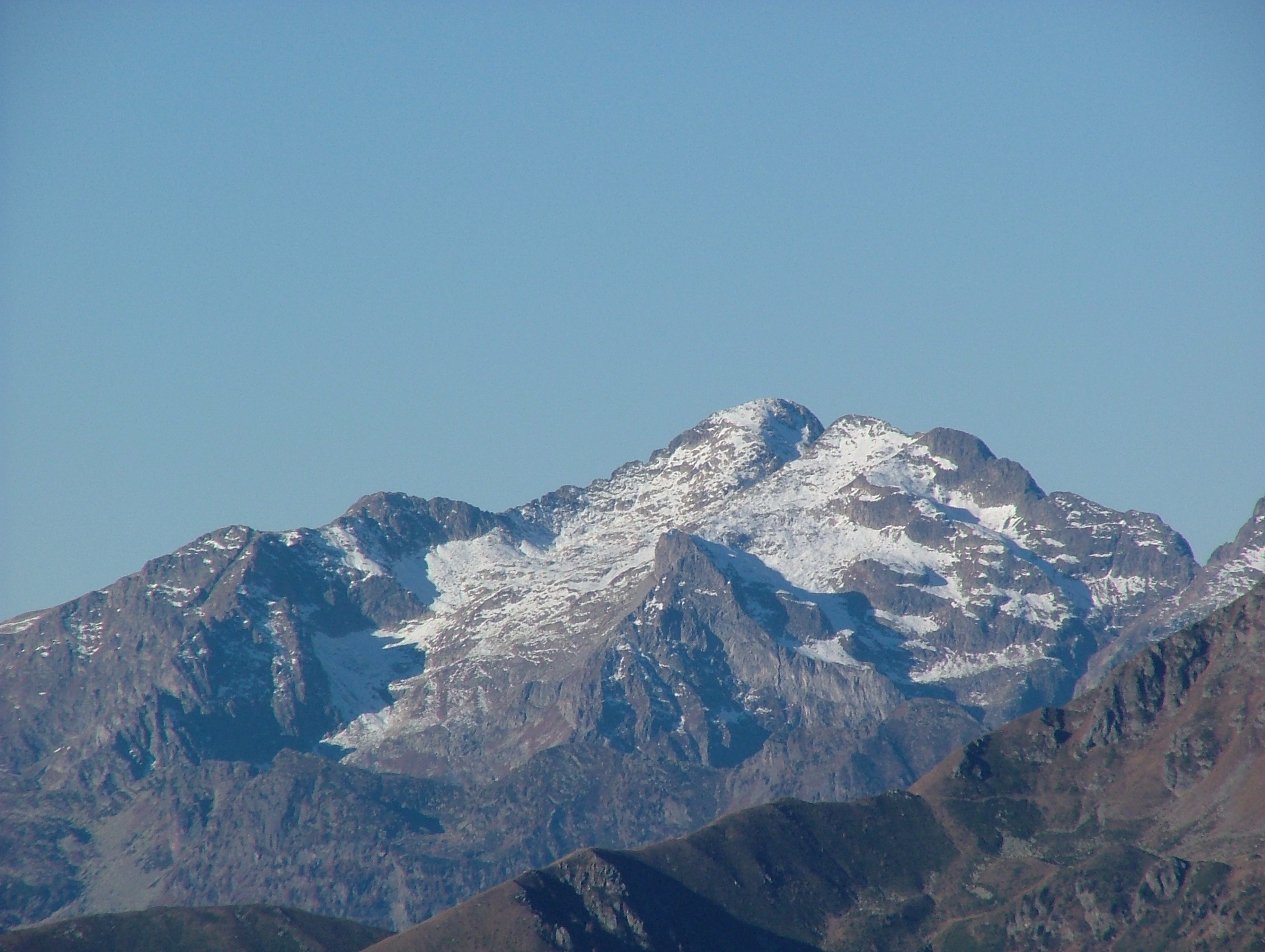
- Cima d’Asta as seen from the Pala group in the north-east.

Highest point
- Elevation: 2,847 m (9,341 ft)
- Prominence: 939 m (3,081 ft)
- Parent peak: Vezzana
- Listing: Alpine mountains 2500-2999 m
- Coordinates: 46°10′37″N 11°36′17″E

Geography
- Location within Alps
- Location: Pieve Tesino, Trentino, Italy
- Parent range: Fiemme Alps

Climbing
- First ascent: 1816 by surveyors or earlier. First reported ascent by Gustav Euringer in 1882.

Cima d’Asta at 2,847 metres (9,341 ft) is the highest mountain of the Fiemme Mountains in the eastern part of the Italian province of Trentino.

It is situated in Pieve Tesino, between the Vanoi valley to the north and the Tesino valley to the south and is 18 km north-east of the town of Borgo Valsugana. It is over 21 km away from the nearest higher summit, the Cimon della Pala. Just south of the summit is a mountain lake at 2460 m, the Lago di Cima d’Asta, from which the river Grigno originates.

It is unclear when the first ascent was made. On his ascent in 1882, Gustav Euringer did not find evidence of earlier visits, but was aware that the summit had been a triangulation point since 1816 and assumed it had been reached at or before that time.
