= Castel Ivano =

- Comune
- Comune di Castel Ivano
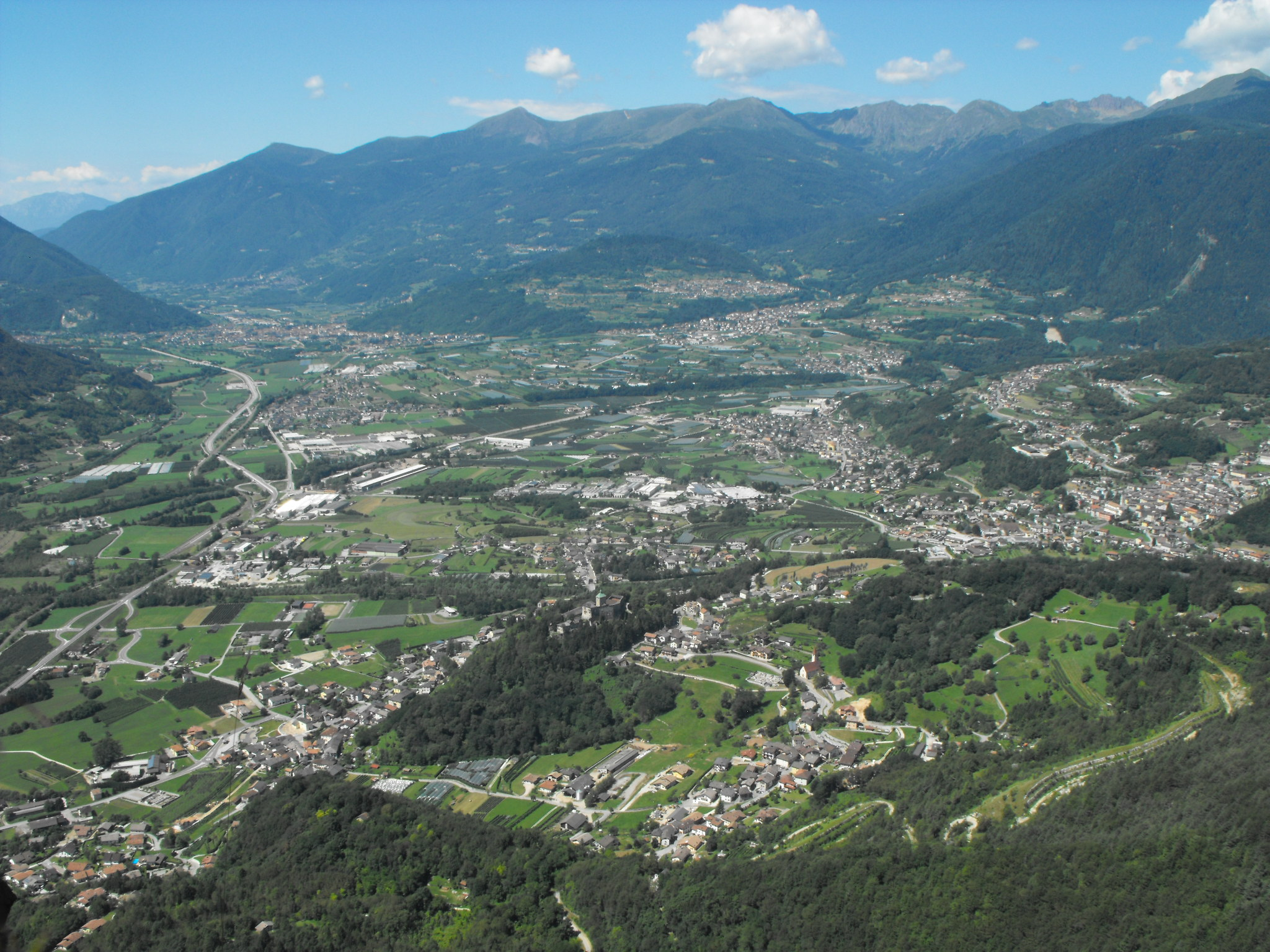

- Location within Italy Location within Trentino-Alto Adige/Südtirol
- Coordinates: 46°3′59″N 11°31′25″E
- Country: Italy
- Region: Trentino-Alto Adige/Südtirol
- Province: Trentino (TN)
- Frazioni: Agnedo, Barricata, Ivano-Fracena, Latini, Lupi, Oltrebrenta, Pellegrini, Prati dei Floriani, Spera, Strigno (communal seat), Tomaselli, Torgheli, Villa

Government
  - Mayor: Alberto Vesco

Area
  - Total: 34.38 km^{2} (13.27 sq mi)
- Elevation: 506 m (1,660 ft)

Population (2026)
  - Total: 3,309
  - Density: 96.25/km^{2} (249.3/sq mi)
- Time zone: UTC+1 (CET)
  - Summer (DST): UTC+2 (CEST)
- Postal code: 38059
- Dialing code: 0461
- Website: Official website

Castel Ivano is a comune (municipality) in Trentino in the northern Italian region Trentino-Alto Adige/Südtirol. It was formed on 1 January 2016 as the merger of the previous communes of Strigno, Spera and Villa Agnedo. In July 2016 it also absorbed the commune of Ivano-Fracena.

It is located in Valsugana, midway between Borgo Valsugana and the boundary with Veneto.

Sights include the eponymous "Castel Ivano", a medieval fortress originally located in the frazione of Ivano-Fracena
