= Unione Operai Escursionisti Italiani =

Italian mountaineering association

The Unione Operai Escursionisti Italiani (Union of Italian Hikers) is an independent and non-partisan mountaineering association.

It was founded on 29 June 1911.
