= Ivano-Fracena =

- frazione
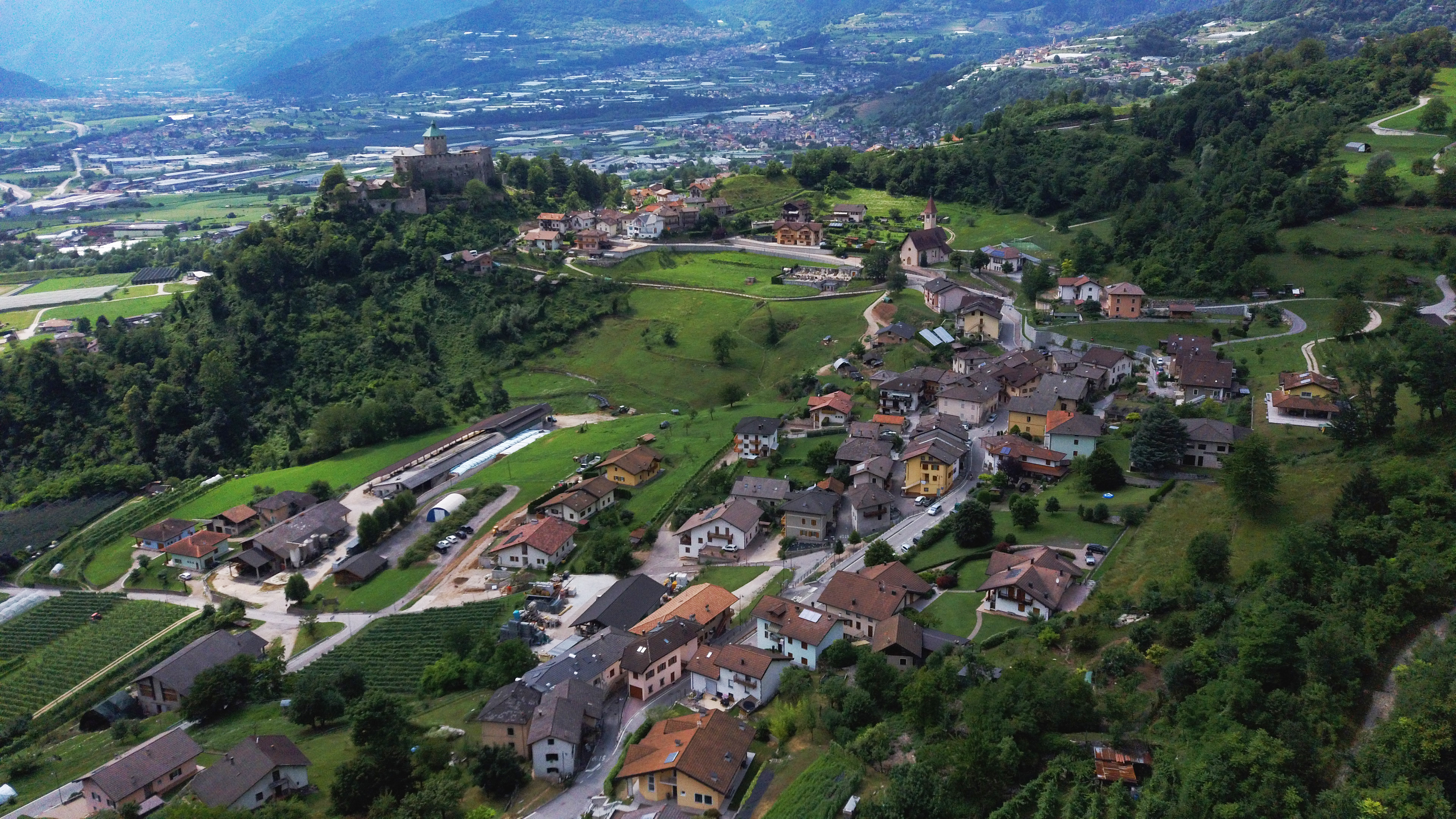

- Location within Italy
- Coordinates: 46°03′00″N 11°32′00″E

Ivano-Fracena (German: Yfän) is a frazione of the comune (municipality) of Castel Ivano, Trentino, in the northern Italian region Trentino-Alto Adige/Südtirol, located about 30 kilometres (19 mi) east of Trento. It was an independent comune until 1 July 2016.
