= Strigno =

Frazione of Castel Ivano, Trentino, Italy

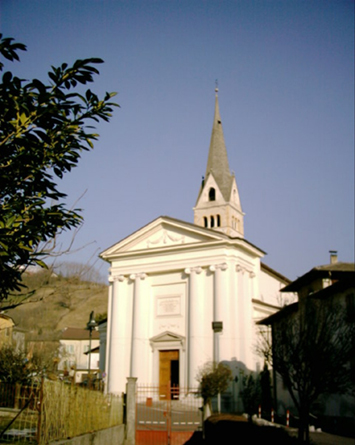
Church in Strigno

Strigno (German: Striegen) is a frazione of the comune (municipality) of Castel Ivano, Trentino, in the northern Italian region Trentino-Alto Adige/Südtirol, located about 30 kilometres (19 mi) east of Trento. It had a population of 1,424 in 2015. It was an independent commune until 1 January 2016.
