= Giorgio Festa =

Italian physician

Giorgio Festa (Rome 1860- Frascati 1940) was an Italian physician.

== Biography ==
Giorgio Festa is known for being Saint Pio of Pietrelcina's personal doctor. In 1919 he was assigned by the Minister of the Order of Friars Minor Capuchin to do a medical examination on Saint Pio of Pietrelcina. In 1920 Festa went to San Giovanni Rotondo for a medical check on some Saint Pio of Pietrelcina's injures he had observed the month before. On 5 October 1925 he operated Saint Pio of Pietrelcina on the right inguinal hernia and in 1927 he removed a cyst, which was on Saint Pio's sternocleidomastoid muscle. In 1938 he published his visits results in "Misteri di scienza e luci di fede. Stigmate del padre Pio da Pietrelcina". In 1940 he died in an hotel in Frascati, where he was on holiday together with his wife Silvia and his two daughters Carmela and Maria Luisa. He was buried in the monumental cemetery of Campo Verano, in Rome.

== Bibliography ==
- Al Festa, La Grande Luce. Padre Pio - tra scienza e fede. La storia che ha dato origine al mistero di Padre Pio, Sail Productions srl, Roma 2002.
- Giorgio Festa, Misteri di scienza e luci di fede. Stigmate del padre Pio da Pietrelcina, Ferri, Roma 1938.
