= Padre Pio =

20th-century Italian saint, priest, stigmatist and mystic (1887–1968)

Saint Pio of Pietrelcina OFMCap
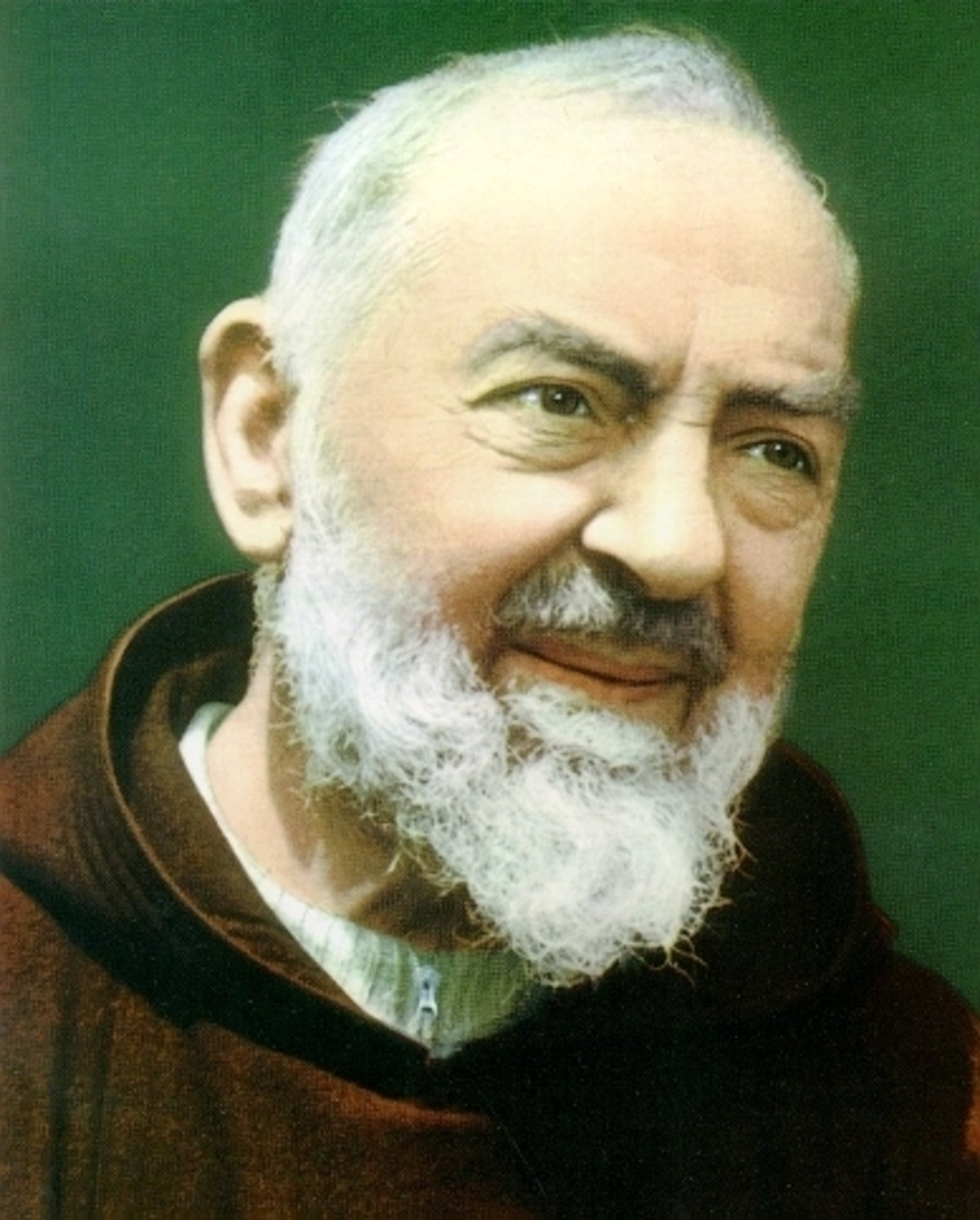
- Official portrait photograph of Padre Pio, c. 1947

Confessor of the Faith
- Born: Francesco Forgione; 25 May 1887; Pietrelcina, Province of Benevento, Kingdom of Italy
- Died: 23 September 1968 (aged 81); San Giovanni Rotondo, Foggia, Italy
- Resting place: Sanctuary of Saint Pio of Pietrelcina, San Giovanni Rotondo
- Venerated in: Catholic Church; Palmarian Church
- Beatified: 2 May 1999, St. Peter's Square, Vatican City by Pope John Paul II
- Canonized: 16 June 2002, St. Peter's Square, Vatican City by Pope John Paul II
- Major shrine: Sanctuary of Saint Pio of Pietrelcina, San Giovanni Rotondo, Italy; National Center of Padre Pio, Barto, Pennsylvania; Parish and International Shrine of Saint Padre Pio, Santo Tomas, Philippines
- Feast: 23 September
- Attributes: Stigmata, Franciscan habit, sacerdotal vestments
- Patronage: Civil defence volunteers, adolescents, Pietrelcina, stress relief, "January blues"

Pio of Pietrelcina (born Francesco Forgione; 25 May 1887 – 23 September 1968), widely known as Padre Pio ("Father Pio"), Latin: Pater Pius) was an Italian friar of the Order of Friars Minor Capuchin, priest, stigmatist and mystic. He is venerated as a saint in the Catholic Church, and the Palmarian Church; his feast day is celebrated on 23 September.

Francesco joined the Capuchins at 15, and spent most of his religious life in the monastery of San Giovanni Rotondo. As Padre Pio, he was known throughout his life for numerous instances of supernatural phenomena, most notably stigmata—wounds like those of Jesus Christ at his crucifixion—on his hands and feet and side. Several investigations into the phenomena were conducted by the Vatican; and although they led to temporary sanctions on his ministry, his reputation for sanctity continued to increase during his lifetime. He was also renowned for other mystical phenomena, and many other forms of spiritual outreach to individuals.

After his death, devotion to Padre Pio has continued to spread among believers worldwide, and especially throughout the Mezzogiorno. He was beatified on 2 May 1999 and canonized on 16 June 2002 by Pope John Paul II. His relics are exposed in the sanctuary of Saint Pio of Pietrelcina, next to the monastery of San Giovanni Rotondo, which is now a major pilgrimage site. His legacy also includes the Casa Sollievo della Sofferenza ("Home for the relief of suffering"), a hospital built near the monastery of San Giovanni Rotondo.

== Life ==
=== Early life ===
Francesco Forgione was born, on 25 May 1887 to Grazio Mario Forgione (1860–1946) and Maria Giuseppa Di Nunzio (1859–1929), in Pietrelcina, a small town located in the province of Benevento, in the Southern Italian region of Campania. His parents were peasant farmers who owned land in the Piana Romana. He had an older brother, Michele, and three younger sisters, Felicita, Pellegrina, and Grazia (who later became a nun of the Bridgettine Order). Two other children born to his parents died in infancy.

Francesco was baptized in the nearby Santa Anna Chapel, which stands upon the walls of a castle, and where he later served as an altar boy. At his baptism, he was christened Francesco, in honour of Saint Francis of Assisi. By the time he was five years old, he had already made the decision to dedicate his life to God, according to his own account. He worked on the land up until the age of 10, looking after his family's small flock of sheep.

The Forgione family was deeply religious, attending Mass daily, praying the Rosary nightly and abstaining from meat three days a week in honour of Our Lady of Mount Carmel. Although both Francesco's parents and grandparents were illiterate, they narrated Bible stories to him and his siblings.

According to the diary of Padre Agostino da San Marco in Lamis, who later became his spiritual director in San Marco in Lamis, the young Francesco was afflicted with a number of illnesses, suffering from severe gastroenteritis at six years old and typhoid fever at ten.

As a young boy, Francesco reported that he had experienced heavenly visions and ecstasies. In 1897, after he had completed three years at a public school, he was said to have been drawn to the life of a friar after listening to a young Capuchin from Sant'Elia a Pianisi who was in the countryside seeking donations. When Francesco expressed his desire to his parents, they traveled to Morcone, a community 13 miles (21 km) north of Pietrelcina, to find out if their son was eligible to enter the order. After meeting Francesco, the friars informed his parents that they were interested in accepting him into their community, but that he first needed to be better educated.

Accordingly, Francesco's father went to the United States in search of work to pay for private tutoring in order for his son to meet the academic requirements to enter the Capuchin Order. During this period, Francesco prepared to receive the sacrament of Confirmation, which occurred on 27 September 1899. He also underwent private tutoring and passed the stipulated academic requirements. On 6 January 1903, at the age of 15, he entered the novitiate of the Capuchin friars at Morcone. A few weeks later, on 22 January, he took the Franciscan habit and the name of Fra Pio (Friar Pius), in honour of Pope Pius I, whose relic is preserved in the Santa Anna Chapel in Pietrelcina, with the simple vows of poverty, chastity, and obedience.

=== Priesthood ===
Commencing his seven-year study for the priesthood, Padre Pio traveled to the friary of Saint Francis of Assisi in Umbria. At 17, he fell ill, experiencing loss of appetite, insomnia, exhaustion, fainting spells, and migraines, vomiting frequently and being able to digest only milk and cheese. Religious devotees point to this time as when inexplicable phenomena began to occur. During prayers, for example, he appeared to others to be in a stupor, as if he were absent from his body. One of his fellow friars later claimed to have seen him in ecstasy as well as levitating above the ground.

In June 1905, Padre Pio's health worsened to such an extent that his superiors decided to send him to a mountain monastery in the hope that the change of air would do him good. This had little impact on his health, however, and doctors advised that he return home. Even there his health failed to improve, yet he still made his solemn religious profession on 27 January 1907.

On 10 August 1910, he was ordained a priest by Archbishop Paolo Schinosi at the Cathedral of Benevento. Just four days later, he celebrated his first Mass at the parish church of Santa Maria degli Angeli (Our Lady of the Angels).

Because of his precarious health, Padre Pio was permitted to remain with his family in his hometown of Pietrelcina while still retaining the Capuchin habit. He stayed in Pietrelcina until 1916, due to his health and the need to take care of his family when his father and brother briefly emigrated to the United States. During these years, he frequently wrote letters of extraordinary literary beauty revealing his mystical experiences to his spiritual directors, Fathers Agostino and Benedetto, both friars from the Capuchin monastery of San Marco in Lamis.

=== Arrival at San Giovanni Rotondo ===
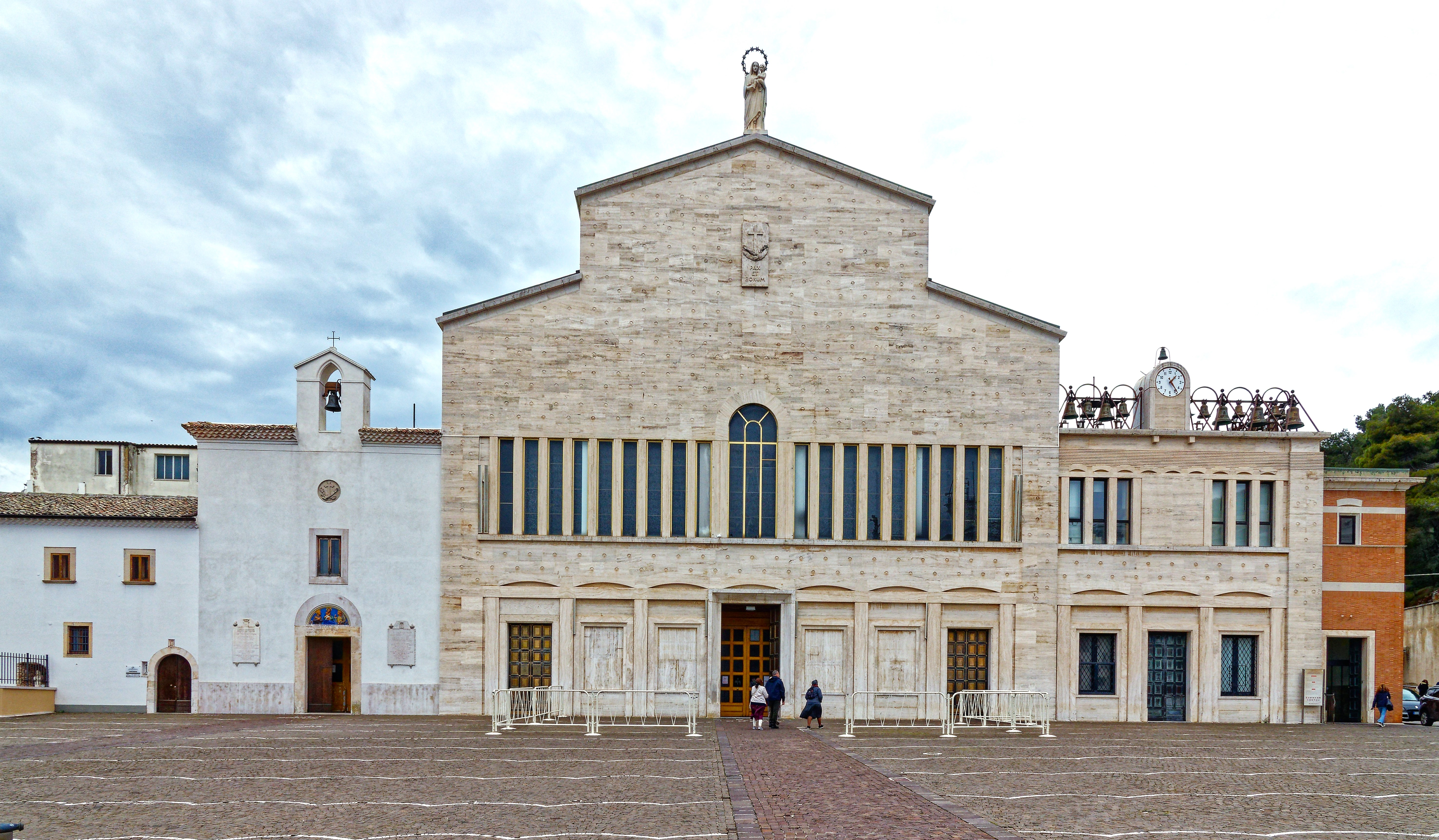
Church-shrine (Padre Pio's own church), San Giovanni Rotondo

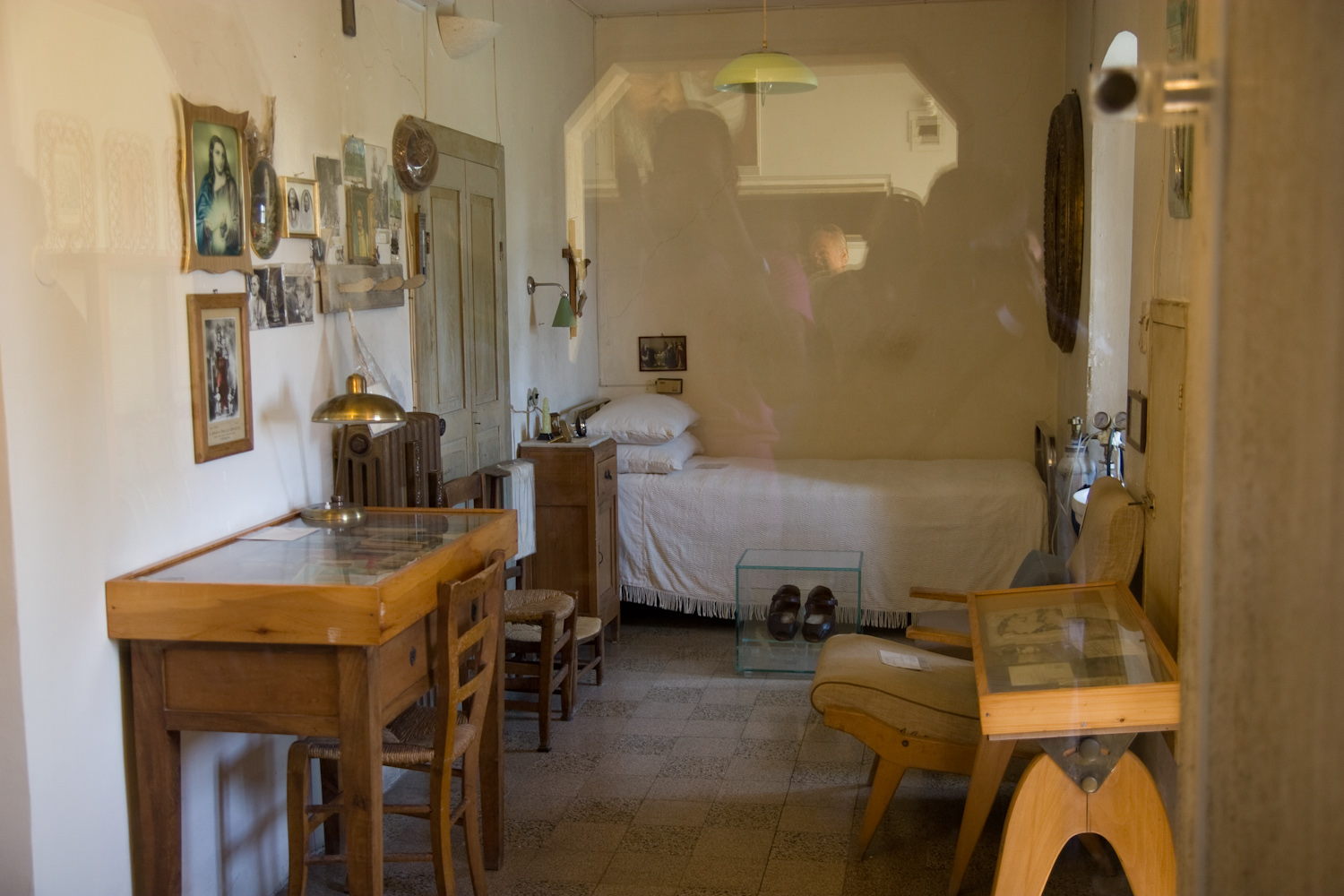
Padre Pio's monastery cell, San Giovanni Rotondo

On 4 September 1916, Padre Pio was ordered to return to his community life. He moved to an agricultural community, the Convento dei Cappuccini di Santa Maria delle Grazie (Capuchin Friary of Our Lady of Grace), located in the Gargano mountains in San Giovanni Rotondo in the Province of Foggia. At that time the community numbered seven friars. He remained in San Giovanni Rotondo until his death in 1968, except for a period of military service. During his priesthood, Padre Pio was known to have made thousands of successful conversions to Catholicism.

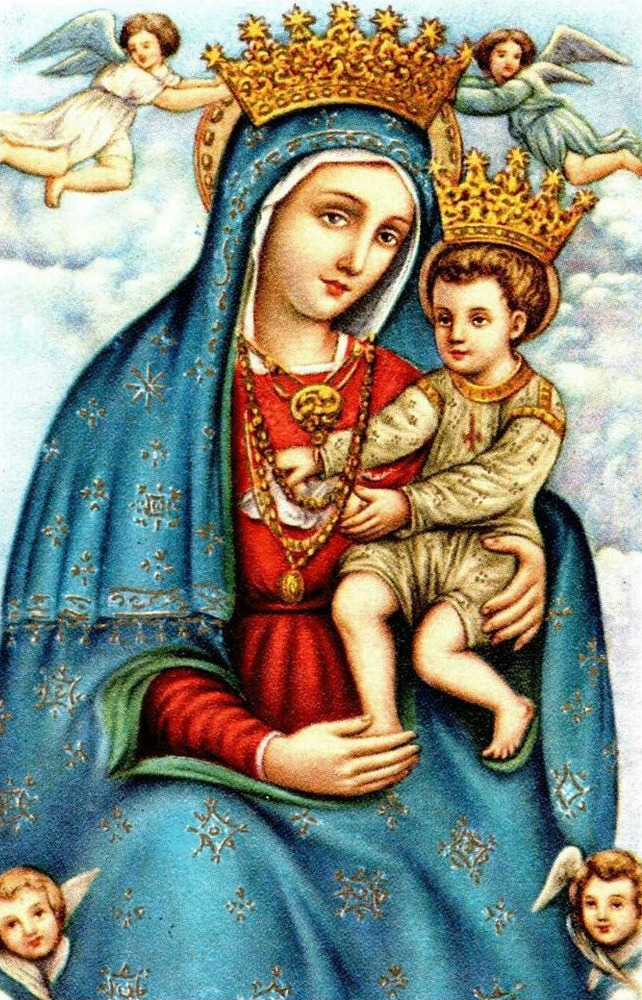
Image of Our Lady of Graces, San Giovanni Rotondo

Among his spiritual practices were rosary meditations, to which he was deeply devoted. He compared confession to dusting a room weekly, and recommended the performance of meditation and self-examination twice daily: once in the morning, as preparation to face the day, and once again in the evening, as retrospection. His advice on the practical application of theology he often summed up in his now-famous quote: Prega, spera e non preoccuparti (Pray, hope, and don't worry). He directed Christians to recognize God in all things and to desire above all things to do God's will.

Around 1913, at the age of 26, Padre Pio was asked by his spiritual directors to take on the spiritual direction of men and women who wished to progress in the spiritual life. His spiritual direction is recorded in his correspondence, published as Letters, Volumes I–V. According to Gerardo Flumeri, Padre Pio was "an enlightened guide of souls, sustained by an enviable theological, ascetic-mystical and Biblical training."

In 1928, one of his spiritual children, the wealthy heiress Mary Pyle, not only stayed in San Giovanni, but also built an impressive pink villa there. She welcomed many travelers, the poor, and World War II soldiers who had traversed the rough and steep mountainous terrain in order that they might meet and confess to Pio. Mary Pyle was instrumental in hosting Pio's mother during the Christmas of 1928. Giuseppa Forgione died in January 1929 after having contracted pneumonia. Years later Mary Pyle hosted Grazio, Pio's father, who lived in the pink castle for eight years until his death in the year 1946.

=== World War I and aftermath ===
At the start of World War I, four friars from Padre Pio's community were selected for military service in the Italian army. At that time, he was a teacher and spiritual director at the seminary. When one more friar was called into service, he was put in charge of the community; but on 15 November 1915, he too was drafted and on 6 December, assigned to the 10th Medical Corps in Naples. Due to poor health, however, he was continually discharged and recalled, until 16 March 1918, when he was declared unfit for service and given a full discharge.

In September of the same year, Padre Pio began to display the permanent wounds on his hands and feet known as "stigmata". In the following months, his reputation for sanctity grew rapidly in the regions surrounding San Giovanni Rotondo, attracting hundreds of believers to come see him each day.

People who had started rebuilding their lives after the war began to see in Padre Pio a symbol of hope. Those close to him have attested that he began to manifest several spiritual gifts, including healing; bilocation; levitation; prophecy; miracles; reading of hearts; speaking in tongues; making conversions; the odour of sanctity; and extraordinary abstinence from both sleep and nourishment: one account from a Capuchin friar even states that Padre Pio, during his stay at a convent in Venafro, was able to subsist for at least 20 days on only the Holy Eucharist without other nourishment.

Padre Pio's fame grew exponentially among the wider populace. He became a spiritual director, and it was around this time that he developed his five rules for spiritual growth: weekly confession, daily Communion, daily spiritual reading, meditation, and examination of one's own conscience.

=== La Casa Sollievo della Sofferenza hospital ===
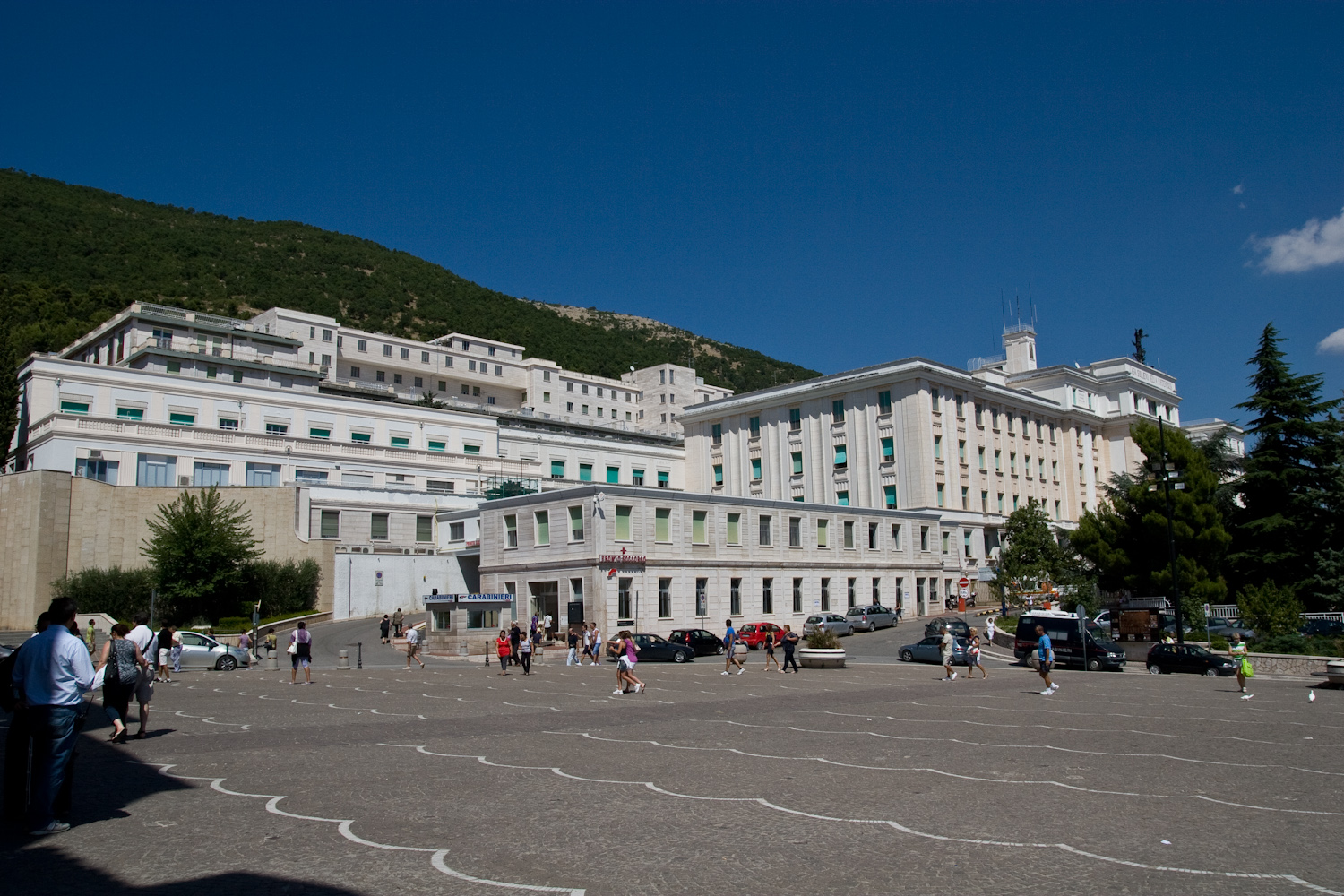
La Casa Sollievo della Sofferenza, the hospital built on Padre Pio's initiative. San Giovanni Rotondo.

By 1925, Padre Pio had converted an old convent building into a medical clinic with a few beds, intended primarily for people in extreme need. However, in 1938 an earthquake destroyed the hospital and Padre Pio was "determined to build a large, modern hospital near the friary". In 1940, a committee was formed under the direction of Padre Pio to establish a larger clinic and donations started to pour in. Construction began in 1947.

On 9 January 1940 a committee was set up to help realize his dream for a hospital which would welcome everyone: poor and affluent alike. On that fateful day Padre Pio said "This evening my earthly work has begun. I bless you and all those who will contribute to this work..." According to Italian historian Sergio Luzzatto, a generous contribution came from Emanuele Brunatto, a keen follower of Padre Pio, who had made his fortune in the black market in German-occupied France. Brunatto donated "...as a 'reparation' for his sins, ...3.5 million francs." With the influence and help of the then Director General of UNRRA, Fiorello La Guardia, Barbara Ward (British economist) and Dr. Guglielmo Sanguinetti (physician and Padre Pio's confident and board member of the Casa) promoted the cause to the United Nations Relief and Rehabilitation Administration (UNRRA) which eventually contributed 400 million Italian lire (the Italian government remitted the sum of only 250,000 million to go to the Casa). UNRRA's engagement was facilitated by Lodovico Montini, head of the Christian Democracy party, and his brother Giovanni Battista Montini (later Pope Paul VI).

The hospital was initially to be named "Fiorello LaGuardia", but was eventually named by Padre Pio himself, opening as La Casa Sollievo della Sofferenza (Home for the Relief of Suffering) in 1956. Out of obedience to the Holy See, Padre Pio handed direct control over to the Holy See, but Pope Pius XII granted him a dispensation from his vow of poverty in 1957 so he could directly supervise the project. Some of Padre Pio's opponents and detractors subsequently suggested there had been misappropriation of funds.

=== Death ===
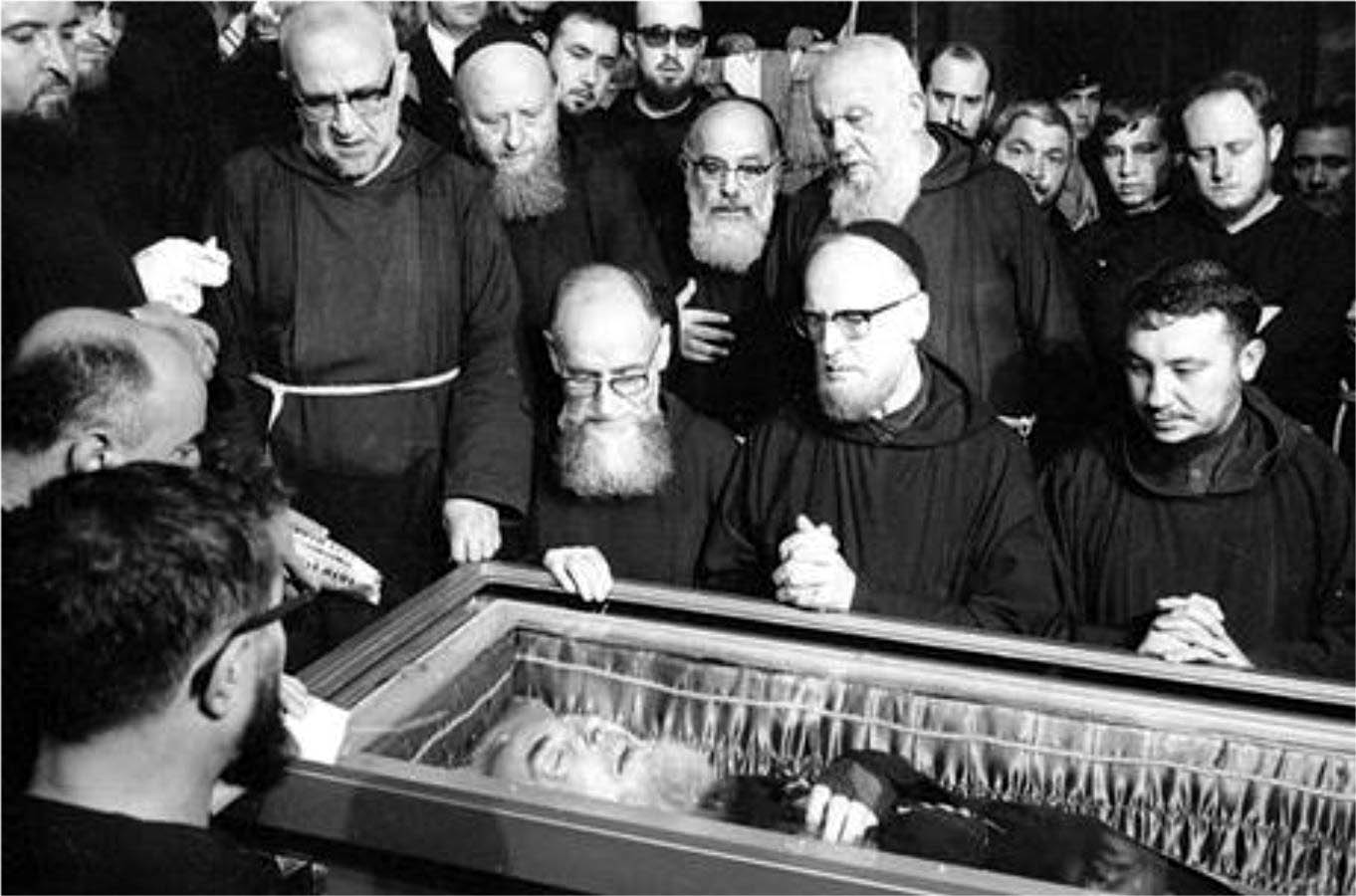
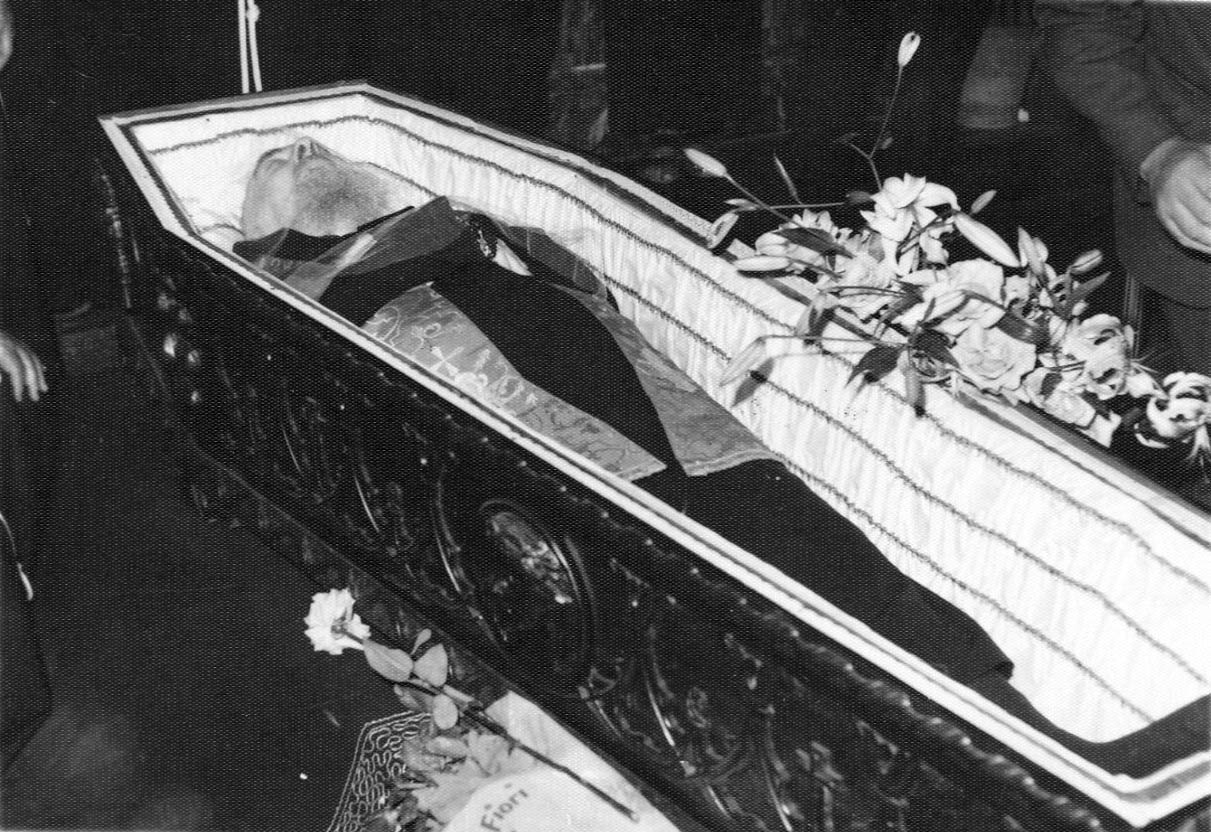
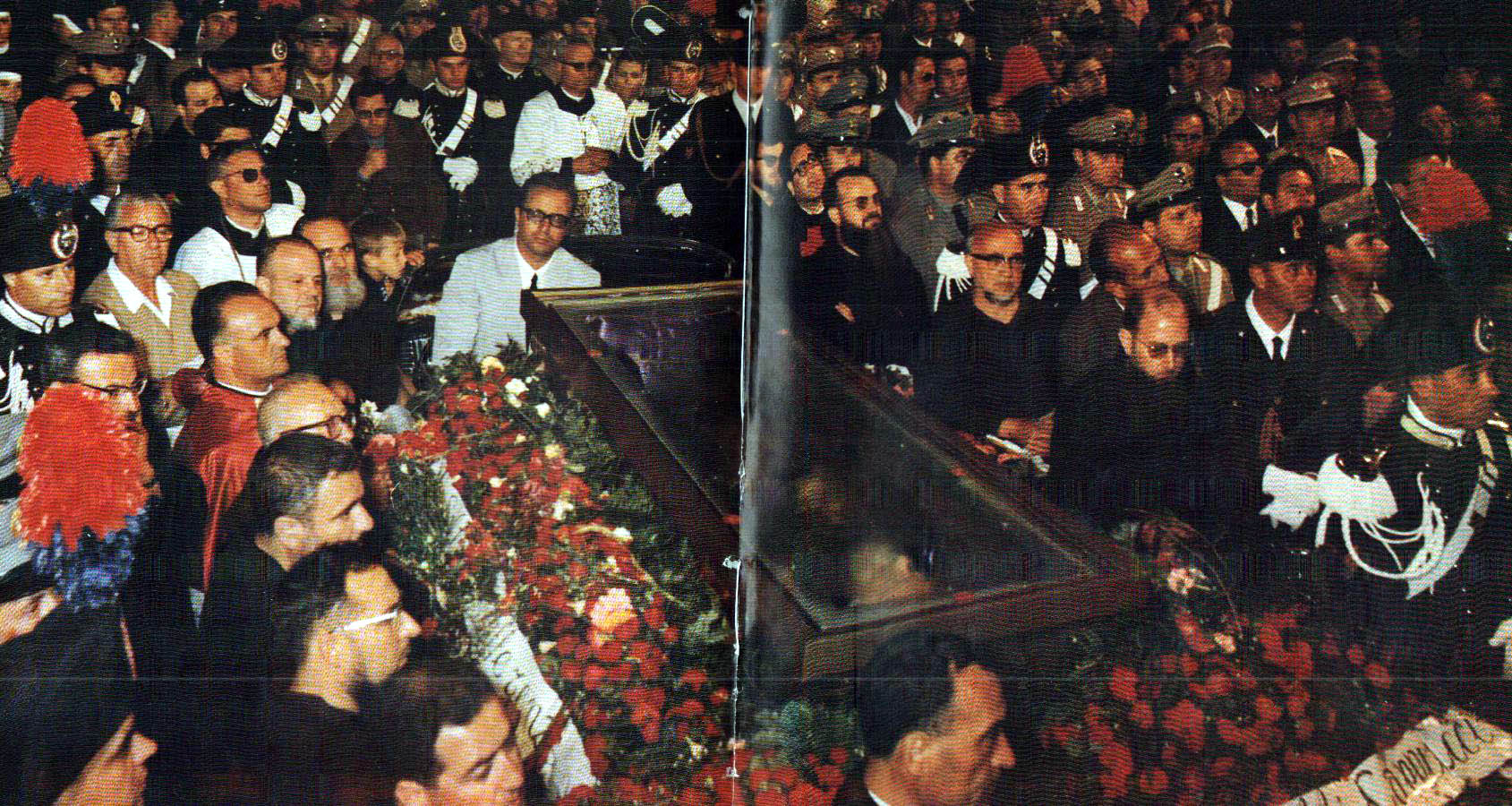
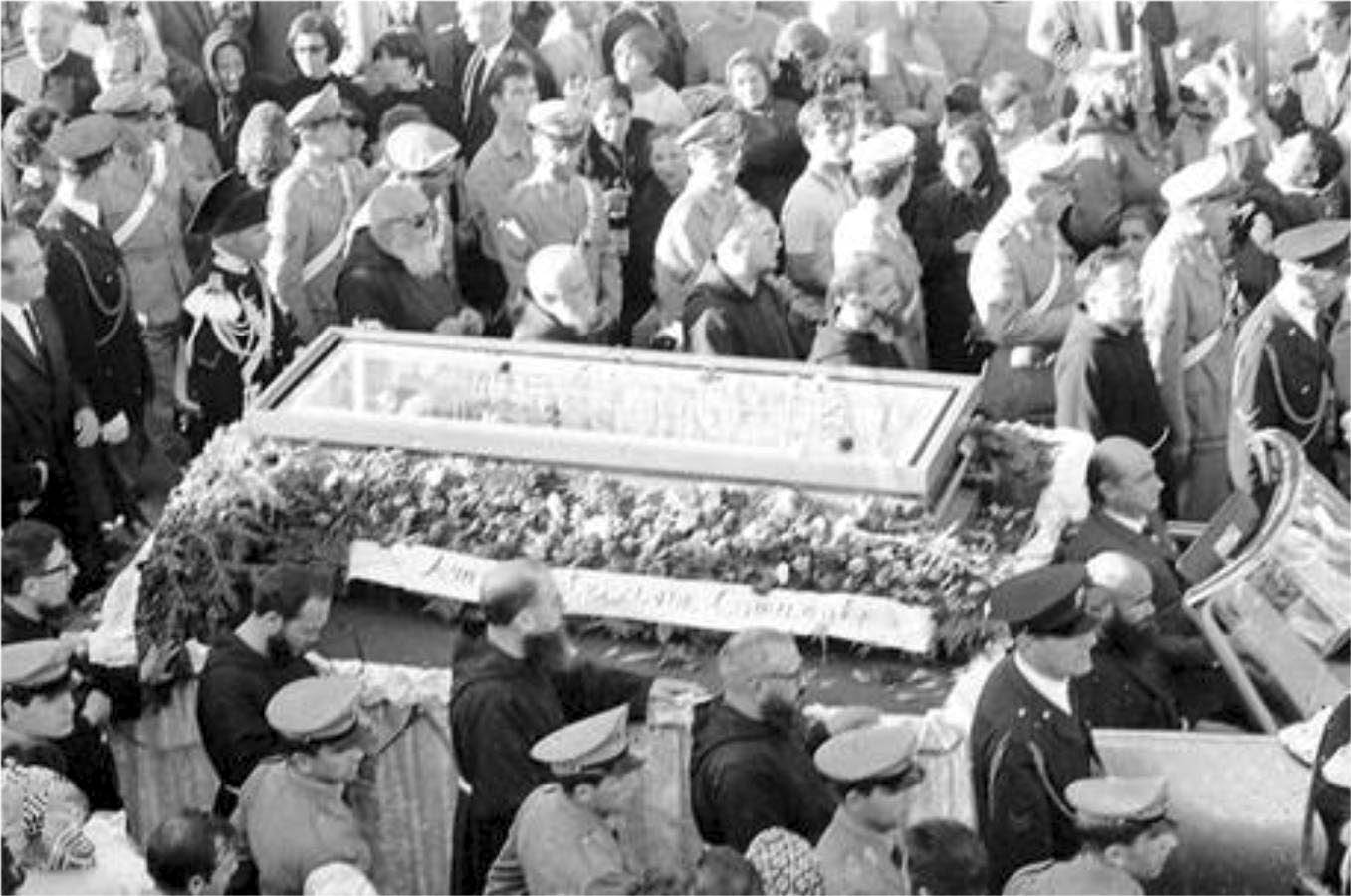
Photos of Pio's funeral ceremony, attended by nearly 100,000, and procession

Although Padre Pio's health deteriorated in the 1960s, he continued his spiritual works. On 22 September 1968, he celebrated a Mass in recognition of the fiftieth anniversary of receiving his stigmata, with a large crowd of pilgrims present to celebrate the event as well as television crews.

Due to the overwhelmingly large crowd present for the Mass, the superior of the monastery decided that it should be a Solemn Mass, which is more demanding to celebrate than a Low Mass. Padre Pio carried out his duties but appeared extremely frail. His voice was weak, and after the conclusion of Mass he nearly collapsed while walking down the altar steps but was aided by his Capuchin brothers. This was his last celebration of Mass.

Early the next morning, 23 September, Padre Pio made his last confession and renewed his Franciscan vows. As was his custom, he held his rosary in his hands, though he did not have the strength to pray the Hail Marys aloud, instead repeating the words Gesù, Maria ("Jesus, Mary"). He died in his cell in San Giovanni Rotondo around 2:30 a.m. at the age of 81.

A few days prior to his death, his stigmata had disappeared. When the doctor who was present at his deathbed examined his body, he observed that the wounds of the stigmata had completely healed, without leaving behind any trace or scar.

Padre Pio's body was placed in a coffin in the church of the monastery to allow pilgrims to pay their respects. The funeral ceremony was held on 26 September, with an estimated 100,000 people attending. After a funeral procession in the town of San Giovanni Rotondo and the funeral Mass, he was buried in the crypt in the church of Our Lady of Grace.

== Supernatural phenomena ==
Among the mystical gifts that Padre Pio was said to have were the ability to bilocate (the ability to be in two places at the same time), read souls, and work favours and healings before they were requested of him. His reported supernatural experiences also include celestial visions, communication with angels, and physical attacks from demons, including Satan himself. Reports of supernatural phenomena surrounding Padre Pio—some of which he himself reported in letters he wrote to his spiritual directors, others reported by his followers—attracted fame and amazement, even if some quarters within the Vatican remained skeptical.

=== Stigmata ===
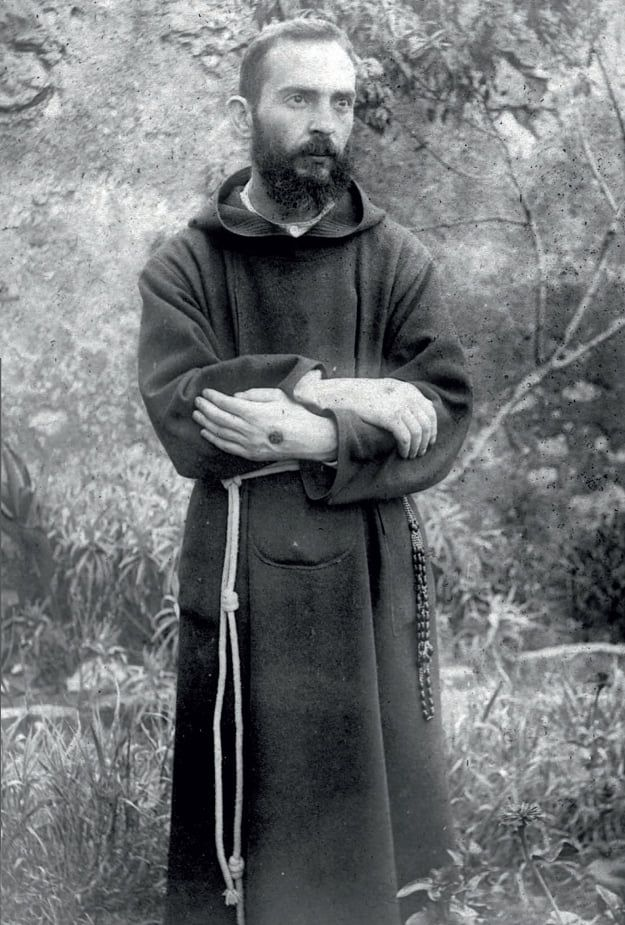
Padre Pio showing the stigmata (photo from 19 August 1919)

Padre Pio wrote in his letters that early in his priesthood he experienced bodily marks, pain, and bleeding in locations indicative of the not-yet-visible stigmata. In a letter to his spiritual companion and confessor Father Agostino dated 21 March 1912, Padre Pio wrote of his devotion to the mystical body of Christ and the intuition that he would bear the stigmata.

Luzzatto, however, alleges that in this letter Padre Pio uses unrecognised passages from a book by the stigmatised mystic Saint Gemma Galgani.

In a 1915 letter, Padre Agostino asked Padre Pio specific questions about his supernatural experiences. To the question of when he first experienced visions, he replied that he had had them since his novitiate period (1903 to 1904). To the question of whether he was a stigmatic, he responded that he was; and to the question of whether he felt the pains of the Passion of Christ, namely his scourging and the crowning with thorns, he responded that he did. He added, however, that he had been so terrified by the phenomenon that he begged God to withdraw the stigmata but not remove the pain, only the visible wounds, as he considered them an indescribable, almost unbearable, humiliation.

On 20 September 1918, while hearing confessions, Padre Pio is said to have experienced the reappearance of the 5-wounds of Christ referred to as the stigmata. He bore the painful stigmata for 50 years, until the end of his life. Moreover, the blood flowing from the wounds purportedly had the odour of violet/roses/lily flowers. He conveyed to his Father Lector, Agostino, that the pain from his five wounds remained and was more acute on specific days and under certain circumstances. Though he said he would have preferred to suffer in secret, by early 1919, news that Padre Pio was a stigmatic had begun to spread. He often wore red mittens or black coverings on his hands and feet, saying that he was embarrassed by the marks.

Initially, Amico Bignami considered that the wounds might be a skin necrosis that was hindered from healing through the use of iodine tincture or similar chemicals. Agostino Gemelli, who never examined Padre Pio's stigmata, and on the strength of one short visit, claimed that the wounds were consistent with those that soldiers had inflicted on themselves "by the use of a caustic substance".

Once made public, the wounds were studied by a number of physicians, some hired by the Vatican as part of an independent investigation, the topic of the next section below. Some claimed that the wounds were unexplainable based on the fact that contrary to the natural course of a wounds trajectory, the wounds never healed nor did they become infected. Alberto Caserta took X-rays of Pio's hands in 1954 and found no abnormality in the bone structure.

Some critics hostile to Padre Pio and the Friars of San Giovanni directly accused Padre Pio of faking the stigmata, for example by using carbolic acid to make the wounds. Maria De Vito, cousin of the local pharmacist Valentini Vista at Foggia, testified that the young Padre Pio bought carbolic acid and the great quantity of four grams of veratrine "without presenting any medical prescription whatsoever" and "in great secret". As the pharmacist Vista stated in front of witnesses, veratrine is a "mixture of alkaloids", a "highly caustic product" and "so poisonous, that only a doctor can decide whether to prescribe it". Veratrine was once used as a paralyzing muscle insecticide, primarily against lice, but was also described by pharmacists as an "external stimulant" that renders one insensitive to pain.

Padre Pio maintained that the carbolic acid was used to sterilize syringes used for medical treatments and that after being subjected to a practical joke in which veratrine was mixed with snuff tobacco, causing uncontrollable sneezing after ingestion, he decided to acquire his own quantity of the substance in order to play the same joke on his confreres. The bishop of Volterra, Raffaele Rossi, came to share this view, believing that "[i]nstead of malice, what is revealed here is Padre Pio's simplicity, and his playful spirit", and that "the stigmata at issue [were] not a work of the devil, nor a gross deceit, a fraud, the trick of a devious and malicious person" nor did they seem to him "a morbid product of external suggestion". Rossi viewed these stigmata as a "real fact".

=== Transverberation ===
In August 1918, a few weeks before reportedly receiving the stigmata, Padre Pio described a mystical experience during which he felt being pierced and burnt spiritually and physically. According to what he said, this began on 5 August and ended on the 7th. Father Benedetto, his spiritual director, interpreted this phenomenon as a transverberation. Padre Pio later claimed that this experience left a physical wound on his left side, described by most of the witnesses who examined his wounds as around three inches (7.62 cm) long in the shape of a cross.

On March 1919 Padre Pio's Spiritual Director, Padre Benedetto spent a number of days at the Friary and finally examined the stigmata—he was profoundly shocked by what he saw: "...there are no spots or imprints but real wounds which perforate his [Padre Pio's] hands and feet. I have observed the wound in his side, a veritable gash from which blood or a blood-red secretion flows continually."

=== Bilocation ===
Padre Pio was believed to have the gift of bilocation, the ability to be in two places at the same time. When Bishop Rossi asked him about it as part of a Vatican inquiry, Padre Pio replied: "I don't know how it is or the nature of this phenomenon—and I certainly don't give it much thought—but it did happen to me to be in the presence of this or that person, to be in this or that place; I do not know whether my mind was transported there, or what I saw was some sort of representation of the place or the person; I do not know whether I was there with my body or without it."

=== Healing ===
In the 1999 book Padre Pio: The Wonder Worker, a segment by Irish priest Malachy Gerard Carroll describes the story of Gemma de Giorgi, a Sicilian girl whose blindness was believed to have been cured during a visit to Padre Pio. Gemma, who was brought to San Giovanni Rotondo in 1947 by her grandmother, was born without pupils. During her trip to see Padre Pio, the little girl began to see objects, including a steamboat and the sea. Her grandmother, however, did not believe the child had been healed. But when Gemma forgot to ask Padre Pio for grace during her confession, her grandmother implored the priest to ask God to restore her sight. He told her, "The child must not weep and neither must you for the child sees and you know she sees".

=== Prophecy ===
In 1947, 27-year-old Father Karol Józef Wojtyła (later Pope John Paul II) visited Padre Pio, who heard his confession. Austrian Cardinal Alfons Stickler reported that Wojtyła confided to him that during this meeting, Padre Pio told him he would one day ascend to "the highest post in the church". Stickler said Wojtyła believed that the prophecy was fulfilled when he became a cardinal. However, another account of the encounter from Father John Aurilia, who served as Pio's secretary for a few years, related that Padre Pio simply referred to Wojtyła as "your holiness", a title used exclusively to address a pope, and asked for Wojtyła's blessing. Furthermore John Paul's secretary, Stanisław Dziwisz, denies the prediction; and George Weigel's biography Witness to Hope, which contains an account of the same visit, does not mention it.

=== Other phenomena ===
Rossi described in Padre Pio a "very intense and pleasant fragrance, similar to the scent of the violet", but he was unable to determine its origin.

He also confirmed to Rossi that a few times he "happened to feel inside [him] with clarity someone's fault, or sin, or virtue, of people of whom [he] had some knowledge, at least generally", and that he had visions seen through the eyes of the intellect, accounts of diabolical assaults and harassment against him, and malicious visions under human and beastly shape.

== Vatican investigations and declarations ==
In the 1920s, the Vatican imposed severe sanctions on Padre Pio to reduce publicity about him, forbidding him from celebrating the Holy Mass in public, hearing confessions, giving blessings, answering letters, publicly displaying his stigmata, and communicating with Father Benedetto, his spiritual director.

The church authorities also decided that Padre Pio be relocated to another monastery in northern Italy, but when the local people threatened to riot, the Vatican left him where he was. A second plan for his removal was also cancelled. Nevertheless, from 1921 to 1922 he was prevented from publicly performing his priestly duties such as hearing confessions and celebrating Mass publicly. From 1923 to 1931, the Holy See made statements denying that the events in his life were due to divine cause. In particular, the Holy Office (what is now the Dicastery for the Doctrine of the Faith) issued a formal statement in May 1923 that nothing supernatural had been proven about Padre Pio, and warned the public not to rely on his claims.

Eventually, Padre Pio was effectively confined within the cloister of his friary. As Luzzatto states, he came to be seen as a prisoner in his own monastery.

=== Luigi Romanelli, medical examination (1919) ===
A large number of doctors visited Padre Pio to verify whether the stigmata were real. The first to study his wounds was Luigi Romanelli, chief physician of the civil hospital of Barletta, by order of the provincial father superior on 15 and 16 May 1919. In his report, among other comments, Romanelli wrote:

The lesions on his hands are covered with a membrane that is reddish-brown in colour, without any bleeding, swelling, or inflammation of the surrounding tissue. I am convinced without a doubt that the wounds are not just superficial. When I press together my thumb on the palm of his hand and my index finger on the back of his hand, I clearly perceive that a vacuum exists between them.

=== Amico Bignami, medical examination (1919) ===
Two months later, on 26 July, pathologist Amico Bignami arrived in San Giovanni Rotondo. He conducted a medical examination of Padre Pio's wounds and proposed several hypotheses, among which was that they were a skin necrosis hindered from healing by chemicals such as iodine tincture.

=== Giorgio Festa, medical examinations (1919 and 1920) ===
Giorgio Festa, a physician, examined Padre Pio twice, in 1919 and 1920, and was quite impressed by the fragrance of the stigmata. Festa, as Bignami before, described the side wound as cruciform. In his 1925 report to the Holy Office, Festa arrived at a positive verdict, with theological arguments playing the lead role, writing that the stigmata were "not the product of a trauma of external origin, nor ... due to the application of potently irritating chemicals".

=== Agostino Gemelli, psychiatric examination (1920) and medical examination (1925) ===
In 1920, Father Agostino Gemelli—a physician as well as a psychologist—visited Padre Pio to carry out a clinical examination of the wounds. Castelli states that he was commissioned to do so by Cardinal Rafael Merry del Val, while Luzzatto instead states that he did so of his own volition, with no interference by any ecclesiastical authority.

Since Padre Pio was under strict orders from the Vatican, Padre Pio refused to have his stigmata examined by Gemelli, unless he could provide written authorization from the Holy Office. Gemelli was deeply angered and insulted by the refusal, yet his protests were in vain, and Gemelli left highly irritated and offended, having been unable to perform the examination. He immediately wrote a scathing piece charging that Padre Pio was "a narrow-minded man, with low mental activity, monotonous ideations, avolition", adding the further criticism that the case was "one of suggestion unconsciously planted by Father Benedetto in a feeble-minded individual such as Padre Pio, producing those characteristic manifestations of psittacism that are intrinsic to the hysteric mind". He advised that Padre Pio be kept under strict observation, and that all contact between him and Father Benedetto be prohibited.

Physician Festa attempted to question Gemelli's comments on the phenomenon of 'stigmata' in general, Gemelli resorted to drawing on his general knowledge of self-inflicted wounds, clarifying his statements about the nature of Padre Pio's wounds which he never examined:

Anyone with experience in forensic medicine, and above all in the wide variety of sores and wounds that self-harming soldiers presented with during the war, can have no doubt that these were wounds of erosion caused by the use of caustic substances. The base of the sores and their shape are in every way similar to the sores observed in soldiers who procured them through chemical means.

Beginning in 1940, Gemelli wrote to the Holy Office multiple times, regarding what he considered to be unjustified claims to Padre Pio's sanctity.

=== Raffaele Rossi, first apostolic visitation (1921) ===
The Carmelite Bishop of Volterra, Raffaele Rossi, was formally commissioned on 11 June 1921 by the Holy Office to make a canonical inquiry concerning Padre Pio. Rossi began his apostolic visitation to San Giovanni Rotondo three days later on the 14th with the interrogation of witnesses, two diocesan priests and seven friars.

After eight days of investigation, he completed a benevolent report, which he sent to the Holy Office on 4 October, the feast of St. Francis of Assisi. His report, extensive and detailed, essentially stated the following: Padre Pio, of whom Rossi had a favourable impression, was a good religious, and the San Giovanni Rotondo monastery a good community. Although the stigmata could not be explained, they certainly were not a work of the devil or an act of gross deceit or fraud; neither were they the trick of a devious and malicious person. During interviews with witnesses, which Rossi undertook a total of three times, he let himself be shown the stigmata of the then-34-year-old Padre Pio, which he viewed as a "real fact".

In Rossi's notes and in his final report, he described the shape and appearance of the wounds. Those in the hands were "very visible". Those in the feet were "disappearing. What could be observed resembled two dot-shaped elevations [literally: 'buttons'] with whiter and gentler skin." As for the chest, Rossi said: "In [Padre Pio's] side, the sign is represented by a triangular spot, the colour of red wine, and by other smaller ones, not anymore, then, by a sort of upside-down cross such as the one seen in 1919 by Dr. Bignami and Dr. Festa." Rossi also made a request to the Holy Office to receive a copy of the material he had collected so that he could one day write about Padre Pio's life.

According to Rossi: "Of the alleged healings, many are unconfirmed or non-existent. In Padre Pio's correspondence, however, there are some credible declarations that attribute miracles to his intercession. But without medical confirmation, it is difficult to reach a conclusion, and the issue remains open." According to Lucia Ceci, Rossi could not find proof of any of the attributed miracles.

When Rossi asked Padre Pio about bilocation, he replied:

I don't know how it is or the nature of this phenomenon—and I certainly don't give it much thought—but it did happen to me to be in the presence of this or that person, to be in this or that place; I do not know whether my mind was transported there, or what I saw was some sort of representation of the place or the person; I do not know whether I was there with my body or without it.

=== Pope John XXIII, investigations and tape recordings (The Second Decade of Tribulations 1952-1962) ===
At the beginning of his tenure John XXIII was at first skeptical of Padre Pio. His opponents had placed listening devices in his monastery cell and confessional, attempting to record his confessions. Outside John XXIII's semi-official journal, the pope wrote about concerns regarding Padre Pio based on the falsified reports of alleged indiscretions from his "praetorian guard". The pope himself, however, probably never listened to the tapes. (According to Luzzatto, the Vatican had not ordered this wiretap. C Benard Ruffin relates that after extensive examinations the tapes revealed nothing but humming noises and soft confessional voices.) In another journal note, John XXIII wrote that he not only wanted to take action but had in fact also ordered another apostolic visitation.

=== Carlo Maccari, second apostolic visitation (1960) ===
John XXIII directed Father Carlo Maccari, secretary-general of the Diocese of Rome, to investigate Padre Pio (the character of the nine meetings were described as "odious and inappropriate.") There was reciprocal mistrust between the two men. Maccari wrote in his diary: "Reticence, narrowness of mind, lies—these are the weapons he uses to evade my questions ... Overall impression: pitiful." In general, Maccari saw too much mixing of the "sacred" and the "all too human".

Maccari also noted in his report the names of the women who claimed at the time to have been the lovers of Padre Pio, but without assessing the veracity of their statements. Maccari focused on assessing the fanaticism of Padre Pio's social environment, describing it as "religious conceptions that oscillate between superstition and magic", and called Pio's supporters "a vast and dangerous organization" who were never advised to moderation. He wondered how God could allow "so much deception".

He finished his report with a list of recommendations for further dealing with Padre Pio: that the brothers of Our Lady of Grace should gradually be relocated; that a new abbot should come from outside the region; that no one should be allowed to confess to Padre Pio more than once a month; and that the hospital should be given new statutes to sever the responsibilities of the medical and spiritual "healing" Capuchins. Following Maccari's apostolic visitation, John XXIII noted in his diary that he viewed Padre Pio as a "straw idol" (Italian: idolo di stoppa).

=== Rehabilitation (1930s to mid-1960s) ===
In 1933, Pope Pius XI ordered a reversal of the ban on Pio's public celebration of Mass, arguing: "I have not been badly disposed toward Padre Pio, but I have been badly informed." In 1934, Padre Pio was again allowed to hear confessions. He was also given honorary permission to preach despite never having taken the exam for the preaching license. Pope Pius XII, who assumed the papacy in 1939, even encouraged devotees to visit Padre Pio.

In the mid-1960s, Pope Paul VI dismissed all accusations against Padre Pio.

== Personal views ==
=== On religion ===
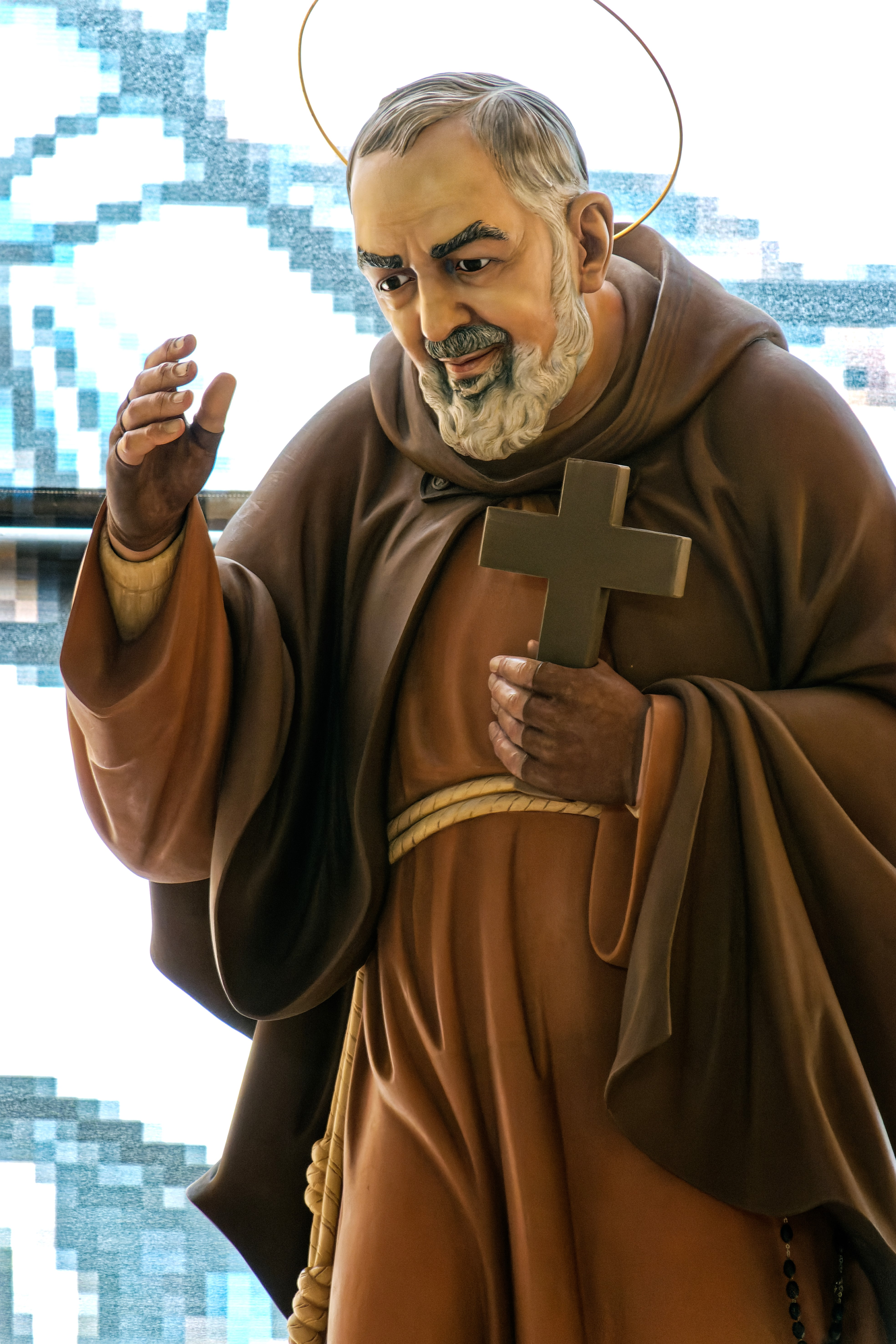
Statue of Padre Pio of Pietrelcina at the Sanctuary of Saint Padre Pio of Pietrelcina, San Giovanni Rotondo

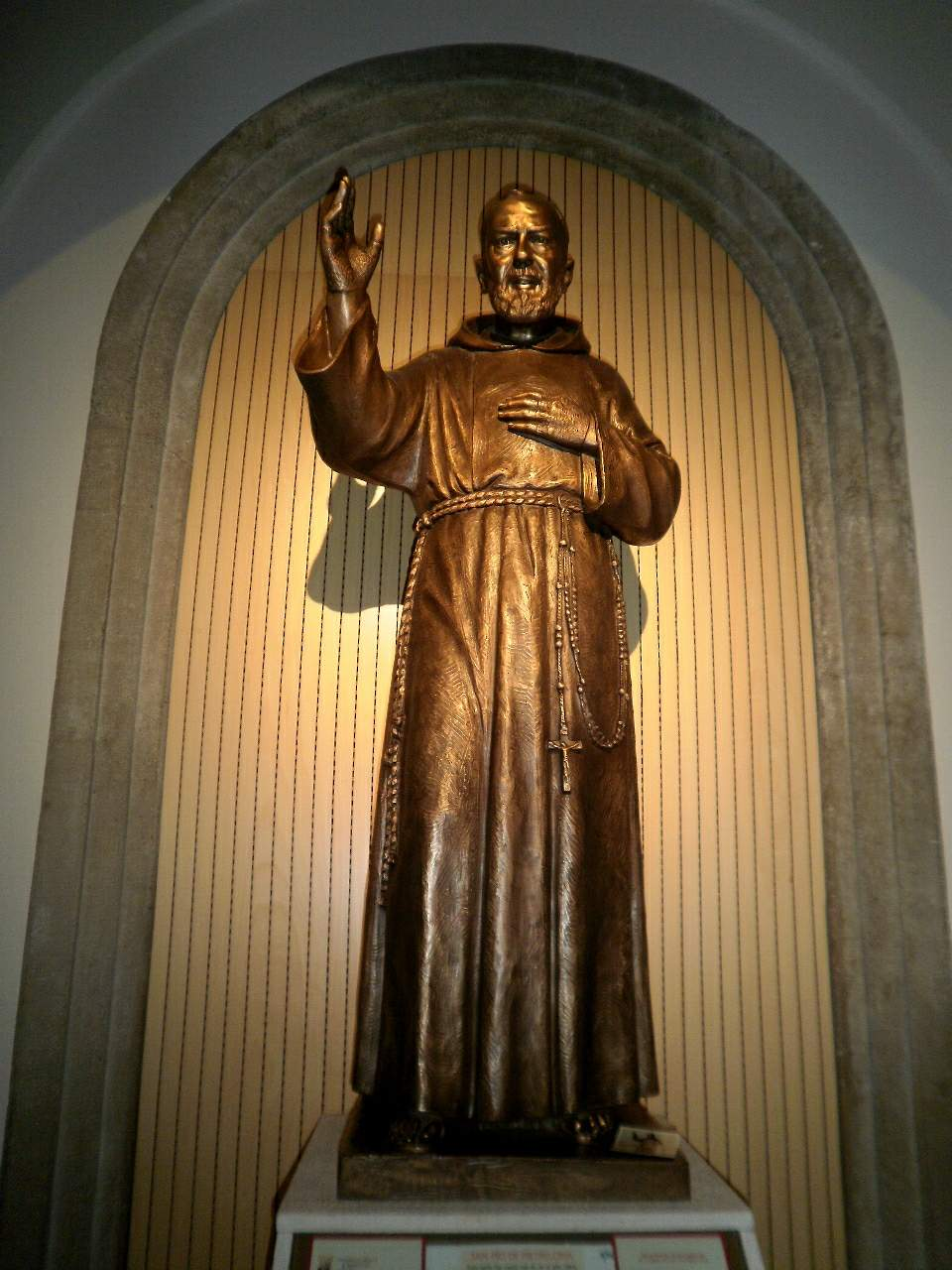
Sculpture of Pio of Pietrelcina in the Franciscan San Antonio Church, Pamplona, Spain

Padre Pio was a strong proponent of weekly confession, describing it as "the soul's bath". He established five rules for spiritual growth, which included weekly confession, daily communion, spiritual reading, meditation, and frequent examination of one's conscience. He taught his spiritual followers that suffering was a special sign of God's love, for it made them "resemble His divine son in His anguish in the desert and on the hill of Calvary".

In the confessional, Padre Pio was harsh to individuals who appeared insincere in their repentance, oftentimes dismissing them and refusing them absolution until they made things right in their personal lives. In contrast, he was gentle to those who came to him sincere in their repentance. His general attitude towards others was marked by jovial and sincere empathy, although his comments and sense of humor could be read as abrupt. Once, when confronted for this behavior, he responded “I act like that so that I don't let myself be overcome with emotion. Seeing people suffer is enough to bring me to tears, and then I would no longer be able to continue my ministry.” His attitude towards his own supernatural experiences was likewise rooted in practical humility, as he has once cited them as "a mystery for me too".

As time passed, cultural tensions grew between traditional and modern styles of dress. On January 12, 1930, Pope Pius XI issued a papal decree "concerning modesty" in which guidelines were established for "marylike standards for modesty in dress". In the spirit of obedience, Padre Pio—a staunch advocate for modesty and authentic spirituality—more frequently dismissed individuals from confession for inappropriate dress. Likewise, his concerned Franciscan brothers hung a sign on the church door that read "By Padre Pio's explicit wish, women must enter his confessional wearing skirts at least 8 inches below the knees".

Although Padre Pio was concerned about liturgical changes following the Second Vatican Council, he emphasized obedience to the church. His blood sister, Grazia, was a traditionalist nun who left her order at the age of 70 because she was upset at changes made by her liberal superiors following the Council. When Pio met her shortly after, he burst into tears and snapped at her over this decision, telling his sister: "They are wrong and you are right, but you still must obey. You must return." She refused, causing him to weep uncontrollably and continue praying for her.

After World War II, Pio's nephew Ettorne Masone asked Padre Pio for advice on opening a movie house. Padre Pio warned him to be careful about what movies he would show, saying, "You don't want to contribute to the propagation of evil". Padre Pio was likewise cautious about the growing popularity of television, even as it became permitted among Capuchins by the late 1950s. Nevertheless, he allowed himself to be filmed a few times throughout his life, and in one clip can be seen playfully teasing the filmmakers. Furthermore, an interview with Father John Aurillia in 2021 suggests Padre Pio participated in at least one televised interview for a local station before his death in 1968, although the quote cited from the interview was one he frequently used throughout his life: "I want to be a poor friar who prays".

Following the publication of the encyclical Humanae vitae, Padre Pio was distraught over criticism aimed at it. He wrote to Pope Paul VI over this, affirming his obedience to the Church's teaching on birth control and reassuring the pope in his time of need. Padre Pio informed him that he would offer up his daily prayers and suffering for him, due to Paul VI's defence of "eternal truth, which never changes with the passing of years".

=== On politics ===
Before Benito Mussolini ushered a period of fascism into Italy, Padre Pio was generally unconcerned about politics, only fearing communism because of its anti-liturgical bent. Luzzatto, who dealt with the history of Italian fascism, wrote of numerous episodes where (in his opinion) the lives of Padre Pio and pre-Mussolini fascism intersected. The most notable example is Padre Pio's relationship with Foggia native and fascist politician, Giuseppe Caradonna. Padre Pio served as a confessor to Caradonna and members of his militia,. Caradonna mounted a "praetorian guard" around the friar to prevent any attempts to remove him from the monastery and transfer him elsewhere.

When Mussolini came into power, Padre Pio's attitude towards fascism quickly soured. When visited by one of Mussolini's messengers, Padre Pio yelled at him: "So now you come to me, after you have destroyed Italy. You can tell Mussolini that nothing can save Italy now! Nothing!" Padre Pio was friendly to American soldiers stationed near San Giovanni Rotondo during World War II and thought highly of US President Franklin D. Roosevelt, whom he described as a "great man".

In 1948, in a letter written to Alcide De Gasperi, Padre Pio noted his support for the Christian Democracy Party. Italian communists despised Padre Pio, as they blamed his influence for their losses in several general elections during the 1940s. One communist spokesman grumbled that Padre Pio's presence at the voting polls had taken votes away from them.

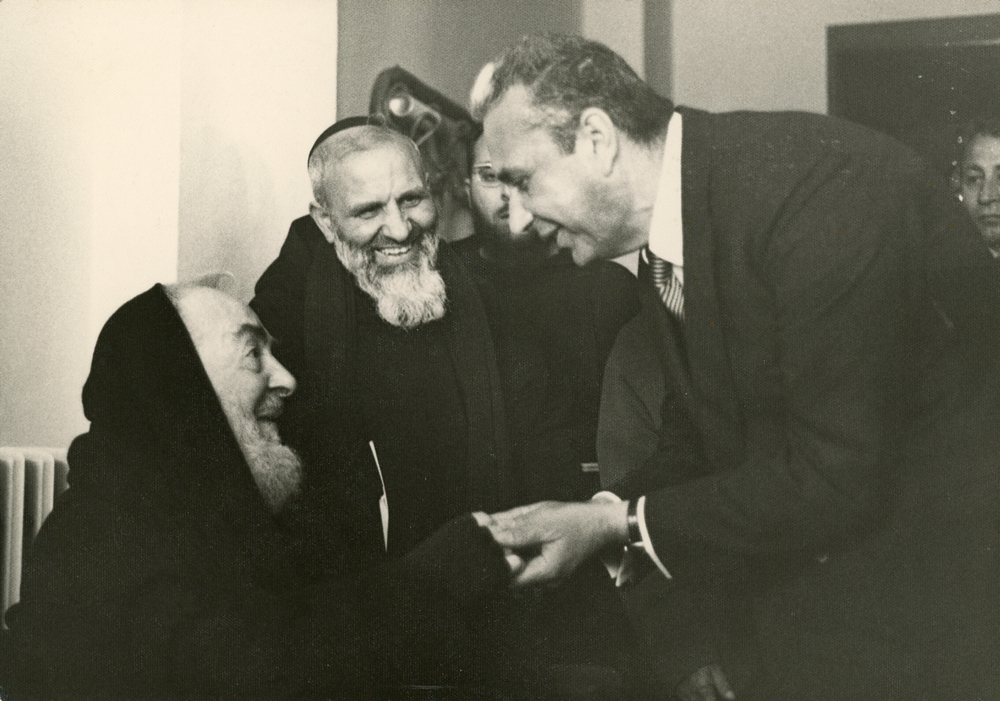
Padre Pio (left) with statesman and member of the Christian Democracy Party Aldo Moro, 1968

Following Christian Democracy's political victories in elections, Padre Pio was continually consulted by political Italian leaders including Aldo Moro, Antonio Segni, Mariano Rumor, and Giovanni Leone. He received letters requesting his prayers throughout his life, including one from King Alfonso XIII of Spain in March 1923. Padre Pio also prayed for various notable political figures, including King George V of the United Kingdom.

In 1963, following the assassination of US President John F. Kennedy, Padre Pio broke down in tears. When asked by another priest if he would pray for Kennedy's salvation, he replied, "It's not necessary. He's already in Paradise."

== Posthumous veneration ==
=== Canonisation ===
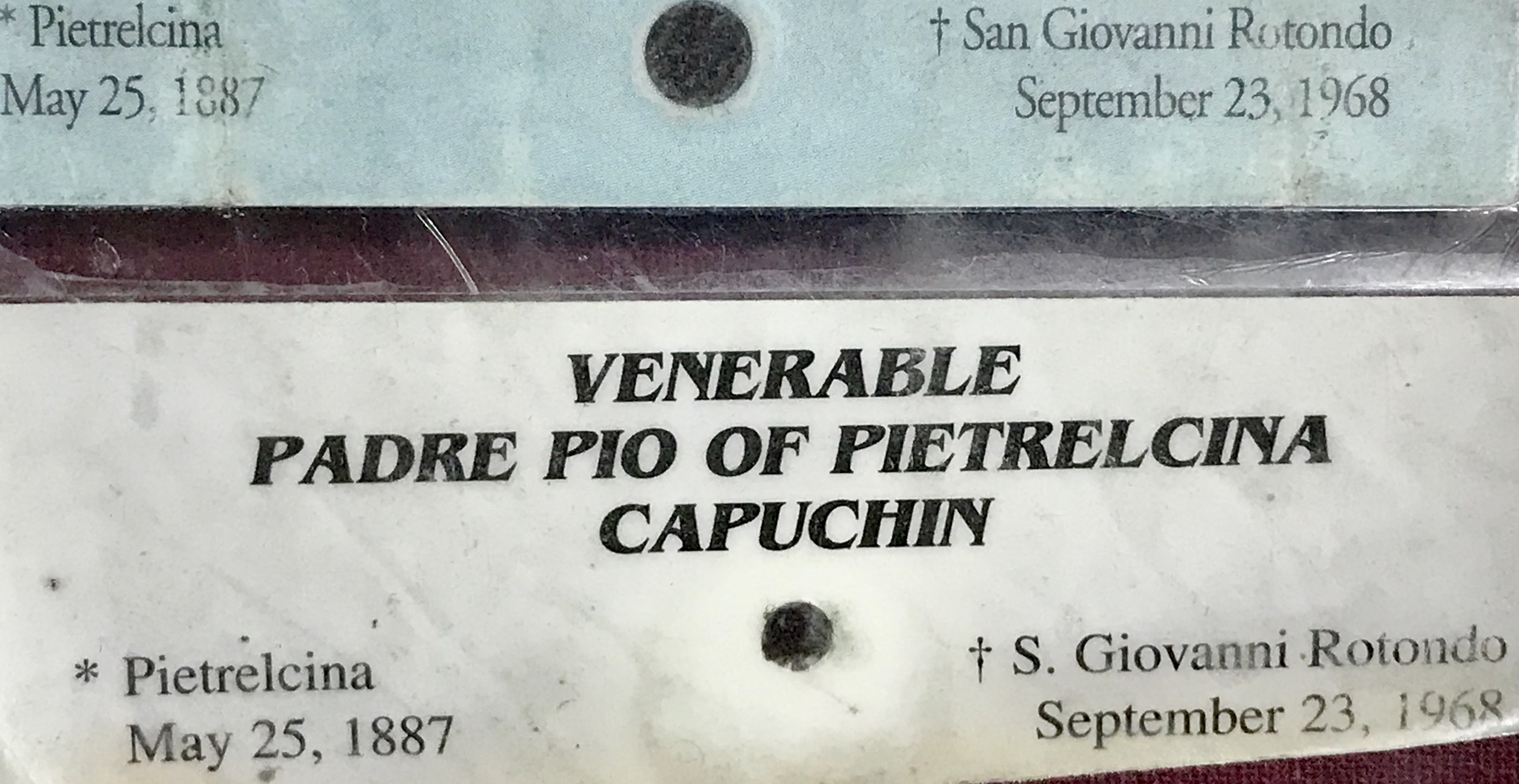
Third-class relic of Padre Padre Pio (cloth) on a prayer card included in a book about him—as was common—during the period when he had been declared "venerable" prior to his canonisation

In 1982, the Holy See authorised the archbishop of Manfredonia to open an investigation to determine whether Padre Pio should be canonised. The investigation continued for seven years, and in 1990, Padre Pio was declared a servant of God, the first step in the canonisation process.

Beginning in 1990, the Congregation for the Causes of Saints debated how Padre Pio had lived his life, and in 1997, Pope John Paul II declared him venerable, the next step in the canonisation process. A discussion of the effects of his life on others followed. Cases associated with Padre Pio's intercession were studied, such as a reported cure of an Italian woman, Consiglia de Martino.

In 1999, on the advice of the Congregation, John Paul II declared Padre Pio blessed and set 23 September as the date of his liturgical feast. He celebrated the Mass for Pio's beatification, the last step on the way toward canonisation, on 2 May 1999 at St. Peter's Square in Rome, with more than 300,000 faithful attending the ceremony. In his homily, the pope mentioned Pio's stigmata and other mystical gifts:

His body, marked by the "stigmata", showed forth the intimate bond between death and resurrection which characterizes the paschal mystery. Bl. Pio of Pietrelcina shared in the Passion with a special intensity: the unique gifts which were given to him, and the interior and mystical sufferings which accompanied them, allowed him constantly to participate in the Lord's agonies, never wavering in his sense that "Calvary is the hill of the saints."

After Pio's beatification, another case of healing attributed to his intercession was examined, that of an Italian boy named Matteo Pio Colella who recovered from a coma. After further consideration of Padre Pio's virtues and ability to do good even after his death, Pope John Paul II promulgated the decree of canonisation on 28 February 2002. The Mass for the canonisation was celebrated by John Paul II on 16 June of that year in St. Peter's Square in Rome, with an estimated 300,000 people attending the ceremony.

Padre Pio was also the first person to be declared a saint by the Palmarian Catholic Church since it began its claim to the papacy after the Second Vatican Council. Based in El Palmar de Troya, Andalusia, Spain, the Palmarian Holy See canonised Pio of Pietrelcina on 12 September 1978, in the Tenth Papal Document of the Palmarian pope Gregory XVII, the entirety of which is dedicated to this singular event.

=== Pilgrimage sites ===
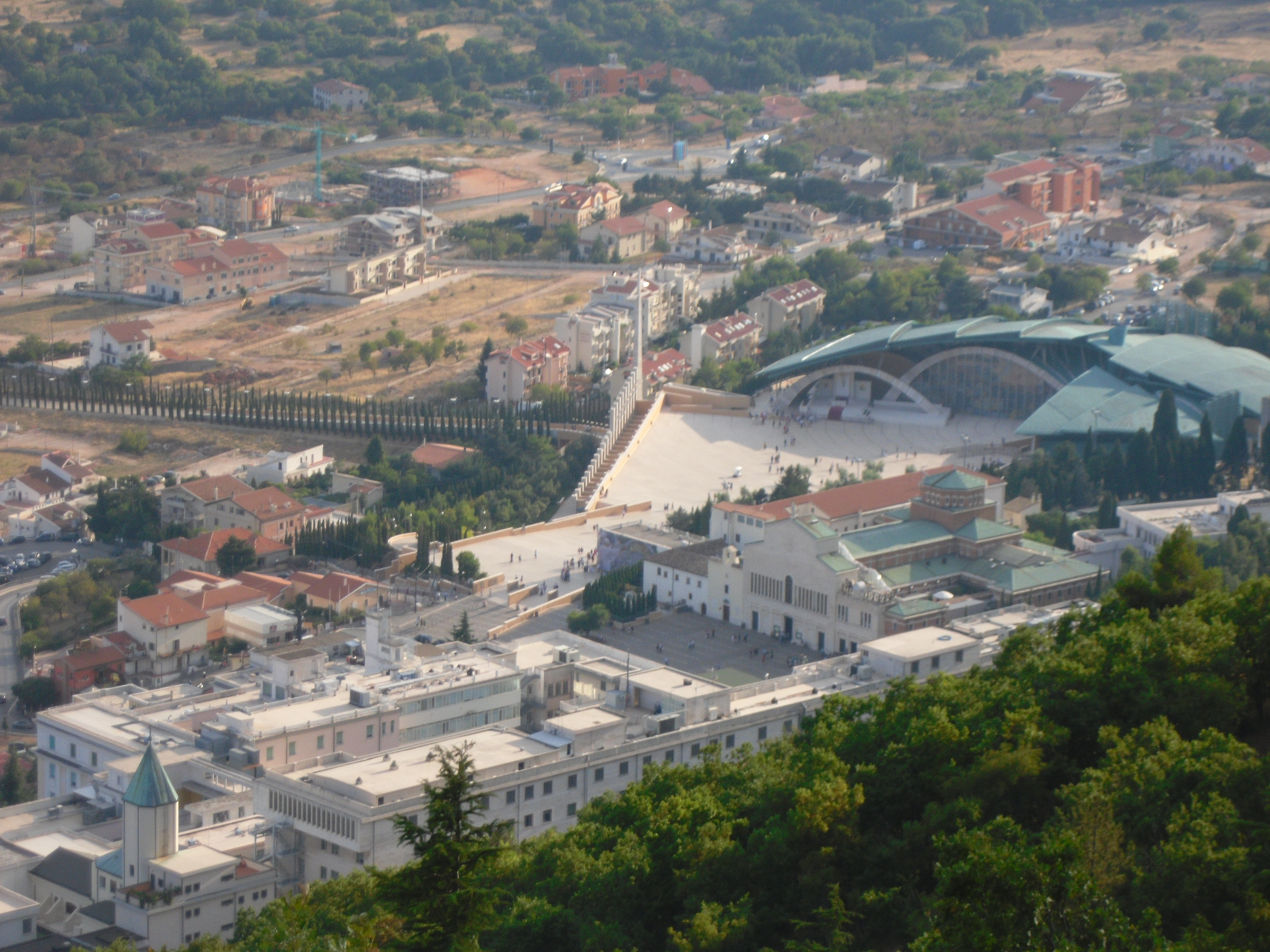
Sanctuary of Saint Pio of Pietrelcina, San Giovanni Rotondo

The town of San Giovanni Rotondo, where Padre Pio spent most of his life, is the main pilgrimage site dedicated to his memory. After his death in 1968, the Our Lady of Grace Church, the church of the Capuchin monastery where Padre Pio celebrated Mass, has become a pilgrimage site for his followers.

As the number of pilgrims kept increasing over the years, the Capuchins decided to build a new shrine near the church. Its construction began in 1991 and was completed in 2004. On 1 July of that year, Pope John Paul II dedicated the Sanctuary of Saint Pio of Pietrelcina, sometimes referred to as the Padre Pio Pilgrimage Church. The sanctuary has a capacity of around 6,000 people, and its parvise has a capacity of 30,000. Padre Pio's relics are located in the crypt of the new sanctuary, and are displayed for veneration.

The town of Pietrelcina, where Padre Pio was born and grew up, is another pilgrimage site which has become popular among his devotees. The sites that can be visited by pilgrims in Pietrelcina include his family house, where he was born; Santa Anna Church, where he was baptised; the Our Lady of the Angels Church, where he was ordained a deacon prior to becoming a priest; the room in an ancient tower in which he stayed as a friar when he was ill; and the Capuchin Santa Famiglia (Holy Family) Church. It is estimated that around 2 million pilgrims come to Pietrelcina every year.

Sanctuaries and places dedicated to Padre Pio's veneration outside Italy include the Padre Pio Shrine in Santo Tomas, Batangas, in the Philippines, and the National Center for Padre Pio in Barto, Pennsylvania, in the US.

=== Veneration by popes ===
Various popes have encouraged popular devotion to Padre Pio in various ways, notably by visiting the places associated with his life and ministry. San Giovanni Rotondo, where Padre Pio spent most of his life and where his shrine is located, was visited by Pope John Paul II, Pope Benedict XVI and Pope Francis.

John Paul II, even before becoming pope, had much admiration for Padre Pio when he was still alive. As Karol Wojtyła, a young priest studying in Rome, he made a pilgrimage to San Giovanni Rotondo to meet him in person in 1947, returning there as a cardinal in 1974 and once again as pope in May 1987 to celebrate the hundredth anniversary of Padre Pio's birth.

Benedict XVI visited San Giovanni Rotondo on a pastoral visit on 21 June 2009. He visited the Church of Our Lady of the Angels to venerate Padre Pio's relics in the crypt, celebrated Mass, and met with various people, including both the sick and the employees of the Home for the Relief of Suffering.

Francis also supported popular devotion to Padre Pio. During the Extraordinary Jubilee of Mercy (8 December 2015 – 20 November 2016) he requested that Padre Pio's relics be exposed for veneration in St. Peter's Basilica from 8 to 14 February 2016; and he specifically honoured him as a "saint-confessor" to inspire people to resort to the sacrament of Penance during the Jubilee. On 17 March 2018, Francis visited both Pietrelcina and San Giovanni Rotondo to celebrate the fiftieth anniversary of Padre Pio's death.

=== Exhumation ===
On 3 March 2008, Padre Pio's body was exhumed from his crypt 40 years after his death so that his remains could be prepared for display. A church statement described the body as being in "fair condition". Archbishop Domenico Umberto D'Ambrosio, Papal Legate to the shrine in San Giovanni Rotondo, stated: "[T]he top part of the skull is partly skeletal but the chin is perfect and the rest of the body is well preserved". D'Ambrosio also confirmed in a communiqué that the stigmata were not visible. He said that Padre Pio's hands "looked like they had just undergone a manicure". It was hoped that morticians would be able to restore the face so that it would be recognisable; but because of its deterioration, his face was covered with a lifelike silicone mask, made from a 1968 photograph of his body by the London-based Gems Studio, which usually worked for wax museums and ethnological museums.

Cardinal José Saraiva Martins, Prefect for the Congregation for the Causes of the Saints, celebrated Mass for 15,000 devotees on 24 April 2008, at the church of Our Lady of Grace in San Giovanni Rotondo, before the body went on display in a crystal, marble, and silver sepulchre in the crypt of the monastery. Padre Pio is wearing his brown Capuchin habit with a white silk stole embroidered with crystals and gold thread. His hands hold a large wooden cross. Eight hundred thousand pilgrims worldwide, mostly from Italy, made reservations to view the body up to December 2008, but only 7,200 people a day were able to file past the crystal coffin. Officials extended the display through September 2009.

Padre Pio's remains were placed in the Sanctuary of Saint Pio and in April 2010 moved to a special golden crypt.

=== Prayer groups ===
Padre Pio's prayer groups began in the 1950s, when Pope Pius XII made a general request to form groups gathering monthly to pray together. The friar responded to this call and encouraged his devotees to form such groups. These groups were associated with the construction of the Casa Sollievo della Sofferenza. A biweekly bulletin named after the hospital and published from 1949 helped the groups develop.

In 1951, the first statutes of Padre Pio's prayer groups were codified. They gathered monthly, with the agreement of the local bishop and under the guidance of a priest, to pray for the pope and for Padre Pio's ministries. New statutes were formally approved by the Vatican in 1986. The prayer groups are coordinated from their headquarters at the hospital.

The prayer groups kept growing during Padre Pio's lifetime, and especially after his death and subsequent canonization. In 1968, at the time of his death, there were around 700 groups, with 68,000 members in 15 countries. In 2013, there were approximately 3,300 registered groups in 60 countries, counting in total about three million members, with about 75% of the groups based in Italy, and the remaining based outside of it, mainly in France, Ireland, and the United States.

=== Worldwide devotion ===
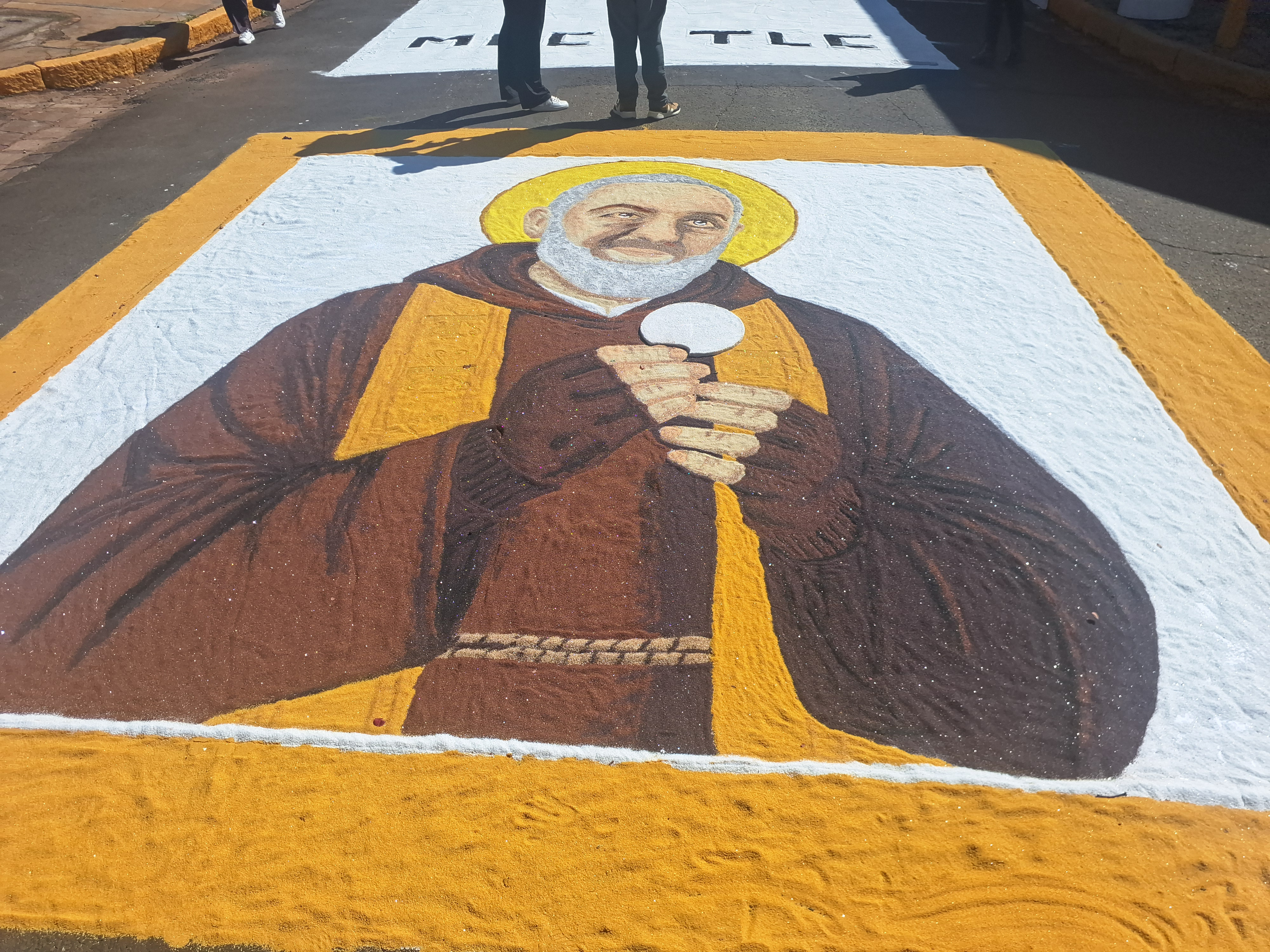
A tribute depicted in a Corpus Christi carpet in São Manuel, Brazil, in 2026

Padre Pio has become one of the world's most popular saints. The world's first St. Padre Pio parish was established on 16 June 2002 in Kleinburg, Ontario, Canada. There are now other parishes in the towns of Vineland and Lavallette, New Jersey, in the US and in Sydney, Australia. There are also shrines to Padre Pio in Buena, New Jersey, and Santo Tomas, Batangas, Philippines. A 2006 survey by the Italian magazine Famiglia Cristiana (Christian Family) found that more Italian Catholics pray for intercession to Padre Pio than to anyone else.

A few months after his canonisation in 2002, a new TV station, Padre Pio TV, was launched in Italy dedicated to his life and devotion. Based in San Giovanni Rotondo, it broadcasts on its own website and various Internet platforms.

Pio's remains were brought to the Vatican for veneration during the Extraordinary Jubilee of Mercy, 2015–2016. Saints Padre Pio and Leopold Mandic were designated as saint-confessors to inspire people to become reconciled to the Church and to God by confession of their sins.

Saint Pio of Pietrelcina was named the patron saint of civil defence volunteers after a group of 160 petitioned the Italian Bishops' Conference for this designation and the bishops forwarded the request to the Vatican, which gave its approval. Padre Pio is also "less officially" known as the patron saint of stress relief and the "January blues", after the Catholic Enquiry Office in London proclaimed him as such. They also designated the most depressing day of the year, identified as the Monday closest to January 22, as "Don't Worry Be Happy Day", in honour of Padre Pio's famous advice: "Pray, hope, and don't worry."

Some of Padre Pio's relics toured Northern Ireland in 2022 and Scotland in 2023.

=== Iconography ===
Padre Pio's iconography has been widely reproduced on devotional items and statues throughout Italy and the world, even before his beatification and canonisation. In Italy his portrait can be found in many churches, as well as in private homes and public places such as shops and restaurants. In religious art, he is usually depicted in his brown Capuchin habit with gloves covering his stigmata.

Statues of Padre Pio have been erected in Italy and in other countries, including the US, the Philippines, and Malta. A statue of him in Messina, Sicily, attracted attention in 2002 when it supposedly wept tears of blood. In Italy, near the coast of Capraia Island in the Mediterranean Sea, an underwater statue of Padre Pio was submerged 40 feet (12 m) deep in 1998. In the St. Padre Pio Shrine in Landisville, New Jersey, there is a statue of Padre Pio built in and imported from Italy.

In 2021, construction of a new sanctuary dedicated to Padre Pio started on a hill overlooking Cebu City in the Philippines, with a 100-foot-tall statue of the saint, and in the same year, a statue of him was inaugurated in the Padre Pio Shrine in Santo Tomas, Batangas.

Sculptures of Padre Pio in Italy

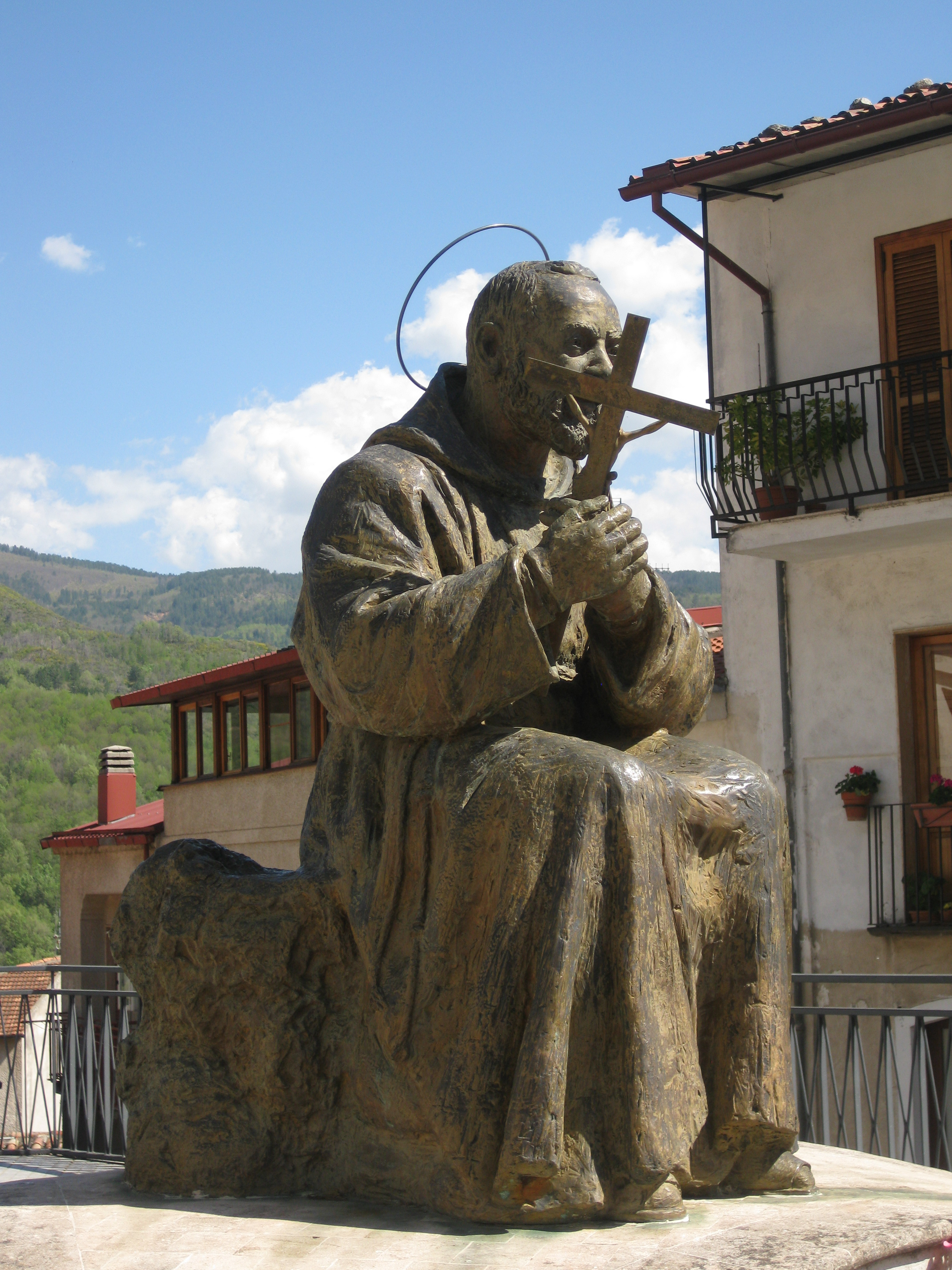
Sculpture of Padre Pio, Serra Pedace, Calabria, Italy

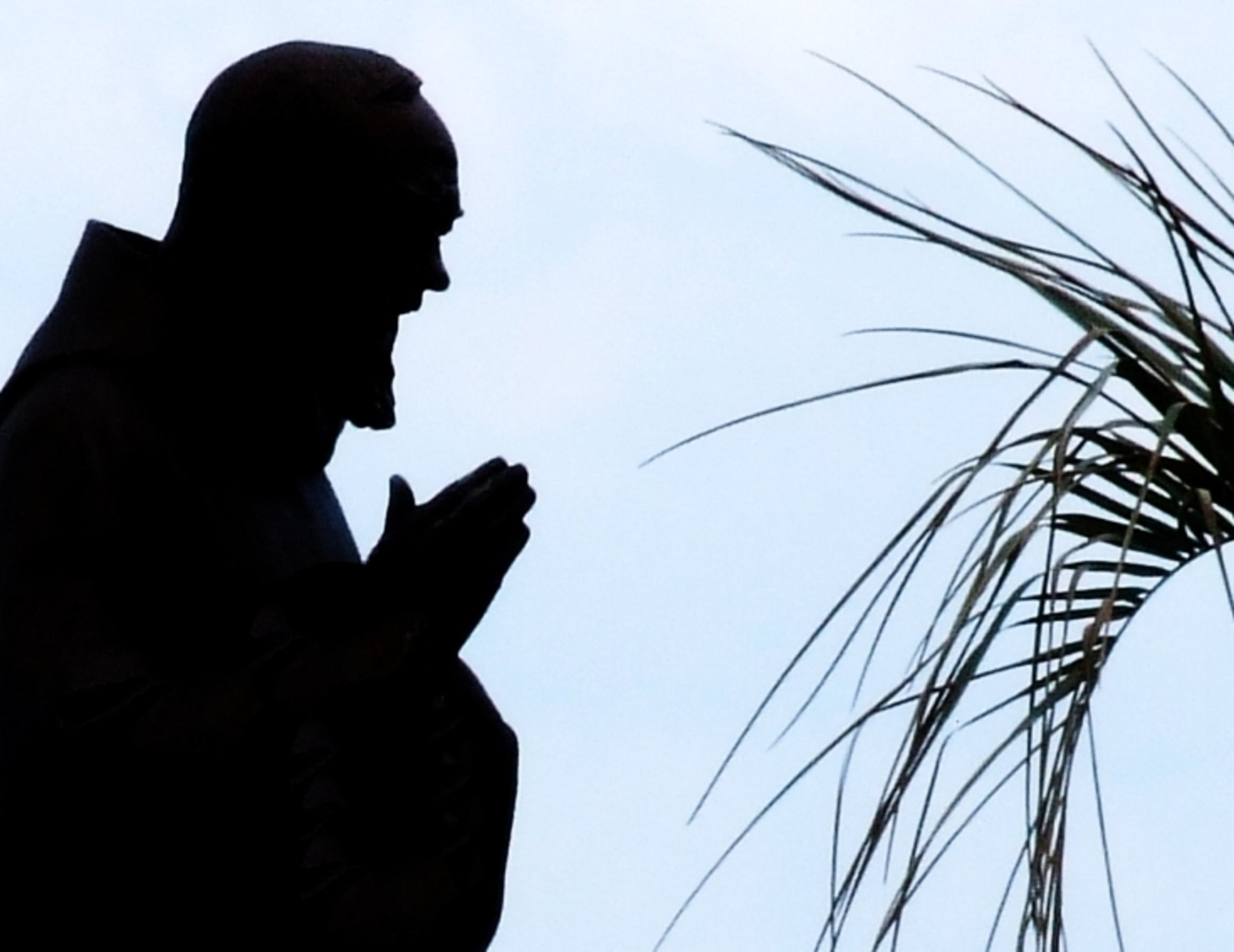
Sculpture of Padre Pio, Taormina, Sicily, Italy

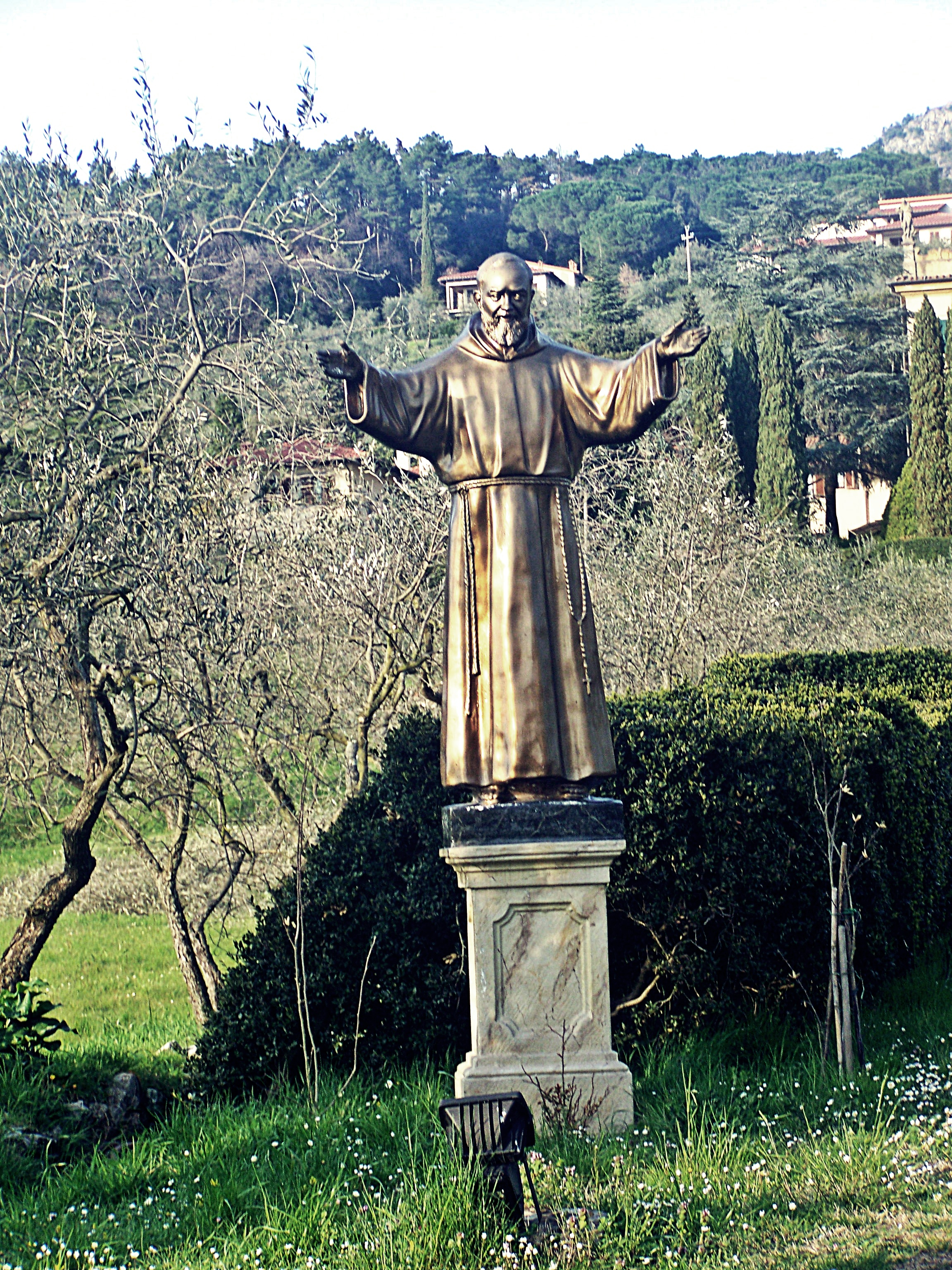
Sculpture of Padre Pio, Prato, Tuscany, Italy

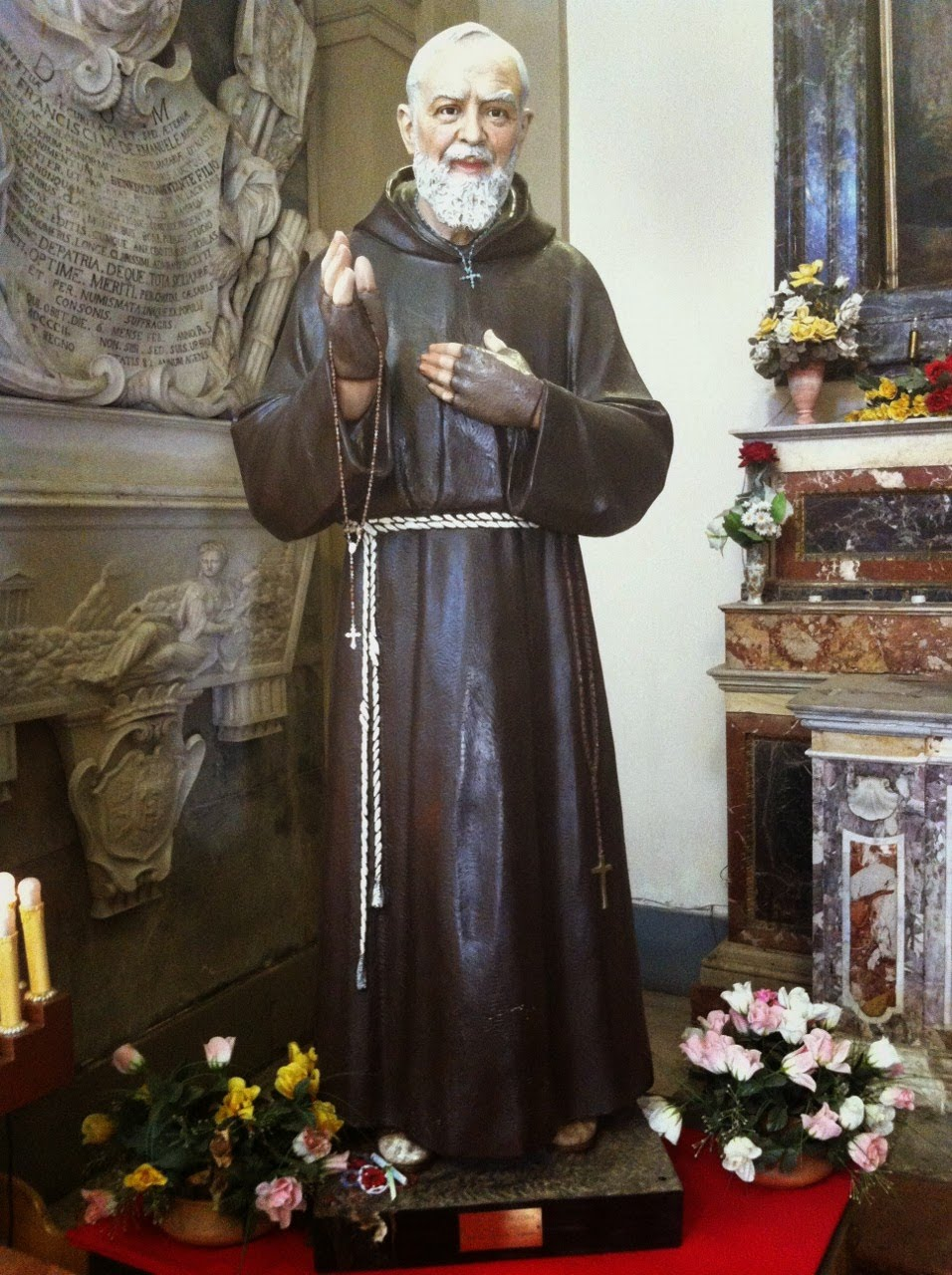
Statue of Padre Pio near the Colonna dell'Immacolata (Column of the Immaculate), Palermo, Sicily, Italy

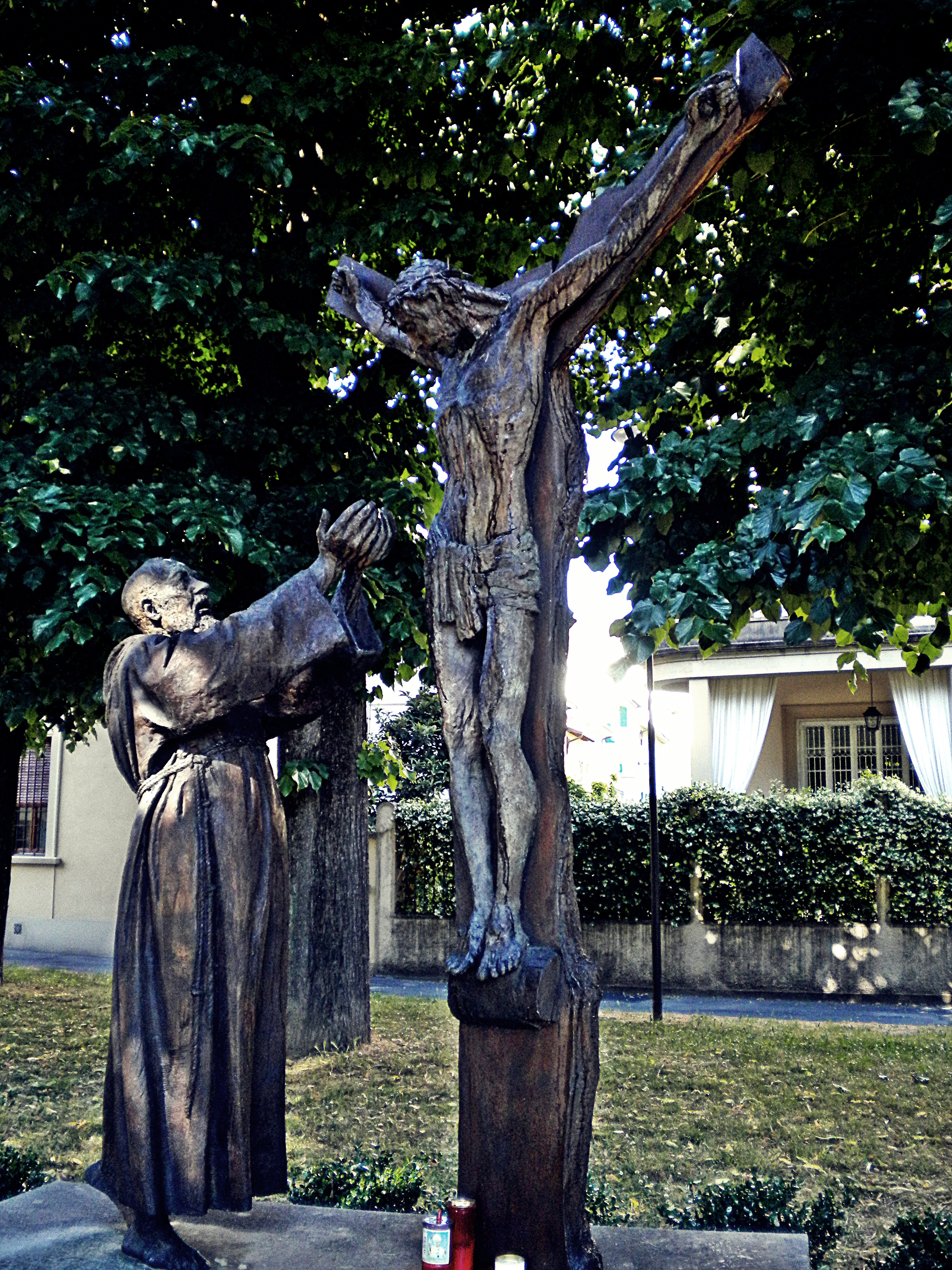
Sculpture of Padre Pio reaching up towards Jesus on the cross, Prato, Tuscany, Italy

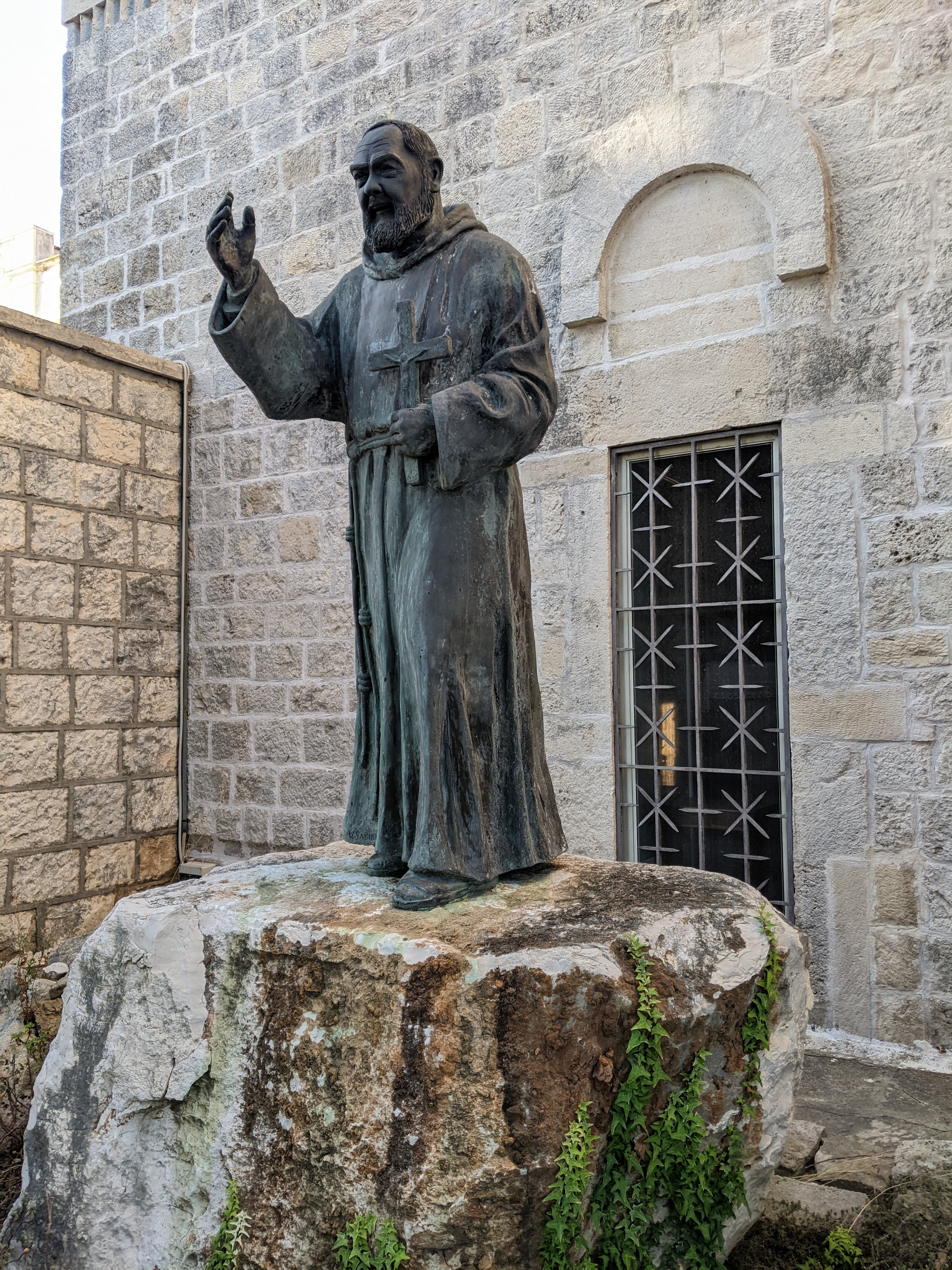
Statue of Padre Pio at the Chiesa del Crocifisso (Church of the Crucifx), Giovinazzo, Apulia, Italy

== See also ==
- Padre Pio (2022 film)
- Padre Pio: Between Heaven and Earth
- Padre Pio: Miracle Man
- Padre Pio TV
- Sanctuary of Saint Pio of Pietrelcina
- Victim soul
- Visions of Jesus and Mary
